= Rijeka =

City in Primorje-Gorski Kotar County, Croatia

Rijeka: Reka / Rika (Chakavian); Fiume (Italian)
- City
- Grad Rijeka; City of Rijeka
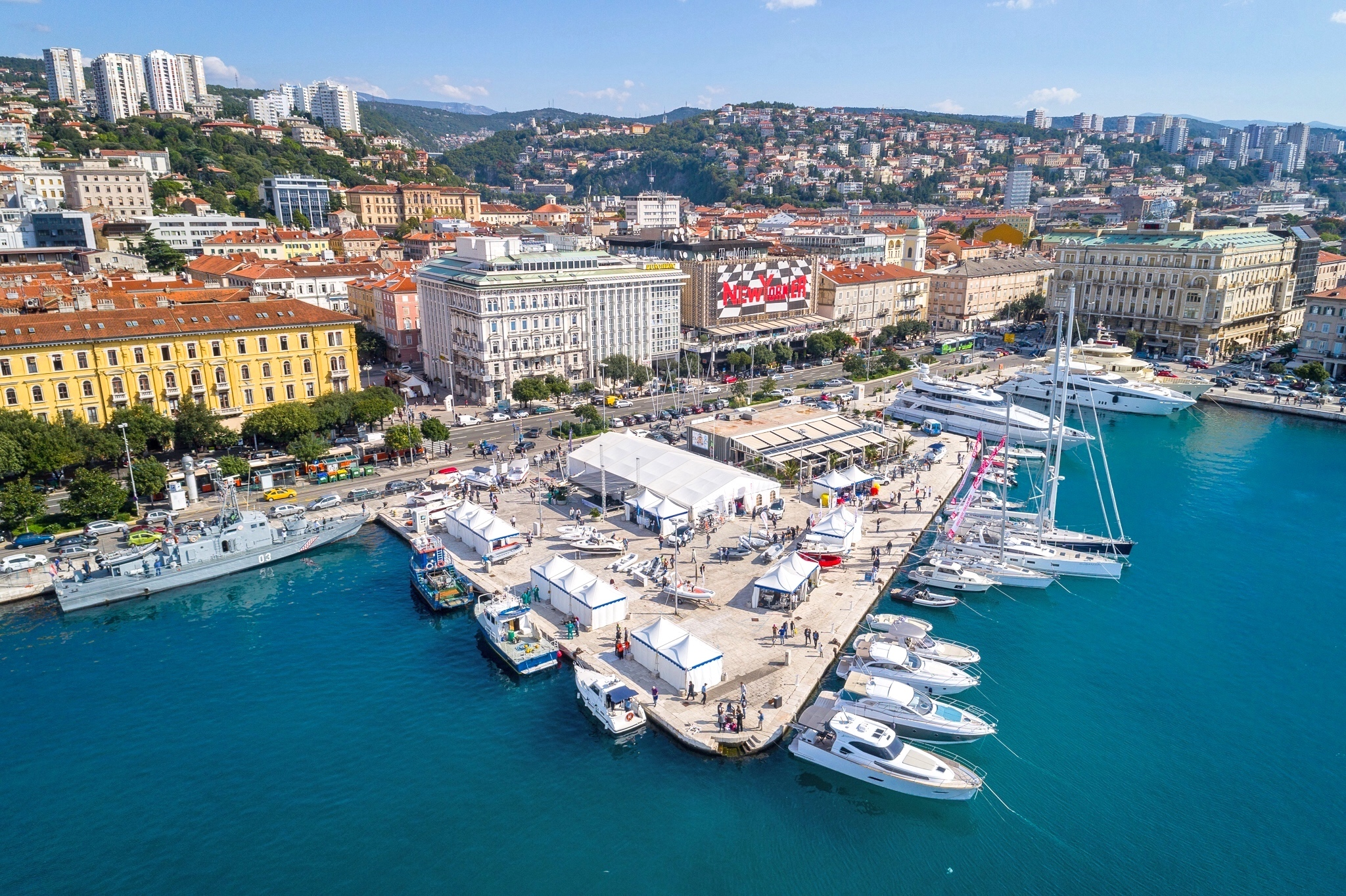
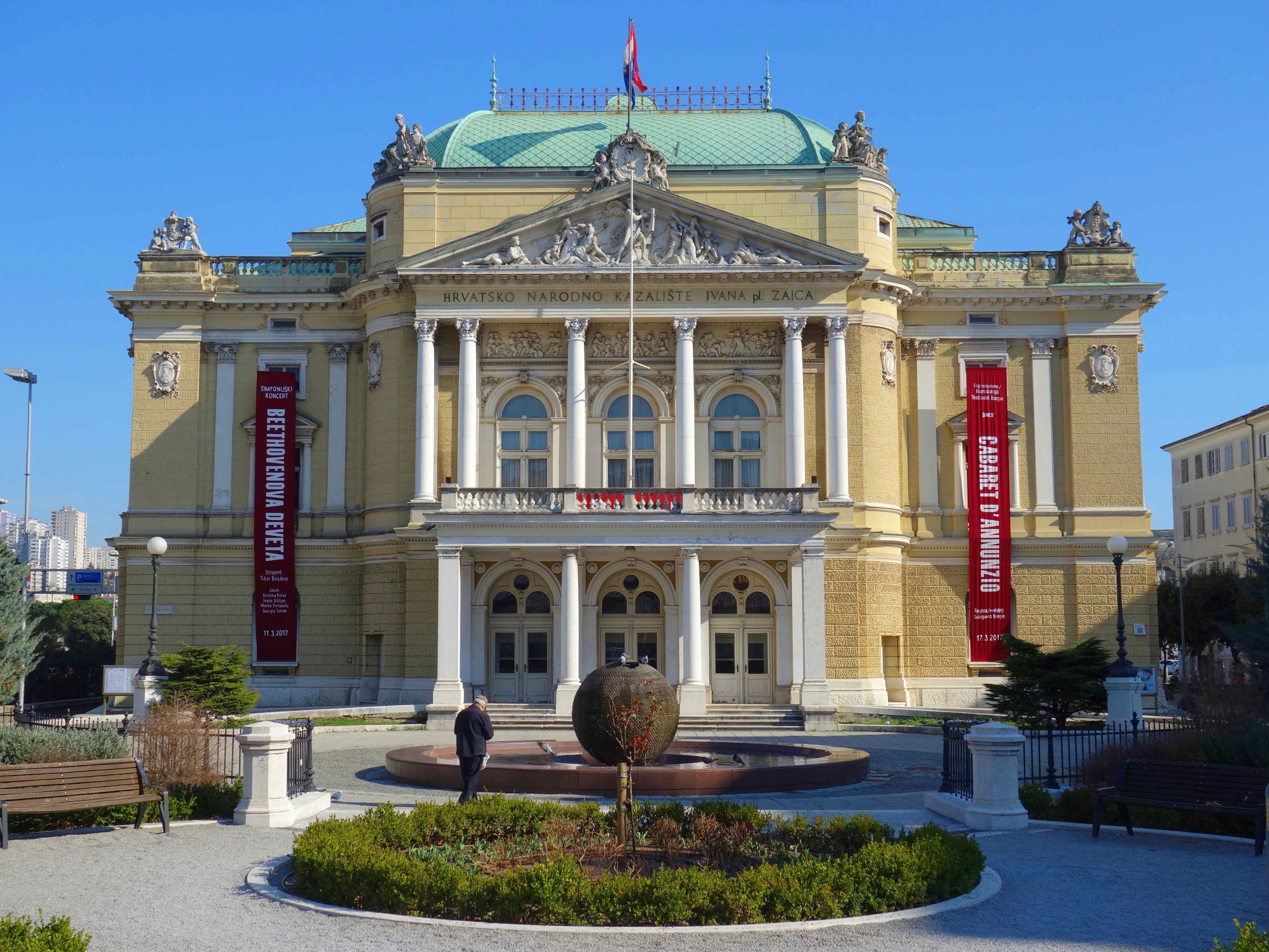
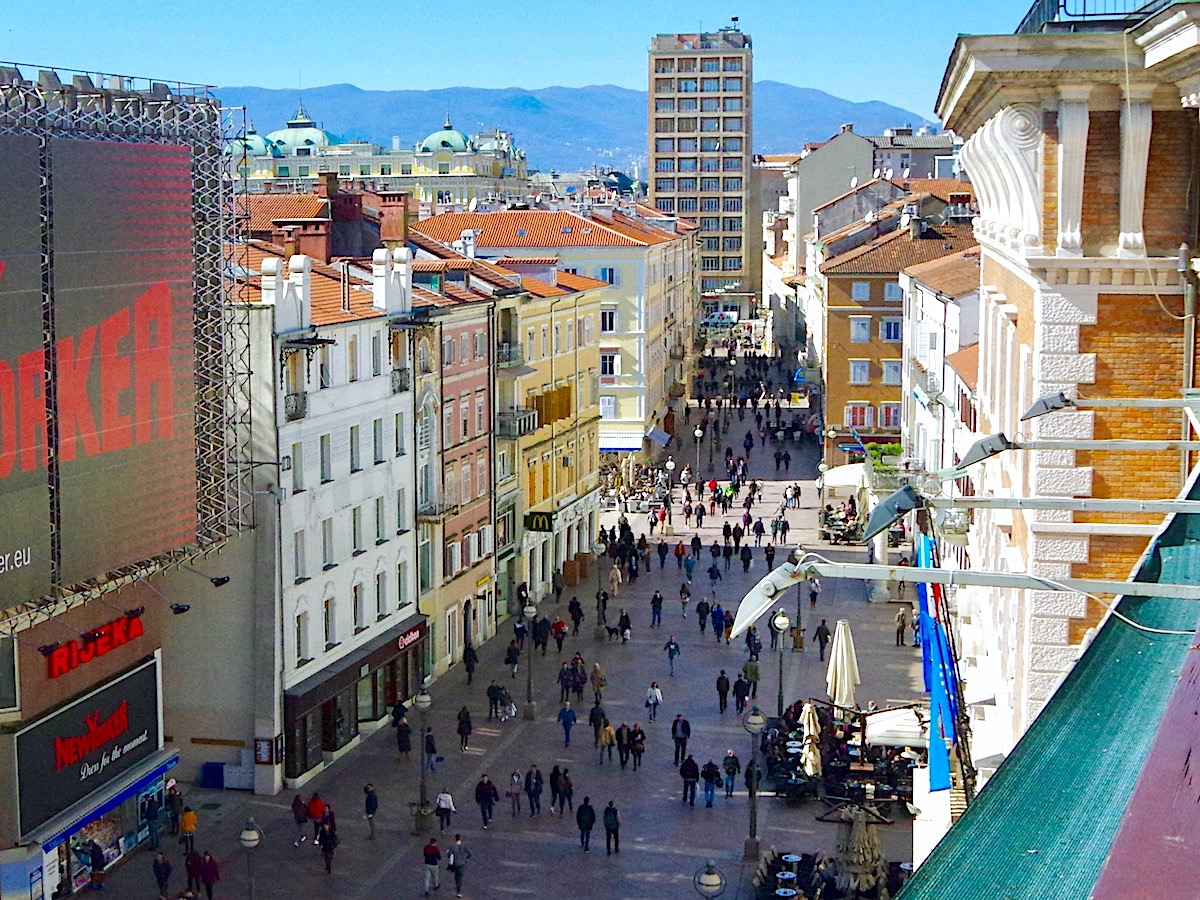
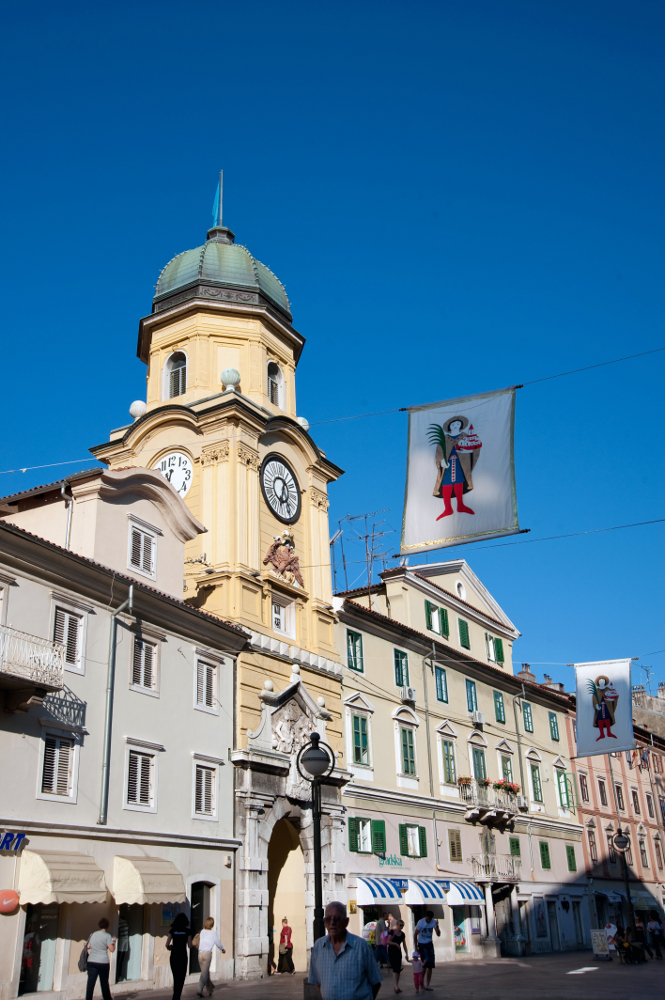
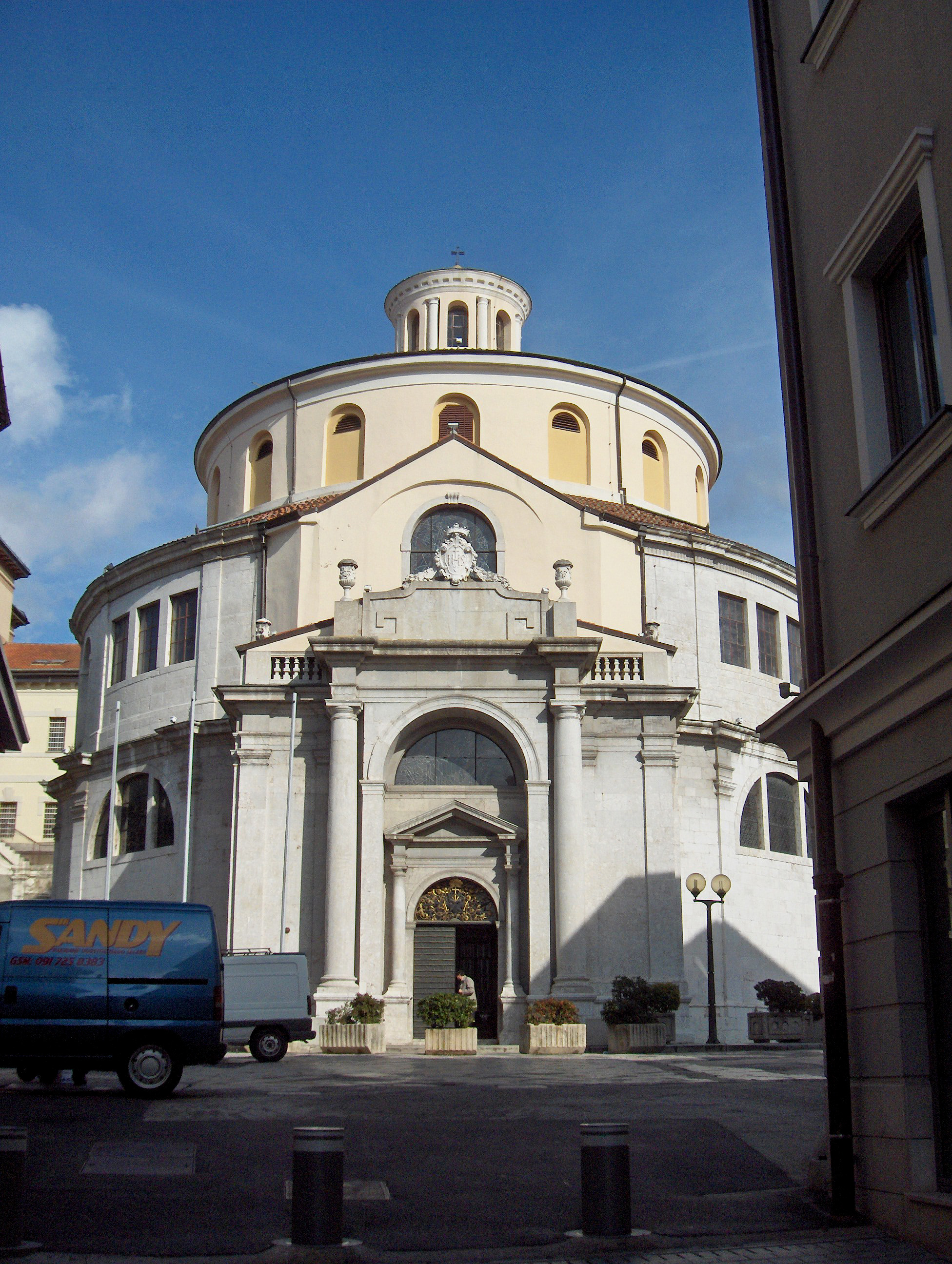
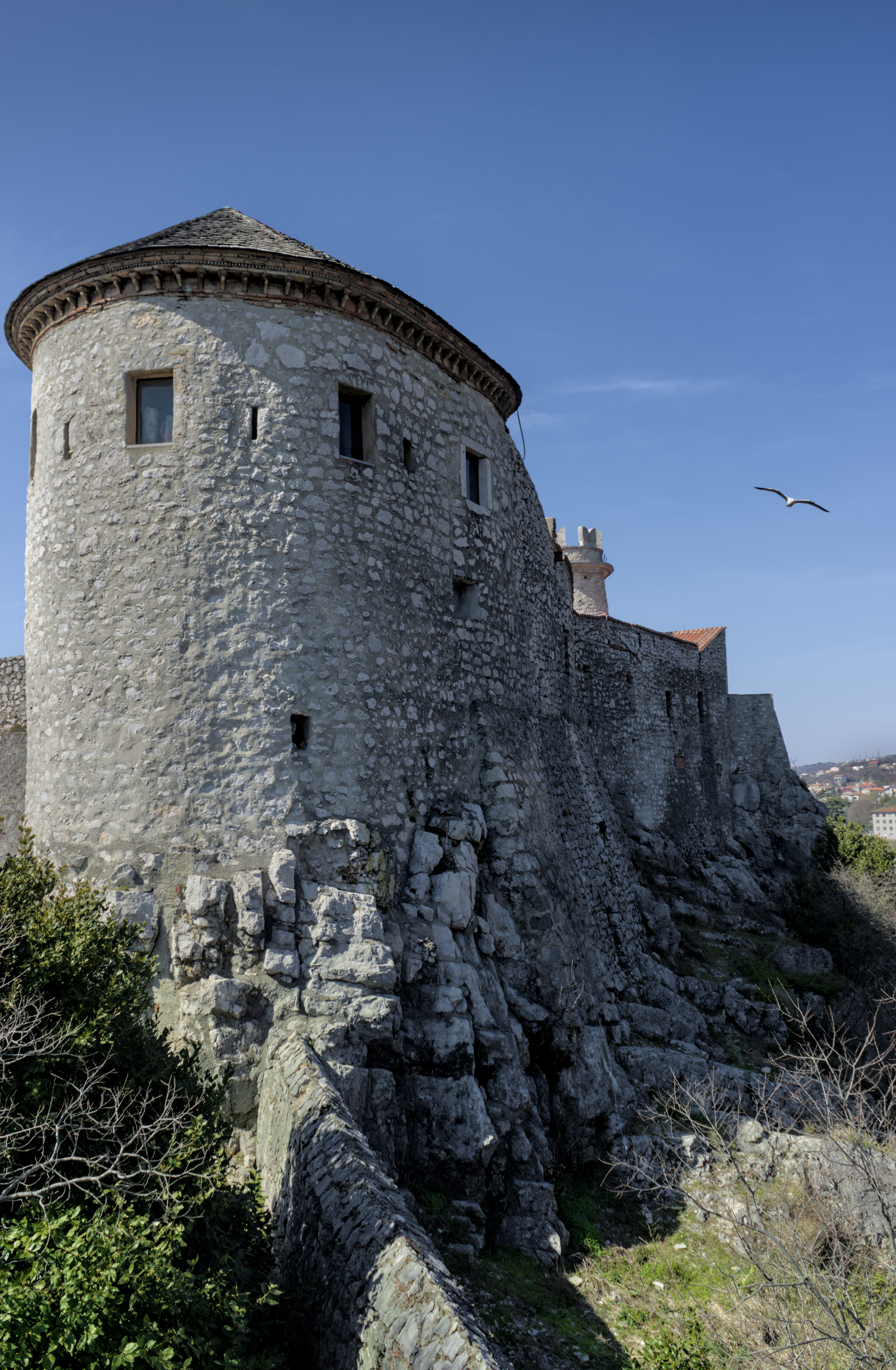
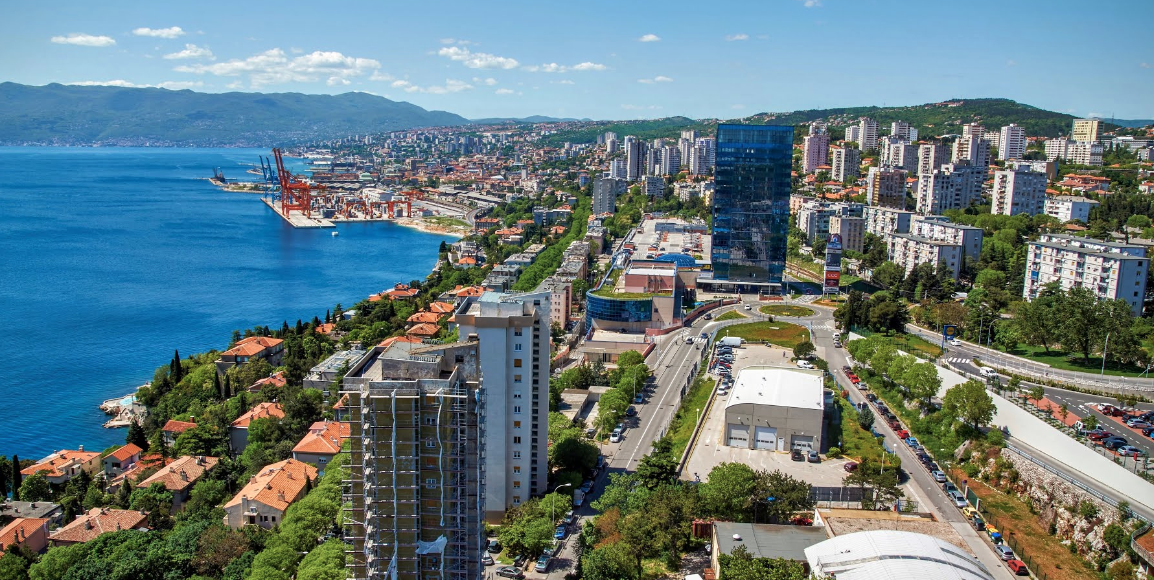
- Riva Waterfront National Theatre Zajc Korzo City Tower Rijeka Cathedral Trsat Castle Kvarner Gulf and Učka mountain

- Flag Coat of arms
- Interactive map of Rijeka
- Location of Rijeka within Croatia
- Coordinates: 45°19′38″N 14°26′28″E
- Country: Croatia
- Region: Central Croatia (Croatian Littoral)
- County: Primorje-Gorski Kotar County

Government
  - Mayor: Iva Rinčić (Ind.)
  - City Council: 31 members: AM, UNIJA, Centre, HSU, Focus, A101 (11); HDZ (5); PGS, IDS, RI (4); Independents (4); SDP (3); Možemo! (3); Most (1)
  - Electoral district: VIII

Area
  - City: 43.4 km^{2} (16.8 sq mi)
  - Metro: 3,200 km^{2} (1,200 sq mi)
- Elevation: 0–499 m (0–1,637 ft)

Population (2021)
  - City: 107,964
  - Density: 2,490/km^{2} (6,440/sq mi)
  - Metro: 219,325
- Time zone: UTC+1 (CET)
  - Summer (DST): UTC+2 (CEST)
- Postal code: 51000
- Area code: 051
- Vehicle registration: RI
- Patron saints: St. Vitus
- Website: www.rijeka.hr

Rijeka (Note: English: /riˈɛkə, riˈeɪkə/ ree-EK-ə, ree-AY-kə, US also /riˈjɛkə/ ree-YEK-ə; Croatian: [rijěːka], local Chakavian: Reka or Rika; Fiuman Venetian and Italian: Fiume [ˈfjuːme].) (lit. River) is the principal seaport and the third-largest city in Croatia. It is located in Primorje-Gorski Kotar County on Kvarner Bay, an inlet of the Adriatic Sea and in 2021 had a population of 107,964 inhabitants. Historically, because of its strategic position and its excellent deep-water port, the city was fiercely contested, especially between the Holy Roman Empire, the Republic of Venice, the Kingdom of Italy and Yugoslavia, changing rulers and demographics many times over centuries. According to the 2021 census data, 85% of its citizens are Croats, along with small numbers of Serbs, Bosniaks and Italians.

Rijeka is the main city and county seat of the Primorje-Gorski Kotar County. Historically shaped by various ruling powers—including the Habsburg Monarchy, Italy (while being Free State of Fiume), and Yugoslavia—Rijeka has developed a diverse cultural heritage reflected in its architecture, language, and traditions. The city is known for its major port facilities, shipbuilding industry, and vibrant cultural scene, including the internationally recognized Rijeka Carnival. The city's economy largely depends on shipbuilding (shipyards 3. Maj and Viktor Lenac Shipyard) and maritime transport (Jadrolinija). The city is home to the University of Rijeka and several important cultural institutions, including theaters, museums, and galleries. Its architectural landscape reflects a mix of Austro-Hungarian, Italian, and modern influences, with notable landmarks such as Trsat Castle, Rijeka Cathedral, Ivan Zajc Croatian National Theatre, Palace Modello, City Clock Tower, Trsat, Petar Kružić staircase and many others.

In 2016, Rijeka was selected as the European Capital of Culture for 2020, alongside Galway, Ireland, and Rijeka is known for other manifestations and sporting events such as: Kvarnerska Rivijera, Rijeka Open, Yugoslavian motorcycle Grand Prix, EuroBasket 1975, 2000 European Men's Handball Championship, 2003 World Women's Handball Championship, 2008 European Short Course Swimming Championships, 2016 European Universities Games and 2018 LEN Men's Europa Cup.

== Name ==
Historically, Rijeka was called Tharsatica, Vitopolis (lit. 'City of [Saint] Vitus'), or Flumen (lit. 'River') in Latin. The city is called Rijeka in Croatian, Reka in Slovene, and Reka or Rika in the local dialects of Chakavian. It is called Fiume in Italian, Fiuman Venetian, and Hungarian (meaning 'river' in the former two). Meanwhile, in German the city has been called Sankt Veit am Flaum/Pflaum (lit. 'St. Vitus on the Flaum/Pflaum', with the name of the river being derived from Latin flumen).

Today, the name Fiume is not used for official purposes for legal reasons. Beginning in 2018 there was an attempt on the initiative of the city's Italian community to install a number of signs, including a route confirmation sign, featuring both names on the west entrance to the city among other places, but as of 2021 no such signs have been installed due to technical difficulties.

== Geography ==
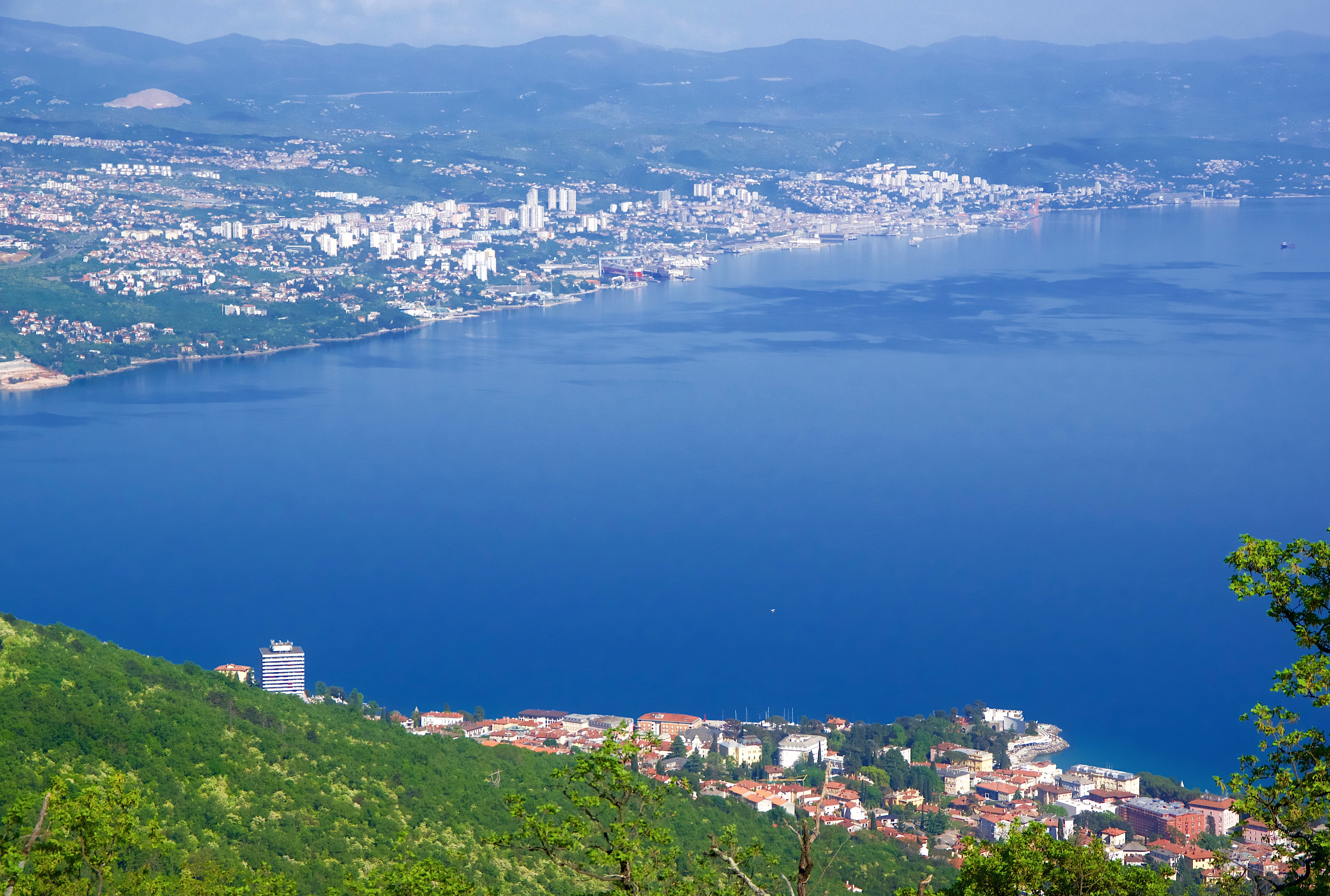
Rijeka Bay

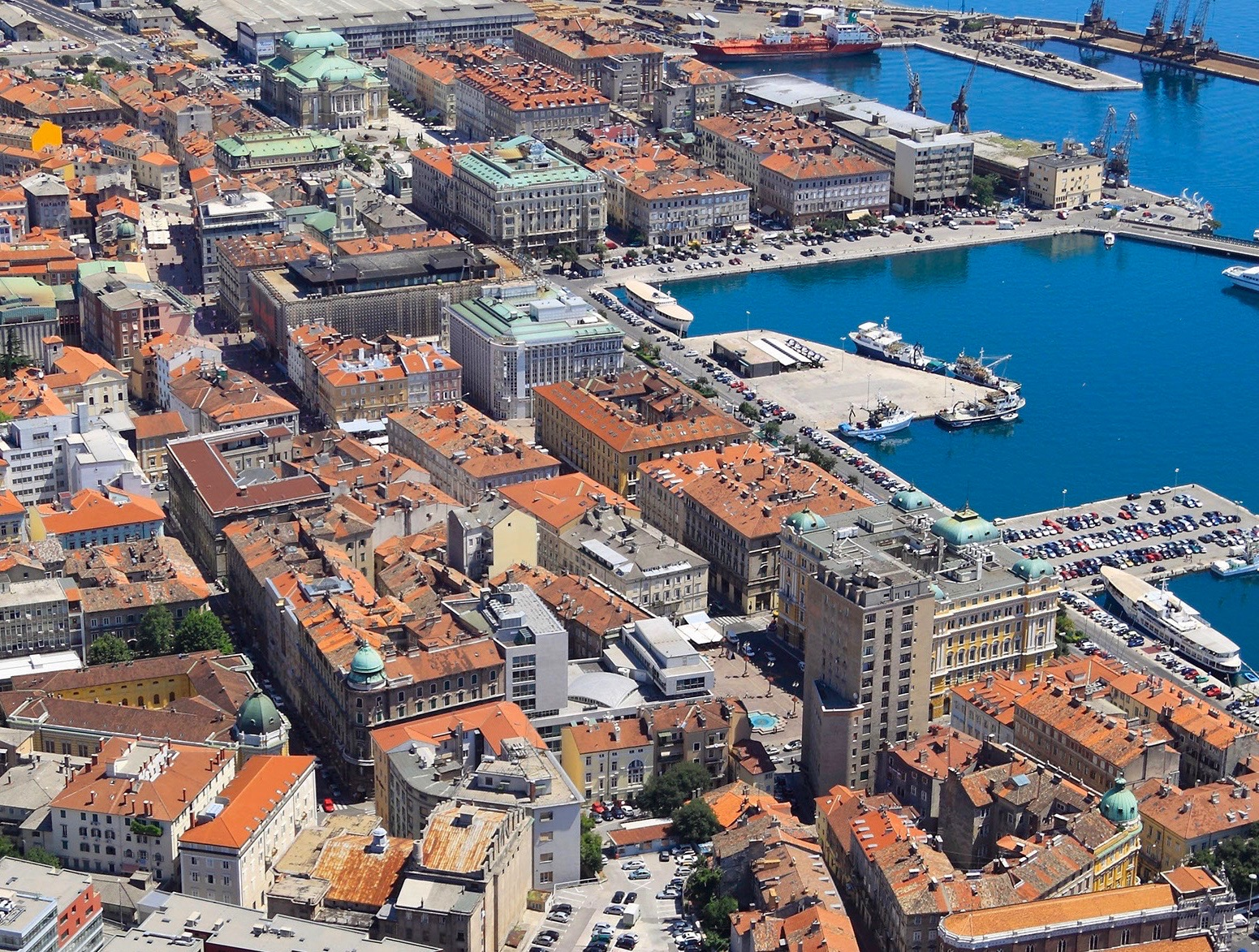
Aerial view of central Rijeka

Rijeka is located in western Croatia, 131 kilometres (81 miles) south-west of the capital, Zagreb, on the coast of Kvarner Gulf, in the northern part of the Adriatic Sea. Geographically, Rijeka is roughly equidistant from Milan (485 km [301 mi]), Budapest (502 km [312 mi]), Munich (516 km [321 mi]), Vienna (516 km [321 mi]) and Belgrade (550 km [340 mi]). Other major regional centers such as Trieste (76 km [47 mi]), Venice (240 km [150 mi]) and Ljubljana (115 km [71 mi]) are all relatively close and easily accessible. The Bay of Rijeka, which is bordered by Vela Vrata (between Istria and the island of Cres), Srednja Vrata (between Cres and Krk Island) and Mala Vrata (between Krk and the mainland) is connected to the Kvarner Gulf and is deep enough (about fifty metres or 160 feet) to accommodate large commercial ships.

The City of Rijeka lies at the mouth of the river Rječina and in the Vinodol micro-region of the Croatian coast. From three sides Rijeka is surrounded by mountains. To the west, the 1,396-metre (4,580 ft) Učka range is prominent. To the north/north-east are the Snežnik plateau and the 1,528 m (5,013 ft) Risnjak massif with its national park. To the east/south-east is the 1,533-metre (5,030 ft) Velika Kapela range. This type of terrain configuration prevented Rijeka from developing further inland (to the north) and the city mostly lies on a long and relatively narrow strip along the coast. Two important inland transport routes start in Rijeka. The first route runs north-east to the Pannonian Basin. This route takes advantage of Rijeka's location close to the point where the Dinaric Alps are the narrowest (about fifty kilometres or 31 miles) and easiest to traverse, making it the optimal route from the Hungarian plain to the sea. It also makes Rijeka the natural harbour for the Pannonian Basin (especially Hungary). The other route runs north-west across the Postojna Gate connecting Rijeka with Slovenia and further through the Ljubljana Gap with Austria and beyond. A third more coastal route runs east-west connecting Rijeka (and, by extension, the Adriatic coastal cities to the south) with Trieste and northern Italy.

== History ==
Timeline of Rijeka
Historical affiliations

Kingdom of Croatia-Kingdom of Hungary: 1102–1466
Holy Roman Empire (Habsburg monarchy), 1466–1809
First French Empire, 1809–1814
Austrian Empire, 1814–1867
Austria-Hungary ( Transleithania), 1867–1918
State of Slovenes, Croats and Serbs, 1918
Kingdom of Serbs, Croats and Slovenes, 1918–1919
Italian Regency of Carnaro, 1919–1920
Free State of Fiume, 1920–1924
Kingdom of Italy, 1924–1943
OZAK, 1943–1945
Yugoslavia (SR Croatia), 1945–1991
Croatia, 1991–present

=== Neolithic through late antiquity ===
Though traces of Neolithic settlements can be found in the region, the earliest modern settlements on the site were Celtic Tharsatica (modern Trsat, now part of Rijeka) on the hill, and the tribe of mariners, the Liburni, in the natural harbour below. The city long retained its dual character. Rijeka was first mentioned in the 1st century AD by Pliny the Elder as Tarsatica in his Natural History (iii.140). Rijeka (Tarsatica) is again mentioned around AD 150 by the Greek geographer and astronomer Ptolemy in his Geography when describing the "Location of Illyria or Liburnia, and of Dalmatia" (Fifth Map of Europe).

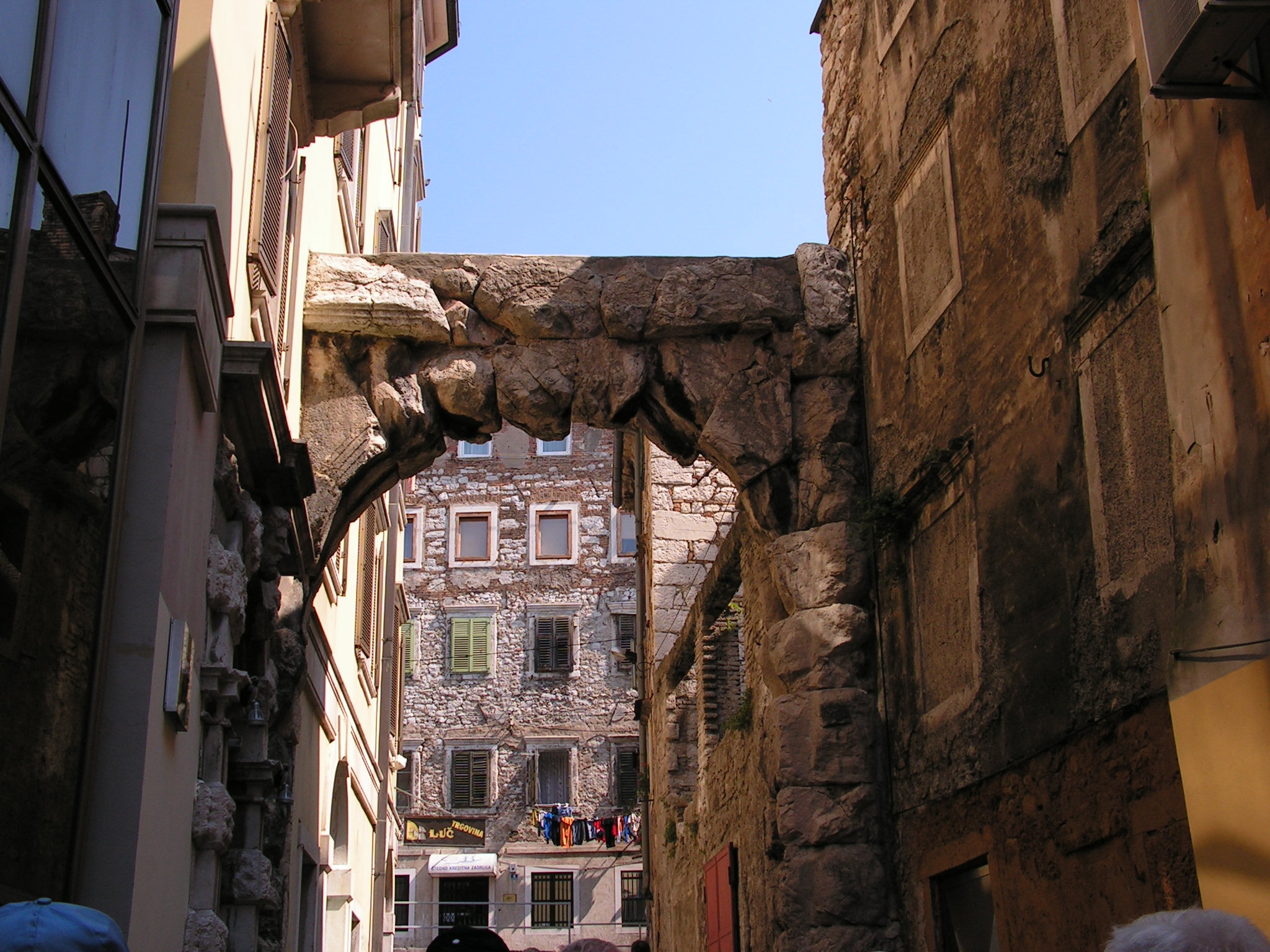
The Roman arch (Rimski luk), the oldest architectural monument in Rijeka and an entrance to the old town

In the time of Augustus, the Romans rebuilt Tarsatica as a municipium Flumen (MacMullen 2000), situated on the right bank of the small river Rječina (whose name means "the big river"). It became a city within the Roman Province of Dalmatia until the 6th century. In this period the city was part of the Liburnia limes (system of walls and fortifications against raiding Barbarians). Remains of these walls are still visible in some places today.

After the 4th century Rijeka was rededicated to Saint Vitus, the city's patron saint, as Terra Fluminis sancti Sancti Viti or in German Sankt Veit am Pflaum. From the 5th century onwards, the town was ruled successively by the Ostrogoths, the Byzantines, the Lombards, and the Avars. The city was burned down in 452 by the troops of Attila the Hun as part of their Aquileia campaign.

=== Middle Ages ===
Croats settled the city starting in the 7th century. At the time, Rijeka was a feudal stronghold surrounded by a wall. At the center of the city, its highest point, was a fortress.

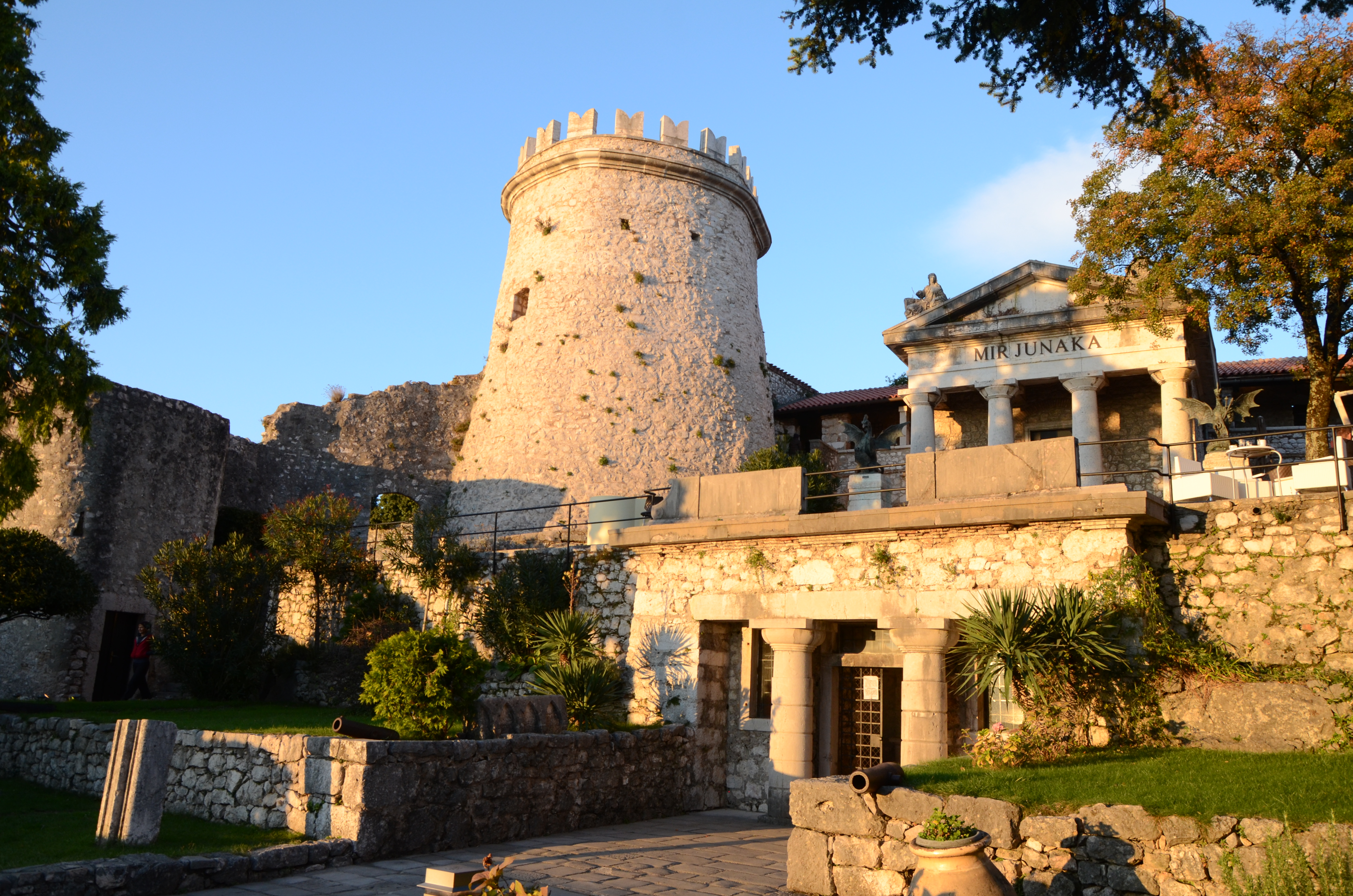
Trsat Castle lies at the exact spot of an ancient Illyrian and Roman fortress.

In 799 Rijeka was attacked by the Frankish troops of Charlemagne. Their Siege of Trsat was at first repulsed, during which the Frankish commander Duke Eric of Friuli was killed. However, the Frankish forces finally occupied and devastated the castle, while the Duchy of Croatia passed under the overlordship of the Carolingian Empire. From about 925, the town was part of the Kingdom of Croatia, from 1102 in personal union with Hungary. Trsat Castle and the town were rebuilt under the rule of the House of Frankopan. In 1288 the Rijeka citizens signed the Law codex of Vinodol, one of the oldest codes of law in Europe.

From about 1300 to 1466 Rijeka was ruled by a number of noble families, the most prominent of which was the German Walsee family. Rijeka even rivalled Venice when it was sold by Vitus Butinarius to the Habsburg emperor Frederick III, Archduke of Austria in 1466.

=== Under Habsburg rule ===
The city would remain under Austrian Habsburg rule for over 450 years (except for a brief period of French rule between 1809 and 1813) until the end of World War I in 1918.

Austrian presence on the Adriatic Sea was seen as a threat by the Republic of Venice and during the War of the League of Cambrai, the Venetians raided and devastated the city resulting in a large number of deaths in 1508 and again in 1509. However, the city recovered and remained under Austrian rule. For its fierce resistance to the Venetians it received the title of the "most loyal city" ("fidelissimum oppidium") as well as commercial privileges from the Austrian emperor Maximilian I in 1515. While Ottoman forces attacked the town several times, they never occupied it. From the 16th century onwards, Rijeka's present Renaissance and Baroque style started to take shape. Emperor Charles VI declared the Port of Rijeka a free port (together with the Port of Trieste) in 1719 and had the trade route to Vienna expanded in 1725.

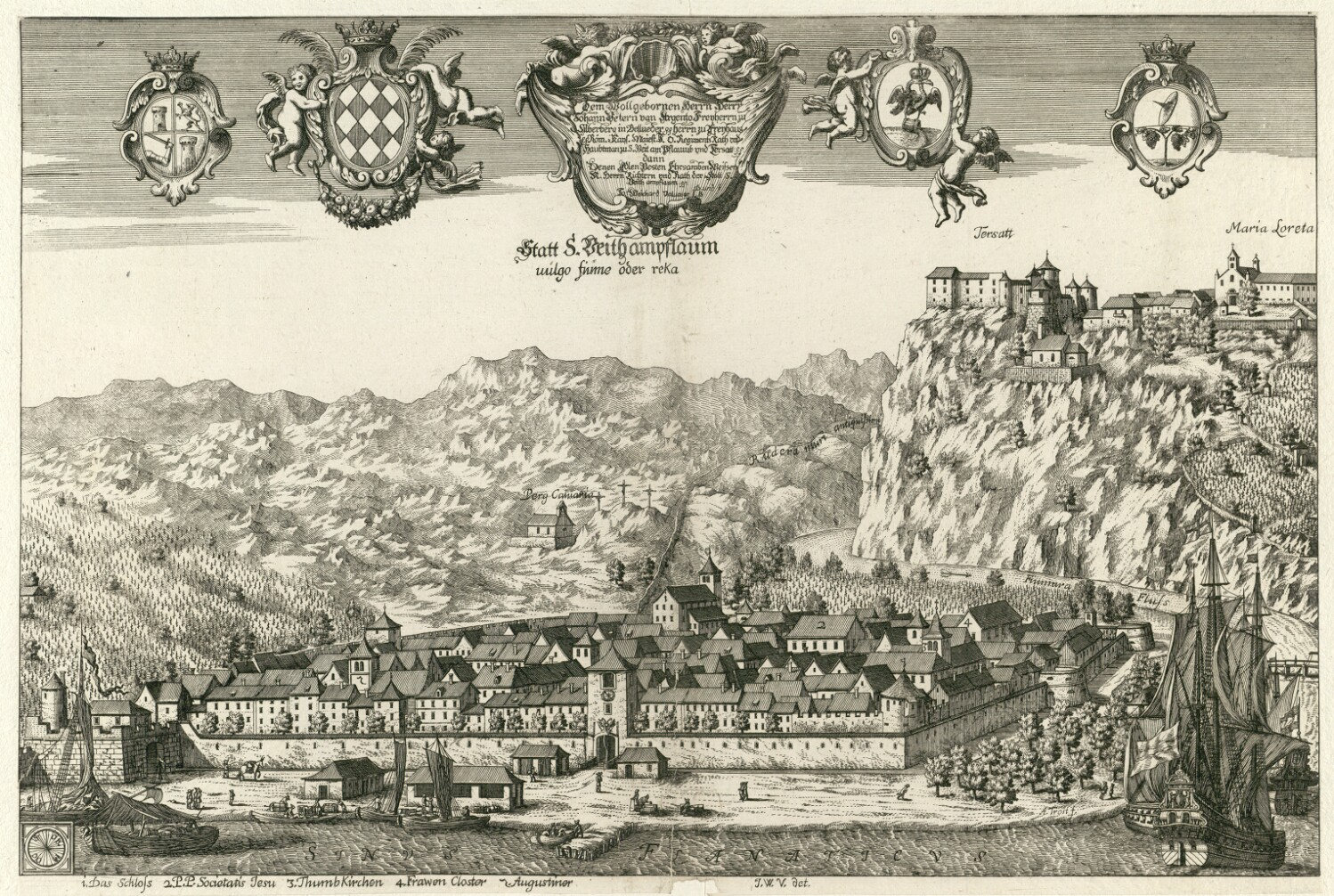
Rijeka and Trsat by Johann Weikhard von Valvasor (1689)

On November 28, 1750 Rijeka was hit by a large earthquake. The devastation was so widespread that the city had to be almost completely rebuilt. In 1753, the Austrian Empress Maria Theresa approved the funding for rebuilding Rijeka as a "new city" ("Civitas nova"). The rebuilt Rijeka was significantly different - it was transformed from a small medieval walled town into a larger commercial and maritime city centered around its port.

By order of Maria Theresa in 1779, the city was annexed to the Kingdom of Hungary and governed as corpus separatum directly from Budapest by an appointed governor, as Hungary's only international port. From 1804, Rijeka was part of the Austrian Empire (Kingdom of Croatia-Slavonia after the Compromise of 1867), in the Croatia-Slavonia province.

During the Napoleonic Wars, Rijeka was briefly captured by the French Empire and included in the Illyrian Provinces. During the French rule, between 1809 and 1813, the critically important Louisiana road was completed (named after Napoleon's wife Marie Louise). The road was the shortest route from Rijeka to the interior (Karlovac) and gave a strong impulse to the development of Rijeka's port. In 1813 the French rule came to an end when Rijeka was first bombarded by the Royal Navy and later re-captured by the Austrians under the command of the Irish general Laval Nugent von Westmeath. The British bombardment has an interesting side story. The city was apparently saved from annihilation by a young lady named Karolina Belinić who - amid the chaos and destruction of the bombardment - went to the English fleet commander and convinced him that further bombardment of the city was unnecessary (the small French garrison was quickly defeated and left the city). The legend of Karolina is warmly remembered by the population even today. Karolina Riječka (Caroline of Rijeka) became a folk hero and has been celebrated in plays, movies and even in a rock opera.

In the early 19th century, the most prominent economical and cultural leader of the city was Andrija Ljudevit Adamić.

Fiume also had a significant naval base, and in the mid-19th century it became the site of the Imperial and Royal Naval Academy (K.u.K. Marine-Akademie), where the Austro-Hungarian Navy trained its officer cadets.

==== Hungarian Crown ====
During the Hungarian revolution of 1848, when Hungary tried to gain independence from Austria, Rijeka was captured by the Croatian troops (loyal to Austria) commanded by Ban Josip Jelačić. The city was then annexed directly to Croatia, although it did keep a degree of autonomy.

Giovanni de Ciotta (mayor from 1872 to 1896) proved to be an authoritative local political leader. Under his leadership, an impressive phase of expansion of the city started, marked by major port development, fuelled by the general expansion of international trade and the city's connection (1873) to the Austro-Hungarian railway network. Modern industrial and commercial enterprises such as the Royal Hungarian Sea Navigation Company "Adria", a rival shipping company the Ungaro-Croata (established in 1891) and the Smith and Meynier paper mill (which operated the first steam engine in south-east Europe), situated in the Rječina canyon, producing cigarette paper sold around the world.

The second half of the 19th century and the beginning of the 20th century (up to World War I) was a period of great prosperity, rapid economic growth and technological dynamism for Rijeka. Many authors and witnesses describe Rijeka of this time as a rich, tolerant, well-to-do town which offered a good standard of living, with endless possibilities for making one's fortune. The Pontifical Delegate Celso Costantini noted in his diary "the religious indifference and apathy of the town". The further industrial development of the city included the first industrial scale oil refinery in Europe in 1882 and the first torpedo factory in the world in 1866, after Robert Whitehead, manager of the "Stabilimento Tecnico Fiumano" (an Austrian engineering company engaged in providing engines for the Austro-Hungarian Navy), designed and successfully tested the world's first torpedo. In addition to the Whitehead Torpedo Works, which opened in 1874, the oil refinery (1882) and the paper mill, many other industrial and commercial enterprises were established or expanded in these years. These include a rice husking and starch factory (one of the largest in the world), a wood and furniture company, a wheat elevator and mill, the Ganz-Danubius shipbuilding industries, a cocoa and chocolate factory, a brick factory, a tobacco factory (the largest in the Monarchy), a cognac distillery, a pasta factory, the Ossoinack barrel and chest factory, a large tannery, five foundries and many others. At the beginning of the 20th century more than half of the industrial capacity in Croatia (which was at that time mostly agrarian) was located in Rijeka.

Rijeka's Austro-Hungarian Marine Academy became a pioneering centre for high-speed photography. The Austrian physicist Peter Salcher working in the Academy took the first photograph of a bullet flying at supersonic speed in 1886, devising a technique that was later used by Ernst Mach in his studies of supersonic motion.

Rijeka's port underwent tremendous development fuelled by generous Hungarian investments, becoming the main maritime outlet for Hungary and the eastern part of the Austro-Hungarian Empire. By 1913–14, the port of Fiume became the tenth-busiest port in Europe. The population grew rapidly from only 21,000 in 1880 to 50,000 in 1910. Major civic buildings constructed at this time include the Governor's Palace, designed by the Hungarian architect Alajos Hauszmann. There was an ongoing competition between Rijeka and Trieste, the main maritime outlet for Austria—reflecting the rivalry between the two components of the Dual Monarchy. The Austro-Hungarian Navy sought to keep the balance by ordering new warships from the shipyards of both cities.

In the 19th century, the city was predominantly Italian-speaking, regardless of ethnic background. Italian nationalism arose in the city at the end of the century, and was less intense compared to autonomism. According to the census of 1880, 9,076 residents used Italian as their "habitual language", 7,991 Croatian, 895 German, and 383 Hungarian. The 1851 census reported a Croatian majority, though considered not very reliable by Italian historians. At the last Austro-Hungarian census in 1910, the corpus separatum had a population of 49,806 people and was composed of the following linguistic communities:

Languages in 1911	49,806 inhabitants	(100%)
Italian	23,283	(46.9%)
Croatian	15,731	(31.7%)
Slovenian	3,937	(7.9%)
Hungarian	3,619	(7.3%)
German	2,476	(5.0%)
English	202	(0.4%)
Czech	183	(0.3%)
Serbian	70	(0.14%)
French	40	(0.08%)
Polish	36	(0.07%)
Romanian	29	(0.06%)

By religion, the census of 1910 indicates that - from the total of 49,806 inhabitants - there were 45,130 Catholics, 1,696 Jewish, 1,123 Calvinist, 995 Orthodox and 311 Lutheran. The Jewish population expanded rapidly, particularly in the 1870s-1880s, and built a large synagogue in 1907 (which would be destroyed in 1944, during the German occupation, concurrent with the murder of most of the city's Jewish residents). On the eve of WWI, there were 165 inns, 10 hotels with restaurants, 17 cafés, 17 jewellers, 37 barbers and 265 tailor shops in Rijeka.

Rijeka in early 20th century
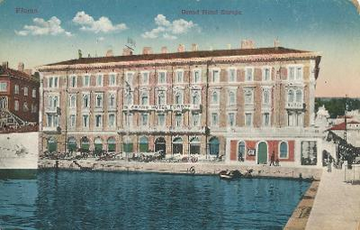
Grand Hotel Europa

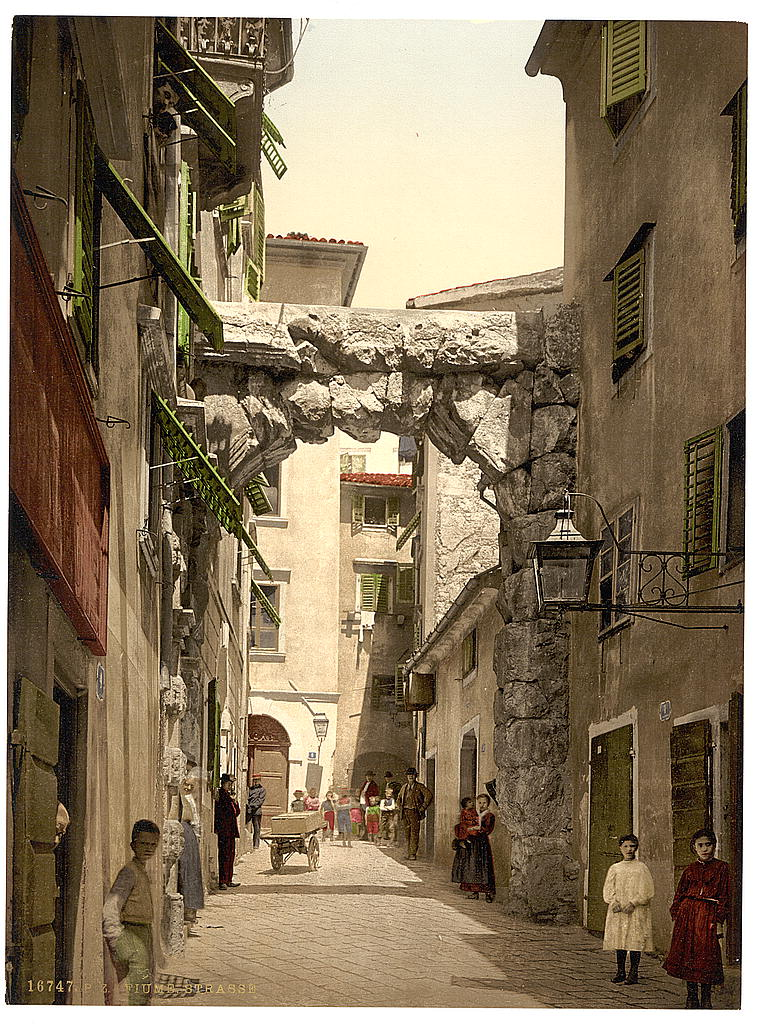
Rijeka, Roman Arch in the Old City, c.1900

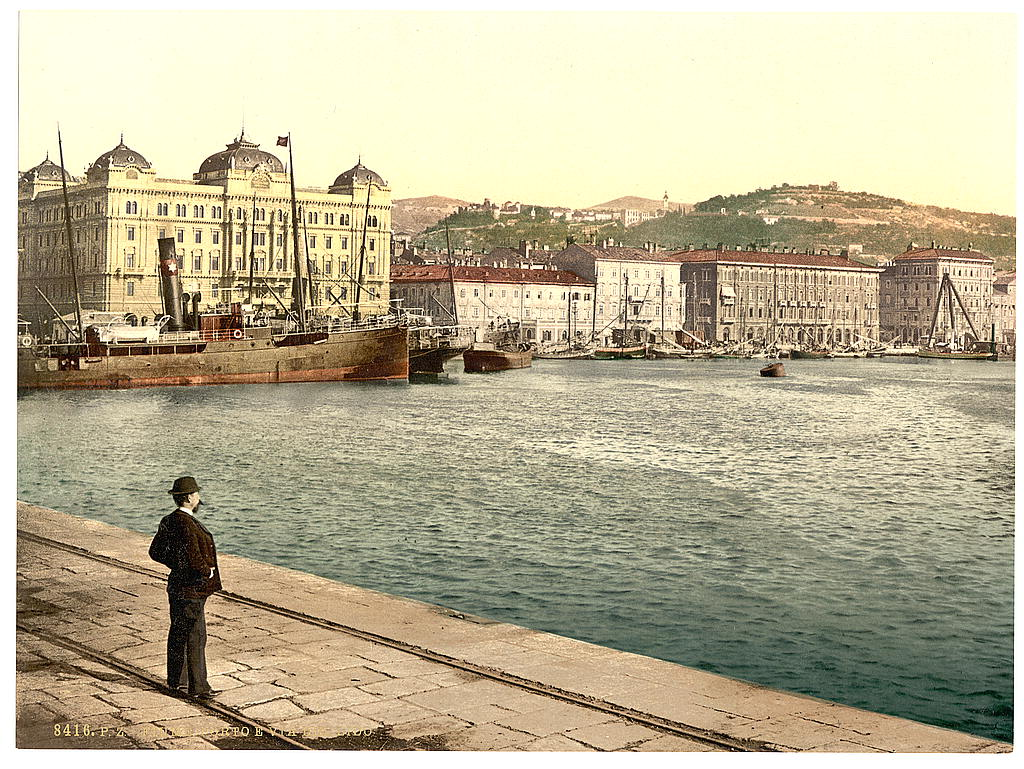
Rijeka Harbor, c.1900

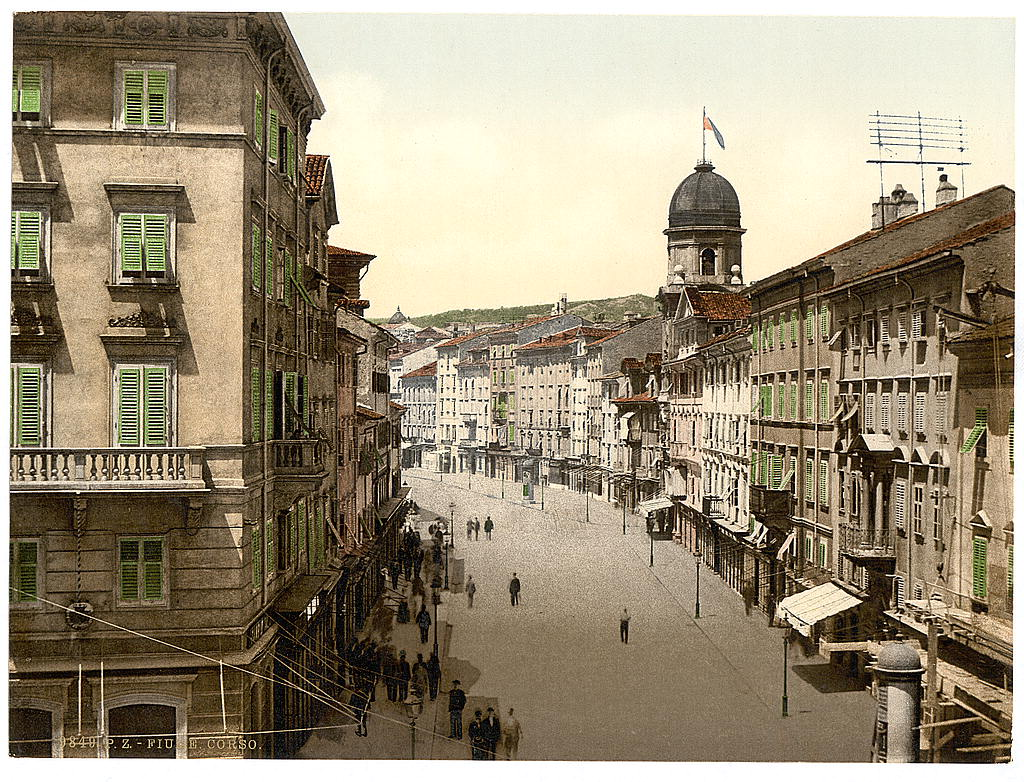
Rijeka - Corso, c. 1900

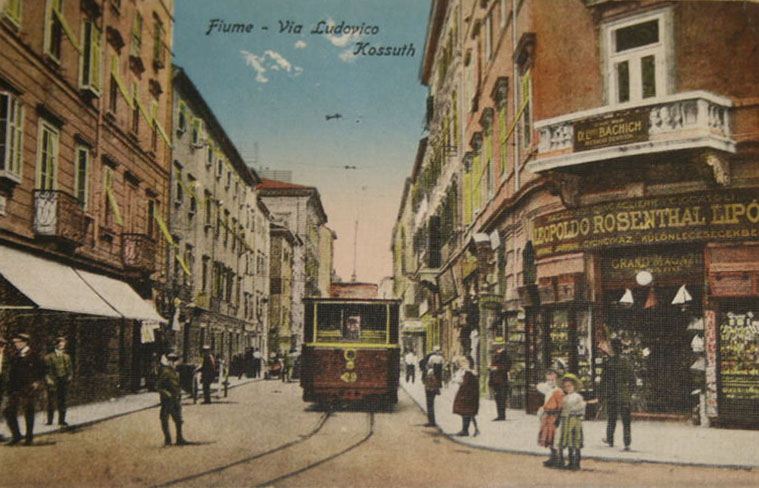
Tram in Rijeka, L. Kossuth Street, c.1910

=== World War I ===
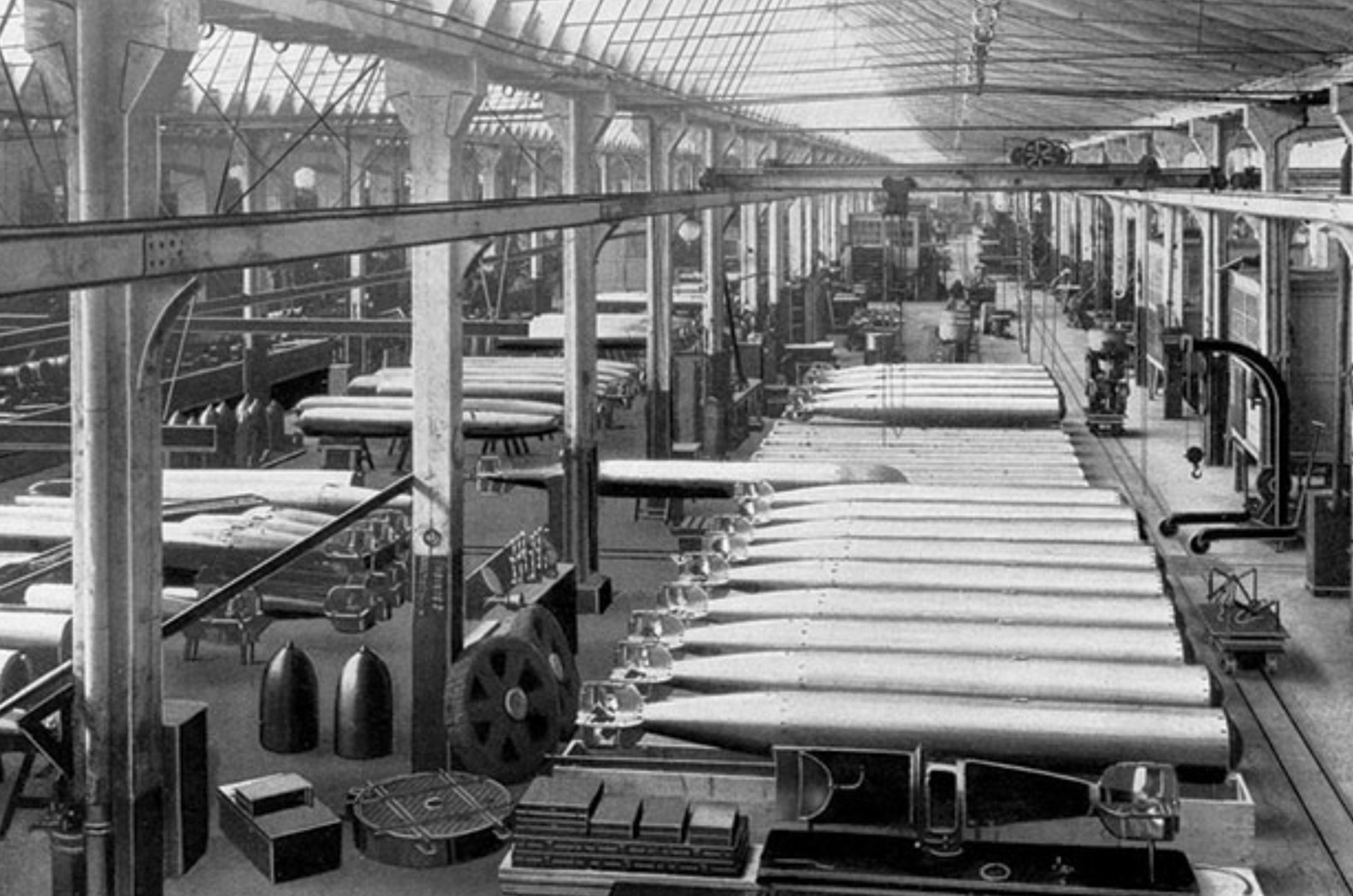
Torpedo production in Rijeka, (1914 circa)

World War I put an end to Rijeka's "golden era" of peace, stability and rapid economic growth. The city would never quite recover to the same level of prosperity. Initially there was a semblance of normalcy (the city was far from the frontlines), however - a growing part of the male population started to be mobilized by the army and the navy. The city's war-related industries continued to work at full steam and contributed significantly to the Austro-Hungarian war effort, especially to the navy. The shipyard Ganz-Danubius produced a number of warships and submarines like the U-27-class submarines, the Novara-class cruisers, the large battleship SMS Szent István and others. In total, between the early 1900s and 1918 the city's shipyards produced 1 battleship, 2 cruisers, 20 destroyers, 32 torpedo boats and 15 submarines for the navy. Rijeka was also the main center for the production of torpedoes. However, a lot changed with the war becoming a protracted conflict and especially with the Italian declaration of war on Austria-Hungary in May 1915. This opened a frontline only 90 km from the city and caused a pervasive sense of anxiety among the large Italian population. Several hundred Italians, considered disloyal (enemy non-combatants) by the authorities, were deported to camps in Hungary (Tápiósüly and Kiskunhalas), where many died of malnutrition and diseases. The torpedo factory was attacked by the Italian airship "Città di Novara" in 1915 (later shot down by Austrian hydroplanes) and suffered damages. As a consequence - most of the torpedo production was moved to Sankt Pölten in Austria, further away from the frontlines. The city was again attacked by Italian airplanes in 1916 and suffered minor damage. The Naval Academy ceased its activities and was converted to a war hospital (the ex-naval academy buildings are still housing the city hospital to this day). On 10 February 1918 the Italian navy raided the nearby bay of Bakar causing little material damage but achieving a significant propaganda effect. As the war dragged on, the city's economy and the living standard of the population deteriorated rapidly. Due to a maritime blockade, the port traffic suffered a collapse - from 2,892.538 tons in 1913 (before the war) to only 330.313 tons in 1918. Many factories - lacking manpower and/or raw materials - reduced the production or simply closed. Shortages of food and other basic necessities became widespread. Even public safety became a problem with an increase in the number of thefts, violent incidents and war profiteering. The crisis escalated on October 23, 1918, when the Croatian troops stationed in Rijeka (79th regiment) mutinied and temporarily took control of the city. Amid growing chaos, the Austro-Hungarian empire dissolved a few weeks later, on November 12, 1918, starting a long period of instability and uncertainty for the city.

=== The "Fiume Question" and the Italian-Yugoslav dispute ===
Habsburg-ruled Austria-Hungary's disintegration in October 1918 during the closing weeks of World War I led to the establishment of rival Croatian-Serbian and Italian administrations in the city; both Italy and the founders of the new Kingdom of the Serbs, Croats and Slovenes (later the Kingdom of Yugoslavia) claimed sovereignty based on their "irredentist" ("unredeemed") ethnic populations, and both in conflict with the autonomist stream which was dominant in the city and sympathized by the great powers gathered at the peace conference in Paris.

After a very brief military occupation by the Kingdom of Serbs, Croats and Slovenes, followed by the unilateral annexation act of the former Corpus Separatum by Belgrade, an international force of British, Italian, French and American troops entered the city in November 1918 to ensure the peace. Its future became a major barrier to agreement during the Paris Peace Conference of 1919. The US president Wilson leaned toward making Rijeka a free city-state, even proposing it for the headquarters of the newly formed League of Nations.

The main problem arose from the fact that Rijeka was not assigned either to Italy or to Croatia (which became part of Yugoslavia in the meanwhile) in the Treaty of London which defined the post-war borders in the area. It remained assigned to Austria-Hungary because - until the very end of WWI - it was assumed that the Austro-Hungarian empire would survive WWI in some form and Rijeka was to become its only seaport (Trieste was to be annexed by Italy). However, once the empire disintegrated, the status of the city became disputed. Italy based its claim on the fact that Italians comprised the largest single nationality within the city (46.9% of the total population), while Croats made up most of the remainder and were a majority in the surrounding area. Andrea Ossoinack, who had been the last delegate from Fiume to the Hungarian Parliament, was admitted to the conference as a representative of Fiume, and essentially supported the Italian claims, while Ruggero Gotthardi represented the auonomist idea and proposed a Free State of Rijeka with borders. Nevertheless, at this point the city had had for years a strong and very active Autonomist Party seeking for Rijeka a special independent status among nations as a multicultural Adriatic city. This movement even had its delegate at the Paris peace conference - Ruggero Gotthardi.

=== Regency of Carnaro ===
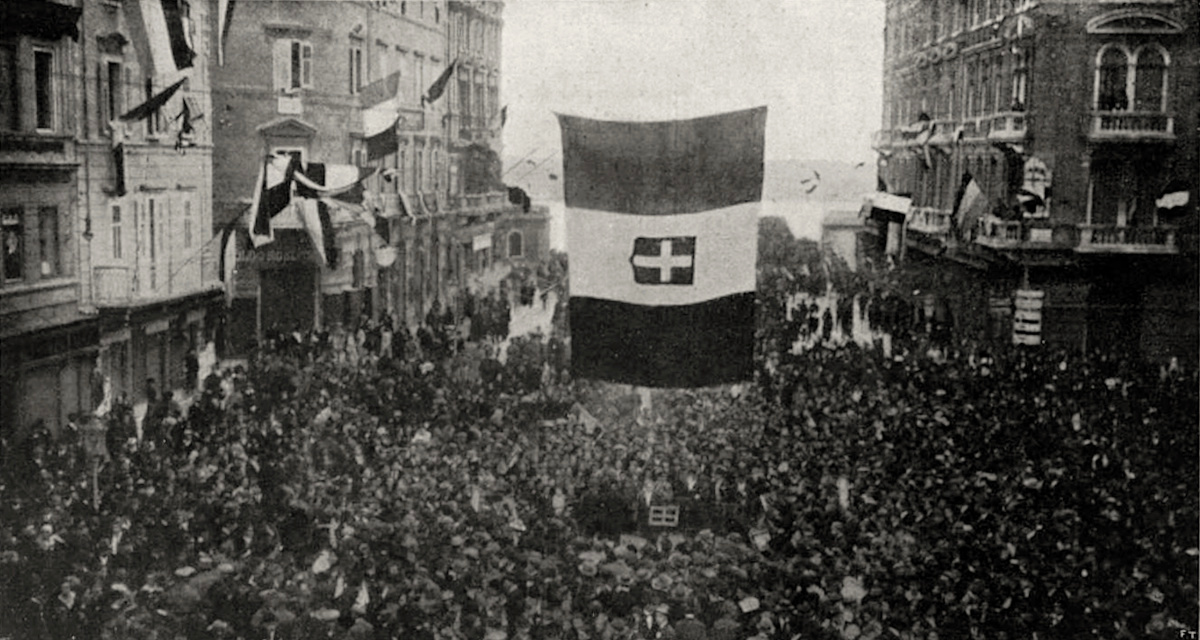
The Italian king Victor Emmanuel III birthday celebration on 11 November 1918 in Fiume/Rijeka.

On 10 September 1919, the Treaty of Saint-Germain was signed, declaring the Austro-Hungarian monarchy dissolved. Negotiations over the future of the city were interrupted two days later when a force of Italian nationalist irregulars led by the poet Gabriele D'Annunzio captured the city. Because the Italian government, wishing to respect its international obligations, did not want to annex Fiume, D'Annunzio and the intellectuals at his side eventually established an independent state, the Italian Regency of Carnaro, a unique social experiment for the age and a revolutionary cultural experience in which various international intellectuals of diverse walks of life took part (like Osbert Sitwell, Arturo Toscanini, Henry Furst, Filippo Tommaso Marinetti, Harukichi Shimoi, Guglielmo Marconi, Alceste De Ambris, Whitney Warren and Léon Kochnitzky).

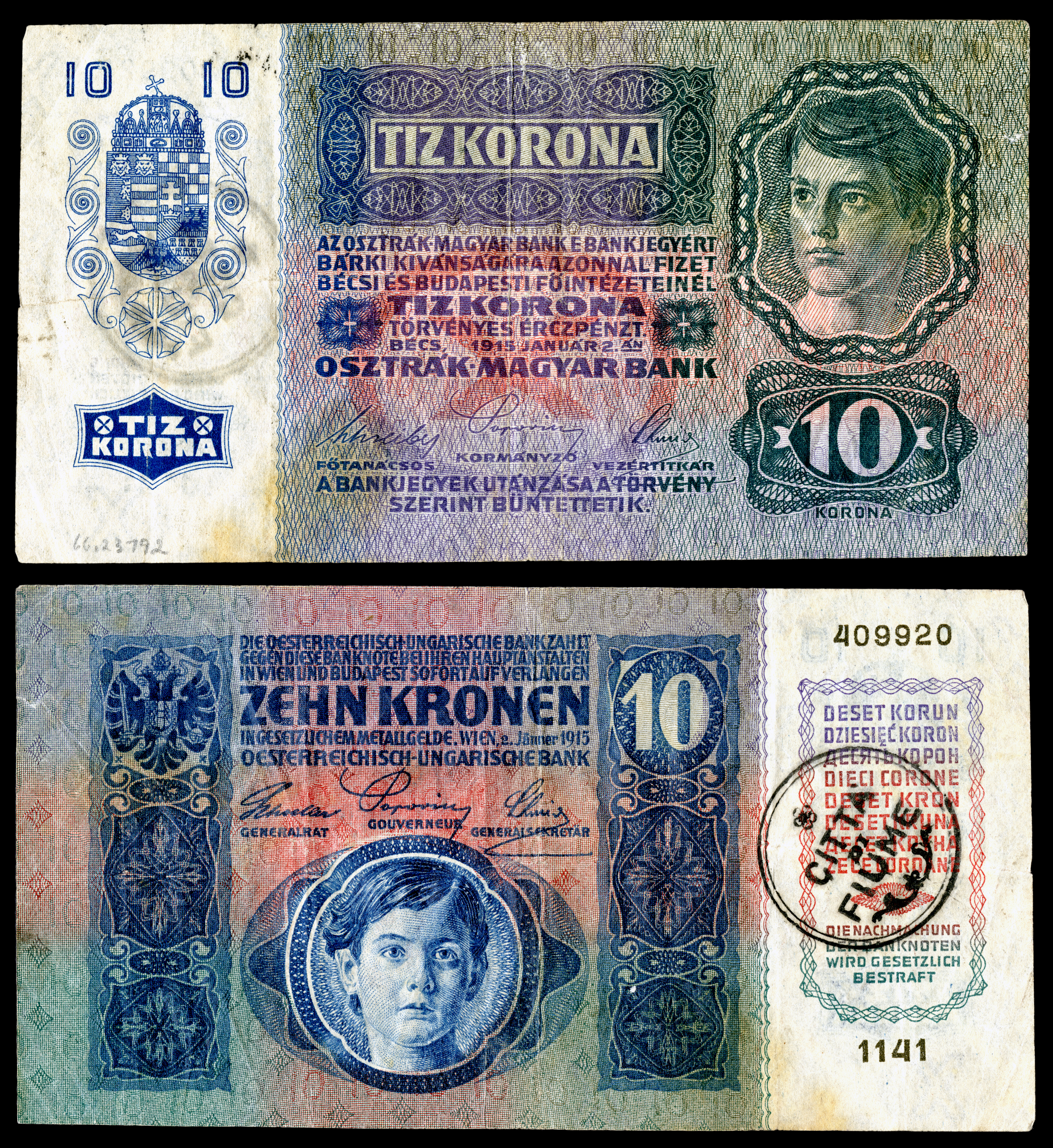
10 Fiume krone provisional banknote (1920)

Among the many political experiments that took place during this experience, D'Annunzio and his men undertook a first attempt to establish a movement of non-aligned nations in the so-called League of Fiume, an organisation antithetic to the Wilsonian League of Nations, which it saw as a means of perpetuating a corrupt and imperialist status quo. The organisation was aiming primarily at helping all oppressed nationalities in their struggle for political dignity and recognition, establishing links with many movements on various continents, but it never found the necessary external support and its main legacy remains today the Regency of Carnaro's recognition of Soviet Russia, the first state in the world to have done so.

The Liberal Giovanni Giolitti became Premier of Italy again in June 1920; this signalled a hardening of official attitudes to D'Annunzio's coup. On 12 November, Italy and Yugoslavia concluded the Treaty of Rapallo, which envisaged Fiume becoming an independent state, the Free State of Fiume, under a government acceptable to both powers. D'Annunzio's response was characteristically flamboyant and of doubtful judgment: his declaration of war against Italy invited the bombardment by Italian royal forces which led to his surrender of the city at the end of the year, after five days' resistance (known as Bloody Christmas). Italian troops freed the city from D'Annunzio's militias in the last days of December 1920. After a world war and additional two years of economic paralysis the city economy was nearing collapse and the population was exhausted.

=== Free State of Fiume ===
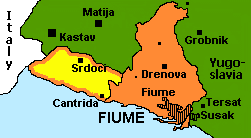
Location of the Free State of Fiume (1920–1924)

In a subsequent democratic election the Fiuman electorate on 24 April 1921 approved the idea of a free state of Fiume-Rijeka with a Fiuman-Italo-Yugoslav consortium ownership structure for the port, giving an overwhelming victory to the independentist candidates of the Autonomist Party. Fiume became consequently a full-fledged member of the League of Nations and the ensuing election of Rijeka's first president, Riccardo Zanella, was met with official recognition and greetings from all major powers and countries worldwide. Despite many positive developments leading to the establishment of the new state's structures, the subsequent formation of a constituent assembly for the state did not put an end to strife within the city. A brief Italian nationalist seizure of power ended with the intervention of an Italian royal commissioner, and another short-lived peace was interrupted by a local Fascist putsch in March 1922 which ended with a third Italian intervention to restore the previous order. Seven months later the Kingdom of Italy itself fell under Fascist rule and Fiume's fate was therefore sealed, the Italian Fascist Party being among the strongest proponents of the annexation of Fiume to Italy. The Free State of Fiume thus was to officially become the first country victim of fascist expansionism.

=== The territory of Fiume part of the Kingdom of Italy ===
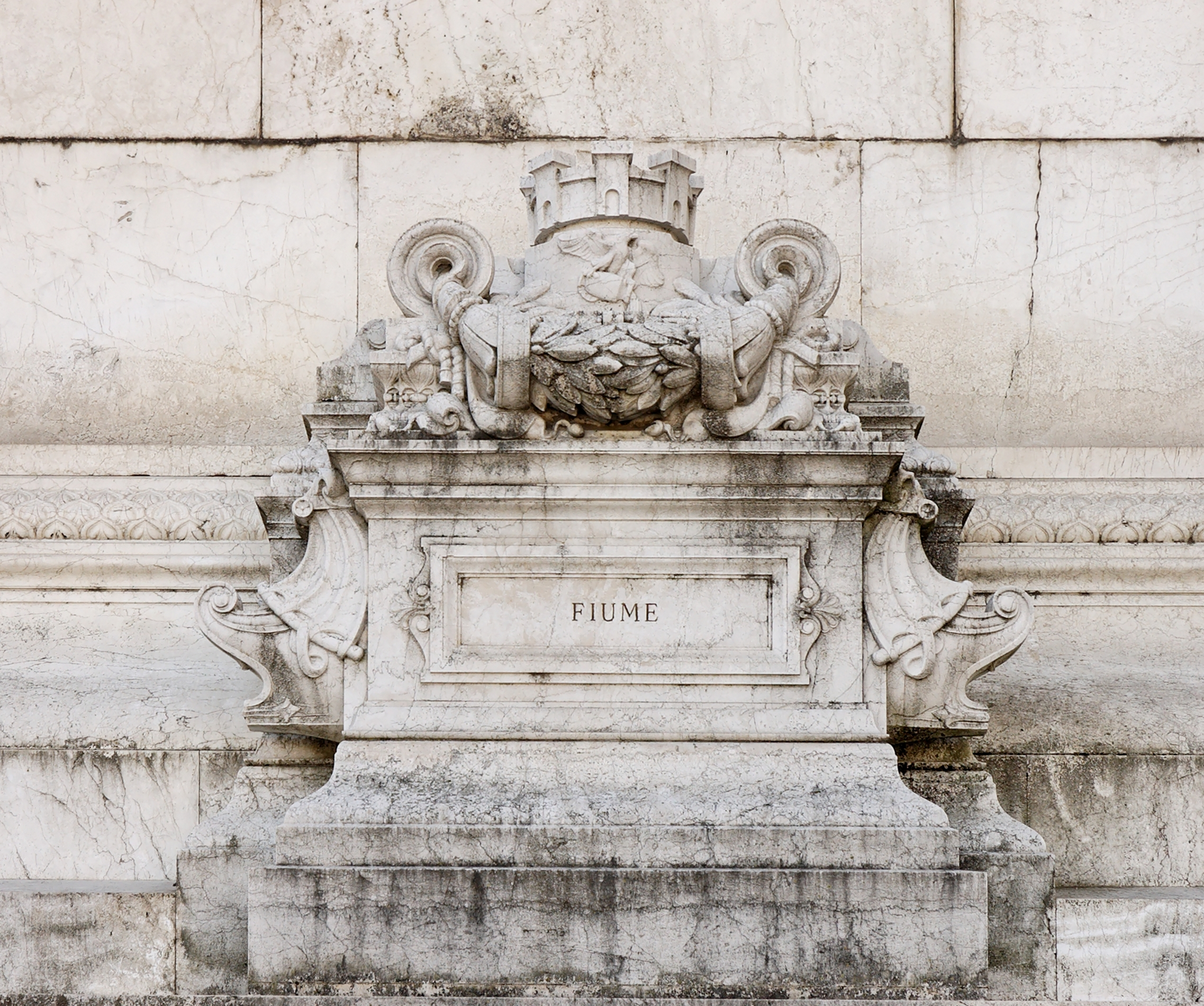
Altar of the city of Fiume at the Altare della Patria in Rome, Italy. Fiume was at the time a so-called "irredent land"

The period of diplomatic acrimony was closed by the bilateral Treaty of Rome (27 January 1924), signed by Italy and Yugoslavia. With it the two neighbouring countries agreed to partition the territory of the small state. Most of the old Corpus Separatum territory became part of Italy, while a few Croatian/Slovenian-speaking villages to the north of the city were annexed by Yugoslavia. The annexation happened de facto on 16 March 1924, and it inaugurated about twenty years of Italian government for the city proper, to the detriment of the Croatian minority, which fell victim of discrimination and targeted assimilation policies.

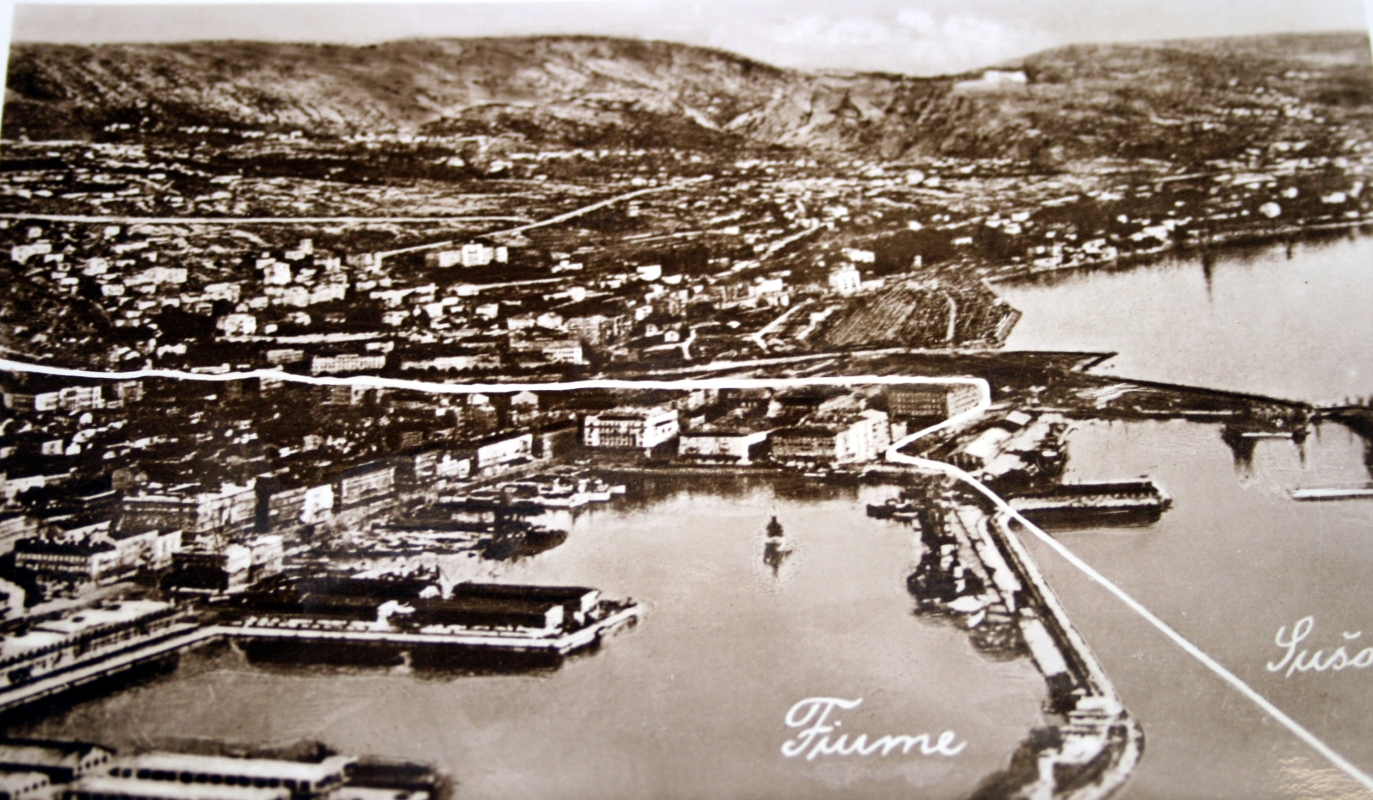
Fiume (Rijeka) in 1937

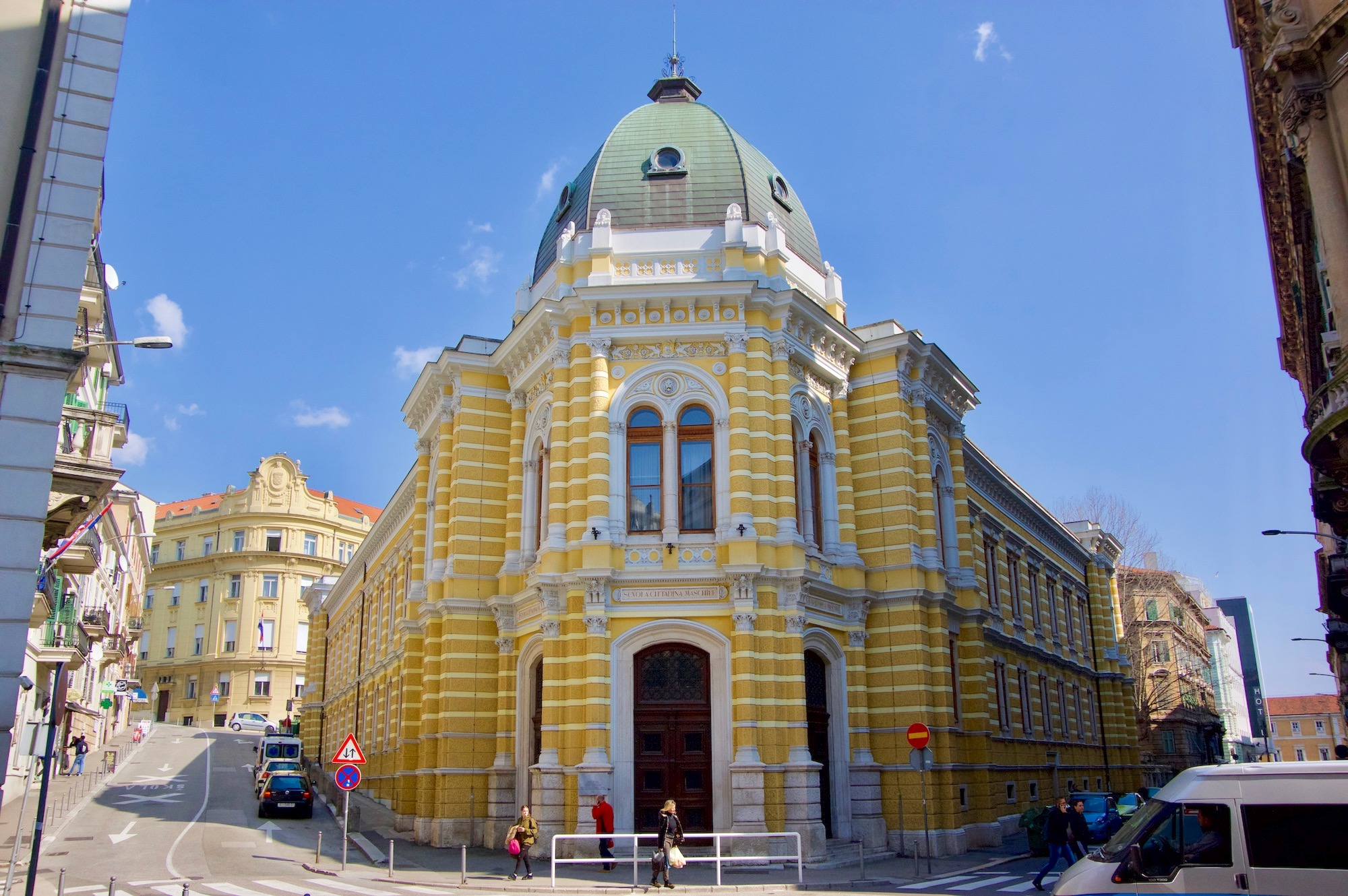
Italian Secondary School

The city became the seat of the newly formed Province of Fiume. In this period Fiume lost its commercial hinterland and thus part of its economic potential as it became a border town with little strategic importance for the Kingdom of Italy. However, since it retained the Free Port status and its iconic image in the nation-building myth, it gained many economic concessions and subsidies from the government in Rome. These included a separate tax treatment from the rest of Italy and a continuous inflow of investments from the Italian state (although not as generous as previous Hungarian ones). The city regained a good level of economic prosperity and was much richer than the surrounding Yugoslav lands, but the economic and demographic growth slowed down if compared to the previous Austro-Hungarian period.

Coat of Arms in use during the italian domain of the city, approved in 1935

Variant of the flag with the Coat of Arms

=== World War II and the German Operational Zone ===
At the beginning of World War II Rijeka immediately found itself in an awkward position. The city's largest demographic was Italian followed by Croatian constituting most of the remainder, but its immediate surroundings and the city of Sušak, just across the Rječina river (today a part of Rijeka proper) were inhabited almost exclusively by Croatians and part of a potentially hostile power—Yugoslavia. Once the Axis powers invaded Yugoslavia in April 1941, the Croatian areas surrounding the city were occupied by the Italian military, setting the stage for an intense and bloody insurgency which would last until the end of the war. Partisan activity included guerrilla-style attacks on isolated positions or supply columns, sabotage and killings of civilians believed to be connected to the Italian and (later) German authorities. This, in turn, was met by stiff reprisals from the Italian and German military. On 14 July 1942, in reprisal for the killing of four civilians of Italian origin by Partisans, the Italian military killed 100 men from the suburban village of Podhum, resettling the remaining 800 people to concentration camps, in the Podhum massacre.

After the surrender of Italy to the Allies in September 1943, Rijeka and the surrounding territories were occupied and annexed by Germany, becoming part of the Adriatic Littoral Zone. Partisan activity continued and intensified. On 30 April 1944, in the nearby village of Lipa, German troops killed 263 civilians, now known as the Lipa massacre, in reprisal for the killing of several soldiers during a Partisan attack.

The German and Italian occupiers and their local collaborators deported some 80 percent of the city's roughly 500 Jews to Auschwitz. A larger proportion of Rijeka's Jewish population was murdered in the Holocaust than that of any other city in Italian territory.

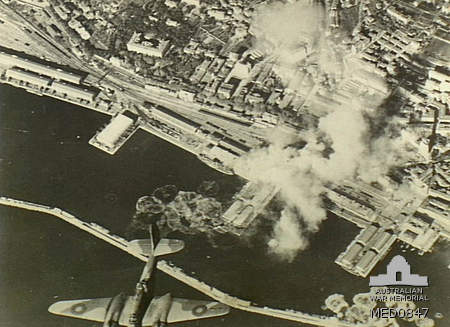
Rijeka under aerial bombardment by the Royal Air Force, 1944

Because of its industries (oil refinery, torpedo factory, shipyards) and its port facilities, the city was also a target of more than 30 Anglo-American air attacks, which caused widespread destruction and hundreds of civilian deaths. Some of the heaviest bombardments happened on 12 January 1944 (attack on the refinery, part of the oil campaign), on 3–6 November 1944, when a series of attacks resulted in at least 125 deaths and between 15 and 25 February 1945 (200 dead, 300 wounded).

The area of Rijeka was heavily fortified even before World War II (the remains of these fortifications can be seen today on the outskirts of the city). This was the fortified border between Italy and Yugoslavia which, at that time, cut across the city area and its surroundings. As Yugoslav troops approached the city in April 1945, one of the fiercest and largest battles in this area of Europe ensued. The 27,000 German and additional Italian RSI troops fought tenaciously from behind these fortifications (renamed "Ingridstellung"—Ingrid Line—by the Germans). Under the command of the German general Ludwig Kübler they inflicted thousands of casualties on the attacking Partisans, which were forced by their superiors to charge uphill against well-fortified positions to the north and east of the city. The Yugoslav commanders did not spare casualties to speed up the capture of the city, fearing a possible English landing in area which would prevent their advance towards Trieste before the war was over. After an extremely bloody battle and heavy losses on the attackers side, the Germans were forced to retreat. Before leaving the city the German troops destroyed much of the harbour area and other important infrastructure with explosive charges. However, the German attempt to break out of the encirclement north-west of the city was unsuccessful. Of the approximately 27,000 German and other troops retreating from the city, 11,000 were killed or executed after surrendering, while the remaining 16,000 were taken as prisoners. Yugoslav troops entered Rijeka on 3 May 1945. The city had suffered extensive damage in the war. The economic infrastructure was almost completely destroyed, and of the 5,400 buildings in the city at the time, 2,890 (53%) were either completely destroyed or damaged.

=== Aftermath of World War II ===
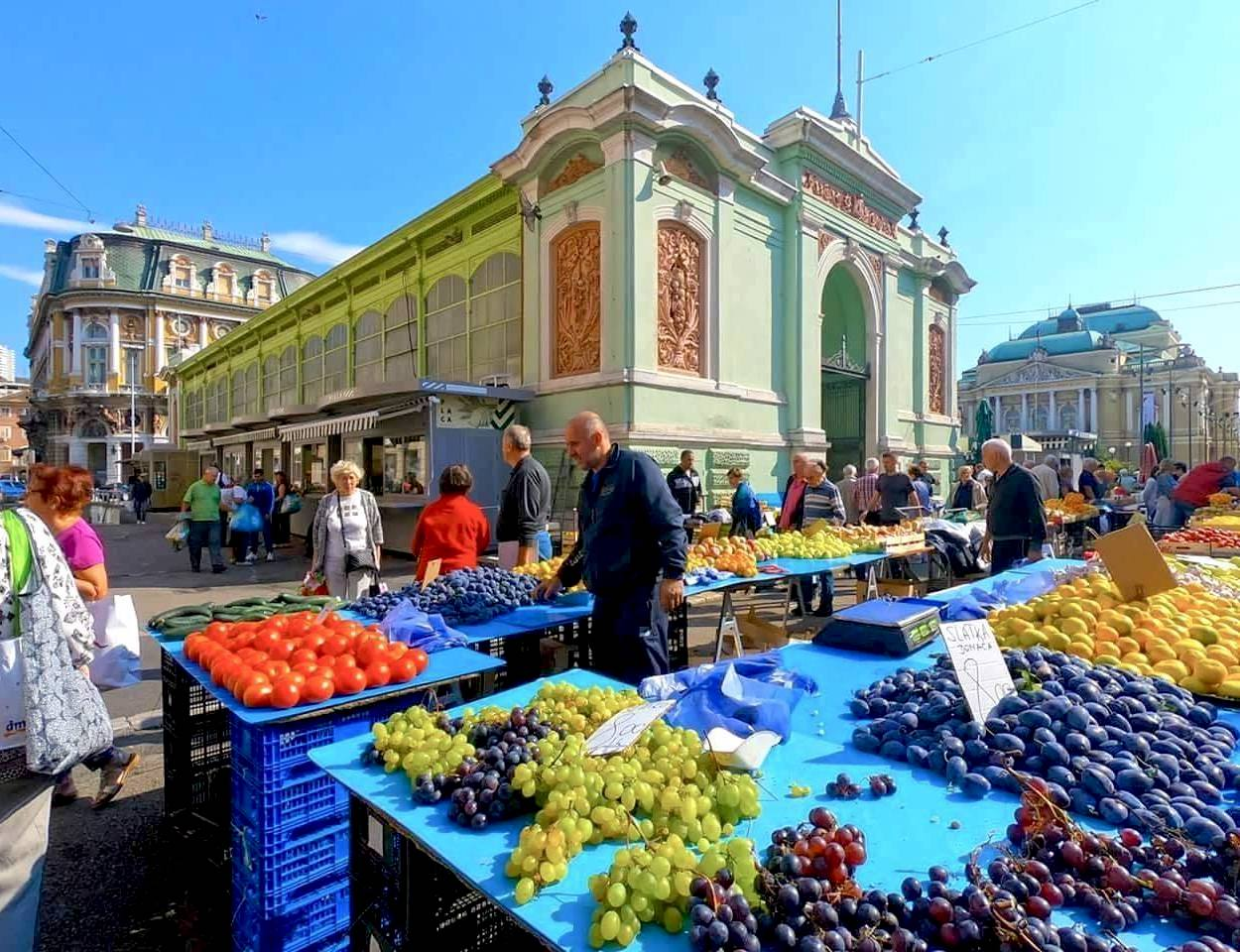
Rijeka City Market with Palace Modello on the left and Ivan Zajc Croatian National Theatre on the right

After the war, the city was placed under Yugoslav administration as part of Zone B of the Julian March, and, following the Paris peace treaty, formally ceded to Yugoslavia as a part of the federal state of Croatia. Once the change to Yugoslav sovereignty was formalized, and in particular in the years leading to the Trieste Crisis of 1954, 58,000 of the city's 66,000 inhabitants gradually opted to emigrate they became known in Italian as esuli or the exiled ones and optanti in Croatian and Slovene.

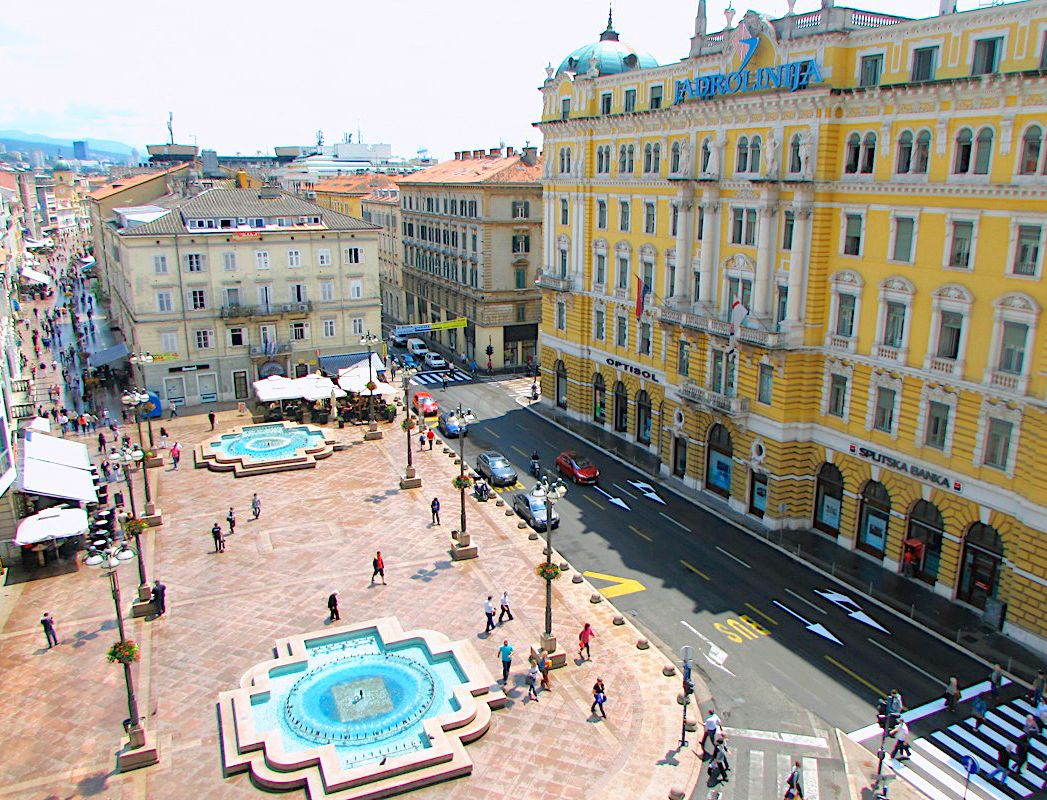
Adriatic Square with Jadran Palace, headquarters of Jadrolinija

The discrimination and persecution that many inhabitants experienced at the hands of Yugoslav officials in the last days of World War II and the first years of peace, still remain painful memories for the locals and the esuli, and are somewhat of a taboo topic for Rijeka's political milieu, which is still largely denying the events. Summary executions of alleged Fascists (often well-known anti-fascists or openly apolitical), aimed at hitting the local intellectual class, the Autonomists, the commercial classes, the former Italian public servants, the military officials and often also ordinary civilians (at least 650 executions of Italians took place after the end of the war) eventually forced most Italophones (of various ethnicities) to leave Rijeka/Fiume in order to avoid becoming victims of a harsher retaliation. The removal was a meticulously planned operation, aimed at convincing the hardly assimilable Italian part of the autochthonous population to leave the country, as testified decades later by representatives of the Yugoslav leadership.

The most notable victims of the political and ethnic repression of locals in this period was the Fiume Autonomists purge hitting all the autonomist figures still living in the city, and now associated in the Liburnian Autonomist Movement. The Autonomists actively helped the Yugoslav partisans in liberating the region from Fascist and Nazi occupation, and, despite receiving various promises of large political autonomy for the city, they were eventually all assassinated by the Yugoslav secret police OZNA in the days leading up to the Yugoslav army's victorious march into city and its aftermath.

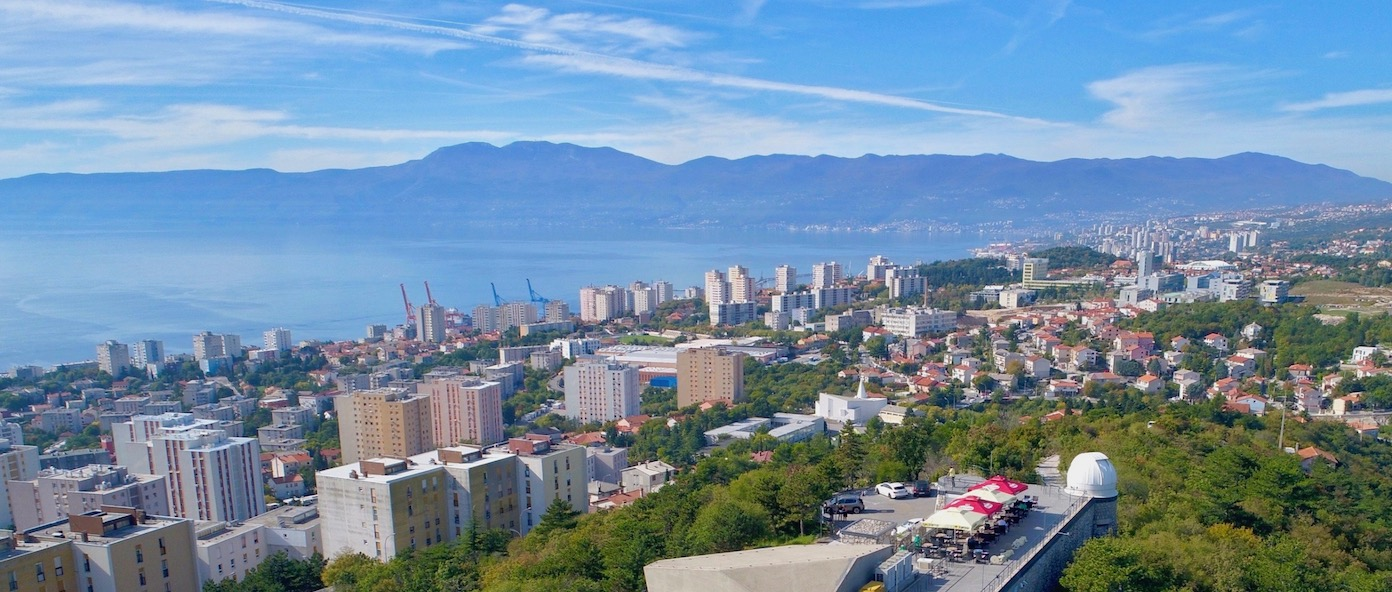
Urban development of Rijeka today

In subsequent years, the Yugoslav authorities joined the municipalities of Rijeka and Sušak and, after 1954, less than one third of the original population of the now united municipalities (mostly what was previously the Croat minority in Fiume and the majority in Sušak) remained in the city, because the old municipality of Fiume lost in these years more than 85% of the original population. The Yugoslav plans for a more obedient demographic situation in Rijeka culminated in 1954 during the Trieste crisis, when the Yugoslav Communist Party rallied many local members to ruin or destroy the most notable vestiges of the Italian/Venetian language and all bilingual inscriptions in the city (which had been legally granted a fully bilingual status after the occupation in 1945), eventually also 'de facto' (but not 'de jure') deleting bilinguilism, except in a handful of selected bilingual schools and inside the Italian Community's own building. After the war the local ethnic Italians of Rijeka left Yugoslavia for Italy (Istrian-Dalmatian exodus).

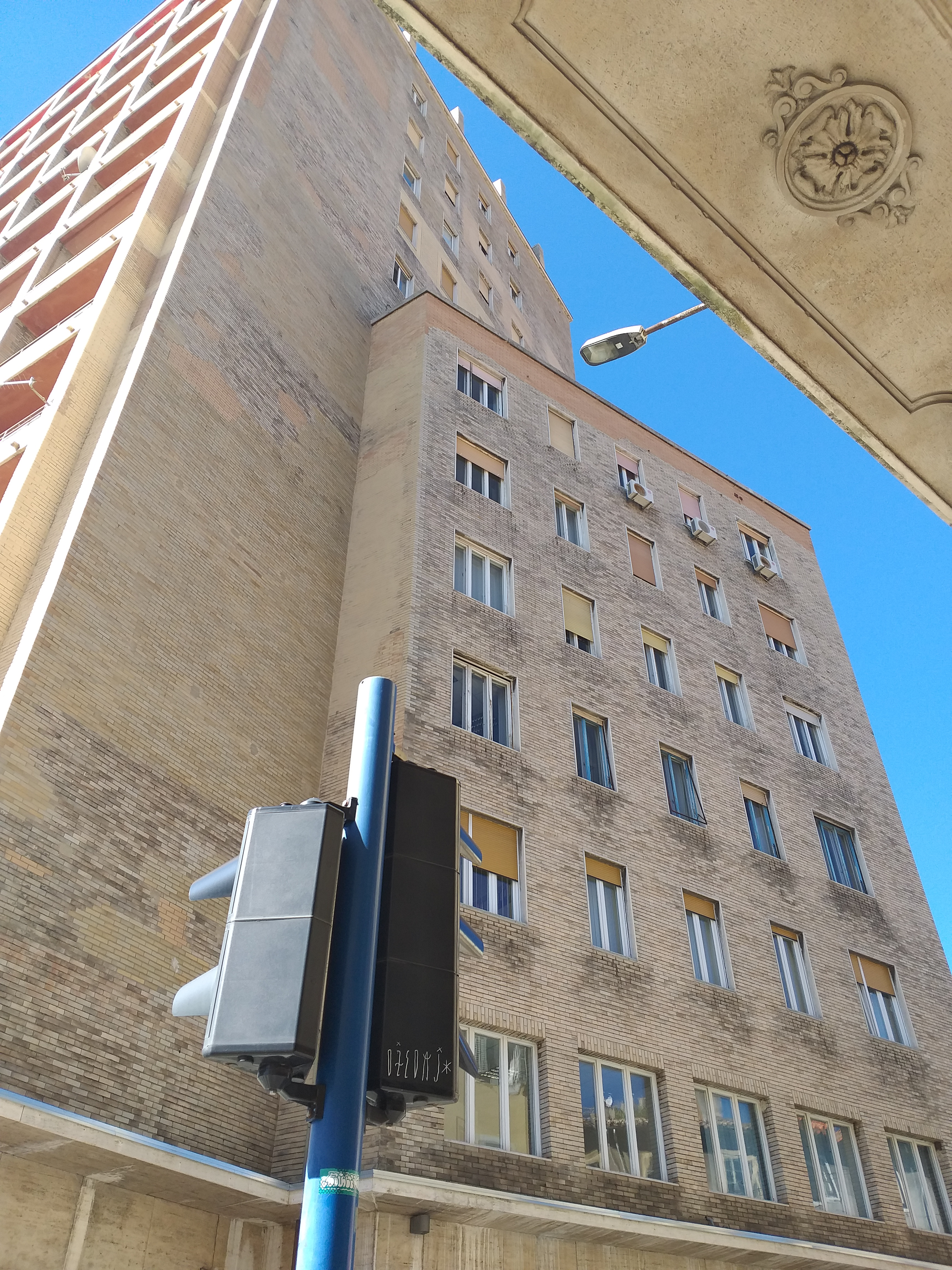
Fiume Skyscraper, first skyscraper in Rijeka (1942)

The city was then resettled by immigrants from various parts of Yugoslavia, once more changing heavily the city's demographics and its linguistic composition. These years coincided also with a period of general reconstruction and new program of industrialization after the destruction of the war. During the period of the Yugoslav Communist administration between the 1950s and the 1980s, the city became the main port of the Federal Republic and started to grow once again, both demographically and economically, taking advantage of the newly re-established hinterland that had been lacking during the Italian period, as well as the rebuilding after the war of its traditional manufacturing industries, its maritime economy and its port potential. This, paired with its rich commercial history, allowed the city to soon become the second richest (GDP per capita) district within Yugoslavia. However, many of these industries and companies, being based on a socialist planned economic model were not able to survive the move to a market-oriented economy in the early 1990s.

As Yugoslavia broke up in 1991, the former Federal State of Croatia became independent and, in the Croatian War of Independence that ensued, Rijeka became part of the newly independent Croatia. Since then, the city has stagnated economically and its demography has plunged. Some of its largest industries and employers have gone out of business, the most prominent among them being the Jugolinija shipping company, the torpedo factory, the paper mill and many other small or medium manufacturing and commercial companies. Other companies have struggled to remain economically viable (like the city's landmark 3. Maj shipyard). The number of people working in manufacturing dropped from more than 80,000 in 1990 to only 5,000 two decades later. Privatization scandals and the large scale corruption which marked Croatia's transition from socialism to capitalism as well as several years of war economy played a significant role in the collapse of the city's economy during the 1990s and early 2000s. A difficult and uncertain transition of the city's economy away from manufacturing and towards an economy based on services and tourism is still in progress.

On 27 November 2019, a waterspout of intensity IF1 made landfall in the city of Rijeka, causing tree, roof and car damage along a narrow path.

In 2020, Rijeka was voted the European Capital of Culture alongside Galway, with a planned program including more than 600 events of cultural and social importance.

== Culture ==
=== Languages ===
Linguistically, apart from Croatian and Italian, the city is home to its own unique dialect of the Venetian language, Fiuman, with an estimated 20,000 speakers among the local Italians, Croats and other minorities. Historically, Fiuman served as the main lingua franca among the many ethnicities inhabiting the multi-ethnic port city. In certain suburbs of the modern extended municipality the autochthonous (native) population still speaks Chakavian, a dialect of Croatian.

=== Carnival ===
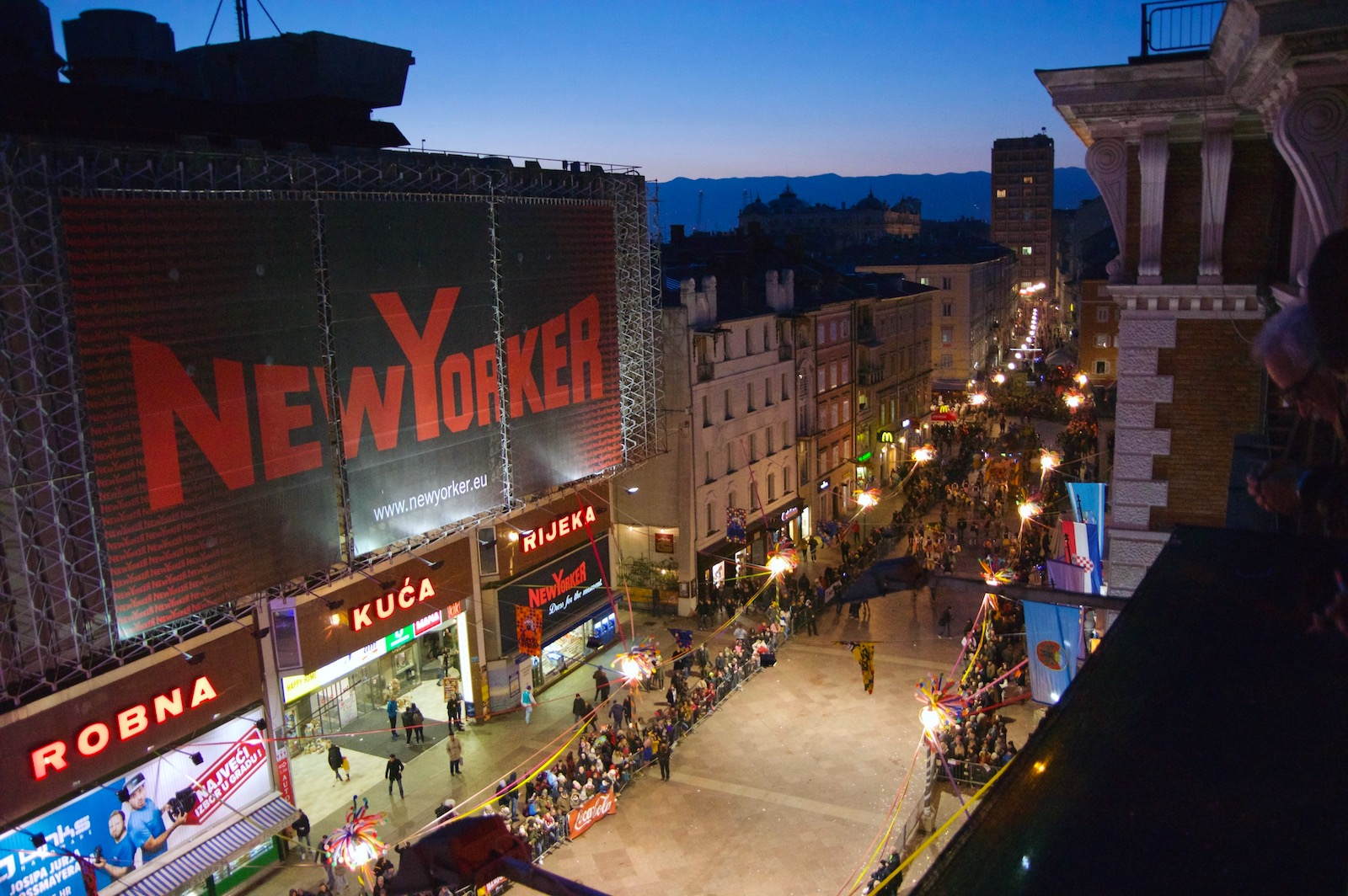
Rijeka Carnival

The Rijeka Carnival (Croatian: Riječki karneval) is held each year before Lent (between late January and early March) in Rijeka, Croatia. Established in 1982, it has become the biggest carnival in Croatia. Every year there are numerous events preceding the carnival itself. First the mayor of Rijeka gives the symbolic key of the city to Meštar Toni, who is "the maestro" of the carnival, and he becomes the mayor of the city during the carnival, although this is only figuratively. On the same day, the carnival queen is elected. As all the cities around Rijeka have their own events during the carnival time, Queen and Meštar Toni are attending most of them.

Also, every year the Carnival charity ball is held in the Governor's palace in Rijeka. It is attended by politicians, people from sport and media life, as well as a number of ambassadors.

The weekend before the main event there are two other events held. One is Rally Paris–Bakar (after the Dakar Rally). The start is a part of Rijeka called Paris after the restaurant located there, and the end is in city of Bakar, located about 20 kilometres (12 miles) south-east. All of the participants of the rally wear masks, and the cars are mostly modified old cars. The other event is the children's carnival, held, like the main one, on Rijeka's main walkway Korzo. The groups that participate are mostly from kindergartens and elementary schools, including groups from other parts of Croatia and neighboring countries. In 1982 there were only three masked groups on Rijeka's main walkway Korzo. In recent years, the international carnival has attracted around 15,000 participants from all over the world organized in over 200 carnival groups, with crowds of over 100,000.

=== Cinema ===
"Fiume o Morte!", directed by Igor Bezinović and produced by Erica Barbiani and Lucia Candelpergher for Videomante, is a recent production (2025) mixing documentary and fiction.

=== Religion ===
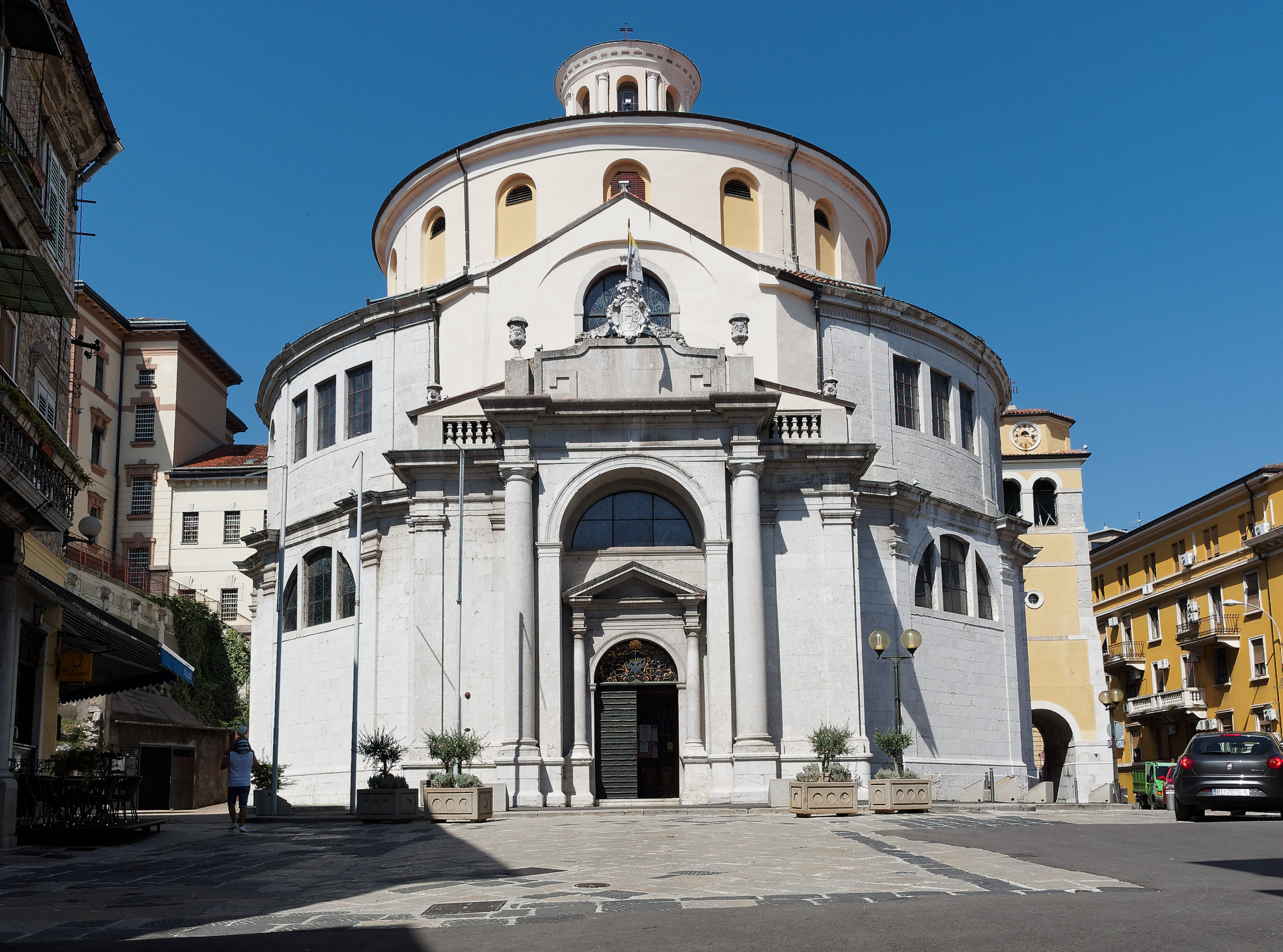
Rijeka Cathedral

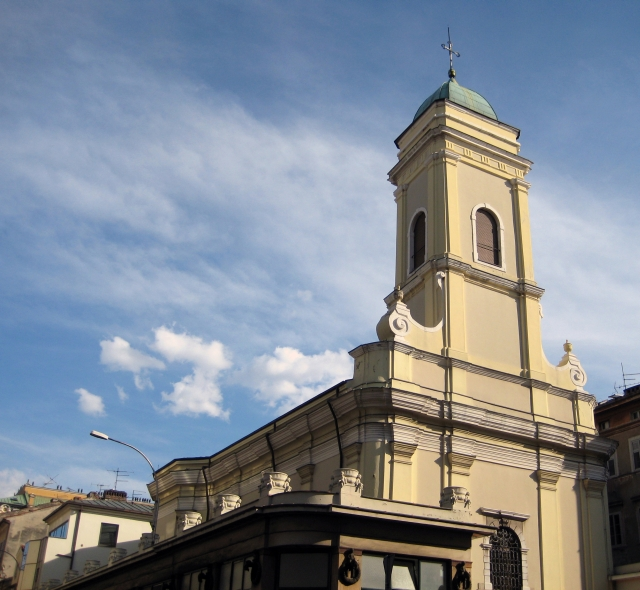
Church of St. Nicholas

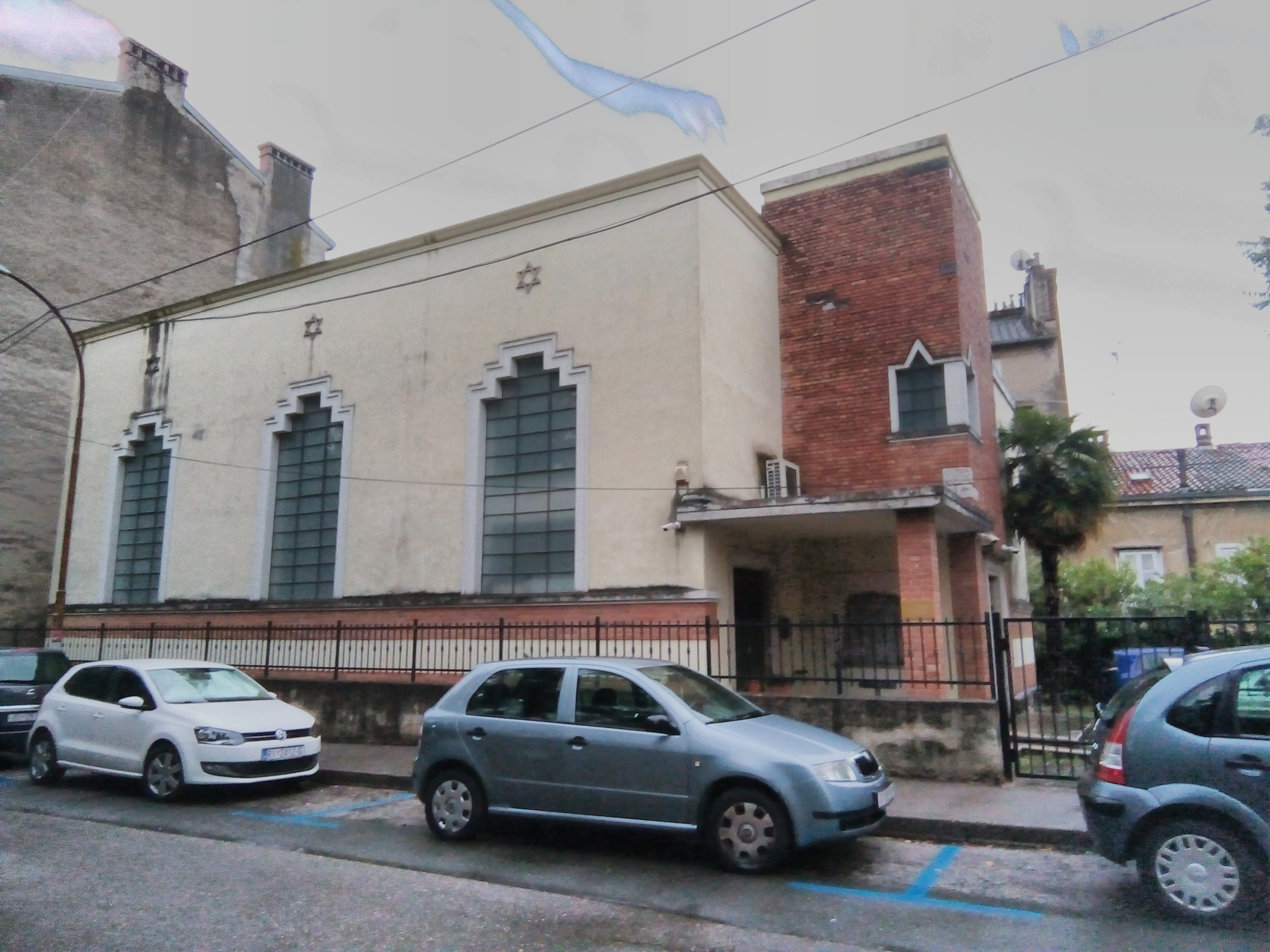
Rijeka Orthodox Synagogue

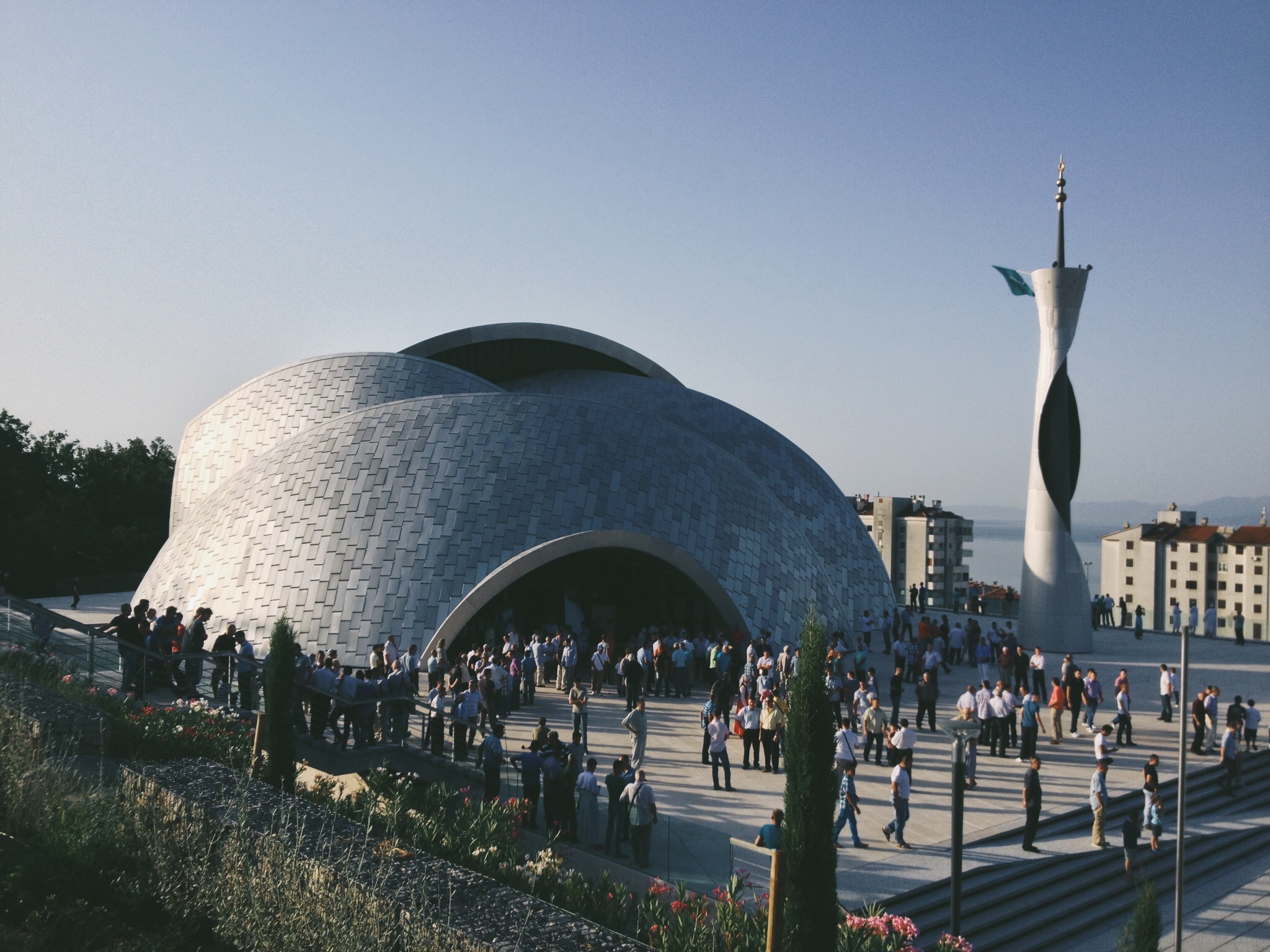
Rijeka Mosque

Religion in Rijeka reflects the city’s long history as a multicultural Adriatic port where several religious communities have coexisted. The majority of residents traditionally belong to the Roman Catholic Church, but the city is also home to Orthodox Christians, Muslims, Jews, and smaller Protestant communities. This diversity is visible in Rijeka’s religious architecture. The Archdiocese of Rijeka is a metropolitan see of the Catholic Church in Croatia, serving as its religious center. The most prominent Catholic building is Rijeka Cathedral, a Baroque church built by Jesuits in the 17th century and dedicated to the city’s patron saint, St. Vitus. The Archbishop is Mate Uzinić. The Catholic Church is the largest religious organization in Rijeka, with over 80% of residents identifying as Catholic. Rijeka is also the episcopal see of the Eparchy of Gornji Karlovac of the Serbian Orthodox Church. In 1717, Rijeka had a Greek Orthodox colony and a Greek chapel. In 1769, Serbs took over the chapel, and in 1788, the cornerstone for Church of St. Nicholas was laid. After 1945, the church community grew rapidly, becoming the strongest in the Diocese.

Other important religious buildings include the Rijeka Orthodox Synagogue, built in 1931 for the Jewish community. The synagogue was not constructed as the main synagogue, as Rijeka already had a large one at the time (Rijeka Synagogue, built in 1903 and destroyed in 1944). In addition to its monument status, it now also serves as a cultural and religious center for the Jewish community. The Rijeka Mosque, opened in 2013, serves as the cultural and religious center for the Muslim community in Rijeka. Together these buildings illustrate the city’s tradition of religious diversity and cultural exchange.

== Climate ==
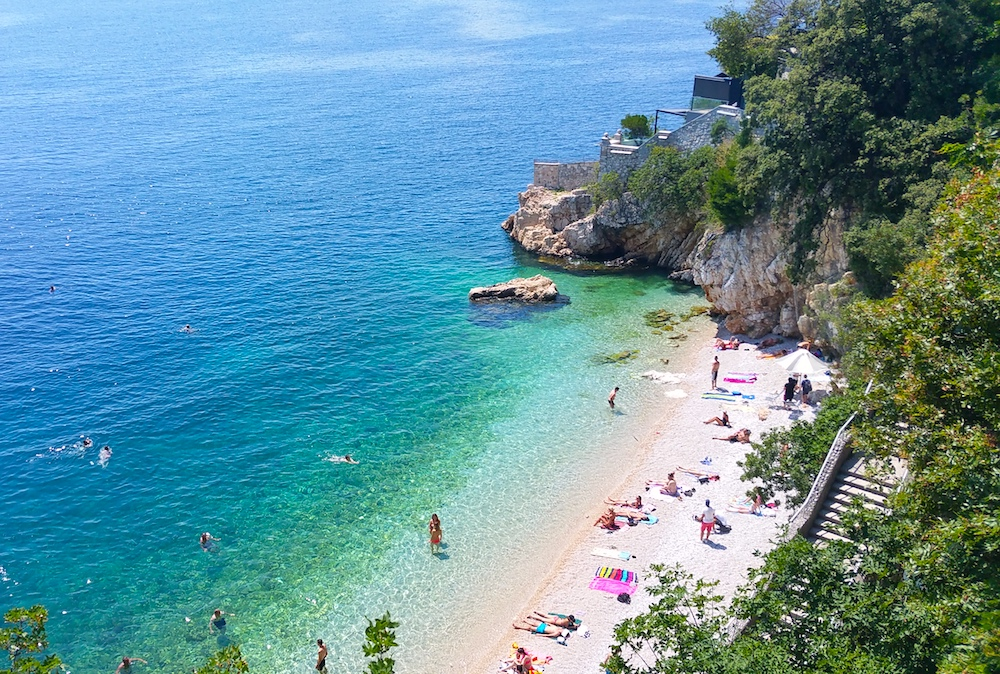
Sablićevo Beach

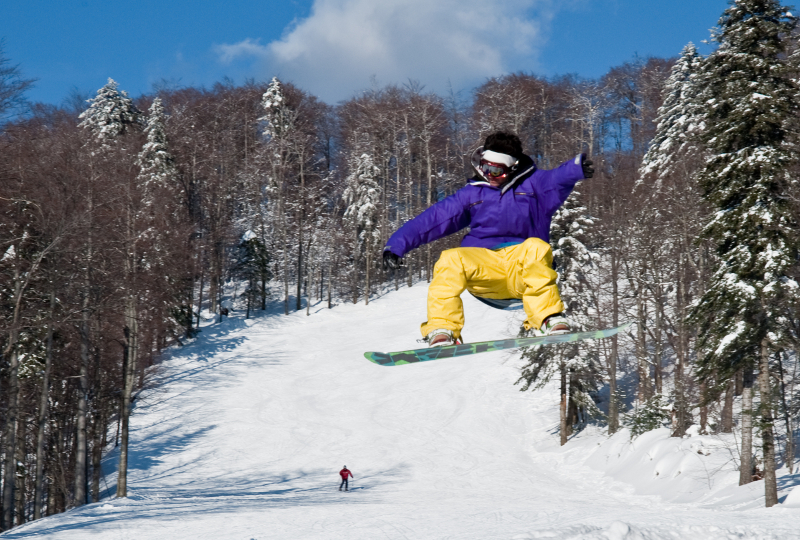
Platak ski resort, north of Rijeka

Rijeka has a humid subtropical climate (Cfa by the Köppen climate classification) with warm summers and relatively mild and rainy winters. The terrain configuration, with mountains rising steeply just a few kilometres inland from the shores of the Adriatic, provides for some striking climatic and landscape contrasts within a small geographic area. Beaches can be enjoyed throughout summer in a typically Mediterranean setting along the coastal areas of the city to the east (Pećine, Kostrena) and west (Kantrida, Preluk). At the same time, the ski resort of Platak, located only about 10 kilometres (6.2 mi) from the city, offers alpine skiing and abundant snow during winter months (at times until early May). The Kvarner Bay and its islands are visible from the ski slopes. Unlike typical mediterranean locations, Rijeka does generally not see a summer drought. Snow is rare (usually three days per year, almost always occurring in patches). There are 20 days a year with a maximum of 30 °C (86 °F) or higher, while on one day a year the temperature does not exceed 0 °C (32 °F). Fog appears in about four days per year, mainly in winter. The climate is also characterized by frequent rainfall. Cold (bora) winds are common in wintertime.

Since records began in 1948, the highest temperature recorded at the local weather station at an elevation of 120 metres (390 ft) was 40.0 °C (104.0 °F), on 19 July 2007. The coldest temperature was −12.8 °C (9.0 °F), on 10 February 1956.

Climate data for Rijeka (1991–2020, extremes 1948–present)
Month	Jan	Feb	Mar	Apr	May	Jun	Jul	Aug	Sep	Oct	Nov	Dec	Year
Record high °C (°F)	20.0 (68.0)	21.4 (70.5)	24.5 (76.1)	29.0 (84.2)	33.7 (92.7)	36.8 (98.2)	40.0 (104.0)	39.5 (103.1)	34.8 (94.6)	29.5 (85.1)	25.5 (77.9)	20.4 (68.7)	40.0 (104.0)
Mean daily maximum °C (°F)	9.4 (48.9)	10.0 (50.0)	13.3 (55.9)	17.8 (64.0)	22.8 (73.0)	26.7 (80.1)	29.4 (84.9)	30.0 (86.0)	23.9 (75.0)	18.9 (66.0)	14.4 (57.9)	10.6 (51.1)	18.9 (66.0)
Daily mean °C (°F)	6.5 (43.7)	6.8 (44.2)	9.9 (49.8)	13.6 (56.5)	18.1 (64.6)	22.0 (71.6)	24.6 (76.3)	24.8 (76.6)	19.7 (67.5)	15.3 (59.5)	11.1 (52.0)	7.5 (45.5)	15.0 (59.0)
Mean daily minimum °C (°F)	3.3 (37.9)	3.3 (37.9)	6.1 (43.0)	9.4 (48.9)	13.3 (55.9)	17.2 (63.0)	19.4 (66.9)	20.0 (68.0)	15.6 (60.1)	11.7 (53.1)	7.8 (46.0)	4.4 (39.9)	11.0 (51.8)
Record low °C (°F)	−11.4 (11.5)	−12.8 (9.0)	−7.7 (18.1)	−2.4 (27.7)	0.3 (32.5)	7.4 (45.3)	10.4 (50.7)	9.1 (48.4)	4.8 (40.6)	−1.2 (29.8)	−4.5 (23.9)	−8.9 (16.0)	−12.8 (9.0)
Average precipitation mm (inches)	124.5 (4.90)	134.6 (5.30)	109.2 (4.30)	104.1 (4.10)	109.2 (4.30)	83.8 (3.30)	66.0 (2.60)	94.0 (3.70)	185.4 (7.30)	205.7 (8.10)	210.8 (8.30)	165.1 (6.50)	1,592.4 (62.69)
Average precipitation days (≥ 1.0 mm)	8	7	7	9	8	8	6	7	9	10	11	9	99
Average snowy days (≥ 1.0 cm)	0.7	0.5	0.2	0.0	0.0	0.0	0.0	0.0	0.0	0.0	0.1	0.4	1.9
Average relative humidity (%)	66	64	63	65	64	61	56	59	64	66	67	67	63.5
Mean monthly sunshine hours	110	130	165	195	250	275	315	300	200	160	100	110	2,310
Mean daily daylight hours	9.2	10.4	12	13.6	14.9	15.6	15.3	14	12.5	10.9	9.5	8.8	12.2
Percentage possible sunshine	41	50	47	47	57	61	71	71	58	51	42	40	55
Average ultraviolet index	1	2	3	5	7	8	8	7	5	3	2	1	4
Source 1: Croatian Meteorological and Hydrological Service
Source 2: Weather Atlas(Daylight-UV)Croatian Meteorological and Hydrological Service (DHMZ)ClimatetoTravel

Climate data for Rijeka
Month	Jan	Feb	Mar	Apr	May	Jun	Jul	Aug	Sep	Oct	Nov	Dec	Year
Average sea temperature °C (°F)	11.4 (52.6)	10.7 (51.2)	11.3 (52.3)	13.7 (56.6)	18.0 (64.3)	22.6 (72.7)	24.8 (76.5)	24.9 (76.8)	23.4 (74.1)	19.5 (67.1)	16.8 (62.2)	14.3 (57.7)	17.6 (63.6)
Source: Weather Atlas

== Demographics ==
Historical population
Year	Pop.	±%
1880	37,904	—
1890	48,959	+29.2%
1900	61,419	+25.4%
1910	76,042	+23.8%
1921	61,157	−19.6%
1931	72,111	+17.9%
1948	67,088	−7.0%
1953	73,718	+9.9%
1961	98,759	+34.0%
1971	129,173	+30.8%
1981	158,226	+22.5%
1991	165,904	+4.9%
2001	144,043	−13.2%
2011	128,624	−10.7%
2021	107,964	−16.1%
Source: Naselja i stanovništvo Republike Hrvatske 1857–2021, DZS, Zagreb

According to the 2021 census, the city proper had a population of 107,964, which included:

Croats	92,075	(85.28%)
Serbs	5,537	(5.13%)
Bosniaks	1,696	(1.57%)
Italians	1,569	(1.45%)

Other groups, including Slovenes and Hungarians, formed less than 1% each. The Croatian census recognized two settlements within the City of Rijeka - the city itself with a population of 128,384, and "Bakar" with a population of 240, which is the village of Sveti Kuzam, separate from the neighboring town of Bakar. On 27 February 2014, Rijeka city council passed a decision to annex the settlement (named "Bakar-dio (Sv. Kuzam")) to the settlement of Rijeka.

City of Rijeka: Population trends 1857–2021
v

population	18597	23880	27904	38959	51419	66042	61157	72111	67088	73718	98759	129173	158226	165904	144043	128624	107964
	1857	1869	1880	1890	1900	1910	1921	1931	1948	1953	1961	1971	1981	1991	2001	2011	2021

Sources: Croatian Bureau of Statistics publications

There are 34 units of local administration called mjesni odbor in Rijeka:

- Banderovo
- Belveder
- Brajda-Dolac
- Brašćine-Pulac
- Bulevard
- Centar-Sušak
- Draga
- Drenova
- Gornja Vežica
- Gornji Zamet
- Grad Trsat
- Grbci
- Kantrida
- Kozala
- Krimeja
- Luka
- Mlaka
- Orehovica
- Pašac
- Pećine
- Pehlin
- Podmurvice
- Podvežica
- Potok
- Srdoči
- Sveti Kuzam
- Sveti Nikola
- Svilno
- Školjić-Stari grad
- Škurinje
- Škurinjska Draga
- Turnić
- Vojak
- Zamet

In 1911 the linguistic division of the city of Rijeka (excluding Sušak) was:

Total inhabitants (in 1911)	49,608	%
Italians	23,283	46.9%
Croats	15,731	31.7%
Slovenians	3,937	7.9%
Hungarians	3,619	7.3%
Germans	2,476	5.0%
English	202	0.4%
Czechs	183	0.3%
Serbs	70	0.14%
French	40	0.08%
Poles	36	0.07%
Romanians	29	0.06%

The number of Italians in Rijeka decreased drastically following the Istrian-Dalmatian exodus, which occurred from 1943 to 1960.

Boundaries of Rijeka are sometimes extended into the adjoining areas. The former municipality of Rijeka (20th century) consists of other towns and municipalities outside Rijeka city proper, which used to be part of an official union of adjacent settlements (disbanded in 1995). It includes towns and municipalities of Kastav, Viškovo, Klana, Kostrena, Čavle, Jelenje, Bakar and Kraljevica.

The urban agglomeration of Rijeka includes the former municipality along with the towns and municipalities of Opatija, Lovran, Mošćenička Draga and Matulji.

The metro area of Rijeka is the territory of consolidated expansion. It includes towns and municipalities of Crikvenica, Novi Vinodolski, Vinodolska, Lokve, Fužine, Delnice and Omišalj, which all gravitate towards the City of Rijeka.

The following tables list the city's population, along with the population of ex-municipality (disbanded in 1995), the urban and the metropolitan area.

Year	City proper	Ex-municipality	Urban	Metro
1981	158,226	193,044	222,318	251,768
1991	165,904	206,229	236,028	268,016
2001	144,043	191,647	220,538	252,933
2011	128,624	185,125	213,666	245,054
2021	107,964	165,008	191,293	219,325

	Population	Area (km^{2})	Density
City proper	107,964	44	2,469
Ex-municipality	56,386	473	119
Subtotal	165,008	517	319
Urban agglomeration	26,285	308	85
Subtotal	191,293	825	232
Metro area	28,032	840	33
Total	219,325	1,665	132

== Architecture of Rijeka ==
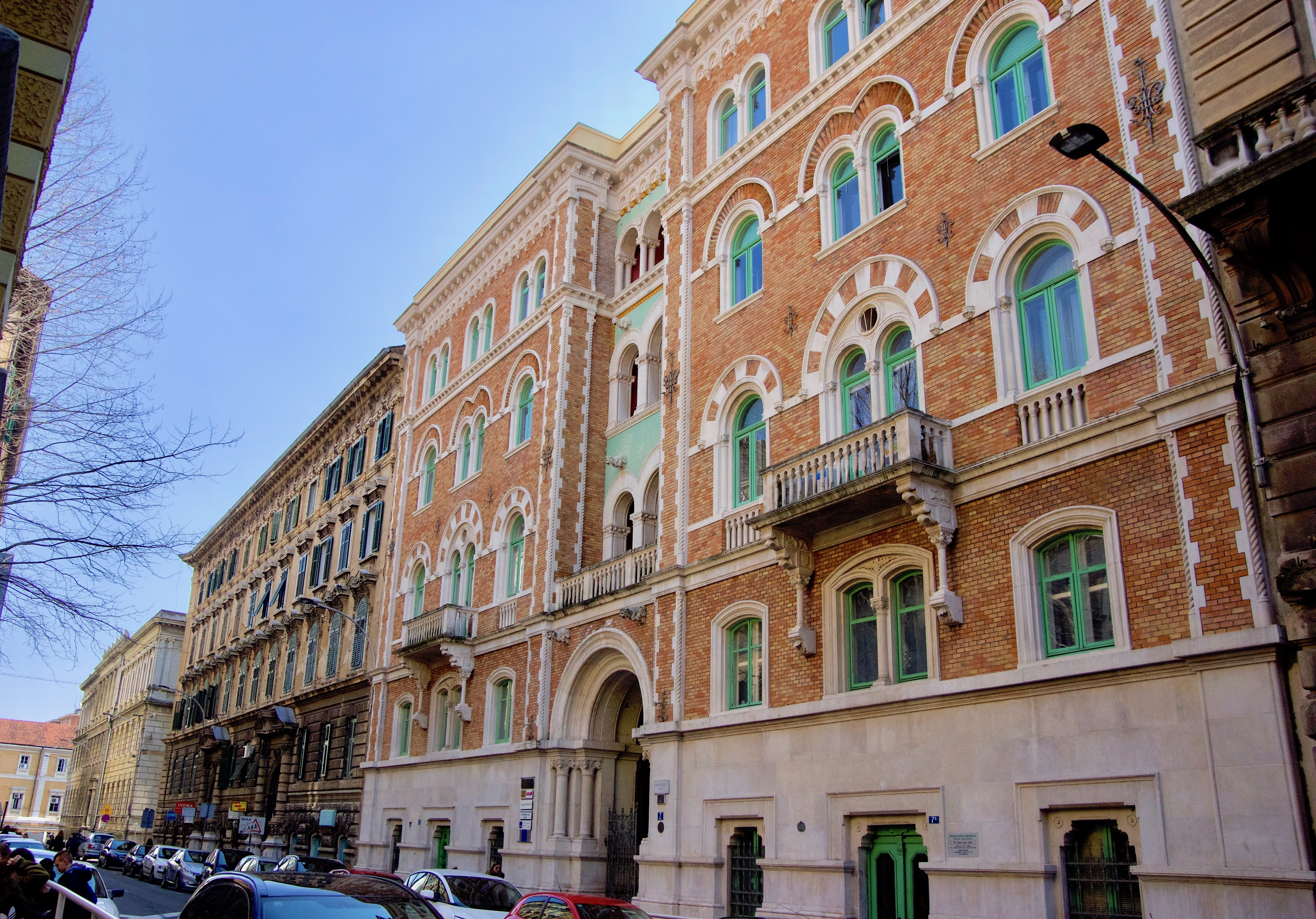
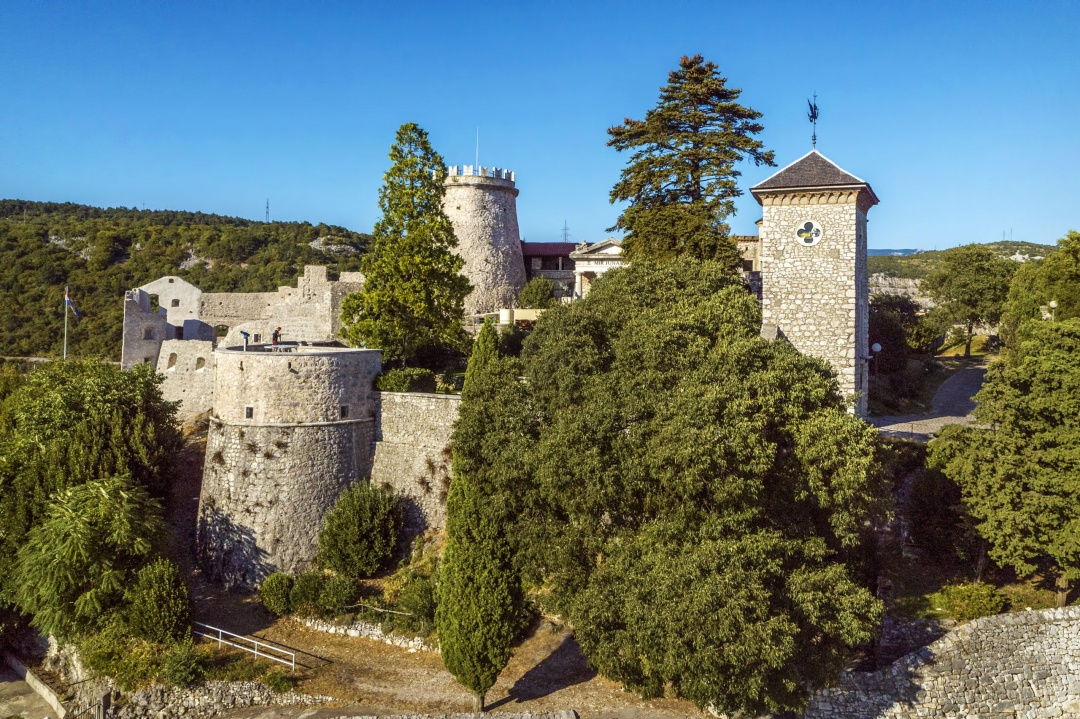
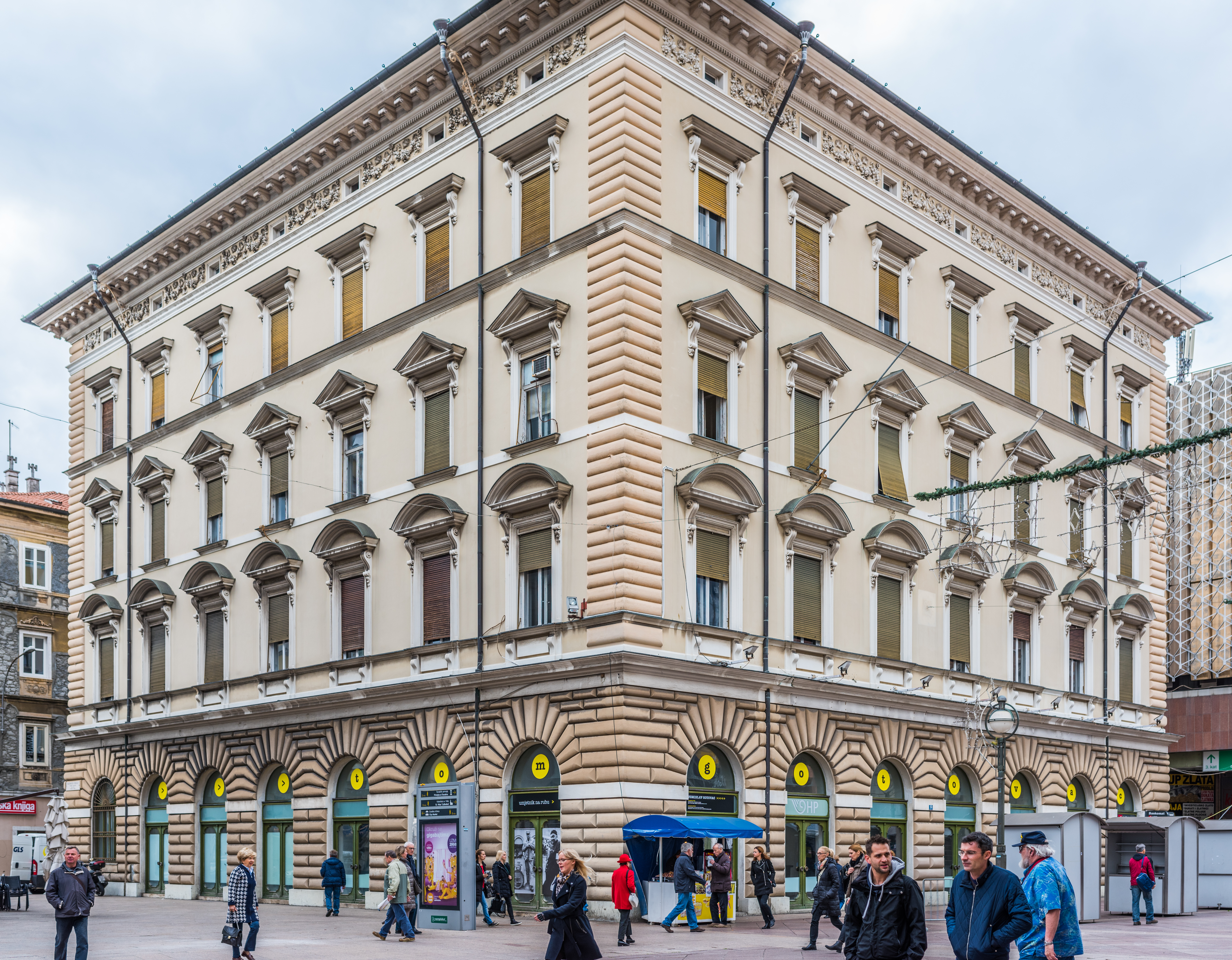
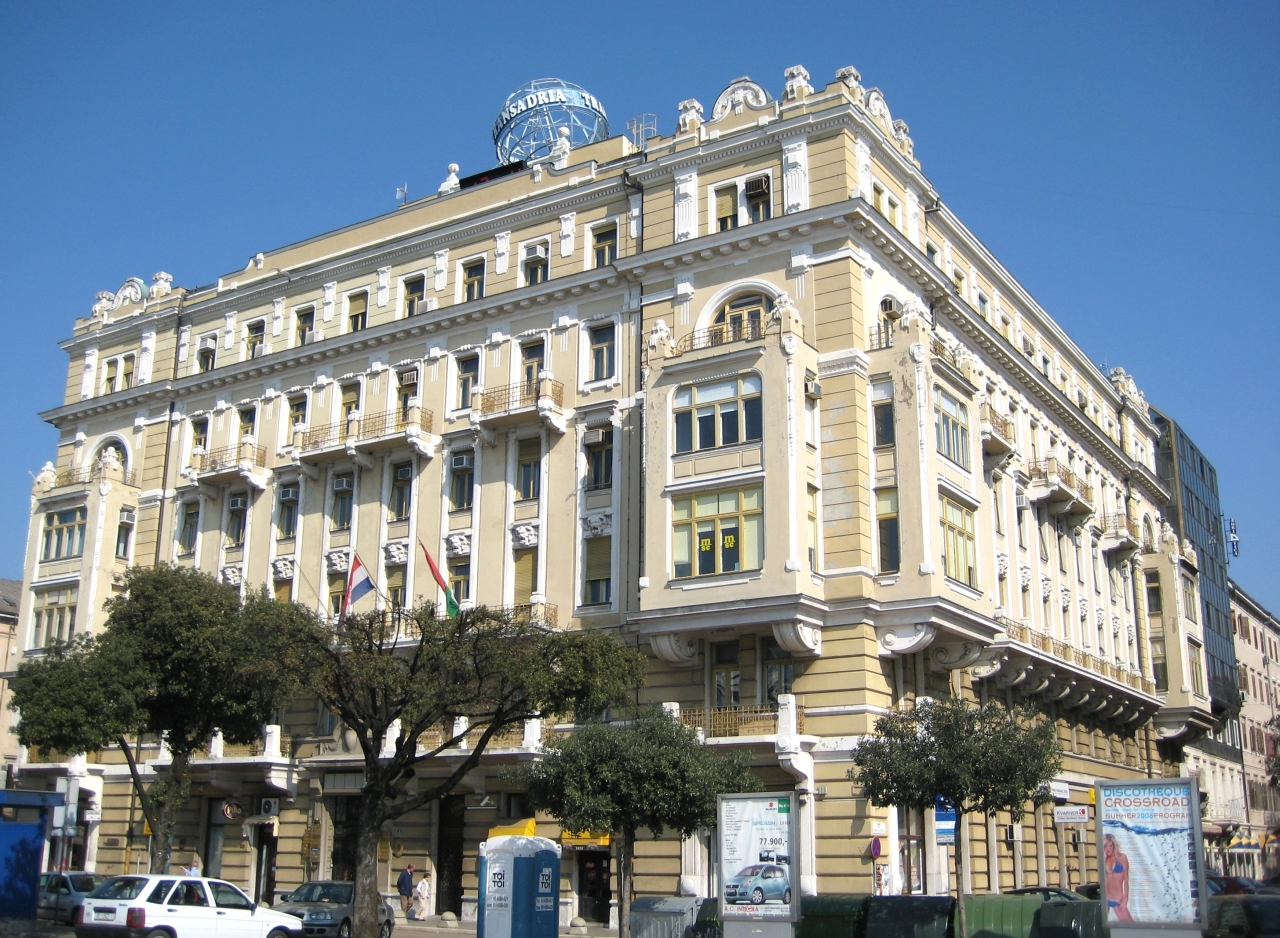
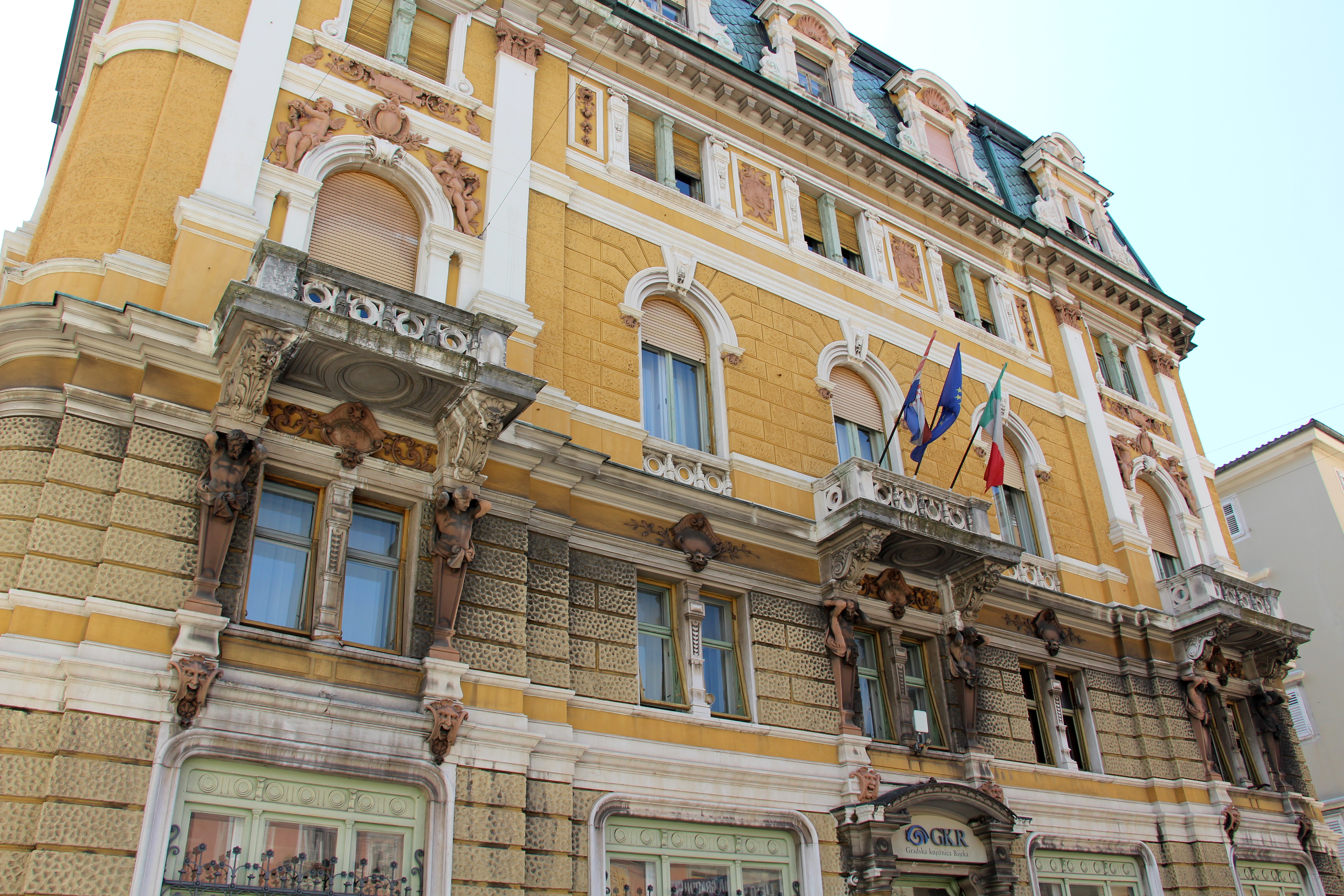
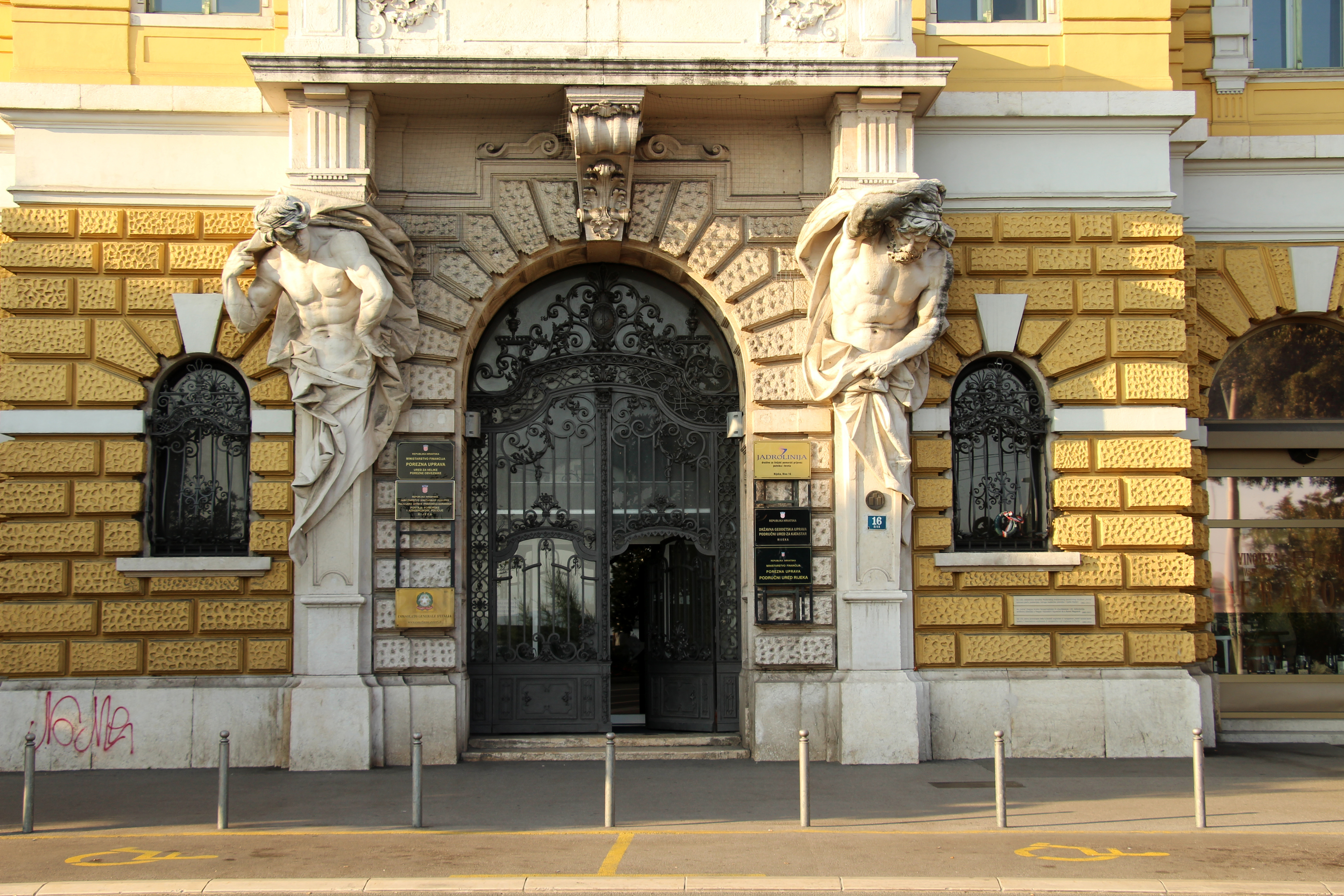
Clockwise, from upper left: Casa Veneziana Palace, Trsat Castle, Main Post Building, Transadria Palace, Palace Modello, Jadrolinija building entrance.

After the Austro-Hungarian Compromise of 1869, and the Croatian-Hungarian Compromise of 1869, the city of Rijeka came under the administration of the central Hungarian government as a separate political body - Corpus Separatum. The Hungarians sought to turn the temporary political situation into a permanent one and achieve their goal - the creation of a Hungarian littoral (Magyar tenger) with Rijeka as its capital. Architecture in Rijeka was heavily influenced by the architecture of Vienna and Budapest, where the Art Nouveau expression began to take shape in the late 1890s. The Hungarians wanted to build their only seaport like other important cities in the Austro-Hungarian Monarchy, especially like the competing Austrian port - Trieste. In 1873, the then mayor Giovanni Ciotte announced a public competition for the urban expansion of the city and his entire campaign was to turn Rijeka into a European metropolis. The construction of Rijeka took place intensively on three levels, and so they began to build the Hungarian Royal State Railway and the railway connecting Budapest with the Adriatic Sea. They also built numerous administrations, office and residential buildings, and shipyards.

At the end of the 19th century, Rijeka became an international center for port and railway traffic due to its rapid industrialization. Such extensive construction of all types of architecture gave rise to the development of historicism in Rijeka, and today Rijeka's architecture represents the history of Austro-Hungarian influence. Facade decorations are most often borrowed from the repertoire of the Renaissance and Baroque for companies that want a luxurious facade and want to emphasize their economic power. The first locations of business palaces in the city were built on the Korzo, the Palace of the Maritime Governor (today's Port of Rijeka administration), the Palace of the Adria Shipping Company (today's county building on the Riva), the Governor's Palace, the Palace of the Hungarian Customs Administration (today's Brodokomerc). This type of Rijeka architecture includes multi-storey palaces built for office and business purposes, the Main Post Office Palace, the Rijeka Municipal Savings Bank Palace (built in 1883, today's Palace Modello), the Royal Railway Palace, the Governor's Palace (built in 1892, today's Maritime and Historical Museum of the Croatian coast), the Pension Fund Palace (built in 1894, a business and residential building), and the Adria Palace of the Hungarian Shipbuilding Society (built in 1894, today's headquarters of Jadrolinija).

=== Monuments and sights ===
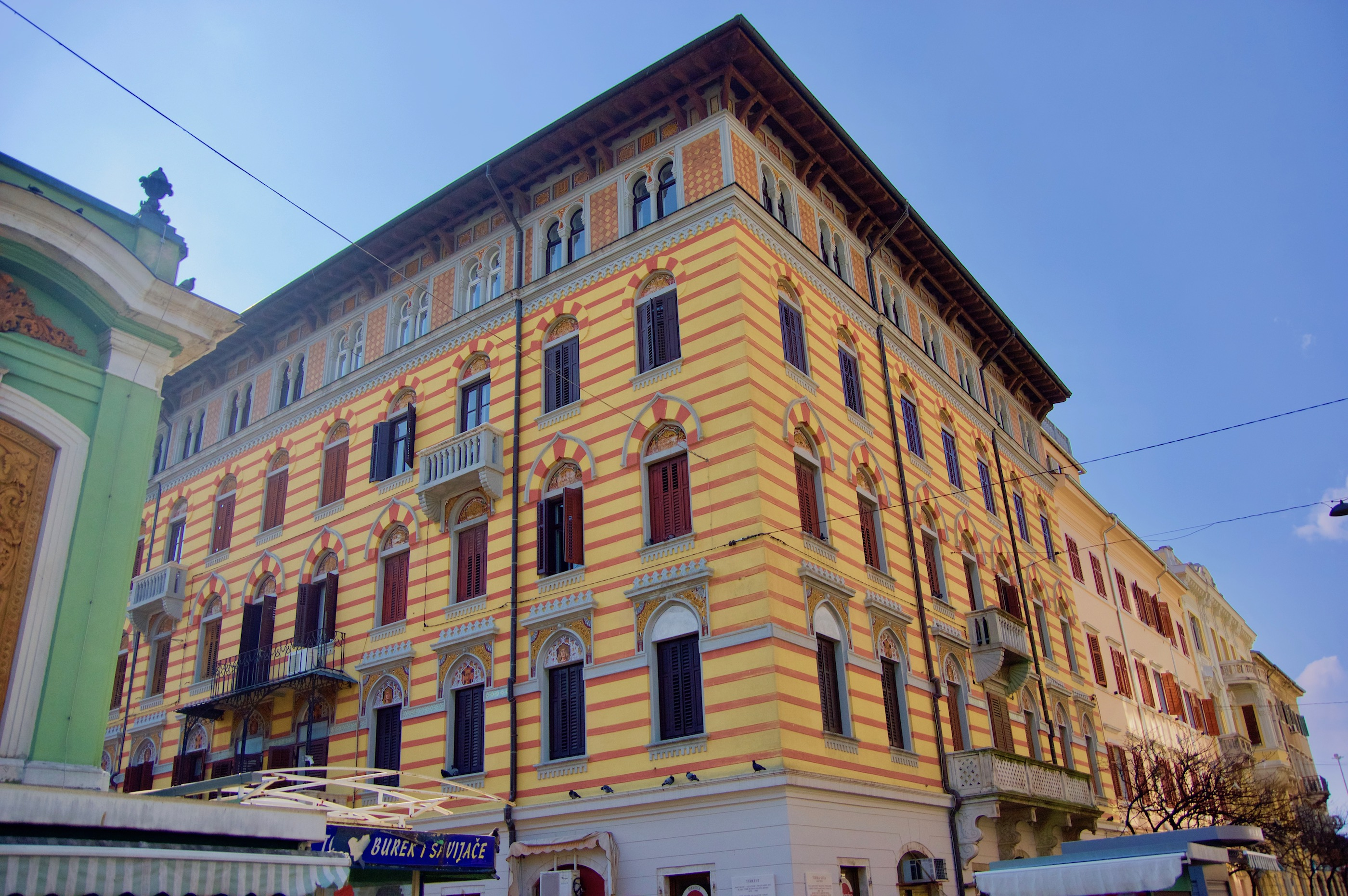
Turkish house

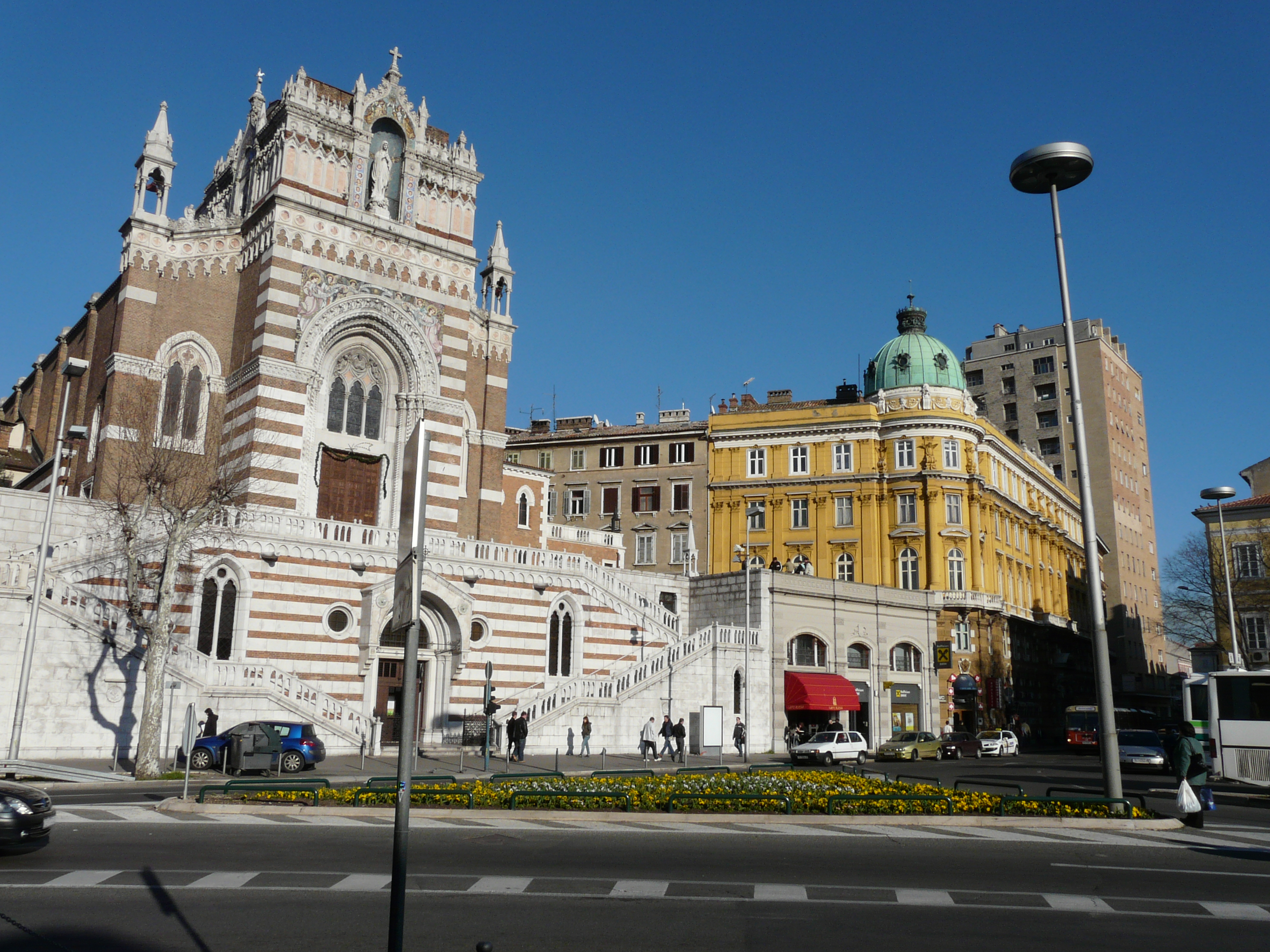
Capuchin church of Lady of Lourdes with Palace Ploech

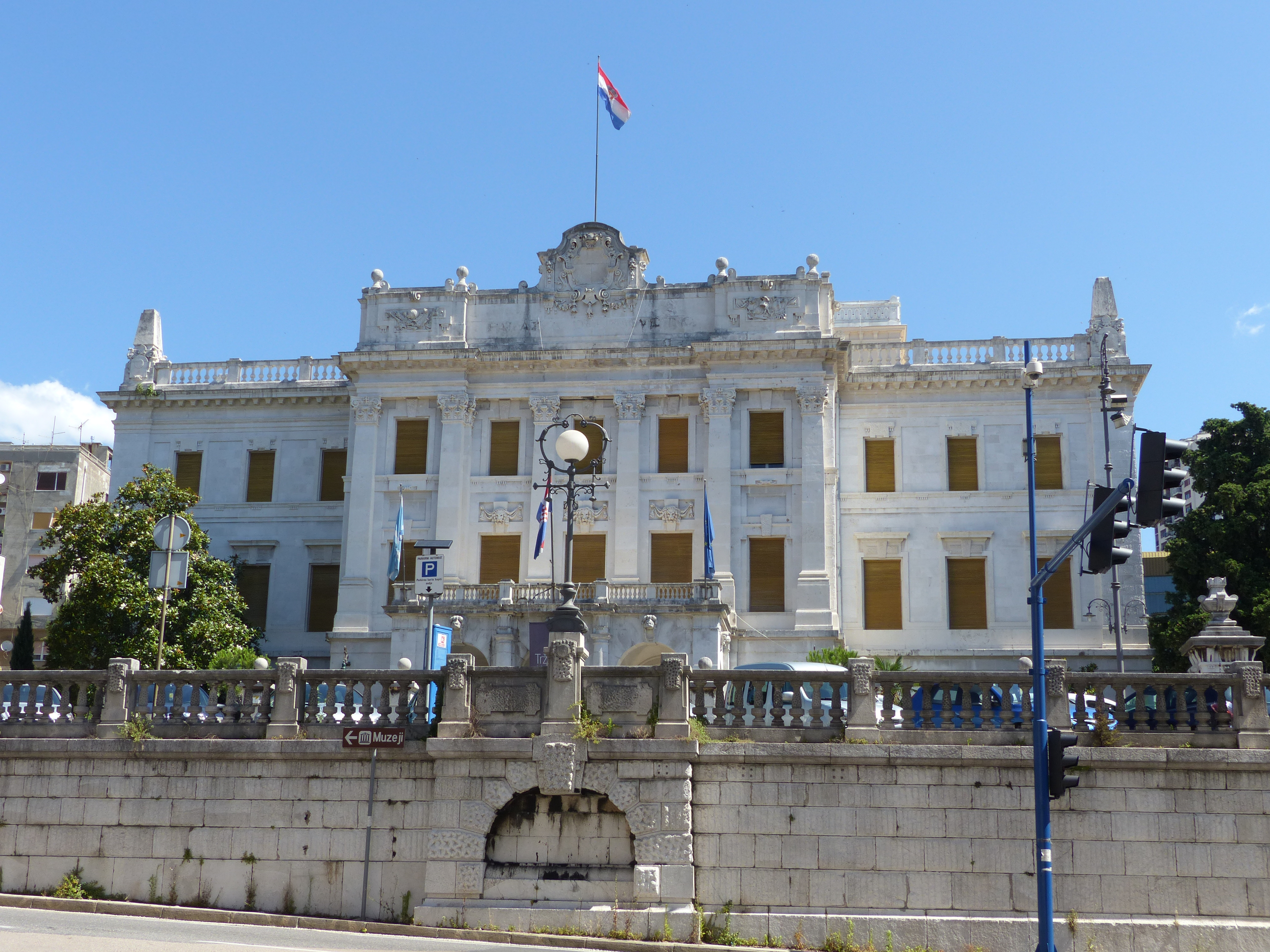
Governor's Palace

The Croatian National Theatre Ivan Zajc is located on a park-like square. The building by architects Fellner and Helmer preserves a long theatrical tradition. Officially opened in October 1885, the grand theatre building includes work by the famous Venetian sculptor August Benvenuti and ceiling artist Franz Matsch, who collaborated with Ernst and Gustav Klimt, who painted the interior.

Among the residential buildings, there is a building called the Turkish House (Casa turca), built in the neo-Moorish style for Nikolaides, the Turkish diplomatic representative in Spain, and then the consul in Rijeka from 1898.

Tvornica "Torpedo" (the Torpedo factory). The first European prototypes of a self-propelled torpedo, created by Giovanni Luppis, a retired naval engineer from Rijeka. The remains of this factory still exist, including a well-preserved launch ramp used for testing self-propelled torpedoes on which in 1866 the first torpedo was tested.

Old gate or Roman arch. At first it was thought that this was a Roman Triumphal Arch built by the Roman Emperor Claudius Gothicus but later it was discovered to be just a portal to the pretorium, the army command in late antiquity.

Rijeka Cathedral, the cathedral of the Rijeka Archdiocese. It was built as a monastery church of the Rijeka Jesuits, on the site of a demolished church dedicated to the patron saint of Rijeka, Saint Vitus.

Stadion Kantrida, was included on CNN's list of the world's most iconic and unusual football stadiums in 2011.

Art installation "Masters", a site-specific art installation by Czech artist Pavel Mrkus was permanently placed beneath the high ceiling vault on the inner balconies of Rijeka's fish market. The installation consists of a video segment - a projection of Mrkus's video recorded on the DIMI fishing trawler while fishing in the Kvarnerić waters – and it is accompanied by an audio segment of the sounds of the sea and a fishing boat that can only be heard in the fish market gallery. It is a story that pays homage to those who are never seen here, but without whom there would be no fish on the tables.

Art installation "Balthazartown Beach", a site-specific art installation found its place on the Grčevo beach, more commonly known as Pajol or Šestica, located at the very end of Pećine near the Viktor Lenac Shipyard. Under the mentorship of artist Igor Eškinja, students of the Academy of Applied Arts of the University of Rijeka designed a steel sculpture that changes the observer's experience of the environment and they created 15 inscriptions on a concrete plateau that encourage everyone to play and are visible only when in contact with water. The artistic process is inspired by the theme of Professor Balthazar, the world-famous and award-winning animated series, in which the scenographer used Rijeka as the primary inspiration in the creation of Balthazartown Beach.

Riječki neboder, (Palazzo Arbori) is the oldest skyscraper in Rijeka, named after the war Riječki to distinguish it from its contemporary counterpart in Sušak. It is located on Jadranski trg in the city center. The Arbori Palace, or the Rijeka Skyscraper, has become one of the recognizable symbols of Rijeka, and with its spatial organization and the design of its simple but monumental brick facade, it is considered one of the most significant works of modern architecture in today's Croatia.

=== Trsat ===
Svetište Majke Božje Trsatske – the Sanctuary of Our Lady of Trsat. Built 135 m (443 ft) above sea level on the Trsat hill during the late Middle Ages, it represents the Guardian of Travellers, especially seamen, who bring offerings to her so she will guard them or help them in time of trouble or illness. It is home to the Gothic sculpture of the Madonna of Slunj and to works by the Baroque painter C. Tasce. Trsat Castle, a 13th-century fortress, which offers magnificent vistas from its bastions and ramparts, looking down the Rječina river valley to the docks and the Kvarner Gulf. Petar Kružić staircase (or Trsat stairway), which links downtown Rijeka to Trsat. The stairway consists of 561 stone steps and was built for the pilgrims as the way to reach the Sanctuary of Our Lady of Trsat.

== Transport ==
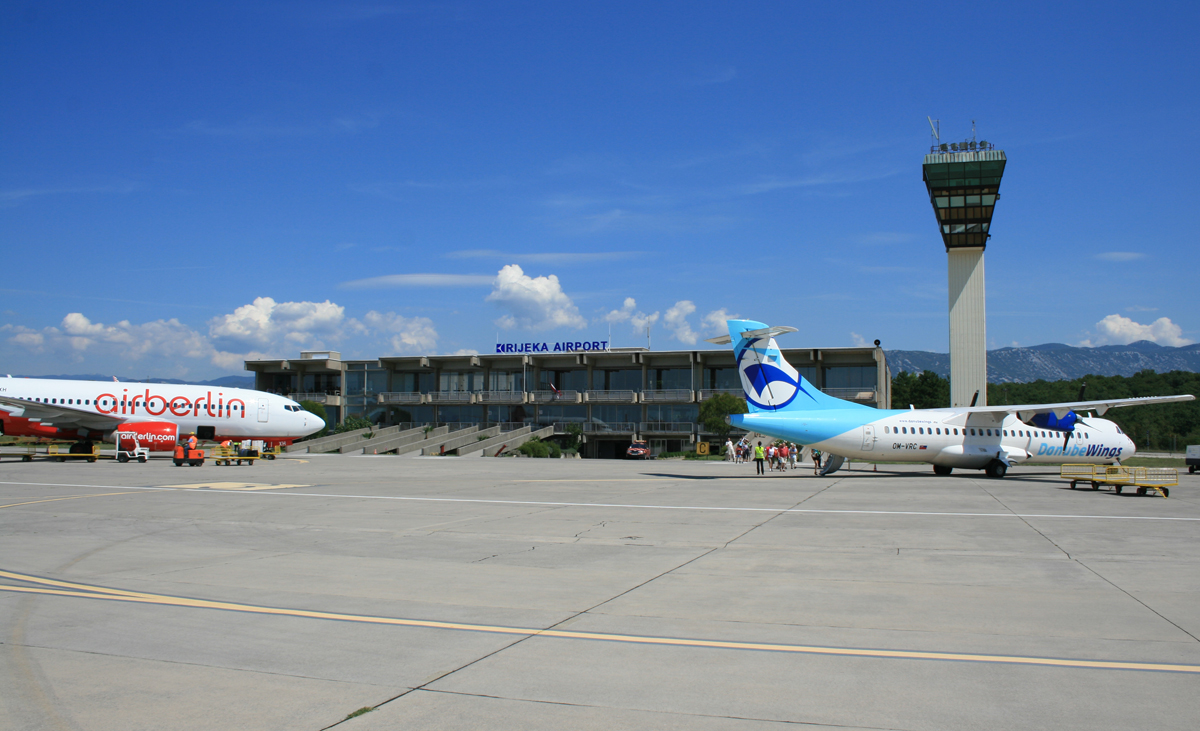
Rijeka international Airport

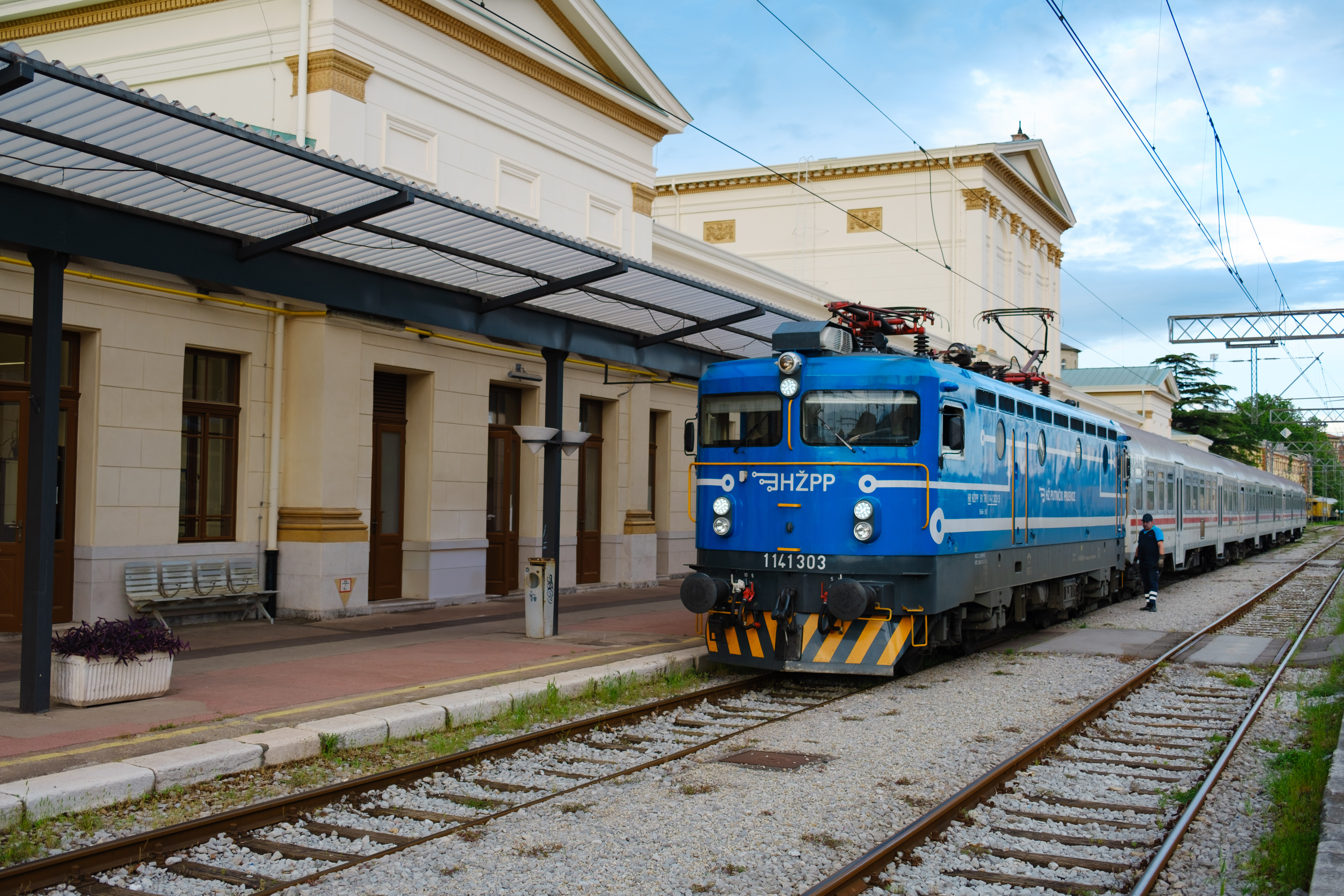
Rijeka Railway Station

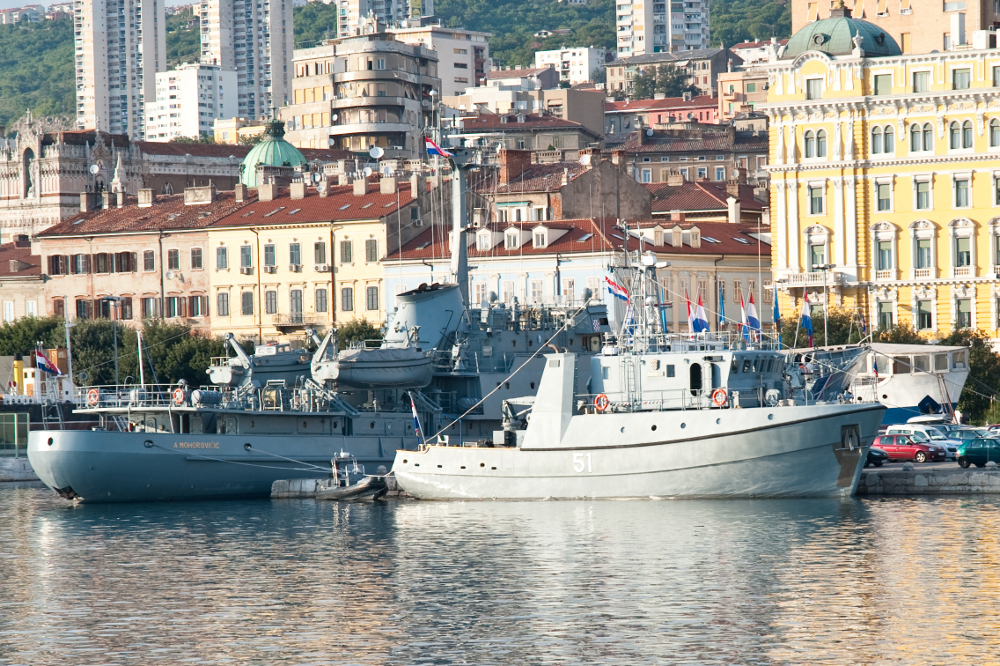
Ships in Rijeka harbour

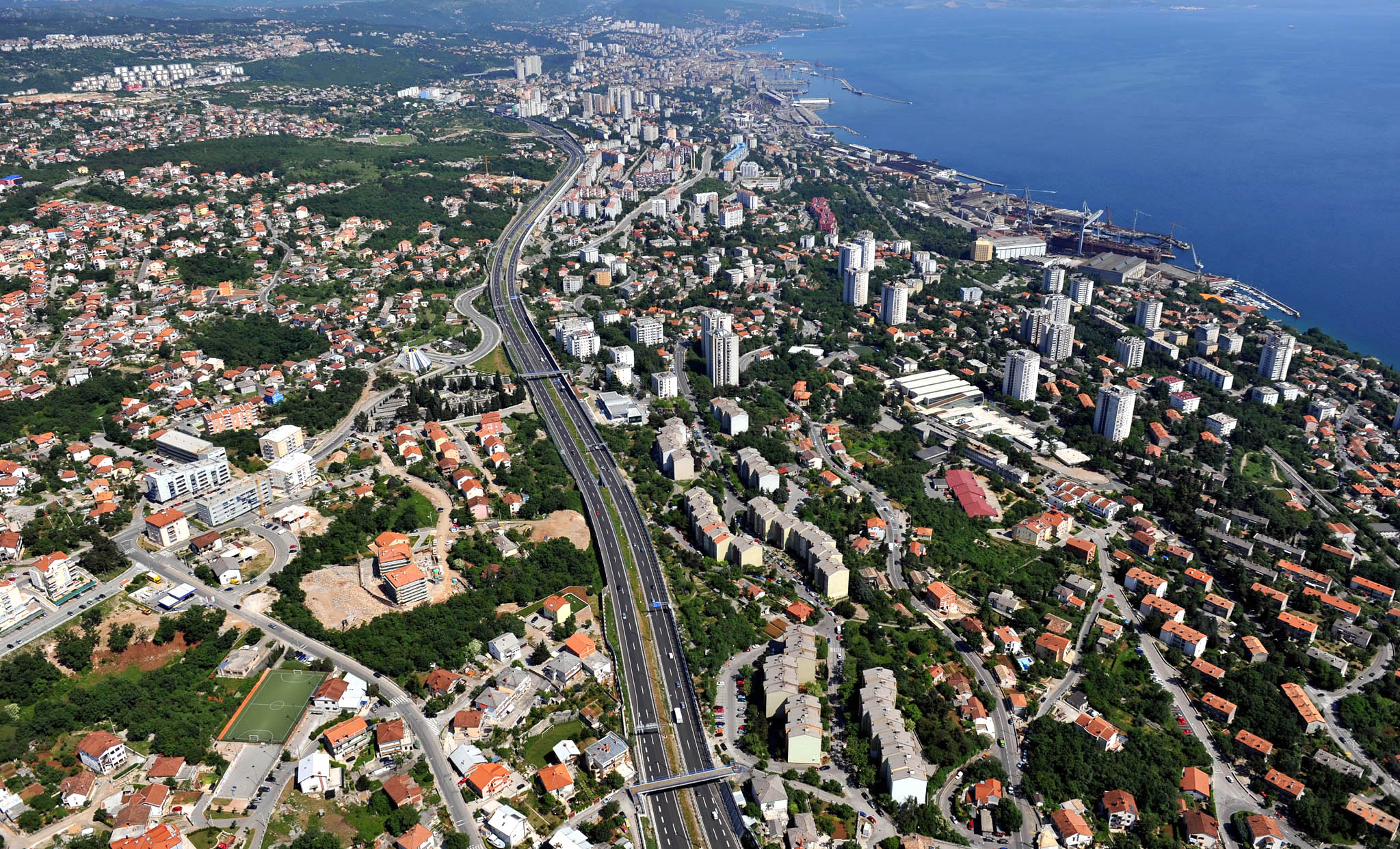
A7 Highway in Rijeka

The Port of Rijeka is the largest port in Croatia, with a cargo throughput in 2017 of 12.6 million tonnes, mostly crude oil and refined petroleum products, general cargo and bulk cargo, and 260,337 twenty-foot equivalent units (TEUs). The port is managed by the Port of Rijeka Authority. The first record of a port in Rijeka date back to 1281, and in 1719, the Port of Rijeka was granted a charter as a free port. There are ferry connections between Rijeka and the surrounding islands and cities, but no direct international passenger ship connections. There are coastal lines to Split and onward to Dubrovnik, which operate twice weekly and have international connections.

The city is difficult to get to by air outside of the tourist season. The city's own international airport, Rijeka Airport is located on the nearby island of Krk across the Krk Bridge. Buses, with a journey time of approximately 45 minutes, operate from Rijeka city center and nearby Opatija, with a schedule based on the planned arrival and departure times of flights. Handling 200,841 passengers in 2019, the facility is more of a charter airport than a serious transport hub, although various scheduled airlines have begun to service it with a comparatively large number of flights coming from airports in Germany. Most of these flights only operate during the tourist season between approximately May and October. Alternative nearby airports include Pula (around 90 minutes drive from Rijeka), Trieste (around 90 minutes), Ljubljana (around 2 hours), Zagreb (around 2 hours) and Venice (around 3 hours).

Rijeka has efficient road connections to other parts of Croatia and neighbouring countries. The A6 motorway connects Rijeka to Zagreb via the A1, while the A7 motorway, completed in 2004, links Rijeka with Ljubljana, Slovenia, via Ilirska Bistrica and with Trieste, Italy. The A7 acts as the Rijeka bypass motorway and facilitates access to the A8 motorway of the Istrian Y network starting with the Učka Tunnel, and linking Rijeka with Istria. As of August 2011, the bypass is being extended eastwards to the Krk Bridge area and new feeder roads are under construction.

Rijeka is integrated into the Croatian railway network and international rail lines. A fully electrified railway connects Rijeka to Zagreb and beyond towards Koprivnica and the Hungarian border as part of Pan-European corridor Vb. Rijeka is also connected to Trieste and Ljubljana by a separate electrified railway line that extends northwards from the city. Rijeka has direct connections by daily/night trains to Prague, München, Salzburg, Ljubljana, Bratislava and Brno. Construction of a new high performance railway between Rijeka and Zagreb, extending to Budapest is planned, as well as rail links connecting Rijeka to the island of Krk and between Rijeka and Pula.

=== Bus connections ===
Rijeka Bus Station is connected by regular bus lines with all major Croatian cities such as Zagreb, Osijek, Slavonski Brod, Đakovo, Nova Gradiška, Požega, Vukovar, Gospić, Karlovac, Zadar, Šibenik, Split, Makarska and Dubrovnik. Departures are frequent in the direction of Istria, the islands of Cres, Lošinj, Krk, Rab and Pag and the towns around Crikvenica, Novi Vinodolski and Senj. From international lines, there are regular departures in the direction of Germany, Switzerland, Italy, Bosnia and Herzegovina and Serbia.

KD Autotrolej d.o.o. is a carrier of passengers in the area of the City of Rijeka and cities / towns in the suburbs (the so-called Rijeka ring).

== Sports ==
The history of Rijeka's organised sports started between 1885 and 1888 with the foundation of the Club Alpino Fiumano in 1885, the Young American Cycle Club in 1887 (the first club of this American league to be founded in a foreign land), and the Nautico Sport Club Quarnero in 1888 by the Hungarian minority of the city. Even earlier, in 1873, following an initiative by the English industrialist Robert Whitehead, the first football match to be disputed in today's Republic of Croatia territory was played in Rijeka: the Hungarian Railways team and the English engineers-led team of the Stabilimento Tecnico di Fiume (later Torpedo Factory of Fiume). The first football club in Fiume was founded under the name of Fiumei Atletikai Club.

Today, HNK Rijeka is the city's main football team, which competes in the Croatian Football League. HNK Rijeka were Croatian champions in 2016–17 and 2024–25, as well as 7 times Croatian Football Cup winners and 2 times Yugoslav Cup winners. Until July 2015, HNK Rijeka was based at the iconic Stadion Kantrida. With Kantrida awaiting reconstruction, they are based at the newly built Stadion Rujevica, their temporary home in the club's new training camp. Additionally, HNK Orijent is based in Sušak and plays in the First Football League (second tier).

Rijeka's other notable sports clubs include RK Zamet and ŽRK Zamet (handball), VK Primorje EB (water polo), KK Kvarner (basketball) and ŽOK Rijeka (women's volleyball).

Between 1969 and 1990, Rijeka hosted the Yugoslav motorcycle Grand Prix that was part of the Grand Prix motorcycle racing. Rijeka also hosted the 2008 European Short Course Swimming Championships. In over 80 years, LEN had never seen so many records as the number set at Bazeni Kantrida (Kantrida Swimming Complex). A total of 14 European records were set, of which 10 were world records, and even 7 were world-best times. This championship also presented a record in the number of participating countries. There were more than 600 top athletes from some 50 European countries. Swimmers from 21 nations won medals, and 40 of the 51 national member Federations of LEN were present in Rijeka.

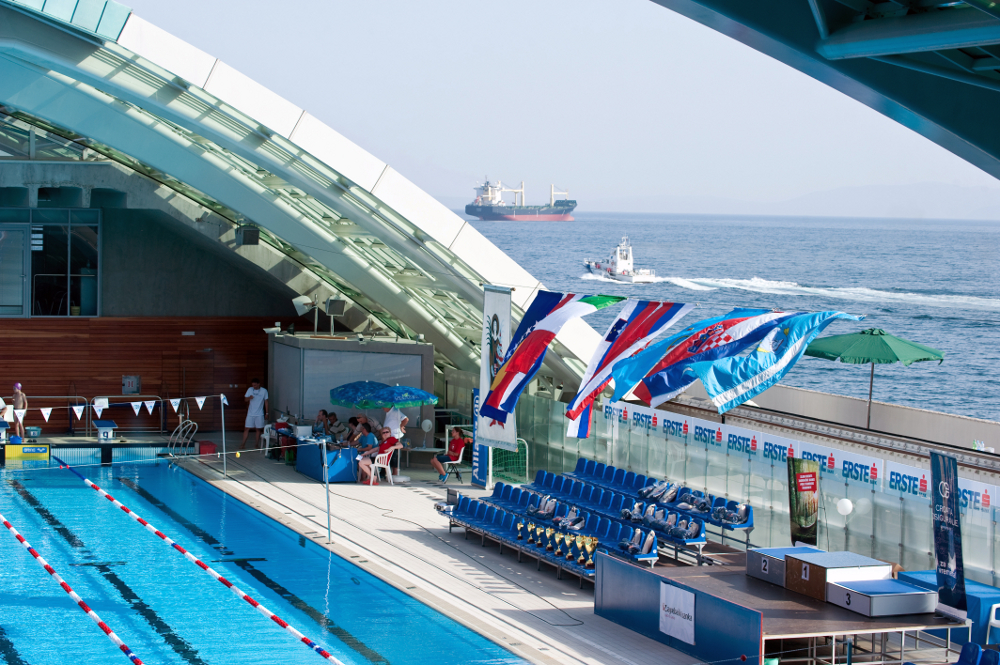
Bazeni Kantrida, site of the 2008 European Short Course Swimming Championships

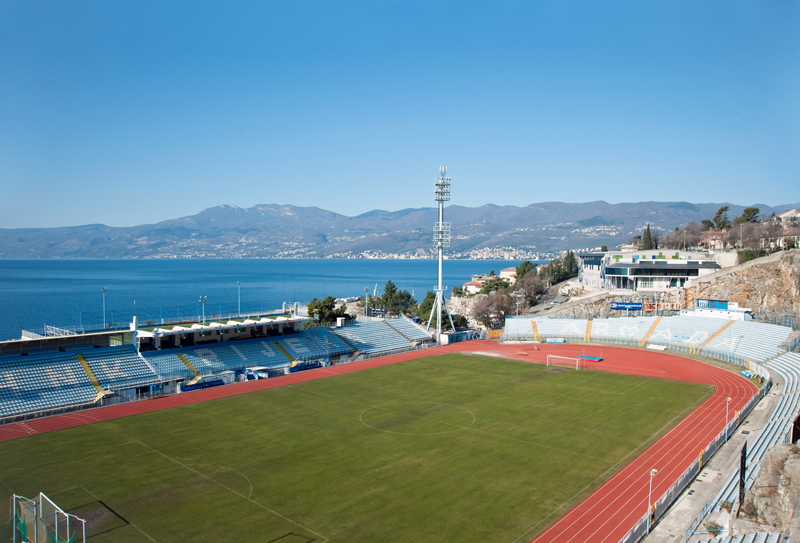
Stadion Kantrida

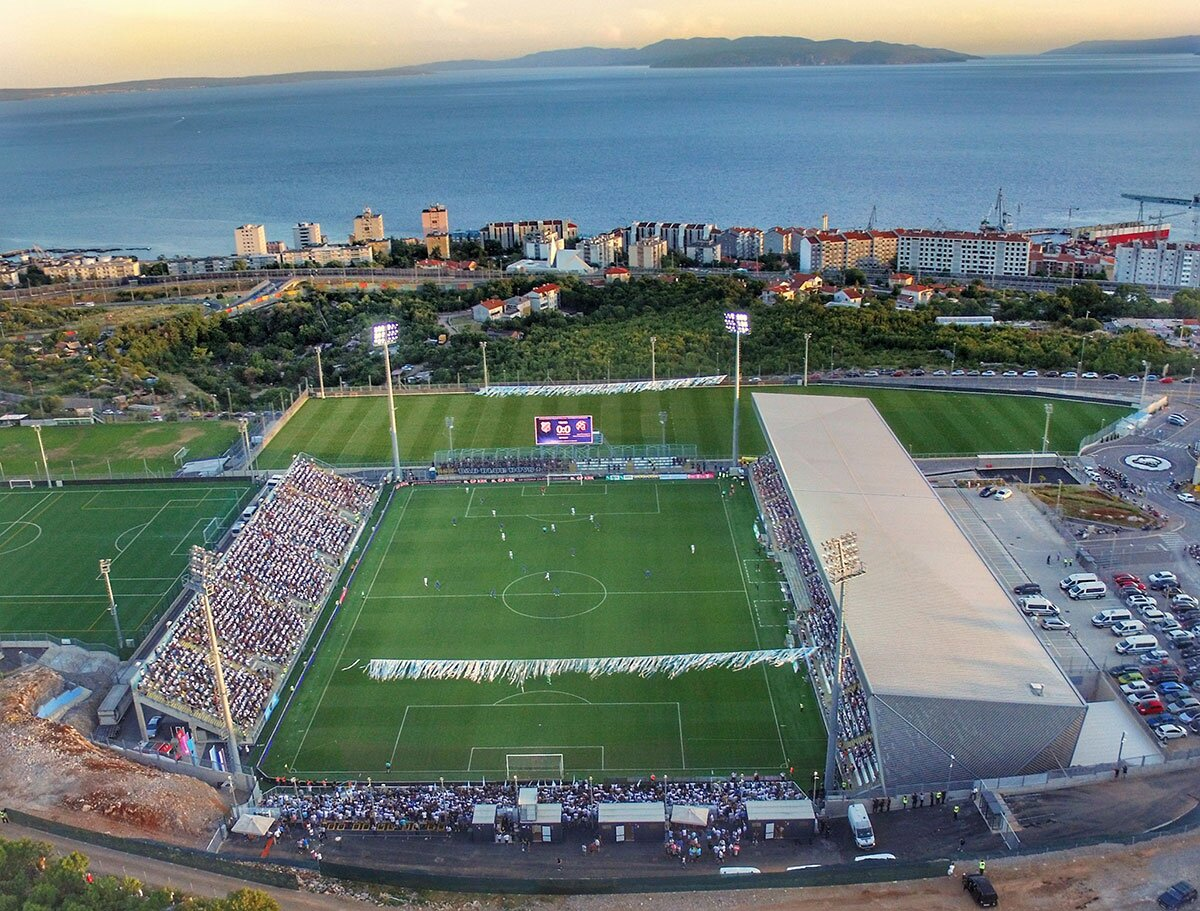
Stadion Rujevica

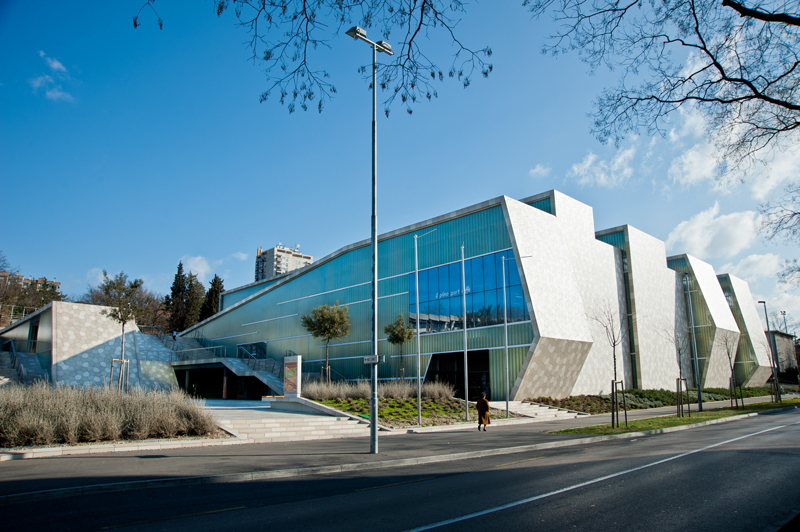
Centar Zamet

== Education ==
The University of Rijeka is the main institution of higher education in the city. It was formally founded in 1973 but with roots dating back to 1632 and the local Jesuit School of Theology.

The secondary education in the city includes a variety of schools, including:

- First Rijeka Croatian Gymnasium
- Andrija Mohorovičić Gymnasium
- First Sušak Croatian Gymnasium

== International relations ==
=== Twin towns – sister cities ===
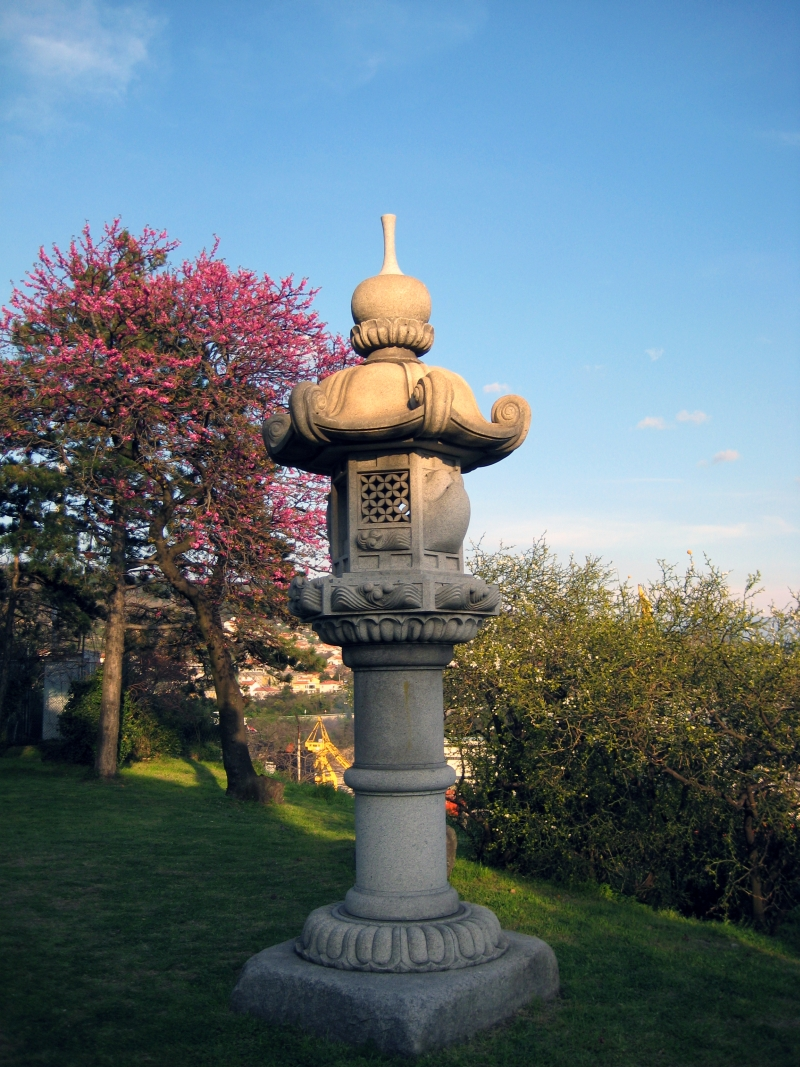
Lantern, a gift from the Japanese city Kawasaki to the Rijeka

Rijeka is twinned with:

Ljubljana, Slovenia; Cetinje, Montenegro; Bitola, North Macedonia; Csepel, Hungary; Burgas, Bulgaria; Novi Sad, Serbia	Faenza, Italy; Este, Italy; Genoa, Italy; Imola, Italy; Trieste, Italy; Rome, Italy	Rostock, Germany; Neuss, Germany; Hamburg, Germany; Karlsruhe, Germany	Kawasaki, Japan; Yalta, Ukraine; Qingdao, China; Dalian, China; Ningbo, China

== Panoramas ==
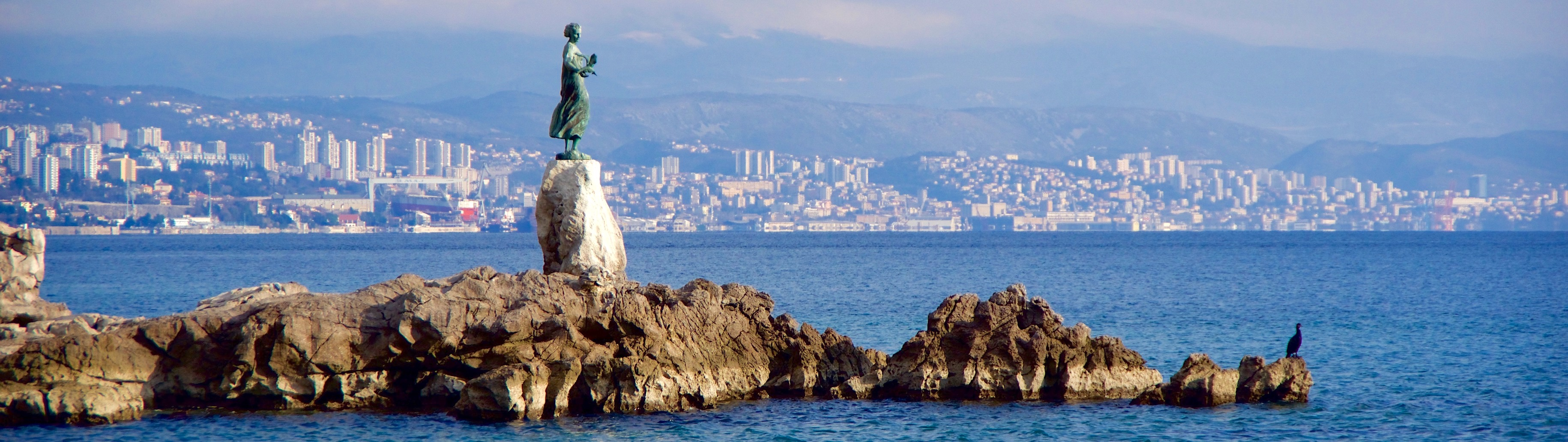
View of Rijeka harbor from Opatija
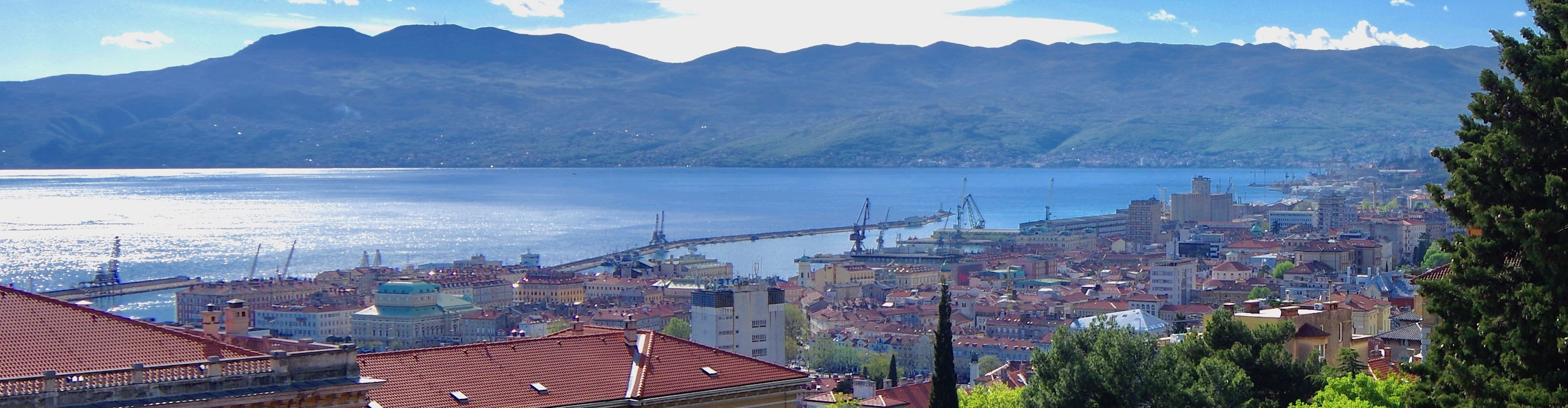
View of Rijeka and Učka
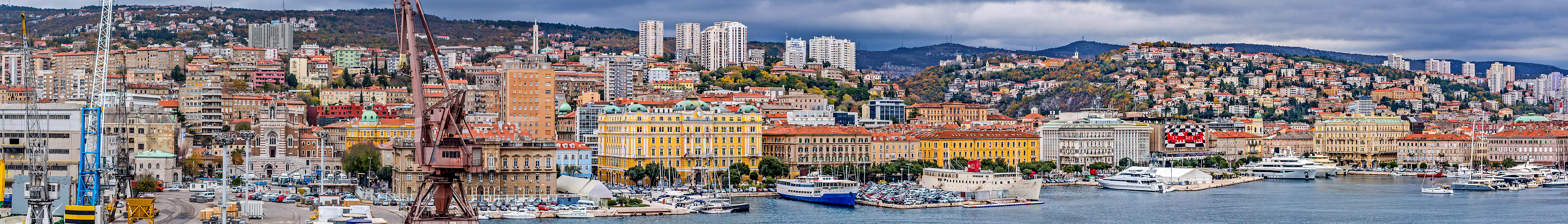
Panoramic view from Rijeka's Riva waterfront.

== Notable people ==
=== Scientists, professors and inventors ===
- Archduke Joseph Karl of Austria, Archduke of the Austro-Hungarian Empire, Romani language philologist and Romani ethnographer, member of the Hungarian Academy of Sciences
- Robert Bartini, Fiuman-Soviet aircraft designer and scientist, creator of the Bartini A-57 and Bartini Beriev VVA-14
- Mihaly Csikszentmihalyi, Hungarian-American Psychology professor at Claremont Graduate University, known as the architect of the notion of flow
- Umberto D'Ancona, Fiuman-Italian Biology Professor and founder of the Hydro-biological Station in Chioggia
- Antonio Grossich, Fiuman-Italian doctor, professor of surgery and inventor of the Tincture of iodine, senator and irredentist politician
- William Klinger, historian of Fiuman, Croatian and Yugoslav history
- Giovanni Luppis, Fiuman officer of the Austro-Hungarian Navy, lead inventor of the first self-propelled torpedo
- Paul Neményi, Fiuman-Hungarian mathematician and physicist, and the probable father of former World Chess Champion Bobby Fischer
- Peter Salcher, Fiuman-Austrian physicist of the Fiume Academy, pioneer of ultrafast photography and aerodynamic studies

=== Arts and culture ===
- Oretta Fiume, Fiuman-Italian cinema star of the 1930s and 1940s, with her final role in Fellini's La Dolce Vita
- Irma Gramatica, Fiuman-Italian stage and film actress
- Janko Polić Kamov, Croatian writer and poet from Sušak
- Marija Krucifiksa Kozulić, Catholic nun, founder of the order of the Sisters of the Sacred Heart of Jesus
- Aldo Lado, Italian film director
- Geronimo Meynier, Fiuman-Italian teen film actor
- Osvaldo Ramous, Fiuman poet and writer that signed the town's 20th-century literature and cultural life
- Romolo Venucci, Fiuman-Italian cubist painter and sculptor
- Ödön von Horváth, Austro-Hungarian playwright, author of the play Geschichten aus dem Wiener Wald, winner of the Kleist Prize in 1931
- Heinrich von Littrow, Czech and Austrian poet, writer and cartographer
- Leo von Littrow, Fiuman Impressionist artist, a major exponent of the artistic movement in Southern Europe

=== Politics and institutions ===
- Mario Blasich, Fiuman politician and physician, victim of the Fiume Autonomists purge of 1945.
- Giovanni de Ciotta, Fiuman-Italian entrepreneur and politician
- Kolinda Grabar-Kitarović, Croatia's 4th and first female president from 2015 to 2020
- János Kádár, Chairman of the Central Committee of the Hungarian Communist Party, served for more than 30 years as the leader of Hungary
- Michele Maylender, Fiuman politician during the Hungarian Crown's dependency, founder of the Autonomist Party of Fiume
- Andrea Ossoinack, businessman and politician, among the founders of the Free State of Fiume and founder of the Autonomist League of Fiume
- Giovanni Palatucci, last Italian superintendent of Fiume and Righteous Among The Nations
- Leo Valiani, Fiuman-Italian historian, politician and journalist, a prominent dissident during the Italian fascist regime
- Miklós Vásárhelyi, Fiuman-Hungarian dissident and writer, famous for his decades-long fight against the Hungarian communist party headed by János Kádár
- Nino Host Venturi, Fiuman-Italian fascist leader, politician and historian
- Alexander von Hoyos, Fiuman-Hungarian diplomat who played a major role during the July Crisis while serving as chef de cabinet of the Foreign Minister at the outbreak of World War I in 1914
- Sebő Vukovics (Sava Vuković), Hungarian Minister of Justice in 1849 during the Hungarian Revolution of 1848
- Riccardo Zanella, Fiuman politician, first and only elected president of the Free State of Fiume

=== Economists and entrepreneurs ===
- Andrija Ljudevit Adamić, Aristocratic trader from Fiume, builder, and one of the most prominent supporters of the economical and cultural development of the city
- Luigi Ossoinack, serial entrepreneur and businessman, was one of the main drivers of Fiume's economic boom during the second half of the 19th century
- Robert Whitehead, English serial entrepreneur, known for developing the first effective self-propelled torpedo, in collaboration with Giovanni Luppis in Fiume

=== Sportspeople ===
- Ivana Dojkić, Croatian basketball player, 2024 WNBA champion.
- Mirza Džomba, Croatian handball player, world champion and Olympic champion
- Iva Grbas, Croatian professional basketball player.
- Ezio Loik, Italian footballer, member of the Grande Torino team which won 5 consecutive Serie A titles in the 1940s and the Italian national team.
- Abdon Pamich, Fiuman-Italian race walker, gold medalist at the 1964 Tokyo Summer Olympics.
- Nora Tausz Rónai, Brazilian holocaust survivor, architect, writer and masters swimmer; born in Fiume.
- Ulderico Sergo, Fiuman-Italian professional boxer, gold medalist at the 1936 Summer Olympics in Berlin.
- Orlando Sirola, Fiuman-Italian tennis player.
- Luciano Sušanj, Fiuman-Croatian politician, European athletic champion.
- Mario Varglien, Italian footballer, Juventus player with record appearances and world champion in 1934
- Oscarre Vicich, footballer.
- Rodolfo Volk, footballer and member of the AS Roma Hall of Fame.
- Stefano Vukov, tennis coach known for coaching Wimbledon champion Elena Rybakina.
- Ida Štimac, Croatian alpine skier who competed in 2018 Winter Olympics.

=== Musicians ===
- Dino Ciani, Fiuman-Italian pianist
- Damir Urban, Croatian musician and singer-songwriter, former member of the band Laufer
- Ivan Zajc, Fiuman-Croatian composer, conductor, director and teacher
- Marko Purišić, Music Artist, achieved 2nd place in the Eurovision Song Contest in 2024 and known as Baby Lasagna

=== Others ===
- Nina Benedikta Krapić, religious sister who is Vice Director of the Holy See Press Office since 2026.
- Agathe Whitehead, Fiuman-born English heiress and mother of the Trapp Family singers
- Hedviga Golik, a former nurse whose death story was picked up by several media outlets around the world.

== In popular culture ==
The German western Winnetou movies from the 1960s, based on Karl May novels, were in part filmed on location in the outskirts of Rijeka.

The setting of the 1970s cartoon series Professor Balthazar was inspired by Rijeka.

The 1980s American TV series The Winds of War was in part filmed in Rijeka and the surrounding areas.

A stylised version of Fiume during the 1920s was one of the main settings in the 1992 movie Porco Rosso by world acclaimed Japanese director Hayao Miyazaki, as the town in front of which the fantastical "Hotel Adriano" is found and to which it is connected by a boat service taken by the protagonist.

Bruce Sterling's November 2016 novel, written in collaboration with Warren Ellis, Pirate Utopia, a dieselpunk alternative history, is set in Fiume (now Rijeka) in 1920 during the short-lived Italian Regency of Carnaro.

The TV series Novine (The Paper), which has been streaming on Netflix since April 2018, is based in Rijeka and the city was used as the main filming location.

In 2019 the movie The Hitman's Wife's Bodyguard with was in part filmed in Rijeka.

Recently Rijeka - with its historic industrial sites, unusual hilly setting, sweeping views and retro architecture - has become a popular location for the filming of TV-advertisements. Examples include advertisements for the Belgian internet provider Telenet, Japanese tire manufacturer Bridgestone, German retail chain DM, Japanese Honda Civic Type R cars, Ukrainian seafood restaurant chain Flagman, Slovenian soft drink brand Cockta, German car manufacturer Mercedes and others.

== See also ==
- Čavle
- Charter of Carnaro was the constitution of the Italian Regency of Carnaro, a short-lived government in Fiume (Rijeka)
- Crikvenica
- Drenova, Rijeka
- Fiume (disambiguation)
- Geography of Croatia
- Ilario Carposio
- Kastav
- Kostrena
- Kvarner Gulf
- List of governors and heads of state of Fiume
- Primorje-Gorski Kotar County
- Robert Whitehead
- Rječina
- Sušak
- Trsat
- Fužine
