= Hreljin Castle =

Fortress near Hreljin, Croatia

Hreljin
- Hreljin; Croatia
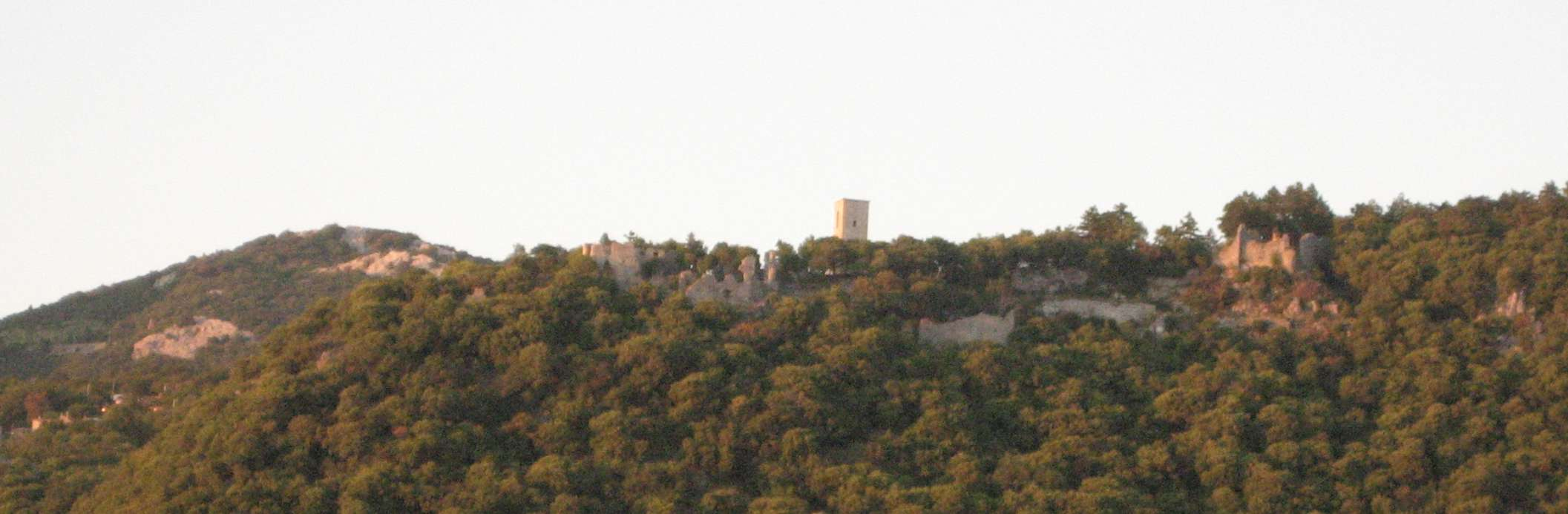

- Castle plan

Site information
- Type: Castle
- Open to the public: Yes
- Condition: Ruins

Location
- Coordinates: 45.274°N 14.602°E

Site history
- Built: by 1225
- Materials: Limestone

Hreljin Castle (Croatian: Gradina Hreljin) is a fortress and castle near Hreljin, Croatia. It is located in the western part of Vinodol, in the hill above Bakarac, which served as its seaport. Hreljin is first mentioned in historical sources in 1225, when the Frankopan noblemen received it as a gift from the Croatian-Hungarian king Andrew II. It is one of the nine towns that signed the Vinodol Codex, one of the oldest Slavic codes, in 1288. After the Frankopans, it was owned by another noblemen family, the Zrinskis, from 1550 until the execution of Zrinskis and Frankopans in 1671. When Bakar was declared a Royal free city in 1778, Hreljin was under its rule, but already decaying. The last inhabitants were three priests who abandoned it in 1790.

The old town of Hreljin was surrounded by defensive walls, which had two towers and two gates. The castle, probably the oldest part of the fortified settlement, was at the highest point of the hill, facing the Bakar Bay. A single-nave church of St. George was in the center of the settlement and had a bell tower attached to it. Next to the ruins of the church stands the Chapel of the Blessed Virgin Mary, dedicated in 1701.

== Gallery ==
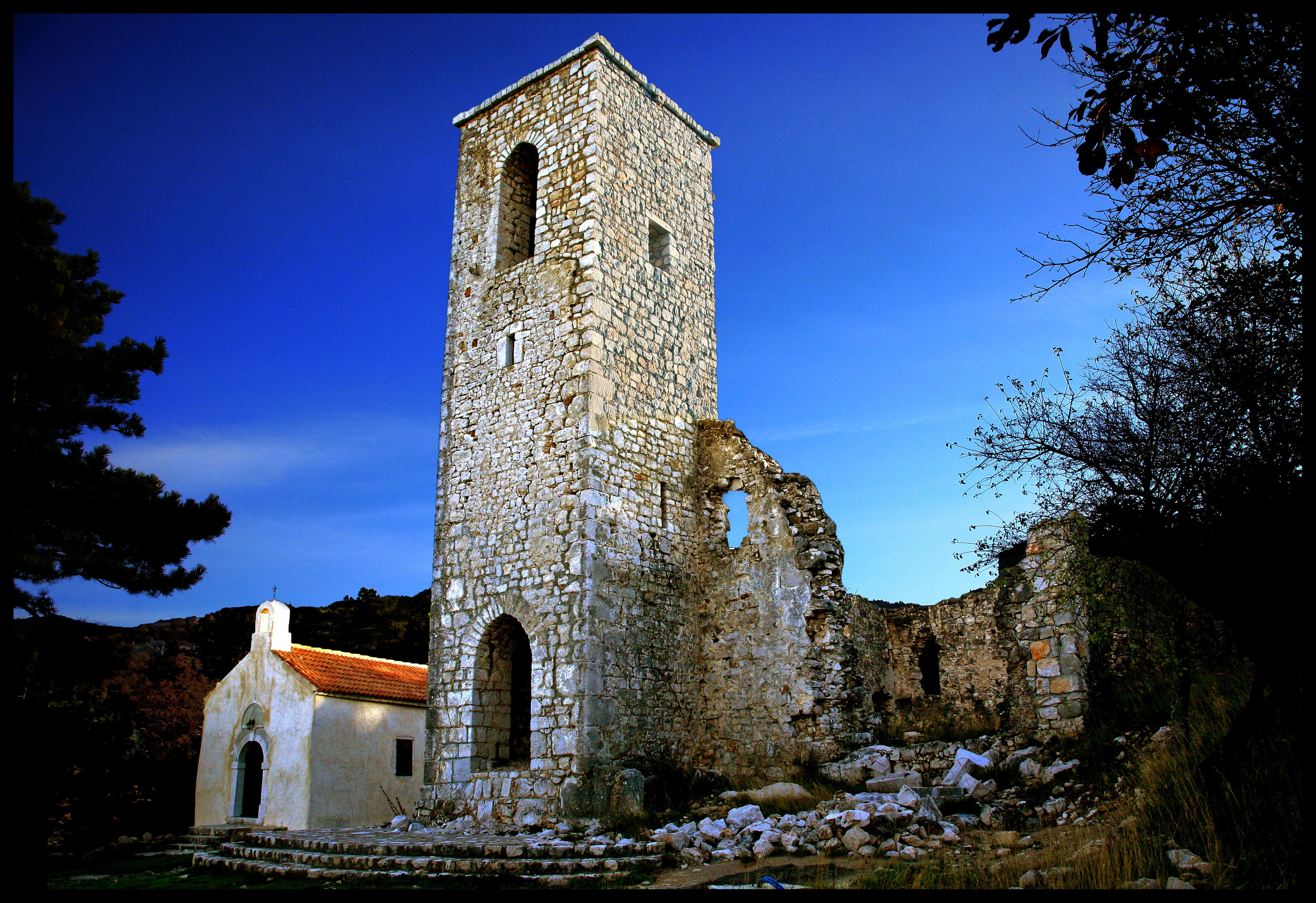
Chapel with tower

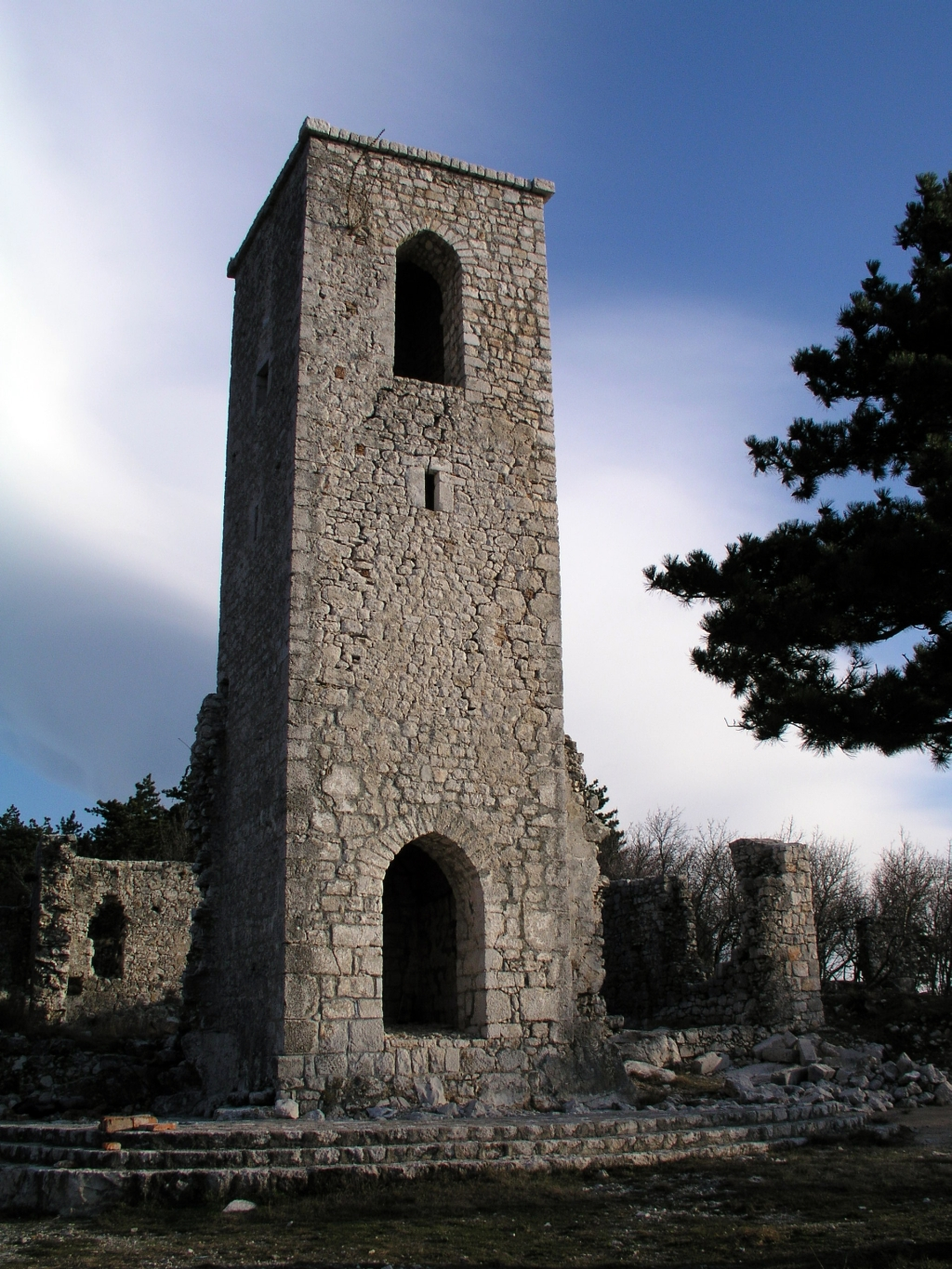
Tower

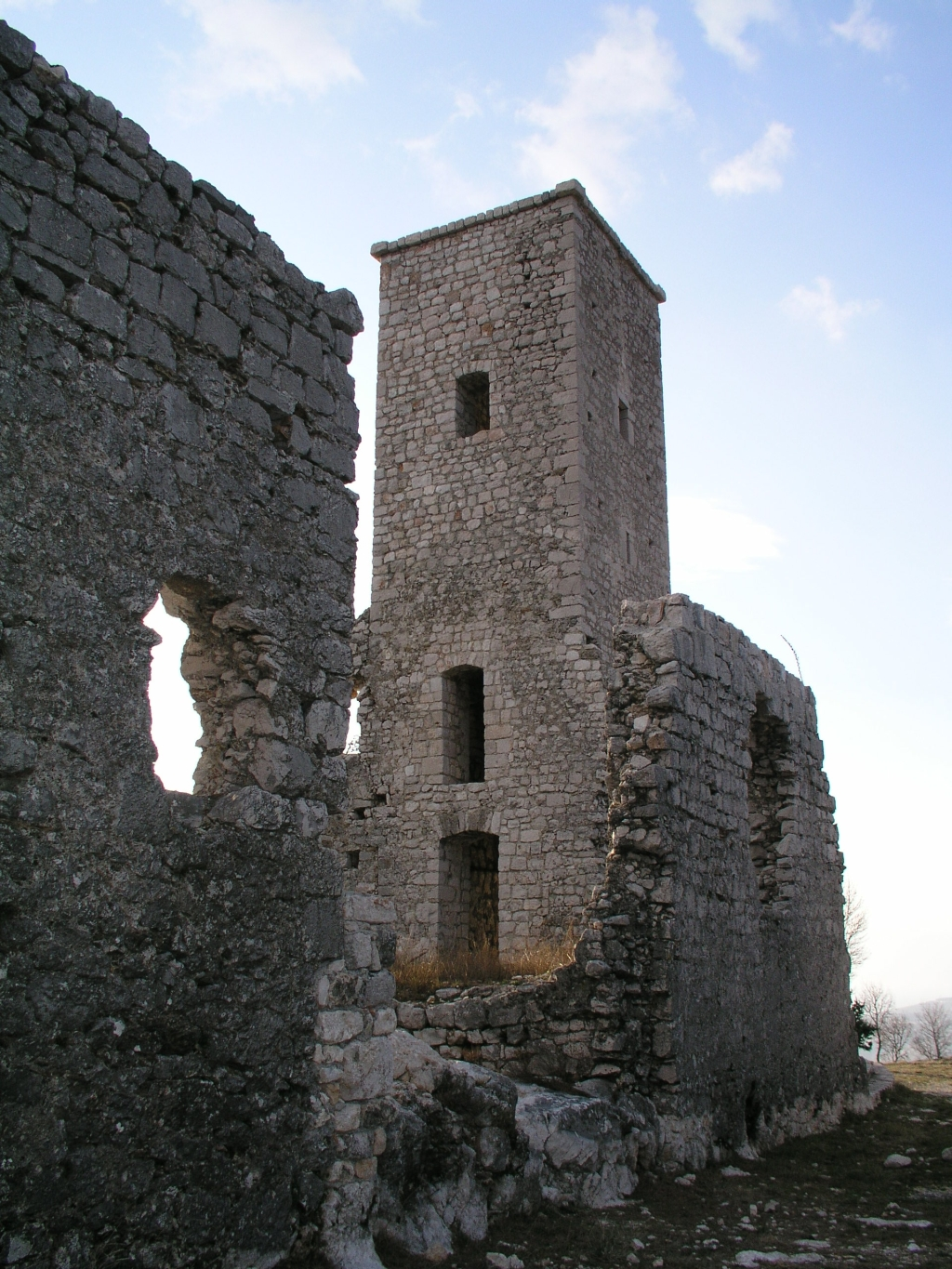
Standing walls

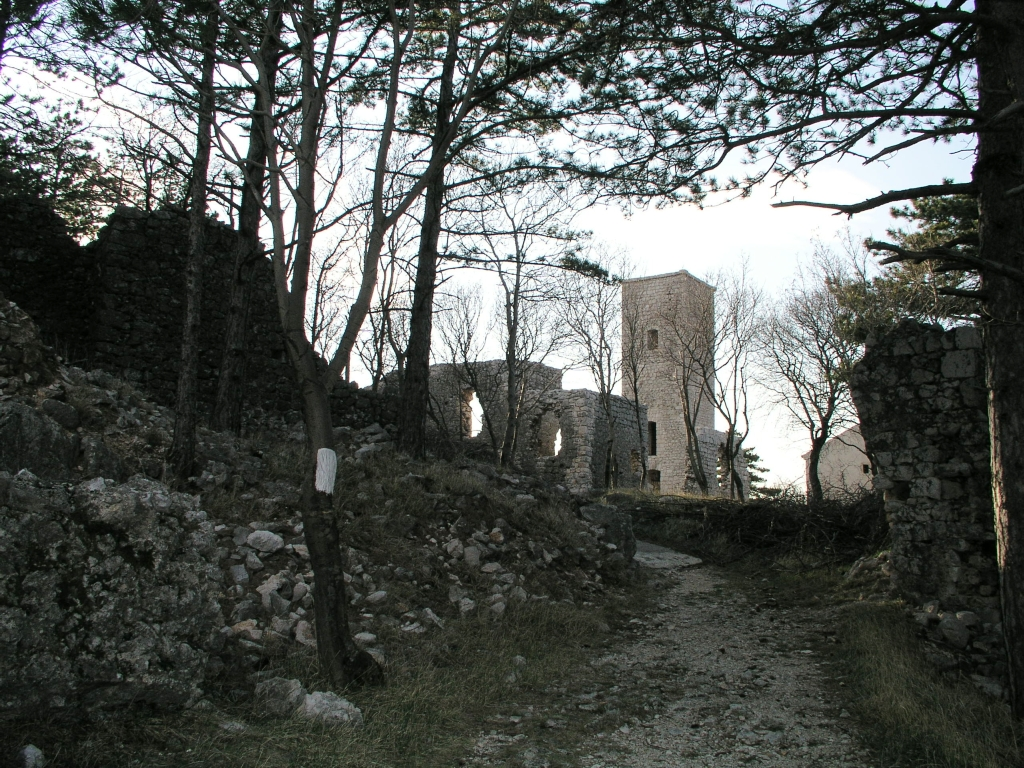
Ruined walls

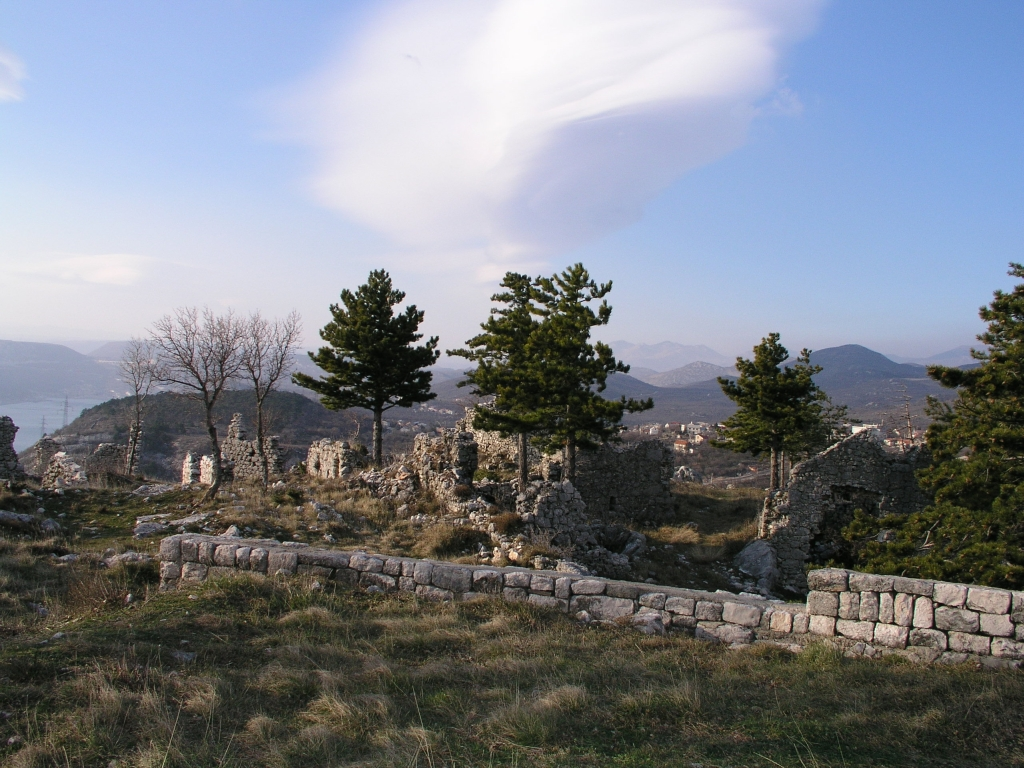
Grounds
