= Bakar mockery =

World War I naval raid

Coordinates: 45.3167°N 14.5333°E

Bakar Mockery (Bakar Raid)
- Part of the Mediterranean Theatre of World War I
| Date | 10–11 February 1918 |
| Location | Bakar, Austria-Hungary |
| Result | Italian propaganda victory |

Belligerents
| Italy | Austria-Hungary |

Commanders and leaders
| Costanzo Ciano | |

Strength
| 3 motor torpedo boats | Coastal defenses of Bakar |

Casualties and losses
| None | One cargo ship slightly damaged |

The Bakar mockery (Italian Beffa di Buccari), or Bakar raid, was a raid of the Italian Navy (Regia Marina) in the last year of World War I. Whilst it had little material effect on the war at sea, it was a particularly bold venture which had a welcome effect on Italian morale, which was at a low ebb following the defeat at Caporetto a few months prior.

== Background ==
In World War I, the Kingdom of Italy fought on the side of the Allies against the Central Powers, including Austria-Hungary and the German Empire. Italy's campaign on land against the Austro-Hungarian Army had been stalemated for two-and-a-half years, with little movement, though at the cost of huge casualties.

At sea, equality with the Austro-Hungarian Navy in capital ships had led to a deadlock in the Adriatic Sea, with neither side wishing to risk their loss; thus the Adriatic campaign was a contest of small ships, of raids and patrols, of sudden actions by night, and of losses to mines and submarines. In this arena, the Italian Regia Marina ("Royal Navy") had developed a commando force of MAS fast motor torpedo boats which attracted men with a buccaneering spirit.

In November 1917 the deadlock on land on the Italian front was upset by an Austro-Hungarian offensive, supported by German forces made available by the collapse of the Russian Empire on the Eastern Front. In the resulting Battle of Caporetto, the Italian Royal Army was defeated, and in a period of three weeks the front was pushed back 50 miles (80 km), to within striking distance of Venice.

== Action ==
The Italians conceived the Bakar Raid as an attack on Austro-Hungarian shipping in the harbor at Bakar (known to the Italians as Buccari), a port on the coast of Austria-Hungary in the enclosed Bay of Bakar near Fiume (now Rijeka) at the head of the Kvarner Gulf. The Austro-Hungarians believed Bakar was beyond Italy's ability to attack, as it lay 80 kilometres (50 mi; 43 nmi) up a sheltered waterway, so the Italians intended the raid as a psychological, as well as a physical, assault.

The operation was led by Capitano di fregata Frigate Captain Costanzo Ciano, and comprised three MAS boats, with a total crew of 30 men. One of the boats, MAS 96, was commanded by Tenente (Lieutenant) Luigi Rizzo, who later led the attack on the Austro-Hungarian battleship SMS Szent István off Premuda in June 1918. Also on board was the Italian nationalist and irredentist poet Gabriele D'Annunzio.

On 10 February 1918 the three MAS boats, under tow by torpedo boats to conserve fuel and escorted by two destroyers and a scout cruiser, set out from their base and at 22:00, after 14 hours' steaming, entered the Farasina Channel, the waterway between Istria and the island of Cherso (now Cres).

Several hours later, having evaded Austro-Hungarian patrols and the shore batteries at Porto Re (now Kraljevica), the flotilla arrived outside the Bay of Bakar. The MAS boats slipped their tows and entered the bay as their escort withdrew. At about 1 nautical mile (1.9 km; 1.2 mi) from the target, the MAS boats switched from gasoline engines to silenced electric motors for the final approach. As they closed with their targets, the three boats fired a total of six torpedoes. However, their boldness was not rewarded, and the torpedoes scored no hits; five became entangled in nets or otherwise failed to explode, while the sixth exploded harmlessly, slightly damaging a cargo ship and raising the alarm.

Despite the alerted enemy, the MAS boats escaped and, making a dash down the channel, regained the open sea where they were reunited with their escort.

== Aftermath ==
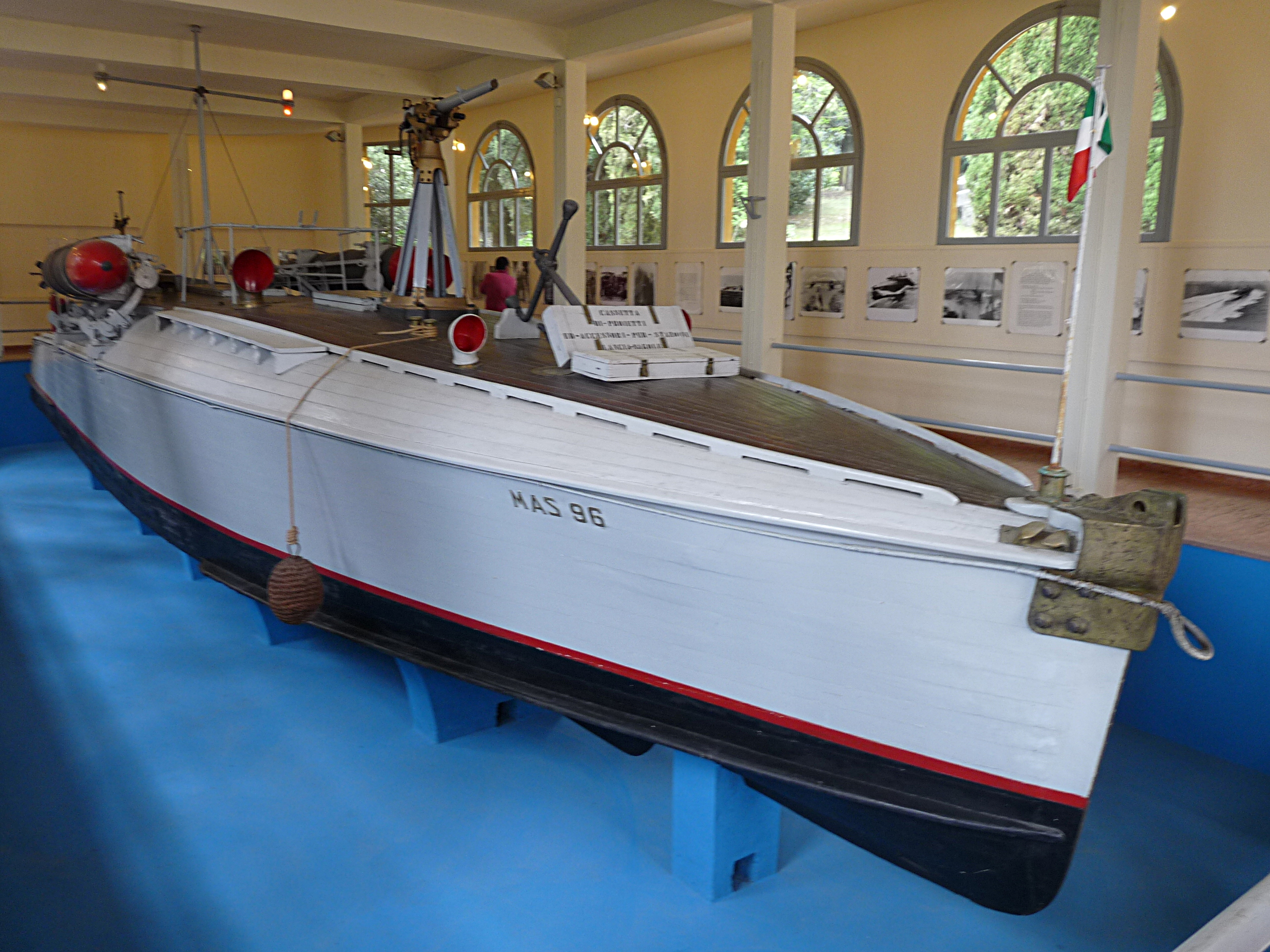
MAS 96 at the Vittoriale degli Italiani.

Despite the lack of material success, the raid was a considerable fillip to Italian morale, as well as a psychological blow to the Austro-Hungarians. In this, it resembled the Doolittle Raid on Tokyo in April 1942 during the Pacific campaign of World War II and prefigured the Flight over Vienna, D'Annunzio's August 1918 air raid on the Austrian capital. The raid became known in Italy as the Beffa di Buccari ("Bakar Mockery") and was heavily publicized by D'Annunzio, who understood its propaganda value; it was celebrated in several booklets at the time.

== Commemoration ==
MAS 96 is preserved at the Vittoriale degli Italiani in Gardone Riviera, Italy.
