= Sušak, Rijeka =

Part of Rijeka, Croatia

Coordinates: 45°19′23″N 14°28′08″E

Sušak
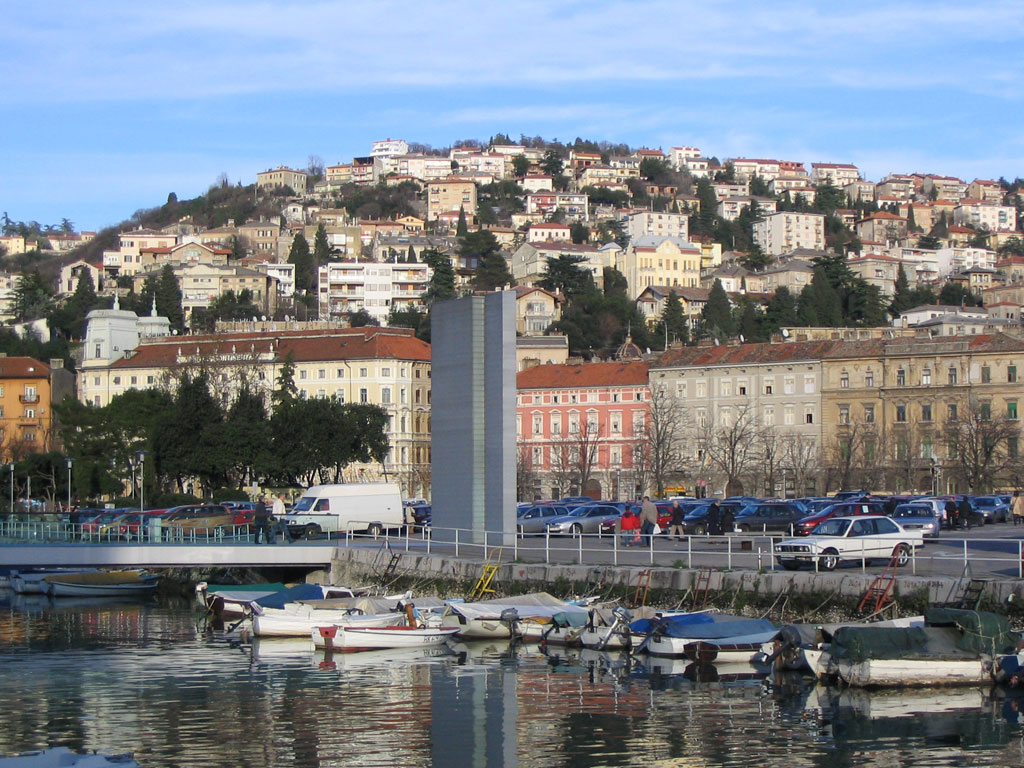
- Western part of Sušak
- Interactive map of Sušak

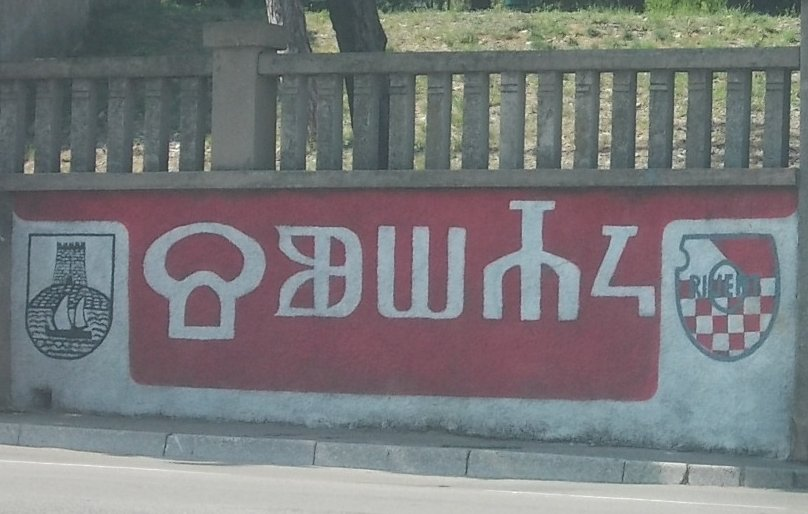
Ⱄⱆⱎⰰⰽ (Sušak in Glagolitic)

Sušak is a part of the city of Rijeka in Croatia, where it composes the eastern part of the city, separated from the city center by the Rječina river, which in former times served as an international border. Notable features of Sušak include the public beaches at Pećine and Glavanovo, along with the Tower Center shopping mall.

== History ==
Under the Habsburg monarchy, Rijeka and the surrounding area technically belonged to the Hungarian half of the Monarchy. Sušak was a municipality separate from the city of Rijeka and since the 19th century, it experienced faster urbanisation and population growth.

=== Kingdom of Yugoslavia ===
In 1924, Rijeka belonged to the independent Free State of Fiume, which had been created four years earlier under the Treaty of Rapallo, but in the Treaty of Rome the Kingdom of Serbs, Croats, and Slovenes and Italy agreed to dissolve the free state. Instead Fiume was annexed to Italy as the Province of Fiume, and Sušak remained with the Kingdom of Serbs, Croats, and Slovenes (later called Yugoslavia), but with joint administration of the port facilities.

In 1930, an HKD Napredak branch was founded in Bakar.

A 22 December 1939 decision as part of agrarian reforms by Ban Šubašić to confiscate the forest property in Sušak and surroundings of the Thurn and Taxis family, Kálmán Ghyczy and Nikola Petrović resulted in a legal dispute known as the Thurn and Taxis Affair, in part because of the relative status of the family and in part because of the proximity to the Italian border.

=== Federal ===
On 1 February 1948 elections for the City Councils in Rijeka were held, thus creating the foundations for joining Rijeka and Sušak. The town councils of Sušak and Rijeka proposed to the Presidium of the Croatian Parliament that the two towns were joined together, and on 10 February 1947, the Peace Agreement between the FNRJ and Italy in Paris 175 km2 internationally belonged to Yugoslavia and Croatia. On 12 February 1948, the first session of the NO Rijeka was held when Rijeka was established.

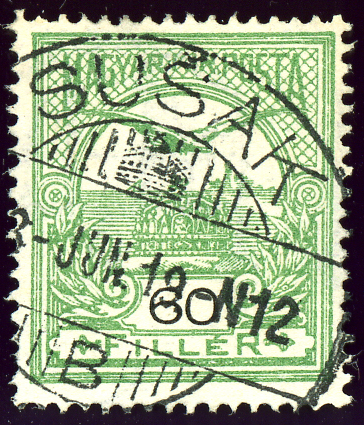
Kingdom of Hungary stamp, cancelled SUŠAK in 1913 (Croatia-Slavonia)

The football club in Sušak is NK Orijent.

== Demographics ==
In 1890, the obćina of Trsat (court at Sušak), with an area of 20 square kilometres (7.7 mi^{2}), belonged to the kotar of Sušak (Bakar court and electoral district) in the županija of Modruš-Rieka (Ogulin court and financial board). There were 1281 houses, with a population of 8327 (highest in Sušak kotar). Its 18 villages and 11 hamlets were divided for taxation purposes into 5 porezne obćine, under the Bakar office. In the 355 square kilometres (137 mi^{2}) Sušak kotar, there were a total of 5366 houses, with a population of 26,290. Its 73 villages and 43 hamlets were divided into 24 porezne obćine. The kotar's only statistical market was at Kraljevica. Sušak kotar was divided into 8 općine: Bakarac, Cernik, Grobnik, Hreljin, Jelenje, Kraljevica, Krasica and Trsat.

In 1910, the court of Sušak encompassed an area of 215 square kilometres (83 mi^{2}), with a population of 21,028. Sušak had its own cadastral jurisdiction and business court.

== Sports ==
The local chapter of the HPS is HPD "Velebit", which had 343 members in 1936 under the Viktor Ružić presidency, being one of the largest in the society at the time. At the time, it also had ski and photography sections. Membership rose to 350 in 1938.

== Infrastructure ==
In 1913, there were two gendarmeries in Sušak kotar: Sušak and Kraljevica.

== In literature ==
In her 1941 travel book, Black Lamb and Grey Falcon, Rebecca West dedicates a chapter to "Sushak" (sic). At the moment of the writing the city was a separate town from Fiume, as described above. Of the border area, she writes, "There we found a town that has the quality of a dream, a bad headachy dream. ...And at places where no frontiers could possibly be, in the middle of a square, or on a bridge linking the parts of a quay, men in uniform step forward and demand passports..."

== Notable people ==
- Janko Polić Kamov
- Lovro von Matačić
- Petar Omčikus
- Ödön von Horvath

== See also ==
- Treaty of Nettuno

== Bibliography ==
- Prusac, Stjepan (2023-09-26) [defended 2023-09-25]. Posjedi obitelji Thurn Taxis nakon 1918. godine [Thurn Taxis Estates in Croatia after First World War] (Thesis) (in Croatian). Zagreb: Filozofski fakultet Sveučilišta u Zagrebu.
- Matić, Zdravko (2004-12-22). "Osnivanje i rad "Napretkovih" organizacija na području Hrvatskog primorja i Gorskog kotara (1928. - 1950.)" [The Foundation and Work of "Napredak" Organisations on the Territory of Hrvatsko Primorje and Gorski Kotar]. Časopis za suvremenu povijest (in Croatian). 36 (3): 1183–1204. ISSN 1848-9079.
- Banska vlast Banovine Hrvatske (1940b). "Gospodarska prosvjeta i banovinska dobra". Godišnjak banske vlasti Banovine Hrvatske. Vol. 1. pp. 89–96.
