= Hreljin =

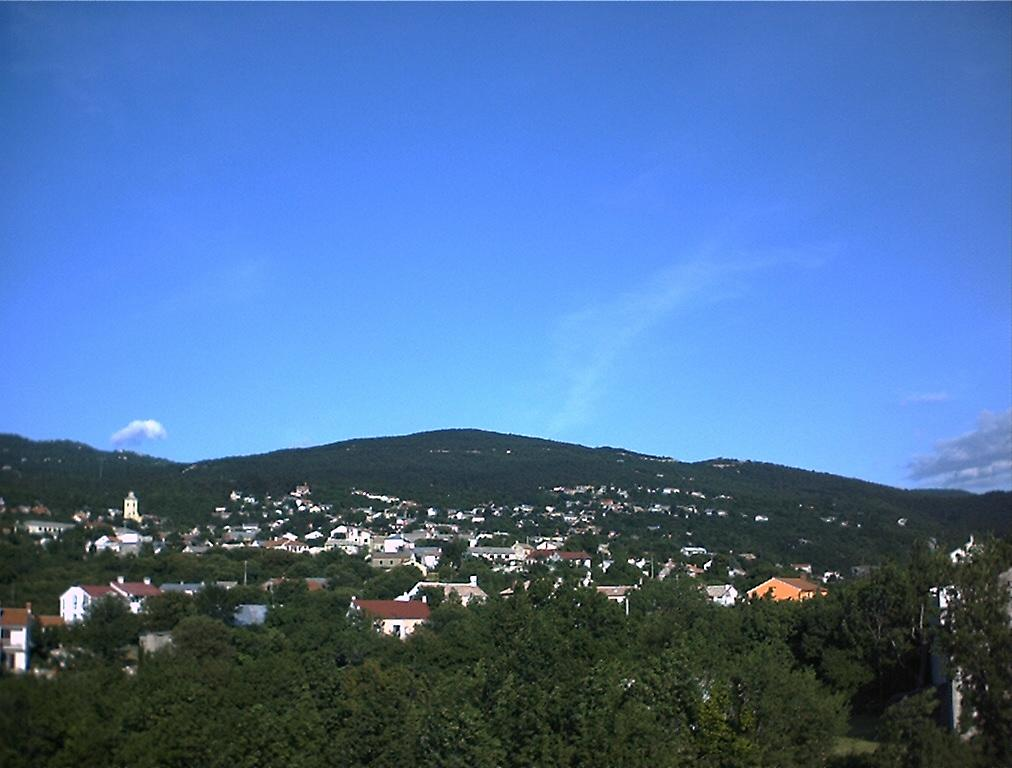

- Location of Hreljin in Croatia
- Coordinates: 45°16′59″N 14°35′56″E
- Country: Croatia

Area
  - Total: 35.1 km^{2} (13.6 sq mi)

Population (2021)
  - Total: 2,139
  - Density: 60.9/km^{2} (158/sq mi)

Hreljin is a village in western Croatia, just southeast of Bakar and northeast of Kraljevica, above Bay of Bakar (Croatian: Bakarski zaljev).

Hreljin administratively belongs to the city of Bakar, situated in Primorje-Gorski Kotar County - Primorsko-goranska županija.

The village includes the hamlets of Solnice (center of village), Pod Solnice, Biljin, Raskrizje, Stara cesta, Copovsko, Knezovo, Tursko, Vidasko, Sobolsko, Zastene, Gaj, Maj, Lonja, Glavicina, Dorisko, Placa, Kalac, Dragisino, Hrustica, Popelisce, Princica, Kalvarija, Cerkul, Fister, Melnice and Plase.

== History ==
Legend claims that a Greek named Herkul founded the village.

In 1228 Hreljin signed the Vinodol act making Hreljin Castle one of nine Vinodol castles.

Hreljin was mentioned on 22 February 1481 in a document freeing the citizens of Grič from tariffs in Hreljin and elsewhere.

In 1607 and 1608, Nikola VI Zrinski complained to the Slavonian Sabor about certain violent acts committed by the soldiers of Senj in the Bay of Bakar, where they plundered and wrecked two ships loaded with oil and grain.

On 25 March 2022 at 16:53 the ŽVOC Rijeka received a call about a wildfire in the area. 8 hectares (20 acres) burned by the time it was put out at 22:16 by JVP Rijeka, DVD Hreljin, DVD Zlobin, DVD Škrljevo and DVD Bakar.

== Demographics ==
In 1895, the obćina of Hreljin (court at Hreljin), with an area of 40.97 square kilometres (15.82 mi^{2}), belonged to the kotar of Sušak (Bakar court and electoral district) in the županija of Modruš-Rieka (Ogulin court and financial board). There were 815 houses, with a population of 3587. Its 9 villages were divided for taxation purposes into 3 porezne obćine, under the Bakar office.

== Governance ==
=== Local ===
It is the seat of its own local committee.

== Gallery ==
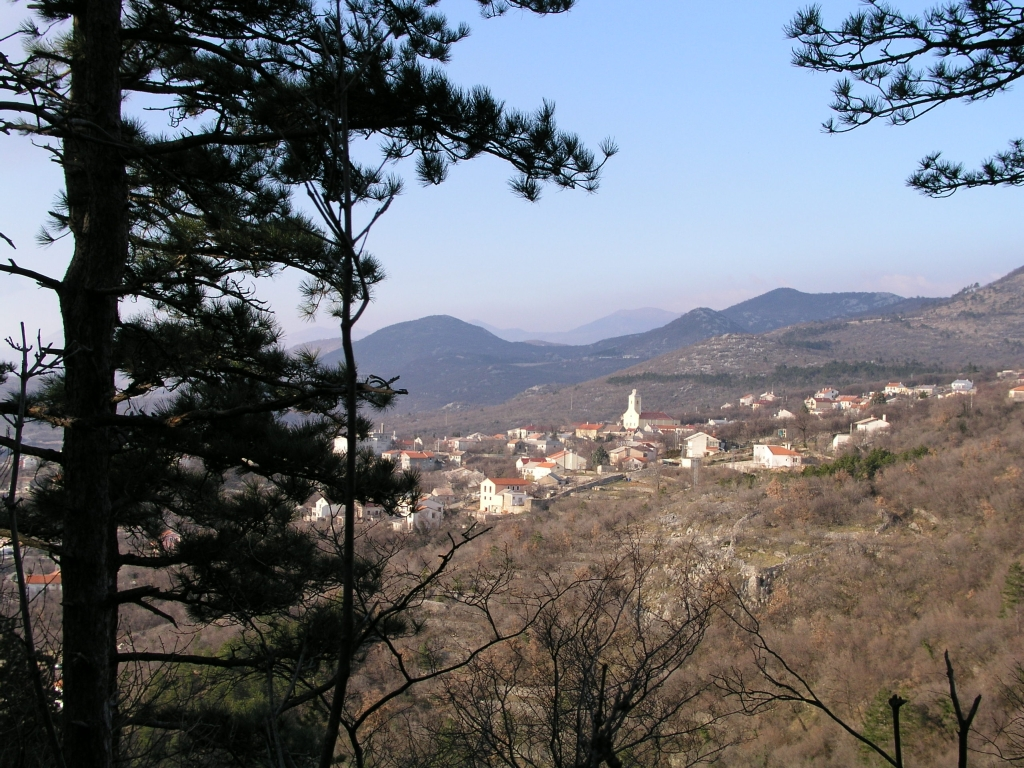
From above

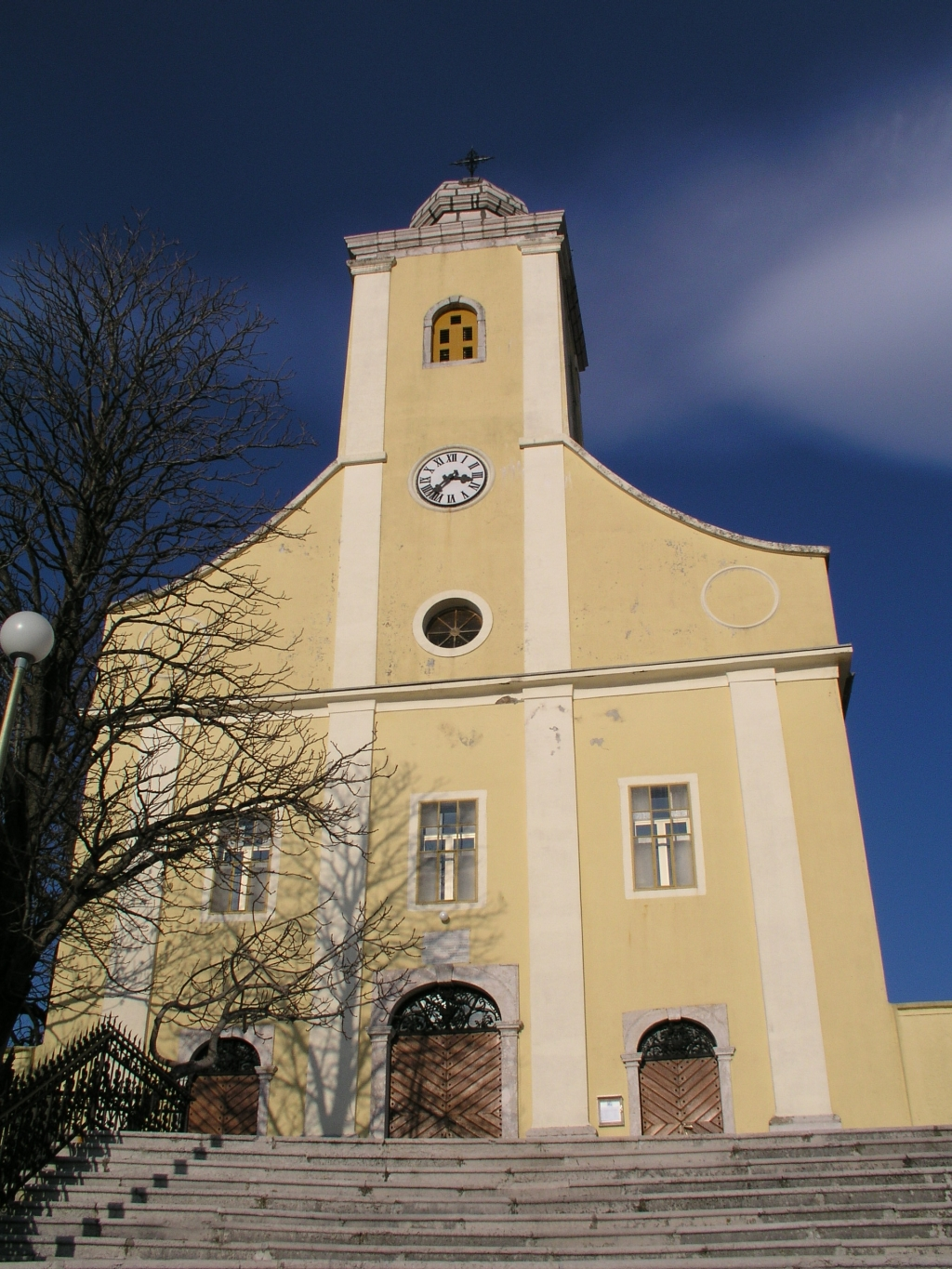
Sv. Jurja church

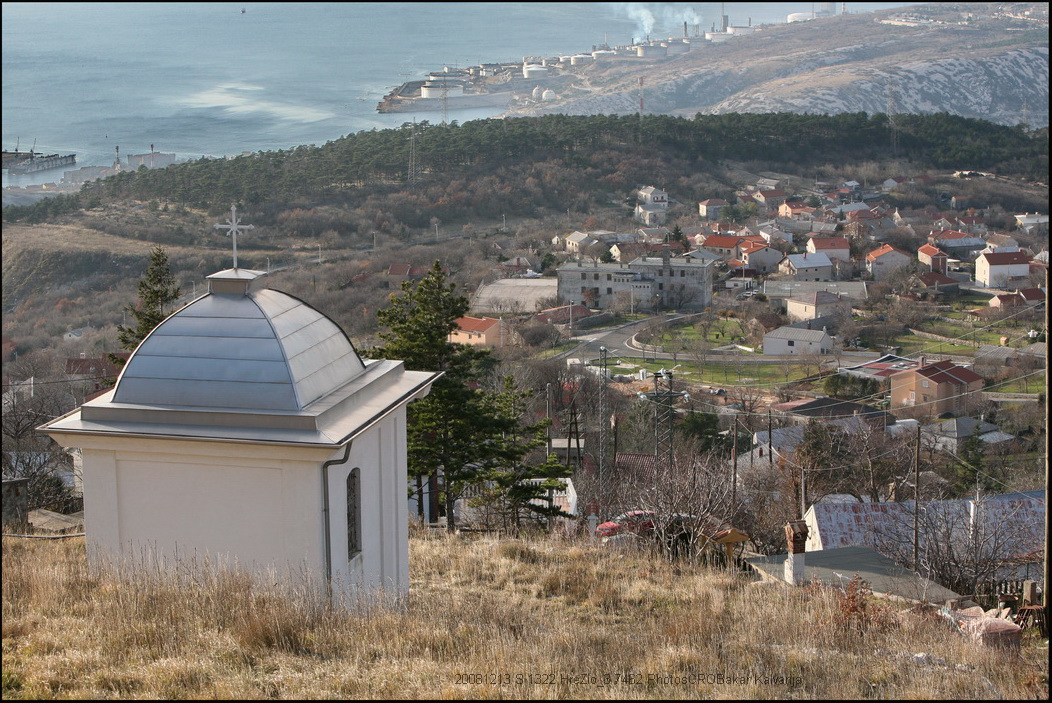
Hreljin from above

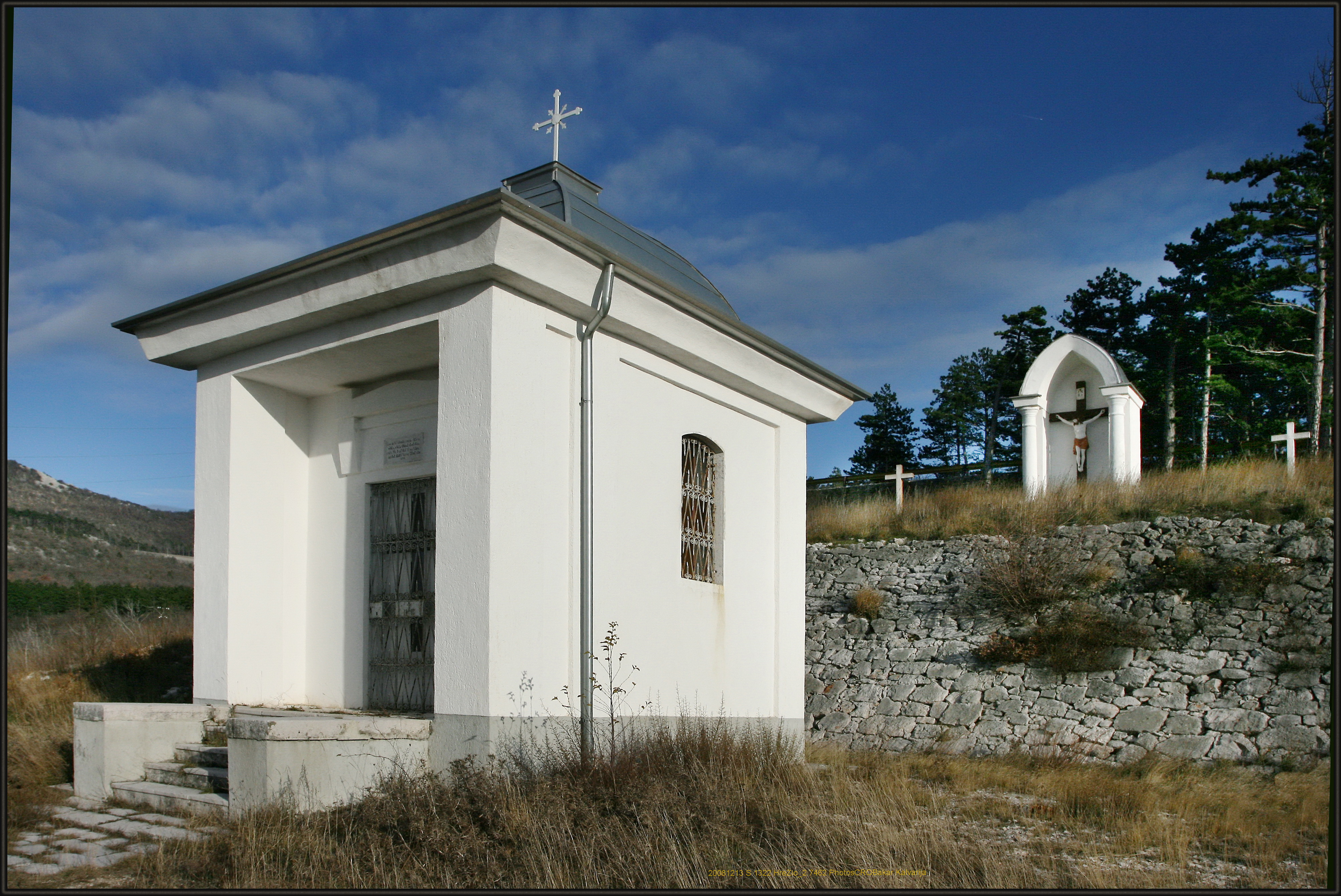
Kalvarija Hreljin

== See also ==
- Desinec
- Hrvace
