= Krasica =

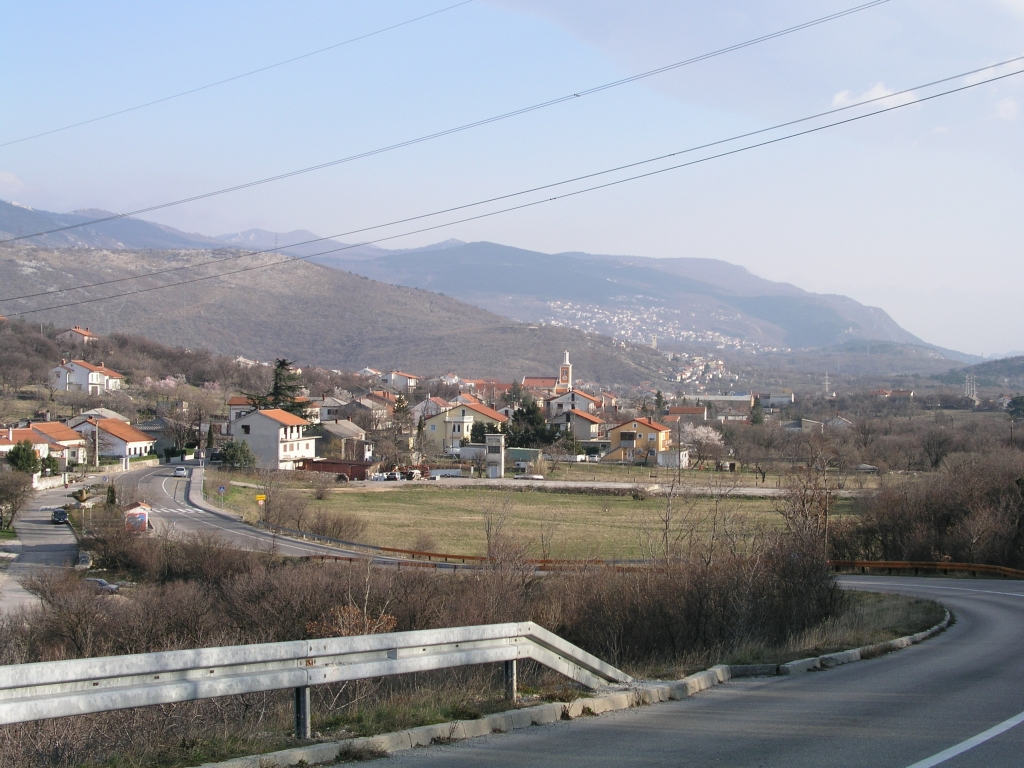

- Location within Croatia
- Coordinates: 45.310038°N 14.554181°E
- Country: Croatia
- County: Primorje-Gorski Kotar

Area
  - Total: 27.0 km^{2} (10.4 sq mi)

Population (2021)
  - Total: 1,325
  - Density: 49.1/km^{2} (127/sq mi)

Krasica is a village in Primorje, Croatia, located northeast of Bakar. The population is 1,353 (census 2011). Krasica is known for masquerade, a recognizable custom of these areas.

== Demographics ==
In 1895, the obćina of Krasica (court at Krasica), with an area of 81 square kilometres (31 mi^{2}), belonged to the kotar of Sušak (Bakar court and electoral district) in the županija of Modruš-Rieka (Ogulin court and financial board). There were 1155 houses, with a population of 4559. Its 12 villages and 9 hamlets were divided for taxation purposes into 5 porezne obćine, under the Bakar office.

== Governance ==
=== Local ===
It is the seat of its own local committee.

== Infrastructure ==
In the 1935–1936 season, the mountain hut, on Gornje Jelenje, at 882 metres (2,894 ft) in elevation, was closed.

== Gallery ==
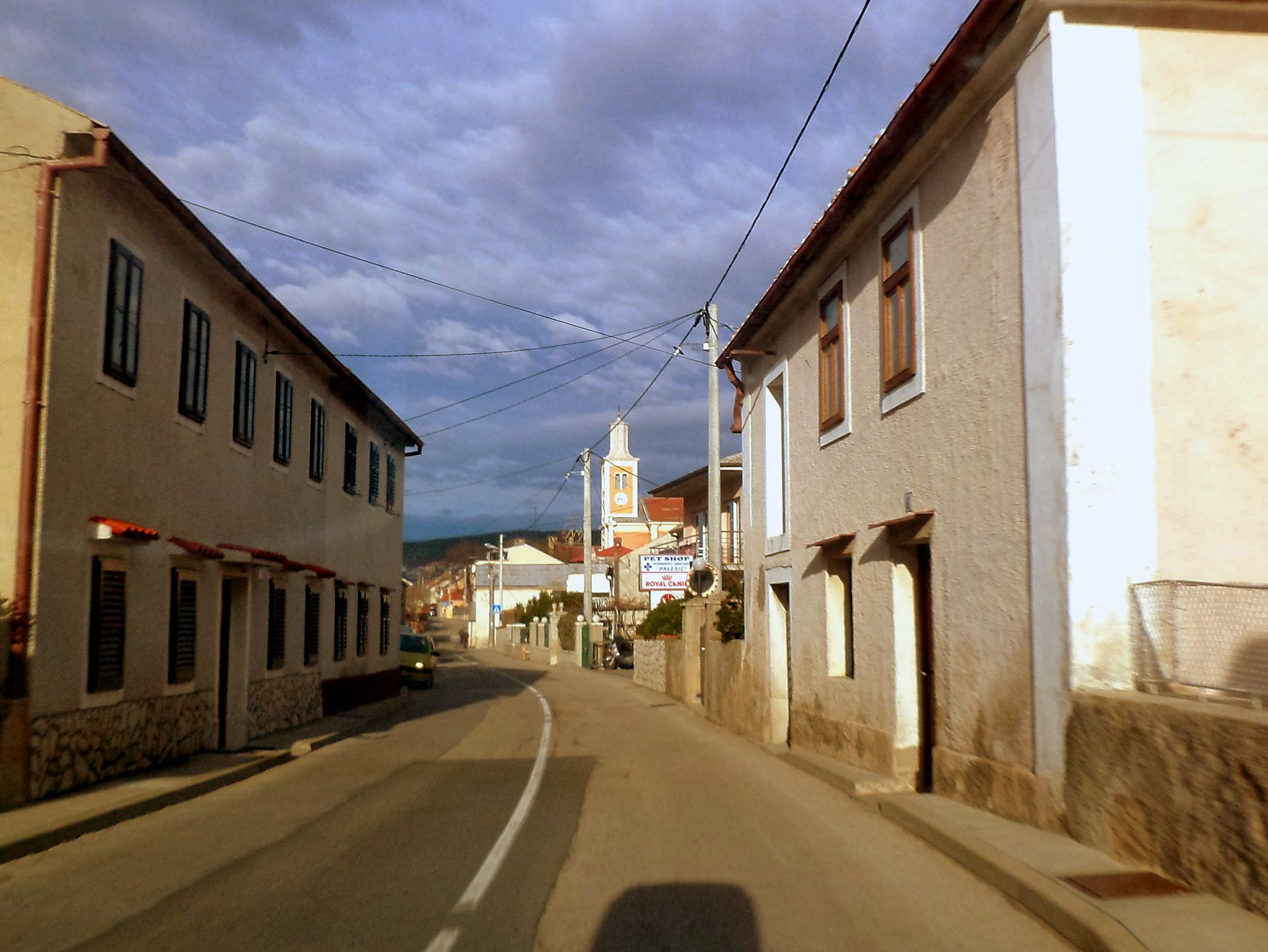
Main street

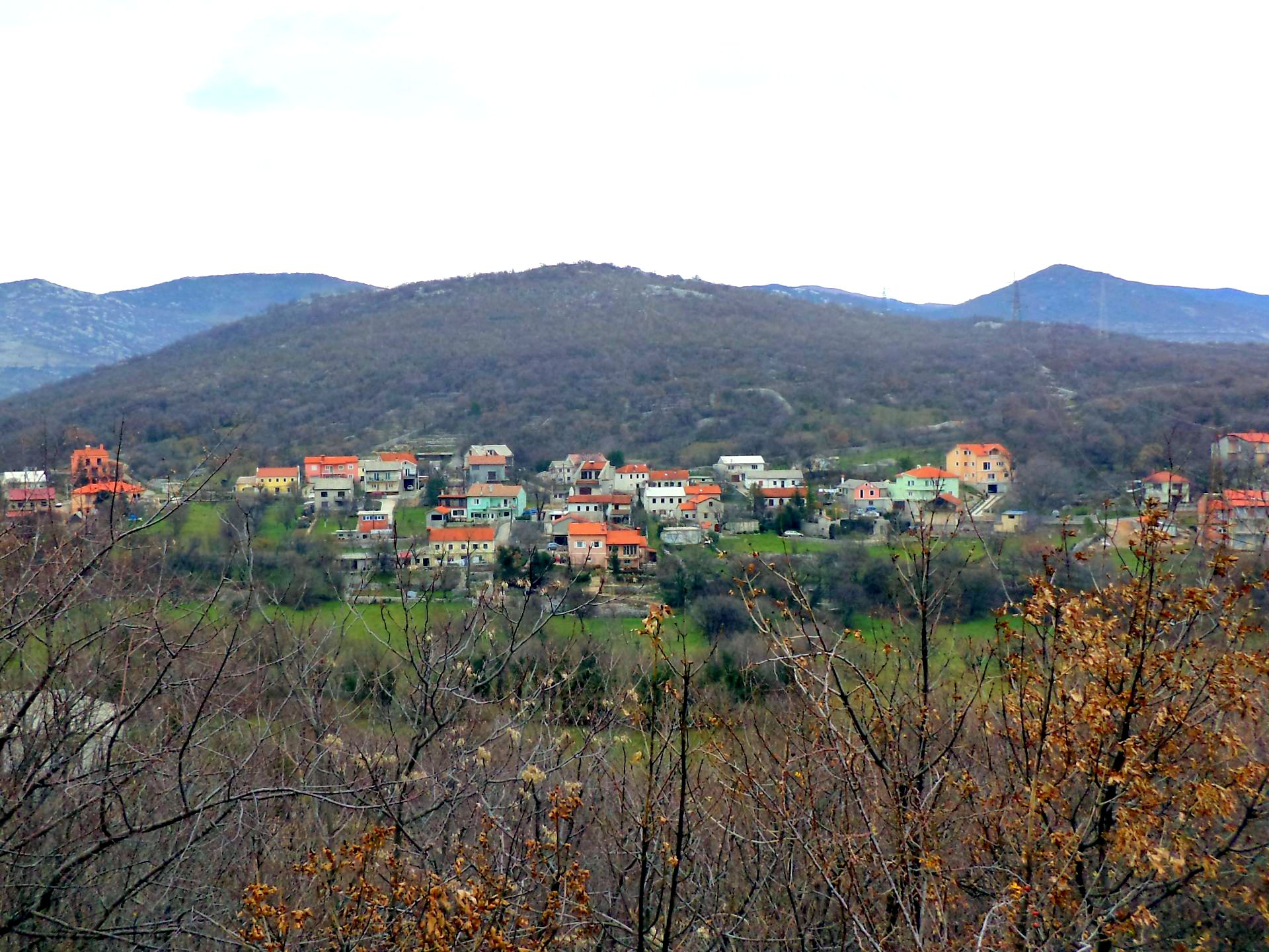
Jeloka

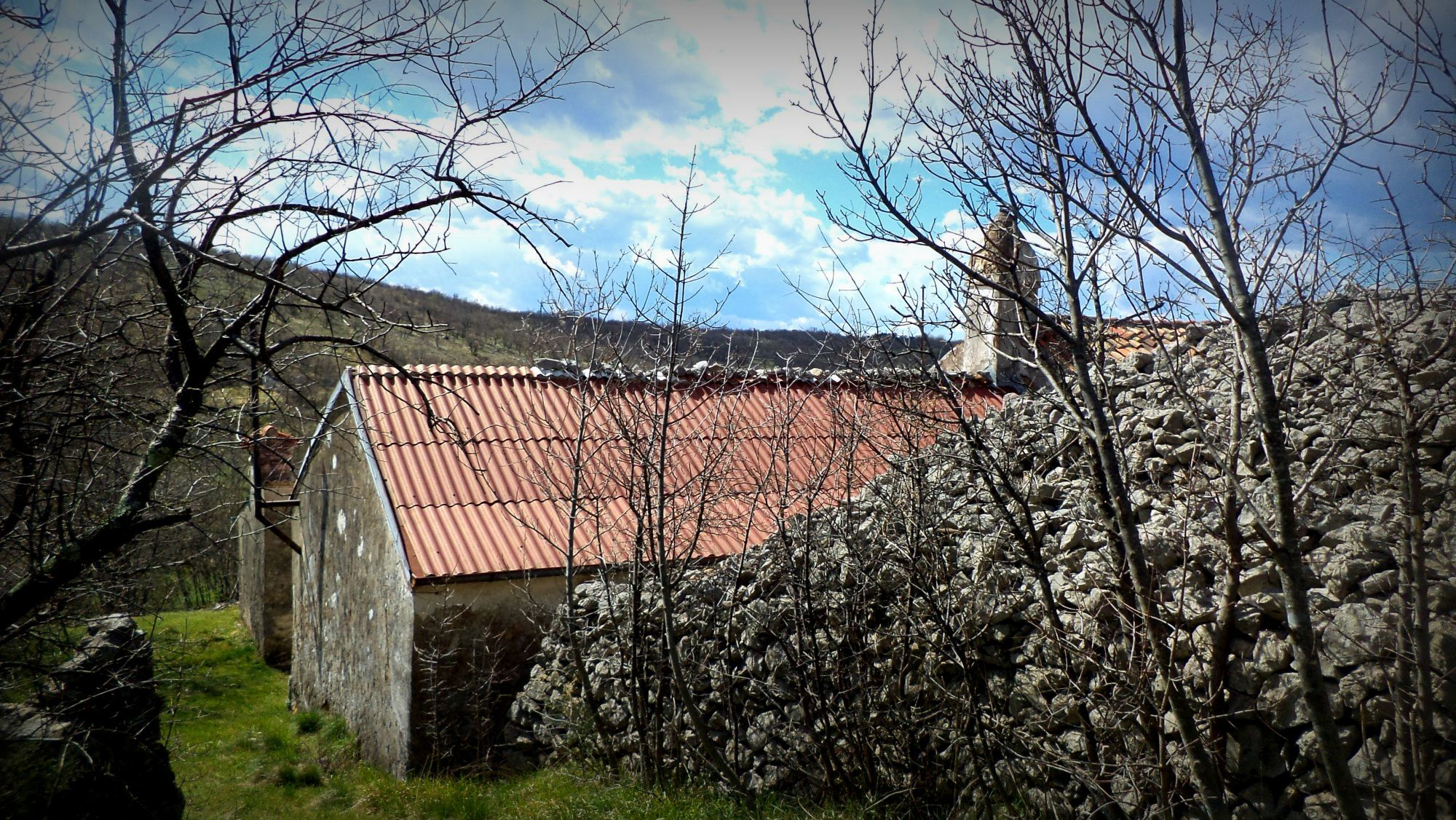
Randiška Višnjevica

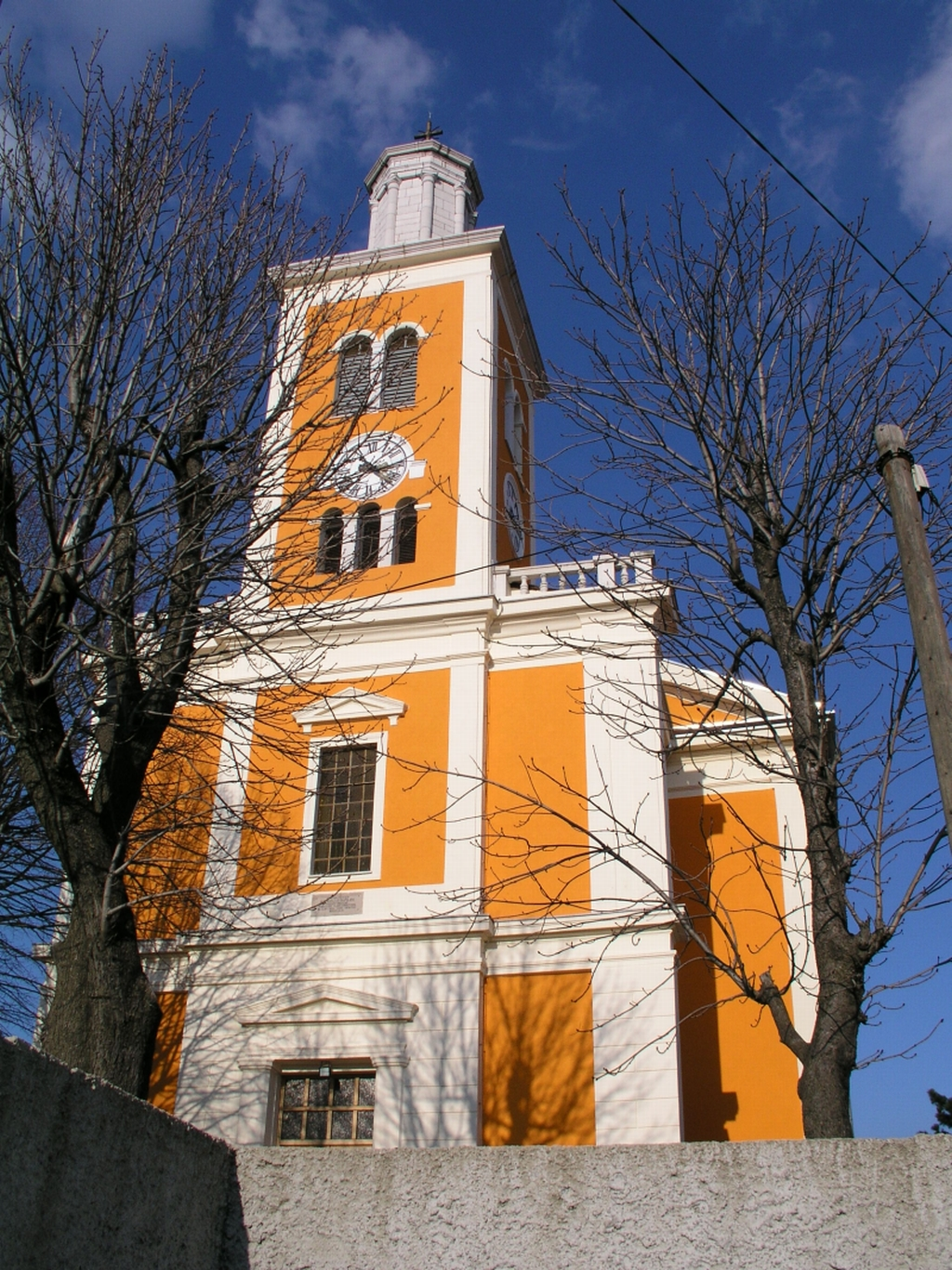
Church

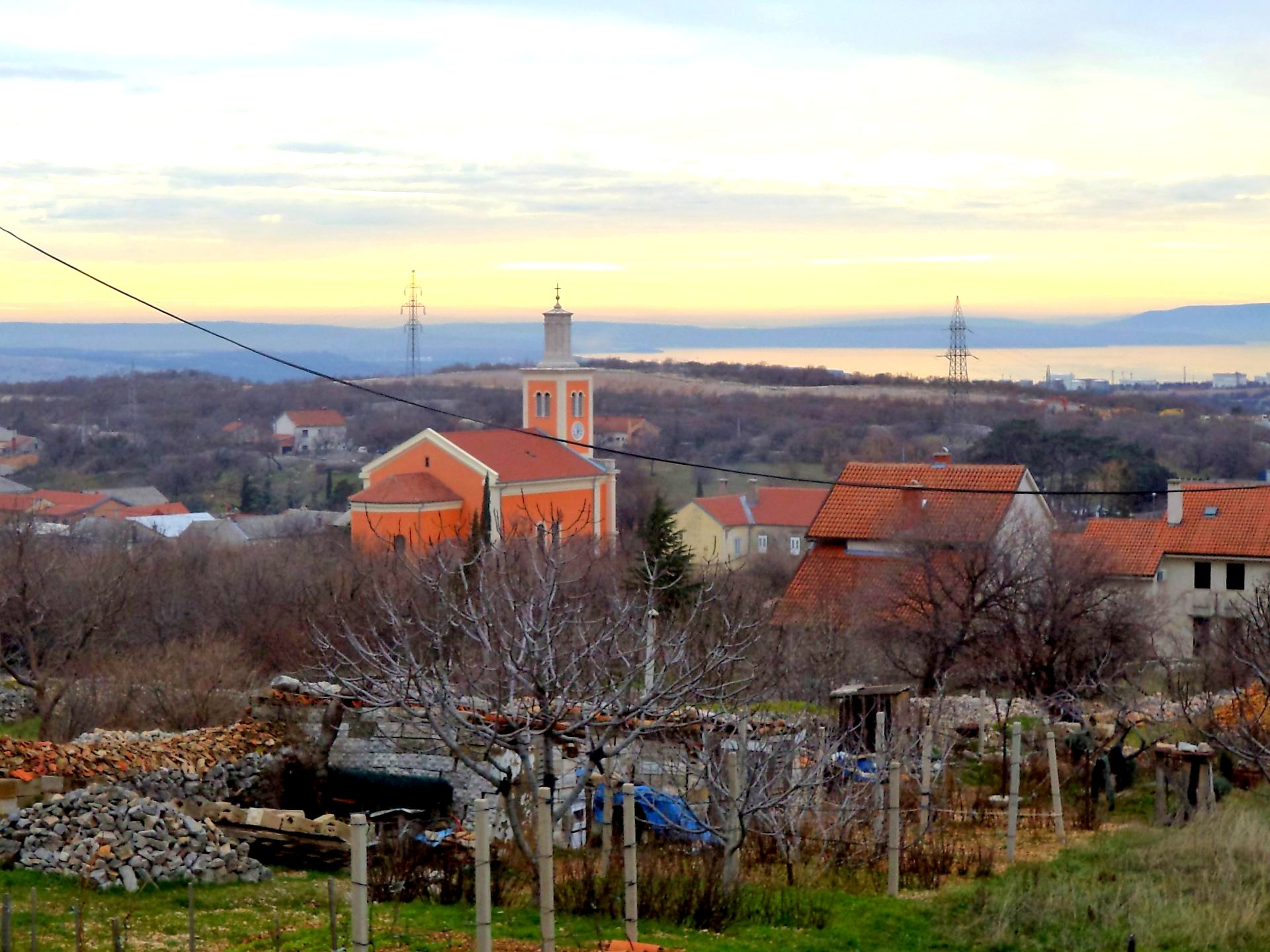
Church apse

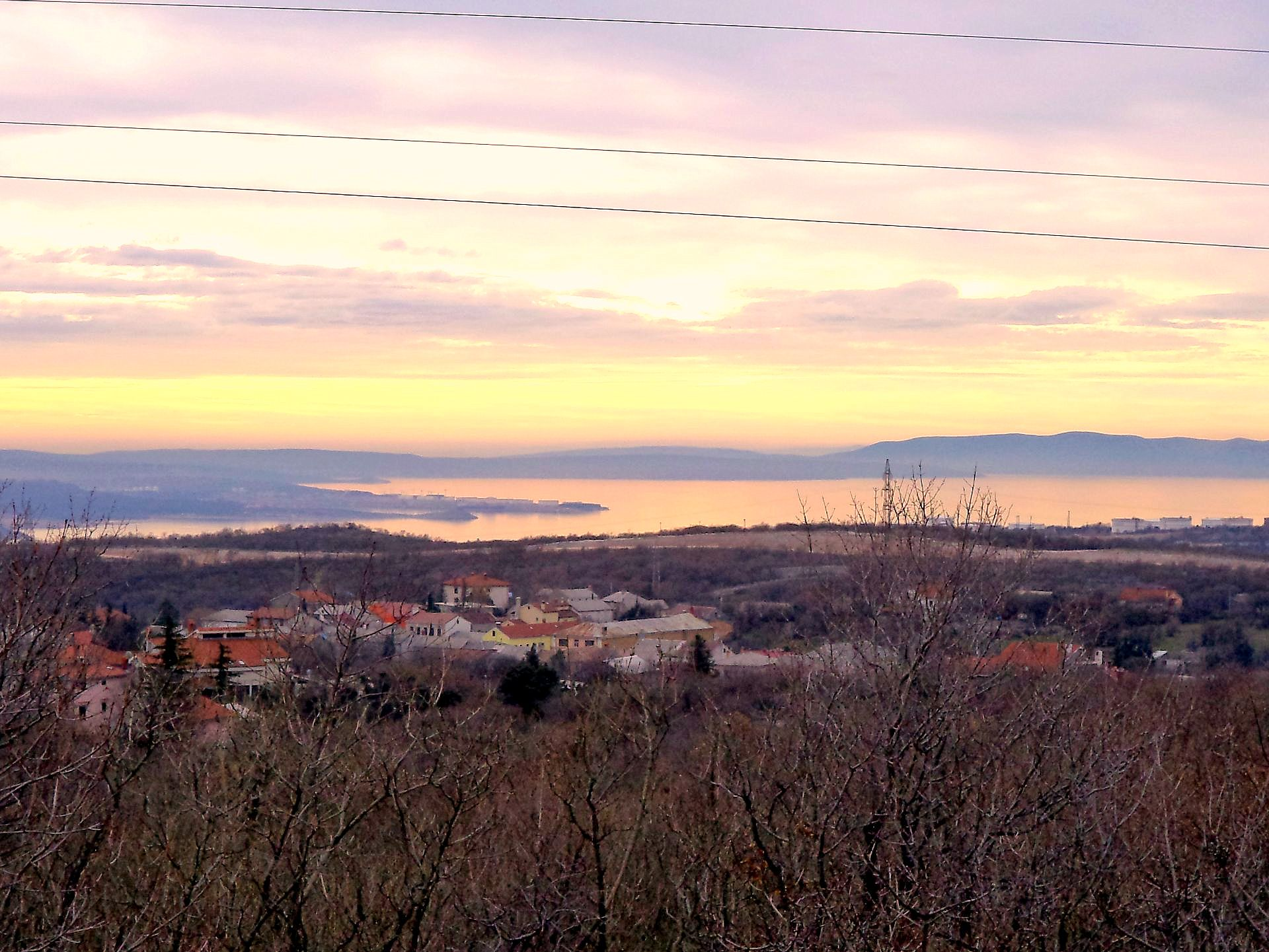
View of Kvarner Gulf
