= Zlobin, Croatia =

Village in Primorje-Gorski Kotar County, Croatia

Zlobin
- Village
- Location within Croatia

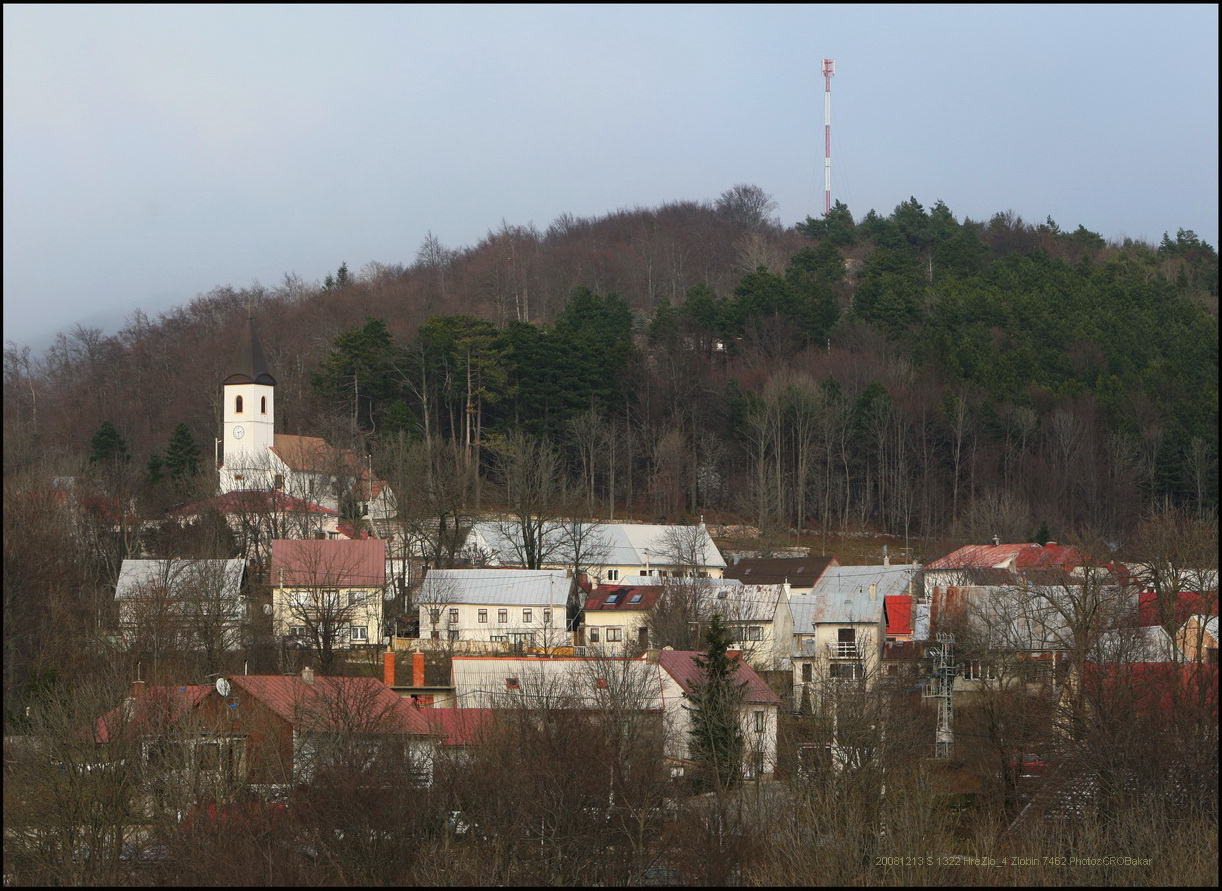
- Coordinates: 45.29102°N 14.65287°E Zlobin
- Country: Croatia
- County: Primorje-Gorski Kotar County
- Town: Bakar

Area
  - Total: 5.9 km^{2} (2.3 sq mi)

Population (2021)
  - Total: 272
  - Density: 46/km^{2} (120/sq mi)
- Time zone: UTC+1 (CET)
  - Summer (DST): UTC+2 (CEST)
- Postal code: 51324
- Area code: 051
- Vehicle registration: RI

Zlobin is a village in Primorje-Gorski Kotar County, western Croatia. Administratively a part of the town of Bakar, it is located approximately 5 km southwest of Fužine. As of 2021, it had a population of 272. Zlobin is connected by the M202 railway.

== Governance ==
=== Local ===
It is the seat of its own local committee.
