= Bakar, Croatia =

Bakar
- Town
- Grad Bakar; Town of Bakar
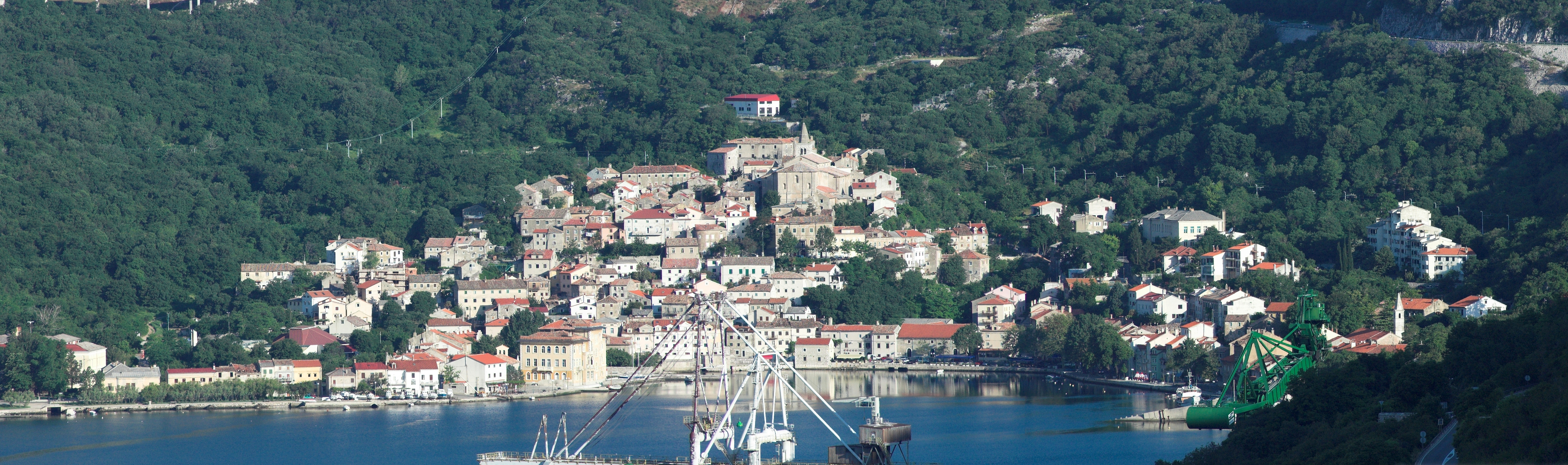
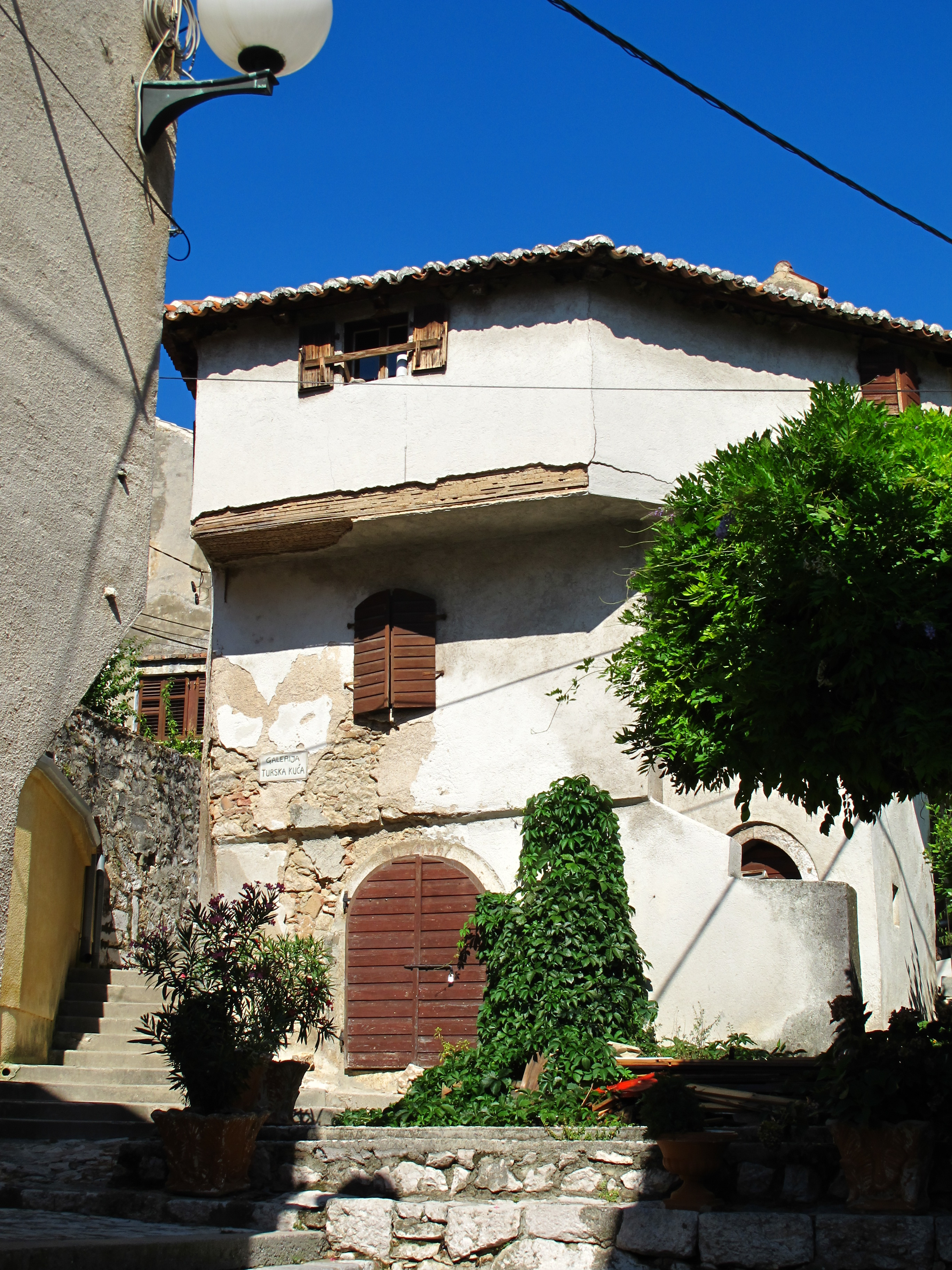
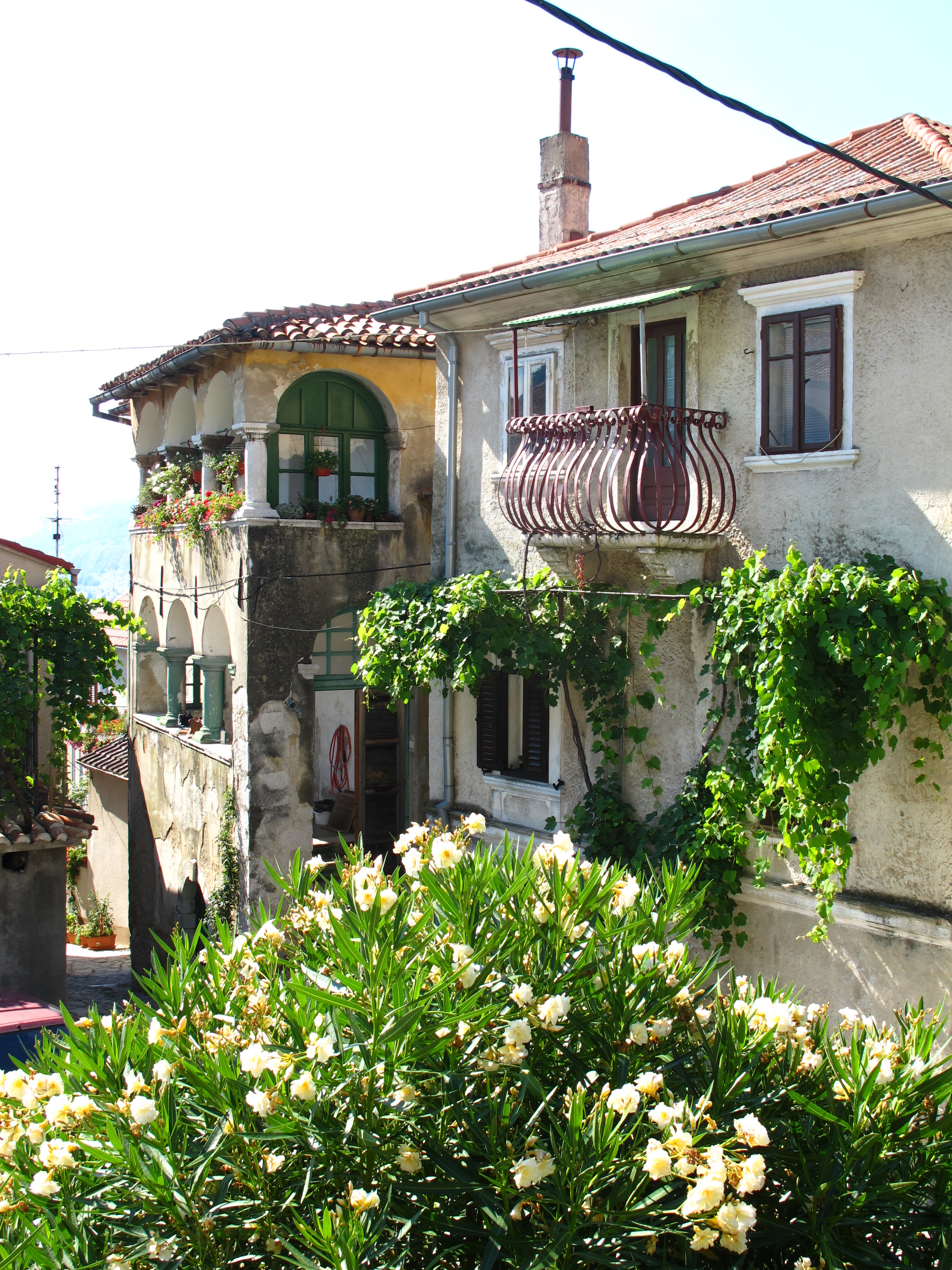
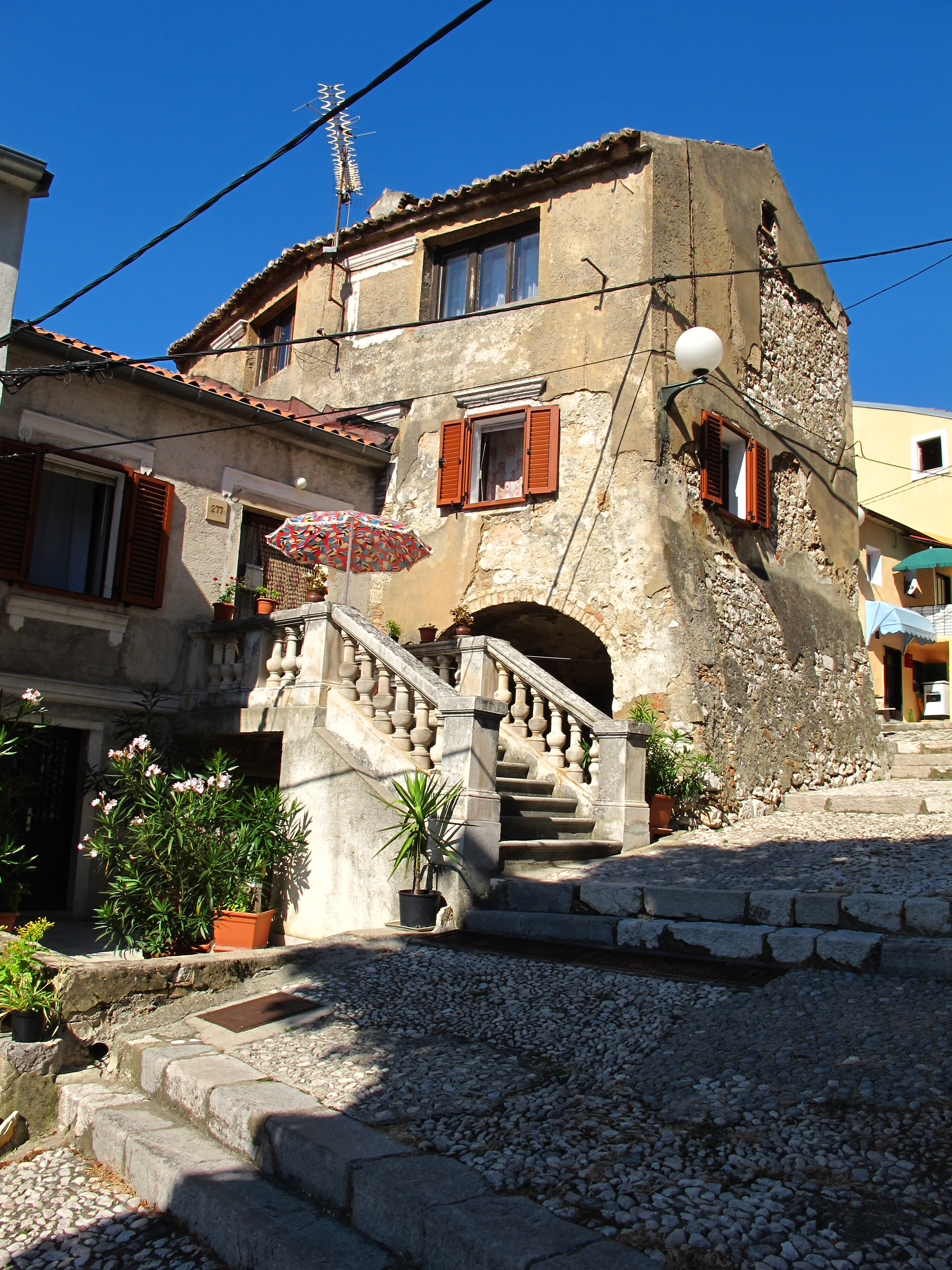
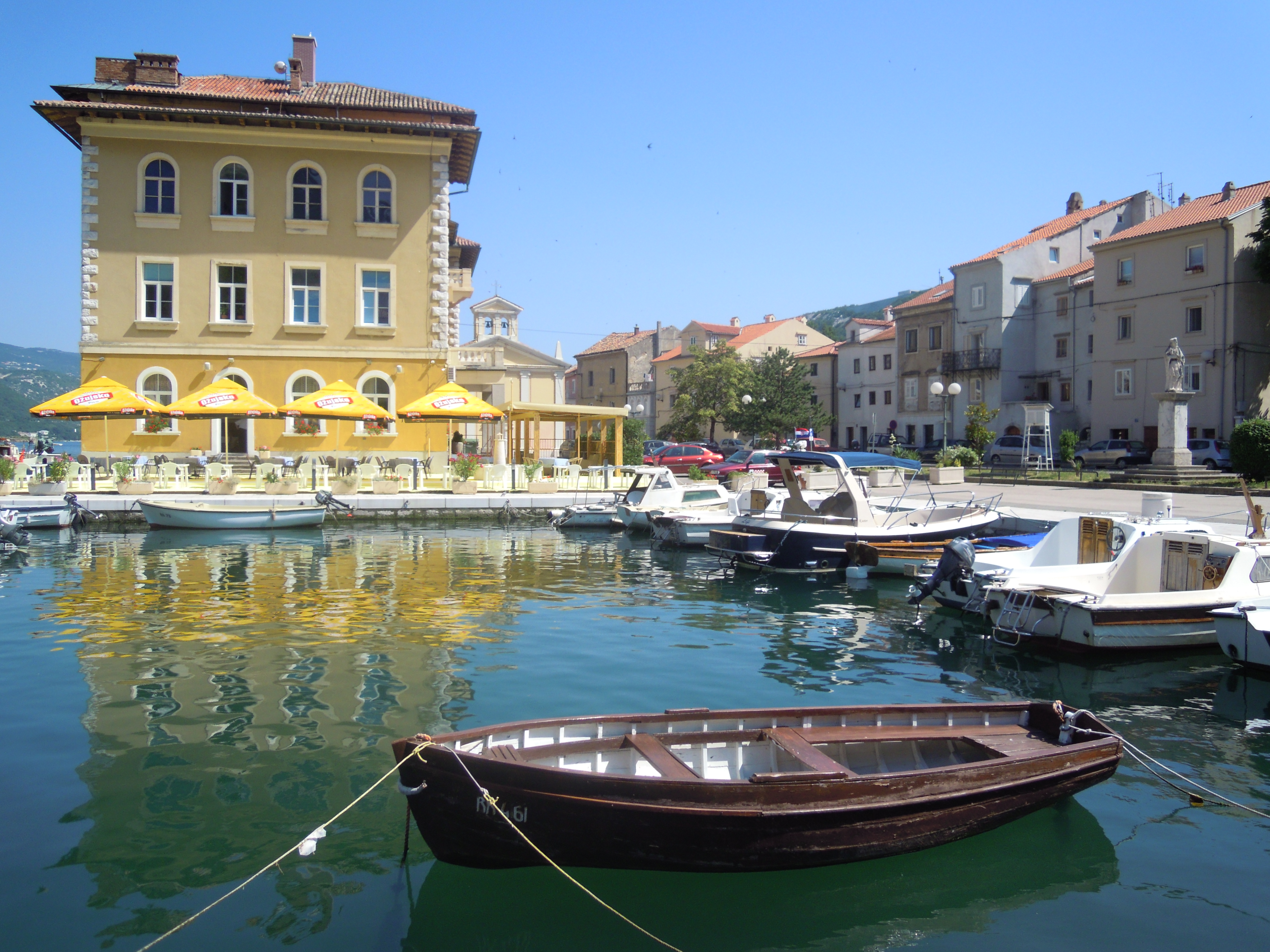
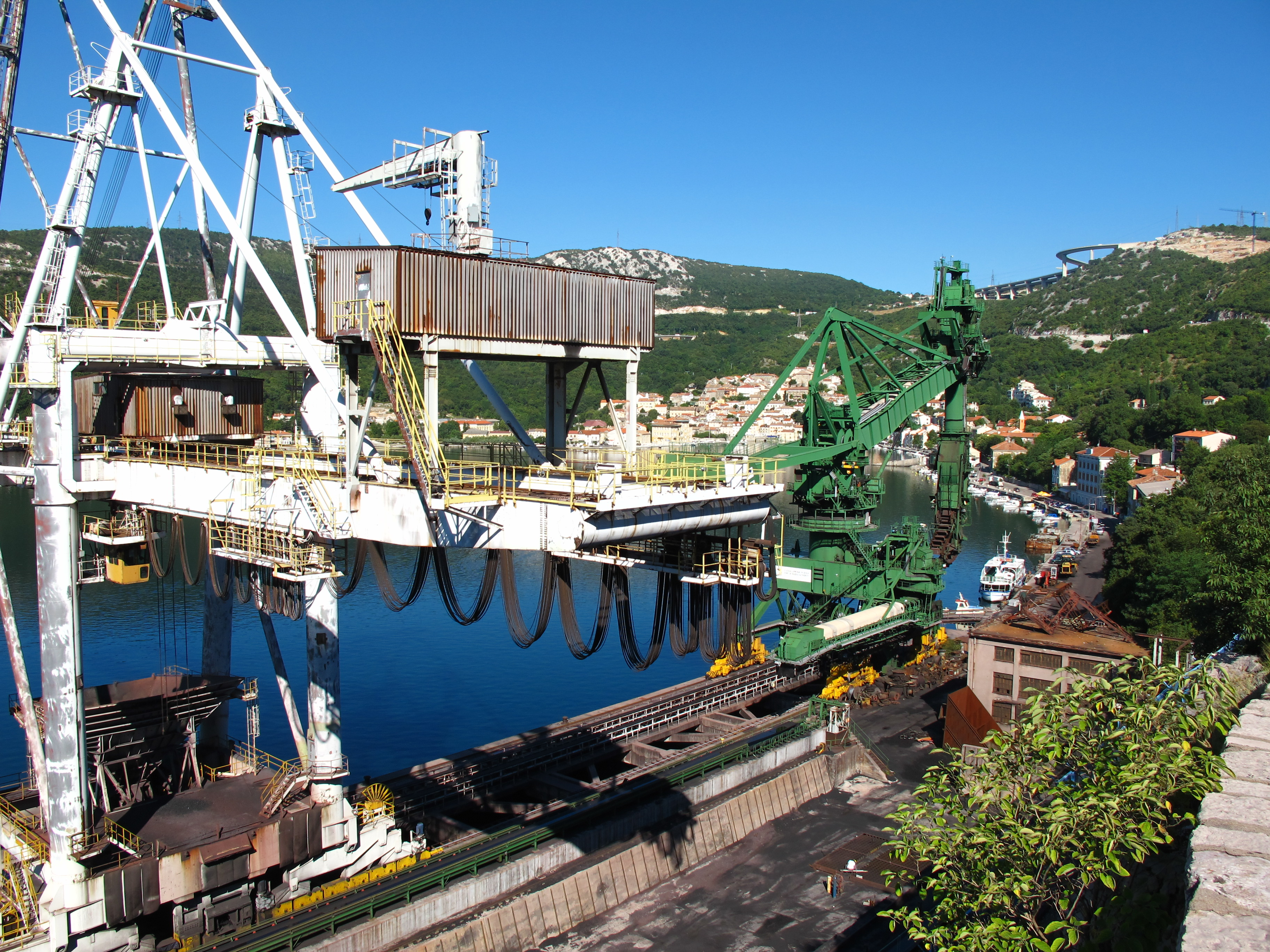
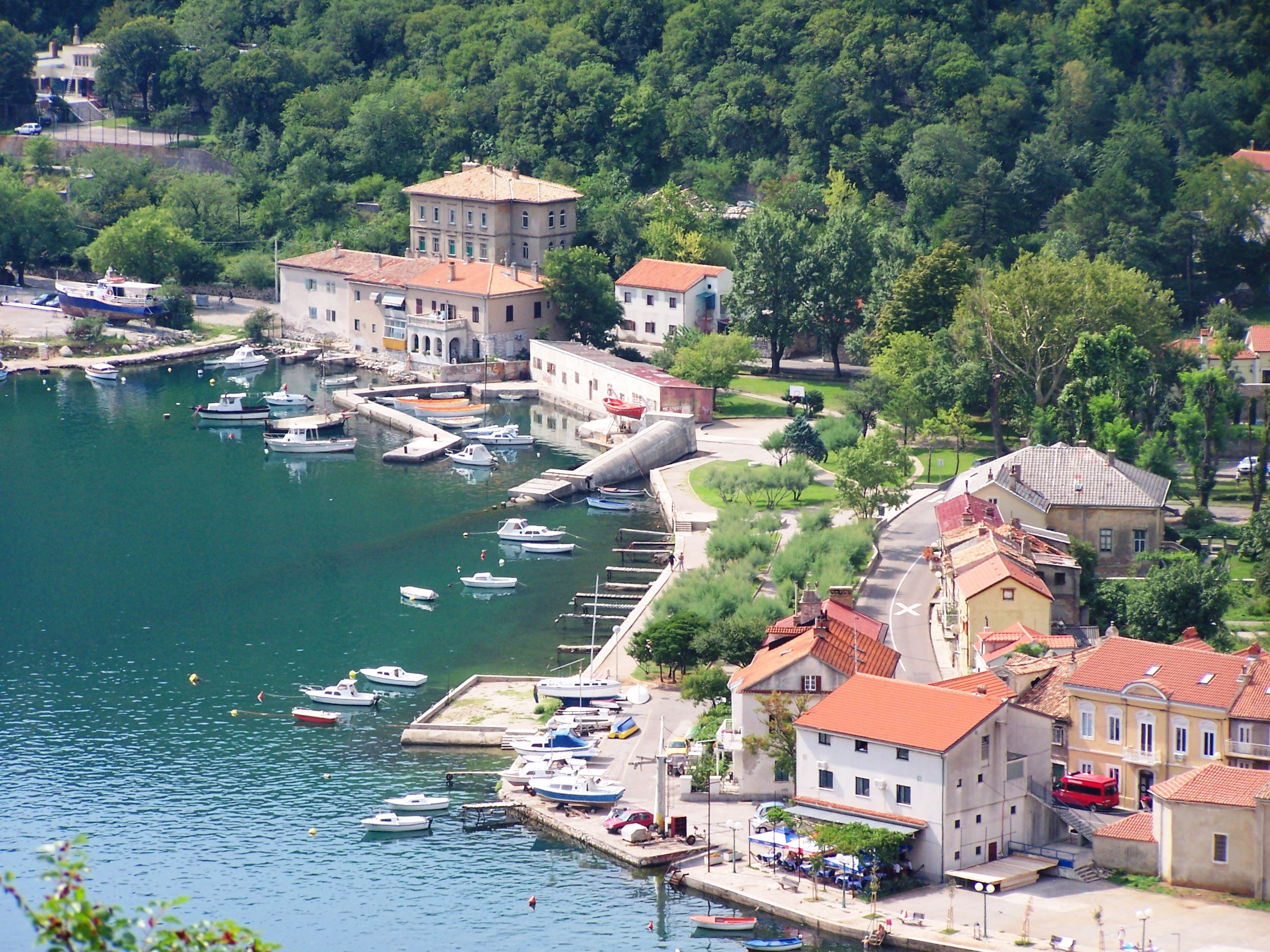
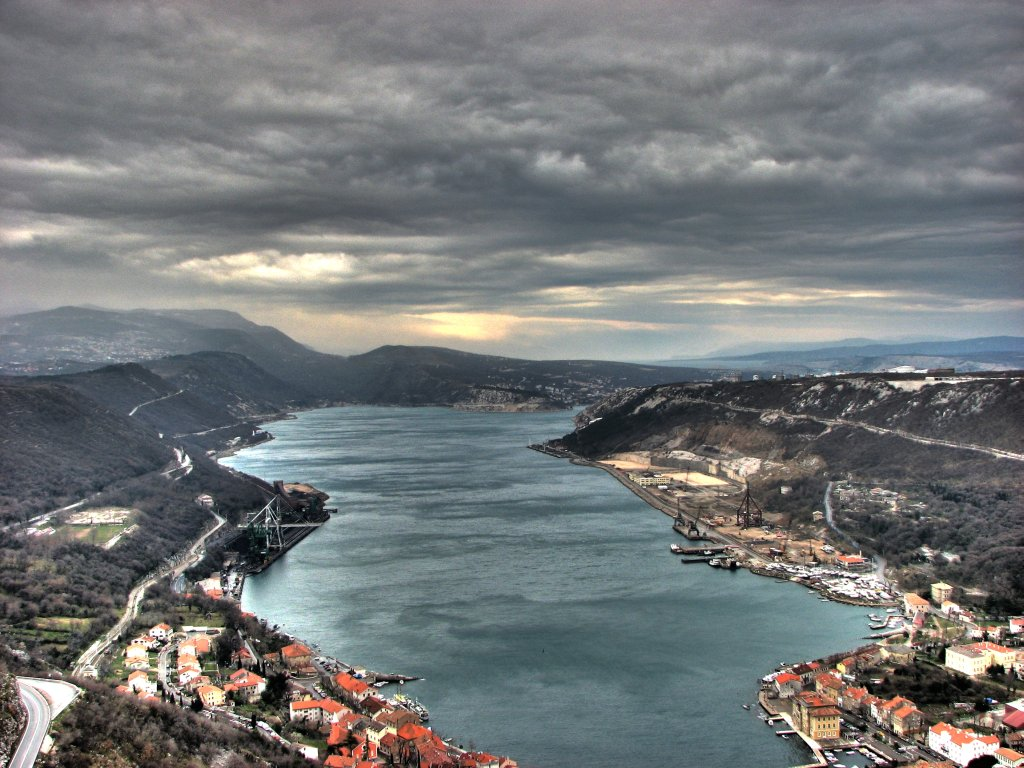

- Flag Coat of arms

- Location within Croatia
- Coordinates: 45°19′40″N 14°32′10″E
- Country: Croatia
- Region: Central Croatia (Croatian Littoral)
- County: Primorje-Gorski Kotar County
- Settled: 1st century
- Named: 1288
- Free city: May 13, 1798
- Royal Borough: April 23, 1799

Government
  - Mayor: Tomislav Klarić (HDZ)
  - City Council: 15 members: HDZ (10); _; SDP-HSU-HSS (3); _; Independents (1); _; Independents (1)

Area
  - Town: 125.5 km^{2} (48.5 sq mi)
  - Urban: 3.0 km^{2} (1.2 sq mi)

Population (2021)
  - Town: 7,573
  - Density: 60.34/km^{2} (156.3/sq mi)
  - Urban: 1,187
  - Urban density: 400/km^{2} (1,000/sq mi)
- Time zone: UTC+1 (CET)
  - Summer (DST): UTC+2 (CEST)
- Area code: 051
- Website: bakar.hr

Bakar is a town in the Primorje-Gorski Kotar County in western Croatia. The population of the town was 8,279 according to the 2011 Croatian census, including 1,473 in the titular settlement. Ninety percent of the population declared themselves Croats by ethnicity. The largest ethnic minority are the Serbs with 2.91% of the population. The old part of Bakar is situated on a hill overlooking the Bay of Bakar. Bakar is the Croatian word for "copper".

Bakar is a port for bulk cargo and used to be known for its industrial complex that included a coke factory, which produced a considerable amount of pollution. Bakar's coke factory was closed in 1995 and the area's pollution has subsided significantly. The historical core of Bakar was registered as a cultural monument in 1968.

== Settlements ==
There are 9 settlements in the Municipality of Bakar and they include (population as of 2021):

- Bakar, population 1187 ▼
- Hreljin, population 2139 ▼
- Krasica, population 1325 ▼
- Kukuljanovo, population 870 ▼
- Plosna, population 46 ▼
- Ponikve, population 44 ▲
- Praputnjak, population 532 ▼
- Škrljevo, population 1158 ▼
- Zlobin, population 272 ▼

== Climate ==
Since records began in 1997, the highest temperature recorded at the local weather station was 39.0 °C (102.2 °F), on 19 July 2007. The coldest temperature was −9.5 °C (14.9 °F), on 3 February 2012.

== Demographics ==
In 1895, the Bakar held the status of "city" (Croatian: grad), with an area of 3.3995 square kilometres (1.3126 mi^{2}), belonging directly to the županija of Modruš-Rijeka (Ogulin court and financial board). There were 408 houses, with a population of 1950. Its 3 villages hamlets were encompassed for taxation purposes by a single porezna obćina. The city had no statistical markets.

In 1910, the court of Bakar encompassed an area of 143 square kilometres (55 mi^{2}), with a population of 12,929. Bakar had its own cadastral jurisdiction and business court.

Grad Bakar: Population trends 1857–2021
v

population	11497	10401	10022	9977	9804	9603	10137	8658	6953	7079	7788	8008	7469	7577	7773	8279	7573
	1857	1869	1880	1890	1900	1910	1921	1931	1948	1953	1961	1971	1981	1991	2001	2011	2021

Sources: Croatian Bureau of Statistics publications

== Coat of arms ==
Bakar was granted its coat of arms and town privileges in 1799 by Francis II, Holy Roman Emperor. The coat of arms was in the artistic style typical for the period, with a cartouche with large landscapes and ornamentation around the shield within a circular inscription.

The shield of the coat of arms features a red-and-white checkered top or "chief", with three local gray stone castles on green hills in the middle, and a black anchor on orange at the bottom.

== Recognizable buildings ==
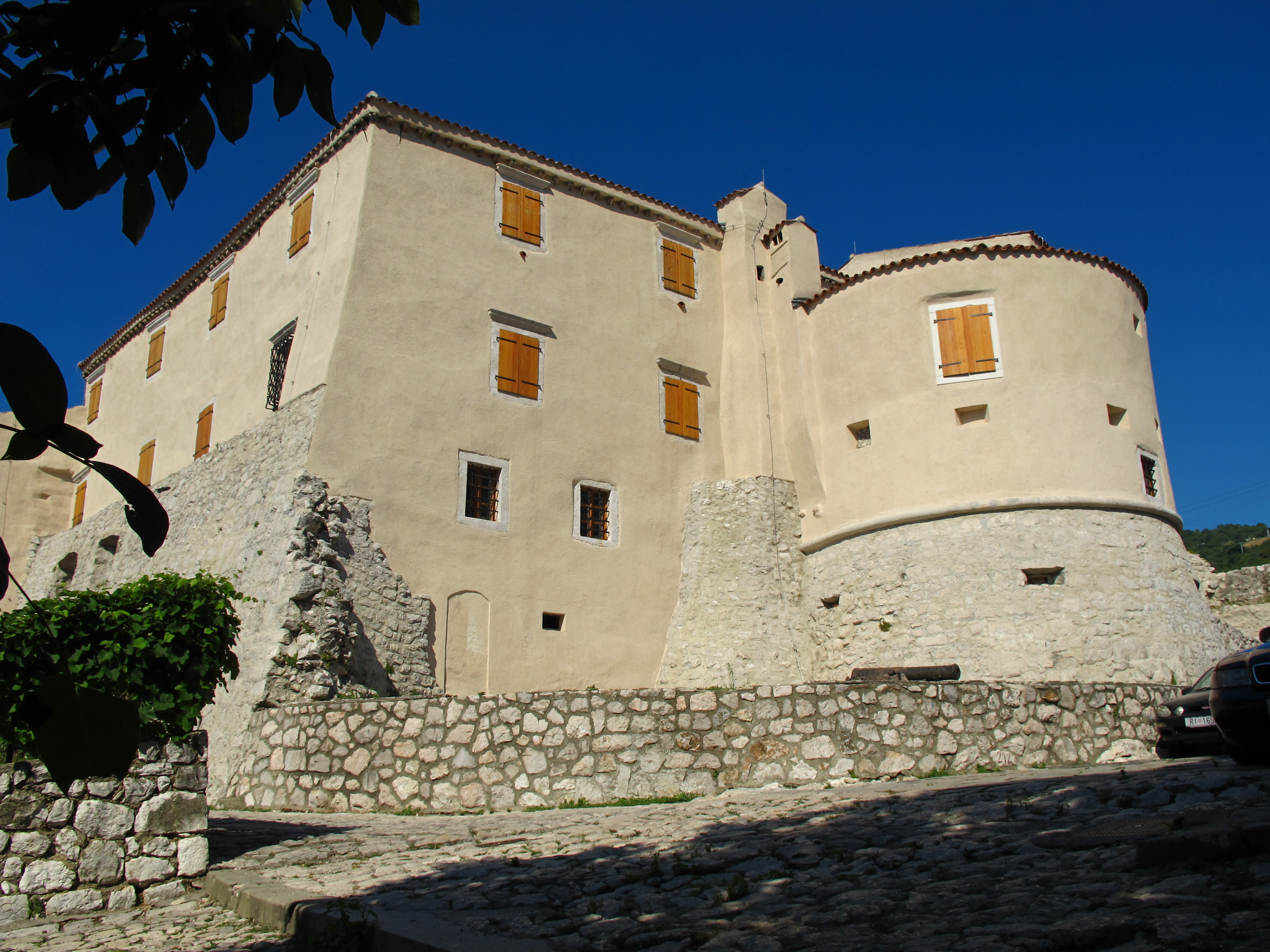
Bakar Fort

- Turkish house: built by an unknown architect, possibly in the 14th century, this peculiar building resembles Ottoman architecture. Following its 1965 reconstruction, the house served as an artistic atelier.
- Roman house: former monastery, built in the 18th century
- Parish church of St. Andrew the Apostle: originally built in the 12th century and destroyed in 1323 by earthquake. In the Middle Ages its catacombs were used for wealthy people to hide from plague that passed the city. It is the third largest late Baroque church in Croatia.
- Kaštel (Castel): A castle built in the 16th century by the order of Emperor Ferdinand I and used as a protection against the Turks. It has three kitchens, two dungeons, little chapel of St. Michael, and many other rooms.

== History ==
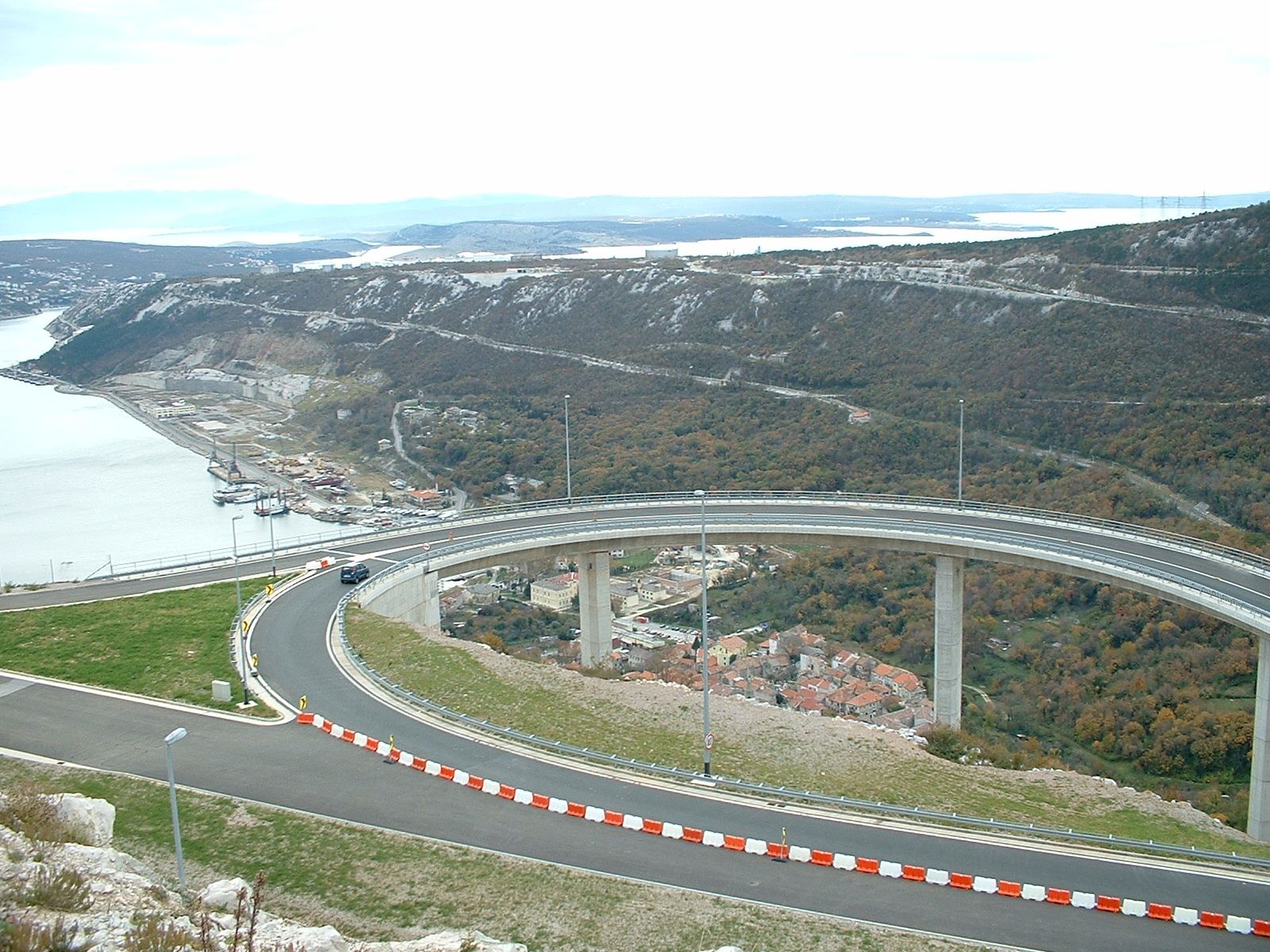
Roads above the town

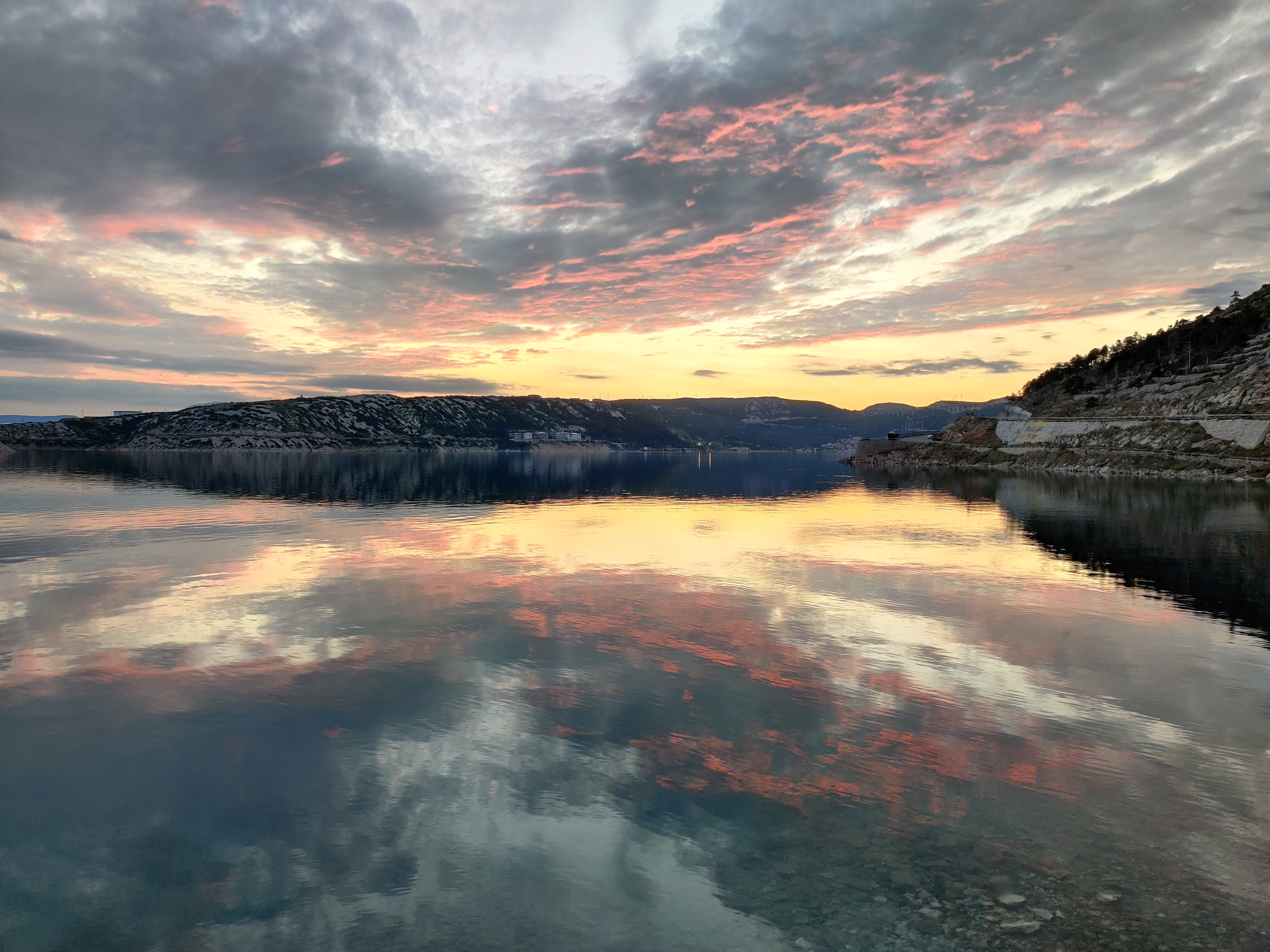
Port of Urinj INA Refinery in Bakar

In 1607 and 1608, Nikola VI Zrinski complained to the Slavonian Sabor about certain violent acts committed by the soldiers of Senj in the Bay of Bakar, where they plundered and wrecked two ships loaded with oil and grain.

In 1616, Venetian vessels had attempted to invade Bakar but was repelled by the local population with reinforcements from Rijeka

In July 1876, a savings bank opened in Bakar. It competed with the savings bank in Kraljevica (established 1873), forcing it into bankruptcy in 1878.

In the late 19th and early 20th century, Bakar was a district capital in the Modruš-Rijeka County of the Kingdom of Croatia-Slavonia.

=== World War I ===
In February 1918, during World War I, Gabriele D'Annunzio and Costanzo Ciano took part in a daring, if militarily irrelevant, naval raid on the harbour of Bakar (known in Italy as La beffa di Buccari, lit. "The Bakar mockery"), helping to raise the spirits of the Italian public.

After WWI, from the end of 1920, Bakar was one of the major points of entry of thousands of Russian refugees, arriving in the Kingdom of SHS following the end of the Russian Civil War in the European part of the former Russian Empire, mostly from Crimea, after the final defeat of White armies under general Wrangel there in November 1920.

=== Kingdom of Yugoslavia ===
In 1930, an HKD Napredak branch was founded in Bakar.

=== World War II ===
During WW II, in Bakar was an Italian concentration camp, where civil population from Province of Ljubljana, as well as Croats and Serbs was interned. It the peak, there was 893 internees.

=== Recent ===
The last two days of November 2008, the maximum wave height at Bakar reached 117 centimetres (46 in) above the average sea level, higher than ever recorded since records began there in 1929. Little rain fell, but the city was flooded anyway thanks to a strong sirocco wind. Firefighters had to pump water from basements and the HEP had to repair broken power lines.

== Trivia ==
In 1972 director Radley Metzger filmed his movie Score in Bakar, Croatia.

== Bibliography ==
=== Dialectology ===
- Brabec, Ivan (1966). "Mješoviti govori na sjevernoj periferiji hrvatskosrpskog jezika". Ljetopis Jugoslavenske akademije znanosti i umjetnosti. 77: 421–425. ISSN 0373-9902.

=== History ===
- Matić, Zdravko (2004-12-22). "Osnivanje i rad "Napretkovih" organizacija na području Hrvatskog primorja i Gorskog kotara (1928. - 1950.)" [The Foundation and Work of "Napredak" Organisations on the Territory of Hrvatsko Primorje and Gorski Kotar]. Časopis za suvremenu povijest (in Croatian). 36 (3): 1183–1204. ISSN 1848-9079.
- Laszowski, Emilij (1923). "Bakar". Gorski kotar i Vinodol: Dio državine knezova Frankopana i Zrinskih (Mjestopisne i povjesne crtice) (PDF). Zagreb: Matica hrvatska, 🖶 Tiskara "Narodnih novina" (published 1924-01-12). pp. 117–150. Archived from the original (PDF) on 2023-08-12. Online publication 2016-01-09.
