= Bay of Bakar =

Body of water in Croatia

- Bakarski zaliv (Croatian)
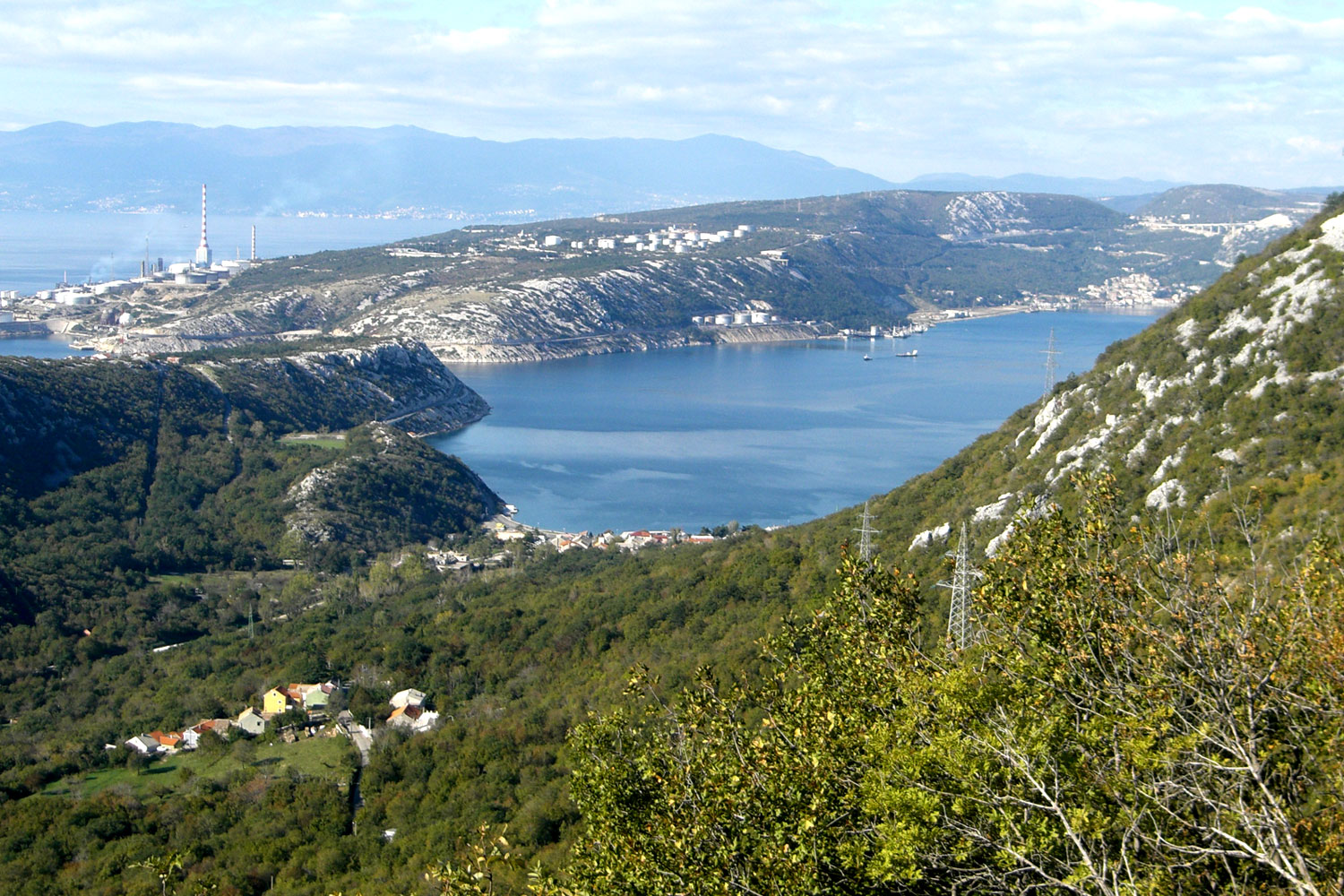
- Bay of Bakar, Croatia, seen from the east
- Interactive map of Bay of Bakar
- Location: Croatia
- Coordinates: 45°17′30″N 14°33′38″E
- Type: Bay
- Etymology: Bakar, Croatia
- Ocean/sea sources: Adriatic Sea
- Max. length: 4,700 m (4.7 km; 2.9 mi)
- Max. width: 700 m (0.70 km; 0.43 mi)
- Average depth: 26 m (85 ft)
- Max. depth: 44 m (144 ft)
- Surface elevation: 171 m (561 ft)
- Settlements: Bakar and Kraljevica

The Bay of Bakar is located on the Croatian Adriatic coast, within the Gulf of Kvarner. There are two towns centered on bay of Bakar: Bakar and Kraljevica. While Bakar and Kraljevica are port towns, in outback of bay of Bakar there are the industry zones and free zones of Kukuljanovo. The bay itself contains Bulk Cargo Terminal of the Port of Rijeka, handling coal, iron ore and bulk cargo. Its annual capacity is 4 million tonnes and it accommodates Capesize ships. The port facilities are planned to be expanded through construction of a car terminal in the bay.

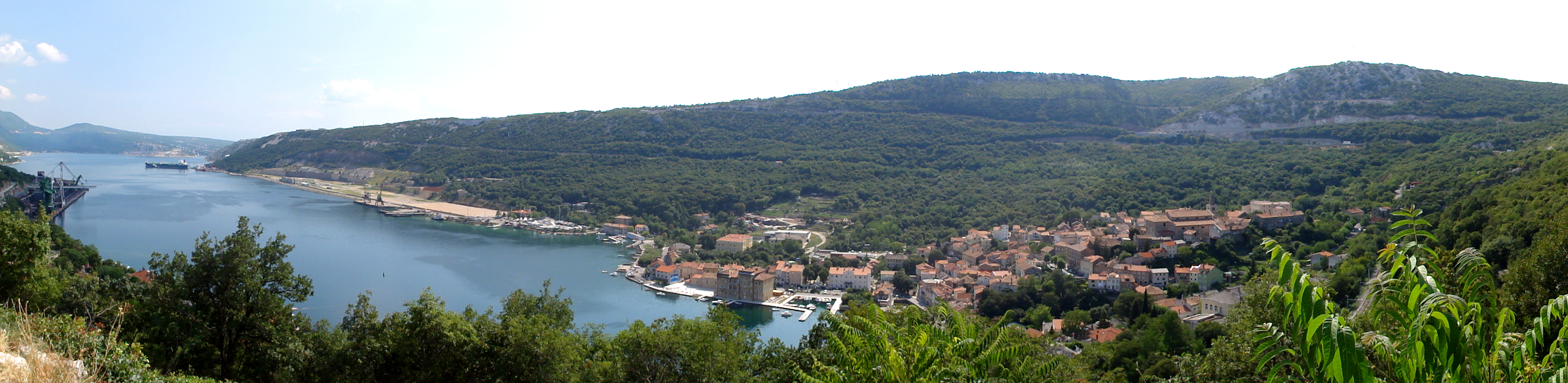
Panoramic view on the town Bakar and Bay of Bakar.
