= Kukuljanovo =

Coordinates: 45°20′N 14°32′E

- Village
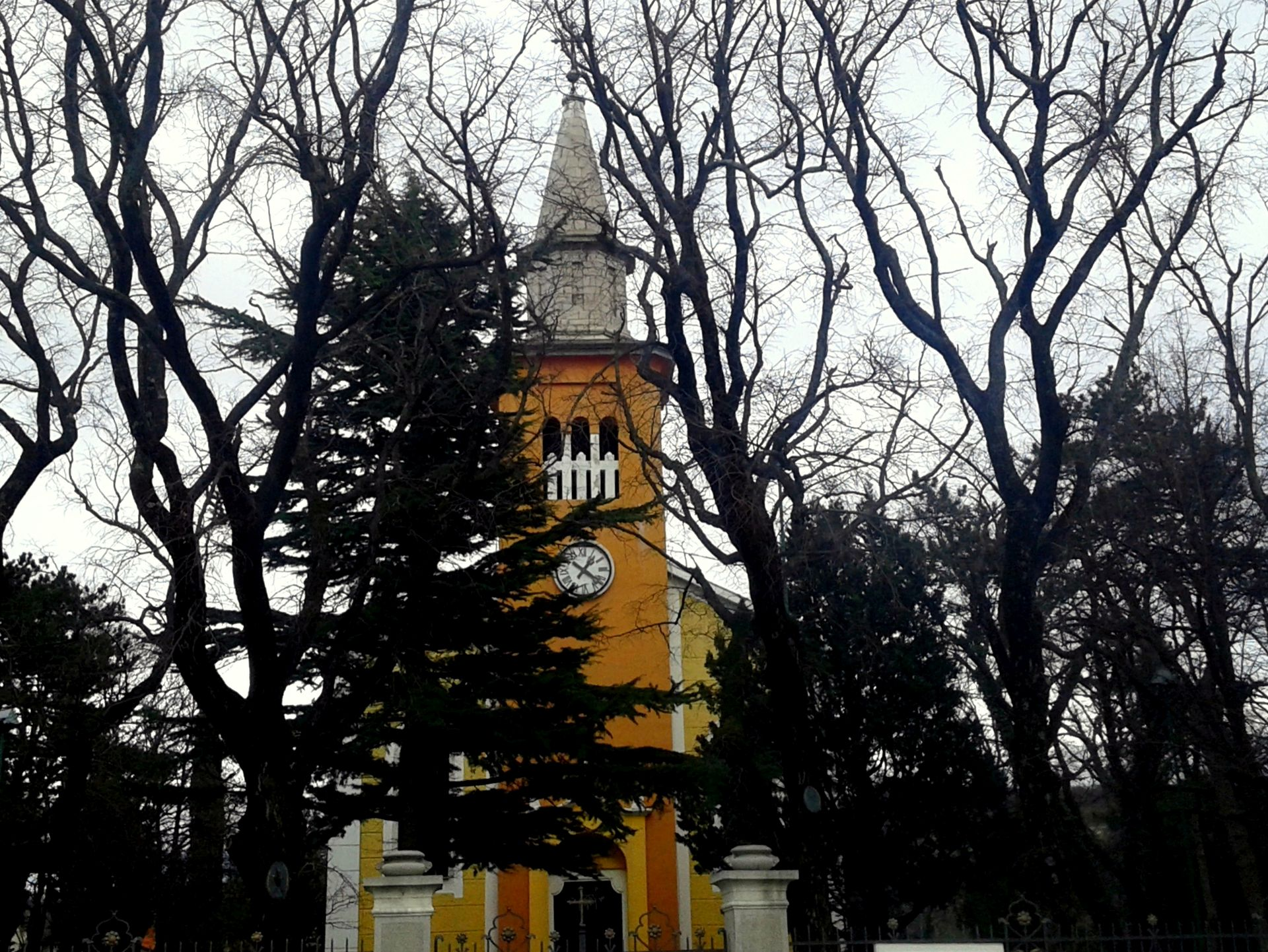
- Church
- Interactive map of Kukuljanovo
- Country: Croatia
- Region: Central Croatia (Croatian Littoral)
- County: Primorje-Gorski Kotar

Area
  - Total: 2.7 sq mi (7.0 km^{2})
- Elevation: 804 ft (245 m)

Population (2021)
  - Total: 870
  - Density: 320/sq mi (120/km^{2})
- Time zone: UTC+1 (CET)
  - Summer (DST): UTC+2 (CEST)
- Postal code: 51227

Kukuljanovo is a village in Croatia. Kukuljanovo is home to one of the largest industrial zones in Croatia. In the hinterland of Kukuljanovo are the picturesque villages of Plosna and Ponikve.

== Climate ==
Since records began in 1997, the highest temperature recorded at the local weather station was 40.0 °C (104.0 °F), on 19 July 2007. The coldest temperature was −10.6 °C (12.9 °F), on 26 February 2018.

== Gallery ==
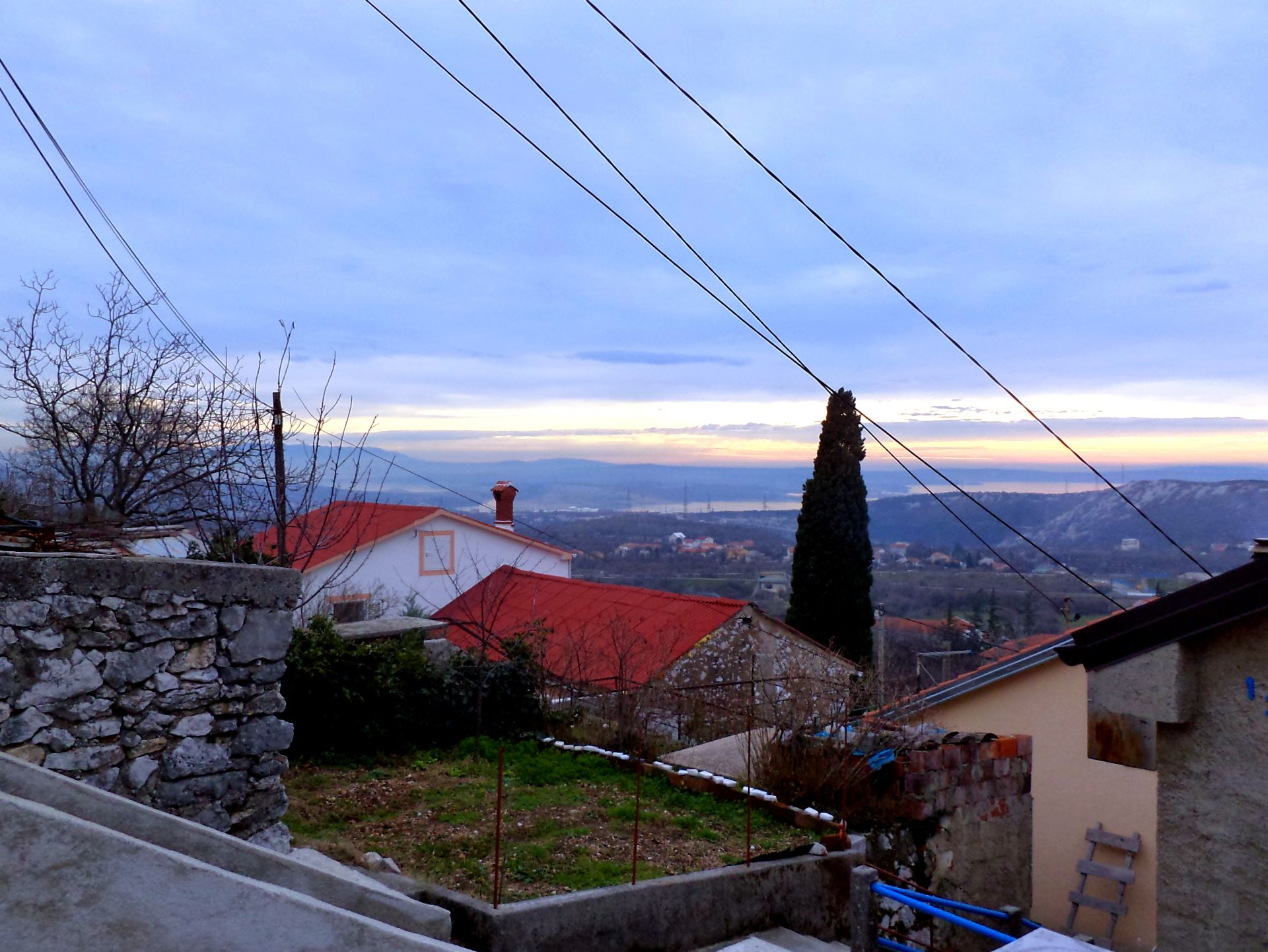
View of Krk

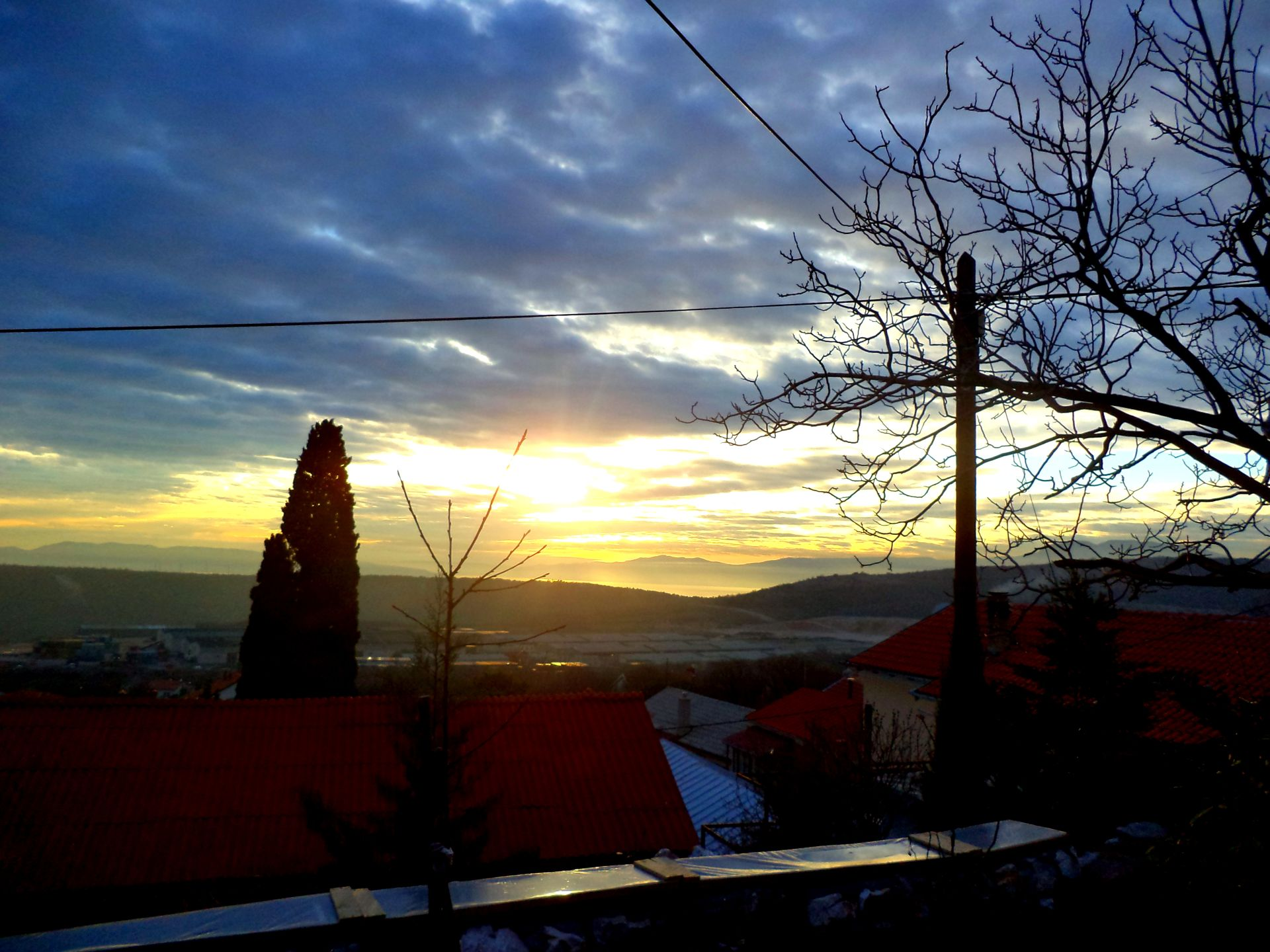
View of Kvarner Gulf
