= 26th Infantry Regiment "Bergamo" =

Inactive Italian Army infantry unit

- 26° Reggimento Fanteria "Bergamo"
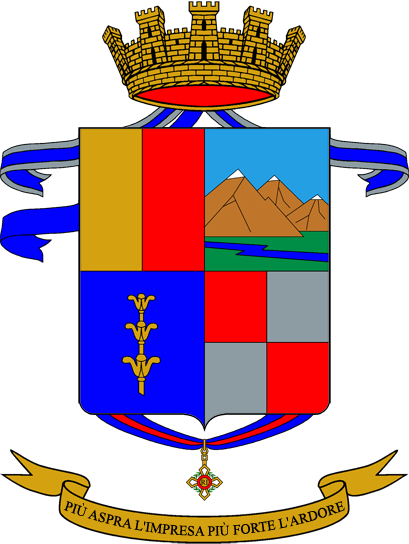
- Regimental coat of arms
- Active: 1 Nov. 1859 – 27 Sept. 1943; 15 Nov. 1975 – 26 Jan. 1999
- Country: Italy
- Branch: Italian Army
- Part of: 3rd Army Corps
- Garrison/HQ: Pesaro
- Motto: "Più aspra l'impresa più forte l'ardore"
- Anniversaries: 26 May 1917 – Battle of Flondar
- Decorations: 1× Military Order of Italy; 2× Silver Medals of Military Valor; 1× Bronze Medal of Military Valor

Insignia
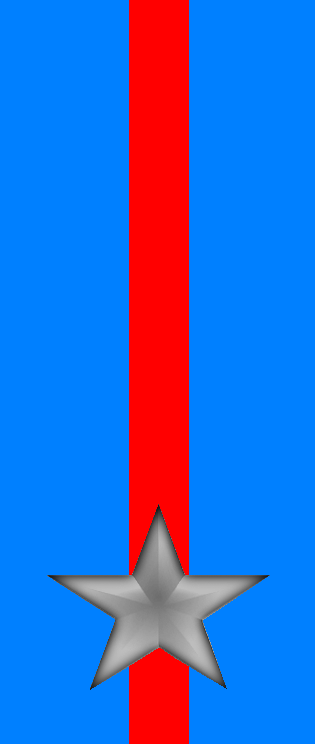
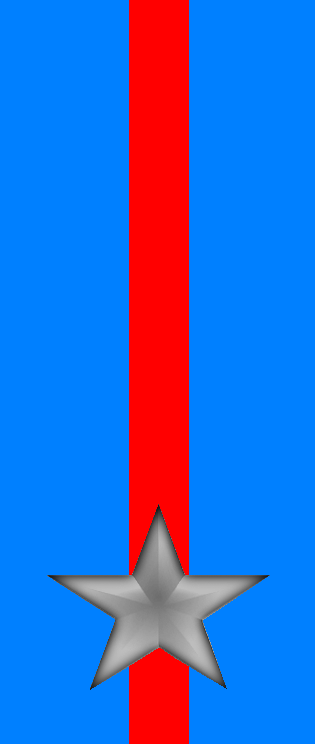
- Regimental gorget patches

The 26th Infantry Regiment "Bergamo" (Italian: 26° Reggimento Fanteria "Bergamo") is an inactive unit of the Italian Army last based in Diano Castello in Liguria. The regiment is named for the city of Bergamo and part of the Italian Army's infantry arm. The regiment was formed in 1859 by the Royal Sardinian Army and one year later participated in the Sardinian campaign in central and southern Italy. In 1866, the regiment fought in the Third Italian War of Independence and in 1911–12 in the Italo-Turkish War. During World War I the regiment fought on the Italian front.

During World War II, the regiment was assigned to the 15th Infantry Division "Bergamo", with which it fought in the Invasion of Yugoslavia. Afterwards the division remained in Dalmatia in occupied Yugoslavia on anti-partisan duty. After the announcement of the Armistice of Cassibile on 8 September 1943, the division fought German forces, which by 27 September overcame the "Bergamo" division's resistance and disbanded it.

In 1975, the regiment's flag and traditions were assigned to the 26th Infantry Battalion "Bergamo", which trained recruits destined for the Armored Division "Centauro". In 1986, the battalion was transferred to the Northwestern Military Region and in 1991, to the Motorized Brigade "Cremona". In 1993, the regiment was reformed. In 1999, the regiment was disbanded and the flag of the 26th Infantry Regiment "Bergamo" transferred to the Shrine of the Flags in the Vittoriano in Rome. The regiment's anniversary falls on 26 May 1917, the last day of the Tenth Battle of the Isonzo, during which the regiment captured the hill of Flondar, for which the regiment was awarded a Silver Medal of Military Valor.

== History ==
=== Formation ===
In fall 1859, after the Second Italian War of Independence, the armies of the Second French Empire and the Kingdom of Sardinia occupied Lombard part of the Kingdom of Lombardy–Venetia, as well as the Duchy of Modena and Reggio, the Duchy of Parma and Piacenza, and the Papal Legations of the Romagne. On 1 November 1859, the Royal Sardinian Army formed eight new infantry regiments to garrison the occupied territories. Each existing infantry regiment, with the exception of the 1st Infantry Regiment and 2nd Infantry Regiment of the Brigade "Re", ceded its III Battalion and three depot companies with recruits, to help form the new infantry regiments. Consequently on 1 November 1859, the 15th Infantry Regiment and 16th Infantry Regiment of the Brigade "Savona" ceded their III Battalion and three depot companies to form the 25th Infantry Regiment, while the 17th Infantry Regiment and 18th Infantry Regiment of the Brigade "Acqui" ceded their III Battalion and three depot companies to form the 26th Infantry Regiment. On the same day the Brigade "Bergamo" was formed and the 25th and 25th infantry regiments assigned to it. The brigade was then sent to garrison the Papal Legations of the Romagne.

On 1 March 1860, the 25th Infantry Regiment and 26th Infantry Regiment ceded each one of their companies to help form the 27th Infantry Regiment (Brigade "Pavia"), and the 26th Infantry Regiment ceded two additional companies to help form the 28th Infantry Regiment (Brigade "Pavia"). On 5 May 1860, Giuseppe Garibaldi's Expedition of the Thousand set off, with the support of the Sardinian government, from Genoa and landed on 11 May in Marsala in Sicily. On 15 May 1860, Garibaldi won the Battle of Calatafimi and the Sardinian government decided to send reinforcements to Sicily. This triggered the Sardinian campaign in central and southern Italy, durich which the Brigade "Bergamo", together with the Brigade "Como", was assigned to the 7th Division. During the campaign, the Brigade "Bergamo" fought in the Battle of Castelfidardo, the Siege of Ancona, the Battle of San Giuliano, and the Siege of Gaeta. For their conduct during the Siege of Gaeta, the two regiments of the Brigade "Bergamo" were both awarded a Silver Medal of Military Valor. The medals were affixed to the regiments' flags and added to their coat of arms.

After the successful conclusion of Garibaldi's Expedition of the Thousand the Kingdom of Sardinia annexed the Kingdom of the Two Sicilies and most of the Papal Legations. On 17 March 1861, King Victor Emmanuel II proclaimed himself King of Italy.

=== Third Italian War of Independence ===
On 16 April 1861, the 25th Infantry Regiment and 26th Infantry Regiment ceded each one battalion to help form the 54th Infantry Regiment (Brigade "Umbria"). On 1 August 1862, the 25th Infantry Regiment and 26th Infantry Regiment ceded their 17th Company and 18th Company to help form the 65th Infantry Regiment (Brigade "Valtellina"). In 1866, the Brigade "Bergamo" participated in the Third Italian War of Independence. On 25 October 1871, the brigade level was abolished, and the two regiments of the Brigade "Bergamo" were renamed 25th Infantry Regiment "Bergamo", respectively 26th Infantry Regiment "Bergamo". On 2 January 1881, the brigade level was reintroduced, and the two regiments were renamed again as 25th Infantry Regiment (Brigade "Bergamo") and 26th Infantry Regiment (Brigade "Bergamo"). On 1 November 1884, the 26th Infantry Regiment ceded some of its companies to help form the 82nd Infantry Regiment (Brigade "Torino"). In 1895–96, the regiment provided ten officers and 270 enlisted for units deployed to Italian Eritrea for the First Italo-Ethiopian War.

=== Italo-Turkish War ===
In 1911, the 26th Infantry Regiment was deployed to Libya for the Italo-Turkish War. The regiment landed in Derna and operated in Cyrenaica. On 3 March 1912, the regiment distinguished itself in combat near Derna, and was awarded a Bronze Medal of Military Valor, which was affixed to the regiment's flag and added to the regiment's coat of arms. In 1913–14, the regiment remained in Libya and fought against local rebels.

=== World War I ===
At the outbreak of World War I, the Brigade "Bergamo" formed, together with the Brigade "Valtellina" and the 21st Field Artillery Regiment, the 7th Division. At the time the 26th Infantry Regiment consisted of three battalions, each of which fielded four fusilier companies and one machine gun section. On 15 March 1915, the depot of the 26th Infantry Regiment in Piacenza formed the a battalion for the newly formed 111th Infantry Regiment, which was assigned on the same date to the newly formed Brigade "Piacenza". On 24 May 1915, the day after Italy's entry into the war, the brigade, together with the 5th Bersaglieri Regiment, operated in the Tolmin sector on the Isonzo river, where the two units were tasked with taking the Austrian positions on the hills of Bučenica and Mengore on the right bank of the Isonzo river. After a series of probing attacks the brigade, together with the Brigade "Valtellina" and 5th Bersaglieri Regiment, attacked Bučenica in force on 16 August 1915, but the attacks collapsed due to the heavy Austro-Hungarian Army fortifications and artillery fire. In these attacks the brigade had suffered more than 1,600 casualties. On 18 October 1915, during the Third Battle of the Isonzo, the brigade renewed its attacks on Bučenica, but after the brigade suffered 1,900 casualties the attacks were again called off. On 10 November 1915, the Fourth Battle of the Isonzo of began and this time the brigade attacked Mengore and suffered another 1,100 casualties for no territorial gains. By the end of the year the Brigade "Bergamo" had suffered more than 5,700 casualties on Bučenica and Mengore and the 5th Bersaglieri Regiment had suffered 1,100 casualties.

In 1916, the brigade remained in the Tolmin sector, but did not undertake any further attacks against the Austro-Hungarian positions of Bučenica and Mengore. On 22 November 1916, the brigade was taken out of the front at Tolmin. On 15 December 1916, the brigade was assigned the trenches on Debeli Vrh, where it remained until 10 May 1917. In February 1917 the infantry regiments of the Brigade "Bergamo" ceded both two companies to help from the infantry regiments of the newly formed Brigade "Murge". On 23 May, during the Tenth Battle of the Isonzo the brigade was on the Karst plateau, and tasked with attacking Flondar hill. After three days of heavy combat, which cost the brigade more than 2,700 casualties, the brigade took the hill, which was subsequently lost again during the Battle of Flondar. On 15 July 1917, the depot of the 26th Infantry Regiment in Piacenza formed the command of the Brigade "Foggia" and the 280th Infantry Regiment, which was assigned to the new brigade. On 17–21 August 1917, during the Eleventh Battle of the Isonzo, the brigade attacked from Miren towards Orehovlje, where it suffered 1,600 casualties in 5 days. After a brief pause the brigade resumed its attacks on 27 August towards the hill of Markov hrib, which cost the brigade another 500 casualties for no gain.

On 24 October 1917, Austro-Hungarian forces, reinforced by German units, commenced the Battle of Caporetto. The German forces were able to break into the Italian front line at Caporetto and rout the Italian forces opposing them. The breakthrough forced the Italian 3rd Army to retreat westwards behind the Piave river. However, due to the rapid advance of the Austro-Hungarian and German forces towards the Venetian Plain, the 3rd Army's line of retreat was in danger of being cut off and encircled. To keep the 3rd Army's path to the Tagliamento river bridges at Codroipo and at Latisana open the II Cavalry Brigade and the Brigade "Bergamo" were sent to Pozzuolo del Friuli and ordered to delay the enemy. The cavalry units arrived in Pozzuolo in the late afternoon of 29 October, while the Brigade "Bergamo" arrived at noon on 30 October 1917. The commanders of the two brigades decided that the II Battalion of the 25th Infantry Regiment and III Battalion of the 26th Infantry Regiment would defend Pozzuolo, while the "Lancieri di Novara" would cover the left and the "Genova Cavalleria" the right flank of Pozzuolo. The remainder of the Brigade "Bergamo" would continue to Carpeneto and block the road to Codroipo there.

By 14h the Italians were under attack by three enemy divisions: the German 5th Infantry Division attacked Carpeneto, while the Austrio-Hungarian 60th Infantry Division attacked Pozzuolo, and the German 117th Infantry Division attacked the "Genova Cavalleria". At 18h the cavalry troops were ordered to disengage and retreat, while the "Bergamo" battalions stayed in Pozzuolo to cover the retreat. Fifteen minutes later the remnants of the II Cavalry Brigade rode in formation south towards San Maria di Sclaunicco. On 30 October 1917, the II Cavalry Brigade lost 467 of its 968 men, while the Brigade "Bergamo" lost 3,500 men, but the Battle of Pozzuolo bought the Italian 3rd Army enough time to escape across the Tagliamento river.

After the few survivors of the Brigade "Bergamo" crossed the Piave river, the brigade was sent to the rear to be rebuilt. On 8 December 1917, the brigade was sent to the Asiago plateau, where it remained until 22 March 1918. On 15 June 1918, at the beginning of the Second Battle of the Piave River, the brigade was held in reserve until 17 June, when it was sent to Monastier, where Austro-Hungarian forces had managed to cross the Piave river and establish a bridgehead. By 20 June, the brigade had stopped the enemy's advance at the cost of 1,000 casualties. On 25 June, the Austro-Hungarian forces retreated back over the Piave river. In October 1917, during the decisive Battle of Vittorio Veneto was deployed on the Asiago plateau, where it occupied Austro-Hungarian positions after the enemy had retreated.

For its conduct during the war, especially on Bučenica, at Orehovlje, in Pozzuolo, and during the Second Battle of the Piave River, the 26th Infantry Regiment was awarded a Silver Medal of Military Valor, which was affixed to the regiment's flag and added to its coat of arms.

=== Interwar years ===
In 1919, the Brigade "Bergamo" was sent to Libya to help pacify the country. In 1923, the 25th Infantry Regiment moved from Piacenza to Poreč in Istria, while the 26th Infantry Regiment moved from Piacenza to Rijeka. On 20 October 1926, the command of the Brigade "Bergamo" and the 25th Infantry Regiment were disbanded. The two battalions of the disbanded regiment were transferred to the 26th Infantry Regiment, which was renamed on the same date 26th Infantry Regiment "Bergamo", and to the 152nd Infantry Regiment "Sassari". The 26th Infantry Regiment "Bergamo" was then assigned to the XV Infantry Brigade, which had been formed by renaming the Brigade "Lombardia" and consisted of the 73rd Infantry Regiment "Lombardia" and 74th Infantry Regiment "Lombardia". The XV Infantry Brigade was the infantry component of the 15th Territorial Division of Pola, which also included the 4th Field Artillery Regiment.

In 1934, the 15th Territorial Division of Pola was renamed 15th Infantry Division "Carnaro". A name change that also extended to the division's infantry brigade. In 1935–36 the 26th Infantry Regiment "Bergamo" provided 20 officers and 205 troops to units deployed to East Africa for the Second Italo-Ethiopian War. On 24 May 1939, the 73rd Infantry Regiment "Lombardia" in Rijeka changed its name to 25th Infantry Regiment "Bergamo", while the 12th Infantry Regiment "Casale" of the 12th Infantry Division "Sassari" in Trieste changed its name to 73rd Infantry Regiment "Lombardia". On the same date the 15th Infantry Division "Carnaro" was renamed 15th Infantry Division "Bergamo" and ceded the 74th Infantry Regiment "Lombardia" to the newly activated 57th Infantry Division "Lombardia". Furthermore on the same day the XV Infantry Brigade "Carnaro" was disbanded, and the 25th Infantry Regiment "Bergamo" and 26th Infantry Regiment "Bergamo" came under direct command of the division, while the 4th Field Artillery Regiment was renamed 4th Artillery Regiment "Bergamo".

=== World War II ===
At the outbreak of World War II, the 26th Infantry Regiment "Bergamo" consisted of a command, a command company, three fusilier battalions, a support weapons battery equipped with 65/17 infantry support guns, and a mortar company equipped with 81mm Mod. 35 mortars. On 6 April 1941, the "Bergamo" division participated in the invasion of Yugoslavia. On 11 April, the division broke through the Royal Yugoslav Army defences near Drenova and captured the Kastav hill the same day. On 12 April, the division reached Bakar and continued to advance South along the Dalmatian coast. On 16 April 1941 the division captured Žuta Lokva. After Yugoslavia's surrender the division remained in Dalmatia and garrisoned Makarska, Livno, Sinj, Ljubuški, Imotski and the island of Brač. In June 1942, the division suppressed a major Yugoslav partisan revolt in the Lika region. From 12 August to 2 September 1942, the division took part in the anti-partisan Operation Alba in Croatia, with the aim to destroy the partisan groups in the Biokovo east of Split. In 1943, the division was garrisoned in Split and fought increasingly bloody skirmishes with partisans in the surrounding areas.

In February 1942, the depots of the 25th and 26th infantry regiments in Rijeka formed the 277th Infantry Regiment "Vicenza" and 278th Infantry Regiment "Vicenza", which were assigned on 10 March 1942 to the newly formed 156th Infantry Division "Vicenza". On 8 September 1943, the Armistice of Cassibile was announced. As there were no orders from Rome as to how to proceed the "Bergamo" division's commander General Emilio Becuzzi dithered for three days and on 12 September decided to hand over the division's weapons to the Yugoslav partisans. On 23 September 1943, four ships arrived from Bari with weapons and materiel for the Yugoslav partisans. The ships then embarked some 3,000 Italian troops to evacuate them to Apulia and General Emilio Becuzzi boarded one of the ships and abandoned the remaining 8,000 men of his division. On 25 September 1943, the partisans left Split to avoid being encircled by the approaching German 7th SS Volunteer Mountain Division Prinz Eugen. On 27 September, the Germans took control of the city and disbanded the "Bergamo" division and all other Italian units in the city. On 1 and 2 October 1943, the Germans massacred 50 of the captured officers, as retribution for General Becuzzi's surrender of the division's weapons to the Yugoslav partisans. Among the murdered officers were General Alfonso Cigala Fulgosi, General Angelo Policardi, and General Salvatore Pelligra.

=== Cold War ===
During the 1975 army reform the army disbanded the regimental level and newly independent battalions were granted for the first time their own flags. On 1 August 1975, the I Battalion of the 157th Infantry Regiment "Liguria" became an autonomous unit and moved from Genoa to Diano Castello, where the battalion was used to form the Recruits Training Battalion "Centauro", which on 15 November 1975 was renamed 26th Infantry Battalion "Bergamo". The battalion was assigned to the Armored Division "Centauro" and trained the division's recruits. The battalion consisted of a command, a command platoon, and eight recruit companies, four of which were detached in Albenga. On 12 November 1976, the President of the Italian Republic Giovanni Leone assigned with decree 846 the flag and traditions of the 26th Infantry Regiment "Bergamo" to the 26th Infantry Battalion "Bergamo".

On 1 May 1977, the detachment of the 26th Infantry Battalion "Bergamo" in Albenga became an autonomous unit and was renamed 72nd Infantry Battalion "Puglie". Both battalions were assigned to the Armored Division "Centauro". In 1986, the Armored Division "Centauro" was disbanded and the 26th Infantry Battalion "Bergamo" transferred to the Northwestern Military Region. In 1988, the battalion's command platoon was expanded to command and services company.

=== Recent times ===
On 1 June 1991, the 26th Infantry Battalion "Bergamo" was transferred to the Mechanized Brigade "Cremona". On 2 November 1993, the 26th Infantry Battalion "Bergamo" lost its autonomy and the next day the battalion entered the reformed 26th Regiment "Bergamo". On 5 November 1996, the 26th Regiment "Bergamo" was transferred from the Mechanized Brigade "Cremona" to the 3rd Army Corps, as the brigade was scheduled to disband on 15 November 1996. On 16 September 1996, the regiment was transferred from the 3rd Army Corps to the Support Units Command "Legnano". On 31 December 1997, the Support Units Command "Legnano" was disbanded and regiment was transferred to the Projection Forces Command. On 26 January 1999, the 26th Regiment "Bergamo" was disbanded and the flag of the 26th Infantry Regiment "Bergamo" transferred to the Shrine of the Flags in the Vittoriano in Rome.
