= Giovanni Esposito =

Giovanni Esposito may refer to:

- Giovanni Esposito (comedian)
- Giovanni Esposito (general)
- Giovanni Esposito (judoka)
- Giani Esposito, also known as Giovanni, French actor and singer-songwriter
