= 57th Infantry Division "Lombardia" =

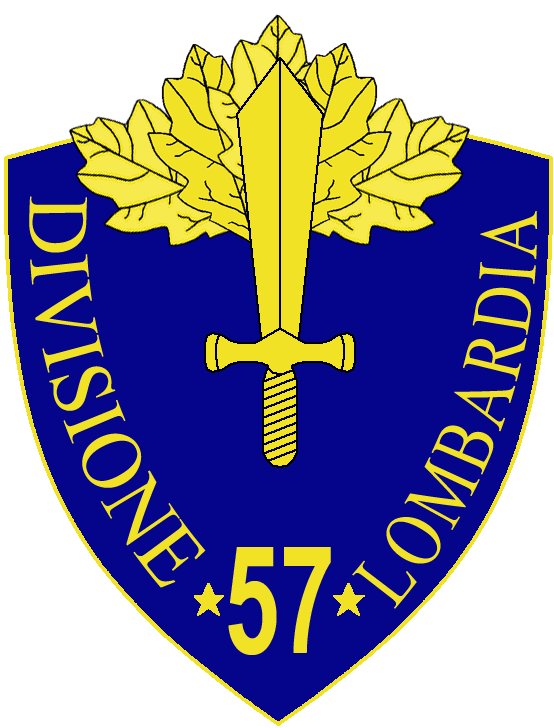
- 57th Infantry Division "Lombardia" insignia
- Active: 1939–1943
- Country: Kingdom of Italy
- Branch: Royal Italian Army
- Type: Infantry
- Size: Division
- Garrison/HQ: Pula
- Engagements: World War II; Battle of the Neretva

Commanders
- Notable commanders: General Giovanni Esposito

Insignia
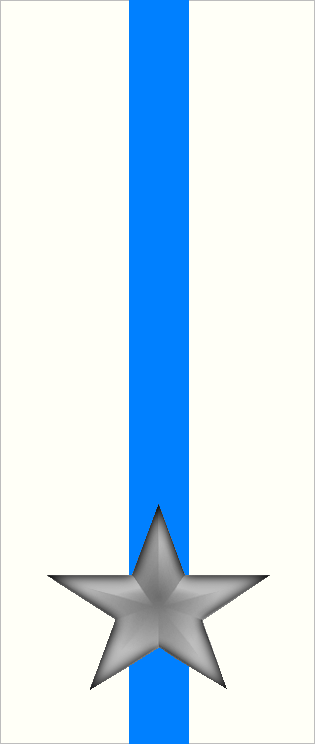
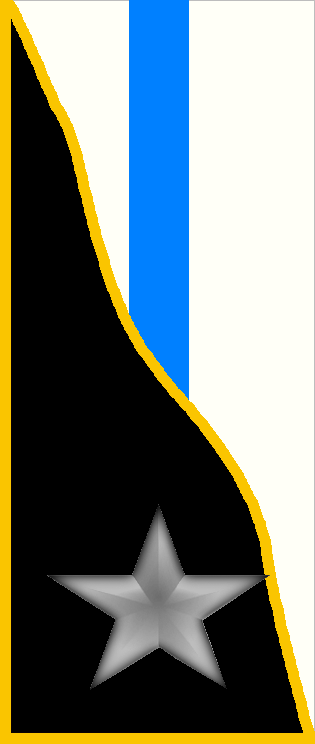
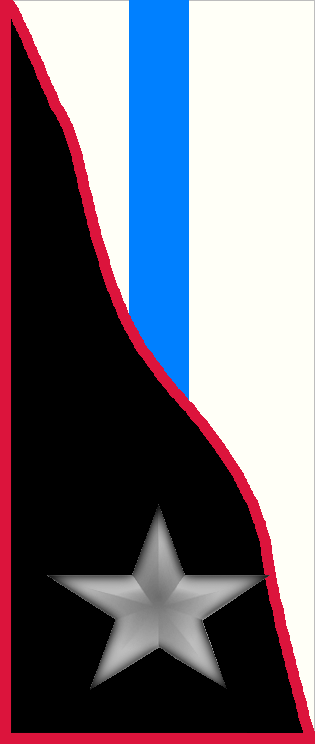
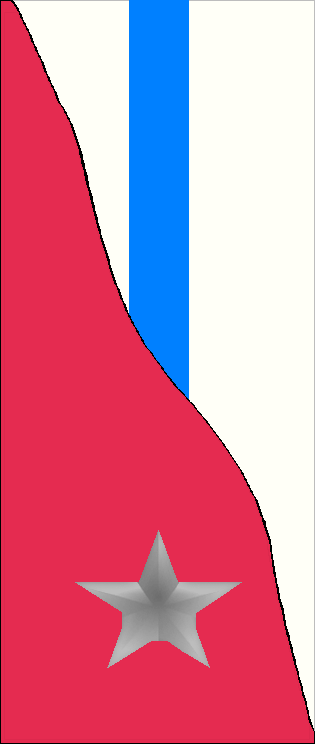
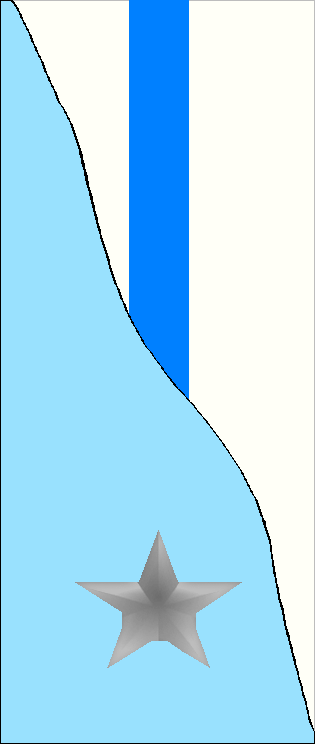
- Identification symbol: Lombardia Division gorget patches

The 57th Infantry Division "Lombardia" (Italian: 57ª Divisione di fanteria "Lombardia") was an infantry division of the Royal Italian Army during World War II. The Lombardia was formed on 24 May 1939 in Pula and named for the region of Lombardy. The division was disbanded by the Germans after the Armistice of Cassibile was announced on 8 September 1943.

== History ==
After the Second Italian War of Independence the Austrian Empire had to cede the Lombardy region of the Kingdom of Lombardy–Venetia to the Kingdom of Sardinia. After taking control of the region the government of Sardinia ordered on 29 August 1859 that the Royal Sardinian Army should raise five infantry brigades and one grenadier brigade in Lombardy. Subsequently on 1 November 1859 the Brigade "Granatieri di Lombardia" was activated with the newly raised 3rd and 4th grenadier regiments. On 5 March 1871 the brigade was assigned to the infantry and renamed Brigade "Lombardia". On the same date brigade's two regiments were renamed 73rd Infantry Regiment and 74th Infantry Regiment.

=== World War I ===
The brigade fought on the Italian front in World War I. On 20 October 1926 the brigade assumed the name of XV Infantry Brigade and received the 26th Infantry Regiment "Bergamo" from the disbanded Brigade "Bergamo". The XV Infantry Brigade was the infantry component of the 15th Territorial Division of Pola, which also included the 4th Artillery Regiment. On 25 January 1930 the division moved to Volosko and consequently changed its name to 15th Territorial Division of Volosca. On 24 March 1932 the division moved to Opatija and changed its name to 15th Territorial Division of Abbazia. In 1934 the division changed its name to 15th Infantry Division "Carnaro".

On 24 May 1939 the 73rd Infantry Regiment "Lombardia" in Rijeka changed its name to 25th Infantry Regiment "Bergamo", while the 12th Infantry Regiment "Casale" of the 12th Infantry Division "Sassari" in Trieste changed its name to 73rd Infantry Regiment "Lombardia". On the same date the 15th Infantry Division "Carnaro" was renamed 15th Infantry Division "Bergamo" and ceded the 74th Infantry Regiment "Lombardia" to the newly activated 57th Infantry Division "Lombardia", which also received the 73rd Infantry Regiment "Lombardia" from the 12th Infantry Division "Sassari" and the newly raised 57th Artillery Regiment.

=== World War II ===
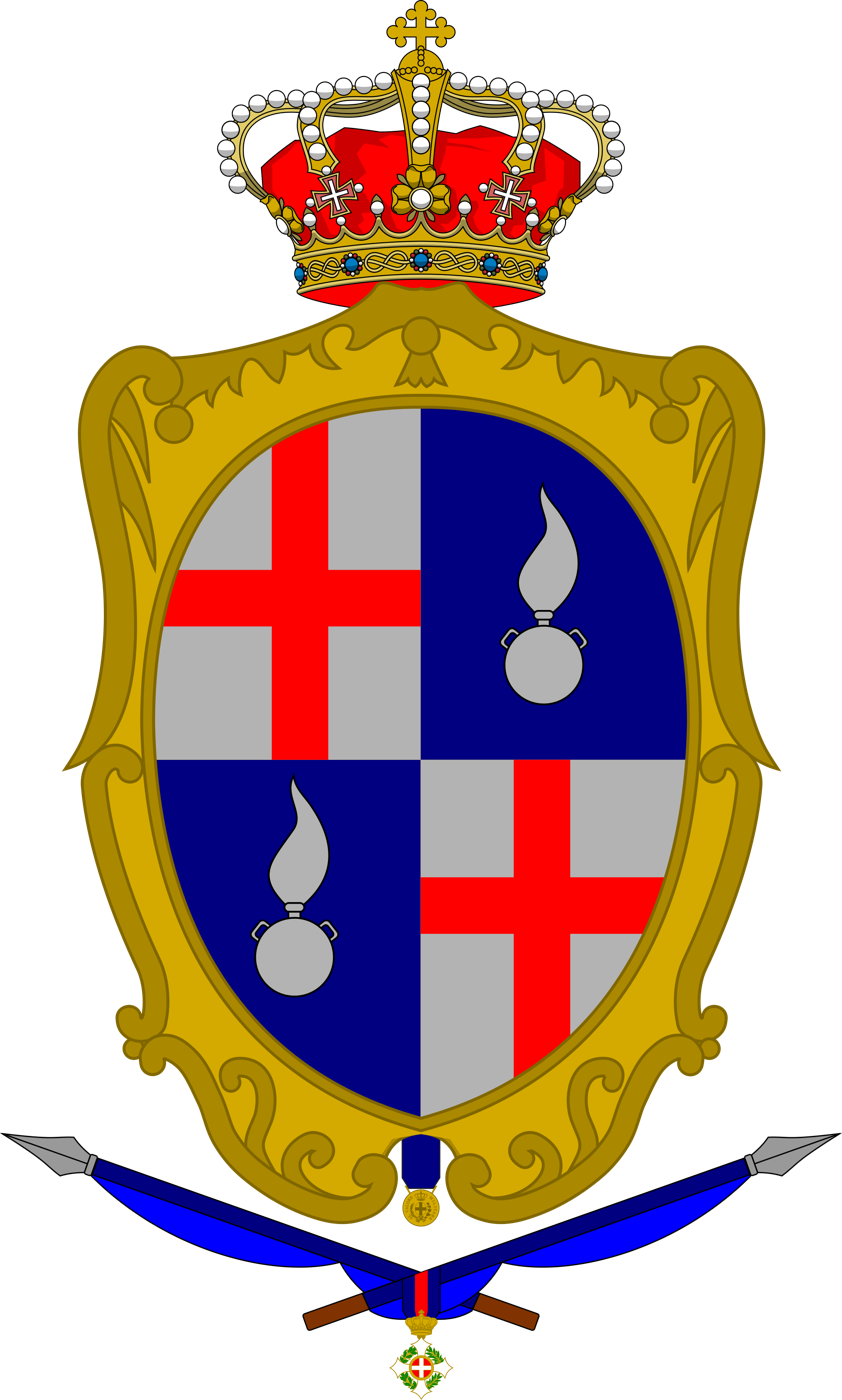
Coat of Arms of the 74th Infantry Regiment "Lombardia", 1939

The Lombardia remained at its garrisons until April 1941, when the division participated in the Invasion of Yugoslavia as part of the V Army Corps. On 8 April 1941 the division entered combat and on 11 April 1941 it broke through the Yugoslavian defences and crossed the border in the Sora river valley. On 12 April 1941 the Lombardia captured Podkilavac, Grobnik (near Čavle and Jelenje. By 13 April 1941 it had reached Krasica and Škrljevo, at which point the Yugoslavian army ceased to offer resistance. On 15 April 1941, garrisons in coastal towns of Novi Vinodolski, Ledenice, Crikvenica, and as far south as Žuta Lokva were established. From 9 October to 9 November 1941 the Lombardia participated in the anti-partisan Operation Uzice on the Serbo-Croatian border. By 1942 the division's main garrisons were in western Croatia at Gerovo, Delnice, and Ogulin.

While the 57th Infantry Division "Lombardia" was on occupation duty in Yugoslavia the division's regimental depots in Italy raised the 157th Infantry Division "Novara": the 73rd Infantry Regiment "Lombardia" raised the 153rd Infantry Regiment "Novara", the 74th Infantry Regiment "Lombardia" raised the 154th Infantry Regiment "Novara", and the 57th Artillery Regiment "Lombardia" raised the 157th Artillery Regiment "Novara".

In early 1943 the division also participated in the Battle of the Neretva. By that time partisan activity had grown in frequency and scale, and by September 1943 partisans routinely performed battalion-sized attacks on Italian checkpoints and railways. After the Armistice of Cassibile was announced on 8 September 1943, the Lombardia was disbanded by invading German forces.

== Organization ==
57th Infantry Division "Lombardia" organization in 1940

- 57th Infantry Division "Lombardia", in Pula
  - Headquarters
    - Command Company
    - 40th Carabinieri Section
    - 47th Carabinieri Section
    - 47th Field Post Office
    - 57th Infantry Division Command Transport Squad
  - 73rd Infantry Regiment "Lombardia", in Trieste
    - Command Company
    - 3 × Fusilier battalions
    - Support Weapons Battery (65/17 mod. 13 infantry support guns)
    - Mortar Company (81mm mod. 35 mortars)
  - 74th Infantry Regiment "Lombardia", in Pula
    - Command Company
    - 3 × Fusilier battalions
    - Support Weapons Battery (65/17 mod. 13 infantry support guns)
    - Mortar Company (81mm mod. 35 mortars)
  - 57th Artillery Regiment "Lombardia", in Pula (formed by the depot of the 4th Artillery Regiment "Bergamo")
    - Command Unit
    - I Group (100/17 mod. 14 howitzers; formed by the depot of the 3rd Artillery Regiment "Pistoia")
    - II Group (75/27 mod. 11 field guns; transferred from the 23rd Artillery Regiment "Re")
    - III Group (75/13 mod. 15 mountain guns; transferred from the 4th Artillery Regiment "Bergamo")
    - 357th Anti-aircraft Battery (20/65 mod. 35 anti-aircraft guns)
    - Ammunition and Supply Unit
  - LVII Mortar Battalion (81mm mod. 35 mortars)
  - 57th Anti-tank Company (47/32 mod. 35 anti-tank guns)
  - 37th Engineer Company
  - 57th Telegraph and Radio Operators Company
  - 57th Medical Section
    - 134th Field Hospital
    - 135th Field Hospital
  - 40th Supply Section
  - 57th Autocarrette Section
  - 1 × Transport Section

Attached to the division from late 1940 to early 1941:

- 173rd CC.NN. Legion "Monte Majella"
  - CLXIX CC.NN. Battalion
  - CLXXIII CC.NN. Battalion
  - 173rd CC.NN. Machine Gun Company

Attached to the division from early 1941:

- 137th CC.NN. Legion "Monte Majella"
  - CXXXIV CC.NN. Battalion
  - CXXXVII CC.NN. Battalion
  - 137th CC.NN. Machine Gun Company

Attached to the division in June 1943:

- 1st Cavalry Grouping "Lancieri di Vittorio Emanuele II"
  - XVI Dismounted Squadrons Group "Lancieri di Novara"
  - XVIII Dismounted Squadrons Group "Lancieri di Vittorio Emanuele II"
  - XIX Dismounted Squadrons Group "Genova Cavalleria"
- I Tank Battalion L, 1st Tank Infantry Regiment (L3/35 tankettes)
- LIV CC.NN. Battalion
- CXIII Artillery Group (149/13 heavy howitzers; formed by the 8th Army Corps Artillery Regiment)
- XX Pontieri Battalion (Light Bridges; formed by the 1st Pontieri Regiment)

== Commanding officers ==
The division's commanding officers were:

- Generale di Divisione Giovanni Esposito (24 May 1939 - 10 January 1941)
- Generale di Divisione Vittorio Zatti (24 January 1941 - 14 March 1943)
- Generale di Brigata Pietro Scipione (15 March - 10 September 1943)

== CROWCASS ==
The names of 14 men attached to the division can be found in the Central Registry of War Criminals and Security Suspects (CROWCASS) set up by the Anglo-American Supreme Headquarters Allied Expeditionary Force in 1945. The names can be found at: Central Registry of War Criminals and Security Suspects from the Kingdom of Italy.
