= 15th Infantry Division "Bergamo" =

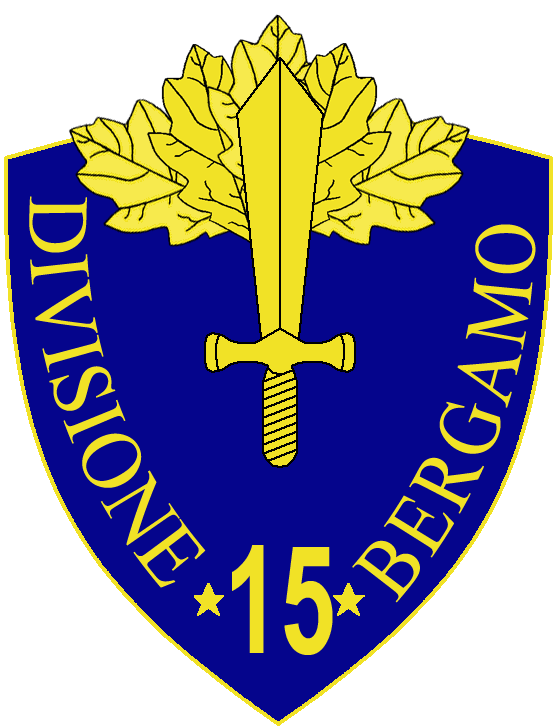
- 15th Infantry Division "Bergamo" insignia
- Active: 1939–1943
- Country: Kingdom of Italy
- Branch: Royal Italian Army
- Type: Infantry
- Size: Division
- Garrison/HQ: Opatija
- Engagements: World War II

Commanders
- Notable commanders: General Pietro Belletti

Insignia
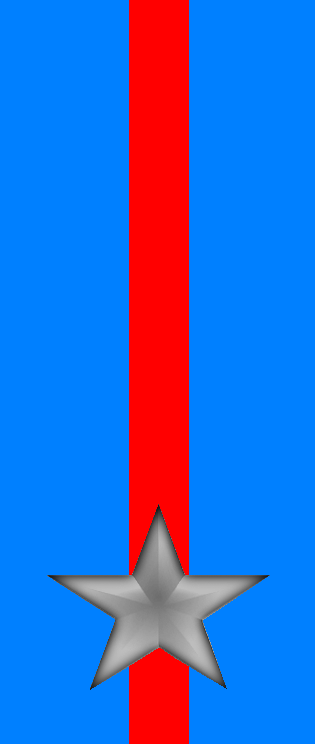
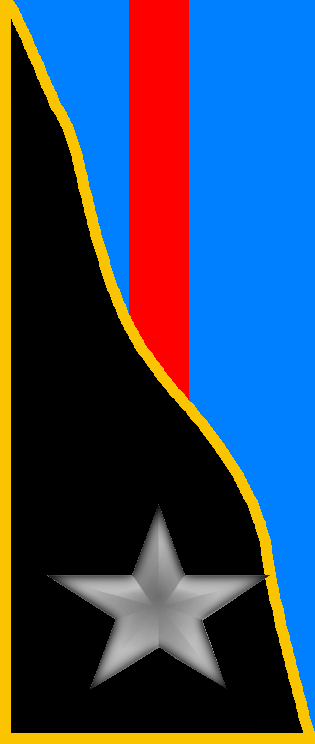
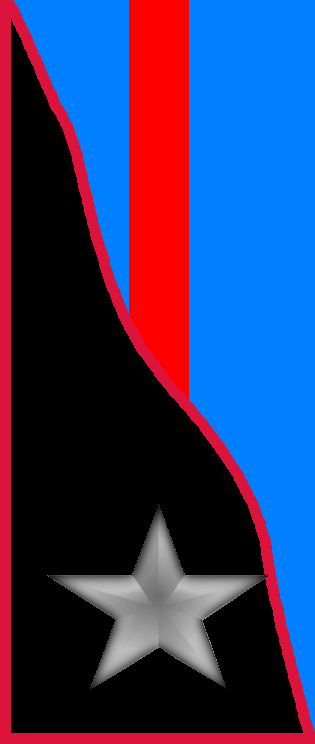
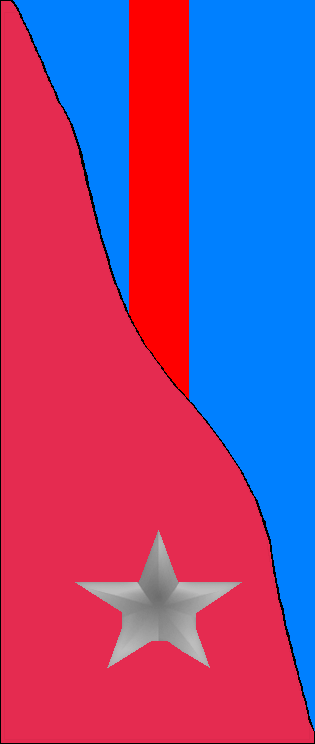
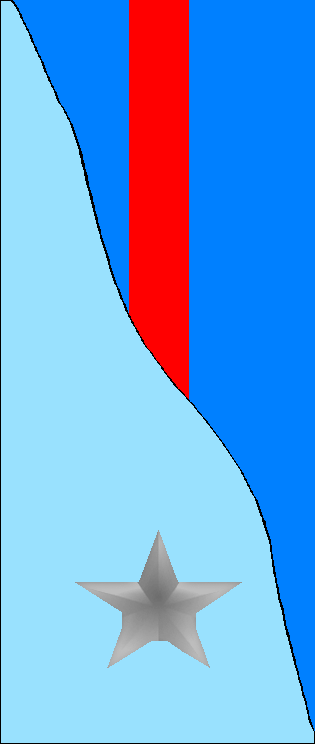
- Identification symbol: Bergamo Division gorget patches

The 15th Infantry Division "Bergamo" (Italian: 15ª Divisione di fanteria "Bergamo") was an infantry division of the Royal Italian Army during World War II. The Bergamo was based in Istria and named for the city of Bergamo.

== History ==
After the Second Italian War of Independence the Austrian Empire had to cede the Lombardy region of the Kingdom of Lombardy–Venetia to the Kingdom of Sardinia. After taking control of the region the government of Sardinian ordered the Royal Sardinian Army on 29 August 1859 to raise five infantry brigades and one grenadier brigade in Lombardy. Subsequently on 1 November 1859 the Brigade "Bergamo" was activated with the newly raised 25th and 26th infantry regiments.

=== World War I ===
The brigade fought on the Italian front in World War I. On 20 October 1926 the brigade command and the 25th Infantry Regiment were disbanded, while the 26th Infantry Regiment was transferred to the XV Infantry Brigade. The XV Infantry Brigade, which also included the 73rd Infantry Regiment "Lombardia" and the 74th Infantry Regiment "Lombardia", was the infantry component of the 15th Territorial Division of Pola, which also included the 4th Artillery Regiment. On 25 January 1930 the division moved to Volosko and consequently changed its name to 15th Territorial Division of Volosca. On 24 March 1932 the division moved to Opatija and changed its name to 15th Territorial Division of Abbazia. In 1934 the division changed its name to 15th Infantry Division "Carnaro".

On 24 May 1939 the 73rd Infantry Regiment "Lombardia" in Rijeka changed its name to 25th Infantry Regiment "Bergamo", while the 12th Infantry Regiment "Casale" of the 12th Infantry Division "Sassari" in Trieste changed its name to 73rd Infantry Regiment "Lombardia". The same day the division ceded the 74th Infantry Regiment "Lombardia" to the newly activated 57th Infantry Division "Lombardia" and changed its name to 15th Infantry Division "Bergamo". Also on the same day the XV Infantry Brigade was dissolved, with the 25th and 26th infantry regiments coming under direct command of the division, while the 4th Artillery Regiment received the name "Bergamo".

=== World War II ===
On 10 June 1940, the day Italy entered World War II, the Bergamo was deployed along the border with Yugoslavia in the Rijeka-Brešca-Klana sector. The division remained in the area on border patrol duty until the invasion of Yugoslavia on 6 April 1941. The Bergamo crossed the border on 6 April and on 11 April it broke through Yugoslavian defences on the Veli Vrh summit near Drenova and captured Kastav hill the same day. On 12 April it reached Bakar and continued to advance South along the Dalmatian coast. On 16 April 1941 the Bergamo captured Žuta Lokva village. After Yugoslavia's surrender the division was stationed in Dalmatia and garrisoned Makarska, Livno, Sinj, Ljubuški, Imotski and the island of Brač.

From 22–25 July 1941 the Bergamo fought Yugoslav partisans near Drvar. Another surge of fighting with Yugoslav partisans entering the Independent State of Croatia occurred from 9 October to 9 November 1941. Afterwards the main duties of the Bergamo were coastal defence, road protection and peacekeeping among the local communities. In June 1942 the division suppressed a major partisan revolt in the Lika region. The Bergamo took part in the anti-partisan Operation Alba in Croatia from 12 August to 2 September 1942. The aim of Operation Alba was to destroy partisan groups in the Biokovo area 40-50 kilometres east of Split. Italian forces burned down ten villages and killed and arrested several hundred people. In 1943 the division was garrisoned in Split and increasingly bloody skirmishes with partisans were fought.

While the Bergamo was on occupation duty in Yugoslavia the division's regimental depots in Italy raised the 156th Infantry Division "Vicenza": the depot of the 25th Infantry Regiment "Bergamo" raised the 277th Infantry Regiment "Vicenza", the depot of the 26th Infantry Regiment "Bergamo" raised the 278th Infantry Regiment "Vicenza", and the depot of the 4th Artillery Regiment "Bergamo" raised the 156th Artillery Regiment "Vicenza".

After announcement of the Armistice of Cassibile on 8 September 1943 the Bergamo fought briefly the invading German forces of the German XV Mountain Corps. After the Bergamo surrendered the Germans executed some of the division's officers in retaliation for their resistance.

== Organization ==
15th Infantry Division "Bergamo" organization in 1940

- 15th Infantry Division "Bergamo", in Opatija
  - Headquarters
    - Command Company
    - 2x Carabinieri sections (merged into the IX Carabinieri Battalion in 1943)
    - 73rd Field Post Office
    - 15th Infantry Division Command Transport Squad
  - 25th Infantry Regiment "Bergamo", in Rijeka
    - Command Company
    - 3 × Fusilier battalions
    - Support Weapons Battery (65/17 mod. 13 infantry support guns)
    - Mortar Company (81mm mod. 35 mortars)
  - 26th Infantry Regiment "Bergamo", in Rijeka
    - Command Company
    - 3 × Fusilier battalions
    - Support Weapons Battery (65/17 mod. 13 infantry support guns)
    - Mortar Company (81mm mod. 35 mortars)
  - 4th Artillery Regiment "Bergamo", in Lovran mod.
    - Command Unit
    - I Group (100/17 mod. 14 howitzers)
    - II Group (75/27 mod. 11 field guns)
    - III Group (75/13 mod. 15 mountain guns; transferred on 13 March 1941 to the 56th Artillery Regiment "Casale" in exchange for a group with 75/27 mod. 11 field guns)
    - 1 × Anti-aircraft battery (20/65 mod. 35 anti-aircraft guns)
    - Ammunition and Supply Unit
  - XV Mortar Battalion (81mm mod. 35 mortars)
  - 15th Anti-tank Company (47/32 mod. 35 anti-tank guns)
  - 15th Telegraph and Radio Operators Company
  - 36th Engineer Company
  - 19th Medical Section
    - 131st Field Hospital
    - 132nd Field Hospital
    - 1 × Surgical Unit
  - 15th Autocarrette Section
  - 116th Supply Section
  - 1 × Transport Section

Attached from 1941:

- 89th CC.NN. Legion "Etrusca"
  - Command Company
  - LXXXIX CC.NN. Battalion
  - XCVII CC.NN. Battalion
  - 89th CC.NN. Machine Gun Company

Attached in 1943:

- Military Garrison Split, in Split
  - 4th Bersaglieri Regiment
    - Command Company
    - XXVI Bersaglieri Battalion
    - XXIX Bersaglieri Battalion
    - XXXI Bersaglieri Battalion
    - 4th Bersaglieri Motorcyclists Company
    - 4th Anti-tank Company (47/32 mod. 35 anti-tank guns)
  - V Garrison Battalion
  - X Garrison Battalion
  - IX Carabinieri Battalion
  - CVI Motorized Machine Gun Battalion
  - CCXI Mobile Territorial Battalion
  - CCXXVIII Mobile Territorial Battalion
  - CCXXIX Mobile Territorial Battalion
  - CVIII Army Corps Artillery Group
  - V Mining Engineers Battalion
  - 2nd Squadron, I Light Tank Group "San Giusto" (L6/40 tanks)
  - 324th Alpini Garrison Company
  - 125th Signal Engineers Company
- XVII Coastal Brigade, in Split
  - 156th Coastal Infantry Regiment
  - 157th Coastal Infantry Regiment
- LII Dismounted Squadrons Group, Regiment "Piemonte Reale Cavalleria"

== Commanding officers ==
The division's commanding officers were:

- Generale di Divisione Francesco Laviano (1938 - 10 April 1939)
- Generale di Divisione Ugo Gigliarelli Fiumi (11 October 1939 - 1 December 1940)
- Generale di Divisione Pietro Belletti (2 December 1940 - 28 February 1942)
- Generale di Divisione Alessandro Piazzoni (1 March 1942 - 28 February 1943)
- Generale di Brigata Emilio Becuzzi (1 March 1943 - 8 September 1943)

== CROWCASS ==
The names of three men attached to the division can be found in the Central Registry of War Criminals and Security Suspects (CROWCASS) set up by the Anglo-American Supreme Headquarters Allied Expeditionary Force in 1945. The names can be found at: Central Registry of War Criminals and Security Suspects from the Kingdom of Italy.
