= 223rd Coastal Division =

Royal Italian Army infantry division during World War II

- Active: 1942 – 1943
- Country: Kingdom of Italy
- Branch: Royal Italian Army
- Size: Division
- Garrison/HQ: La Colle-sur-Loup
- Engagements: World War II

Insignia
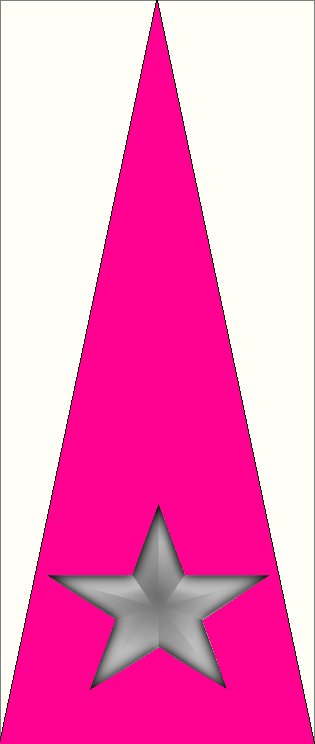
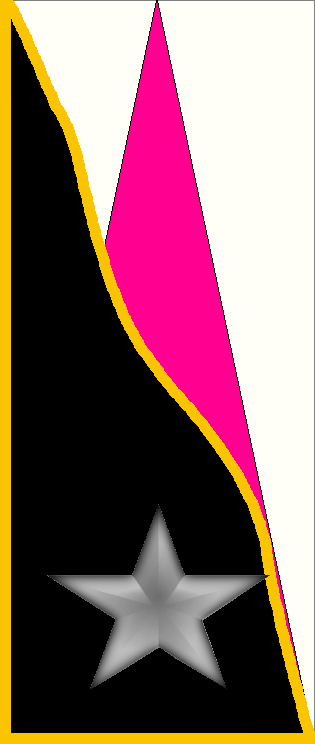
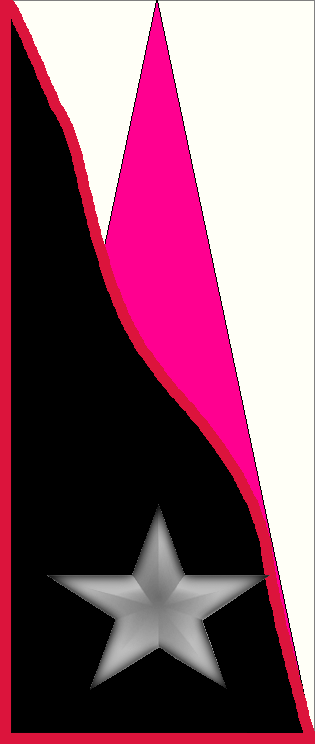
- Identification symbol: 223rd Coastal Division gorget patches

The 223rd Coastal Division (Italian: 223ª Divisione Costiera) was an infantry division of the Royal Italian Army during World War II. Royal Italian Army coastal divisions were second line divisions formed with reservists and equipped with second rate materiel. They were often commanded by officers called out of retirement.

== History ==
In November 1942 Axis forces invaded Southern France and divided it into a German and an Italian occupation zone. For the coastal defense of its zone Italy raised on 1 January 1943 the 223rd Coastal Division in Bologna and the 224th Coastal Division in Florence. Both divisions were formed with replacements and reserve units of the army's regular Alpini regiments.

The 223rd Coastal Division was based in La Colle-sur-Loup and assigned to I Army Corps. After the announcement of the Armistice of Cassibile on 8 September 1943 the division was disbanded by invading German forces.

== Organization ==
- 223rd Coastal Division, in La Colle-sur-Loup
  - 166th Coastal Alpini Regiment
    - Alpini Battalion "Monte Spluga" (formed from the XXXIV Replacements Battalion, 5th Alpini Regiment)
    - Alpini Battalion "Monte Stelvio" (formed from the XXXV Replacements Battalion, 5th Alpini Regiment)
    - Alpini Battalion "Monte Pavione" (formed from the XXXVI Replacements Battalion, 7th Alpini Regiment)
    - Alpini Battalion "Monte Arvenis" (formed from the XXXVIII Replacements Battalion, 8th Alpini Regiment)
    - DXII Mobile Territorial Alpini Battalion
  - 167th Coastal Alpini Regiment
    - Alpini Battalion "Monte Levanna" (formed from the XXIII Replacements Battalion, 4th Alpini Regiment)
    - Alpini Battalion "Monte Suello" (formed from the XXIV Replacements Battalion, 6th Alpini Regiment)
    - Alpini Battalion "Monte Berico" (formed from the XXXIX Replacements Battalion, 9th Alpini Regiment)
  - 7 × Coastal artillery groups
  - 223rd Mixed Engineer Company
  - 223rd Carabinieri Section
  - 144th Field Post Office
  - Division Services

== Commanding officers ==
The division's commanding officer was:

- Generale di Divisione Amedeo De Cia (1 January 1943 - 9 September 1943)
