= Amedeo De Cia =

Italian general

- Born: March 23, 1883; Gerace Marina, Kingdom of Italy
- Died: 7 April 1971 (aged 88); Milan, Italy
- Military career
- Allegiance: Kingdom of Italy; Italian Social Republic
- Branch: Royal Italian Army; National Republican Army
- Service years: 1905–1945
- Rank: Major General
- Commands: "Bassano" Alpini Battalion "Feltre" Alpini Battalion "Borgo San Dalmazzo" Alpini Battalion; 55th Infantry Regiment "Marche"; Military District of Bolzano; Alpini and Bersaglieri Officers and NCO School; 5th Alpine Division "Pusteria"; 58th Infantry Division "Legnano"; 223rd Coastal Division; Liguria Regional Military Command; 4th Alpine Division "Monterosa"
- Conflicts: Italo-Turkish War; World War I; Battles of the Isonzo; White War; Battle of Asiago; Second Battle of Monte Grappa; Battle of Vittorio Veneto; World War II; Battle of the Western Alps; Greco-Italian War; Italian occupation of France; Italian campaign
- Awards: Silver Medal of Military Valor (four times); Bronze Medal of Military Valor (twice); Military Order of Savoy; Order of the Crown of Italy; Croix de guerre 1914-1918 (France)

Amedeo De Cia (23 December 1883 – 7 April 1971) was an Italian general during World War II.

== Biography ==
=== Early life ===
Amedeo De Cia was born in Gerace Marina on 23 December 1883, the son of Giovanni De Cia, an administrative inspector of the Kingdom of Sardinia of Venetian ancestry, and of the noblewoman Elvira Palermo of the Princes of Santa Margherita. In 1898 his family moved to Genoa, and there he completed his high school studies by enrolling in the engineering faculty of the local university. Following his mother's death, he abandoned his studies to pursue a military career. He attended the Royal Military Academy of Modena and graduated with the rank of infantry second lieutenant in 1905. After attending the Application School in Parma, in 1907 he entered service with the 76th Infantry Regiment of the "Napoli" Infantry Brigade, stationed in Genoa; in 1909 he was assigned to the "Ivrea" Battalion of the 4th Alpini Regiment.

=== Career ===
==== Italo-Turkish War ====
Following the outbreak of the Italo-Turkish War, in 1911, he left for Libya as platoon commander of the 40th Alpini Company, distinguishing himself in Derna, during the defense of the "Lombardia" Redoubt on March 3, 1912, for which he was awarded the Bronze Medal of Military Valor. After returning to Italy he was promoted to the rank of captain, and in 1914 he was assigned as company commander to the 89th Infantry Regiment "Salerno". After the entry of the Kingdom of Italy in the First World War on 24 May 1915, his regiment was deployed in the upper Isonzo valley and fought in the battles of the Isonzo. On 4 June De Cia distinguished himself during the attack on the ridge of Mount Mrzli-Mount Sleme, earning a second bronze medal for military valor. On the following 15 June he was once again transferred to the Alpini Corps, taking command of the 11th Company of the "Mondovì" Battalion, temporarily detached from the "Val Ellero" Battalion. During the attack for the conquest of Mount Kucla he was seriously injured by a bullet in his chest, after which he was hospitalized for several months; he returned to service in March 1916, at the command of the 118th Company of the "Monte Clapier" Alpini Battalion, engaged in Val Fella (Carnic Alps).

In May–June 1916 his battalion, deployed on the Tonezza plateau north of Arsiero, took part in the fighting to stop the Austro-Hungarian offensive launched by General Conrad von Hötzendorf. From the month of July he participated in the counterattacks that lead to the reconquest of part of the lost territory; during this period he was awarded two Silver Medals for military valor and was mentioned on the Order of the Day of the French Army for his valiant behavior. In April 1917 he was promoted to the rank of major and given command of the "Bassano" Alpini Battalion, but had to relinquish command of the battalion due to a serious ankle sprain shortly before the battle of Mount Ortigara, in which the battalion was almost completely destroyed. After the battle he helped to rebuild the battalion, which was once again deployed on the Asiago plateau under his command. After the battle of Caporetto his unit fought on Monte Sisemol, in the Melette, helping to stop the Austro-German offensive. In January 1918 he participated in an offensive on the Asiago plateau which resulted in the conquest of the Col d'Echele, which earned him a third silver medal for military valor. After a period of rest in the rear between the area of Vicenza and Mussolente, in June his battalion participated in the Second Battle of Monte Grappa, and in October in the battle of Vittorio Veneto. On 27 October 1918 his battalion, together with a French one, first crossed the Piave at Pederobba, forming a bridgehead over the river. Due to the destruction of a walkway, the two units remained isolated for two days resisting enemy counterattacks until reinforcements arrived. The attack resumed on the 30th, and after a fierce clash in the village of Settolo, De Cia entered in Valdobbiadene at the head of his men. For this action he was awarded the Knight's Cross of the Military Order of Savoy.

At the end of the hostilities, his battalion was part of the 9th Alpini Regiment stationed in Gorizia, and in 1920 it was deployed in the Timavo Valley. In 1921 De Cia married Miss Afra Ferrari, from whom in 1922 he had a son, Alberto; in 1926 he was promoted to the rank of lieutenant colonel, commanding in succession and the "Feltre" Alpini Battalion and in 1929 the "Borgo San Dalmazzo" Alpini Battalion. In 1932 he became colonel, taking command of the 55th Infantry Regiment of the "Marche" Infantry Brigade, stationed in Treviso, and in 1935 he assumed command of the Military District of Bolzano and then of the School of Officers and Non-Commissioned Officers of the Alpini and Bersaglieri in Bassano del Grappa. In August 1938 he was promoted to the rank of brigadier general, and assumed command of the 5th Alpine Division "Pusteria", with headquarters in Brunico.

==== World War II ====
In June 1940, after Italy's entry into World War II, De Cia took part in the Battle of the Western Alps in command of the "Pusteria" Division, deployed in the Colle della Maddalena area. After the armistice with France, on 28 October Italy attacked Greece, starting the Greco-Italian War. The initial Italian advance was checked and later reversed by the Greek counter-offensive; as the situation worsened, the "Pusteria" Division was hurriedly sent to the Albanian front, to be deployed on the left of the 3rd Alpine Division "Julia" to blockade the Osum Valley. In December, the desperate resistance of the Italian troops stopped the Greek counter-offensive aimed at capturing Valona and driving the Italians back into the sea. In January 1941 De Cia harshly criticized the conduct of the campaign against Greece, stating that he was no longer willing to sacrifice a single soldier or a single mule in that insane operation (he had already previously criticized the conduct of the operations against France); this resulted in his immediate dismissal, even though he was promoted to the rank of major general, and his replacement by General Giovanni Esposito was passed off as a routine change of command.

A few days later, on January 25, 1941, De Cia assumed command of the 58th Infantry Division "Legnano" after its commander (General Vittorio Ruggero), who had just arrived from Italy, was injured in a road accident. The Division was deployed on the Vjosa river in defense of Tepelenë, and resisted the last Greek offensive, after which it went on the offensive in April 1941 and took Klisura, as Greek resistance collapsed following the German intervention. For the conduct of the operations between 26 January and 18 April 1941 he was awarded his fourth silver medal for military valor. In the summer of 1941 the "Legnano" Division returned to Italy, where it was stationed in defense of the Riviera di Ponente in Liguria. In November 1942, following the Axis occupation of Vichy France, the division was transferred to Provence, placing its headquarters in Nice. In January 1943 De Cia was given command of the 223rd Coastal Division, also stationed in Provence, for which he began a training program in collaboration with the German forces.

==== After World War II ====
At the proclamation of the armistice of Cassibile, on 8 September 1943, De Cia was at his headquarters, where he initially tried to resist the Germans who ordered him to surrender, but eventually desisted to avoid unnecessary bloodshed. He later joined the Italian Social Republic, and on 24 September 1943 he was made director of the Directorate for Assistance to Italian Internees in Southern France. In January–February 1944 he was appointed Regional Military Commander of Liguria within the National Republican Army, but he was later replaced due to strife with the Germans. He remained at the disposal of the Ministry of the Armed Forces and the General Staff of the Republican National Army. In April 1944 he was appointed Inspector of the Alpine Troops of the RSI, after refusing the appointment as President of the Supreme Military Court, and in March 1945 he assumed command of the newly established 4th Alpine Division "Monterosa". At the end of the war he was not tried, but on November 12, 1945 he was informed of "the cancellation from the roles with loss of rank". He was fully reinstated by Decree of the Defense Ministry of June 9, 1950. Retiring to private life, he made very few public appearances, and died in Milan on April 7, 1971. His body was buried at the family tomb in the cemetery of Bassano del Grappa.
