= Ugo Gigliarelli Fiumi =

Italian general (1880–1944)

- Born: 24 February 1880; Soresina, Kingdom of Italy
- Died: 5 October 1944 (aged 64); Rome, Kingdom of Italy
- Military career
- Allegiance: Kingdom of Italy
- Branch: Royal Italian Army
- Rank: Lieutenant general
- Commands: 31st Infantry Regiment "Siena"; Southern Libya Military Command; XVII Infantry Brigade "Rubicone"; Royal Corps of Colonial Troops of Libya; East Libya Military Command; 15th Infantry Division "Bergamo"
- Conflicts: Italo-Turkish War; Battle of Sidi Bilal; World War I; Battles of the Isonzo; Battle of Asiago; Second Battle of the Piave River; Battle of Vittorio Veneto; Second Italo-Senussi War; World War II
- Awards: Silver Medal of Military Valor (four times); Bronze Medal of Military Valor; Order of the Crown of Italy; Colonial Order of the Star of Italy; Order of Saints Maurice and Lazarus; Maurician Medal; Croix de Guerre 1914-1918

Ugo Gigliarelli Fiumi (Soresina, 24 February 1880 – Rome, 5 October 1944) was an Italian general during World War II.

== Biography ==
He was born in Soresina on 24 February 1880, into a family of Umbrian origins. After attending the Royal Military Academy of Infantry and Cavalry in Modena, he graduated with the rank of infantry second lieutenant. He was promoted to lieutenant on 20 December 1903; in March 1912 he was promoted to the rank of captain while serving in the 82nd Regiment of the "Siena" Infantry Brigade in Siena, but in June of the same year he was assigned to the 23rd Infantry Regiment, deployed to Libya for the Italo-Turkish War. There he was wounded in action and awarded a Silver Medal of Military Valor in the battle of Sidi Bilal.

During the First World War he fought on the Isonzo Front and later on the Asiago plateau, being repeatedly wounded. In April 1916 he was promoted to major and assumed command of the 2nd Battalion, 129th Infantry Regiment, of the "Perugia" Infantry Brigade. After promotion to lieutenant colonel on 1 January 1917, he was assigned to the 51st Infantry Regiment and then transferred to the 4th. In 1918 he was appointed chief of staff of the 11th Division, then under the command of Lieutenant General Ettore Negri di Lamporo, participating in the Second Battle of the Piave River and in the battle of Vittorio Veneto. During the war he received three Silver Medals and one Bronze Medal of Military Valor, and a mention in despatches of the Armée d'Orient on 4 August 1918, signed by Marshal Philippe Pétain.

In 1925 he was appointed commander of the 31st Infantry Regiment "Siena", being promoted to colonel on 1 June 1926. He was then transferred to Libya, where between 1927 and 1931 he was military commander of the southern Libyan territories (Fezzan). After promotion to brigadier general on 1 January 1933, he was appointed chief of staff of the Royal Corps of Colonial Troops of Libya. After returning to Italy, in 1934 he was mobilization inspector at the 22nd Infantry Division "Cacciatori delle Alpi", in Perugia, and on 1 February 1935 he became commander of the XVII Infantry Brigade "Rubicone" in Ferrara. After returning to Libya, on 1 May 1935 he assumed command of the local Royal Corps of Colonial Troops, and the post of military commander of Eastern Libya from 1 May 1935 to 10 April 1939. He was promoted to major general on 1 July 1937, and was transferred to the service of the Ministry of Italian Africa.

On 10 April 1939 he was appointed commander of the 15th Infantry Division "Bergamo", a post he still held when the Kingdom of Italy entered the Second World War on 10 June 1940, when his Division was deployed near the border between Italy and Yugoslavia. On 1 December 1940 he was transferred to the Ministry of War, where he remained until 1 January 1943, when he was transferred to the Army reserve. On 1 January 1941 he had been promoted to the rank of lieutenant general. He died in Rome on 5 October 1944.
