= Ponikve, Bakar =

Village in Primorje-Gorski Kotar, Croatia

Ponikve
- Village
- Location within Croatia
- Coordinates: 45.34046°N 14.54013°E
- Country: Croatia
- County: Primorje-Gorski Kotar
- Town: Bakar

Area
  - Total: 4.5 km^{2} (1.7 sq mi)

Population (2021)
  - Total: 44
  - Density: 9.8/km^{2} (25/sq mi)
- Time zone: UTC+1 (CET)
  - Summer (DST): UTC+2 (CEST)
- Postal code: 51223
- Area code: 051
- Vehicle registration: RI

Ponikve is a village in Primorje-Gorski Kotar, western Croatia. Administratively a part of the town of Bakar, it is located just to the south of Plosna and 2 km to the north of Škrljevo. As of 2021, it had a population of 44.

== Climate ==
Between 1987 and 2009, the highest temperature recorded at the local weather station was 37.4 °C (99.3 °F), on 4 August 2003. The coldest temperature was −15.7 °C (3.7 °F), on 14 February 1991.
