= 73rd Infantry Regiment "Lombardia" =

Inactive Italian Army infantry unit

- 73° Reggimento Fanteria "Lombardia"
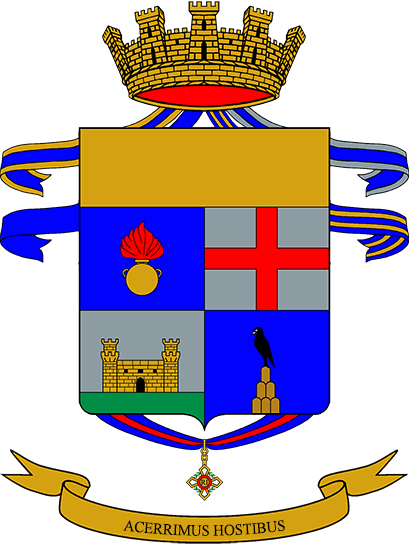
- Regimental coat of arms
- Active: 1 Nov. 1859 – 9 Sept. 1943; 1 Jan. 1963 – 1 Nov. 1973; 1 Oct. 1976 – 10 Oct. 1986
- Country: Italy
- Branch: Italian Army
- Garrison/HQ: Arzene
- Motto: "Acerrimus hostibus"
- Anniversaries: 12 August 1916 – Battle of Nad Logem
- Decorations: 1× Military Order of Italy; 1× Gold Medal of Military Valor; 1× Silver Medal of Military Valor; 1× Bronze Medal of Military Valor; 1× Silver Medal of Army Valor

Insignia
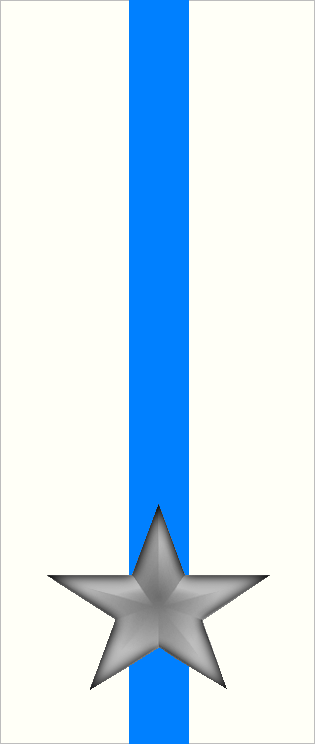
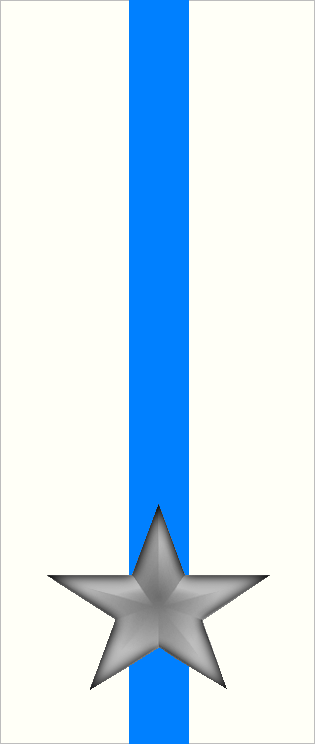
- Regimental gorget patches

The 73rd Infantry Regiment "Lombardia" (Italian: 73° Reggimento Fanteria "Lombardia") is an inactive unit of the Italian Army last based in Arzene. The regiment is named for the region of Lombardy and part of the Italian Army's infantry arm.

The regiment was formed 1859 as a Grenadier regiment, but was transferred to the line infantry in 1871. In 1866 the regiment fought in the Third Italian War of Independence and in 1870 it participated in the capture of Rome. In World War I the regiment fought on the Italian front. During World War II the regiment was assigned to the 57th Infantry Division "Lombardia", with which it participated in the Invasion of Yugoslavia. Afterwards the division remained in occupied Yugoslavia until it was disbanded by invading German forces after the announcement of the Armistice of Cassibile on 8 September 1943. In 1963 the regiment was reformed, but in 1973 it was reduced to a battalion sized unit, which was disbanded in 1986.

== History ==
=== Formation ===
In 1859, after the conclusion of the Second Italian War of Independence, the Austro-Hungarian Empire was forced to cede the Western half of the Kingdom of Lombardy–Venetia, the region of Lombardy, to the Second French Empire, which transferred the region to the Kingdom of Sardinia.

After the annexation of Lombardy the Royal Sardinian Army began to form new regiments with personnel levied in the region. On 1 November 1859 the 1st Grenadier Regiment (Grenadiers of Sardinia Brigade) ceded two of its battalions to help form the 3rd Grenadier Regiment (Grenadiers of Lombardy Brigade). On the same date the 2nd Grenadier Regiment (Grenadiers of Sardinia Brigade) ceded two of its battalions to help form the 4th Grenadier Regiment (Grenadiers of Lombardy Brigade). The 3rd Grenadier Regiment was mustered and initially based in Genoa, while the 4th Grenadier Regiment was mustered and initially based in Turin. Both regiments consisted of a staff and four battalions, two of which had been freshly levied in Lombardy.

=== Italian Wars of Independence ===
On 16 April 1861 the 3rd Grenadier Regiment and 4th Grenadier Regiment of the Grenadiers of Lombardy Brigade ceded each one battalion to help form the 6th Grenadier Regiment (Grenadiers of Naples Brigade). On 1 August 1862 the 3rd Grenadier Regiment ceded its 17th Company and 18th Company to help form the 7th Grenadier Regiment (Grenadiers of Tuscany Brigade), while the 4th Grenadier Regiment ceded its 17th Company and 18th Company to help form the 8th Grenadier Regiment (Grenadiers of Tuscany Brigade). After the formation of the 7th and 8th grenadier regiments of the Grenadiers of Tuscany Brigade the army the Royal Italian Army fielded eight grenadier regiments, which all consisted of a staff and three battalions, with six grenadier companies per battalion.

In the 1860–1861 the brigade participated in the campaign in central and southern Italy, where the regiment fought at Spoleto and in the Battle of Mola. For its conduct during the storming of the fortress of Albornoziana in Spoleto the 3rd Grenadier Regiment was awarded a Silver Medal of Military Valor.

In 1861–70 detachments of the regiment operated in southern Italy to suppress the anti-Sardinian revolt, which had erupted after the Kingdom of Sardinia had invaded and annexed the Kingdom of Two Sicilies. Detachments of the regiments fought with rebels at Boville Ernica and at Durazzano, where the 2nd Platoon of the regiment's 10th Company distinguished itself in June 1861 to such an extent that the regiment was awarded a Bronze Medal of Military Valor. In 1866 the brigade participated in the Third Italian War of Independence and fought in the Battle of Custoza.

In 1870 the regiment participated in the capture of Rome. On 1 April 1871 the Grenadiers of Lombardy Brigade and its two regiments were transferred from the Grenadiers speciality to the line infantry. On the same date the brigade was renamed Brigade "Lombardia", and its two regiments became the 73rd Infantry Regiment and 74th Infantry Regiment. On 25 October of the same year the brigade level was abolished and the two regiments of the Brigade "Lombardia" were renamed 73rd Infantry Regiment "Lombardia", respectively 74th Infantry Regiment "Lombardia".

On 2 January 1881 the brigade level was reintroduced and the two regiments were renamed again as 73rd Infantry Regiment (Brigade "Lombardia") and 74th Infantry Regiment (Brigade "Lombardia").

On 1 November 1884 the regiment ceded some of its companies to help form the 79th Infantry Regiment (Brigade "Roma"). In 1895–96 the regiment provided four officers and 203 enlisted for units deployed to Italian Eritrea for the First Italo-Ethiopian War. In 1911–12 the regiment provided six officers and 667 enlisted to augment units fighting in the Italo-Turkish War.

=== World War I ===
At the outbreak of World War I, the Brigade "Lombardia" formed, together with the Brigade "Livorno" and the 26th Field Artillery Regiment, the 4th Division. At the time the 73rd Infantry Regiment consisted of three battalions, each of which fielded four fusilier companies and one machine gun section. After Italy's entry into the war on 23 May 1915 the Brigade "Lombardia" was deployed to the Italian front: in June 1915 the regiment fought in the First Battle of the Isonzo against Austro-Hungarian forces on Monte Peuma. In fall of 1915 the brigade was at in the Oslavia sector, where it fought in the Third Battle of the Isonzo and the Fourth Battle of the Isonzo. In May and June 1916 the brigade fought in the Battle of Asiago. In August 1916 the brigade was transferred to the Karst plateau in the area of Rubije, where it fought in the Sixth Battle of the Isonzo, during which the brigade conquered and held the summit of Nad Logem. In November 1916 the brigade fought in the Ninth Battle of the Isonzo, during which it managed to take and hold the summits of the Pečinka and Veliki Hribach. For taking the three summits the two regiments of the Brigade "Lombardia" were both awarded a Gold Medal of Military Valor.

In May 1917 the brigade fought in the Tenth Battle of the Isonzo at Hudi Log and Kostanjevica. On 12 March 1917 the regimental depot of the 73rd Infantry Regiment in Alba formed the 276th Infantry Regiment (Brigade "Belluno"). In August of the same year the brigade fought in the Eleventh Battle of the Isonzo on the slopes of Fajtji hrib. In June 1918 the brigade fought in the Second Battle of the Piave River in the Monte Grappa sector. In October–November 1918 the brigade fought in the decisive Battle of Vittorio Veneto on the ridge of Monte Solarolo.

=== Interwar years ===
After the war King Victor Emmanuel III granted on 19 February 1920 the two regiments of the Brigade "Lombardia" the privilege to wear azure ties with their parade uniform as symbol of the regiments' loyalty, honor, and valor.

In 1921 the regiment moved from Alba to the newly annexed city Pula. On 20 October 1926 the Brigade "Lombardia" was renamed XV Infantry Brigade. The brigade was the infantry component of the 15th Territorial Division of Pola. On the same date the brigade's two infantry regiments were renamed 73rd Infantry Regiment "Lombardia", respectively 74th Infantry Regiment "Lombardia", and both regiments received a third battalion from regiments, which had been disbanded in 1926: the 73rd received a battalion from the 39th Infantry Regiment (Brigade "Bologna"), while the 74th received a battalion from the 32nd Infantry Regiment (Brigade "Siena"). The XV Infantry Brigade also included the 26th Infantry Regiment "Bergamo" from the disbanded Brigade "Bergamo".

In 1929 the regiment moved from Pula to Rijeka. In 1934 the division changed its name to 15th Infantry Division "Carnaro". A name change that also extended to the division's infantry brigade. In 1935–36 the regiment provided 20 officers and 224 enlisted for the units deployed for the Second Italo-Ethiopian War.

On 24 May 1939 the 73rd Infantry Regiment "Lombardia" in Rijeka changed its name to 25th Infantry Regiment "Bergamo", while the 12th Infantry Regiment "Casale" of the 12th Infantry Division "Sassari" in Trieste changed its name to 73rd Infantry Regiment "Lombardia". On the same date the 15th Infantry Division "Carnaro" was renamed 15th Infantry Division "Bergamo" and ceded the 74th Infantry Regiment "Lombardia" to the newly activated 57th Infantry Division "Lombardia", which also received the 73rd Infantry Regiment "Lombardia" from the 12th Infantry Division "Sassari".

=== World War II ===
At the outbreak of World War II the regiment consisted of a command, a command company, three fusilier battalions, a support weapons battery equipped with 65/17 infantry support guns, and a mortar company equipped with 81mm Mod. 35 mortars. In April 1941 the division participated in the Invasion of Yugoslavia. Afterwards the division remained in occupied Yugoslavia on anti-partisan duty.

On 5 January 1942 the depot of the 73rd Infantry Regiment in Trieste formed the 153rd Infantry Regiment "Novara" for the 157th Infantry Division "Novara". In early 1943 the division fought in the Battle of the Neretva. After the announcement of the Armistice of Cassibile on 8 September 1943 the division skirmished with Germans forces, while trying to reach Rijeka and Ilirska Bistrica in Italy. On 9 September 1943 the division and its regiments were overcome by invading German forces and disbanded.

=== Cold War ===
On 1 January 1963 the regiment was reformed in Arzene as 73rd Infantry Fortification Regiment "Lombardia" and assigned to the command designated "3rd Army". The regiment consisted of a command, a command company, and the II Fortification Battalion in Spilimbergo and IV Fortification Battalion in Latisana. In case of war the regiment was tasked with manning fortifications of the Alpine Wall on the Tagliamento river between Trasaghis and Latisana. On 1 December 1971 the command designated "3rd Army" was disbanded and the regiment was assigned to the V Army Corps.

On 1 November 1973 the regiment was reduced to LXXIII Infantry Fortification Battalion "Lombardia" based in Arzene. The battalion consisted of a command, a command company, and four Infantry Fortification companies, two of which were detached to Latisana. On 1 March 1974 the battalion was transferred from the V Army Corps to the Armored Division "Ariete".

During the 1975 army reform the Italian Army disbanded the regimental level and newly independent battalions were granted for the first time their own flags. On 1 October 1976 the LXXIII Infantry Fortification Battalion "Lombardia" was renamed 73rd Infantry Fortification Battalion "Lombardia" and assigned the flag and traditions of the 73rd Infantry Regiment "Lombardia". On the same date the 74th Infantry Fortification Battalion "Pontida" was listed as a reserve unit, which in case of war would have received the flag and traditions of the 74th Infantry Regiment "Lombardia". To avoid confusion between the two battalions the name of the 74th was changed from "Lombardia" to "Pontida" to commemorate the 1167 A.D. Oath of Pontida, which gave birth to the Lombard League, a military alliance of the major cities of Lombardy against Emperor Frederick Barbarossa.

For its conduct and work after the 1976 Friuli earthquake the battalion was awarded a Silver Medal of Army Valor, which was affixed to the battalion's flag and added to the battalion's coat of arms.

In 1979 the battalion disbanded two of its four companies. On 1 October 1986 the Armored Division "Ariete" was disbanded and two battalions were assigned to the 8th Mechanized Brigade "Garibaldi". On 10 October of the same year the 73rd Infantry Fortification Battalion "Lombardia" was disbanded and the flag of the 73rd Infantry Regiment "Lombardia" was transferred to the Shrine of the Flags in the Vittoriano in Rome. The battalion's base in Arzene and the maintenance of the fortifications along the Tagliamento river were taken over by the 120th Infantry Fortification Battalion "Fornovo".
