= Škrljevo =

Coordinates: 45°20′N 14°31′E

- Village
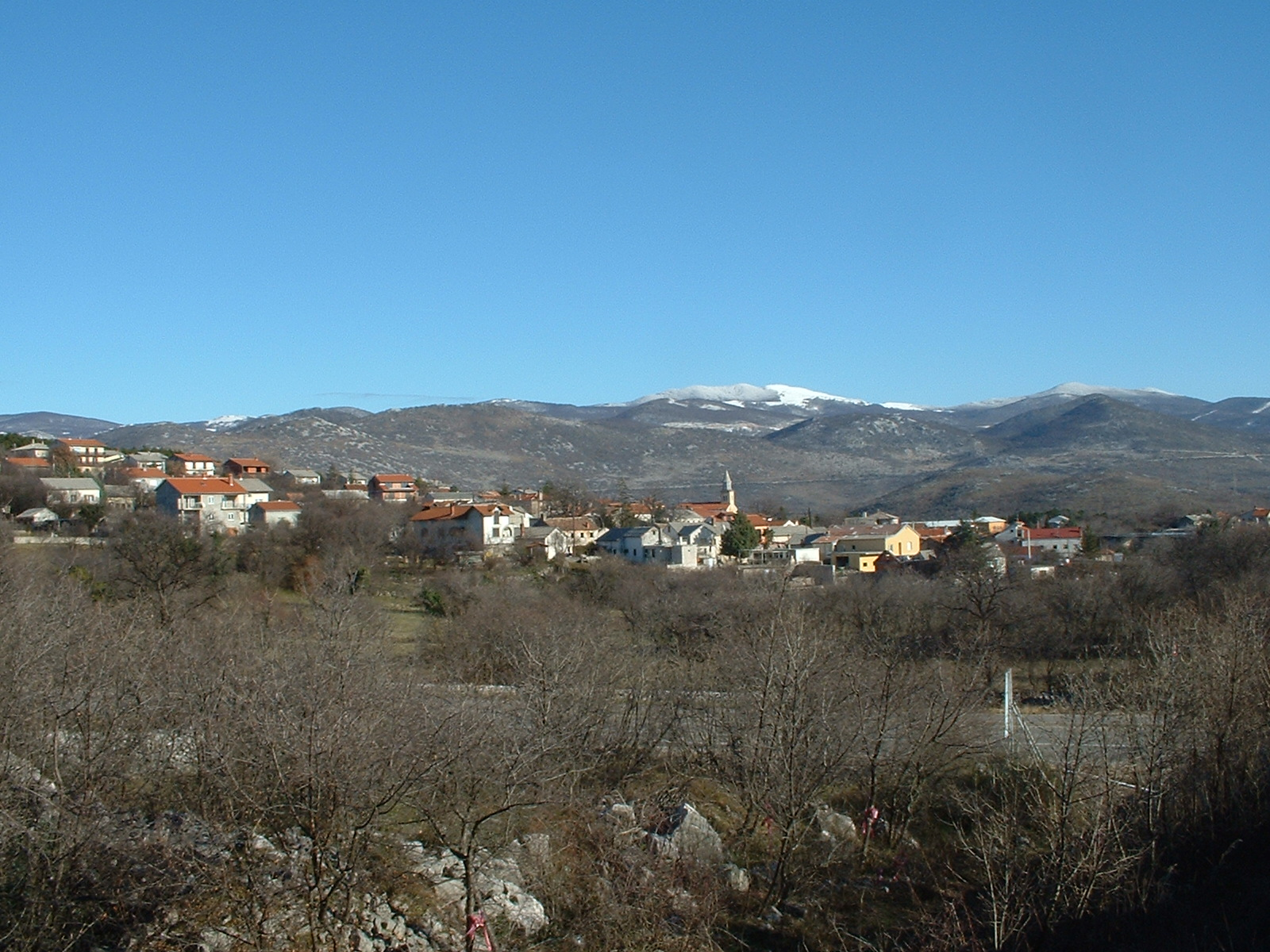
- Interactive map of Škrljevo
- Country: Croatia
- County: Primorje-Gorski Kotar County

Area
  - Total: 5.8 sq mi (15.0 km^{2})

Population (2021)
  - Total: 1,158
  - Density: 200/sq mi (77.2/km^{2})
- Time zone: UTC+1 (CET)
  - Summer (DST): UTC+2 (CEST)

Škrljevo is a village in Primorje, Croatia, located north of Bakar. The population is 1,344 (census 2011). Škrljevo was mentioned by name for the first time during the reign of Petar Zrinski, in a document from 1667. Near the railway station are the remains of the church of St. Ambroza, demolished in 1907.

== History ==
At 10:20 on 30 June 2019, the fire department JVP Rijeka received a call about a fire along the Škrljevo-Meja section of the railway. The fire had been started by sparks from a train, and spread over a large area despite the efforts of the JVP Rijeka under commander Hinko Mance combined with aid from volunteer fire departments of Škrljevo, Sušak, Drenova, Zlobin, Bakar, Kostrena and Čavle. At 12:34, two HV Canadairs had to be called in, arriving at 13:32. The fire was localised by 14:30, but 15 hectares (37 acres) burned.

== Governance ==
=== Local ===
It is the seat of the Local Committee of Škrljevo, encompassing itself and Plosna.

== Gallery ==
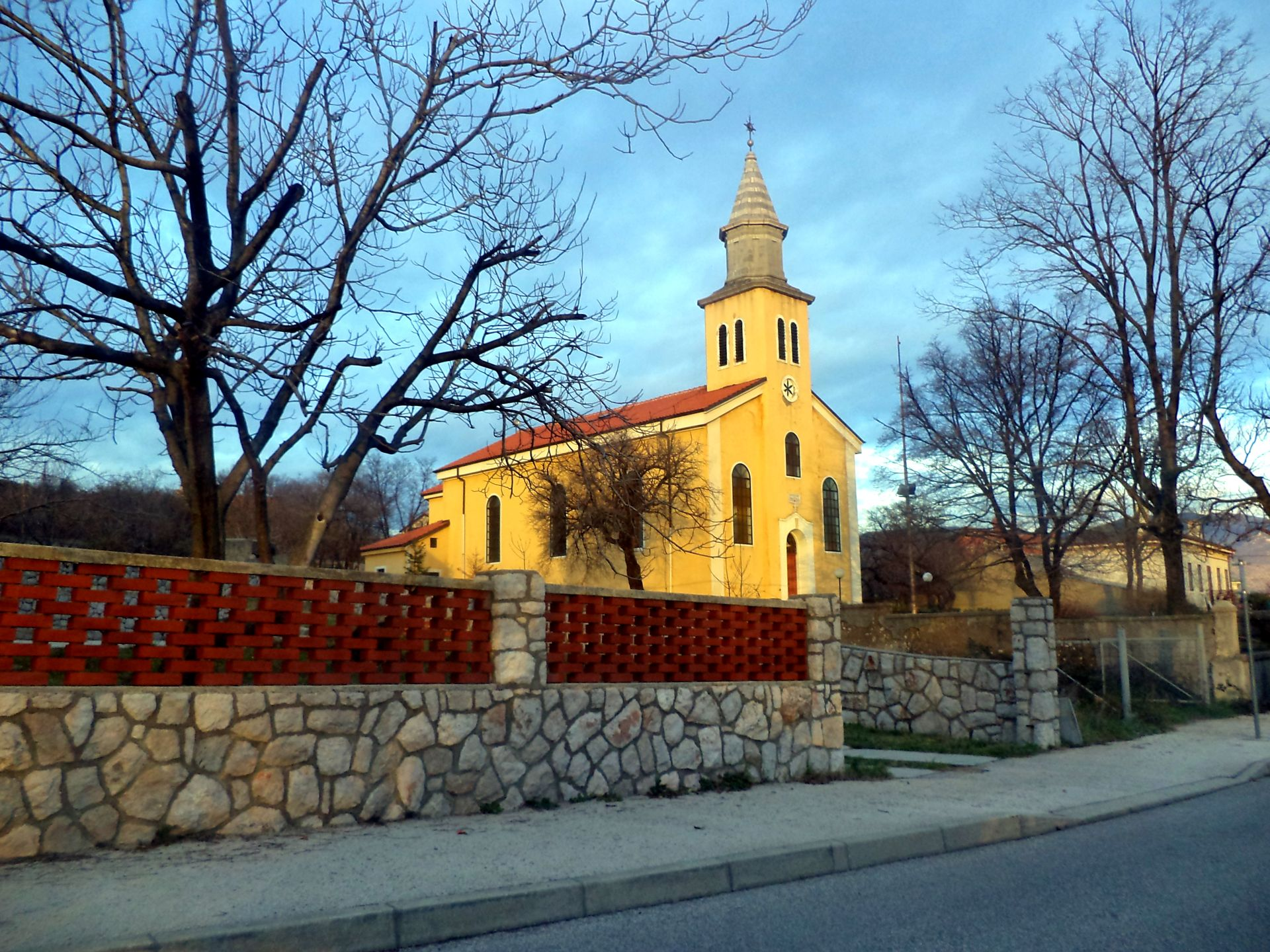
Presveto Srce Isusovo church

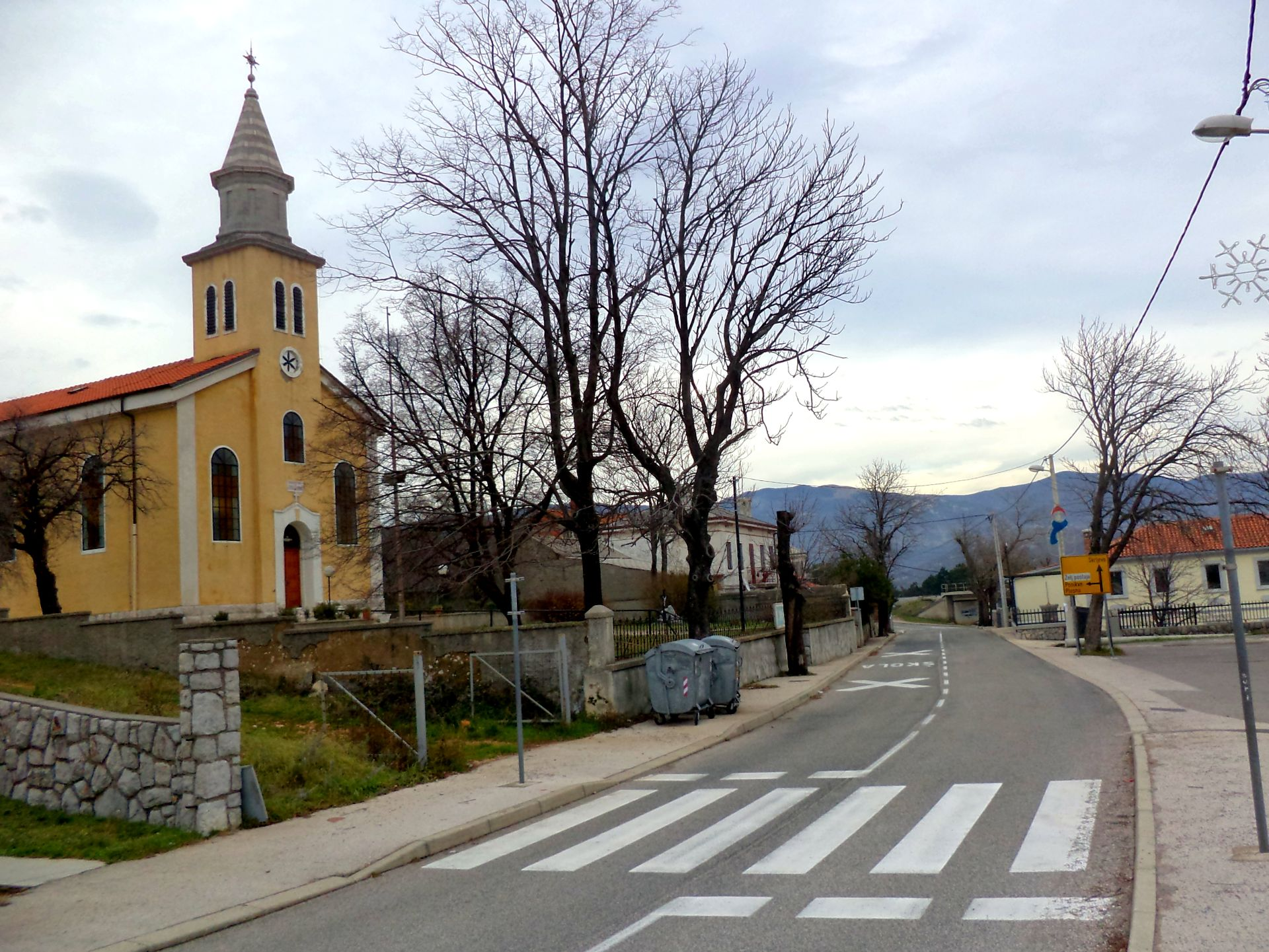
Main street

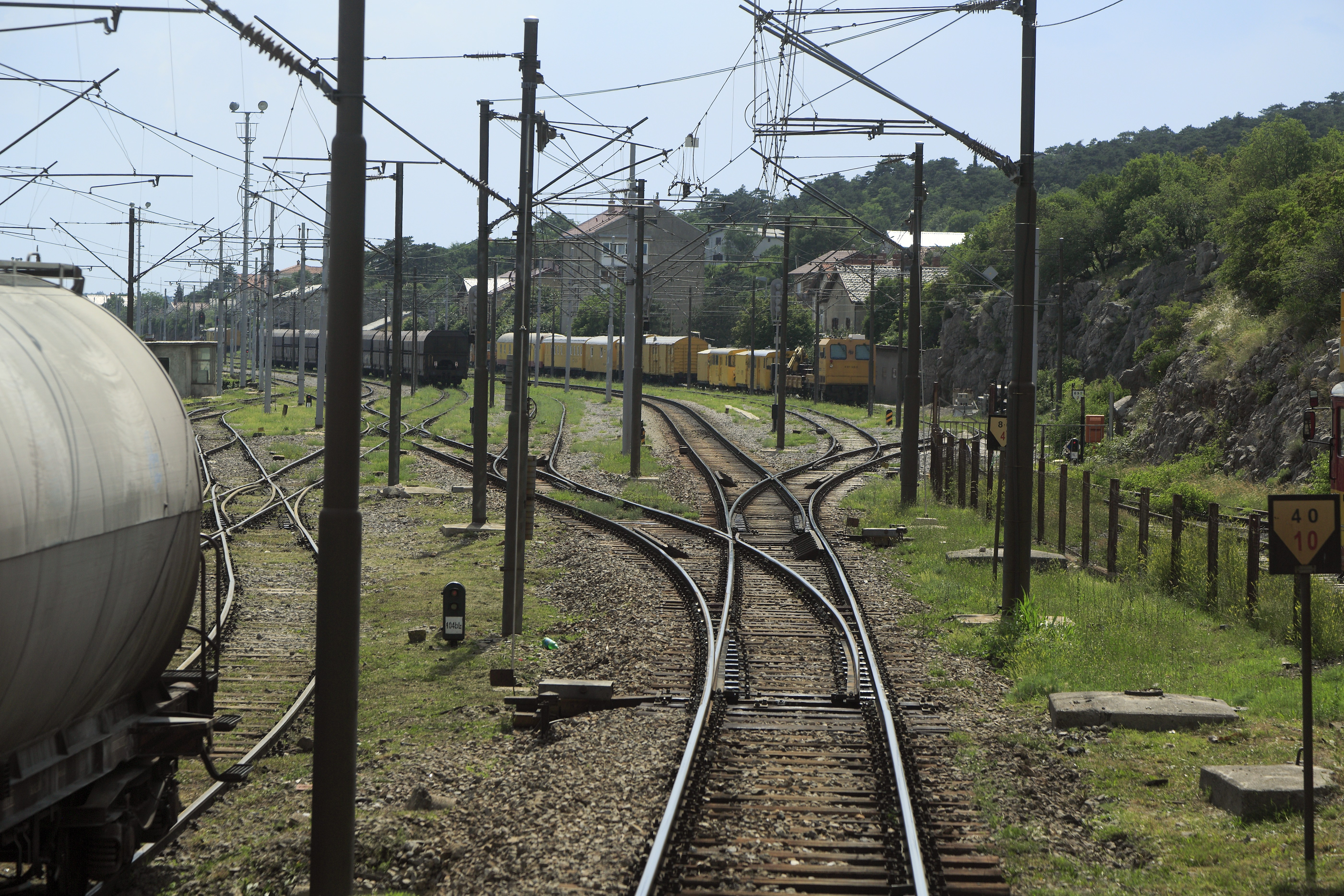
Train station
