= Plosna =

Village in Primorje-Gorski Kotar, Croatia

- Village
- Location within Croatia
- Coordinates: 45.34714°N 14.54422°E
- Country: Croatia
- County: Primorje-Gorski Kotar
- Town: Bakar

Area
  - Total: 13.6 km^{2} (5.3 sq mi)

Population (2021)
  - Total: 46
  - Density: 3.4/km^{2} (8.8/sq mi)
- Time zone: UTC+1 (CET)
  - Summer (DST): UTC+2 (CEST)
- Postal code: 51223
- Area code: 051
- Vehicle registration: RI

Plosna is a village in Primorje-Gorski Kotar, western Croatia. Administratively a part of the town of Bakar, it is located just to the north of Ponikve and 3 km to the north of Škrljevo. As of 2021, it had a population of 46.
