= Giovanni Esposito (general) =

Italian general (1882–1958)

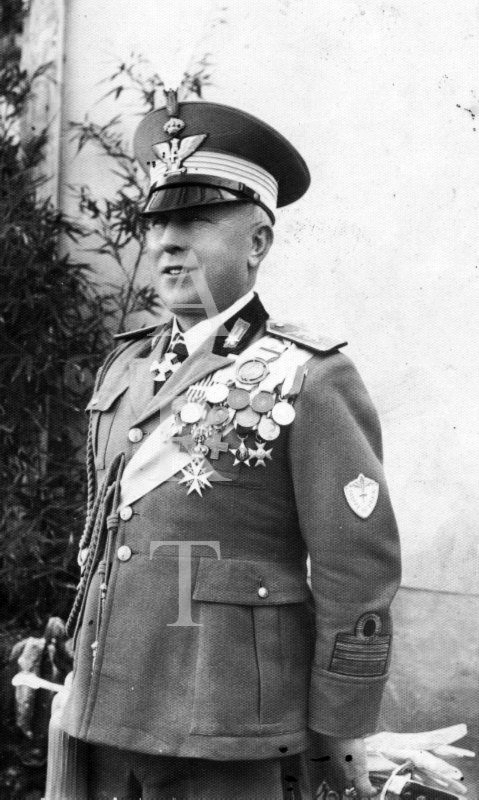
- Born: May 18, 1882; Loreto Aprutino, Kingdom of Italy
- Died: June 3, 1958 (aged 76); Rome, Italy
- Military career
- Allegiance: Kingdom of Italy; Italian Social Republic
- Branch: Royal Italian Army; National Republican Army
- Rank: Major General
- Commands: 56th Infantry Regiment "Marche"; 8th Alpini Regiment; Zara Garrison Troops Command; 28th Infantry Division "Vespri"; 57th Infantry Division "Lombardia"; 5th Alpine Division "Pusteria"; Territorial Defense of Trieste; 204th Regional Military Command
- Conflicts: Italo-Turkish War; World War I; White War; Battles of the Isonzo; Battle of Caporetto; Second Battle of the Piave River; World War II; Greco-Italian War; Uprising in Montenegro; Battle of Pljevlja; Operation Trio
- Awards: Gold Medal of Military Valor; Silver Medal of Military Valor; Bronze Medal of Military Valor (three times); War Cross of Military Valor; War Merit Cross; Military Order of Savoy; Order of the Crown of Italy

Giovanni Esposito (May 18, 1882 – June 3, 1958) was an Italian general during World War II and a recipient of the Gold Medal of Military Valor. He commanded the 5th Alpine Division "Pusteria" in 1941–1942, and the territorial defense of Trieste from 1943 to 1945, joining the Italian Social Republic.

== Biography ==
=== Early years ===
Esposito was born in Loreto Aprutino on May 18, 1882, the son of Giovanni Esposito di Zopito and Apollonia Acerbo.

He enlisted in the Royal Italian Army as a trainee sergeant assigned to the 36th Infantry Regiment. On October 31, 1904 he entered the Royal Military Academy of Modena and on September 14, 1906 he was appointed second lieutenant, assigned to the 5th Alpini Regiment, where he was promoted to lieutenant in September 1909.

After the outbreak of the Italo-Turkish War, on December 16, 1911 he landed in Derna with the "Edolo" Alpini Battalion, leading a bayonet charge. During a battle on December 27, while marching to re-enter the redoubts, he went back alone to rescue a wounded Alpino who was about to be captured by the enemy. During the battle of March 3, 1912 near the "Lombardia" redoubt, his battalion withstood an assault by superior Turkish-Arab forces; he distinguished himself during this action, keeping fighting even after being wounded in the leg and until he was hit again in the abdomen. For this he was awarded the Gold Medal of Military Valor. After recovering from his wounds, in October 1913 he began to attend the Army School of War, and was then promoted to captain and assigned to the 2nd Alpini Regiment.

=== World War I ===
After the entry of the Kingdom of Italy into the First World War on May 24, 1915, he distinguished himself with his regiment on the Croda Rossa, earning a Bronze Medal of Military Valor in the July, and on October 12 he was awarded another Bronze Medal for his behaviour during a heavy artillery shelling. He was then promoted to major and attached to the command of the 31st Division, and during 1917 he distinguished himself on the Isonzo front, being decorated with a third Bronze Medal for Military Valor for his role in destroying a bridge on the Isonzo during the retreat that followed the Battle of Caporetto. During the Second Battle of the Piave River he earned a War Cross for Military Valor.

=== Interwar years ===
After the war he joined the staff officer corps, and after promotion to colonel he assumed command of the 56th Infantry Regiment "Marche", subsequently transferring to that of the 8th Alpini Regiment deployed on the eastern frontier, and from January to September 1936 he commanded the Zara garrison (Comando Truppe del Presidio di Zara). From 1937, having been promoted to brigadier general for exceptional merit, he assumed command of the 28th Infantry Division "Vespri", and in 1939, after a period in command of the Milan Corps of the Guardia alla Frontiera, he transferred to that of the newly formed 57th Infantry Division "Lombardia", stationed in Pola.

=== World War II ===
In May 1940 he was promoted to major general and on January 14, 1941 he was appointed commander of the 5th Alpine Division "Pusteria", fighting in the Greek campaign, relieving General Amedeo De Cia. He led the division during the harsh winter spent on the Tomorr, the bloody fighting on Mali Spadarit and Selami, and finally the advance into Greek territory towards Konitsa at the end of the campaign; for this he was awarded the Knight's Cross of the Military Order of Savoy.

In July 1941 the "Pusteria" were transferred to Montenegro, participating in the repression of the uprising that had broken out at dawn on July 14. The division went into action on July 16, together with Blackshirt units, attacking the partisan stronghold of Linbotin. The repression was brutal, leading to the rapid capitulation of the rebels. The columns of the Alpini and other Italian units fought relentlessly between the Adriatic Sea and Lake Scutari, and in a few days the encircled garrisons were freed and roads made safe. The "Pusteria" then set up headquarters in Pljevlja, where in early December 1941 in the Battle of Pljevlja it repelled a heavy partisan attack led by Arso Jovanović. Esposito decided to punish population, especially Orthodox population, for supporting the uprising in order to prevent future uprisings: destruction of partisan controlled civilian objects in Pljevlja, killing of all captured partisans but 2, executing citizens for smallest suspicion of connection with Partisans (31 executed, 30 were Orthodox, 1 was Muslim) and reprisals in near-by villages, such as killing of 38 people in Crljenice.

Following the victory in Pljevlja, Esposito often sent his troops in interior of region of control, which was uncommon for Italian units, which mostly stayed in garrisons. After killing of collaborationist Chetnik leader in Krnjača on January 26, Italian Army went to arrest all adult males from the village and steal cattle, however population already fled. Italians still significant inflicted material damage to the village. On January 31 Italian Army raided village Vrulja killing 3 Partisans. Next target was Kruševo which unit attacked with legalized Chetniks from Pljevlja and was razed completely. Following fight with Partisans similar fate happened to Vrbica.

In April 1942, to effectively counter the escalation in attacks carried out by the Yugoslav partisans, the command of the Italian 2nd Army conducted a joint "police" operation with the German Command in Yugoslavia, codenamed Operation Trio, in Bosnia. During this operation, the "Pusteria" participated in bitter fighting against the partisans in the Drina region. After the end of the operation, Esposito was repatriated with his division, awarded a Silver Medal of Military Valor, and transferred to the Army reserve on May 18, 1942, but appointed Inspector of the Alpine Troops in Rome.

In May 1943, with the worsening of the Italian war situation, he was assigned the Territorial Defense Command of Trieste, of which he became commander in July.

At the time of the proclamation of the Armistice of Cassibile on September 8, 1943, the Julian March was defended by the XXIII Army Corps of General Alberto Ferrero, who refused to fight against the Germans, declaring Trieste indefensible. Ferrero transferred his command to Cervignano, leaving Esposito in command of Trieste, which was occupied by German troops without opposition. At 18:00 on September 10, Esposito signed the transfer of civil and military powers to the German Operational Zone of the Adriatic Littoral at his headquarters in Villa Necker. He later joined the Italian Social Republic, retaining command of the territorial defense of Trieste and being appointed regional commander of the National Republican Army (204th Regional Military Command).

=== Trial, imprisonment and later years ===
After the war, with the occupation of Trieste by the Allies, Esposito was immediately imprisoned, undergoing his first interrogation by the Allied Police Command on June 14, 1945. He was then tried for collaboration; the trial took place between April and May 1946, and after eight sessions he was sentenced to thirty years in prison. Due to the changed political situation, the Allied Military Government decided to transfer all Italian political prisoners to the Supreme Military Court of Rome. Esposito was therefore transferred to the Civitavecchia prison.

In December 1948 the Court of Cassation halved his sentence to fifteen years in prison. He was released in January 1949 following the Togliatti amnesty, and retired to private life. His name was included in a list of war criminals wanted by Yugoslavia, but he was never extradited.

Having been reinstated in his rank in 1956, he died in Rome on June 3, 1958.

== Sources ==
- Živković, Milutin D. (2017). Санџак 1941–1943 [Sandžak 1941–1943] (Doctoral) (in Serbo-Croatian). Belgrade: University of Belgrade. OCLC 1242119546.
