= Drenova, Rijeka =

Drenova
- Local board
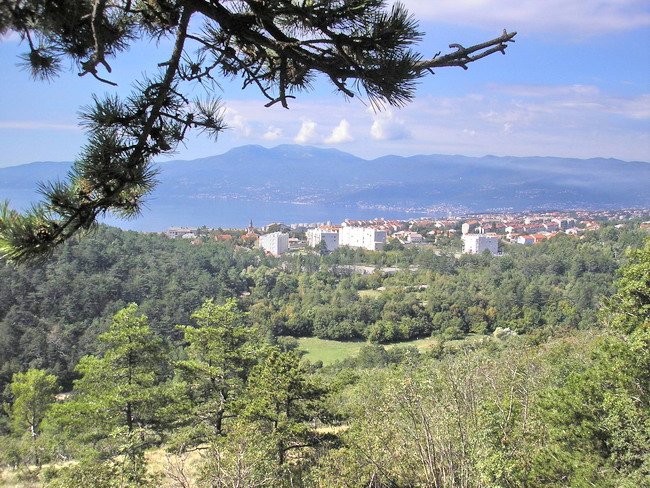
- Drenova and Rijeka
- Motto: Green lungs of the city
- Location of Drenova within Croatia
- Coordinates: 45°21′12″N 14°25′52″E
- Country: Croatia
- County: Primorje-Gorski Kotar County
- City: Rijeka

Area
  - Total: 7 km^{2} (2.7 sq mi)
- Elevation: 300 m (980 ft)

Population (2011)
  - Total: 7,624
  - Density: 1,100/km^{2} (2,800/sq mi)
- Time zone: UTC+1 (CET)
  - Summer (DST): UTC+2 (CEST)
- Postal code: 51000
- Area code: 051
- Website: drenova.hr

Drenova is a neighbourhood and a local board of the city of Rijeka, Croatia perched on a plateau above the city. Historically there were two parts: Gornja (Upper) Drenova and Donja (Lower) Drenova, nowadays united in one. Drenova has the largest cemetery and park area of the city. The motto of the local board is "Drenova - green lung of the city".

== Geography ==
Drenova is located above Rijeka and includes a plateau and the area bordered in the north with Rječina river and districts of Brašćine-Pulac and Pašac in the east, Škurinje in the west, Škurinjska Draga in the south. Drenova is also bordered with the municipalities: Viškovo in the northwest, Jelenje in the north and Čavle in the east.

== Population ==
According to the 2011 census, Drenova has 7,624 inhabitants.

== The Council of the Local Board ==
The Council of the Local Board has seven members, and the President is Saša Jurešić (SDP, HNS, PGS, SDSS).

== History ==
The settlement Drenova originated approximately 300 to 400 years ago. There were formed hamlets Podbreg, Macani, Klanjac, Kablari, Brdina and others. The residents of these small, scattered settlements were called Drenovčani. The name was derived from the cornel (dren), the forest fruit, which grows in the Drenova's forests.

The settlement stretched from today's Shooting range to Benčani and covered the area of Lopača, by the Rječina valley including Grohovo.

Significant year in the history of Drenova, especially for the literacy of the inhabitants, is certainly in 1838 when the vicar Ivan Cvetko founded a church parish and began to gather and teach the children. By his advocacy in 1844 began construction of a school that was completed and start working in 1852.

By the new City Statut in 1872 Drenova becomes a municipality, and the citizens of Drenova equal in rights and duties with the citizens of Rijeka.

Significant persons who attended Drenova's school are: writer and journalist Ivo Grohovac Riječanin and Fran_Franković, father of teaching and education of Istria, professor and director of the Teacher's School in Kastav, professor at the Teacher's School in Kopar, author of the first Croatian Spelling Book issued in Vienna in 1911, founder of the Croatian Public Reading Room on Drenova in 1908.

Under the Roman Treaty of 1924, Drenova was divided by the border. This division created the localities of Donja and Gornja Drenova, whose names have been preserved until today. Donja (lok. Dolnja) Drenova was part of Italy and Gornja Drenova of Yugoslavia at that time.

Because of division, Gornja Drenova remained without school, church, cemetery and many people employed in Italian Rijeka without work and bread. People from Gornja Drenova wanted - if they were already separated from Rijeka - to be associated to Sušak, which was also part of Yugoslavia. But, at the end Gornja Drenova was joined to Kastav.

In the period before and after the First World War, in the time of political struggles around Rijeka, the work of the Drenova's Public Reading Room played an important role in gathering locals and spreading activities in culture as well as in preserving national consciousness.

The work of the elementary school in Gornja Drenova began in 1924 in the private house of Fran Franković (Tonići) and in 1930 a new school was built at Tunić, in which the distinguished teacher Ivan Ribarić - Istranin worked. The school worked until the beginning of World War II. The Germans burned it in 1943. In 1929, the old idea and desire of Drenovčani was realized and the National House in Lokva was built, which became the center of Drenova's cultural and national life.

With intense social housing construction in the late 1970s, Drenova became urban and residential area within Rijeka.
