= Polić =

Polić (Serbian Cyrillic: Полић) is a Serbo-Croatian surname, worn by ethnic Croats and Serbs, found in the former Yugoslav republics of Bosnia and Herzegovina, Croatia, Montenegro and Serbia. The surname may refer to:

- Gordana–Nadežda Polić, known as Ana Bekuta (born 1959), Serbian singer
- Vladimir Polić (1916–1972), Yugoslav waterpolo player
- Antica Polić, Croatian and Indian swimmer and swimming coach
- Damir Polić, Croatian water polo player
- Dora Polić (born 1971), Croatian actress
- Ladislav Polić (1874–1874), Croatian lawyer and politician
- Mate Polić (1843–1917), Croatian shipowner
- Milutin Polić (1883–1908), Croatian composer
- Nikola Polić (poet) (1890–1960), Croatian poet
- Nikola Polić (journalist) (1842–1902), Croatian journalist
- Janko Polić Kamov (1886–1910), Croatian writer

== See also ==
- Poljić, surname
- Palić, surname
- Pelić, surname
- Pilić, surname
- Pulić, surname
