= Nikola Polić =

Nikola Polić may refer to:

- Nikola Polić (poet) (1890–1960), Croatian poet
- Nikola Polić (journalist) (1842–1902), Croatian journalist
