= Church of Saint Matthew, Tovarnik =

Church of Saint Matthew
- Crkva svetog Mateja
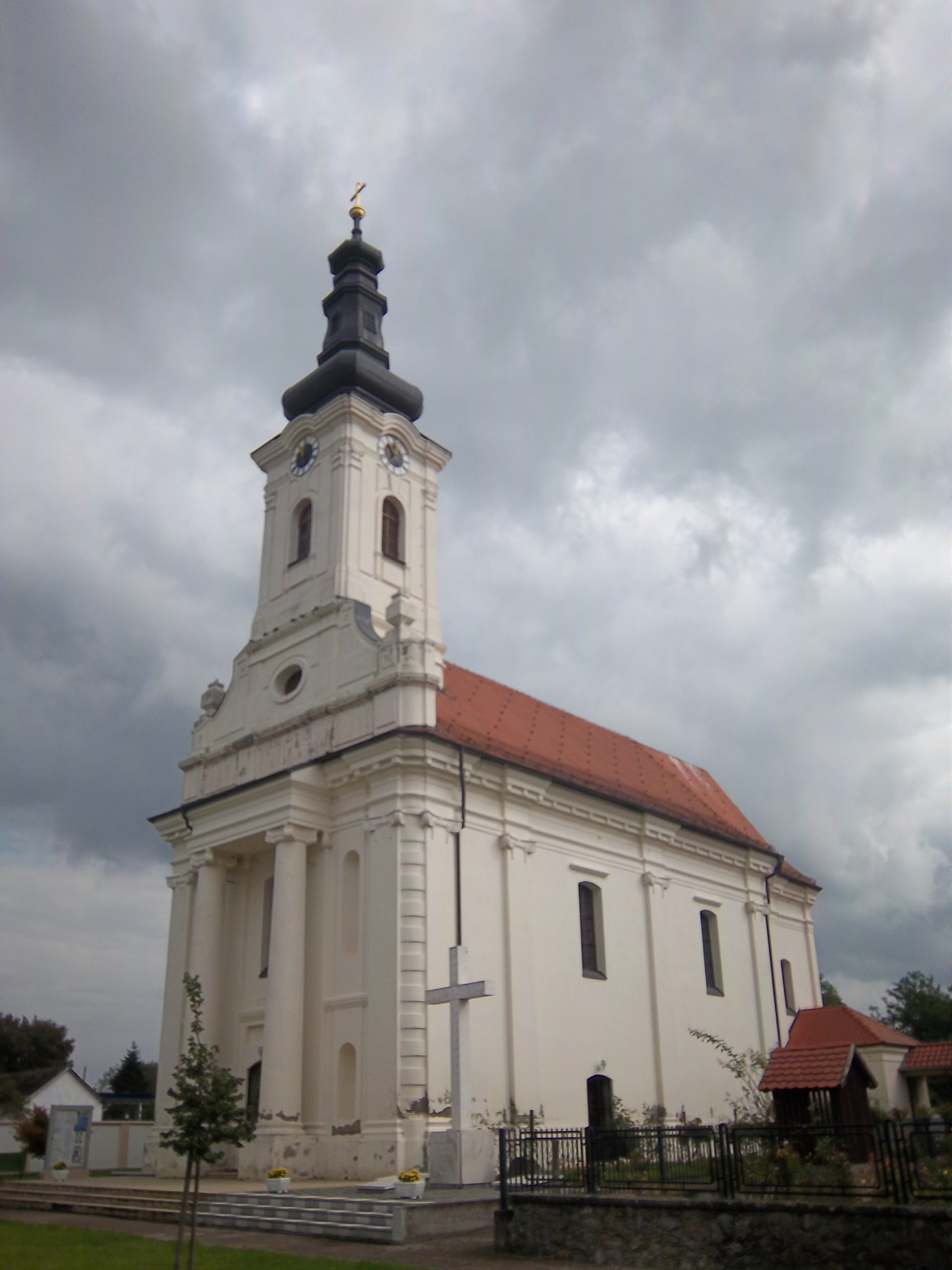
- Church of Saint Matthew
- Location: Tovarnik
- Country: Croatia
- Denomination: Roman Catholic

History
- Dedication: Matthew the Apostle

Administration
- Metropolis: Metropolis of Đakovo-Osijek
- Archdiocese: Archdiocese of Đakovo-Osijek
- Deanery: Vukovar Deanery

The Church of Saint Matthew (Croatian: Crkva svetog Mateja) in Tovarnik is a Roman Catholic church in eastern Croatia. The parish priest Ivan Burik was the only Roman Catholic priest who was killed during the Croatian War of Independence. In the first half 2008 the Government of the Republic of Croatia provided 150,000 Croatian Kuna for completion of the reconstruction of the church. The tower of the Church of Saint Matthew is 40 meters high.

== See also ==
- Ilača apparitions
- Church of St. George, Tovarnik
