= Palic (disambiguation) =

Palić is a town in Serbia.

Palić or Palic may also refer to:

- FK Palić, football club based in Palić, Serbia
- Lake Palić, Serbia

== Surname ==
- Palić (surname)
- Dave Palic, American football player
