= Polic =

Polic can refer to:

- Polić, a surname
- Polic, an imprint of VDM Publishing
