= Tovarnik =

- Municipality
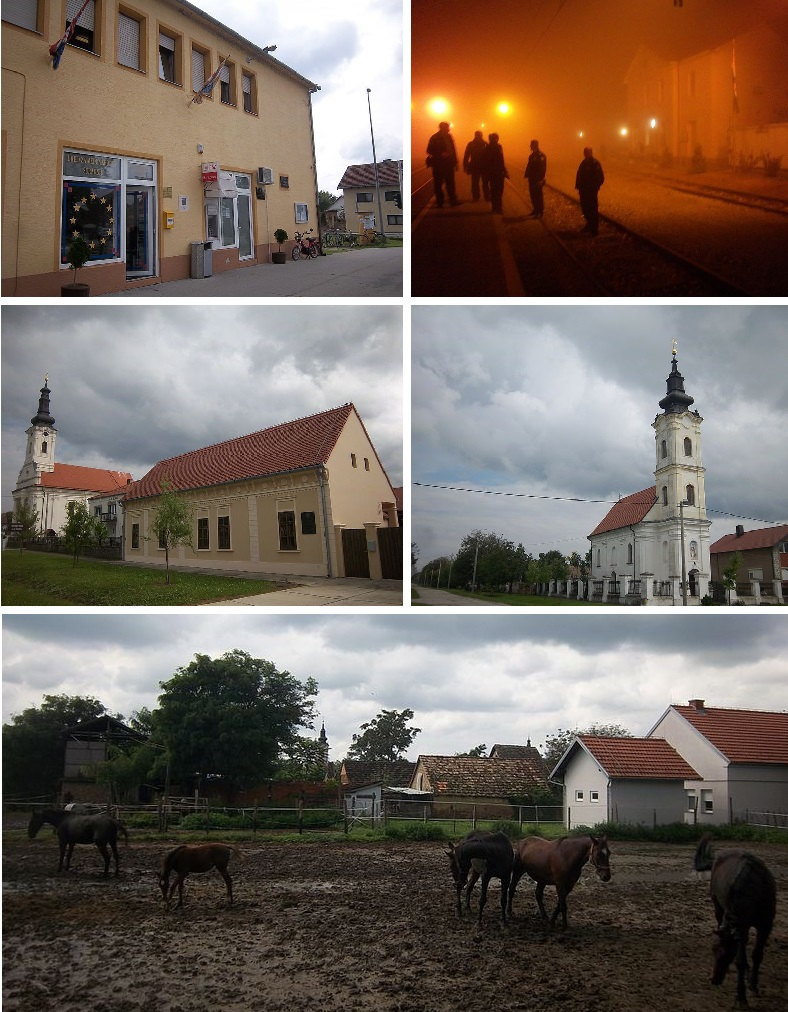
- Clockwise, from top right: Tovarnik railway station, Serbian Orthodox Church of St. George, stable, Roman Catholic Church of Saint Matthew, Birthplace of Antun Gustav Matoš and Municipal building

- Flag Seal

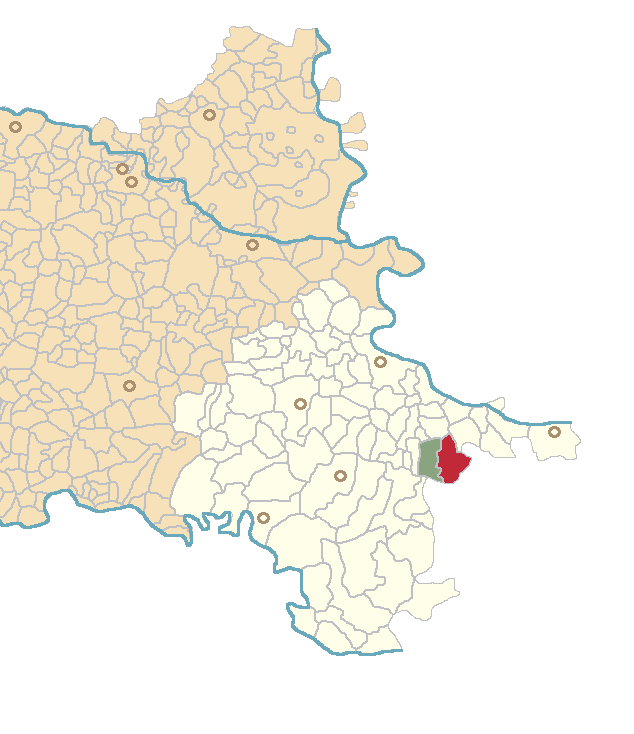

- Location in Croatia Tovarnik (Croatia) Tovarnik (Europe)
- Coordinates: 45°10′N 19°9′E
- Country: Croatia
- Region: Syrmia (Podunavlje)
- County: Vukovar-Syrmia County

Government
  - Municipal mayor: Hamja (HDZ )

Area
  - Municipality: 64.5 km^{2} (24.9 sq mi)
  - Urban: 37.9 km^{2} (14.6 sq mi)

Population (2021)
  - Municipality: 2,067
  - Density: 32.0/km^{2} (83.0/sq mi)
  - Urban: 1,385
  - Urban density: 36.5/km^{2} (94.6/sq mi)
- Demonym(s): Tovarničanin (♂) Tovarničanka (♀) (per grammatical gender)
- Time zone: UTC+1 (CET)
  - Summer (DST): UTC+2 (CEST)
- Postal code: 32249
- Area code: 32
- Vehicle registration: VU
- Website: opcina-tovarnik.hr

Tovarnik (pronounced [tǒvaːrniːk], Hungarian: Felsőtárnok, German: Sankt Georg, Latin: Ulmo) is a municipality in the Vukovar-Syrmia County in Croatia next to the border with Serbia with the town of Šid and the village of Ilinci on the other side of the border. According to the 2001 census, there are 2,775 inhabitants, 91.06% which are Croats. The municipality is part of Syrmia. It is the birthplace of great Croatian poet Antun Gustav Matoš. Tovarnik is underdeveloped municipality which is statistically classified as the First Category Area of Special State Concern by the Government of Croatia.

== Geography ==
The municipality is located in historical regions of Syrmia. The total area of the municipality is 64.56 km^{2}. The territory of the municipality is completely flat with very fertile black soil. The municipality shares borders with municipalities of Lovas to north, Tompojevci to northwest, Nijemci to west and southwest and the Republic of Serbia to south, east and north-east where it borders the town of Šid. The village is connected with the rest of the country by the D46 state road connecting it with the town of Vinkovci and continuing into Serbia as the State Road 120 to the nearest town of Šid.

=== Climate and weather ===
Tovarnik municipality has a moderately warm and rainy continental climate as defined by the Köppen climate classification. Due to the influence of continentality temperature differences within one year are more pronounced than in the rest of country.

== Demographics ==
With pronounced issue of population decline in eastern Croatia caused by population ageing, effects of the Croatian War of Independence and emigration after the accession of Croatia to the European Union, the population of the municipality dropped to 2,067 residents at the time of 2021 census.

== Politics ==
=== Minority councils ===
Directly elected minority councils and representatives are tasked with consulting tasks for the local or regional authorities in which they are advocating for minority rights and interests, integration into public life and participation in the management of local affairs. At the 2023 Croatian national minorities councils and representatives elections Serbs of Croatia fulfilled legal requirements to elect 10 members minority councils of the Tovarnik Municipality with Serb community electing only 6 members to the body in the end.

== History ==
=== Ancient history ===
During the classical time the settlement called Ulmo existed at the place of modern-day Tovarnik in what was then Roman province Pannonia Secunda.

=== Medieval and early modern history ===
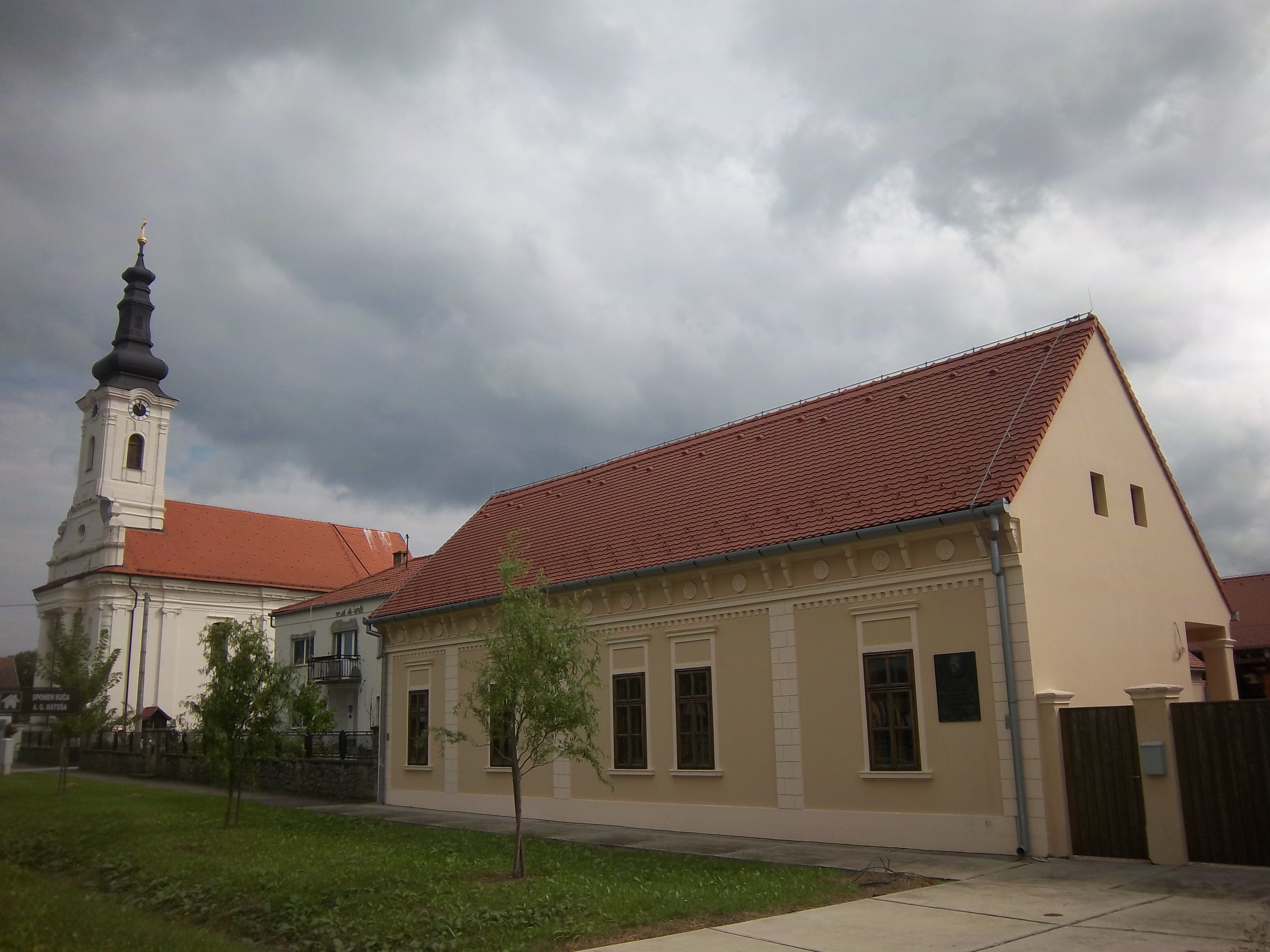
Birth-house of Antun Gustav Matoš

The contemporary settlement was firstly mentioned in 1335. The village was known as Tabornik but the name was changed into Tovarnik by Eastern Orthodox settlers who moved into the village after the Ottoman conquest of the region. Catholic religious document from 1632 states that the village is inhabited not only by Catholic population but by Turks and Orthodox who altogether live in 30 houses on the road which connects Belgrade and Istanbul with Budapest. Following Ottoman retreat from the region, the Lordship of Vukovar was established, and the village became part of its domain. On 28 March 1737 the village was purchased by the House of Eltz. The local school was opened in 1758, post office in 1826 and the Tovarnik railway station in 1890. In 1894 local Croat Reading House was established as well.

=== Kingdom of Yugoslavia ===
Within the Kingdom of Yugoslavia Tovarnik war administratively part of Šid Srez firstly within the pre-Yugoslav the Syrmia County (up to 1922), the Syrmia Oblast (1922–1929), after that the Danube Banovina (1929–1939) and ultimately the Banovina of Croatia (1939-1941).

=== World War II ===
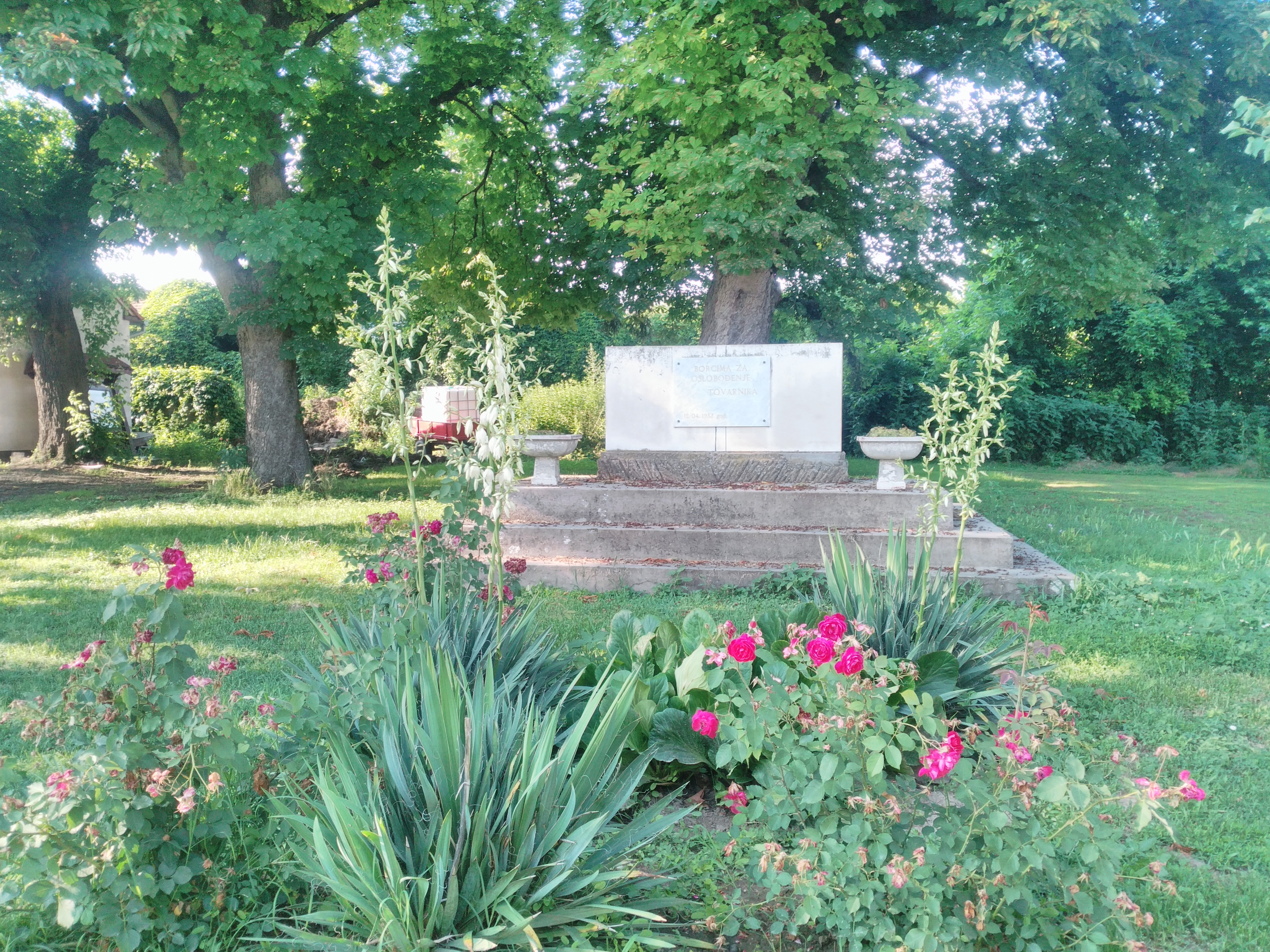
Monument to the liberators of Tovarnik (from 1953).

During the World War II Tovarnik was a part of Independent State of Croatia, a puppet state led by the fascist Ustaša organization which at the time ruled the entire Syrmia region and implemented genocide of Serbs on its territory. The historical Serb village of Ivanci, which was located south of Ilača, was completely destroyed on 30 November 1943 while 73 inhabitants were murdered in half an hour by Nazi German forces. The village of Ivanci was center of the Yugoslav Partisans in Syrmia with established local branches of Women's Antifascist Front of Yugoslavia and League of Communist Youth of Yugoslavia. Surviving villagers found rescue in Šidski Banovci, Tovarnik and Ilača. After the Syrmian Front broke through on 12 April 1945 local Danube Swabians and some Croats in Tovarnik (51 in total) were exposed to a wave of executions of suspected collaborators who were executed by being pushed from the tower of the Church of St. George. Protestant Danube Swabians from Šidski Banovci were expelled despite the fact that they helped to save survivors from Ivanci and were more protective of local Orthodox population than Catholic Danube Swabians.

=== Socialist Yugoslavia ===
Some minor issues regarding the border between the Autonomous Province of Vojvodina, a part of the Socialist Republic of Serbia, and Socialist Republic of Croatia were left unresolved by the Anti-Fascist Council for the National Liberation of Yugoslavia on 24 February 1945. In order to settle the matter, the federal authorities set up a five-member commission presided over by Milovan Đilas in June 1945. As one of disputed territories District of Šid was identified. Commission concluded that District of Šid, with Tovarnik as a part of it at the time, shall become a part of the Autonomous Province of Vojvodina. Commission's demarcation was partially changed in several instances including in the case of District of Šid where Tovarnik, Ilača and Šidski Banovci were subsequently transferred to the Socialist Republic of Croatia. In 1960-1962 the general land management project was completed enabling drained of a couple of curlers and subsequent agricultural use of the land.

=== Croatian War of Independence ===
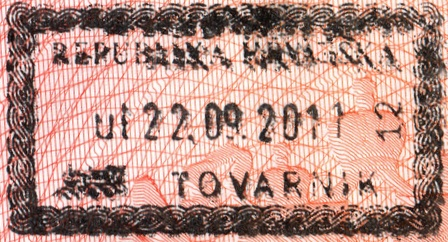
Passport stamp from the border with Serbia.

At the time of March 1991 Croatian census out of total 3001 inhabitants of Tovarnik there was 2136 (71,2%) Croats, 670 (22,3%) Serbs, 105 Yugoslavs and 90 members of other groups.

During the Croatian War of Independence, Tovarnik was attacked and captured by the JNA and Serb rebels on 22 September 1991, a total of 80 Croat civilians were killed by Serb forces during and after Serb forces attacked and occupied the village. Serb forces had expelled 95% of the 2,500 Croat inhabitants by the end of 1991 and had destroyed 75% of the homes and buildings in the village.

=== UNTAES protectorate ===
After the signing of the Erdut Agreement in 1995 between the authorities of the Republic of Croatia and the local Serb authorities of the self-proclaimed Eastern Slavonia, Baranja and Western Syrmia the region came under the direct administration of the United Nations Transitional Administration for Eastern Slavonia, Baranja and Western Sirmium which lasted for two years between 1996 and the beginning of 1998.

=== European migrant or refugee crisis ===
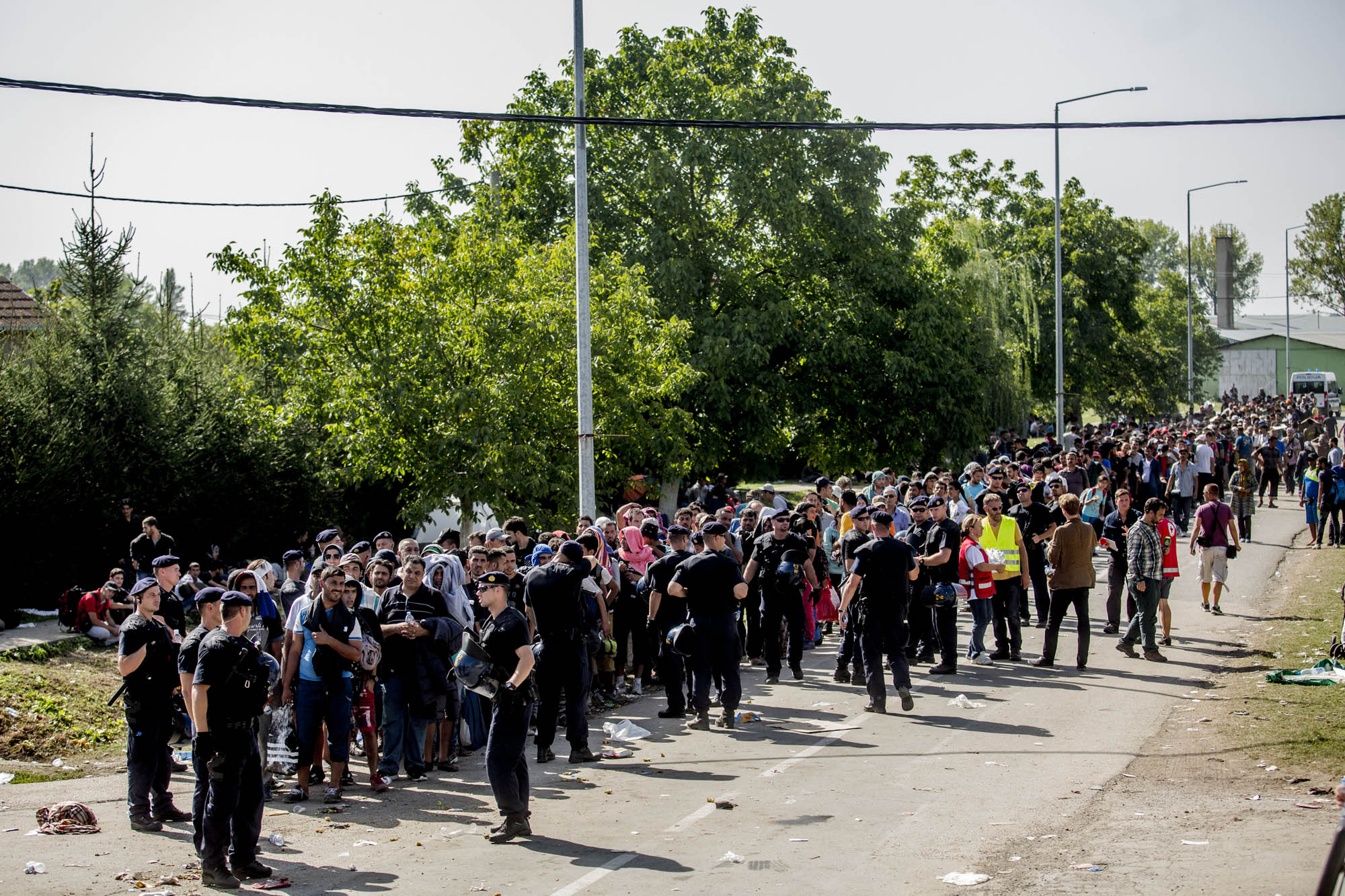
Early days of the movement via Croatia.

The village of Tovarnik is located next to the border with Serbia. While nearly 80% of the border consist of the Danube river, there is a 70 kilometers-long so-called "Green Border" near Tovarnik which at the time of the so-called crisis enabled the easier entrance for migrants and/or refugees from Serbia, especially ever since Hungary erected a fence on its border with Serbia. Parts of the Croatia-Serbia border are known minefields from the Croatian War of Independence period, which represent a considerable threat for unfamiliar individuals. According to the Croatian Minister of Interior Ranko Ostojić, police in the area have enough people and equipment to protect the Croatian border against undocumented border crossings removing the need for fence. Croatian President Kolinda Grabar-Kitarović and First Deputy Prime Minister Vesna Pusić have also rejected the option of building a fence along the Croatian border with Serbia. Croatian Prime Minister Zoran Milanović said his country is ready to help refugees coming to Europe, insisting that people fleeing conflict should be given the right to remain in the EU.

On 15 September 2015, first major waves of refugees from the Syrian Civil War crossed the Croatian border as it was a new main route after Hungary seals borders. On September 15, 2015, Hungary announced it would start arresting people crossing the border illegally, and as of early 16 September, Hungary had detained 519 people and pressed criminal charges against 46 for trespassing. Thousands of migrants were subsequently led to pursue alternative routes through Croatia from Serbia. After Hungary closed its border with Serbia on September 15, refugees headed towards the Serbian town of Šid, less than 10 kilometers from the Croatian border. Several buses filled with refugees arrived on the Croatian border crossing of Tovarnik, where the Croatian Vukovar-Syrmia County Care and Rescue teams as well as the Croatian Red Cross were on standby awaiting them. On September 17 at 3:30 AM, more than 5,000 individuals have arrived in Tovarnik. Since the number of refugees is rising and expected to peak at 20,000, it is likely that they will be moved to Zagreb Fair as planned. Interior Minister Ranko Ostojić said Croatia is "absolutely full" by the evening of 17 September 2015, and Croatia decided to close its border with Serbia.

=== Contemporary Period ===
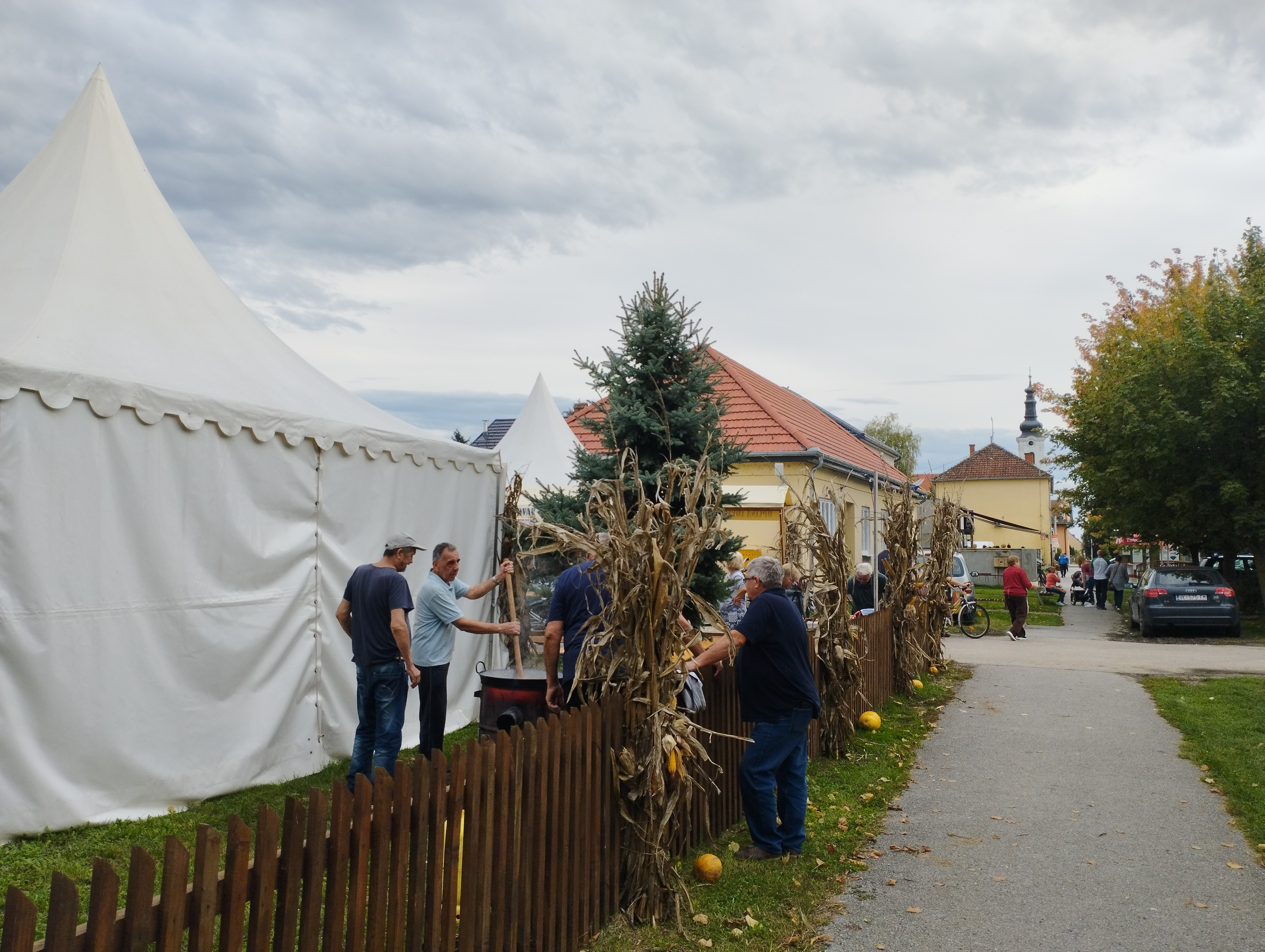
Tovarnik Autumn Festival 2022

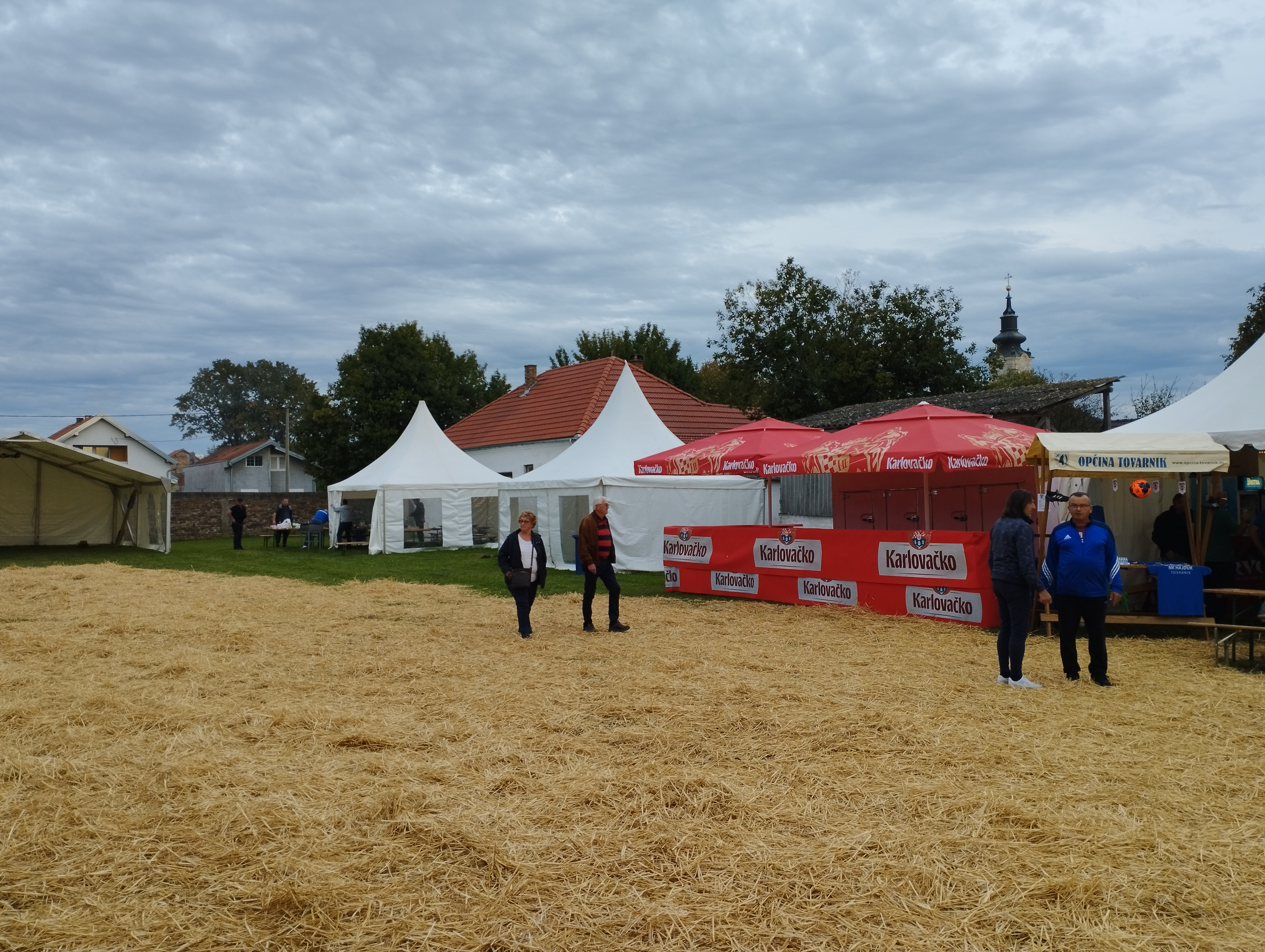
Tovarnik Autumn Festival 2022

In early 2019 villages of Tovarnik, Ilača and Banovci organized joint demonstrations against truck drivers from countries other than Croatia and Serbia which are causing heavy traffic congestion on the D46 road while waiting to cross the state border between Croatia and Serbia. Citizens requested redirection of all truck transportation, with the exception of Croatian and Serbian trucks traveling to one or the other state, to be removed from the D46 road and redirected to A3 motorway.

== Gallery ==
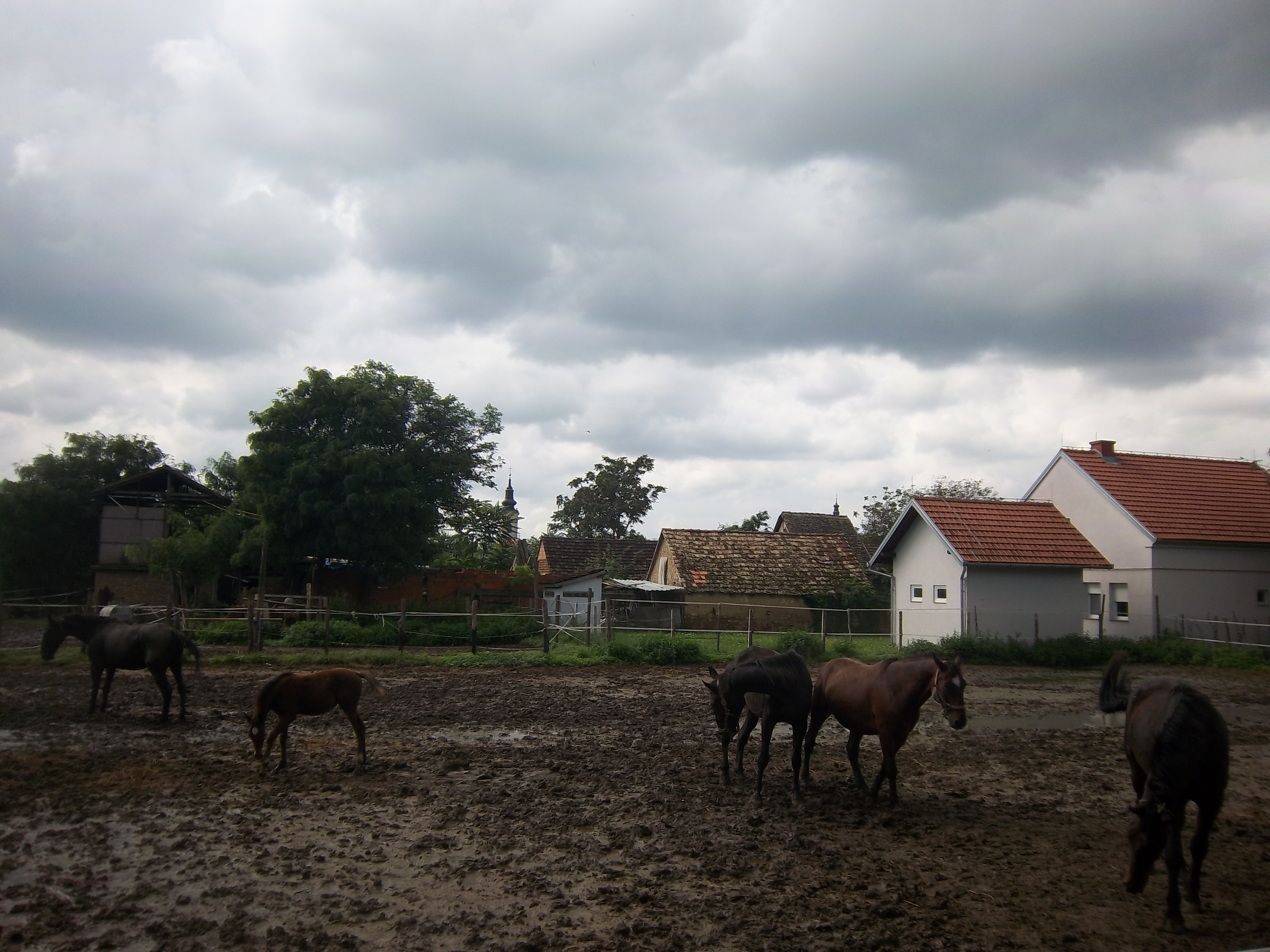

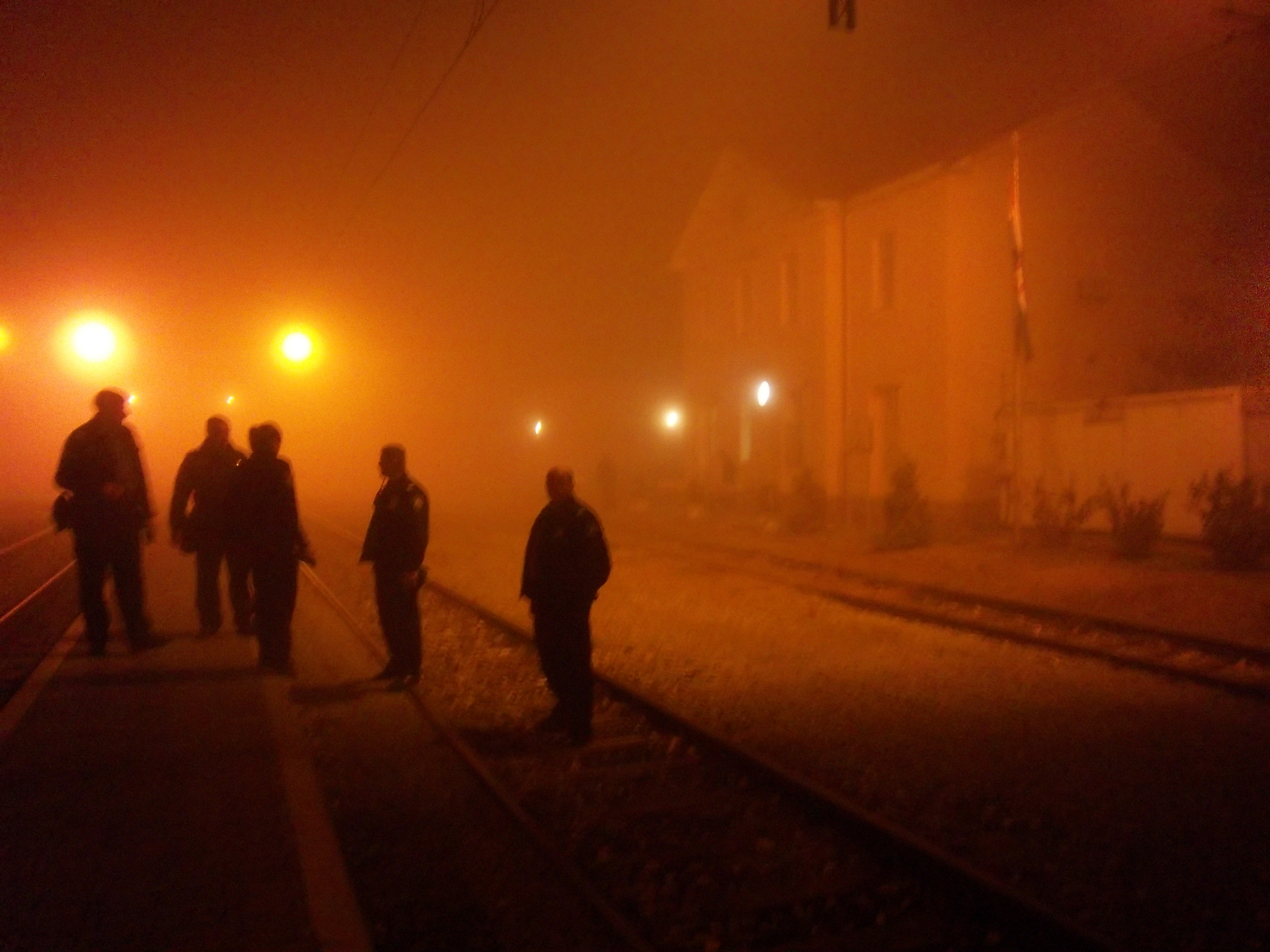
Railway station Tovarnik

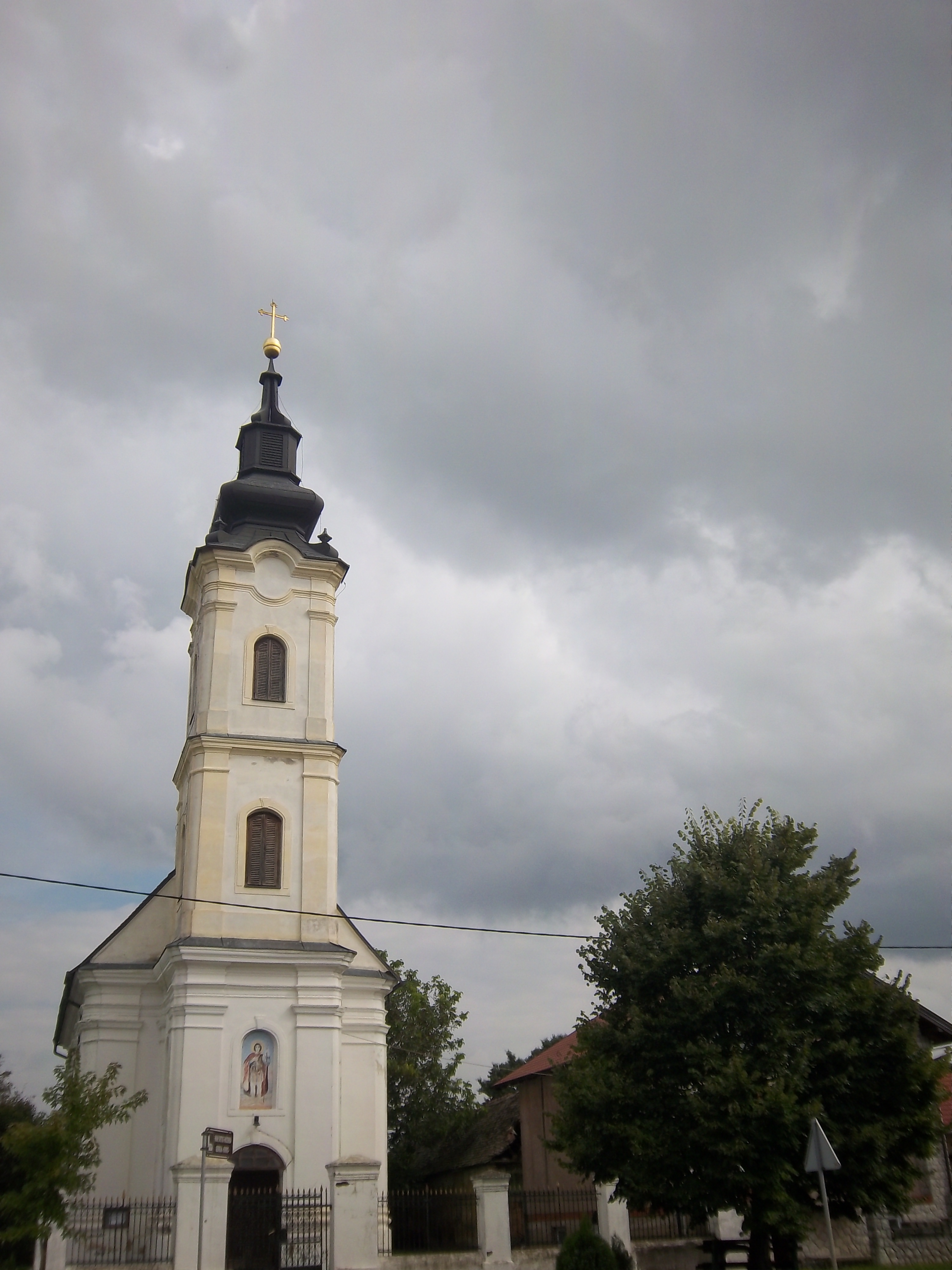
Serbian Orthodox church of St. George, Tovarnik

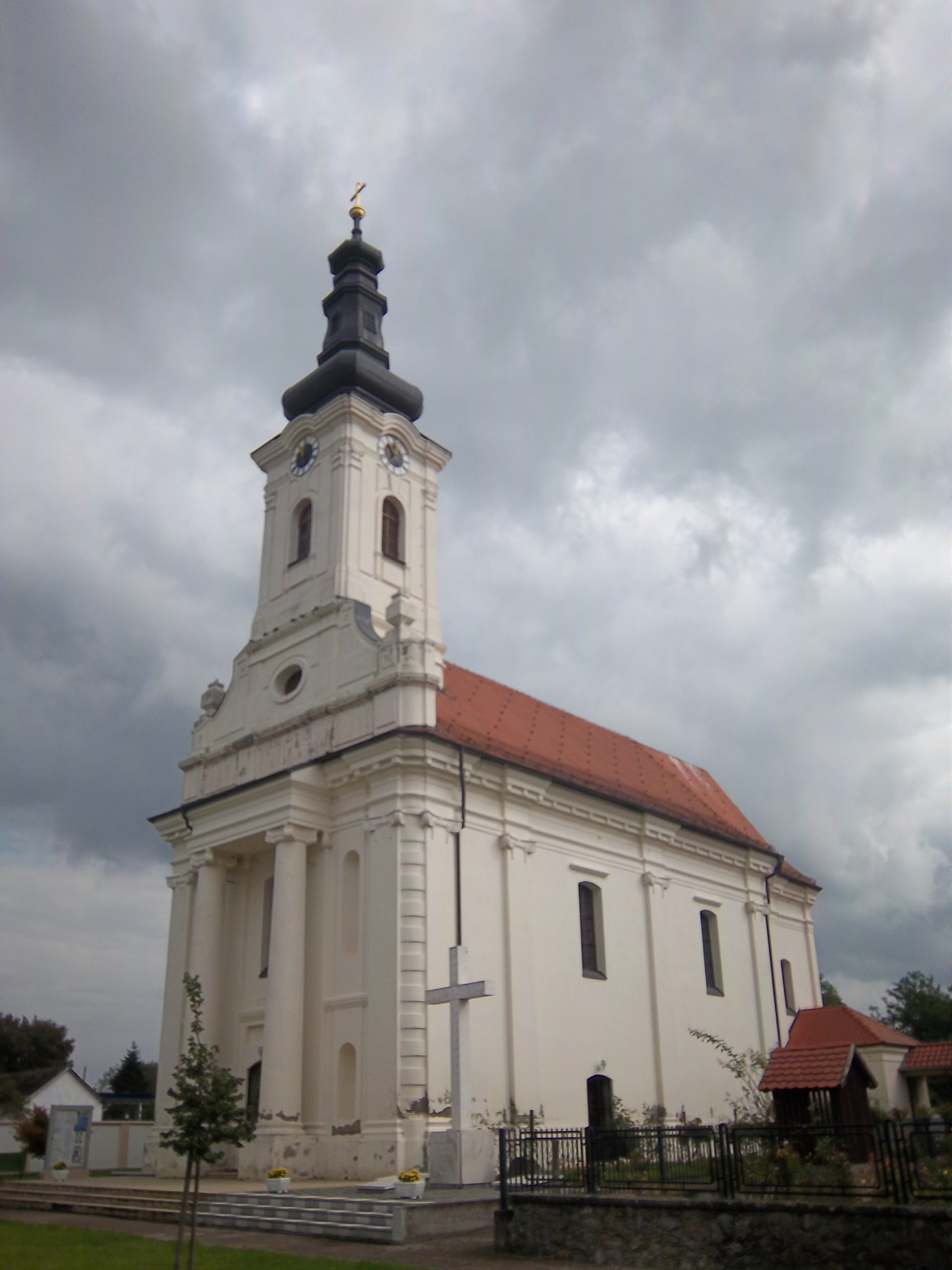
Roman Catholic church of Saint Matthew, Tovarnik

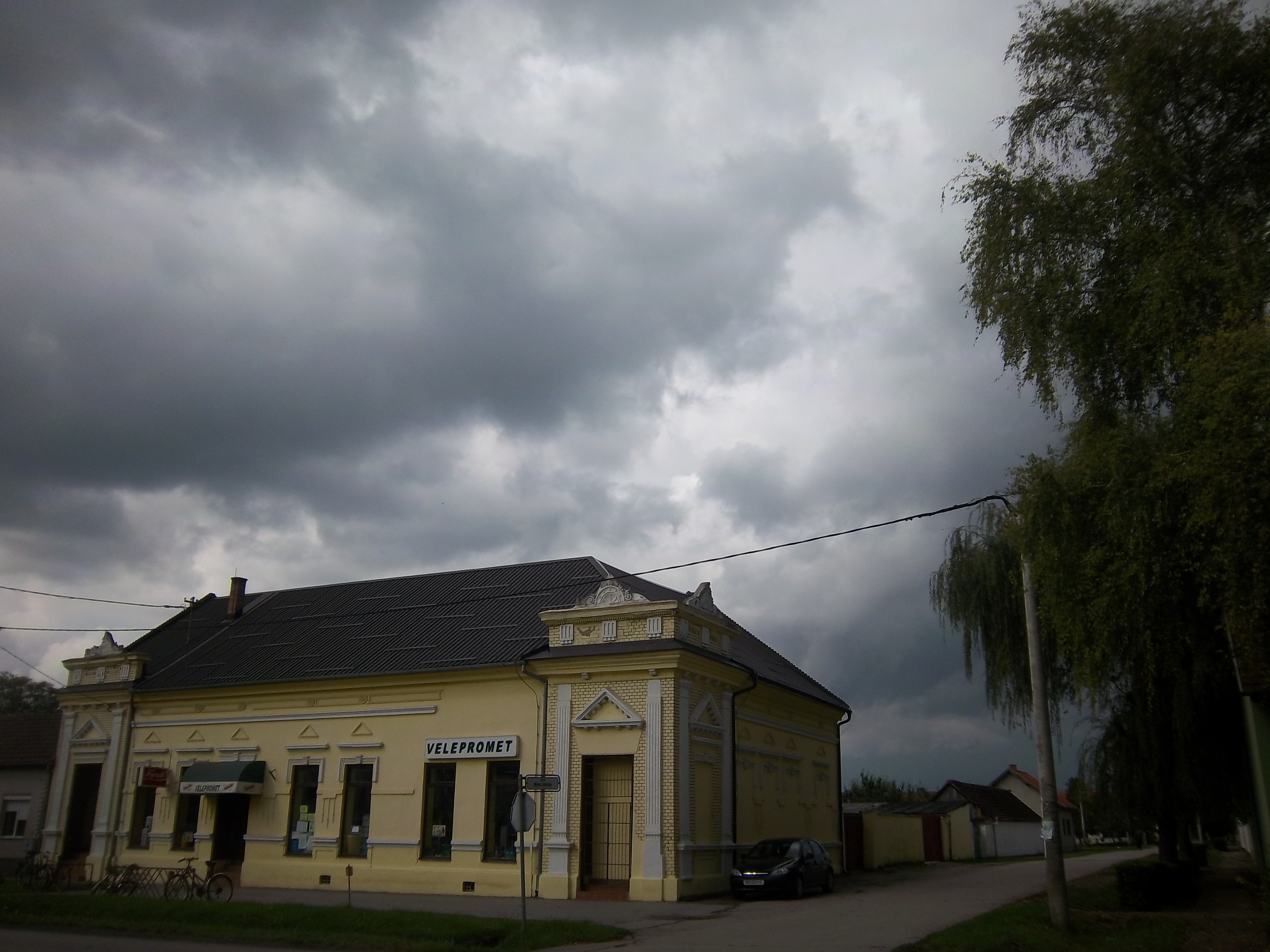
Velepromet store

== Notable natives and residents ==
- Antun Gustav Matoš
- Vojislav Stanimirović

== Settlements ==
The settlements of Ilača and Tovarnik comprise the Tovarnik municipality.

== See also ==
- European migrant crisis
- Ilača apparitions
- Tovarnik railway station
