= Antun Gustav Matoš =

Croatian writer (1873–1914)

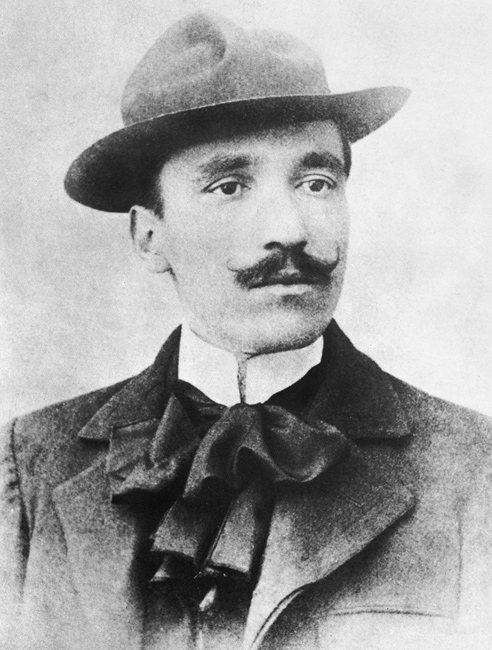
- Born: 13 June 1873; Tovarnik, Croatia-Slavonia, Austria-Hungary
- Died: 17 March 1914 (aged 40); Zagreb, Croatia-Slavonia, Austria-Hungary
- Occupations: Poet, journalist
- Writing career
- Period: Modernism
- Genres: Poetry, novella, feuilleton
- Subjects: Landscapes, patriotism

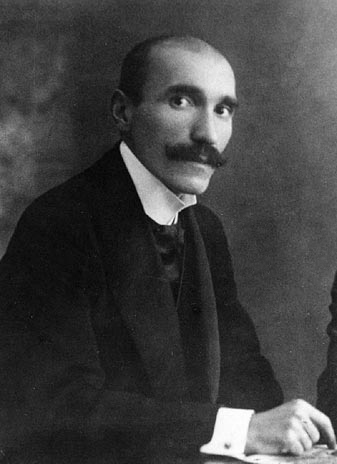
Antun Gustav Matoš in 1913

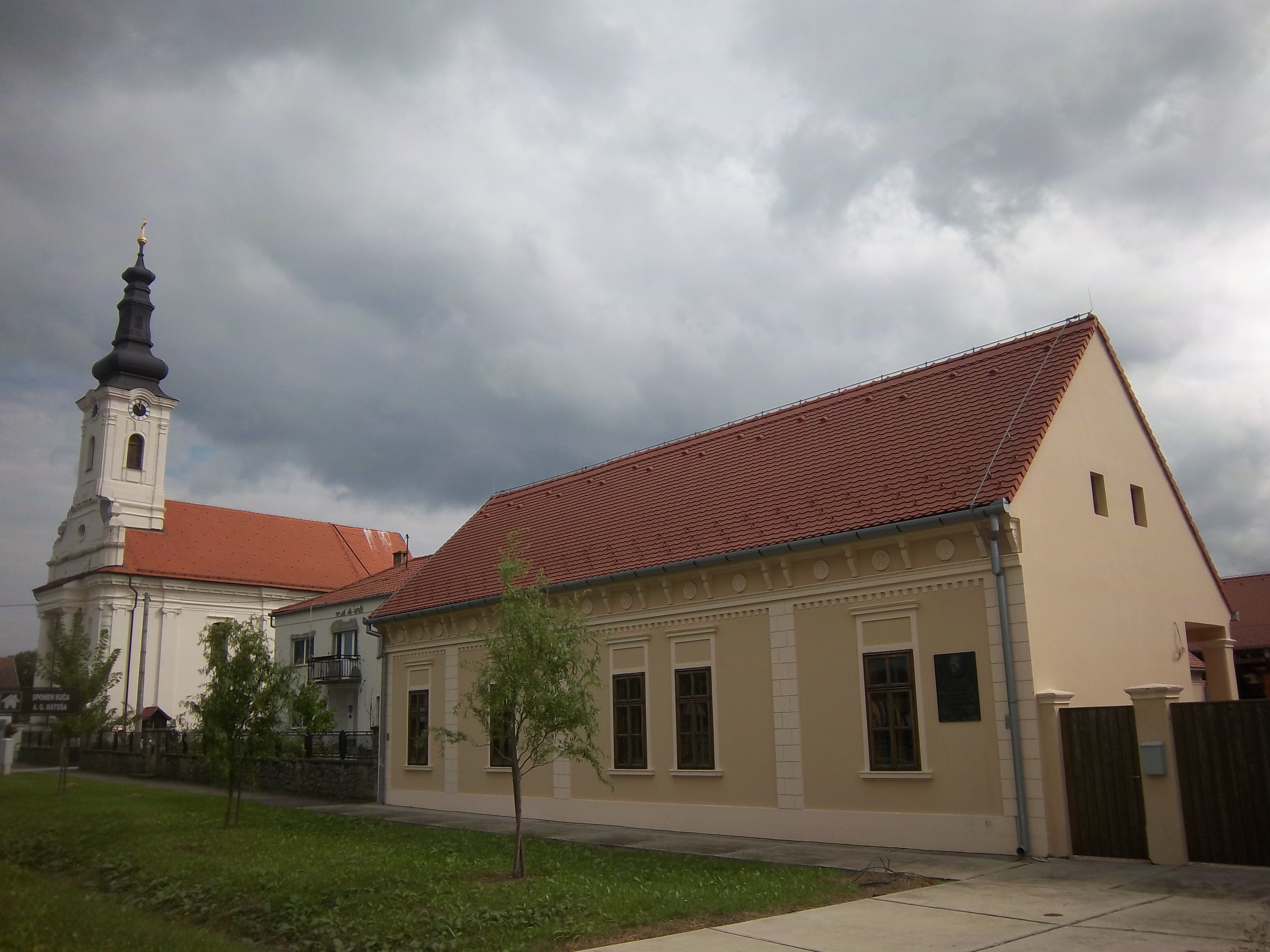
Antun Gustav Matoš home in Tovarnik

Antun Gustav Matoš (Croatian pronunciation: [ǎntuːn ɡûstaʋ mâtoʃ]; 13 June 1873 – 17 March 1914) was a Croatian poet, short story writer, journalist, essayist and travelogue writer. He is considered the champion of Croatian modernist literature, opening Croatia to the currents of European modernism.

== Life ==
Matoš was born in Tovarnik, in the eastern Croatian region of Syrmia on 13 June 1873. In September 1875, when he was two years old, his parents moved to Zagreb, where he went to primary and secondary school. His attempt to study at the Military Veterinary College in Vienna in 1891 ended in failure due to an illness. He was conscripted in 1893, but he deserted in August 1894, fleeing from Croatia to Šabac and then to Belgrade. He spent the next three years in Belgrade, living in his own words as a "cello player, journalist, and man of letters". In January 1898 he traveled to Vienna and Munich, and then stayed for a while in Geneva, before moving to Paris in 1899, where he would stay for five years. During his stay in Paris, he wrote his greatest stories. In 1904 he returned to Belgrade, visiting Zagreb in secret (as he was still wanted as a deserter) twice that year and again in 1906 and 1907. Finally, in 1908, after thirteen years abroad, he was pardoned and finally settled in Zagreb. In December 1913, as his health was failing, he was admitted to the Sisters of Charity Hospital where he died in March 1914 of throat cancer. He wrote two dozen published or unpublished works: poems, short stories, articles, travelogues, criticisms and disputes.

== Writing ==
Matoš is the central figure of Croatian modernism (Croatian: modernizam), a radical change in Croatian literature under European influences, as it quickly absorbed contemporary tendencies and styles such as Symbolism, modernism or impressionism, relying on French literary heritage from Baudelaire to Mallarmé, Barres and Huysmans. Estheticism and artistic norms became the primary value criterion. National and social activism, which used to be virtually the only measuring stick, became only a part of a wider mission of Croatian writers. After Matoš, the writers were not expected to create art for propaganda purposes (except during communism).

He entered into Croatian literature in 1892 with a short story called "Moć savjesti" (The Power of Conscience). Its publication is considered the start of Croatian moderna. He wrote down his thoughts on literary creation and role models on several occasions. As for short story writers, I have the greatest affection for Poe's genius and the superior, concise precision of Merimée and the natural feel of Maupassant's satire, he told his friend Milan Ogrizović in a letter. He developed his affection for Poe via Charles Baudelaire's French translation of Poe's work.

=== Fiction ===
His short stories are usually divided into two groups, based primarily on his themes, but also his techniques, methods and styles:

- realistic stories taking place in local settings of Zagreb and Zagorje and with characters taken from real life,
- bizarre tales with weird, individualist characters.

Both groups share a strong lyrical note and love plots. They were created in parallel, at the same time, which indicates that it was no "evolution" of Matoš as a storyteller, but that he strove to use different subjects for his "studies in style", as he described them.

Many elements of his stories with Croatian themes, such as the social problems of his time, spilled into his cycle of grotesque fantasies. That cycle, however, mainly explores the themes of mysterious love, death and nocturnal states and phenomena. For that purpose, Matoš reduced the plot, deeply analyzed the individual destinies of his heroes, removed superficial and anecdotal elements, and introduced implausible events and bizarre characters. Such tales push psychological motives to the forefront, while the social element becomes secondary. Because of all this, the grotesque tales abandoned the regional and national for the cosmopolitan.

In his travelogues, Matoš was one of the greatest Croatian innovators. Landscape, not as a part of a tale, but as an independent subject, was introduced by Matoš to the Croatian literature under the influence of Barres. His landscapes are not external images, but active settings in which the author moves. In fact, their purpose is not only to evoke feelings, but also to develop associations that lead to thoughts about wildly different issues. Such clearly impressionist strategy, which uses the landscape for emotional excitement that spills over to all kinds of topics, is a typical feature of almost all the prose works of Matoš. He wrote many exceptional travelogues where the landscape is the only subject, the most famous being Oko Lobora (Around Lobor).

=== Poetry ===
While he wrote and published short stories, travelogues, criticisms and articles throughout his entire career, It was only around 1906, in the later period of his career, that Matoš began seriously writing and publishing poetry, during which he wrote around 100 poems. There can be no doubt that his great mentor was Baudelaire, since he took many formal elements from the great poet and wrote enthusiastically about Baudelaire on several occasions.

The style of his poetry is marked by the predilection for the sonnet form, the gift for the musical qualities of verses, the harmony of words, colors and smells (synesthetic metaphor), a very refined rhythm, and the mix of talking and singing intonation.

His main poetic themes in the early phase are love and flower, as he merges the abstract quality of love with the concrete poetic symbol of flowers. Another recurrent theme is death, which suffuses his poems with an elegiac quality, an intense feeling of transience and passing, a merging of dreams and reality, with stifled colors and sounds, and the experience of love as pain. His best love poems are Samotna ljubav (Lonely Love), Djevojčici mjesto igračke (To a Child Instead of a Toy), Utjeha kose (Comfort of Hair).

He wrote some of the best landscape poetry in Croatian literature, reflecting his emotional states in poetic landscapes of Jesenje veče (Autumn Evening) or Notturno. On the other hand, he also used poems to express his patriotic feelings. In his best patriotic poems – Stara pjesma (Old Song), 1909 and Iseljenik (Immigrant) – the poet, who returned to his homeland in 1908, shows his disappointment with the Croats under Hungarian oppression.

=== Literary criticism ===
Matoš left a deep impression on the literary genres of criticism, essay and newspaper article. While using a strong impressionist approach to the works of Croatian (Kranjčević, Vidrić, Domjanić, Kamov) and Serbian writers (Sremac, Veselinović, Pandurović), Matoš often stated his own artistic beliefs in his articles. Since he believed art meant beauty, he considered the intensity of poet's expression or the individual writer's style as the main criterion for the valuation of literature. For this reason, he made no difference between genres: fiction, poetry and criticism are all just art, which should primarily reflect the individual character of the artist and their ability for original expression. Still, despite such general criteria, he never neglected the national element when analyzing Croatian writers.

== Works ==
Poems: collected poetry (posthumous)

Short stories

- Iverje (Fragments, 1899)
- Novo iverje (New Fragments, 1900)
- Umorne priče (Tired Tales,1909)

Essays

- Ogledi (Essays, 1905)
- Vidici i putovi (Horizons and Roads, 1907)
- Naši ljudi i krajevi (Our People and Lands, 1910)

== Sources ==
- Jonjić, Tomislav (September 2012). "Pogledi Antuna Gustava Matoša na hrvatsko-srpske odnose" [The views of Antun Gustav Matoš on Croat-Serb relations] (PDF). Pilar (in Croatian). VII (13). Zagreb: Institute of Social Sciences Ivo Pilar: 9–76.
