= Niko Gršković =

Croatian politician and journalist (1863 – 1949)

- Born: 15 November 1863; Vrbnik, Austrian Littoral, Austrian Empire (now Croatia)
- Died: 21 March 1949 (aged 85); New York
- Occupations: Politician, journalist, priest
- Political party: Party of Rights

Niko Gršković (Vrbnik, 15 September 1863 – New York, 21 March 1949) was a priest, journalist and Croatian and Yugoslavian politician. From 1887, he served as a chaplain in a series of towns including Ogulin, Kraljevica, Fužine, Bakar, Delnice, and Perušić. He joined the Party of Rights and took up journalism, editing the party newspaper Hrvat. He left the country following a conflict with church and civil authorities and moved to Chicago. In the United States, Gršković established Croatian Roman Catholic parishes in Chicago and Cleveland and initiated building of churches for the two parishes. He left the priesthood in 1918 to concentrate on political activism and journalistic work. Gršković bought the Croatian diaspora-oriented Chicago-Sloboda journal originally published by Nikola Polić and published it in Chicago until 1902 and in Cleveland until 1904 as the Hrvatska sloboda (lit. Croatian Liberty). Gršković started publication of Hrvatski svijet (lit. Croatian World) daily in New York (renamed the Jugoslavenski svijet (lit. Yugoslav World) in 1917 and Svijet in 1921) and served as the newspaper's editor until retirement in 1938. Gršković advocated political unification of the South Slavs on Yugoslavist principles and dismantling of Austria-Hungary. Together with Mihajlo Pupin, Gršković organised (and presided over) the First and the Second Yugoslav Congresses in Chicago and Pittsburgh in 1915 and 1916 respectively. As an advocate of republicanism and as a proponent of unification of the South Slavs in a federal state, Gršković was suspicious of the intentions of the government of the Kingdom of Serbia following publication of the Corfu Declaration. After establishment of the Kingdom of Serbs, Croats and Slovenes in late 1918, Gršković was disappointed in the unification as he saw it as a fulfillment of the Greater Serbian agenda.
