= Ilača =

- Village (Selo)
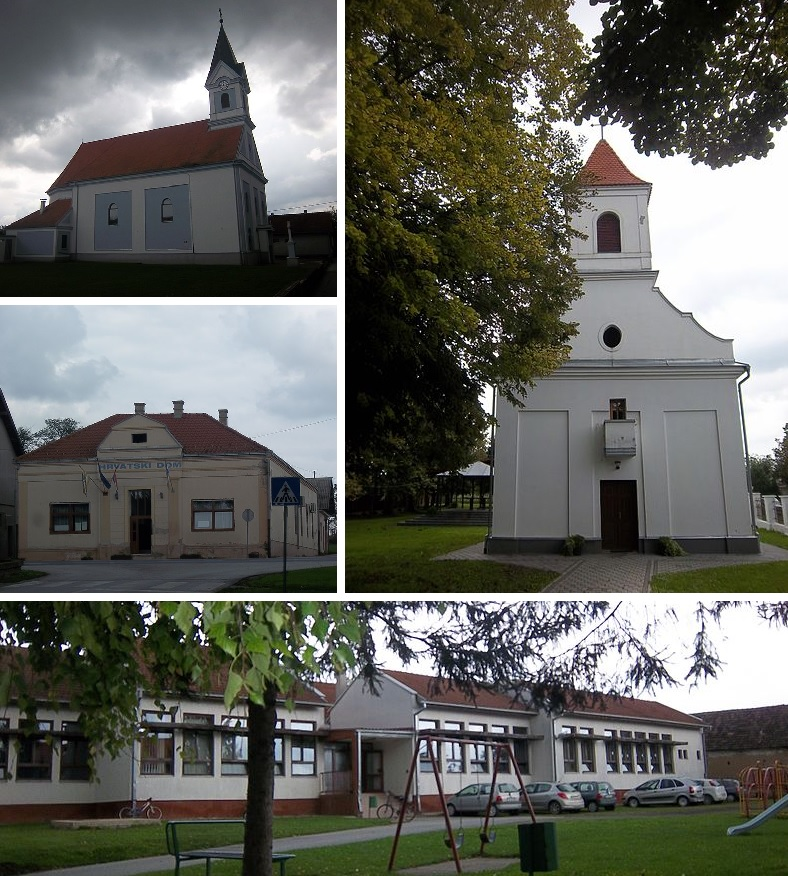

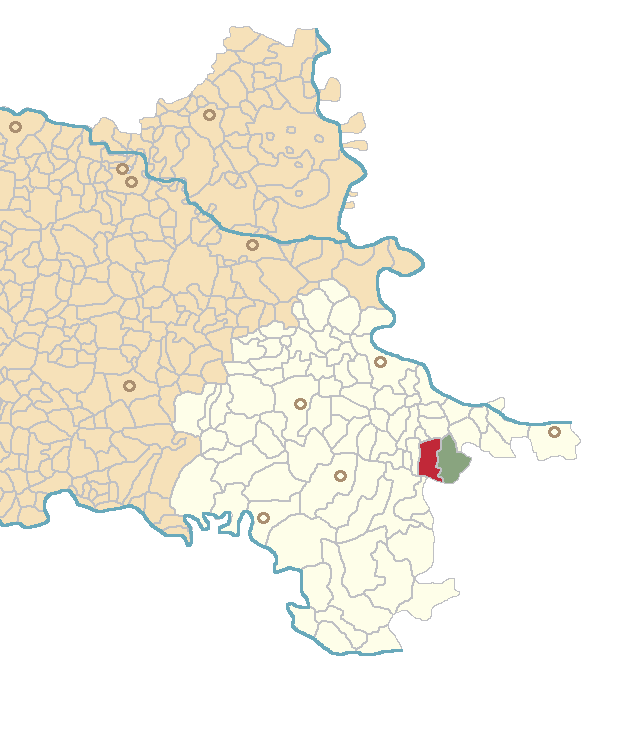

- Location within Vukovar-Syrmia County Location within Croatia Location within Europe
- Coordinates: 45°11′N 19°06′E
- Country: Croatia
- Region: Syrmia (Podunavlje)
- County: Vukovar-Syrmia
- Municipality: Tovarnik

Area
  - Total: 26.6 km^{2} (10.3 sq mi)
- Elevation: 91 m (299 ft)

Population (2021)
  - Total: 682
  - Density: 25.6/km^{2} (66.4/sq mi)
- Demonym(s): Ilačan (♂) Ilačanka (♀) (per grammatical gender)
- Time zone: UTC+1 (CET)
  - Summer (DST): UTC+2 (CEST)

Ilača (Hungarian: Illyefő) is a village in eastern Croatia, 30 kilometres (19 mi) southeast of Vinkovci. The village is connected with the rest of the country by the D46 state road connecting it with the town of Vinkovci and continuing into Serbia as the State Road 120 to the nearest town of Šid.

== History ==
The village of Ilača developed from an earlier Sveti Ilija (Saint Eliah) settlement which was mentioned for the first time in 1404. Old village was located about two kilometres north of the contemporary settlement at an low uphill of Vukovar Plateau but following the 1699 Treaty of Karlowitz and the Ottoman retreat villagers moved into the somewhat lower Bosut fields (Spačva basin). Following Ottoman retreat from the region, the Lordship of Vukovar was established, and the village became part of its domain. In 1736 local census 56 Catholic households were recorded, some of them earlier local inhabitants with others moving in from Bačka, Gorjani, Komletinci, Apševci, Kukujevci and Batrovci.

== Education ==
The village hosts a branch of Ilača–Banovci Elementary School (Croatian: Osnovna škola Ilača-Banovci). Since 2002, the school administration has been based at the location in Ilača. The local school in Ilača has the most students. Classes in Ilača are conducted in Croatian and in Latin script. The editorial office of the school newspaper Jeka (Echo) is also located in Ilača .

Other local schools that are part of the same administration are located in Banovci and Vinkovački Banovci.

== Religion ==
=== Ilača apparitions ===
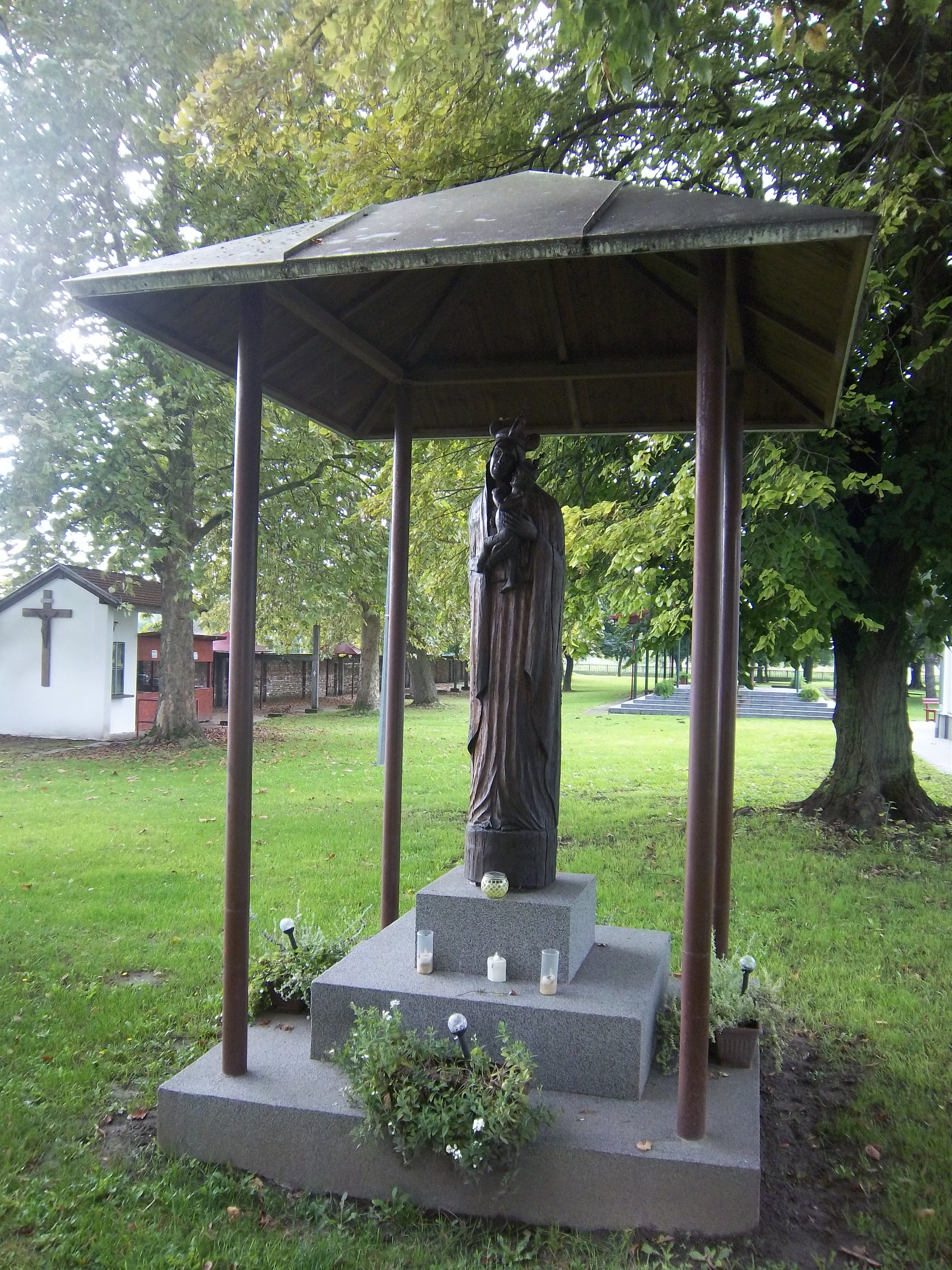
Virgin Mary statue

Ilača is the most important Catholic pilgrimage site in the historical region of Syrmia. The Marian Ilača apparitions were reported in 1865, seven years after the famous Lourdes apparitions. Shepard from Ilača Petar Lazin claimed that he saw a water on the middle of the field road although there was no rain, and that once he made a whole the water source started there that haven't stop since that time. At the same night, another villager, young Đuka Ambrušević saw a Virgin Mary with a child in his dream and she told him that it is her water spring, that he need to build a small wall around it so that stock don't drink from it. When he woke up he saw the image from his dream next to his bed. Initially church authorities tried to prevent congregation from pilgrimage. Later it was permitted by progressive bishop Josip Juraj Strossmayer. In 1866 small chapel was built next to the spring, and in 1870 construction of a church started. Ilača became target of pilgrimage for Roman Catholic Croats, Germans, Hungarians as well as for Eastern-rite Catholic Pannonian Rusyns. During the Croatian War of Independence church was destroyed by tanks of Yugoslav People's Army active in the area of self-proclaimed Serbian Autonomous Oblast of SAO Eastern Slavonia, Baranja and Western Syrmia. Once the UNTAES finished its peace mission in the Eastern Slavonia, Baranja and Western Syrmia in 1998 pilgrimage started once again to take place.

== Gallery ==
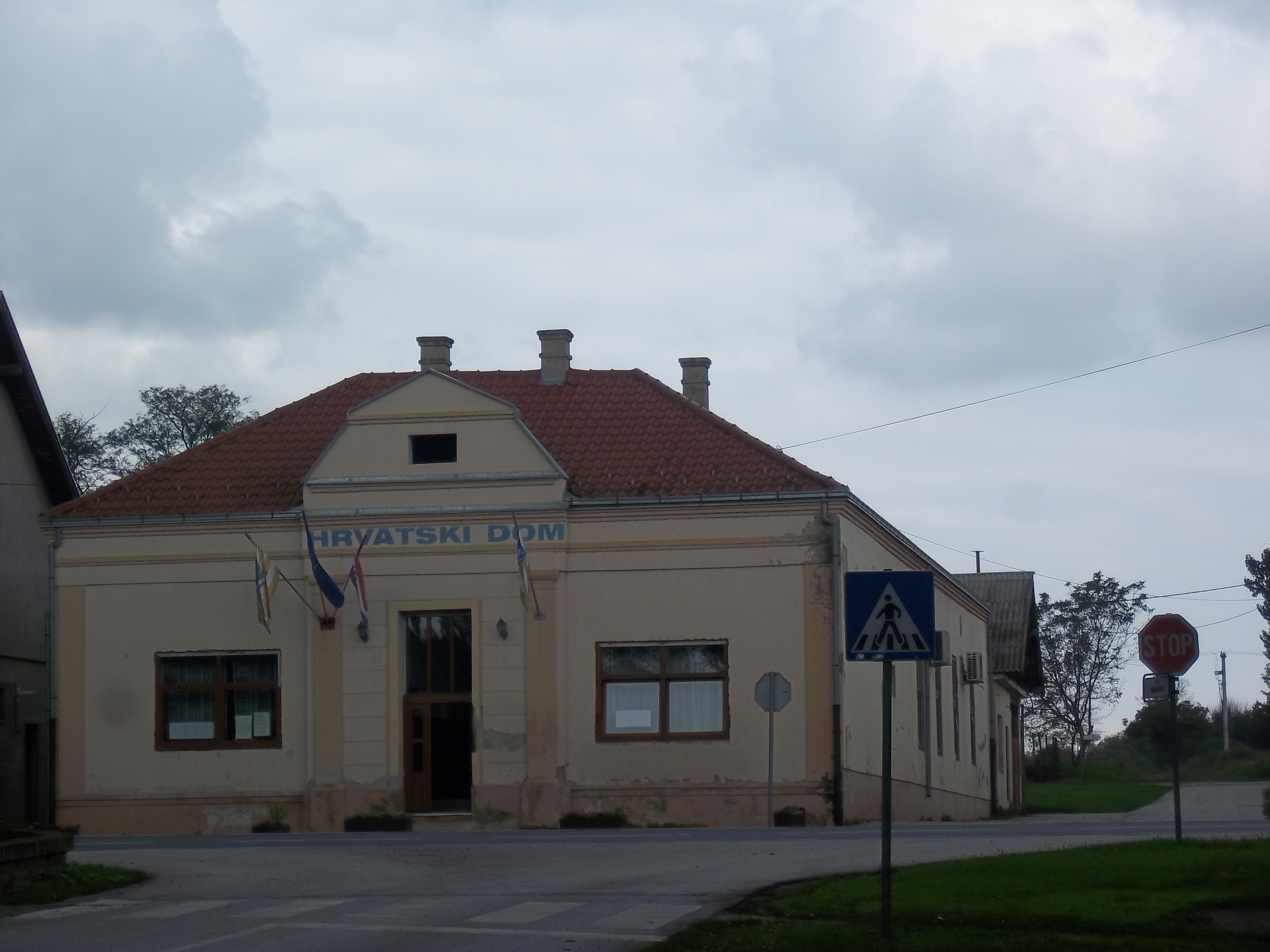

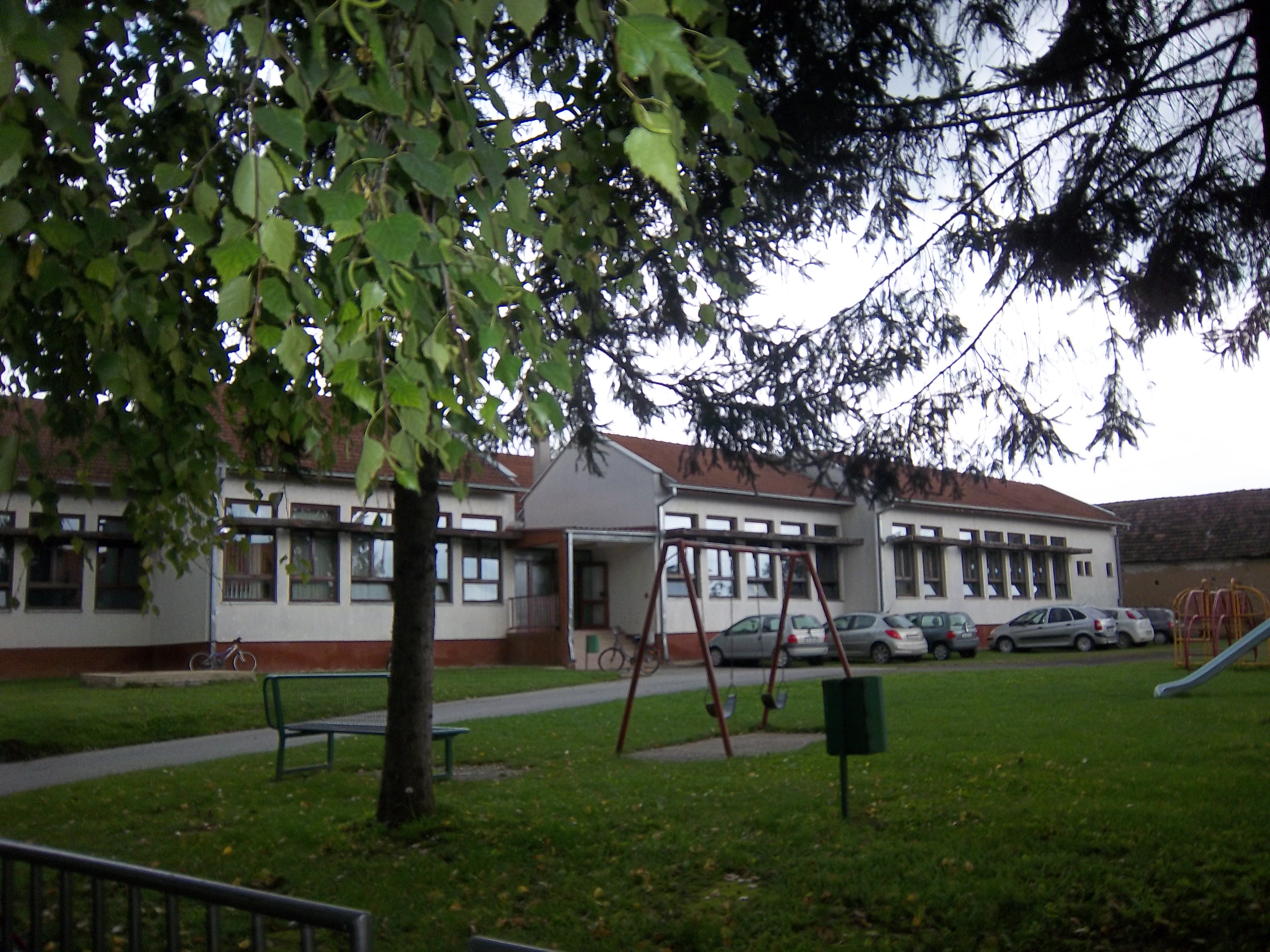

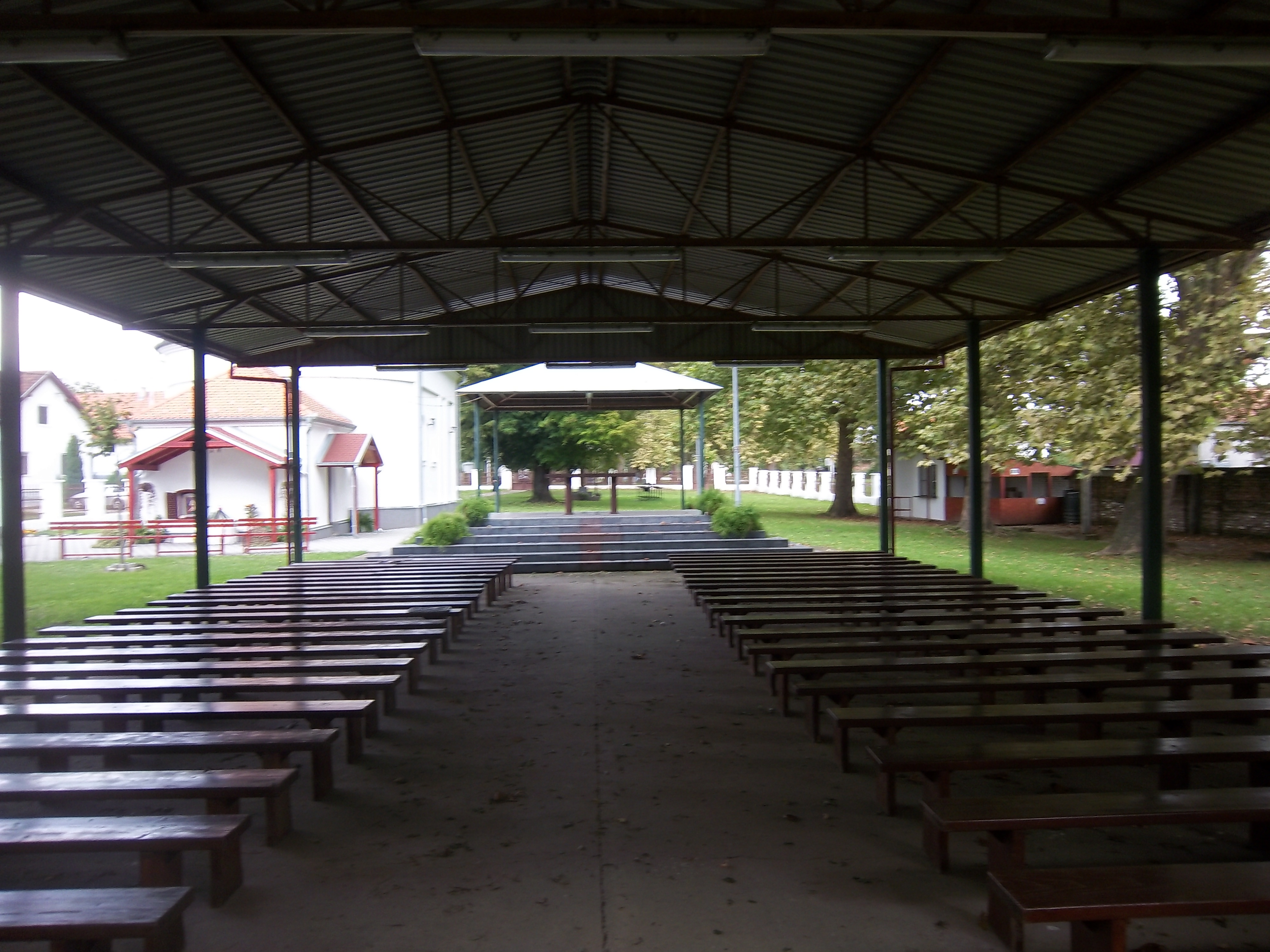

== See also ==
- Ilača railway station
