= Nikola Polić (journalist) =

Croatian journalist (1842 – 1902)

- Born: 1842; Praputnjak, Croatia, Austrian Empire (now Croatia)
- Died: 7 June 1902; Chicago
- Occupation: Journalist
- Political party: Party of Rights

Nikola Polić (Praputnjak near Bakar, 1842 – Chicago, 7 June 1902) was a journalist and an active member of the Party of Rights.

== Career ==
He moved to Chicago, United States where he published the Chicago weekly from 1892. It was one of the first publications of the Croatian diaspora. Polić used the Chicago to advocate better integration of Croats in the American Society. In 1893, Polić started publication of the journal Sloboda (lit. Liberty). In 1896 the two journals were merged and continued to be issued as Chicago-Sloboda. Polić sold the Chicago-Sloboda to Niko Gršković.
