= Praputnjak =

Settlement in Primorje-Gorski Kotar County, Croatia

- Settlement
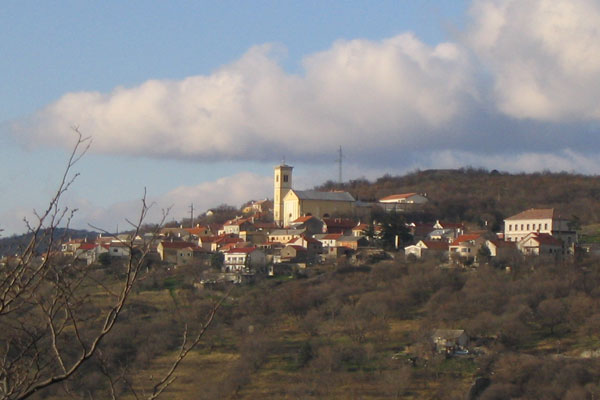
- Interactive map of Praputnjak
- Location of Praputnjak in Croatia
- Coordinates: 45°17′56″N 14°34′26″E
- Country: Croatia
- County: Primorje-Gorski Kotar
- City: Bakar

Area
  - Total: 14.2 km^{2} (5.5 sq mi)

Population (2021)
  - Total: 532
  - Density: 37.5/km^{2} (97.0/sq mi)
- Time zone: UTC+1 (CET)
  - Summer (DST): UTC+2 (CEST)
- Postal code: 51226 Hreljin
- Area code: +385 (0)51

Praputnjak is a settlement in the City of Bakar in Croatia. In 2021, its population was 532.

== Demographics ==
Praputnjak: Population trends 1857–2021
v

population	1234	1057	1121	1108	1014	811	836	763	588	541	634	682	620	581	575	593	532
	1857	1869	1880	1890	1900	1910	1921	1931	1948	1953	1961	1971	1981	1991	2001	2011	2021

Sources: Croatian Bureau of Statistics publications

== Governance ==
=== Local ===
It is the seat of its own local committee.
