= Nikola Polić (poet) =

Croatian poet (1890–1960)

- Born: 26 November 1890; Sušak, Croatia-Slavonia, Austria-Hungary (now Croatia)
- Died: 15 October 1960 (aged 69); Rijeka, Yugoslavia (now Croatia)
- Occupation: Poet
- Relatives: Janko Polić Kamov (brother)

Nikola Polić (26 November 1890 – 15 October 1960) was a Croatian poet. Polić's family (including his more widely-known brother Janko Polić Kamov) moved to Zagreb where he attended high school and then alternated living in Zagreb and Sušak where he worked as the City Library principal. He wrote under the influence of Antun Gustav Matoš and his first poems were published in the 1914 collection Hrvatska mlada lirika ("Croatian Young Poetry") edited by Ljubo Wiesner. He published Jučerašnji grad ("Yesterday's City") as his first collection of poetry in 1936, followed by Pjesme ("Poems") and Nad ukočenim gradom ("Above the Inflexible City") in 1951 and 1961, respectively. His novella Fortunatov utorak ("Fortune's Tuesday") was published in 1930, and a collection of feuilletons Marginalia in 1921.
