= Church of St. George, Tovarnik =

Serbian Orthodox church in Tovarnik, Croatia

Church of St. George
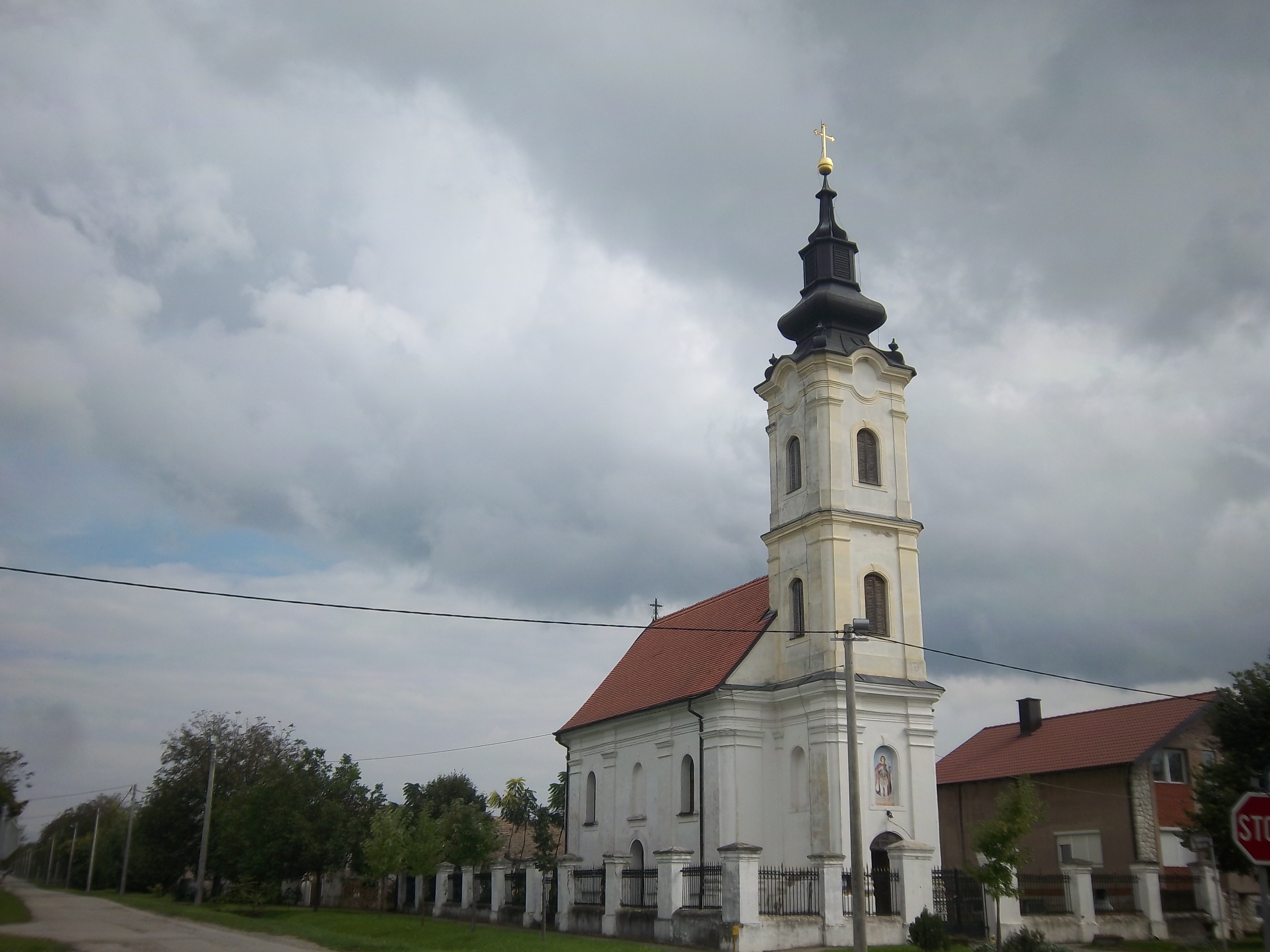
- Church of St. George
- Church of St. George
- 45°10′0″N 19°9′0″E
- Location: Tovarnik
- Country: Croatia
- Denomination: Serbian Orthodox

History
- Dedication: St. George

Architecture
- Style: Baroque and Classicism
- Completed: 1799

Administration
- Archdiocese: Eparchy of Srem

The Church of St. George (Croatian: Crkva svetog Georgija, Serbian Cyrillic: Црква Светог Ђорђа) in Tovarnik is a Serbian Orthodox church in eastern Croatia built in 1799. Together with the Orthodox church in Ilok and Church of the Holy Venerable Mother Parascheva, it is under the spiritual jurisdiction of the Eparchy of Srem with the seat in Sremski Karlovci, contrary to most of the other Serbian Orthodox churches in eastern Croatia that are under the Eparchy of Osječko polje and Baranja.

== History ==
The Church of St. George was built in 1799. At the end of World War II, after the fall of Nazi and Ustaša forces on the Syrmian Front, a group of 51 local ethnic Danube Swabians and Croats were killed on the church ground by Yugoslav Partisans. In 2012, unknown perpetrators broke the church's windows by hitting stones at them during the night.

== See also ==
- List of Serbian Orthodox churches in Croatia
