= Ilača apparitions =

Lady of Ilača Gospa ilačka
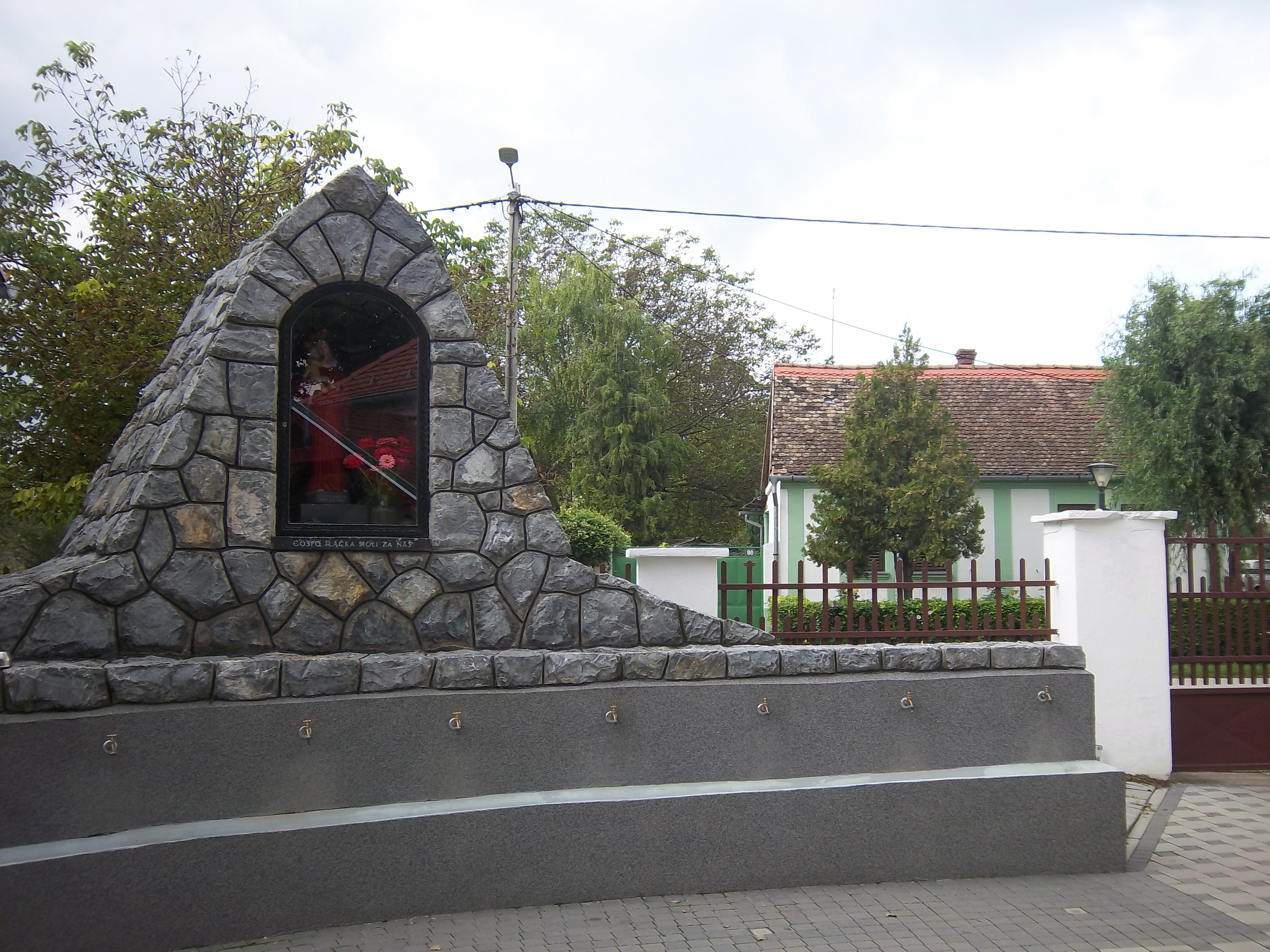
- Location: Ilača, Croatia
- Type: Marian apparition
- Approval: 1865

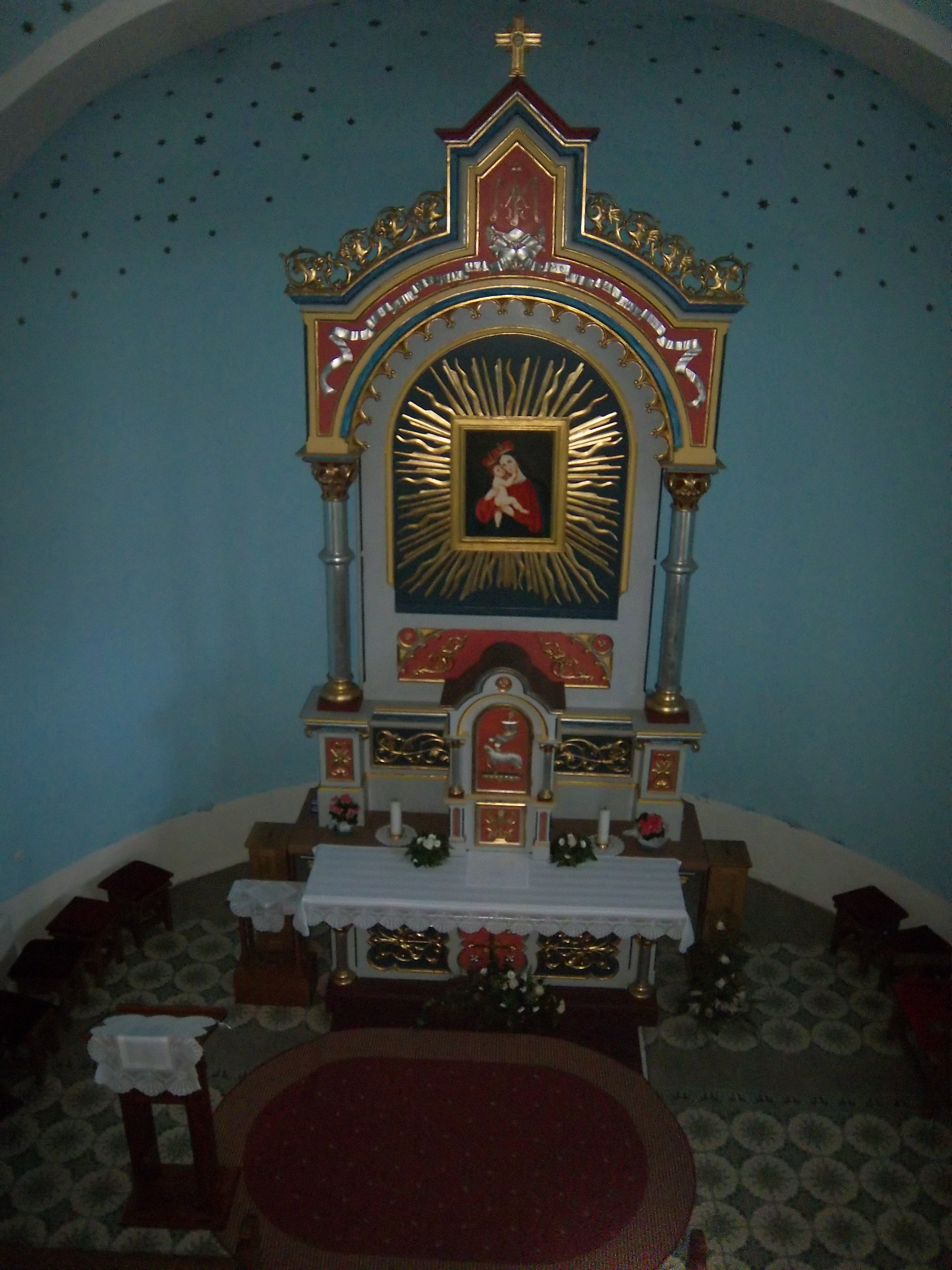
Lady of Ilača

The Marian Apparitions of Ilača were reported sightings of miraculous events in Croatia in 1865. This was seven years after the Lourdes apparitions. Ilača became the most important Catholic pilgrimage site in the historical region of Syrmia. Initially, church authorities tried to prevent congregations from pilgrimage. Later, it was permitted by bishop Josip Juraj Strossmayer.

In 1865, a shepherd from Ilača, Petar Lazin, claimed seeing water on the middle of the field road although no rain had fallen, and that once he made a hole, water started flowing and continued thereafter. On the same night, another villager, Đuka Ambrušević saw the Virgin Mary with a child. In his dream, she told him that it was her spring, and that he must build a wall around it so that livestock could not drink from it. When he woke up, he saw the image from his dream next to his bed.

In 1866, a small chapel was built next to the spring, and in 1870 construction of a church began. Ilača became the target of pilgrimage for Roman Catholic Croats, Germans, Hungarians as well as for Eastern-rite Catholic Pannonian Rusyns.

During the Croatian War of Independence in the 1990s, the church was destroyed by tanks of the Yugoslav People's Army active in the area of self-proclaimed Serbian Autonomous Oblast of Eastern Slavonia, Baranja and Western Syrmia. Once the UNTAES finished its peace mission in Eastern Slavonia, Baranja and Western Syrmia in 1998, pilgrimage resumed.

A documentary about Ilača pilgrimage was recorded in 2010. It was presented at the UK Christian Film Festival and Lecce International Tourfilm Festival.

== See also ==
- Marian apparition
- Aljmaš, Croatia
