= Janko Polić Kamov =

Croatian writer and poet (1886–1910)

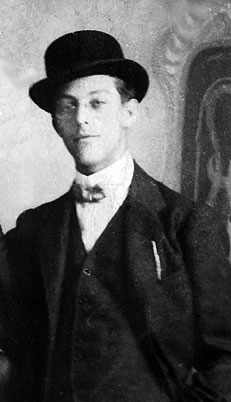
- Polić in 1909
- Born: Janko Mate Vinko Polić; 17 November 1886; Sankt Veit am Flaum, Austria-Hungary (now Rijeka, Croatia)
- Died: 8 August 1910 (aged 23); Barcelona, Spain
- Occupations: Poet, playwright, short story writer, novelist
- Relatives: Nikola Polić (brother) Vladimir Polić (brother)
- Writing career
- Language: Croatian
- Period: 1905–1914
- Movement: Modernism

Janko Polić Kamov (pronounced [jâːŋko pǒːlit͡ɕ kâmoʋ]; 17 November 1886 – 8 August 1910) was a Croatian novelist, playwright, writer, and poet. Although his oeuvre is small due to his short life, he is considered a significant writer in Croatian literature. Emblematic of the contemporary anger and displeasure over the hypocrisy and injustice of his time. His magnum opus is considered to be his modernist novel Isušena kaljuža ('A Dried Mire', 1906–1909), which contains the psychosexual and spiritual conflicts of the iconoclastic narrator, later described as a proto-existentialist. The novel, described as the premier Croatian avant-garde major work of prose, was printed for the first time in 1956, nearly forty-six years after Polić Kamov's death. Because of that, he earned a reputation as one of the greatest rebels and iconoclasts in the history of Croatian culture.

== Biography ==
He was born in Sušak, Rijeka on 17 November 1886, the thirteenth of fourteen children born to Ante Polić and Gemma (née Grbac (Note: Also recorded as Gerbaz, in accordance with German orthographic conventions.)). Polić's father, Ante, was from a prominent and wealthy family from Hvar who relocated to Senj for his trade education and then to Rijeka, where he gained considerable wealth and reputation from his trade. His mother Gemma also came from a prominent insular Croatian family from Cres. Polić's brother Nikola also became a published poet. Polić was familiar with literature early in his life, where his father's expansive library provided him with ample exposure to Croatian literature and his father's connections as a public employee and staunch supporter of the nationalist Party of Rights made his father friends with many notable Croats of the period, such as Erazmo Barčić, Marijan Derenčin, Ante Starčević, and Frano Supilo. Ante was also a correspondent of Josip Juraj Strossmayer and Silvije Strahimir Kranjčević. With Dinko Politeo in 1903, Ante published and managed a newspaper in support of the Pure Party of Rights, with Politeo serving as editor-in-chief.

In 1902, the family's wealth collapsed after two of the daughters died of tuberculosis and the family relocated to Zagreb. In February 1905, Ante died of metastatic carcinoma and exactly one year later Gemma died of a heart attack. Their deaths had a lasting impact on Polić's mental health and outlook on life.

Polić was expelled from several different schools during his secondary schooling. He was expelled over a verbal conflict with a teacher in Sušac and expelled from both institutions he attended in Senj, a gymnasium and a Catholic boarding school.

Because of his participation in – and an altercation with the police at – the demonstration against the Hungarian then-ban Khuen-Héderváry, he was sentenced to three months in prison in 1903.

After his release, he left Zagreb to travel with an acting troupe across Dalmatia, Bosnia and Herzegovina, and Montenegro. While in Montenegro, the troupe performed for Nikola I of Montenegro, with Polić working as a prompter in a production of Henrik Ibsen's Ghosts.

From 1907 until 1910, Polić traveled throughout Italy until he left for Spain, joining avant-garde circles there. He died at the age of 23 in Barcelona at the Hospital de la Santa Creu and was buried at the Cementeri de Montjuïc, in the common grave for corpses no one claimed.

While it is unclear when, Polić chose the pseudonym Kamov after Ham (or Kam) from the Old Testament, who saw his father Noah naked, but, unlike his siblings Shem and Japheth, did not cover his nakedness, thus issuing a curse.

== Legacy ==
Kamov is treated as a very special writer within Croatian literature. His writings have been variously labeled as proto-modernist, avant-garde, absurdist, existentialist, futurist, and surrealist, and is considered to be a highly original author for the period. His work paved way and influenced later Croatian authors such as Miroslav Krleža and Antun Branko Šimić. A number of his works have been translated into English during the 1990s such as Sloboda ('Freedom') or Žalost ('Sorrow'), which led the American literary theorist Geoffrey Hartman to describe him as the biggest literary discovery during that period.

== Works ==
=== Poetry ===
- Psovka (Curse), (Zagreb, 1907)
- Ištipana hartija, (Zagreb, 1907)

=== Short stories ===
- Ćaskanja, Izdanje knjižare G. Trbojevića, Rijeka, 1914.
  - Ecce Homo
  - Brada
  - Sloboda
  - Žalost
  - Katastrofa
  - Bitanga
  - Žena
  - Odijelo
  - Stjenica

=== Plays ===
- Iznakaženi (written, 17 and 18 December 1904)
- Tragedija mozgova: tri scene (Zagreb, 1907)
- Na rođenoj grudi: dramatizovana studija (Zagreb, 1907)
- Samostanske drame, 1908.
  - Orgije monaha
  - Djevica
- Čovječanstvo, 1908.
- Mamino srce, 1910.

=== Novels ===
- Isušena kaljuža ("A Dried Mire"; 1906–1909)
