= Palić (surname) =

Palić is a South Slavic surname. Notable people include:

- Antun Palić (born 1988), Croatian footballer
- Avdo Palić (1958–1995), Bosnian military officer
- Kerim Palić (born 1997), Bosnian footballer
- Petar Palić (born 1972), Croatian bishop
- Tea Palić (born 1991), Croatian alpine skier
- Vinko Palić, (1965-1993) Croatian mass-shooter
