= Catholicism and socialism =

The relationship between Catholicism and socialism has been debated by various experts and theologians over the years. While some argue for the incompatibility of the two, movements like liberation theology argue for the compatibility of them, and forms like Latin American Liberation Theology have synthesized Christian theology with Marxian socio-economic analysis. Others have also argued that the Church's historical opposition to socialism was mainly concerned with atheistic or state socialism, and not with more decentralized systems such as worker cooperatives.

== Official Church stance ==
The Catechism of the Catholic Church condemns "atheistic and totalitarian" ideologies associated with socialism and communism.

Communism and socialism have been condemned by Pope Pius IX, Pope Leo XIII, Pope Pius X, Pope Benedict XV, Pope Pius XI, Pope Pius XII, Pope John XXIII, Pope Paul VI, and Pope John Paul II. Many of these popes, Leo XIII and Pius XI in particular, have also condemned unregulated capitalism. Pope Benedict XVI, while reaffirming the Church's opposition to Marxism and communism, praised democratic socialism, distinguishing it from totalitarian socialism.

=== Camilo Torres Restrepo ===
Camilo Torres Restrepo, a Catholic priest ordained in 1954, was a known advocate of socialism, and eventually joined the National Liberation Army. Torres' political programme was read by Catholic bishop Joseph Blomjous and was found to contain no contradictions to papal encyclicals. During his studies in Belgium, Torres became fascinated with Marxism and visited the Soviet Union in 1955, where he became supportive of Joseph Stalin. Torres’ friend who became a communist, Jaime Díaz, praised him for going to Moscow and "praying at the miraculous tomb of our father Stalin".

=== Pope John Paul II ===
In 1981, John Paul II released the papal encyclical Laborem exercens. The encyclical was hailed by the followers of liberation theology and socialist circles, as in it John Paul II acknowledged the existence of a great conflict of interest between capital and labor, and the class struggle employed as a means of resolving social injustice. He also advocated proposals for joint ownership and sharing by workers in management and profit. In Centesimus annus from 1991, John Paul II went further and spoke of "positive role of class conflict when it takes the shape of a struggle for social justice." Additionally, in Laborem exercens he argued that the Church had always taught the priority of labor over capital, and denounced capitalism as a system which treats man as "an instrument of production". The pope also stated in it that "the right to private property is subordinated to the right to common use", and in regards to the means of production, "whether in the form of public or collective ownership is that they should serve labor and make possible the right to common use." Gregory Baum noted that the encyclical appropriated Marxist terminology, such as "labor," "social leader," "alienation," "transformation of nature," "proletarianization," "social subject," and "opposition between capital and labor". Baum theorised that Laborem exercens was a way for John Paul II to offer his own conclusions based on Marxist social analysis:

While the encyclical remains in continuity with the Church's social teaching, it introduces new ideas, derived from a critical and creative dialogue with Marxism, which allow the author to reread the Catholic tradition in a new light. Yet in the discussion of these insights he opens them up, overcomes their rigidity, expands them towards new meaning, and thus produces a social philosophy which transcends Marxism from within.

Liberation theologians Leonardo and Clodovis Boff also commented on the encyclical, seeing it as affirmation of the Church's use of Marxist elements:

Christian communities and the bishops of Latin America do use "elements" borrowed from Marxism. (...) Pope John Paul II does much the same in many of his own messages, especially in his encyclical Laborem Exercens, where he uses, with perfect freedom and against the horizon of faith, categories he borrows from Marx: alienation, exploitation, means of production, dialectic, praxis, and so on.

In his travel to Managua, Nicaragua in 1983, John Paul II harshly condemned what he dubbed the "popular Church", referencing the ecclesial base communities supported by the Latin American Episcopal Conference, and the Nicaraguan clergy's tendencies to support the leftist Sandinistas, reminding the clergy of their duties of obedience to the Holy See. During that visit Ernesto Cardenal, a priest and minister in the Sandinista government, knelt to kiss his hand. John Paul II withdrew it, wagged his finger in Cardenal's face, and told him, "You must straighten out your position with the Church."

However, in March 1986, the Vatican published an Instruction on the subject in which, while warning against reducing "the salvific dimension of liberation to the socio-ethical dimension which is a consequence of it," it supported "the special option for the poor" favored by the liberation theologians, and described the Basic Christian Communities which they had promoted as "a source of great hope for the Church." A few weeks later, the pope himself seemed to endorse the movement when he wrote to Brazilian bishops that as long as it is in harmony with the teaching of the Church, "we are convinced, we and you, that the theology of liberation is not only timely but useful and necessary. It should constitute a new state— in close connection with the former ones—of theological reflection."

=== Pope Francis ===
Pope Francis stated that "it is the communists who think like Christians," and had praised liberation theology founder Gustavo Gutiérrez. In 2013, he stated that while Marxist ideology is wrong, many Marxists he had met were good people. Later in 2014, Pope Francis remarked that "the communists have stolen our flag," arguing that concern for the poor is fundamentally Christian and predates communism by "twenty centuries." He stated that while communists identify care for the poor with communism, such principles have been central to Christianity since the Gospel, saying that "it is the communists who think like Christians. He also encouraged cooperation between Marxists and Christians. In his encyclical Laudato si', he also praised the use of cooperatives for their "less polluting means of production" and "non-consumerist model of life, recreation, and community", as well as their role in the use of renewable energy.

== Catholic and socialist interactions ==
According to John Hellman, "Not long before he died, Lenin told a French Catholic visitor that 'only Communism and Catholicism offered two diverse, complete and inconfusible conceptions of human life'". This led Maurice Thorez of the French Communist Party to offer "an outstretched hand" to French Catholics in 1936, wishing "to achieve a tactical alliance to head off fascism in France and Europe and to promote social progress". A large number of French Catholics did enter a dialogue with the party, but to Thorez's surprise, "these Catholics were not, for the most part, the Catholic workers, clerks, artisans, peasants to whom Maurice Thorez had addressed his appeal, but rather Catholic philosophers, "social priests," journalists, and cardinals". While Catholics were wary of the socialist concept of the revolution, and strongly opposed to the atheism of most socialist movements, "strong criticism of capitalism and economic liberalism was a persistent theme in episcopal pronouncements and Catholic literature". The attempt of a Communist-Catholic unity in France is considered successful, as most French Catholics were opposed to fascism and when offered an alliance on grounds of anti-fascist unity, "saw the Communist offer as a religious and moral rather than political issue".

Similar alliances took place in Italy. According to a historian Elisa Carrillo, the Vatican was sceptical of "condemning any variety of communism", and Italian Catholics cooperated with Communists in the anti-fascist resistance. After WWII, members of the Italian Catholic Action "saw no essential incompatibility between Marxism and Catholicism" and established close ties with Communists such as Mario Alicata and Pietro Ingrao. Catholic Communists in Italy also had contacts with the clergy, such as with the priest Giuseppe De Luca. The church made "no attempt to suppress or condemn the efforts of these young people to reconcile Catholicism with Marxism", and in 1943, Cardinal Luigi Maglione intervened on behalf of 400 Communist Catholics who were arrested for anti-government demonstrations.

=== Catholic-Soviet interactions ===
During a private meeting, Stalin assured Catholic priest Stanislaus Orlemanski that the USSR was not hostile to the Catholic Church.

In 1949, Bolesław Bierut contributed 100,000 zlotys from his personal funds for the construction of a church.

== Notable Catholic socialists ==
- Hélder Câmara
- António Costa
- Dorothy Day
- Pier Giorgio Frassati
- Gustavo Gutiérrez
- Vito Marcantonio
- Eva Perón
- Alexandria Ocasio-Cortez
- Thomas Sankara
- Cesare Seassaro
- Guido Miglioli
- Camilo Torres Restrepo

== See also ==
- Christian communism
- Catholic communism
- Christian socialism
- Catholic Worker Movement
- Catholic social teaching
- Camilism
