= Catholic communism =

Combination of Catholicism and communism

Catholic communism Cattocomunismo
- Founder: Guido Miglioli; Cesare Seassaro
- Ideology: Communism; Bolshevism; Catholic social teaching; Historical materialism
- Political position: Far-left
- Religion: Catholicism
- Regional affiliation: Christian Movement for Peace
- International affiliation: ELN; Montoneros; FSLN

Catholic communism (known in Italian as cattocomunismo) is a political and theological movement that attempts to combine or synthesise Catholic social teachings with communism and Bolshevism. Its adherents are known as Catholic communists, and the ideology has also been referred to, sometimes erroneously, by various other names, including Catholic Bolshevism, Christian Bolshevism, Left-Catholicism, and White Bolshevism.

The movement first emerged in Italy during the early 20th century, developing significantly in the 1930s among members of the Catholic Action association. Ideologically, Catholic communists view communism as the most effective means of realising Catholic social teaching. They generally accept historical materialism, but usually reject the dialectical materialism and state atheism of Marxism–Leninism.

== Core tenets ==
Catholic communism is founded on the belief that the principles of social justice, charity, and communal living espoused in Catholic social teaching can only be fully realised through a communist social and economic structure. The Gospel has been described within the movement as a "sublime Labour Charter". This synthesis distinguishes itself from traditional Marxism by its rejection of anti-religious and materialist doctrines.

Proponents drew parallels between Christian and communist ideals. Guido Miglioli, a leader of the "White Bolshevik" trade unions, argued that the message of the Russian Bolsheviks was ultimately Christian, asserting that peasants who fueled the revolution were "extraordinarily religious". He saw the 1918 Soviet Constitution as an "evangelical document" and framed its policies in biblical language, comparing the redistribution of land to the provision of manna from heaven, where no accumulation was permitted and all received according to their needs.

When asked why he remained a Catholic rather than simply becoming a communist, Miglioli stated that "Christianity brought communism beyond the limits of earthly life." This sentiment was echoed by others who saw the two ideologies as compatible. The writer Arthur Koestler, before his disillusionment with communism, observed that Catholicism and communism offered viable "theoretical blueprints of the future" and that Catholicism could complement communism by combining "the spiritual realm with the promise of social revolution".

== History ==
=== Origins in the European labour movement ===
Dialogue between Catholics and communists began in Italy and other Catholic European nations toward the end of the 19th century. As socialist trade unions changed working conditions for labourers, many Catholic workers perceived an overlap between the socialist aim of alleviating poverty and the principles of their faith. However, the anti-clerical and anti-theist positions common in socialism were a significant barrier to associating with socialists. In response, Catholics formed their own political associations and trade unions, leading to a labour movement divided between "red" (socialist) and "white" (Catholic) organisations.

After World War I, a left-wing tendency developed within the "white" Catholic unions in Italy. This movement, sometimes called "White Bolshevism", embraced the religious traditions of the Italian peasantry while also adopting the economic demands of socialism. These unions became a powerful regional force; in Verona, for example, land strikes organised by the left-wing Catholic movement involved over 150,000 workers. The movement's theoreticians, such as Cesare Seassaro, argued that anti-clericalism was a bourgeois ideology, and that many priests should be considered part of the working class.

These left-wing Catholic unions explored the idea of "inter-classism", a proposed alliance with socialist unions to combat both alleged economic exploitation and the rise of fascism in Italy. However, these efforts largely failed due to the entrenched anti-clericalism of the Italian Socialist Party, which labelled left-wing Catholicism as "idiotic" and resolved to fight them "with greater force than those on the Right." In contrast, some prominent socialists, including Antonio Gramsci, were supportive of the Left-Catholic movement. The perceived Christian spirit in the speeches of some socialist leaders was reportedly strong enough to inspire conversions to the priesthood.

=== Development and role in the Italian Resistance ===
Catholic communism developed further in the 1930s and 1940s, drawing parallels between the resurrection of Christ and the Russian Revolution. Guido Miglioli, after visiting the Soviet Union, promoted a "Christian vision of Bolshevism", arguing that a policy that rejected class struggle was destined to fail, as no collaboration could be expected from landowners. He maintained that the Bolsheviks "were welcomed by the masses as apostles and bearers of a message of social justice and brotherhood".

During World War II, Catholic communists were a significant component of the Italian resistance movement against Nazism and Fascism. The Party of the Christian Left (Partito della Sinistra Cristiana) included prominent proponents of this ideology, such as Franco Rodano, Felice Balbo, and Adriano Ossicini. The Movement of Catholic Communists was formally active from 1937 to 1945.

=== Post-war debate ===
In post-war Italy, the term cattocomunismo continued to feature in political and intellectual debate. The expression appears in the writings of philosopher Augusto Del Noce (e.g., Il cattolico comunista, 1981) and Gianni Baget Bozzo. In 1975, the journalist Enzo Bettiza used the term in his essay European Communism.

== Notable Catholic communists ==
- José Bergamín
- Raúl Castro
- Andrea Gallo
- Antonio Llidó
- Guido Miglioli
- Thomas Sankara
- Cesare Seassaro
- Manuel Perez

== See also ==
- Camilism
- Catholic social teaching
- Catholicism and socialism
- Catholic Worker Movement
- Communism
- Communitarianism
- Economic justice
- Historical materialism
- Liberation theology
  - Latin American liberation theology
- Marxism
  - Marxism-Leninism
    - Marxist–Leninist atheism
    - Marxism and religion
- Socialism
  - Religious socialism
    - Christian socialism
