= Adriano Ossicini =

Italian politician (1920–2019)

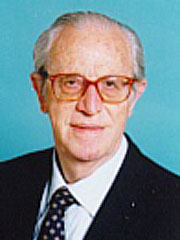

Minister for Family and Social Solidarity
- In office 17 January 1995 – 17 May 1996
- Prime Minister: Lamberto Dini
- Preceded by: Antonio Guidi
- Succeeded by: Livia Turco (Social Solidarity)

Member of the Senate
- In office 5 June 1968 – 22 April 1992
- In office 9 May 1996 – 29 May 2001

Personal details
- Born: 20 June 1920 Rome, Italy
- Died: 15 February 2019 (aged 98) Rome, Italy
- Party: SI (1968-1992); RI (1996-2001); DL (2002-2007); PD (2007-2019)
- Occupation: Medic, University professor, politician

Adriano Ossicini (born 20 June 1920) is an Italian partisan, politician, psychiatrist, academic, and Minister for Family and Social Solidarity in the Dini Cabinet.

== Biography ==
Ossicini was born in Rome on June 20, 1920.

=== During the Fascist regime ===
Ossicini's father, Cesare, was a lawyer and one of the founders of the Italian People's Party. A brilliant student, Ossicini enrolled at the Faculty of Medicine of the University of Rome, two years younger than normal. In December 1937, while still a student, he began to volunteer at the Fatebenefratelli Hospital on the Tiber Island in Rome.

In April 1938, at a FUCI Catholic students' conference held in Orvieto, Ossicini voiced his opposition to fascism. Once he returned to Rome, he was interrogated by the fascist police, who opened a file on him. In October of the same year, at a new conference of FUCI in Genoa, he appealed to Italian Catholics to oppose racism and fascism, accusing the regime of connivance with nazism.

Ossicini disagreed with the future post-war Prime Minister Alcide De Gasperi over the reconstitution of a single political party for Catholics, the future Christian Democracy, placed at the center of the political spectrum.

On 18 May 1943, Ossicini was arrested by the fascists during a raid and was imprisoned for more than two months. Despite being violently beaten for a few days, he only admitted that he had expressed criticism of racial discrimination under fascism as racism ran counter to Christian Doctrine. On this occasion, from the fascist police, he heard the term "cattocomunista" or Catho-Communist for the first time, a derogatory term for left-wing Catholics.

On 30 September 1943, Ossicini received a letter from Giulio Andreotti, in which the future Prime Minister expressed "in the name of the Pope" the opposition to unconditional co-operation between Catholics and the Italian Communist Party. Ossicini replied that he disagreed with Andreotti. Ossicini would claim that the Fatebenefratelli Hospital where he was working also received orders from the Pope to admit as many Jews as possible, something Ossicini claimed led to his supposed creation of a deadly but fictional disease known as syndrome K that was used to deter the nazis and fascists from investigating its purported sufferers, who were Jews hiding in the hospital's premises. During World War II, Ossicini became one of the founders of the Party of the Christian Left, close to the Italian Communist Party; the party was dissolved in 1945 after the Vatican's newspaper L'Osservatore Romano announced that only Christian Democracy was entitled to represent Christians in politics.

=== After World War II ===
Ossicini graduated in medicine at the end of 1944 and was admitted as a volunteer assistant at the Fatebenefratelli Hospital. He enrolled in a specialization course in Psychiatry, dealing with nervous and mental diseases; in 1947 he became a university professor of psychology at the Sapienza University of Rome.

In 1968, Ossicini returned to politics and was elected to the Italian Senate as an independent candidate in the list of the PCI. In the Senate he was a member of the group of the Independent Left closely linked to the Communist Party; Ossicini held his seat at Palazzo Madama uninterruptedly from 1968 to 1992. Between 1970 and 1989 he promoted a law for the establishment of the Order of Psychologists, which provided a regulatory framework for the profession. He was also vice-president of the Senate from 1979 to 1983 and from 1985 to 1987.

In 1995 he became Minister for Family and Social Solidarity of the Dini Cabinet, formed after the fall of the first Berlusconi I Cabinet. He joined Lamberto Dini's Italian Renewal party and was elected for the last time to the Senate in 1996. He retired from the Senate in 2001. In the 2001 elections he supported Democracy is Freedom, a liberal democrat alliance. In 2007 this latter movement merged with the ex-Communists to form the Democratic Party, which Ossicini then supported for the rest of his life.
