= Syndrome K =

Fictitious disease

Syndrome K originally in Italian as Morbo di K was a fake disease invented at the Fatebenefratelli Hospital or Ospedale Isola Tiberina – Gemelli Isola in 1943 that was said to be fatal and highly contagious. The disease was used as cover to provide refuge to Jews escaping Nazi raids in Rome on 16 October 1943. The disease was invented by the hospital doctor Giovanni Borromeo. Several documentaries have been made about the incident.

== History ==
Syndrome K was put on patient papers to indicate that the sick person wasn't sick at all, but Jewish. We created those papers for Jewish people as if they were ordinary patients, and in the moment when we had to say what disease they suffered? It was Syndrome K, meaning 'I am admitting a Jew', as if he or she were ill, but they were all healthy.

— Adriano Ossicini, 2016

Ospedale Isola Tiberina – Gemelli Isola or Fatebenefratelli Hospital on Tiber Island was a hospital and hospice before it was made into modern hospital in 1934. In 1938, Italy introduced antisemitic laws. The hospital had however allowed the Jewish doctor Vittorio Emanuele Sacerdoti to work under false papers and a fake name. With the Nazi occupation of Italy in September 1943 and the imposition of antisemitic laws against the Roman Jews, Sacerdoti – with the approval of doctors Borromeo, Adriano Ossicini (1920-2019), and Father Maurizio Bialek – brought patients from the Jewish hospital to be cared for at Fatebenefratelli.

During the Nazi raid of the Jewish ghetto in Rome on 16 October 1943, Jewish escapees sought refuge at the hospital. Borromeo and Ossicini accepted them and declared that these new "patients" had been diagnosed with a contagious, fatal disease called Il Morbo di K ("the Syndrome K"), which could be interpreted as standing for "Koch disease" or "Kreps disease". The name was suggested by physician and anti-fascist activist Adriano Ossicini. The letter K was designated for the Jewish refugees to distinguish them from real patients. K was derived from the German officers Albert Kesselring, who led the troops in Rome, and from Sicherheitspolizei and Sicherheitsdienst chief Herbert Kappler, who was appointed as city police chief. "Syndrome K" was purported to be a neurological illness whose symptoms included convulsions, dementia, paralysis, and, ultimately, death from asphyxiation. The doctors created an isolated ward in Assunta Hall. While the symptoms of the disease were deliberately kept ambiguous, the Nazis were noted to refrain from investigating the hospital or even to conduct searches for Jews on the premises out of fear of contracting the disease. The Jewish patients were advised to appear ill and to cough loudly, affecting symptoms similar to tuberculosis.

Besides Bialek and Borromeo, other doctors on staff assisted the Jewish patients and helped to move them to safer hideouts outside the hospital. In May 1944, the hospital was raided and five Jews from Poland were detained; however, the ruse saved approximately 100 refugees. Bialek and Borromeo also installed an illegal radio transmitter in the hospital basement and made contact with General Roberto Lordi of the Italian Royal Air Force. After World War II, Borromeo was lauded by government of Italy for his work and was recognized as a Righteous Among the Nations by Yad Vashem. He died in the hospital on 24 August 1961.

A film “Syndrome K” was released in 2021 that documented the episode with enactments, archival footage and interviews.
