= Michele Maylender =

Hungarian politician (1863–1911)

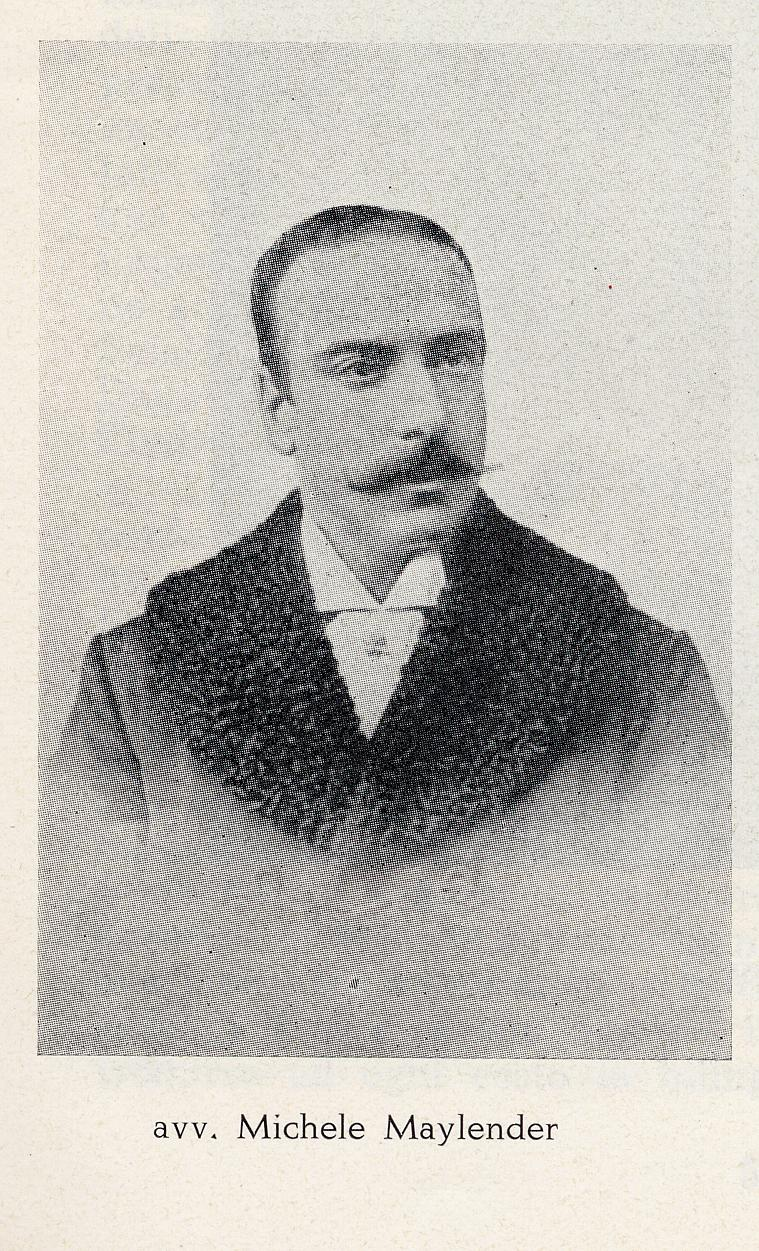
Michele Maylender

Michele Maylender (Hungarian: Maylender Mihály) (September 11, 1863 – 1911) was a politician from Austria-Hungary who was the founder of the Autonomist Association, known also as the Autonomist Party in Fiume.

Michele Maylender was born in Fiume (today Rijeka), then part of the Austrian Empire, as a son of a Jewish merchant. After schooling in Fiume Maylender went to Kolosvar and then to Budapest to study law. In 1888 he became doctor juris and in 1890 passes the exams for a lawyer. In 1891 he opened a legal office in Fiume, where he showed excellent professional skills. Maylender was among the founders in 1893 of a literary circle, which became the largest Italian cultural venue in Fiume.

In 1896 Maylender, claiming greater autonomy from the centralizing Hungarian executive of Dezső Bánffy, founded the Autonomist Party. The initiative was successful and in 1897 Maylender was elected mayor, succeeding to the late Giovanni de Ciotta, who held the position continuously from 1872 to 1896. The election of Maylender was the decisive signal of political change under way in Fiume. It culminated when the Municipal council of Fiume was dissolved and was finally replaced by a Royal Commissioner, the ministerial adviser Antonio de Valentsits in 1898. After that Maylender started a weekly magazine "La Difesa" where the autonomist claims were made explicit.

When in 1901 Kálmán Széll succeeded to Dezső Bánffy as Hungarian Prime Minister he seriously tried to restore a positive climate in the city, and Maylender was once again elected to the office of mayor. Meanwhile, the mandate of the fiuman deputy at the Hungarian parliament was about to expire. In the new climate the majority of the Autonomist Party thought "it was time to send an Italian" (the office was held by Count Tivadar Batthyány) and it addressed Maylender. Maylender refused, and Luigi Ossoinack(head of the Royal Hungarian Sea Navigation Company "Adria", and, as one of the wealthiest fiumani, the main funder of the Autonomist Party) decided to advance the candidacy of the young Riccardo Zanella. Although Batthyány (publicly backed by Maylender) won over Zanella, Maylender resigned few months after and withdrew from politics, officially he devoted himself to historical studies and started the monumental "History of the Academies of Italy" a work, published posthumously, of still unmatched scope.

Maylender returned to active politics in 1911, when he accepted to run as Fiuman deputy at the Hungarian parliament. He was elected but died suddenly hit by a stroke at the couloirs of the parliament in Budapest in 1911. He was not related to Samuel Maylender, a physician and socialist leader in Fiume, who later joined the Communist Party of Fiume in 1921. The sister Edvige Maylender married Antonio Grossich, world-known surgeon who in 1908 introduced tincture of iodine for rapid sterilisation of the human skin, and future head of the Italian National Council of Fiume in 1918.
