= Rijeka Natural History Museum =

Museum in Rijeka, Croatia

Coordinates: 45°19′46″N 14°26′39″E

The Rijeka Natural History Museum (Croatian: Prirodoslovni muzej Rijeka) is the first regional museum in the Rijeka area. It was founded on 16 May 1876, and opened to the public on 1 May 1946. It is located in the Nikola Hosta Park, near the governor's palace, in the family building of Count Negroni.

== History ==
The development of natural sciences at the end of the 19th century, the great interest of scientists in marine research in the Rijeka area, the reputation of natural scientists who worked in the Rijeka area and numerous natural science collections owned by private individuals led to the establishment of the Natural History Museum, the first regional museum in the Rijeka area. The date of foundation of the Natural History Museum in Rijeka is considered to be 16 May 1876, when Dr. Josef Roman Lorenz sent a detailed program for the development of the regional natural history museum to the mayor of Rijeka, Giovanni de Ciotta.
