= Il Lavoratore =

Il Lavoratore ("The Worker") was the organ of the Austrian Socialist party and a pacifist paper with ties to Austria through links between Italian and Austrian Socialist parties, out in Trieste. In 1921 it became the organ of the Communist Party of Italy in Trieste. One of its first editors was Cesare Seassaro from Pavia, who died in Fiume on 15 November 1921, where he came to give "organisational support" from the Communist Party of Italy in building the Communist Party of Fiume. After Seassaro Ignazio Silone became the editor of Il Lavoratore in 1922.
