= Andrea Ossoinack =

Italian-Hungarian politician (1876–1965)

Andrea Ossoinack (1876-1965) was a businessman and politician who became notable in the process of creating the Free State of Fiume.

== Biography ==
Andrea Ossoinack was the son of Luigi Ossoinack, one of the foremost businessmen in Fiume. He studied economics in England, and then spent time at his father's company branch office in London.

After initially helping Riccardo Zanella and his Autonomist Association, Ossoinack later founded the Autonomist League (Lega autonoma) with the Hungarian loyalist grouping.

In 1916 he was nominated (rather than elected) as the deputy from Fiume in the Hungarian Parliament. On 18 October 1918, at the end of the First World War, Ossoinack claimed the right of self-determination for Fiume in the Hungarian parliament. In this capacity he was also allowed to represent Fiume at the Paris Peace Conference, 1919 on 3 March 1919, being presented as the "last deputy of Fiume at the Hungarian Parliament".

Ossoinack was a local entrepreneur with business and political contacts. He financed all the political organisation of Fiume including the autonomists of Maylender and Zanella. He spoke several languages and, having studied economics in London, was fluent in English.

Ossoinack came to the Conference with a Memorandum from the CNI expressing views similar to those presented in Budapest. The document begins with the statement that a profoundly unjust political system (the Habsburg Monarchy) founded on the principle of divide et impera had finally broken up, leading to the formation of several new states, including Fiume. It was stated that, "The State of Fiume is a living fact: none can deny it, as none can deny existence of a Hungary or of a Yugoslavia. Fiume exercises all the functions of State; this has been communicated to the governments of Europe and America; it freely develops all the functions of administration". On this basis a sovereign political body, a functioning state, had the right to be annexed to Italy, since this was the will of the majority of the population.

Ossoinack met with United States President Woodrow Wilson on 4 April 1919, a day after the meeting of the Council of Four where Wilson resolutely opposed Italian claims to Fiume. Wilson added also new requirements: self-determination in the eastern Adriatic area to produce economically viable outcomes. Ossoinack produced an economic-based argument for the annexation of Fiume to Italy, attempting to show that annexation was the best economic solution for Fiume. Openly he proclaimed that the free port was economically non-viable: he said it could have been made competitive only with lower operating costs. This was not the case; the port of Fiume prospered only because it was generously subsidised by the Hungarian government and this would end if it gained independence. Fiume needed a state prepared to invest in the city economy concerning the port. In his reply to Ossoinack, Wilson proposed that Fiume had to be proclaimed a Free State, as a new solution.

When the British delegate Balfour refused the project of annexing Fiume, the Italian delegation of Orlando and Sonnino left the conference in protest on 24 April 1919.
