= Giovanni Borromeo =

Italian physician

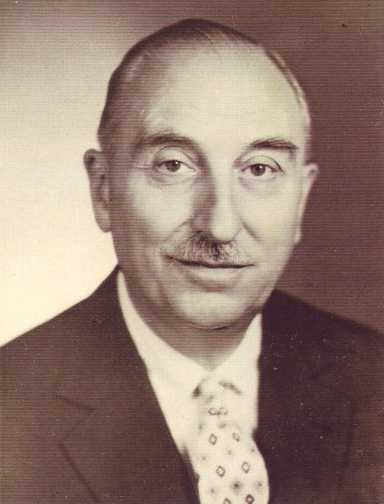
Giovanni Borromeo

Giovanni Borromeo (Rome, December 15, 1898 – Rome, August 24, 1961) was an Italian physician. In 2004 Yad Vashem recognized him as a “Righteous among the Nations” for saving five members of the Almagià and extended family (Clotilde and Gina Almagià, Luciana Tedesco, Claudio Tedesco, Gabriella Ajo). Borromeo had been a student and assistant of Marco Almajà, a highly respected professor of physiopathology at the University of Rome.

== Early life ==
Giovanni Borromeo was the son of the well known physician, Pietro Borromeo. While studying medicine at the University of Rome, he was drafted in World War I. Upon his return he earned a bronze medal. At age 22, Borromeo received his degree in medicine. According to his son, in 1931 he was appointed director of the "Ospedali Riuniti di Roma" but was banned from accepting the position because he was not a member of the Fascist Party. This claim has never been substantiated by evidence.

On December 2, 1933, Borromeo married Maria Adelaide Mangani. They had 3 children: Beatrice (1934), Pietro (1937) and Maria Cristina (1943).

== Career ==
In 1934, he was appointed director of the Ospedale Fatebenefratelli on the Tiberina Island downtown Rome. He and Prior Maurizio Bialek, continued the renovation that the hospital had begun in 1922 transforming an old medical hospice into a modern and efficient infrastructure. The Fatebenefratelli was considered an extraterritorial zone, since it belonged to the Hospitaller Order of Saint John of God that had purchased it in 1892 from the Kingdom of Italy and made it part of its worldwide chain of hospitals.

Among the medical staff were two young doctors with a precarious position, Vittorio Emanuele Sacerdoti and Adriano Ossicini: they left the only known first hand recollections of life at the hospital during the war. Sacerdoti was Jewish and the nephew of Prof. Almagià, Borromeo's teacher. Ossicini was a Catholic antifascist who had eluded prison several times. In 1998 Sacerdoti gave a long interview at the Shoah Foundation and in 2005 Ossicini wrote a memoir entitled Un'isola sul Tevere (An Island in the Tiber).

Through their memories we learn that, after the armistice of September 8, 1943, during the Nazi occupation of Rome, the Fatebenefratelli became a crucible of fugitives, carabinieri, colonial police, deserters, resistance fighters, antifascists, and eventually, after the liberation, also republican fascists. Both Ossicini and Sacerdoti indicate that, after the armed clashes of September 8, 1943, a group of physicians at the hospital secretly organized to offer medical assistance to resistance fighters. Sacerdoti states that, because he was "in danger" anyway, he was often sent to the woods around Rome to tend to wounded partisans. Above all, Sacerdoti recounts that he provided care and, when available, medicines, to many Jews living in the old ghetto, across the street from the hospital.

On September 8, 1943, after the announcement of the Armistice of Cassibile between Italy and the Allies, the King and the Army abandoned Rome. Mussolini was liberated by his German allies and established the Italian Social Republic (RSI) whose territory extended from south of Naples to the Alps. The army received no precise orders and many of its commanders followed Pietro Badoglio and the King. Rome fell under German control headed by Herbert Kappler. Prefect Pietro Caruso took on the RSI administration who provided Kappler with infrastructure, manpower and information. Besides the German SS, fascist militia and collaborators were everywhere. The city suffered a severe shortage of food. After the round up of 1,200 Jews on October 16, 1943, during the 9 months of occupation, more than 1,000 Jews were denounced and arrested, and transported to the concentration camp of Fossoli di Carpi and then to Auschwitz.

According to Sacerdoti's deposition at the Shoah Foundation, at the Fatebenefratelli there were two occurrences of aid to Jews. Both Ossicini and Sacerdoti state that a small group of Jews was admitted with a diagnosis of Koch disease, which was quite common in those days. Doctors also internally referred to the fugitive "Koch" patients using the code-letter "K", in reference to the German commander Arthur Kesselring. Ossicini attributes the idea of the K codeword to Sacerdoti. Sacerdoti however, remembered it as no more than an anecdote and when asked to identify the source of the codeword, responded: "I don't know, it was something people said, perhaps the director".

Ossicini's and Sacerdoti's recollection concerning the episode of aid to the Jews differ substantially insofar as dates, number of people and course of events. Both differ from Borromeo's son's book about his father's rescue of the Jews, which was written in 2007, thus many years after the others. Sacerdoti and Ossicini credit Borromeo for his humanity.

Borromeo's participation in the resistance has not been the subject of studies and his name does not appear in any major historiographical account. According to Ossicini, he had always been suspicious of the Catholic alliance with the fascist regime and, at the time of the German occupation, leaned towards the resistance, although he never actively took part in it. According to Borromeo's son, together with Prior Bialek, Borromeo kept a radio in the basement of the hospital to keep contacts with the partisans, especially with his close friend Roberto Lordi. In his interview, Sacerdoti suggested that, in general, the doctors at Fatebenefratelli kept away from politics. He mentioned Borromeo by name only once defining him "a very Catholic man".

Borromeo had in fact close ties to the Vatican. After the war, he became friends with Alcide De Gasperi, also an antifascist with strong connections in the Vatican who was Prime Minister between 1945 and 1953. As a member of the Christian Democratic Party, he became Counselor for public health of the Municipality of Rome. Borromeo died at the Fatebenefratelli hospital in August 1961.

After the war he was awarded a silver Medal of Civil Valor and, forty-three years after his death, he was recognized “Righteous among the Nations” by Yad Vashem for protecting the family of his mentor, Marco Almajà.

== Vittorio Sacerdoti and Adriano Ossicini ==
Vittorio Sacerdoti was a young physician who had lost his position at the Ancona hospital following the Racial Laws. His uncle Marco Almagià recommended him to his former student, Giovanni Borromeo. In 1941, facing a shortage of doctors, Borromeo called Sacerdoti and gave him a position. Within a few days Sacerdoti was reported to the police and dismissed. A young policeman took pity on him and suggested he remain at the hospital as a student practitioner, which, considering that the hospital was outside of the jurisdiction of Italy, would be tolerated. As time went by, through another influential uncle, Elio Ottolenghi, Sacerdoti bought false papers and worked under the name of Vittorio Salviucci. He continued to work at the hospital until after the liberation of Rome on June 4, 1944. In his recollection, Sacerdoti states that after September 8, 1943 some doctors at the hospital secretly and routinely offered their services to the resistance. He does not mention who was part of the group but makes clear that as the Axis' defeat became imminent, the clergy and staff at the hospital increasingly demonstrated tolerance for the efforts against the Germans.

Adriano Ossicini was a psychiatrist and an antifascist who had been imprisoned several times. His close ties to the Vatican however, had eventually kept him out of jail. He belonged to the Catholic Resistance Movement and, although he could no longer work officially, maintained a semi-clandestine base at the Fatebenefratelli as a volunteer physician. From Ossicini's memoir it remains unclear how steady his presence at the hospital was, especially since, after September 8, his participation in the resistance fight intensified and his position became more tenuous. Ossicini became part of the CNL (National Liberation Committee) and worked in the transition government led by Ferrucci Parri. In the postwar years he became known as an innovative psychiatrist and a leading figure in the Christian Democratic left.

== Sources concerning the rescue of Jews ==
Sources concerning the aid to Jews at the Fatebenefratelli present some discrepancies. Pietro Borromeo's 2007 book and Gordon Thomas' divulgative 2012 apologetic book on Pius XII's silence claim that Borromeo had planned the rescue of Jews and devised a non-existent syndrome (the K syndrome) to keep them safely as patients in disguise. This version of the story places the events in the weeks preceding the round up of October 16.

Contrary to this thesis, both Sacerdoti and Ossicini date the episode concerning the Jews as October 16, 1943. Sacerdoti states that 27 Jews, who were his patients and knew they could trust him, sought him out for help. According to Sacerdoti's deposition he authorized their admission with the diagnosis of Koch disease and that Borromeo and the Prior "did not oppose his action". These patients remained at the hospital for few days and then were dismissed. Sacerdoti believed that many were subsequently denounced and arrested. Sacerdoti and Ossicini indicate that "K" was only an internal code-word to indicate all fugitive Koch patients, not exclusively Jewish.

The evidence that led Yad Vashem to the recognition is consistent with this second version.

In is article "October 16th, 1943", Ossicini cites a specific episode and connects it with Borromeo's actions: "I remember the heart-wrenching cry of a mother on Reginella Street. She yelled to her small son: ‘Run, 'bello di mamma', run away!’. This admission of Jews as if they were patients became more frequent, with the help of the courageous professor Giovanni Borromeo. For this action, he then received a solemn recognition from the State of Israel".

In his deposition 10 years earlier at the Shoah Foundation, Sacerdoti had narrated an identical episode he witnessed when he got up at dawn for the morning rounds (the hospital overlooks the Jewish quarter). Sacerdoti circumscribed the admission of Jews to the October 16th event and Borromeo's aid to members of the Almagià-Ajò family who in fact provided the only testimonies from beneficiaries of Borromeo's actions.

It is possible that Ossicini, who also stated in the book that he was in hiding and could not remain at the hospital during the occupation, did not witness the October 16th event directly but mixed his own memories of the time with a story he had heard from Sacerdoti.

Pietro Borromeo and Gordon Thomas attribute to Giovanni Borromeo the invention of a non-existent disease (the K Disease) that would have allowed him to admit hundreds of Jewish patients. Their version of the facts focuses only on Jewish rescue ignoring completely the broader situation narrated by Sacerdoti and Ossicini.

== Film ==
Giovanni Borromeo's story has recently become the topic of a film, "My Italian Secret," which the Italy and the Holocaust Foundation commissioned to documentary maker Oren Jacoby.The Foundation, whose mission is to "share the little known story of the role of Italy in the rescue of the Jews", has among its supporters Pave the Way and is financed by Italian American magnates including Kenneth Langone and Joseph Perella who serves as its president.

"My Italian Secret" embraces Pietro Borromeo's and Gordon Thomas' version of the story and focuses only on the anecdotes of the non-existent disease without any reference to other historical references. The foundation's president Joseph Perella had initially announced the film as a tribute to Giovanni Palatucci. Following the publication of the data on Palatucci's work as an employee under the fascist regime, the Italian Social Republic and the Germans, the film's protagonists remained Giovanni Borromeo and Gino Bartali.
