= Giovanni Giuriati =

Italian politician (1876–1970)

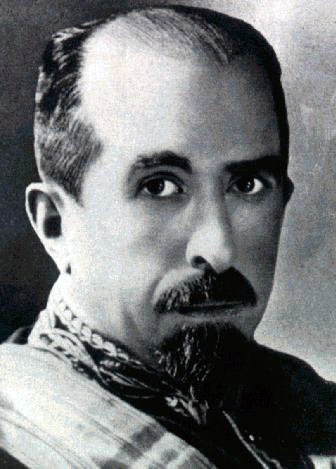

President of the Chamber of Deputies
- In office 20 April 1929 – 19 January 1934
- Preceded by: Antonio Casertano
- Succeeded by: Costanzo Ciano

President of the Free State of Fiume
- In office 22 March 1922 – 16 September 1923
- Preceded by: Riccardo Zanella
- Succeeded by: Gaetano Giardino (Military Governor of Fiume)

Personal details
- Born: 4 August 1876 Venice, Kingdom of Italy
- Died: 6 May 1970 (aged 93) Rome, Italy
- Party: Autonomist Association (1896–1914); Italian Nationalist Association (1914–1923); National Fascist Party (1923–1943)

Giovanni Giuriati (4 August 1876 – 6 May 1970) was an Italian fascist politician.

== Biography ==
Giuriati was born in Venice in 1876.

A law graduate and lawyer, he associated in 1903 with the irredentist group Trento e Trieste ("Trento and Trieste" – regions which it aimed to have secede from Austria-Hungary), and soon became its president. In early 1915, he channelled aid from Italians in Austria for the earthquake-hit town of Avezzano, and volunteered as a soldier in World War I. Wounded in the First Battle of the Isonzo, and again in the Third, he was twice decorated.

He returned to his legal practice as the war ended, but decided to follow the paramilitary movement of Gabriele D'Annunzio, as it attempted to seize the "unredeemed" and disputed port of Fiume (today Rijeka). When Giuriati arrived in Fiume, D’Annunzio made him his Prime Minister, but he resigned and left Fiume before it fell, having failed to persuade D’Annunzio to accept the modus vivendi proposed by the Italian government. D'Annunzio gave Giuriati command of the Carnaro legion in Zara and, in February 1920, sent him to Paris in a vain attempt to be admitted at the peace conference, as a representative of the military government of Fiume. Giuriati then worked to found the Fiume League, in opposition to the League of Nations, to represent all the peoples and interests sacrificed at Versailles.

The forces of Fiume were defeated in December 1920 by regular Italian troops, after they had ignored the provisions of the Treaty of Rapallo and even declared war on Italy. Nonetheless, Giuriati briefly served as provisional President of the territory after a coup d'état against the government of the Free State of Fiume in March 1922. Meanwhile, he had joined the Partito Nazionale Fascista (PNF), being elected to the Italian Chamber of Deputies in 1921.

After the March on Rome, Giovanni Giuriati became Minister of Freed Territories in the Benito Mussolini government, and took over the Ministry of Public Works in 1925. He was President of the Chamber of Deputies between 1929 and 1934, and national secretary of the PNF 1930-31. After 1934, he served as senator.

In 1943, he joined the condemnation of Italy's participation in the Axis, agreeing to the coup carried out by Dino Grandi inside the Grand Council of Fascism. The Italian Social Republic, a Fascist state recreated by Nazi Germany in Northern Italy, engineered the in absentia Verona trial against Grandi and his pro-Allies collaborators, during which Giuriati was sentenced to death. He escaped the wave of repression, and remained in liberated Italy. Charges of political corruption brought against him at the end of World War II were cleared, and Giuriati retired to a low profile life.

He died in Rome in 1970.

Political offices
Preceded by Antonio Casertano	President of the Italian Chamber of Deputies; 1929–1934	Succeeded by Costanzo Ciano
