= Autonomist Association =

Austrian political party

- Italian name: Associazione Autonoma
- Croatian name: Autonomna stranka
- President: Riccardo Zanella
- Founder: Giovanni de Ciotta
- Founded: 1896
- Dissolved: 1914
- Merged into: Italian Nationalist Association (after annexation to Italy)
- Newspaper: La Difesa
- Ideology: Italian nationalism Italian irredentism Conservatism
- Political position: Right-wing

The Autonomist Association (Italian: Associazione Autonoma, Partito Autonomo; Croatian: Autonomna stranka, Autonomaška stranka) was a political party in Fiume, that existed continuously from 1896 to 1914. Its goal was to maintain the autonomy of the corpus separatum of Fiume within the Hungarian Kingdom.

== Origins ==
It is very difficult to trace the origins of the party, since it appeared as an organised political grouping only in 1896. However, already at the municipal elections in 1887 a party named Partito Autonomo appeared, but nothing is known about its internal composition and goals. Moreover, very similar claims were already in the 1860s when the priority was to gain autonomy from Croatia In its mature form fiuman Autonomists were focused in assuring a greater deal of autonomy for Fiume within the Lands of the Crown of Saint Stephen, from the 1880s up to 1914.

== The First Phase (1896–1902) ==
In 1896 Michele Maylender, claiming greater autonomy from the centralizing Hungarian executive of Dezső Bánffy, founded the Autonomist Party. The initiative was successful and in 1897 Maylender was elected mayor, succeeding to the late Giovanni de Ciotta, who held the position continuously from 1872 to 1897. The election of Maylender was the decisive signal of political change under way in Fiume. It culminated when the Municipal council of Fiume was dissolved and was finally replaced by a Royal Commissioner, the ministerial adviser Antonio de Valentsits in 1898. After that Maylender started a weekly magazine La Difesa where the autonomist claims were made explicit. La Difesa, the official party paper of the Associazione Autonoma, was the first modern political party paper in Fiume, directed and founded by Maylender, who was also probably the owner. The paper started its publication on 1 January 1899, in Sušak on the Croatian side, where the Croatian (Austrian) laws on the press were in force.

== The Concept of Nation and State ==
La Difesa represented first of all, a defensive movement – as stated by the title of its paper meaning defence. The autonomist interpretation of the Hungarian state was primarily aimed at reducing Hungarian sovereignty and political subjectivity: the Hungarian government was a temporary authority, since the city was not an integral part of Hungary. Although Hungary assured prosperity to the city, in the interpretation of autonomists, Hungarian rule was provisory in the sense that it could always have been receded. As the Croats, they denied the existence of a unitary Hungarian state but instead it was the “Holy Crown of the Lands of St. Stephen”, united under the sceptre of the House of Habsburg. Fiume was one of the Lands that constituted the Hungarian state, together with the Kingdom of Hungary and the Triune Kingdom of Croatia, Slavonia, and Dalmatia. The City of Fiume itself was annexed to Hungary by force of the diploma of Maria Theresa.

As for sovereignty, neither Hungary nor Croatia who were claiming their sovereignty over Fiume were sovereign states nor subjects of international law, that status pertained only to Austria – that is to the Habsburg monarchy. The Austro-Hungarian Compromise of 1867 was an internal administrative arrangement, to which Croatia was similarly related to Hungary. In the analysis done by La Difesa and reported on several articles it was inadmissible for Fiume to be treated as a colony since its status within the Habsburg Empire or the Hungarian Kingdom was comparable to that of Hungary.

La Difesa reviewed the position of cities with a comparable status to Fiume. Trieste and the privileged position it enjoyed in Austria was the obvious prime example. Germany, during the process of unification, that the Hungarians frequently referred to as a model, provided another interesting parallel. While the continental free cities lost their rights and privileges "disappearing politically" not so those of the Hanseatic league such as Lübeck, Bremen and Hamburg. States that foster economic development via the maritime trade give to free ports ample liberties sanctioned by statutes in order to leave them free that with their international connections knowledge and expertise. Thus the proper institutional model for Fiume was the "Hanseatic model".

But what about the nationality of the autonomists? Maylender defined the "Fiuman nationality" as a specific nationality: if Fiumans had to change their nationality accordingly to their sovereigns they would have changed at least 7 nationalities since 1509: his answer was that no one fitted perfectly to them, thus they were a national.

== The Populist Drive ==
When in 1901 Kálmán Széll succeeded to Dezső Bánffy as Hungarian Prime Minister he seriously tried to restore a positive climate in the city, and Maylender was once again elected to the office of mayor. Meanwhile, the mandate of the Fiuman deputy at the Hungarian parliament was about to expire. In the new climate the majority of the Autonomist Party thought "it was time to send an Italian" (the office was held by count Lajos Batthyány) and it addressed Maylender. Maylender refused, and Luigi Ossoinack decided to advance the candidacy of the young Riccardo Zanella.

Maylender was ousted from public life, and the Autonomist Party replaces its leader with Francesco Vio, who is elected podestà to replace Maylender, on 10 January 1902. Vio was a representative of the moderate current within the Associazione Autonoma, but the man behind the scenes was certainly still Luigi Ossoinack, who continued to finance the party.

Although Batthyany (publicly backed by Maylender) won over Zanella, Maylender resigned few months after and withdrew from politics, officially he devoted himself to historical studies and started the monumental "History of the Academies of Italy" a work, published posthumously, of still unmatched scope.

Zanella was now entering the scene. Schooled in the Hungarian schools in Fiume, and a graduate from the Commercial Academy in Budapest, possessed the right blend of characteristics: a good command of Hungarian and other languages, a network of friends, knowledge of administration and intellectual and psychological inferiority compared to his sponsors. He will manage to become the most popular Fiuman political leader ever.

But there was also a more substantial change: while Maylender was (as Ciotta had previously been) the men of the Party of Government that is the Liberal Party of Deak and Tisza, Zanella felt much closer to the Kossuthian current within the Hungarian political scene. The clash between Liberalism and radicalism in Hungary, was since the 1850s reflected also in Fiume with Gaspare Matcovich as the local leader of the Kossuthists and Giovanni de Ciotta of the Deákist faction.

A silent revolution was consumed within the ranks of the autonomists. On 4 April 1902, in the article "Metamorfosi di un partito" on his Voce del popolo, Zanella in an analysis of the political situation in Hungary, depicted the Hungarian Liberal Party as an aristocratic expression of Hungarian national feelings, while the "Party of 1848" is the popular and democratic form of the same. There was no difference in contents or the political project, it was only the external visual manifestation that changed, following the evolution of Hungarian society.

Zanella adapted the arguments of Kossuthian populism to the Fiuman situation: claiming that in Fiume increasingly the economy and society was controlled by Hungarians, he mirrored the Kossuthian claims about the Austrian dominance upon Hungary. From the beginnings he will resort to rhetoric borrowed from Italian nationalism and irredentism, anticipated already by his first electoral proclaim.

Zanella, writing in 1905, claimed that there was a genuine Fiuman nationality and identity that comprised Italian, Croatian, and Hungarian elements as well, and that was loyal to the (multinational) State of the Crown of St. Stephen, not to Hungary (that was a nation). Zanella claimed that it was offensive for the Fiumani to be labelled as "Italians" by the Hungarian government. According to Zanella, the inhabitants of Fiume are called Fiumani but are themselves composed of "three nationalities": the Italians that is the autonomists who were for centuries the "old dominators of the land" but also the Croats and the Hungarians. Zanella changed the paradigm: Hungary had its state right within the Empire since it was the land of the Magyar nation. Similarly, Croatia retained its autonomy and state right because of its historical and national specificity. The same applied to Fiume: as kossuthism and the Independence and 1848 Party proclaimed national independence as the ultimate political goal for Hungarians, in Fiume both Frano Supilo and Zanella started their policies of "New Course". Both paths were basically secessionist and ready to look at new allies (Serbs for Supilo, with the resulting Resolution of Fiume) and Croats for Zanella, who helped Supilo providing him with the necessary contacts with the Kossuthian faction in Hungary.

== Cleavages ==
The cleavage between the Deákists and Kossuthists in Fiume was to reappear soon. Andrea Ossoinack the son of Luigi (who committed suicide in 1902), announced a secession from the Autonomist Party, remarking that all the nationalities (and thereby also the Croatian) in Fiume had the right to be represented, and the need for a closer collaboration with Hungary, precondition for the economical development of the port city. Thus, in the 1905 elections for the Fiuman representative at the Hungarian parliament, Andrea Ossoinack was publicly supported by the governor Ervin báró Roszner. Against him runs Zanella, the candidate of a "committee of citizens" led by the old Kossuthist Antonio Walluschnig. Andrea Ossoinack helped Zanella and financially supported his paper La Voce del Popolo. Now, in 1905, they were opposed to each other. Andrea Ossoinack from a champion of the militant autonomists (as was his father) will gradually position himself as a reliable political partner for the Hungarians against the Kossuthist drift. But, on 29 January 1905, Riccardo Zanella won and was elected Fiuman representative at the Hungarian parliament. 1905 was the only time that the Independence and 1848 party, won the elections but the King Franz Joseph rejected the result. Chamber had been dissolved by military force (19 February 1906), and a uniformed colonel read a royal decree dissolving it. Géza Fejérváry, formerly minister for national defence was appointed prime minister in a government of bureaucrats. The former "united opposition" (with whom Zanella sided) was allowed to form a government only after it gave up its major demands for an independent Hungarian army and tariff system.

Political instability resulting from the Hungarian Constitutional Crisis of 1903–1907 was felt in Fiume as well, as governors were changed frequently. The pact concluded (8 April 1906) between the Coalition and the crown paved the way for the Agreement, reached in October 1907 thanks chiefly to the sobering of Hungarian opinion by a severe economic crisis. In Fiume already on 28 June 1907, with 45 votes on 52 voters, the civic Rappresentanza elected Francesco Vio as mayor of Fiume. Zanella got only 6 ballots, and his extremism was not rewarded by the electorate. On 15 June 1908 there was a congress of the Autonomist Association where, after the defeat, Zanella was emarginated.

During 1908 and 1909 life in Fiume appeared still: apart from growing national polarisation of the Italian with the Croatians, the relations with the Hungarian government appeared to be improving. On 15 June 1909 – the Congress of the Autonomist Association elects a "Provisional Directorate" with the task of reorganizing the party for the next extraordinary congress.

On 25 June 1909, Governor Sándor gróf Nákó de Nagyszentmiklós resigned, and now the vice governor István gróf Wickenburg de Capelló, an heir of the Austro-Venetian nobility, was put in his place. In January 1910 in Hungary was a big political change: the Hungarian Liberal Party reorganised and appeared with the new name of National Labour Party whose leader was still Count István Tisza. The municipal elections took place on 13 April 1910 – the Autonomist Party won the elections convincingly in the city casting 718 ballots out of 845 voters, but what was more important Maylender returned to active politics after almost a decade of exile spent on finishing his monumental Storia delle Accademie d'Italia. On 8 June 1910 at the new elections in Hungary for the Parliament, Maylender wins convincingly with 970 votes against Zanella who gets 566, out of 2.337 electors.

Károly Khuen-Héderváry, a consummate political leader, who as Ban (title) had previously ruled Croatia for twenty years from 1883 to 1903, now on 17 January 1910, become head of the Hungarian executive. He will rule Hungary for two years up to 22 April 1912, and as in Croatia will prove very efficient in crushing opposition in Fiume as well. On 15 June 1910 after the defeat the new direction of the Autonomist Party (the Associazione autonoma) is elected: Zanella, was nominated president. The Autonomist Party was now de facto divided in two factions, since both of the candidates were officially autonomists. On 23 June 1910, at the Rappresentanza Civica Zanella spoke against the persecutions to which the Italians are victims in Fiume and concludes that Hungary is about to lose Fiume if it will continue this discriminatory policy against the local population. On 26 June 1910, podestà Francesco Vio resigns, adducing motives of health. There is thus a creeping conflict: he is between the Hungarians of Khuen and Wickenburg and the local opposition led by Zanella and Baccich, that becomes more and more aggressive. The provisional podestà was now Corossacz, an ally of Zanella.

On 30 November 1910 István gróf Wickenburg de Capelló, took office as acting governor but the official ceremony instead at the municipal hall was celebrated at the cathedral church. The event infringed the tradition and was discussed even at the Hungarian parliament, on December, the 9th 1910. Maylender, who backed the governor, was attacked by Tivadar Batthyány with the argument that since it was Maylender who created Autonomism and championed the struggle against Banffy he should have been among the first to react. Albert Appony claimed that the preservation of Fiuman autonomy was a strategic interest of Hungary since any action in the opposite direction would have given greater chances to Croatian propaganda to succeed.

The reactions in Fiume were immediate: on 16 December 1910 – at the session of the Rappresentanza, Zanella exploits the moment and fiercely attacks Maylender with a lengthy speech. Possibly related to this attack on February the 9th 1911, Maylender suddenly dies at the Hungarian parliament in Budapest, by a heart stroke.

The ongoing division within the Autonomists successfully infiltrated by Hungarian authorities produced its effects: on 2 April 1911 – a New party named Lega autonoma was formed whose head is the ex podestà Francesco Vio. The strategy of the Lega was much less based on the exploitation of the public opinion in any sense or direction. Its exponents were in fact prominent businessman (think of Ossoinack and the heavily subsidised Adria) that lived and prospered thanks to Hungarian economy.

Both groups were playing opportunistically. The group of Zanella (the Associazione Autonoma) followed daily Hungarian politics, trying to cut all possible alliances. Vio appears to keep distance from Zanella openly condemning its conflicting stance towards the Hungarian authorities that "did much harm to the city". Zanella attacked the leghisti as they were called because of their unabashed compromising attitude with the Hungarians.

On May the 5th 1911, after the death of Maylender, elections Zanella is again the champion of the Fiuman (and Hungarian) Kossuthist opposition to replace the Fiuman representative at the Hungarian parliament. Antonio Vio junior, is candidate from the «Lega autonoma» and the Hungarian labour party, headed by count Istvan Tisza. Vio won over Zanella, and on 8 June 1911 – the «Lega autonoma» made public its programme and the candidates. Several former members of the Associazione Autonoma are now in its ranks: including Vio, Ossoinack, Mohovich, and others now lined up with Governor Wickemburg and Khuen-Hedervary. On 20 June 1911, at the Municipal elections, the Lega Autonoma of Vio defeats the Associazione Autonoma of Zanella for just 46 ballots. Some of the Associazione Autonoma enter however in the Rappresentanza.

In the years before the outbreak of the Great War it is clear that the Hungarian government under the lead of Khuen who effectively put into control Croatia attempted to do the same in Fiume. And as in Croatia Khuen was successful in Fiume, achieving a complete victory for the Hungarian government. Zanella was now pushed towards Italian irredentism.

== First World War ==
The central government, with Khuen as the Prime Minister of Hungary succeeded to put Fiuman politics under complete control, and that already before the Great War broke. Obviously, the possibilities for the Fiumani to have an influence in local politics was greatly reduced, being confined at the defence of the municipal italianità.

The administration of the tiny corpus separatum, was now entrusted to the Giunta governiale amministrativa, an administrative body whose members were appointed by the Hungarian Governor in Fiume. The Municipal Police was now sided by the Hungarian State Police, the judiciary had its Courts of Appeal in Budapest, and there was an Administrative Tribunal in Fiume as well that as the Tribunal, were firmly under Hungarian control. The number of Hungarian schools was rising continuously, as well as the proportion of those in Italian where more and more classes were taught in Hungarian. Finally, in 1912 a "Superior Commercial Academy" was instituted in Fiume, a first step for a planned Hungarian university. Therefore, the ongoing conflict with the Hungarian government reached its height at a time of maximum prosperity and economic development of the "Jewel of the Hungarian Crown".

On 20 June 1913 the Governor suspends the Rappresentanza for "opposition to the laws of the State", and for "perturbation" of the "constituted order". In Fiume the political climate was very tense and all the political fractions in the city were opposing the governmental measures. Disillusion was the dominant feeling in Fiume of 1914, fuelled by the press. but the elections showed once more the extant fracture within Fiumani politics. The Lega renounced to nominate its candidates and Zanella was easily elected as the new mayor.

Although Zanella showed a clear will to compromise with the Hungarians essentially in an anti Croatian fashion, the King Franz Joseph explicitly refused to accept his election as podestà of Fiume on 10 April 1914. On 18 April 1914 Francesco Gilberto Corrosacz is elected as a new podestà of Fiume. Frustration was growing, fuelled by those Fiumani who within the Giovine Fiume were already embracing irredentism, questioning the traditional strategy of fiuman politics, playing among the two great Hungarian parties.

With the Austro-Hungarian declaration of war to Serbia, most of the Fiuman industry was reorganised for military production. The port was paralysed by the war and greatly reduced its activities. The local press, now subject to war censure, came under direct supervision from the offices of the Hungarian governor (procura). Initially, in the first year of war the Monarchy was in war with Serbia while Italy was neutral. Therefore, even by admission by Italian nationalists, in Fiume the Croats and Serbs in Fiume were the most hardly pressed by the military and police authorities, not the Italians.

On 23 May 1915, Italy by declaring war to the Austro-Hungarian monarchy enters the war on Entente side. By that time many Italian immigrants in Fiume had already left the city, soon followed by Hungarian banks and commercial enterprises who moved back to Budapest. The war itself did not struck Fiume, the city reported a single aerial attack performed by an Italian Zeppelin (Città di Ferrara), that bombed the torpedo works and some port facilities. The fiumani (out of some 12–14,000 mobilised) experienced a remarkably low number of casualties – reportedly due to their massive desertion rate. The Rappresentanza formally continued to gather, but war forced many of its members to army service or to exile. The communal government had to apply the ministerial ordinances. The papers that marked the age as the Voce del Popolo of Zanella and the Novi List of Supilo ceased with their publications since both editors were now in exile.

The Rappresentanza was dissolved on 5 June 1915, with the pretentious reason of a quarrel among the councillors. Francesco Gilberto Corrosacz podestà of Fiume was removed from office. The Lega Autonoma, the party allied with the government, swiftly gained power. Their exponent Antonio Vio, at the time deputy of Fiume at the Hungarian parliament was nominated podestà. After Vio's resignation form the position of deputy of Fiume at the Hungarian parliament, Andrea Ossoinack, the old adversary of Zanella, and head of the Lega Autonoma was elected "by acclamation" on 10 October 1915 deputy of Fiume at the Hungarian parliament. For the first time, the new elected Rappresentanza had 12 Hungarian councillors imposed by the Hungarian government.

After the Italian defeat at the Battle of Caporetto, on 12 September 1917 the group of nominated Hungarians to the Rappresentanza gathered to discuss ho to put a remedy to the "injustices that the Hungarian community was suffering by the Fiuman citizens". Given the delicacy of the task, the reunion was kept secret. The group produced also a program document on how was Fiume to be reorganised after the expected victory. The report was organised according to several priority points: the first was the Language Question – Hungarian language was to become official at the municipal government since it was the language of the State. The Rappresentanza had to use also the Hungarian language and the vice president had to be a Hungarian, the number of Hungarians involved in the municipal affairs had to be augmented.

The conclusions of the report provide an interesting evaluation of the real extent of autonomy: The political position of Fiume in the Provisory was the outcome of the struggle between Italians and the Slavs for the possession of the City. It was only the municipal government of Fiume who resisted these attempts and therefore the italianità of the municipality had to be preserved in what looks as a strategic deal between the Fiumani and the Hungarians. The autonomy was only a fiction masked with the insistence on the Italian language and culture – the italianità, that was seen as the way for realising the Hungarian plans for Fiume, after the Great War.

== Sources ==
- Barcic, Erasmo. 1861. La voce di un Patriotta. Fiume.
- Batthyány, Tivadar. Relazione in merito al proprio operato durante il periodo parlamentare 1892–1896, Fiume, A Chiuzzelin, 1896.
- Batthyány, Tivadar. Discorso programma del Conte Theodoro Batthyani, candidato deputato al parlamento ungarico, tenuto nella sala del Hotel Deak il giorno 24 genn. 1892 unitovi al discorso dell’on. Dr. Michele Maylender, Fiume, Antonio Chiuzzelin, 1896.
- Batthyány, Tivadar. Relazione dell’operato del conte Theodoro Batthyani quale deputato della libera città di Fiume, Tipografia Battara, 1901.
- Giacich, Antonio Felice 1861. Bisogni e voti della città di Fiume, Fiume, E. Rezza.
- Giacich, Antonio Felice 1861. Reminiscenze storiche del municipio di Fiume dal giorno dell'occupazione dei Croati nel 1848. Fiume.
- Matcovich, Gaspare, Alla popolazione di Fiume : risposta alle parole del Conte Andrassy : relative alla S. Peter-Fiume e circa l'ultima elezione dietale / Gaspare Matcovich Trieste : [s.n.], 1869 (Tipografia C. V. Rupnick & Comp.)
- Mohovich, Emidio. 1869. Fiume negli anni 1867 e 1868, Fiume Mohovich, Ed.
