= Giovanni de Ciotta =

Hungarian politician of Italian origin (1824–1903)

Giovanni de Ciotta (24 April 1824 – 6 November 1903) was the first-born son of Lorenzo de Ciotta and Luisa de Adamich, daughter of the foremost Fiuman merchant and father of modernisation in Fiume, Andrea Lodovico de Adamich. The family de Ciotta originated from Livorno, where Giovanni served the Austrian army as an engineer. As an officer of the Austrian engineer corps, he fought in Italy in the 1848-49 campaigns and remained in the army until 1859. He arrived in Fiume in 1859 from Livorno, after having resigned from the Austrian army, reputedly for political reasons. In Fiume, initially, he lived as a landlord and commercial agent for his brother Lorenzo, who ran a trading company in Livorno, but Giovanni de Ciotta soon turned to engineering. Nevertheless, his personal life remains a mystery.

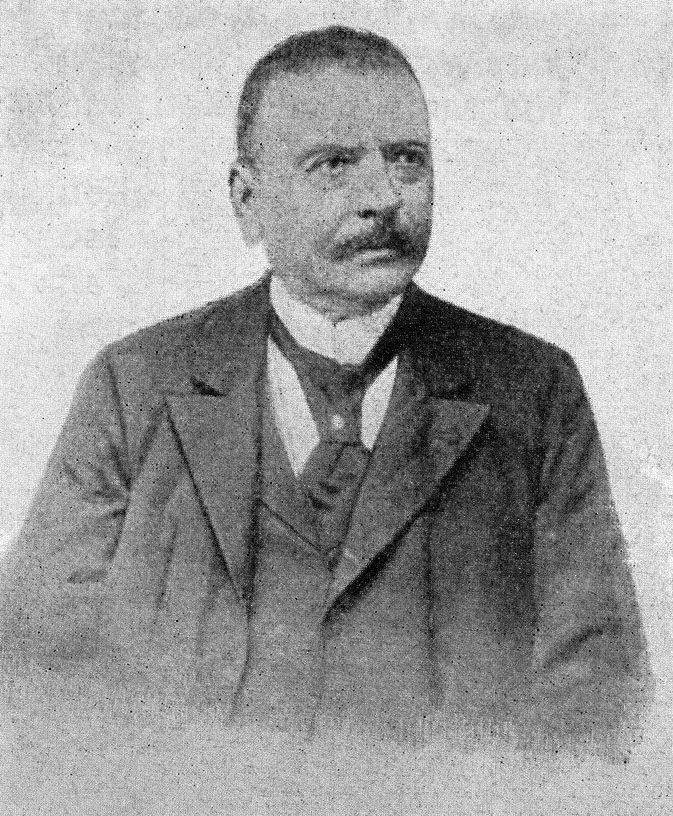
Giovanni de Ciotta

Implementing the policies of Ferenc Deák in Hungary, Giovanni de Ciotta rapidly became Deák's most influential political representative in the City. Initially, Ferenc Deák had few open supporters in Fiume, where Lajos Kossuth was preferred, given the agitation done by his local exponent Gaspare Matcovich, but a faction led by Luigi Francovich gradually emerged and coalesced around Deák's program in the 1860s.

In 1869, as a Fieuman citizen, Ciotta was elected member of Parliament in Budapest. In the same year he became the head of the Associazione politica Club Deak (a section of the Deák Circles that was to become the local branch of the Hungarian Liberal Party and as such the first modern party organization in Fiume).

Hungarian support proved to be crucial to the development of the port of Fiume and Ciotta was the key person in assuring it. From 1872 to 1896 (apart from a short interruption in 1884) he was the mayor of the city. Following the financial crisis of 1873, which culminated in 1875, the conservative-liberal Deák Party had to face a crisis from which it survived only following a merger with the more numerous conservative Left Center of Kálmán Tisza. The “new” Liberal Party of Hungary was to rule Hungary (and Fiume) from 1875 to 1890, marking the golden years of Ciotta, later known as the Idyll.

Under his leadership an impressive phase of expansion of the city began, marked by the completion of the railway from Fiume to Budapest, the construction of the modern port, and the initiation of modern industrial and commercial enterprises such as the Royal Hungarian Sea Navigation Company "Adria", and the Whitehead Torpedo Works, where his contribution was crucial as he financed Robert Whitehead's efforts in producing a viable torpedo. In 1885 the sumptuous new theatre was finished, modelled on that of Budapest and Vienna, costing him a political crisis in 1884 for the rising building costs. While on army service he met John Leard, another Fieuman of English origins. Ciotta with Leard in 1889 pushed forward the Piano regolatore a comprehensive urbanization plan for the city. The new plan laid down the plan for a modern commercial city, destroyed most of the older buildings and roads, and introduced regular planning as it was done in Budapest and other cities of the time. In 1891 the Acquedotto Ciotta was finished, providing the city with a modern sewage and water supply system. He was also a founder of several philanthropic initiatives and institutions.

The “Ciotta system” underwent a crisis in 1896 when Hungarian Prime Minister Dezső Bánffy began a centralizing policy towards Fiume. Ciotta, being unable to assure the equilibrium between Fiume and Hungary, resigned and retired to private life, following the Governor Lajos gróf Batthyány de Nemetujvár. As a response Michele Maylender, backed by Luigi Ossoinack (initiator of the Royal Hungarian Sea Navigation Company "Adria"), founded a new party, the Autonomist Association, ending the rule of the Liberal Party of Hungary in Fiume.

== Sources ==
- Ciotta, Giovanni. (J.C.) Fiume und Seine Eisenbahnfrage, Fiume Stabilimento Tipolitografico, 1864.
- Matcovich, Gaspare, Alla popolazione di Fiume : risposta alle parole del Conte Andrassy : relative alla S. Peter-Fiume e circa l'ultima elezione dietale / Gaspare Matcovich Trieste : [s.n.], 1869 (Tipografia C. V. Rupnick & Comp.)
- Mohovich, Emidio. 1869. Fiume negli anni 1867 e 1868, Fiume Mohovich, Ed.
