= Antonio Guidi (politician) =

Italian politician (born 1945)

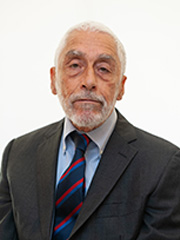

Minister of Family
- In office 11 May 1994 – 17 January 1995
- Prime Minister: Silvio Berlusconi
- Preceded by: Fernanda Contri
- Succeeded by: Adriano Ossicini

Member of the Senate
- Incumbent
- Assumed office 13 October 2022
- Constituency: Umbria

Member of the Chamber of Deputies
- In office 15 April 1994 – 29 May 2001
- Constituency: Marche (1996-1996); Apulia (1996-2001)

Personal details
- Born: 13 June 1945 (age 81) Rome, Italy
- Party: Brothers of Italy (since 2014)
- Other political affiliations: PSI (1976-1989); Forza Italia (1994-2009); PdL (2009-2012); PSI (2012-2014)
- Education: Sapienza University of Rome
- Profession: Physician; academic

Antonio Guidi (born 13 June 1945) is an Italian physician and politician. He was appointed as the first minister of family when the body was established. He was in office from May 1994 to January 1995.

== Biography ==
Guidi was born in Rome on 13 June 1945. Due to the prolonged birth duration he experienced severe asphyxiation which caused him having spastic tetraparesis. He obtained a bachelor's degree in medicine and surgery from Sapienza University of Rome. He is a specialist of the fields neurology and child neuropsychiatry. He taught at his alma mater for three years. In 1989 he worked as the regional editor of the newspaper Il Corriere Adriatico in Ancona. From 1989 to 1993 he headed the Department of Persons with Disabilities of the General Confederation of Labour.

Guidi's political career began in 1994 when he was named minister of family to the first cabinet of Prime Minister Silvio Berlusconi. He served as the undersecretary of health in the second Berlusconi cabinet. During the XII and XIII legislatures he was a deputy from Forza Italia at Chamber of Deputies.

Guidi is a member of Forza Italia since 1994. He was part of a policy group which developed policies for disadvantaged people in Rome during the mayorship of Gianni Alemanno from which he resigned in 2012.

Guidi is married and has three children.
