= Temple of Asclepius, Rome =

Ancient building in Rome, Italy

Temple of Asclepius
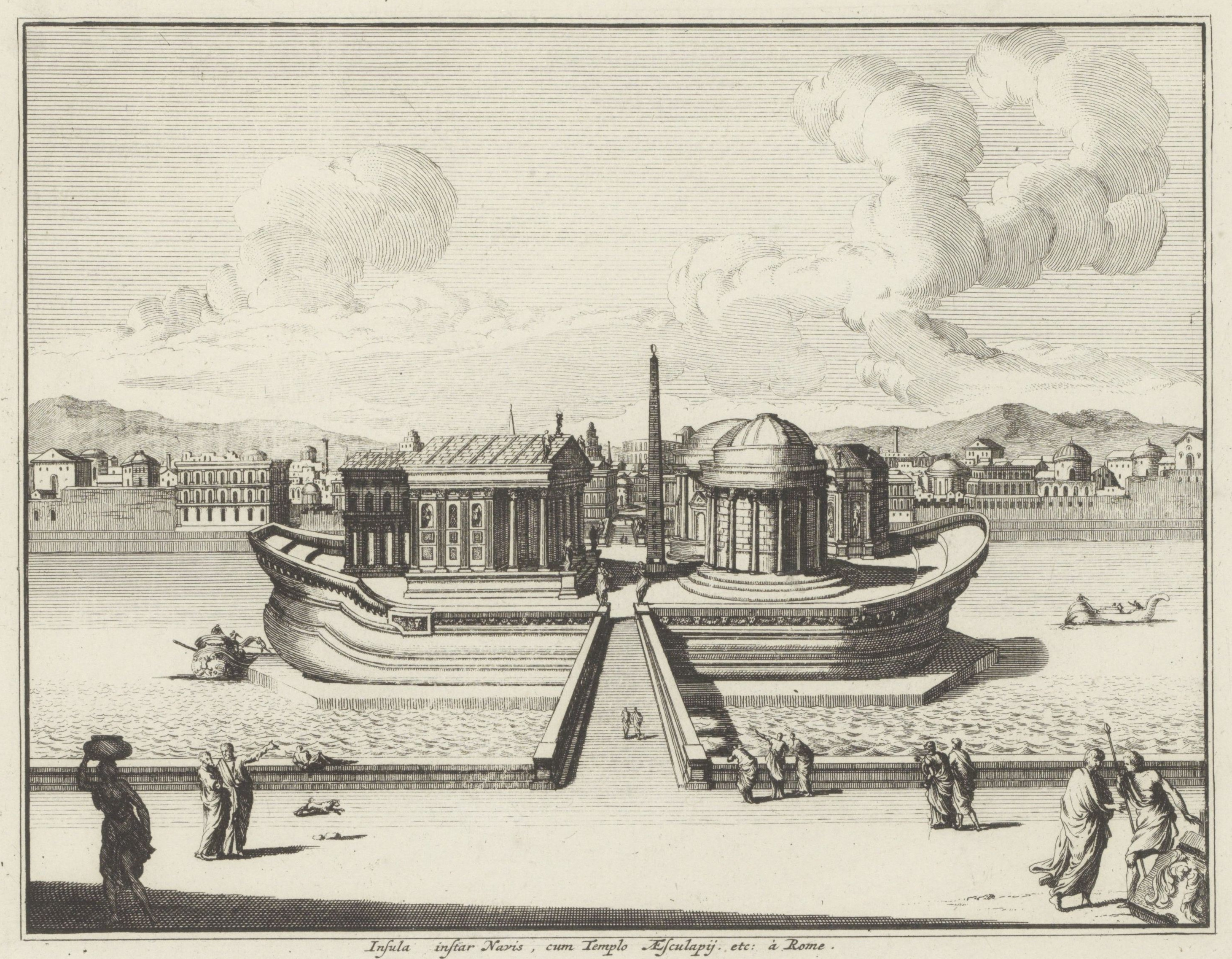
- Illustration of the Tiber Island during ancient Roman period, which depicted the Temple of Asclepius

- Shown in ancient Rome
- Interactive map of Temple of Asclepius
- 41°53′24″N 12°28′44″E

The Temple of Asclepius was an ancient Roman temple to Asclepius, the Greek god of medicine, on the Tiber Island in Rome.

== History ==
It was first built between 293 and 290 BC and was dedicated in 289 BC. According to legend, a plague hit Rome in 293 BC, leading the senate to build a temple to Asclepius, Latinised to 'Esculapius'. After having consulted the Sibylline Books and gained a favourable response, a delegation of Roman elders was sent to Epidaurus in Greece, famous for its sanctuary to Asclepius, to obtain a statue of him to bring back to Rome.

The legend also relates that during the propitiatory rites a large serpent (one of the god's attributes) slithered from the sanctuary and hid in the Roman ship. Certain that this was a sign of the god's favour, the Roman delegation quickly returned home, where the plague was still raging. As they were on the river Tiber and about to reach Rome, the snake crawled out of the ship and disappeared from sight on the island, marking the site where the temple was to be built. Work on the temple began immediately and it was dedicated in 289 BC – soon afterwards, the plague ended.

In memory of the event, the front of the island was also remodelled to imitate a trireme. An obelisk marked the island's centre, in front of the temple, to resemble a mast, while blocks of travertine were placed along the edges to look like a bow and stern. Several other structures arose on the island to shelter the sick, as evidenced by several surviving votives and inscriptions.

== Remains ==
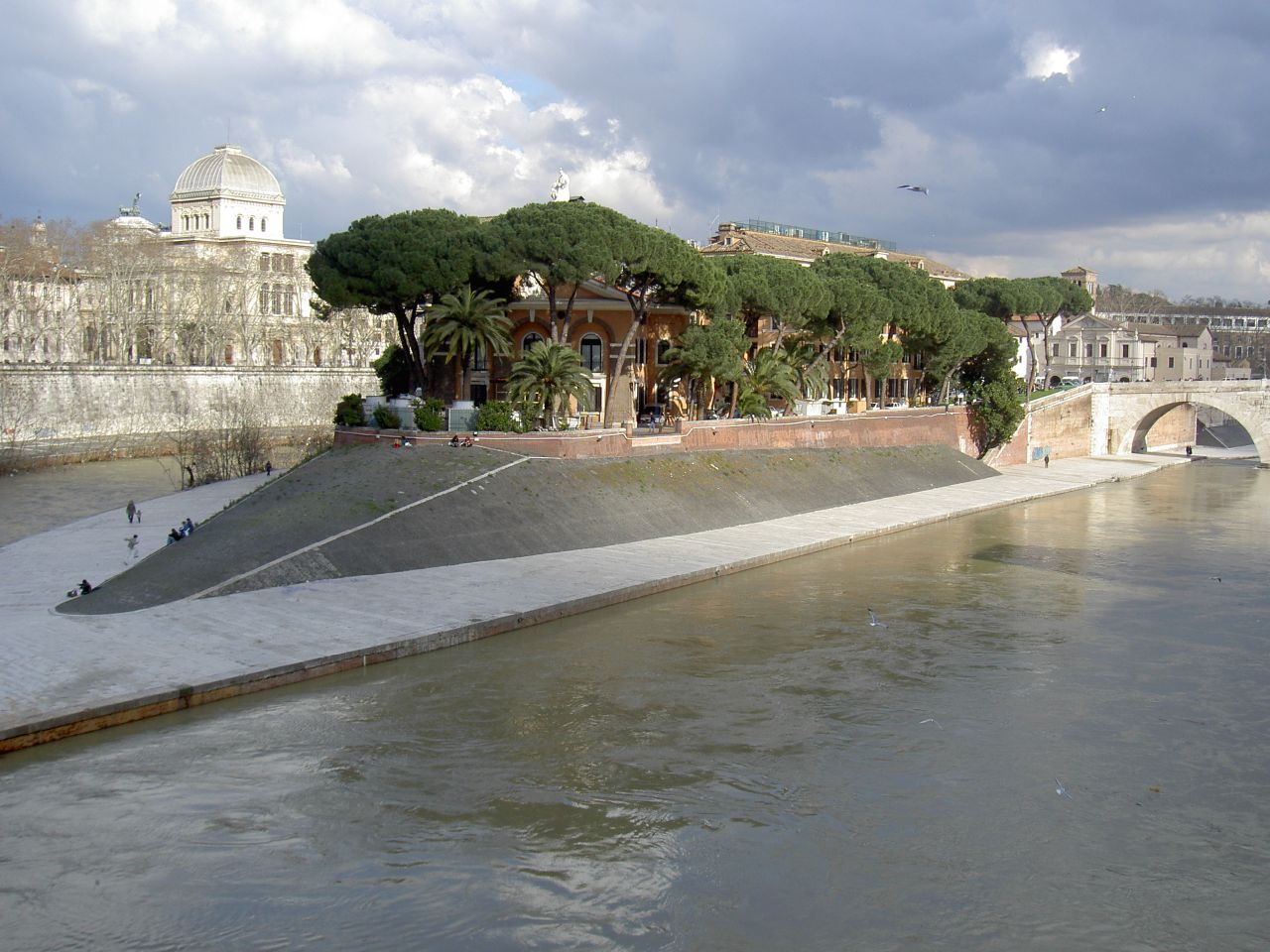
The island with the hospital, showing its similarity to a trireme. In the background is the basilica of San Bartolomeo.

The temple was destroyed in the medieval period and as early as 1000 the basilica of San Bartolomeo all'Isola was built on its remains by Otto III. The medieval well near the altar of the church seems to be the same as that used to draw water for the sick in the classical period as mentioned by Sextus Pompeius Festus, a 2nd-century Latin grammarian. There is also the Fatebenefratelli Hospital in front of the basilica.

Little remains of the temple – some fragments of the obelisk are now held in Naples and Munich and some travertine blocks were re-used in modern buildings on the island, including a relief of the staff of Asclepius.

== Bibliography ==
- Giovanni Battista Piranesi. Le antichità Romane. Roma, 1784. Volume 4. Plates XIV-XV.
- Livy. Ab Urbe Condita, 10.47.6-7
