= Party of the Christian Left =

Defunct political party in Italy

Party of the Christian Left Partito della Sinistra Cristiana
- Secretary: Franco Rodano
- Founded: 1939
- Dissolved: 1945
- Merged into: Italian Communist Party
- Newspaper: Voce Operaia; Il Pugno Chiuso
- Ideology: Christian communism Christian socialism Christian left
- Political position: Left-wing

The Party of the Christian Left (Italian: Partito della Sinistra Cristiana) was a political party in Italy founded in 1939 by Franco Rodano and Adriano Ossicini.

== History ==
The pro-Marxist Catholics initially organized themselves into a group composed not only by Rodano, but also by Ossicini, Marisa Cinciari, the sisters Laura and Silvia Garroni, Romualdo Chiesa, Mario Leporatti and Tonino Tatò. In the spring of 1941, Franco Rodano, Don Paolo Pecoraro and Adriano Ossicini elaborated the "Manifesto of the Cooperative Movement", in which the need for an immediate commitment of Catholics against fascism was supported, trying to reconcile the concepts of property and freedom with those of a humanitarian socialism. After that, the group formed itself into the Synarchical Cooperative Party (Partito Cooperativista Sinarchico) and began to collaborate clandestinely and from outside with the Italian Communist Party (PCI). In 1941, the PCS became the Christian Communist Party (Partito Comunista Cristiano).

On 9 September 1944, it became Party of the Christian Left, with the confluence of the Christian-social movement of Gabriele De Rosa but, between January and May 1945, L'Osservatore Romano reaffirmed that only the DC had the right to represent the Christians in politics.

== Books ==
- Gerd-Rainer Horn, Emmanuel Gerard, Left Catholicism, 1943-1955: Catholics and Society in Western Europe at the Point of Liberation, Leuven University Press, 2001
- Carlo Felice Casula, Cattolici comunisti e sinistra cristiana 1938-1945, Il Mulino, Bologna, 1976
- Francesco Malgeri, La sinistra cristiana (1937-1945), Morcelliana, Brescia 1982
- Augusto Del Noce, Il cattolico comunista, Rusconi, Milan, 1981
- Rosanna M. Giammanco, The Catholic-Communist Dialogue in Italy: 1944 to the Present, Praeger, New York, 1989
- David Kertzer, Comrades and Christians: Religion and Political Struggle in Communist Italy, Cambridge University Press, New York, 1980
