= Minister for Family =

Ministry in the Cabinet of Italy

Minister for Family, Natality and Equal Opportunities
- Ministro per la Famiglia, la Natalità e le Pari Opportunità
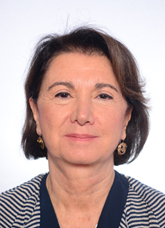
- Incumbent; Eugenia Roccella since October 22, 2022
- Department for Family Policies
- Member of: Council of Ministers
- Seat: Rome
- Appointer: The president of Italy
- Term length: No fixed term
- Formation: May 10, 1994; 32 years ago
- First holder: Antonio Guidi
- Website: www.famiglia.governo.it

The minister for family, natality and equal opportunities (Italian: ministro per la famiglia, la natalità e le pari opportunità) in Italy is one of the positions in the Italian government.

The current minister for family is Eugenia Roccella, appointed on 22 October 2022 in the Meloni Cabinet.

== List of ministers ==
Parties

- Forza Italia
- Democratic Party
- League
- Italia Viva
- Brothers of Italy
- Independent

Governments

- Centre-right coalition
- Centre-left coalition
- Mixed coalition

Portrait	Name (Born–Died)	Term of office			Party	Government	Ref.
Portrait	Name (Born–Died)	Took office	Left office	Time in office	Party	Government	Ref.
Minister for Family and Social Solidarity
	Antonio Guidi (1945–)	10 May 1994	17 January 1995	252 days	Forza Italia	Berlusconi I	
	Adriano Ossicini (1920–2019)	17 January 1995	17 May 1996	1 year, 121 days	Independent	Dini	
Office not in use		1996–2006				Prodi I D'Alema I·II; Amato II	
Office not in use		1996–2006				Berlusconi II·III	
Minister for Family Policies
	Rosy Bindi (1951–)	17 May 2006	8 May 2008	1 year, 357 days	The Daisy / Democratic Party	Prodi II	
Office not in use		2008–2018				Berlusconi IV	
Office not in use		2008–2018				Monti; Letta	
Office not in use		2008–2018				Renzi; Gentiloni	
Minister for Family and Disability
	Lorenzo Fontana (1980–)	1 June 2018	10 July 2019	1 year, 39 days	League	Conte I	
	Alessandra Locatelli (1976–)	10 July 2019	5 September 2019	57 days	League	Conte I	
Minister for Family and Equal Opportunities
	Elena Bonetti (1974–)	5 September 2019	14 January 2021	1 year, 131 days	Democratic Party / Italia Viva	Conte II	
	Giuseppe Conte (1964– ) As Prime Minister	14 January 2021	13 February 2021	30 days	Independent	Conte II	
	Elena Bonetti (1974–)	13 February 2021	22 October 2022	1 year, 251 days	Italia Viva	Draghi	
Minister for Family, Natality and Equal Opportunities
	Eugenia Roccella (1953– )	22 October 2022	Incumbent	3 years, 320 days	Brothers of Italy	Meloni	
