= Luigi Ossoinack =

Hungarian industrialist (1849–1904)

Luigi Ossoinack (Hungarian: Lajos Ossoinack; 26 June 1849 – 29 October 1904). Born in Fiume, studied in Ljubljana, Graz and Vienna, where he graduated at the commercial academy. He practised trade in Trieste, Odessa, London and North America.

In 1873 he came back to Fiume, where he started his own maritime agency. His businesses expand uninterruptedly: in 1877 he opens the first regular line between Fiume and Liverpool, and had direct influence on the institution of the Royal Hungarian Sea Navigation Company "Adria",(1881). On his initiative the Magazzini Generali were opened in (1878), and he engaged also in industrial activities with the Rice mill in (1881), and an Oak Wine Barrels plant at Mlaka (1888), and the steam shipping company "Oriente" (1891), for trade with Asia. Luigi Ossoinack participated also in the first Hungarian oil refinery, established in Fiume in 1882, and was a company board member.

Luigi Ossoinack had a decisive influence on the political life in Fiume, being the principal financial supporter of the fiuman Autonomist Party. Both Autonomist Party leaders Michele Maylender and Riccardo Zanella were actually his employees.

In 1904, for unknown reasons, he committed suicide, leaving a vacuum in the political and economic life of the city, that was never healed again. His son Andrea Ossoinack, last deputy from Fiume at the Hungarian parliament, claimed for his city the right of national self-determination, at the end of World War I.
