= Alfredo Rocco =

Italian politician and jurist

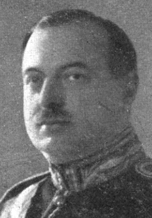

President of the Chamber of Deputies
- In office 24 May 1924 – 5 January 1925
- Preceded by: Enrico De Nicola
- Succeeded by: Antonio Casertano

Minister of Justice and Worship Affairs
- In office 5 January 1925 – 20 July 1932
- Prime Minister: Benito Mussolini
- Preceded by: Aldo Oviglio
- Succeeded by: Pietro De Francisci

Member of the Senate of the Kingdom
- In office 4 May 1934 – 28 August 1935
- Appointed by: Victor Emmanuel III

Member of the Chamber of Deputies
- In office 11 June 1921 – 19 January 1934
- Constituency: Rome (1921–24); Lazio (1924–29); Italy at-large (1929–34)

Personal details
- Born: 9 September 1875 Naples, Italy
- Died: 28 August 1935 (aged 59) Rome, Italy
- Party: Radical Party (until 1910); Italian Nationalist Association (1910–1923); National Fascist Party (1923–1935)

Alfredo Rocco (9 September 1875 – 28 August 1935) was an Italian politician and jurist. He was Professor of Commercial Law at the University of Urbino (1899–1902) and in Macerata (1902–1905), then Professor of Civil Procedure in Parma, of Business Law in Padua, and later of Economic Legislation at La Sapienza University of Rome, of which he was rector from 1932 to 1935.

Rocco, as an economics-minded politician, developed the early concept of the economic and political theory of corporatism, which later became part of the ideology of the National Fascist Party.

== Career ==
Rocco began his political career as a nationalist in the Radical Party, but eventually turned to the "proletarian nationalism" of the Italian Nationalist Association (ANI), a political party on which he had major influence. Rocco was critical of Italy's weak material and economic power, which he said was responsible for Italian dependence on the European "plutocracies" of France, Germany, and the United Kingdom. Rocco also denounced the European powers for imposing foreign culture on Italy and criticized them for their endorsement of individualism. In 1920 he became director of the newspaper L'Idea nazionale, official organ of the Nationalist Association. He developed a very close relationship with the Perrone brothers, owners of the Ansaldo company, who provided him with lavish financing. However, he had to hand over the ownership of the newspaper in 1922, when the company went bankrupt and the financing was interrupted.

He later joined the National Fascist Party, after they had merged with the Italian Nationalist Association. In a 1925 speech Rocco interpreted the ideology of fascism as the means by which the individual is sacrificed for the good of society, declaring: "For Liberalism, the individual is the end and society the means. For Fascism, society is the end, individuals the means, and its whole life consists in using individuals as instruments for its social ends."

He was elected in 1921 to the Chamber of Deputies, and became its president in 1924. From 1925 to 1932 he was Minister of Justice and promoted the criminal codification, by signing in 1930 the Criminal Code and the Code of Criminal Procedure (with the help of lawyer Vincenzo Manzini), and reconciling the Classical and Positivist schools with the system of so-called "double track". From 1925 to 1935, Rocco was the Italian representative on the International Committee on Intellectual Cooperation of the League of Nations.

Albert Einstein wrote a letter to the minister, listed in the collection The World as I See It (Mein Weltbild) in which he argued that it was not necessary for Italian scientists to swear allegiance to the Fascist party to continue their educational and scientific activities. In 1935 Rocco was awarded the Mussolini prize by the Royal Academy of Italy.

Appointed senator of the Kingdom in 1934, he died in Rome in 1935.

Among his students there was the civilist Giuseppe Ferri, author of a Handbook of Commercial Law.

In the Florestano Vancini's film The Assassination of Matteotti (1973), Rocco is played by Antonio La Raina.

== Works ==
- Che cosa è il nazionalismo e cosa vogliono i nazionalisti (1914) ("What Is Nationalism and What Do Nationalists Want?" In English translation: Sunny Lou Publishing, ISBN 978-1-95539-282-2, 2025)
- La dottrina del Fascismo e il suo posto nella storia del pensiero politico (1925)
- La trasformazione dello Stato. Dallo Stato Literale allo Stato Fascista (1927)
- La Lotta Contro La Reazione Antinazionalista (1919-1924), in Scritti e discorsi politici (1938)

== Quotes ==
"To occupy and preoccupy ourselves with the incessant struggle that the Italian nation must wage in the world, with its own forces, in order to safeguard the interests of the Italian race, is to practice nationalism."

Political offices
Preceded by Enrico De Nicola	President of the Italian Chamber of Deputies; 1924–1925	Succeeded by Antonio Casertano
Preceded by Aldo Oviglio	Italian Minister of Justice; 1925–1932	Succeeded by Pietro De Francisci
