= Gaspare Matcovich =

Hungarian politician (1797–1881)

Gaspare Matcovich (1797 in Fiume – 1881), local leader of the Kossuthists in Fiume. Emarginated after 1867 the Deákist faction of Giovanni de Ciotta become dominant in Fiume. The clash between Liberalism and radicalism in Hungary continued in Fiume, since the Kossuthists survived with Antonio Walluschnig, and later Riccardo Zanella.

Allegedly, he spent periods in England and Cuba, being involved with slave trade in the 1820s. Later, in 1820 he was employed at the Hanse bank in Trieste. He arrived in Fiume in 1823 as agent of Spiridione Gopcevich (1815 - 1861), powerful Serb merchant and ship owner. In 1823 Fiume was returned to Hungary and the prospects were growing. In 1827 Matcovich managed to sell the paper mill previously owned by A L Adamich to Walter Grafton Smith and Carl Meynier, that was to become a major fiuman industrial enterprise. In 1844 he became the director of the Società della strada ferrata Vukovar-Fiume, the first railway society that had the plan of connecting Fiume with the Pannonian Plain, and was sponsored by Lajos Kossuth.
