= Antonio Casertano =

Italian politician

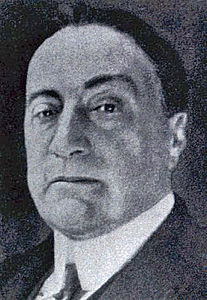

President of the Italian Chamber of Deputies
- In office 13 January 1925 – 21 January 1929
- Preceded by: Alfredo Rocco
- Succeeded by: Giovanni Giuriati

Personal details
- Born: 20 December 1863 Capua, Italy
- Died: 13 December 1938 (aged 74) Naples, Italy
- Party: Social Democracy, National Fascist Party

Antonio Casertano (20 December 1863 – 13 December 1938) was an Italian politician. He was born in Capua.

He was President of the Italian Chamber of Deputies from 1925 to 1929. After his tenure as speaker of the lower chamber, he was named senator by King Vittorio Emanuele III.

Political offices
Preceded by Alfredo Rocco	President of the Italian Chamber of Deputies; 1925–1929	Succeeded by Giovanni Giuriati
