= Andrija Ljudevit Adamić =

Croatian businessman (1766–1828)

- Born: 29 November 1766; City of Fiume, Habsburg monarchy, (now Rijeka, Croatia)
- Died: 31 October 1828 (aged 61); City of Fiume, Austrian Empire

Andrija Ljudevit Adamić (Italian: Andrea Lodovico Adamich; 29 November 1766 – 31 October 1828) was a Croatian trader from the City of Fiume (Croatian: Rijeka), builder, supporter of economical and cultural development.

Adamich was born into a wealthy Jewish family of Simon Adamić, tobacco merchant and large estates owner. Adamich was the founder and owner of many factories and manufacturers (paper, liquor, rope, etc.), and a shipowner.

He co-founded the Fiume-based firm Simone Adamich e Figlio ('Simone Adamich & Son') with his father in 1786 and worked there until 1800.

As the building chancellor of the Fiume Gubernium in 1790, he tried to transform Fiume into a modern city. His works on the plan of urbanism are also noted. In 1805 he financed and built a theatre with a capacity of 1,600 people, which was subsequently razed.

After the Napoleonic Wars, Fiume harbour was blocked, and the city was upon the brink of starvation when the English and French navies left. Adamich managed to revive the city's economy, and allowed it to prosper and evolve fully in the age of Industrial Revolution.

He represented Fiume at the Congress of Verona in 1822 and the Bratislava Assembly in 1824-25.

Adamich was a visionary, and a great man in history of Fiume. He spoke 6 languages, and had a vast influence in political and merchant circles.

== Sources ==
- Časopis za ekonomsku povijest Jugoslavije (1982)
- Kobler, Giovanni Memorie per la storia della liburnica città di Fiume (1896)

== Bibliography ==
- Dubrović, Ervin (2005). Adamićevo doba 1780 - 1830. Rijeka: Muzej grada Rijeke. ISBN 953-6587-28-9.
