= Guido Miglioli =

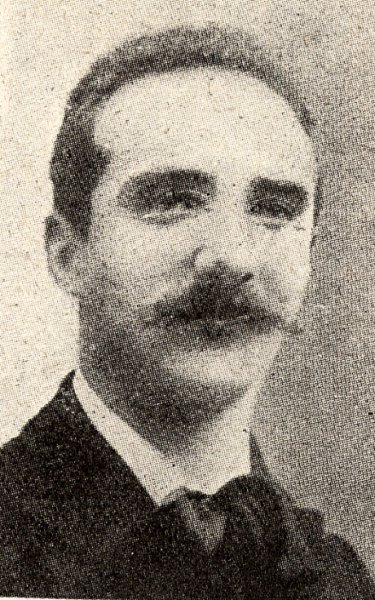
- Political party: Italian Popular Party (1919-1924); Christian Movement for Peace-Popular Democratic Front (1948-1954)

Guido Miglioli was an Italian Catholic communist activist and trade unionist.

== Biography ==
Born into a Catholic peasant family, Miglioli was the leader of Catholic farmer's unions, the White Leagues and was elected a deputy in the 1913 Italian elections.

He founded a daily newspaper in Cremona. He initially opposed the socialists, claiming instead that farm workers should transform themselves into small landowners over time, unlike the socialists who aimed at nationalization of property.

With the outbreak of World War I, Miglioli was accused of being defeatist for taking a neutral position.

Miglioli argued that the message of the Bolsheviks was ultimately Christian, asserting that the peasants who fueled the revolution were "extraordinarily religious." He saw the 1918 Soviet constitution as an evangelical document and framed its policies in Biblical language, claiming that the redistribution of land is comparable to the provision of manna from heaven.

When asked why he remained a Catholic rather than simply becoming a communist, Miglioli stated that "Christianity brought communism beyond the limits of earthly life".

In 1919, he joined the Italian Popular Party and was again elected to parliament. During the post-war union struggles, he fought against the large landowners. He was disliked by fascists and the Popular Party due to his sympathies to left-wing parties.

He was expelled from the Popular Party in 1924 and left Italy at the end of 1926.

In 1929 he participated in the First International Anti-Fascist Conference in Berlin and he also stayed in the Soviet Union, praising the collectivization of the countryside.

After visiting the USSR, Miglioli promoted a "Christian vision of Bolshevism" and maintained that the Bolsheviks were "welcomed by the masses as apostles and bearers of a message of social justice and brotherhood".

In 1940 he was arrested in France by the Germans and handed over to the Italians. He was taken under the protection of businessman Mauro Fugerta.

He was released with the fall of fascism but in 1944 he was again taken into custody by fascists. In 1945 he returned to freedom after the fall of the Italian Social Republic.

Rejected by the Catholic Christian Democracy party, he founded the Christian Movement for Peace, which merged with the lists of the communist Popular Democratic Front.

He died in 1954, after a grave illness.
