= Roberto Lordi =

Brigadier General in the Royal Italian Air Force (1894–1944)

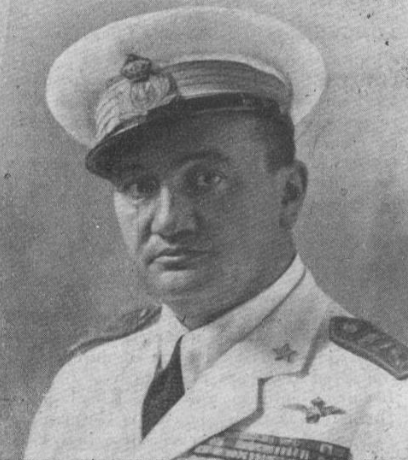
Roberto Lordi

Roberto Lordi (Naples, 11 April 1894 – Rome, 24 March 1944) was Brigadier General of the Regia Aeronautica, Gold Medal of Military Valour Recipient and Martyr in the Fosse Ardeatine Massacre.

== Biography ==
The son of Gregorio and Rosina D’Antona, Roberto Lordi was born in Naples on 11 April 1894. He attended the “Nunziatella” Military College and fought in the First World War as a Mountain Artillery Officer. Appointed Lieutenant, and obtaining his Flying Observer’s licence at the end of 1916, he displayed great bravery in the battle of Brenta. After obtaining his Pilot’s licence in 1918, he distinguished himself in the Piave and Isonzo battles. He was awarded the Silver Medal for Military Valour and the Italian croix de guerre for gallantry in his daring reconnaissance missions. After earning a degree in Aeronautical Engineering at the Turin Polytechnic, in 1919 he was stationed in Libya at the Comando Aviazione della Tripolitania as the Commanding Officer of the 89th Bomber Squadron.

In 1920 he flew in the Roma-Athens Air Race and in 1925 he took part in the Turin-Tunis-Tripoli Air Race. Promoted to Captain in the newborn Regia Aeronautica, he was assigned in 1924 to the XIII Stormo Aeroplani da bombardamento (13th Bombardment Wing, known as “the Iron Wing”), becoming its Commanding Officer. In 1927 he organized, and took part in, the first mass parachute drop in Cinisello Balsamo. The following year he flew a Fiat R.22 for the Rome-Turin-London Air Race, ranking among the top pilots along with his very close friend Sabato Martelli Castaldi.

As Officer in Command of the Aviazione della Cirenaica at the beginning of 1929, he was advanced to the rank of Colonel on 17 July 1931, for merit rather than seniority. During those years he was awarded two more Italian croix de guerre and a Silver Medal for Aeronautical Valour. On 23 June 1931, a world’s first, he flew a Ro.1 over the Libyan spurs of the Tibesti mountains, along with another aircrew under Italo Balbo’s command. In those days he led many a desert flight and worked on technical improvements to the aircraft used by the units under his command. In October 1932 he was appointed to overview the operations on the Libyan southern borders, at Uweinat and Maaten Sarra. While monitoring and anticipating the moves of the British expedition led by Ralph Bagnold, on 17 October 1932 he made a daring flight over the lakes of Unianga Kebir and Unianga Serir, in French-controlled territory between the Tibesti massif and the Ennedi plateau in Chad. In the following month of November, he set up and coordinated the outstanding secret reconnaissance mission looking for the oasis of Zerzura.

=== Military Mission to China ===
In September 1933, following important political agreements made personally by Galeazzo Ciano (Mussolini’s son-in-law, Minister Plenipotentiary in Shanghai until 1933 and at the time Minister of Press and Propaganda), Lordi was sent to China as Commander of the Italian Military Mission. Thanks to his deep aeronautical knowledge and to his loyalty, he won the trust of Generalissimo Chiang Kai-shek and became his personal advisor. Appointed Chief of Staff of the Chinese Air Force on 18 May 1934, with the duty of reorganizing the whole aeronautical apparatus and managing its budget, he succeeded in undermining the American and German competition by obtaining from H. Kung, Chinese Minister of Finances, an agreement to build an Italian aircraft construction plant in Nanchang. Promoted to the rank of Brigadier General in March 1935, he was able to obtain valuable orders for aircraft and arms that were badly managed by the Italian regime and the manufacturing companies. A clash with the Italian Ambassador to China and the Aeronautical Attaché developed, and he consequently opposed the sale of Italian goods to the Chinese government. On 20 April 1935, he addressed to the Italian Head of Government a telegram in which he reported greed and incompetence on the part of government officials and commercial company representatives. This uncompromisingly critical report, envy for the brilliant achievements of the mission to China under his command, and his then deeply changed views on Fascism evolving since the time of his command in Cyrenaica, drew hostility from both the political and military upper echelons. Recalled back to Italy at the end of August 1935, with the excuse of having to report on the mission, Roberto Lordi was first arrested and then locked up in a nursing home. He was accused of false and specious embezzlement of funds and forcefully put into retirement for reaching the age limit, though he was only 42. He made useless but extremely brave appeals to the State Council in 1937 and 1938, against the Ministry of Aeronautics, for abuse of power. Both were rejected in 1939. He was put under constant surveillance by OVRA (“Opera Vigilanza Repressione Antifascismo”, the Agency for the Surveillance and Repression of Anti-fascism) until 1942 and was confined in his Genzano di Roma home, with the full prohibition of leaving Italy and having any relationship with the Chinese Government. Persistent official requests were made by Chiang Kai-shek to Mussolini, to have Roberto Lordi back at his side, to no avail. Having become a political issue also on the grounds of the gradual approach of the fascist regime towards Japan, Lordi was never to return to China.

General Silvio Scaroni succeeded Lordi as the head of the Mission but he had to face the dissatisfaction of Shanghai's international community about Lordi's dismissal.

=== Resistance During World War II ===
He remained without employment until 1939 when, together with his friend Sabato Martelli Castaldi – who had himself been put to forced retirement by the fascist regime for strong disagreements – he was employed by Count Ernesto Stacchini as Director of the Stacchini powder mill in Via Cavour in Rome. Following the Armistice on 8 September 1943, though suffering from heart disease, he exited his house with his hunting rifle to reach Porta San Paolo and fight against the German troops. He cooperated with both the Fronte Militare Clandestino (Clandestine Military Front) and the Comitato di Liberazione Nazionale (National Liberation Committee), resupplying with arms and ammunition several groups of partisans from the Lazio and Abruzzi regions. With his friend Sabato he set up the “Fulvi” partisan band, made up of more than 500 men, that was active in the Castelli romani area. In his country home in Genzano, he helped and hid people wanted by the Nazi occupation forces for political and military reasons, including Jews. He kept in contact with Allied troops thanks to radio equipment he himself set up, forwarding important information on topographical features and German military installations between Fregene and Anzio. He also personally took part in risky sabotage missions together, as always, with Martelli Castaldi.

After an informer denounced them, on 17 January 1944 the Nazi SS broke into the homes of Lordi and Martelli Castaldi without finding them, for they were not in Rome: Stacchini was arrested in their stead. The following day Lordi and Martelli Castaldi voluntarily appeared before the German Embassy, asking for the release of Stacchini. They were both arrested and locked up in the Via Tasso prison. During the 67 days in Cell no. 4 of the dreaded prison in Via Tasso, Lordi was well aware of the torture always awaiting him, and so he feigned illness, in order to request a visit from his personal doctor, a cardiologist. Professor Giovanni Borromeo was a member of the Resistance, and one of Lordi’s clandestine radios was hidden in the cellars of the Fatebenefratelli Hospital, where Borromeo worked. Lordi’s fear was that he would give in to the Nazi tortures, so he asked Borromeo to learn by heart a list of names of others involved in the partisan struggle. He wanted them to be warned and get to safety if perchance they were unaware of his arrest and the risks they ran. There is no evidence of Borromeo's visit to Lordi nor of Lordi's relation to the Fatebenefratelli. It seems unlikely that the Germans and the Fascist police would let a doctor witness what was happening inside the jail of Via Tasso.

After 67 days of captivity and torture, on 24 March 1944 Lordi and Martelli Castaldi were among those slaughtered at the Ardeatine Caves outside Rome. Herbert Kappler, the German Officer who perpetrated the massacre, stated during the trial against him in 1948 that both died shouting “Viva l’Italia” (“Long live Italy!”).

Lordi stands out for the high sense of honour and loyalty always shown to his country, a lasting example of the virtues of heroism, coherence and courage which have historically distinguished the best airmen in the Italian Air Force. Nothing in this sense can be added to the biography by Emanuela Massa Lordi,[5] who on Lordi’s devotion to the ideal of Country writes: “My father-in-law risked his life, his family and his possessions for something he felt was his precise duty. Looking through these old papers, yellowed with time, I had the proof again that I was the daughter-in-law of an extraordinary man”.

Decorations

Gold Medal for Military Valour; posthumous

Dedicating himself with no personal ambitions and for purest love of his country to partisan activity, during the four months of his tireless and most risky work he gave generously all his exceptional qualities of courage, intelligence and organizing capacity, finding men and supplies for the armed groups, subtracting arms and explosives destined for the Germans, furnishing the Allied Command with useful information, all with a very serious personal risk. Arrested and lengthily tortured, he revealed nothing of his collaborators and faced death serenely. A most noble example of a complete and disinterested dedication to the cause of freedom for his own country.

Ardeatine Caves, 24 March 1944 – Legislative Decree, 15 February 1945.

[1] He did everything possible to save the Jews from the Roman ghetto from being deported and had managed to trick the Germans thanks to a fantastic expedient making them believe the Jews were suffering from the K disease, an incipient tuberculosis, which was totally make-believe. He was awarded the title of “Righteous among the Nations” by the State of Israel. See Pietro Borromeo, Il giusto che inventò il Morbo di K

[2] The doctor’s visit to the prison features in the docu-film My Italian Secret - The Forgotten Heroes, which tells of the bravery of many Italian heroes who risked their lives saving hundreds from the Nazis.

[5] Emanuela Massa Lordi, Ed or non batte più che l’ala del mio sogno.
