= Communist Party of Fiume =

- Founder: Albino Stalzer
- Founded: 1919
- Dissolved: 1923
- Preceded by: Socialist Party of Fiume
- Ideology: Communism; Marxism; Fiume Autonomism; Anti-fascism
- Political position: Far-left
- International affiliation: Comintern

The Communist Party of Fiume – Section of the Third International (Italian: Partito Comunista di Fiume – Sezione della Terza Internazionale) was instituted in November 1921, after the proclamation of the Free State of Fiume created by the Treaty of Rapallo. The Communist Party of Fiume was the smallest Communist Party in the world at the time. It was founded following the principles of the Third International, according to which each sovereign State had to have its own Communist Party organization.

== Origins ==
After 1918 the Socialist Party of Fiume, under the leadership of Samuel Maylender became the International Socialist Party of Fiume. In 1919, a local Communist Party, was founded independently (and almost single-handedly) by Albino Stalzer, by mobilising the local dockers. Stalzer and Schneider founded also a Workers’ Co-operative of the Port, whose influence proved to be much greater than that of the Communist Party itself. In 1920 both had a difficult existence during the occupation of Fiume led by the Italian poet Gabriele D'Annunzio.

Albino Stalzer however proved instrumental in providing working class support to the autonomists of Riccardo Zanella. After the autonomist victory at the elections for the Constituent Assembly on 24 April 1921, the local Fascio staged a coup d'état. In opposition, the Camera del Lavoro (controlled by the Socialists) proclaimed a general strike, but when its leaders Antonio Zamparo and G. Holly were arrested by dictator Riccardo Gigante an end of the strike was proclaimed. Thanks to the Workers’ Co-operative of the Port the strike continued motu proprio, forcing the "Exceptional Government" of "dictator" Gigante to resign and allow the entry of the Alpine troops into Fiume, as requested by the Italian plenipotentiary Carlo Caccia Dominioni.

The Workers’ Co-operative of the Port, of Stalzer, proved to be the main organised force of the opposition to Gigante, and this was the single most important action done by the leftist organisations in the Free State of Fiume. Moreover, it had clear autonomist underpinnings: what was contested was not only the fascist organisation of the putsch, but its Italian annexationist character.

The normalisation of the situation that followed the inauguration of the Zanella government in October 1921 enabled the holding of a Fiume Socialist Congress in November, where (as happened in Italy) a Communist Party was formed. The Party originated from a split within the Socialist Party in Fiume, following on from the secession of the Communist Party of Italy from the Italian Socialist Party in Livorno on 13 November 1921. On 11 November 1921, the Socialist Party of Fiume officially joined the Communist International.

The "old Socialist Party of Fiume" had to discuss the Twenty-one Conditions of Moscow, which had not been discussed at the previous congress on 22 August 1921, since a "regime of terror" then reigned in Fiume, when the party's "best comrades" were expelled and persecuted. At the Socialist meeting, old members were reintegrated into the party. Among them was Árpád Simon, a Hungarian Jew who had escaped to Fiume after the failure of the Hungarian Soviet Republic of Béla Kun and was chosen as Secretary of the Communist Party of Fiume. The Party accepted the leadership of Lenin and proclaimed him honorary president of the party. The meeting illustrated the division between two factions: the Communists and the Unitarians. The unitarians adopted Lenin's "Twenty-one Conditions", but stated their will to preserve the old name of "Socialist Party", and omitted the intention to eliminate the reformers and the centrists.

After the elections, in which the communist faction prevailed, a "mozione della frazione comunista" was passed: it implied adhesion to the Third Communist International, the adoption of the new name of "Partito Comunista di Fiume, (sezione della III internazionale Comunista)", the adoption of organization and tactics from the second Congress of the Communist International, subordination to the international direction centres, and the adhesion of local labour organisations to the Red International of Labour Unions.

The party declared its will to participate in elections, but only whilst keeping its "revolutionary purpose" of overthrowing "bourgeois democracy" well in mind.

Simon declared that the Socialist Party had ceased to exist and in its place the Communist Party of the Free State of Fiume (Partito Comunista dello Stato libero di Fiume) was constituted. The unitarian socialists were put on the defensive: although they accepted the 21 points and promised not to infringe the unity of the United Proletarian Front, given the "incommensurable difficulties" of organizing a proletarian party in a bilingual environment, the name Socialist Party had to be retained. The party issued several articles in the Lavoratore of Trieste and Lo Stato operaio of Milan, not a single one being published in the Yugoslav communist press, since the organization turned to Italy for its inspiration and guidelines. On 28 November the Executive Committee of the Communist Party of Italy sent a salutory letter to the Communist Party of the Free State of Fiume. Again, the relationship is always with Italy, the Yugoslav party is never mentioned.

The funeral of Cesare Seassaro, was the only mass meeting ever organised by the Communist Party of the Free State of Fiume, where several speakers participated. The Young Communist International was represented at the meeting by a speaker – the Italian delegate Secondino Tranquilli, later known as Ignazio Silone.

Notably, the Communist Party of Fiume had direct official relationships with the Communist Party of Italy, while the Yugoslav Communist party is never mentioned. The contacts with the Hungarian Communists were of an informal nature, but definitely important, and continued well into the 1920s. The main party cadres came from Hungary after the end of the revolution. Ella (Gabriella) Seidenfeld carried out the liaison between the Communist Party of Fiume and the Communist Party of Italy and later became the long-time companion of Ignazio Silone. In a letter sent by the Communist Party of Italy to the Communist Youth Federation of Fiume it is clear that the Communist Party of Fiume is considered by the Communist Party of Italy as a trait d'union with the Yugoslavs.

Nevertheless, as for the Fascists, for the Communist Party of the Free State of Fiume the biggest enemy was Albino Stalzer.

== Aftermath ==
The Communist Party of Fiume showed a little activity in 1922: in January, it publicly announced its creation, and at the beginning of 1922 the Statute of the Party was published (Mozione comunista and the Statuto del Partito comunista di Fiume). In the Preamble, the Party proclaimed its full adhesion to the revolutionary stances and principles of the Second International. The Party was to be organized in sections, along city districts. Each section was to elect an Executive Committee, that nominated the various commissions (evaluation of candidatures, Communist Youth etc.) The Central Committee of fifteen members was to nominate an executive committee of five members and assume the direction of the communist organ propaganda. The Congress was the sovereign manifestation of the Party. Article 54 allowed for members of the Socialist Party of Fiume to join the Communist Party of the Free State of Fiume, within one month.

After the fascist putsch that struck down the Zanella government, the secretary of the Triestine section of the Italian Communist Party, Cavaciocchi, arrived immediately in Fiume, where in an interview with the Vedetta d'Italia he implicitly expressed solidarity with the fascist action against the "bourgeois" Zanella. Cavaciocchi declared that on 3 March the city was liberated from the "tyrant", referring to Zanella.

Again; it was Stalzer who protested against the fascist violence, which he denounced in a paper titled L’Ultima ora, and later in a manifesto and some clandestine leaflets, in which he denounced the curious solidarity between the fascists and the local communists. That was his last action in Fiume, before leaving for Portorè, where he joined Zanella in exile, later living an isolated private life on the edge of misery and oblivion.

In September 1922, in a second public announcement, the Communist Party of Fiume condemned publicly the "Primo Partito comunista di Fiume" led by Albino Stalzer, with the charge that the party was close to the "bourgeois autonomist party" (solidale col partito autonomo (borghese) di Zanella) and for his solidarity with Zanella in Portorè.

On 10 October 1922, the delegates of the Communist Party of Fiume were nominated for the Fourth Congress of the Third International and the Second Congress of the Red International of Labour Unions. The secretary of the C.C. of the Communist Party of Fiume, the Hungarian Jew, Arpad Simon, was elected and proposed Stefan Popper (another Hungarian Jew) as representative of the Communist Party of Fiume at the conference. If he was to refuse, the Italian communist party delegation at the conference had the full mandate to represent the Communist Party of Fiume .

Progressively, as the fascists extended their power in the city, the activity of the Communist Party of Fiume dwindled. The press releases and reports of the party during 1923 are defensive acts written after some of the members of the Party, and even some mere sympathizers, had been attacked or arrested.

The Party’s last statements were published in the Milanese paper "Lo Stato Operaio", after the wrecking of the Il Lavoratore offices in Trieste. With the communique of the Executive committee, dated November the 1st 1923, the Milanese paper become (as it was for Italy) the official press organ for the Communist Party of Fiume.

== Dissolution ==
The last publication of the Communist Party of Fiume was a Manifesto, directed against the annexation of the City to Italy. The document, dated 9 November 1923, is the last act of the party. The slogans of this proclamation are almost entirely autonomist. Distrust of the League of Nations was openly proclaimed, it asked for protection by Soviet Russia and called for action by the international proletariat against the “imperialism of Italy and Yugoslavia”. The Manifesto had to be signed also by the Communist Party of Italy and the Nezavisna radnička partija Jugoslavije.

The answer provided by the Communist Party of Italy was very disappointing to the Communist Party of Fiume, since it deemed any action as hopeless. Nor did the Yugoslav Communist Party do anything to oppose the Treaty, as it did not oppose the annexation of Fiume to Italy. In the meanwhile, the faction of the autonomist Communists led by Stalzer went to Zanella and was widely opposed by the Communist Party of Fiume, which before its dissolution was definitely connected to the Italian Party and subordinated to its local section in Trieste, acting as its main organizational and ideological support.

== See also ==
- List of delegates of the 1st Comintern congress
- List of delegates of the 2nd Comintern congress
- List of Communist Parties
- List of members of the Comintern
