= Antonio Felice Giacich =

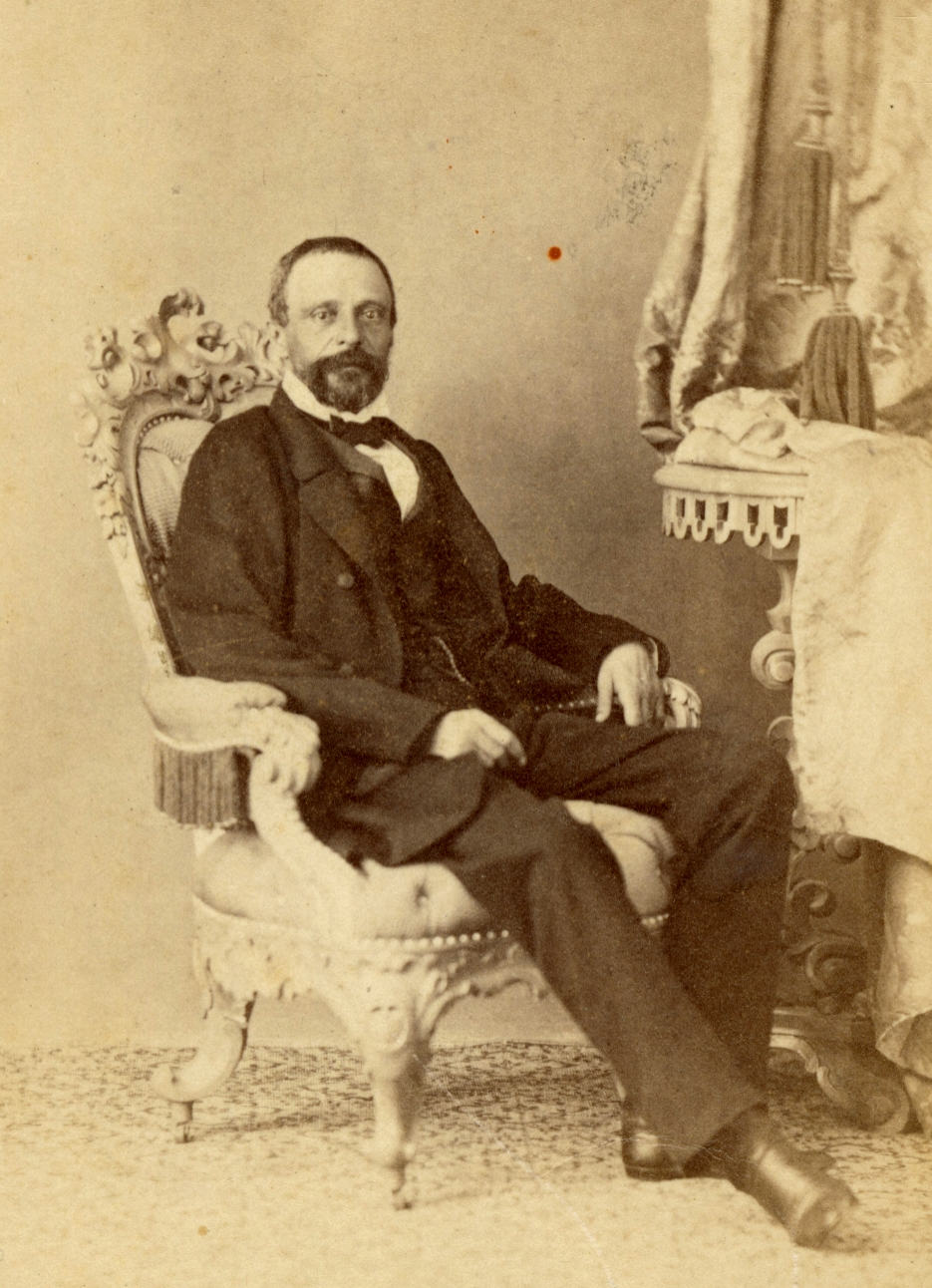

Antonio Felice Giuseppe Giacich also spelt Antun Feliks Gjačić, Đačić or Jačić (23 May 1813 – 2 May 1898) was a Croatian physician who is remembered for his work in naval medicine. He published the "Lezioni mediche per i naviganti" (Medical lessons for seafarers) in 1855 that dealt with medical issues associated with seafaring. One of his innovations was a patented system of using two balloons to resuscitate drowning victims.

== Life and work ==
Giacich was born in Lovran in a Jačić family, his father Ivan (Giovanni) Nepomuk and mother Eleonore née Segner had moved from somewhere near Montenegro who had moved into Liburnia. He studied at the royal high school in Zadar where he stayed with an older sister. In 1832 he passed the matriculation and went to study medicine in Vienna and Padua and qualified in 1838. His thesis "De acu pressore" described a specially designed needle for piercing arteries for therapeutic purposes. He then worked in Istria, Dalmatia and at the city hospital in Trieste before moving to Rijeka (or Fiume) in 1839. Here he worked at the St. Duha where he became well known and rose to become the director, serving until 1885. He wrote popular articles on medicine and specialized in ophthalmology and obstetrics. He promoted the idea of making the Optaija Riviera into a health spa destination in 1847. He also spent time on examining medical issues associated with seafarers after the 1851 congress in maritime medicine in Paris suggested that each country produce their own manual. The Habsburg Kingdom assigned the task to Giacich who also taught at the Imperial and Royal Naval Academy in Fiume. He developed a device for identifying color blindness for naval recruitment. Other contributions included his work on the use of carbolic acid for asepsis and the use of iodine for debridement prior to surgery, a technique that was used in wartime Libya in 1912. He patented a system of rubber bellows for use in artificial respiration. He also worked as a city sanitary commissioner and was involved in syphilis and cholera management. In 1912 Giacich received the Commander of the Order of the Crown of Italy and a stamp with his portrait was released in 1919. Giacich also took an interest in theatre and wrote a four-act drama La donna fatale. He is buried in Rijeka.
