= Cesare Seassaro =

Italian journalist (1891–1921)

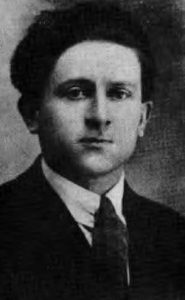
- Seassaro, likely in 1920

Personal details
- Party: Communist Party of Italy; Communist Party of Fiume
- Occupation: Journalist

Cesare Seassaro (25 March 1891 in Pavia, Italy – 15 November 1921 in Rijeka, Croatia) was a socialist journalist and publicist. In 1918, he authored Cooperazione e municipalizzazione. La personalità giuridica dell’azienda municipalizzata.

Originally from a bourgeois family, Seassaro became an active Catholic socialist after participating in the First World War. He eventually became an early member of the Communist Party of Italy. In 1919, he wrote for the weekly L'Ordine Nuovo founded by Antonio Gramsci.

Seassaro began working for the Triestine communist newspaper Il Lavoratore in September 1921, after it had restarted publication following a Fascist attack in February 1921. Seassaro wrote various articles for Il Lavoratore that fused communist theory and current events on topics such as internationalism, Fascism, and revolution. Additionally, he contributed his perspectives on the compatibility of communism and Christianity.

Seassaro traveled to Fiume in November 1921 to support the construction of the Communist Party of Fiume. He died there in his sleep of accidental gas intoxication.
