= Ospedale Isola Tiberina – Gemelli Isola =

Hospital in Rome, Italy

- Gemelli Isola – Società Benefit S.p.A.
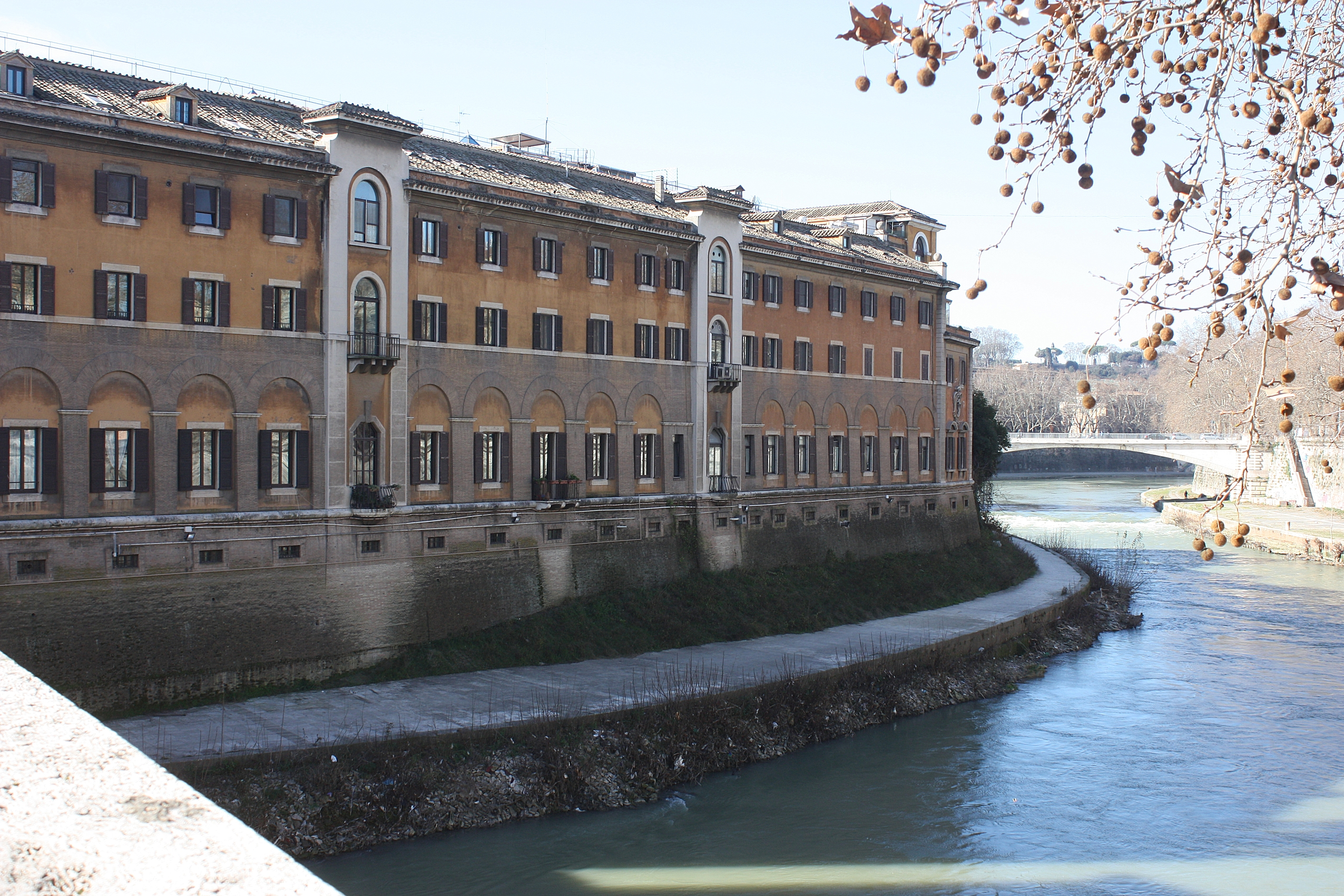
- View of the hospital on Tiber Island

Geography
- Location: 39, Via di Ponte Quattro Capi, 00186 Rome, Italy
- Coordinates: 41°53′27″N 12°28′37″E

Organisation
- Care system: Public
- Type: General

History
- Founded: 1585

Links
- Website: www.ospedaleisolatiberina.it
- Lists: Hospitals in Italy

Ospedale Isola Tiberina – Gemelli Isola is a hospital in Rome, established in 1585 and located on the Tiber Island on the site of an ancient temple dedicated to Aesculapius. Formerly operated by the Brothers Hospitallers of Saint John of God as San Giovanni Calibita Fatebenefratelli Hospital, it adopted its current name after the company Gemelli Isola – Società Benefit S.p.A. acquired it on 1 September 2022.

Throughout its history, the hospital has served as a sanctuary for marginalized and persecuted groups. During the Holocaust, it sheltered Jews from Nazi persecution by admitting them as patients and diagnosing them with a fictitious disease known as "Syndrome K".

== History ==
The origins of the hospital on the Tiber Island date to before 1000 CE, where the ancient Temple of Asclepius dedicated to the Greek god of medicine, Asclepius, and a healing clinic called a Asclepieion was replaced by a sanctuary dedicated to Bartholomew the Apostle, one of the Twelve Apostles of Jesus. The sanctuary provided aid for local populations of beggars, the poor, and the sick. During the mid-16th century, begging was banned in Rome and the shelter was converted into fabbriche della salute ("health factory").

In 1539 Saint John of God founded the religious institute, the Brothers Hospital, in Granada, Spain. The institute was recognized in 1572 by Pope Pius V and was nicknamed Fatebenefratelli, a phrase used by the saints while inviting passersby to do charity. The epithet means "You do well, brothers[, for God's sake]". In 1581, the Brothers Hospital founded a new hospital called Casa degli Orfanelli ("House of Orphans") in Piazza di Pietra, with around 20 beds. Two members of the institute, Brother Pietro Soriano and Brother Sebastiano Arias, moved to the Tiber Island. In 1585, the institute purchased a monastery with the help of Pope Gregory XIII; the monastery had previously been occupied by the Benedictine Sisters until 1573 and later by the Brotherhood of the Bolognese. The pontiff also granted them the adjoining church of St. John Calybita.

Fifteen saints settled on Tiber Island and introduced health care measures. During the 1656–57 plague outbreaks in Rome, the hospital specialized in the treatment of plague patients and formed a school to teach its staff to deal with epidemics. The hospital was recognized by the Special Commission of Health during the 1832 cholera outbreaks in Rome.

Eight years after the capture of Rome in 1870, the hospital management was dissolved in 1878. Three individuals bought the hospital for "private industry and interest". These three "mysterious" people were three friars who acted as buyers in disguise to elude the law still in force against possessing the work of religious hospitals. In 1892, the old management of the hospital was restored. During the nineteenth century, the hospital was strengthened against the floods of the Tiber River with the erection of surrounding walls. This construction was interrupted by World War I and resumed in 1922. The hospital added ophthalmology and fluoroscopy units, considered the first of their kind in Rome.

== Departments ==
The hospital has following departments:

- Cardiology
- General surgery
- CRTI
- Endocrinology
- Gastroenterology
- Medicine
- Nephrology and Dialysis
- Neurology
- Oncology
- Orthopedics
- Obstetrics and Gynecology
- Otolaryngology
- Radiotherapy
- Neonatal Intensive Care
- Urology

== Services and surgeries ==
Following are the services provided and surgeries performed at the hospital:

Surgeries

- General Surgery
- Systemic Amyloidosis Surgery
- Surgery Cholesterol and Cardiovascular Disease Prevention
- Hematology Surgery
- Medicine Surgery
- Neurological Surgery
- Ophthalmology Surgery
- Dentistry Surgery
- Orthopedic Surgery
- Otolaryngology Surgery
- Pediatric Surgery
- Skin ulcers Surgery
- Urology Surgery
- Oncology and DH Surgery
- Disability support Surgery
- Food intolerances Surgery

Services

- Acupuncture Clinic
- Allergy Clinic
- Anesthesiology Clinic
- Angiology and Sclerosing Clinic
- Cardiology Clinic
- Dermatology Clinic
- Endocrinology Clinic
- Gastroenterology and Digestive Endoscopy Clinic
- Nephrology and Dialysis Clinic
- Homeopathy Clinic
- Obstetrics and Gynecology Clinic
- Pathological anatomy
- Laboratory Analysis
- Psychology and Psychotherapy
- Radiology
- Outpatient Service of Aesthetic Medicine
- Dietary Service
- Transfusion Service

== Awards ==
On 21 June 2016, the hospital was honored as a "House of Life" by the International Raoul Wallenberg Foundation.
