= Augusto Del Noce =

Italian philosopher and political thinker (1910–1989)

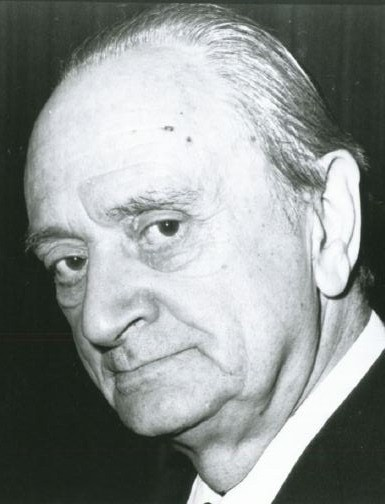
- Born: 11 August 1910; Pistoia, Italy
- Died: 30 December 1989 (aged 79); Rome, Italy

Philosophical work
- Era: 20th-century philosophy
- Region: Western philosophy
- School: Continental philosophy
- Institutions: Sapienza University of Rome

Senator of the Republic
- In office 15 February 1984 – 1 July 1987
- Preceded by: Aldo Sandulli
- Constituency: Lazio

Augusto Del Noce (11 August 1910 – 30 December 1989) was an Italian philosopher and political thinker. He is regarded as one of the preeminent political thinkers and philosophers after the Second World War in Italy.

== Life and works ==
Del Noce was born in Tuscany but he grew up and studied in Turin, which between the two World Wars was one of the main centers of secular and anti-fascist culture in Italy. He completed his degree in Philosophy in 1932 at the University of Turin, with a dissertation on Malebranche under the direction of Adolfo Faggi. Between 1934 and 1943 he published a series of essays on early modern philosophy that established his reputation as a specialist in the field, not only in Italy but also in France where his work was praised by well-known scholars such as Étienne Gilson and Henri Gouhier.

His studies of modern rationalism reflected a broader interest in the relationship between Catholic thought and secular culture that he had developed during years in Turin. After having been one of the first Italian readers of French Catholic philosopher Jacques Maritain, and a thoughtful anti-fascist, Del Noce turned after the war to the question of the relationship between Christianity and communism. In 1946 he published two essays on Marx which included an extended discussion of the place of atheism in Marx's philosophy. His works on Marx were part of a lifelong interest in the role of atheism in the history of modern philosophy, which culminated in 1964 in his magnum opus The Problem of Atheism. In 1965 he also published a large monographic work Catholic Reformation and Modern Philosophy, Vol. 1: Descartes. In 1966 Del Noce was appointed Professor of History of Modern and Contemporary Philosophy at the University of Trieste, but in 1970 he transferred to the University of Rome "La Sapienza", where he was appointed Professor of History of Political Doctrines and later Professor of Political Philosophy.

During the late 1960s and early 1970s, Del Noce's focus shifted to the theme of secularization and contemporary history. Some of his essays from this period were published in the 1971 volume The Age of Secularization. Later in that decade Del Noce returned to the question of the relationship between Catholics and Marxists and wrote two new books, The Catholic Communist and one of his most famous and controversial works, The Suicide of the Revolution, in which he argued that the process of dissolution of Marxism into neo-bourgeois nihilism is already at work in the thought of Antonio Gramsci. In his final years Del Noce became very much a "public intellectual", writing numerous articles in newspapers and weekly magazines, and becoming involved in the Italian political debate to the point of serving a term as a senator. His final philosophical work was an extensive monograph on the philosophy of Giovanni Gentile and on his relationship with fascism. Del Noce died suddenly on 30 December 1989, a few weeks after the fall of the Berlin wall had marked symbolically the final disintegration of the Marxist revolution, which he had predicted many years earlier on philosophical grounds. Although he was a distinguished scholar of early modern philosophy, he is especially remembered for his penetrating exegesis of the philosophy of Marx, for his innovative interpretation of fascism and for his critique of the progressive-technocratic culture that became gradually dominant in Europe after World War II.

== Philosophical themes ==
A common thread of Del Noce's work is the attempt to understand the connection between philosophical ideas and socio-political history. Against the prevailing Marxist and neo-positivist opinions of his contemporaries, he always maintained that philosophical ideas influence the course of human history, and that modern history in particular can only be understood as the unfolding of certain philosophical options (rationalism, immanentism, scientism). In fact, one of his core ideas was that modern history, if correctly interpreted, provides the best vindication of classical metaphysics by showing that rationalism leads to contradictory outcomes, as exemplified by the trajectory of Marxism. In some of his best known works he advanced the thesis that Marxism suffers what he called an "heterogenesis of ends", meaning that it is destined to triumph and self-destruct at the same time, due to its internal contradictions. To triumph, because Marx's radical atheism and materialism are the most consistent outcomes of European rationalism. To self-destruct because, as soon as the revolutionary dream fades away, Marxian historical materialism must degenerate into absolute relativism and open the way to a "perfectly bourgeois" society, a de-humanized world that does not recognize any permanent order of values and in which alienation becomes complete.

More generally, Del Noce regarded the expansion of atheism as the central question of modern philosophy. Its appearance at the endpoint of all forms of rationalism reveals that rationalism itself is based on a precondition, namely the decision to reject any notion of an original fall. A careful investigation of philosophy after Descartes shows that rejecting the status naturae lapsae was the first step in rejecting the supernatural, to be followed later on by the rejection of every form of transcendence. However, since these rejections cannot be based on any proof, atheism can only justify itself as the outcome of an irreversible historical process, understood as a process of secularization and, at the same time, as the only practical attitude which is capable of actually producing universal human fulfillment. In other words, for late rationalism the criterion of truth of a philosophy reduces to its ability to surpass and integrate all previous forms of thought. For this reason, Del Noce regarded the periodization of history of philosophy itself as the crucial theoretical question of contemporary philosophy. In his book The Problem of Atheism he argued that, precisely in order to place atheism in the history of philosophy, it is necessary to call into question and to abandon the view that the process of the history of thought is a unitary process towards immanentism. This shows that atheism is not the necessary outcome of modern philosophy, but rather a problematic outcome, inasmuch it does not lead to the promised fulfillment but rather to forms of nihilism. Contemporary history provides the best proof that the trajectory of rationalism has a nihilistic endpoint: atheism has achieved complete success not in the historical implementation of Marxism, but rather in the affluent society, which pushes to the extreme the de-humanization of the relationship with the other. In its historical realization Marxism has ended up being a stage in the development of the affluent society, which accepts all its negations of traditional thought but at the same time eliminates the messianic/religious aspect of Marxism.

In the late 1960s Del Noce focused his attention on the task of constructing a philosophical interpretation of the most recent developments in contemporary history. In particular, he felt the need for a clear philosophical understanding of the new challenges that were being posed by the progressivism of the 1960s (in both its secular and Catholic forms), by the rampant secularization of European society, by the sexual revolution and in general by the new technocratic and affluent society that had taken shape after the Second World War. His most significant essays from this period were collected in the volume The Age of Secularization. Del Noce argued that Western history after 1945 was marked by a particular interpretation of the historical period between the two World Wars. According to this "progressive" interpretation, Nazism and fascism were symptoms of a general collapse of European civilization, which must be replaced by a new civilization based on science and on the rejection of all metaphysical doctrines. This has led to a type of new Enlightenment, which however is an Enlightenment after Marx, inasmuch it preserves all of Marx's metaphysical negations. Del Noce maintained that the outcome of this new scientistic-relativistic-progressivist culture is necessarily nihilistic and totalitarian, since science per se is not capable of formulating new ideals. As a response, he developed a different interpretation of contemporary history, in which fascism and Nazism are just stages in a broader process of secularization that actually centers on Marxism and on the failure of the modern "revolutionary gnosis". He also argued that the correct way to answer the challenge posed by secularization is not by rejecting modernity altogether but by correcting it in light of the classical metaphysical tradition starting from Descartes, through Vico and Pascal, to Rosmini which does not lead to nihilism instead of Descartes to Nietzsche, the classical metaphysical tradition being the one that leads to a purification of classical metaphysical thought.

Del Noce wrote extensively about Freudo-Marxism and on the relationship between political progressivism and the sexual revolution. He argued that both of them are rooted in the denial a priori that human reason is capable of reaching meta-empirical truths, and so they are tightly linked with scientism, the dogmatic belief that the empirical sciences are the only form of rationality. The reduction of reason to science goes hand in hand with the reduction of freedom to the satisfaction of instincts, which in turn is expressed politically as fight against "repression" and leads to a radical rejection of all traditional values. He further argued that the scientistic postulate is intrinsically totalitarian, inasmuch it de-legitimates all other forms of knowledge.

Del Noce also studied in depth the relationship between freedom and authority. In a long essay from 1975 he argued that, whereas in the classic and humanistic tradition authority was associated with liberation (e.g. from the power of sub-human instincts and from social manipulation), contemporary culture associates authority with repression. As a result, the modern world confuses authority and power with disastrous effects. In particular, the progressive culture since World War II has associated the defense of freedom with the rejection of metaphysical knowledge and the embrace of relativism. However, any form of liberalism that does not acknowledge the nature of authority must conclude to an even greater oppression, by making the individual completely dependent on society. According to Del Noce, freedom can only be defended by rediscovering the true meaning of authority, which is tightly linked to the idea of evidence. Evidence is the foundation and the paradigm of authority, because it asks of the mind a more radical submission than could be obtained by force, but in this submission the mind finds its ultimate liberation from all arbitrary social powers. Thus, Del Noce said, the theme of authority brings us back to the Socratic origins of classical metaphysics, which have to be rediscovered in order to overcome the present crisis of our civilization.

== Selected bibliography ==
=== In English ===
- Thomism and the critique of rationalism, Communio 25 (1998): 732-45
- The Crisis of Modernity, McGill-Queen's University Press, Montreal 2015
- Authority versus power, Communio 42 (2015): 265-300
- The lesson of Maritain, Maritain Studies 31 (2016): 71-80
- The Age of Secularization, McGill-Queen's University Press, Montreal 2017
- Marxism died in the East because it realized itself in the West, Church Life Journal, 16 January 2020
- The Problem of Atheism, McGill-Queen's University Press, Montreal 2021

=== In Italian ===
- Il problema dell'ateismo, Il Mulino, Bologna 1964
- Riforma cattolica e filosofia moderna, vol. I, Cartesio, Il Mulino, Bologna 1965
- Il problema politico dei cattolici, UIPC, Roma 1967
- L'epoca della secolarizzazione, Giuffrè, Milano 1970
- L'Eurocomunismo e l'Italia, Europa informazioni, Roma 1976
- Il suicidio della rivoluzione, Rusconi, Milano 1978
- Il cattolico comunista, Rusconi, Milano 1981
- L'interpretazione transpolitica della storia contemporanea, Guida, Napoli 1982
- Secolarizzazione e crisi della modernità, Esi, Napoli 1982
- Giovanni Gentile. Per una interpretazione filosofica della storia contemporanea, Il Mulino, Bologna 1990 (posthumous)
- Rivoluzione Risorgimento Tradizione, Giuffrè, Milano 1993 (posthumous)

=== In French ===
- L’irréligion occidentale: deux essais philosophiques, Fac-éditions, 1995
- L'époque de la sécularisation, éditions des Syrtes, 2001
- Gramsci ou "le suicide de la révolution", édition du Cerf, 2010

=== In German ===
- Ideen zur Interpretation des Faschismus, in Ernst Nolte, ed., Theorien über den Faschismus: 416-425, Kiepenheuer & Witsch, Berlin 1967

=== In Spanish ===
- Agonia de la sociedad opulenta, Ed. Univ. de Navarra, 1979
- Modernidad. Interpretación transpolítica de la historia contemporánea, Ed. Encuentro, Madrid 2017
- Gramsci o el suicidio de la revolución, Prometeo Libros, Buenos Aires 2021
