= Riccardo Zanella =

Italian politician (1875–1959)

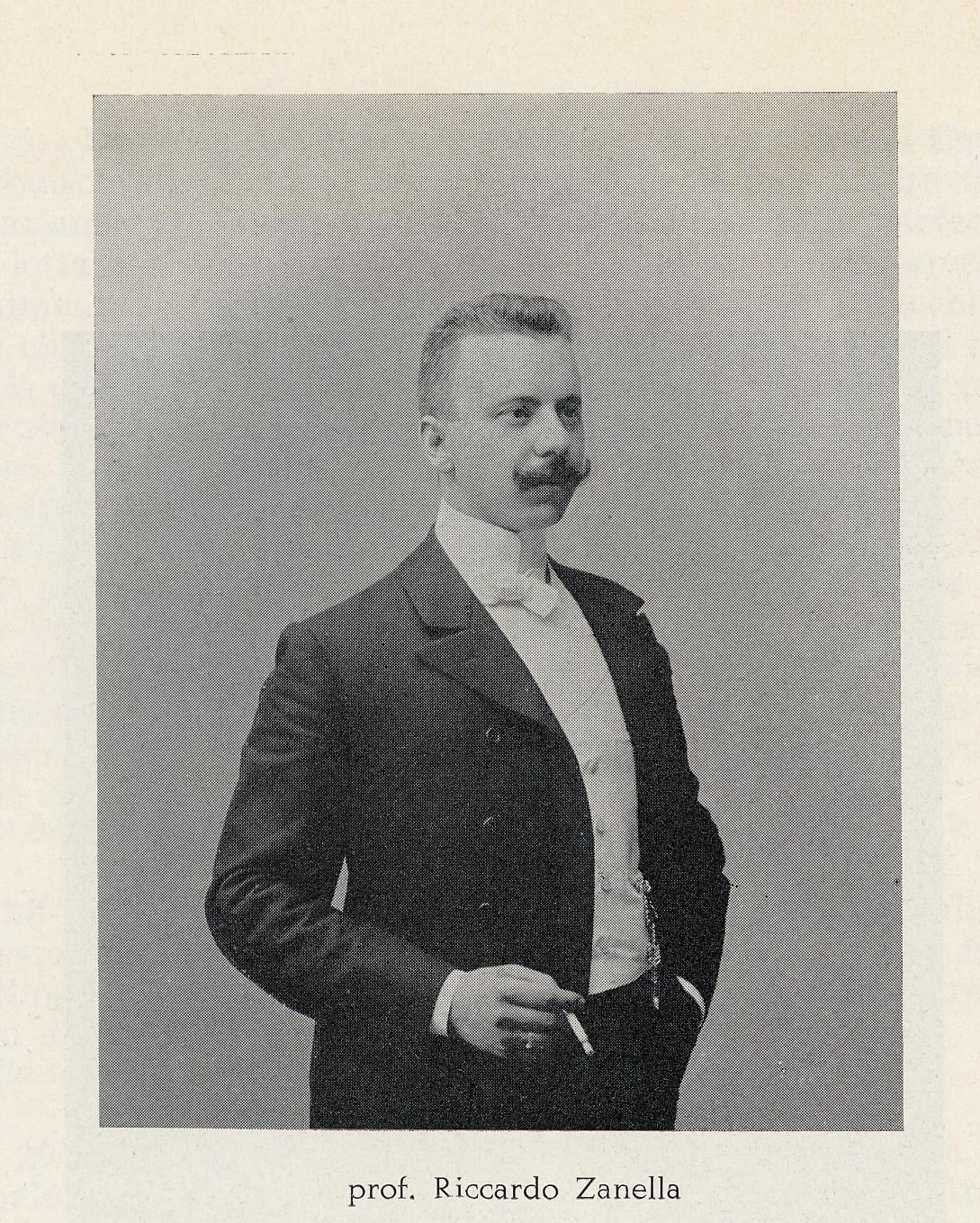

1st President of the Free State of Fiume
- In office 5 October 1921 – 3 March 1922
- Preceded by: Office established
- Succeeded by: Giovanni Giuriati

Personal details
- Born: 27 June 1875 Fiume, Austria-Hungary
- Died: 30 March 1959 (aged 83) Rome, Italy
- Resting place: Cimitero Monumentale Verano, Rome, Italy
- Party: Autonomist Association
- Occupation: Politician

Riccardo Zanella (27 June 1875 – 30 March 1959) was a Fiuman politician who was the only elected president of the short-lived Free State of Fiume.

== Biography ==
Zanella was born to an Italian father and Slovene mother in Fiume, Austria-Hungary (present-day Croatia). He attended Hungarian Commercial School in Fiume and Budapest. Soon he was a teacher of bookkeeping in the same school in Fiume, but year later he resigned. During the clash between Liberalism and radicalism in Hungary, Zanella emerged as the local leader of the Kossuthist faction in Fiume. He became the leader of the Autonomist Association, known also as the Autonomist Party in Fiume, after Michele Maylender resigned in 1901.

With Zanella, the party abandoned its liberal stance and turned to the Kossuthist Independence Party for support. Embracing a staunch Italian nationalist stance (in its vehemence typical of the Kossuthists political style) his popularity grew especially among the lower and middle classes, eventually becoming elected mayor (Podestà) of Fiume in 1914, but the nomination was vetoed by the Emperor Franz Joseph. During World War I, Zanella fought in a Hungarian unit on the Russian front where he promptly deserted to the Russians.

In 1916 he arrived in Rome where he started an agitation campaign for the Italian annexation of Fiume. After the War ended in 1918 he came back to Fiume where he was greeted as a hero, but quickly distanced himself from the Italian National Council in Fiume that assumed the powers in the city. After Gabriele D'Annunzio on 12 September 1919, seized the city of Fiume, Zanella led the Autonomist opposition to D'Annunzio's regime of occupation and personal dictatorship. His chance came as D'Annunzio ignored the Treaty of Rapallo and declared war on Italy itself, finally surrendering the city in December 1920 after a bombardment by the Italian navy.

Zanella served in office as president of the Free State of Fiume from 5 October 1921 to 3 March 1922, when his term was cut short due to Italian occupation, following a fascist putsch. Italy formally annexed the territory on 16 March 1924. During the 1930's Zanella resided mainly in exile in Belgrade. Following World War II Zanella demanded the restoration of the Free State as a sovereign entity but failed to receive support for his idea at the United Nations Conference on International Organization in San Francisco. Nevertheless, he restated the request also to the London Council of Foreign Ministers in September 1945. Thereby he compared the Free State of Fiume, "submerged by an act of Fascist aggression" to that of Albania and Ethiopia. Moreover, he denied its annexation to Croatia or Yugoslavia, where it never belonged, since it was a country of the Holy Crown of Hungary. Zanella's efforts proved utterly unsuccessful and he died in exile in Rome in 1959.

== See also ==
- Governors and Heads of State of Fiume
