= Fiume question =

Territorial dispute after World War I

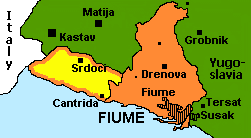
Map of the Free State of Fiume: former Corpus Separatum (brown), Free State of Fiume territory (brown and yellow)

In the aftermath of the First World War, the Fiume question was the dispute regarding the postwar fate of the city of Rijeka (Italian: Fiume) and its surroundings. As an element of the Adriatic question, the dispute arose from competing claims by the Kingdom of Italy and the short-lived State of Slovenes, Croats and Serbs carved out in the process of the dissolution of Austria-Hungary. The latter claim was taken over by the Kingdom of Serbs, Croats and Slovenes (later renamed Yugoslavia), itself formed through unification of the State of Slovenes, Croats and Serbs with the Kingdom of Serbia in late 1918. In its claim, Italy relied on provisions of the Treaty of London, concluded in 1915, as well as on provisions of the Armistice of Villa Giusti, which allowed the victorious Allies of World War I to occupy unspecified Austro-Hungarian territories if necessary.

In determining ownership of Rijeka, both sides in the dispute claimed the right of self-determination championed by US President Woodrow Wilson in his Fourteen Points, but the two sides defined the extent of the city of Rijeka differently, resulting in majority of the affected population being either Italians or South Slavs (largely Croats and Slovenes). The difference in interpretation of the city boundaries was that Italians claimed the city was limited to the territory of the Corpus Separatum, established as a special administrative unit attached to the Hungarian crown within Austria-Hungary, while the Yugoslav side claimed that the suburb of Sušak, located outside the Corpus Separatum, represented an inseparable part of the city. Two competing administrations were established in the city following the departure of Hungarian authorities in late October 1918. In November, the city was placed under Allied occupation in which the Italian Army provided the bulk of the occupying force. The occupying force left after Italian irredentist and nationalist writer Gabriele D'Annunzio seized the city in September 1919 proclaiming its annexation for Italy.

The matter was not resolved by the 1919 Paris Peace Conference because Wilson opposed Italian claims based on the Treaty of London, but the Italian government would not accept a compromise due to its political instability. The Italian-Yugoslav border was first resolved by the 1920 Treaty of Rapallo. The agreement provided for establishment of the city-state of the Free State of Fiume—against D'Annunzio's objections. In response, he proclaimed an independent Italian Regency of Carnaro in Rijeka and declared war on Italy, only to be driven from the city in an armed intervention by the Regia Marina. Italian troops remained in Rijeka (and Sušak until 1923). The Free State of Fiume was abolished by the 1924 Treaty of Rome, and the city annexed to Italy. In World War II, the Yugoslav Partisans took control of Rijeka in 1945. In an agreement with the Allies of World War II, authorities of the Democratic Federal Yugoslavia provisionally administered Rijeka and its surrounding areas until 1947. Then the city was formally ceded to Yugoslavia under the Treaty of Paris between Italy and the Allied Powers.

== Background ==
Upon the outbreak of World War I, the Kingdom of Italy, nominally part of the Triple Alliance but with historical territorial disputes with Austria-Hungary, especially over Italian-speaking populations in Austrian Trentino and Trieste, remained neutral. As the war progressed, domestic support for Italian intervention on the side of the Entente grew, and in April 1915 Italy signed the secret Treaty of London with the Entente, which promised the country substantial territorial gains — including much of Dalmatia, but not Rijeka — in exchange for its entry into the war, which took place on 23 May 1915. The treaty was opposed by representatives of the South Slavs living in Austria-Hungary, who were organised as the Yugoslav Committee. Following the 3 November 1918 Armistice of Villa Giusti, the Austro-Hungarian surrender, Italian troops moved to occupy parts of the eastern Adriatic shore promised to Italy under the Treaty of London, ahead of the Paris Peace Conference. The State of Slovenes, Croats and Serbs, carved out from areas of Austria-Hungary populated by South Slavs (encompassing the Slovene lands, Croatia-Slavonia, Dalmatia, and Bosnia and Herzegovina), authorised the Yugoslav Committee to represent it abroad. The short-lived state, shortly before it sought a union with the Kingdom of Serbia to establish the Kingdom of Serbs, Croats and Slovenes (later renamed Yugoslavia), laid a competing claim to the eastern Adriatic to counter Italy's demands. This claim was supported by deployment of the Royal Serbian Army (subsequently reformed as the Royal Yugoslav Army) to the area. The newly established state was initially denied diplomatic recognition. France and the United Kingdom did not recognise the new state before June 1919. The recognition took place in the run-up to conclusion of the Treaty of Versailles—with Yugoslavia as one of its signatories.

== Hungarian rule ==
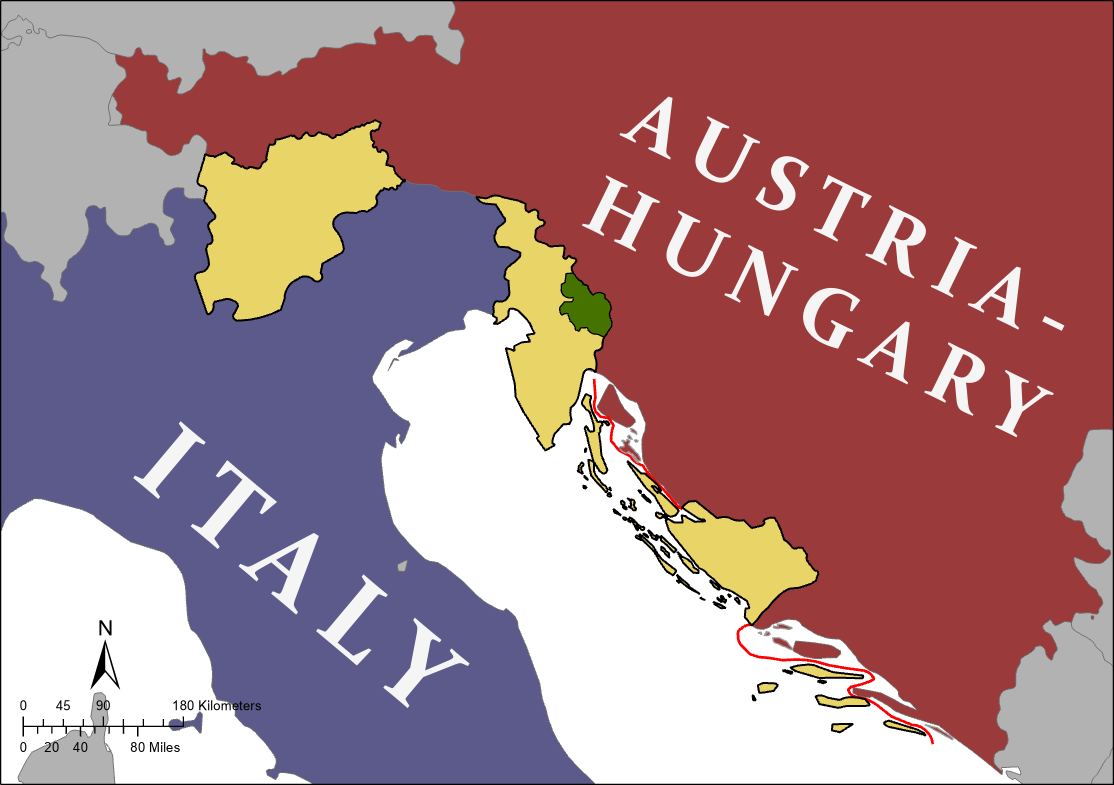
Territories promised to Italy by the 1915 Treaty of London, i.e. Trentino-Alto Adige, the Julian March and Dalmatia (tan), and the Snežnik Plateau area (green).

Since at least the 18th century, Croatia and Hungary, both realms of the Habsburg monarchy, laid competing claims on the city of Rijeka (Italian: Fiume) as a part of their national territory and an important Adriatic port. In 1776, the city was attached to Hungarian crown by Empress Maria Theresa as a separatum coronae adnexum corpus (lit. 'separate body attached to the crown'). The Latin title was commonly shortened to Corpus Separatum. During the Hungarian Revolution of 1848, the city was annexed to Croatia by Ban Josip Jelačić. The move was reversed following the Austro-Hungarian Compromise of 1867 and the Croatian–Hungarian Settlement of 1868. The latter indicated that the city would be a separate body within Austria-Hungary, belonging to the Hungarian crown. The Croatian Sabor and the Parliament of Hungary were to determine the specific conditions of the city's status, but, for two years, they failed to reach an agreement. In 1870, the Hungarian Parliament enacted a regulation on temporary Hungarian control of Rijeka. The regulation remained in effect until 1918. The city outgrew the territory of the Corpus Separatum through industrialisation, and its suburb of Sušak, largely inhabited by workers employed by factories in the city centre, was situated in Croatian territory.

In the final phase of World War I, in an effort to prevent the dissolution of Austria-Hungary, Emperor Charles I of Austria declared an intention to transform the monarchy into a federal state, indicating that Rijeka would be a part of the Croatia-Slavonia or a newly established South Slavic kingdom. The Emperor's declaration echoed the 1917 May Declaration of the Yugoslav Club, demanding unification of Habsburg lands inhabited by Croats, Slovenes, and Serbs into a democratic, free, and independent state organised as a Habsburg realm. Just as the May Declaration was ignored by relevant political parties, the imperial declaration was rejected by the Zagreb-based National Council of Slovenes, Croats and Serbs, the self-proclaimed central organ of the State of Slovenes, Croats and Serbs. In mid-October, Andrea Ossoinack, speaking in the Hungarian Parliament as the representative of the Corpus Separatum, objected to the Emperor's idea and stated that the city should be handed over to Italy. Clashes erupted in the city between Italian and South Slavic communities, each side claiming the city on the basis of the right to self-determination. While the former pointed to an Italian majority in the city within the boundaries of the Corpus Separatum, the latter pointed out that the city, including the suburb of Sušak located outside the Corpus Separatum, had a South Slavic majority. According to the 1910 Austro-Hungarian census, 23,283 citizens or nearly 47% of Rijeka's population within the Corpus Separatum were Italian, while Croats and Slovenes accounted for 19,668, or almost 40%. According to Italian historian Attilio Tamaro, the suburb of Sušak, lying outside the boundaries of the former Corpus Separatum, had a population of 13,214 (of which 11,000 were South Slavs) in 1918. According to Tamaro, the numbers were not contested, but it was disputed if Sušak was an integral part of Rijeka or not.

On 23 October, pro-Croatian troops entered Rijeka, and Lieutenant Colonel Petar Teslić assumed military authority in Rijeka and Sušak. He had under his command eight battalions of the 79th Infantry Regiment of the former Austro-Hungarian Common Army, normally based in Otočac, and National Guard volunteers, largely consisting of high-school students. On 29 October, the last Hungarian governor of the Corpus Separatum, Zoltán Jékelfalussy, left the city for Hungary on a special train, on the orders of Hungarian prime minister Sándor Wekerle. He was followed by the bulk of the city's police force. A large number of skilled workers, especially ethnic Hungarians, also left. Before departing, Jékelfalussy transferred authority to a commission appointed by the National Council of Slovenes, Croats and Serbs. The commission was led by Rikard Lenac. On the other hand, leading ethnic Italians living in the city established the Italian National Council of Fiume. The Italian National Council, led by Antonio Grossich, proclaimed that it would annex the city to Italy on 30 October. On 3 November, Grossich dispatched a delegation to Venice to request aid from Admiral Paolo Thaon di Revel. At the time, di Revel chaired the Naval Commission for the Adriatic, established by the Allied Naval Council of the Supreme War Council tasked with coordinating the Allied occupation forces in the eastern Adriatic. Lenac asked Zagreb to send troops as well.

== Allied occupation ==
On 2 November 1918, a group of United States Navy ships sailed into the Port of Rijeka. The next day, a French and a British force followed with Colonel Sydney Capel Peck leading the British mission to Rijeka. On the same day, the Inter-Allied Command was established in Rijeka, ostensibly to prevent further ethnic violence. On 3 November, the day the armistice was signed, Italian armed forces gained control of much of the nearby Istria peninsula to the west. The Italian navy first sailed into the Port of Rijeka on 4 November. The initial group consisted of the battleship Emanuele Filiberto, and the destroyers Francesco Stocco, Vincenzo Giordano Orsini, and Giuseppe Sirtori. On 5 November, the French destroyers Touareg and Sakalave brought further reinforcements.

A 700-strong battalion of the First Yugoslav Volunteer Division led by Lieutenant Colonel Vojin Maksimović arrived from Zagreb on 15 November. Two days later, 16,000 Italian troops led by General Enrico Asinari di San Marzano arrived as well. The battalion of the First Yugoslav Volunteer Division withdrew from the city and Teslić's troops were quickly disarmed. Some sources indicate that Maksimović's withdrawal from the city was negotiated and made in exchange for the promise that San Marzano's troops would not enter Rijeka, but remain in nearby Opatija (Italian: Abbazia) instead. Even though neither Rijeka nor Sušak were awarded to Italy under the Treaty of London, Italian authorities justified the deployment by referring to provisions of the armistice allowing occupation of additional territories required for strategic purposes. On such grounds, the Allied troops occupied Rijeka, Sušak, as well as the area of Kostrena (Italian: Costrena) and Draga to the Bakar (Italian: Buccari) railway station, and a part of the Grobnik area. On 12 December 1918, Italian cavalry attempted to advance into Kraljevica (Italian: Porto Re), but it was repelled by the Royal Yugoslav Army. By spring 1919, there were approximately 20,000 Italian troops in Rijeka. In December 1918, the Italian National Council conducted a census in Rijeka where 62% were registered as Italians, and 23% as Croats or Slovenes. According to Croatian sources, the 1918 census data were collected under duress and falsely recorded. Sušak's population was estimated at 12,000 in 1919.

The Adriatic Commission discussed the Italian military dominance in the British zone and recommended the Paris Peace Conference to ensure military parity with other allied forces. Since Italy objected to the recommendation, the Paris Peace Conference ultimately did not act upon it. Between January and August 1919, the Italian National Council took steps to ensure the independence of the city from the systems previously put in place by Austria-Hungary. Postage stamps and Austro-Hungarian krone banknotes were stamped over, and the Fiume krone introduced into circulation. In August 1919, the council investigated civil servants, dismissing and expelling those considered undesirable.

On 6 July, the paramilitary Legione "Fiumana" loyal to Italy clashed with troops from French Annam in the city, killing 13. This prompted the establishment of an international commission to determine the legionnaires' responsibility. The commission recommended disbanding the Legione "Fiumana" and reducing Italian troops in the area to a single battalion as quickly as possible, leaving law enforcement to the British and the US forces. Those recommendations were not implemented. However, the 1st Regiment "Granatieri di Sardegna" was withdrawn from the city and moved to Ronchi dei Monfalcone near Trieste on 27 August 1919.

== Paris Peace Conference negotiations ==
The problem of establishing the border between Italy and Yugoslavia—referred to as the Adriatic question—including the Fiume question became a major point of dispute at the Paris Peace Conference. Since 1917, Italy used the annexation of the Kingdom of Montenegro by Serbia and the unification of the countries, known as the Montenegrin question, to pressure Serbia into concessions. While the Italian representatives at the peace conference demanded enforcement of the Treaty of London and the additional award of Rijeka, US President Woodrow Wilson opposed their demands. In early 1918, Wilson had put forward his Fourteen Points, which favoured a solution that relied on local self-determination. Applying the Fourteen Points, the United States representatives argued that the Treaty of London was invalid. Instead, Wilson proposed a division of the Istrian peninsula along the Wilson Line that largely corresponded to the ethnic makeup of the population, and a free-city status for Rijeka based on the city's legal position of a corpus separatum within Austria-Hungary. The British and French did not support enforcement of the treaty, as they thought Italy deserved relatively little due to its neutrality early in the war.

After the Allies had rejected the Italian claims under the Treaty of London and claims regarding Rijeka, Prime Minister Vittorio Emanuele Orlando's government was replaced in June 1919 by one led by Francesco Saverio Nitti. The new prime minister wanted to settle diplomatic issues abroad before concentrating on domestic issues. In that respect, Italian Foreign Minister Tommaso Tittoni, was inclined to agree with the British and the French that Rijeka should be a free city under the League of Nations and that the entirety of Dalmatia should belong to Yugoslavia.

== D'Annunzio's march on Rijeka ==
Italian irredentist and nationalist writer Gabriele D'Annunzio became involved in resolution of the Fiume question. In order to preempt a settlement of the issue in a manner unfavourable for Italy, D'Annunzio set out with approximately 200 veterans to Rijeka on the evening of 11 September. When the column reached Ronchi del Monfalcone, it was joined by the Granatieri di Sardegna. Now about 2,500-strong, the column proceeded towards Rijeka and reached it the next day. D'Annunzio spoke from the balcony of the governor's mansion the same day announcing the city's annexation to Italy. Nitti reacted to D'Annunzio's move with shock and anger, amazed at the disloyalty of the troops, and put the city under blockade; Wilson suspected that Nitti was complicit in the march. Following D'Annunzio's arrival, the British, American, and French troops left the city, leaving only the Italian contingent behind. Politicians of the radical right-wing Italian Nationalist Association attempted to meet with D'Annunzio in Rijeka and convince him to lead a march on Rome to topple Nitti. The government felt it was losing control over the army, and the military governor of the Julian March, General Pietro Badoglio, reported that he could not prevent officers and soldiers from defecting to D'Annunzio. A government minister told the US ambassador that Italy was on the verge of a civil war.

By late 1919, Yugoslav representatives, led by the former Prime Minister Nikola Pašić and the Foreign Minister Ante Trumbić, could not agree with Italian diplomats on the border. In response, they were instructed by the Allies to settle the issue through direct negotiations after the Paris Peace Conference. A particular obstacle to any agreement was D'Annunzio's popularity and his occupation of Rijeka. The Italian government felt compelled to reject a draft agreement submitted by the United Kingdom, the United States, and France believing any compromise regarding the city's status would threaten the government's stability. At the same time, Pašić's and Trumbić's refusal to agree to the plan provoked the French and British to threaten to enforce the Treaty of London unless they supported the proposal put forward by the Allies. In turn, Wilson blocked the Franco-British move by threatening not to ratify the Treaty of Versailles. In Croatia, the Yugoslav government's inability to obtain a favourable solution of the Fiume question was interpreted as a result of its disinterest in issues not affecting Serbia directly.

D'Annunzio's time in Fiume had a significant impact on the development of Italian Fascism. Much of Fascism's aesthetics and rituals, the use of mass politics as spectacle, as well as the cults of paramilitarism, youth, and elite leadership, were taken from D'Annunzio; many of his supporters joined the Fascist movement. The march on Fiume was seen as an attempt to complete the Risorgimento and build a national civic religion: a complaint of Italian nationalists since the unification itself, and a goal that Fascism also took up. The disorder and disloyalty of the troops in Italian occupied territory helped to undermine the country's parliamentary democracy and foreshadowed Mussolini's 1922 March on Rome. However, there were also substantial ideological differences between D'Annunzian Fiume and the National Fascist Party, which by the end of 1920 was moving to the right; the liberatory utopianism and revolutionary syndicalism, expressed at Fiume in the Charter of Carnaro, was thought of by Mussolini as unrealistic and unsuitable as a blueprint for Fascist ideology. D'Annunzio himself neither publicly supported nor opposed Mussolini's regime, largely retiring from national politics following the end of the Fiume endeavour.

== Interwar border agreements ==
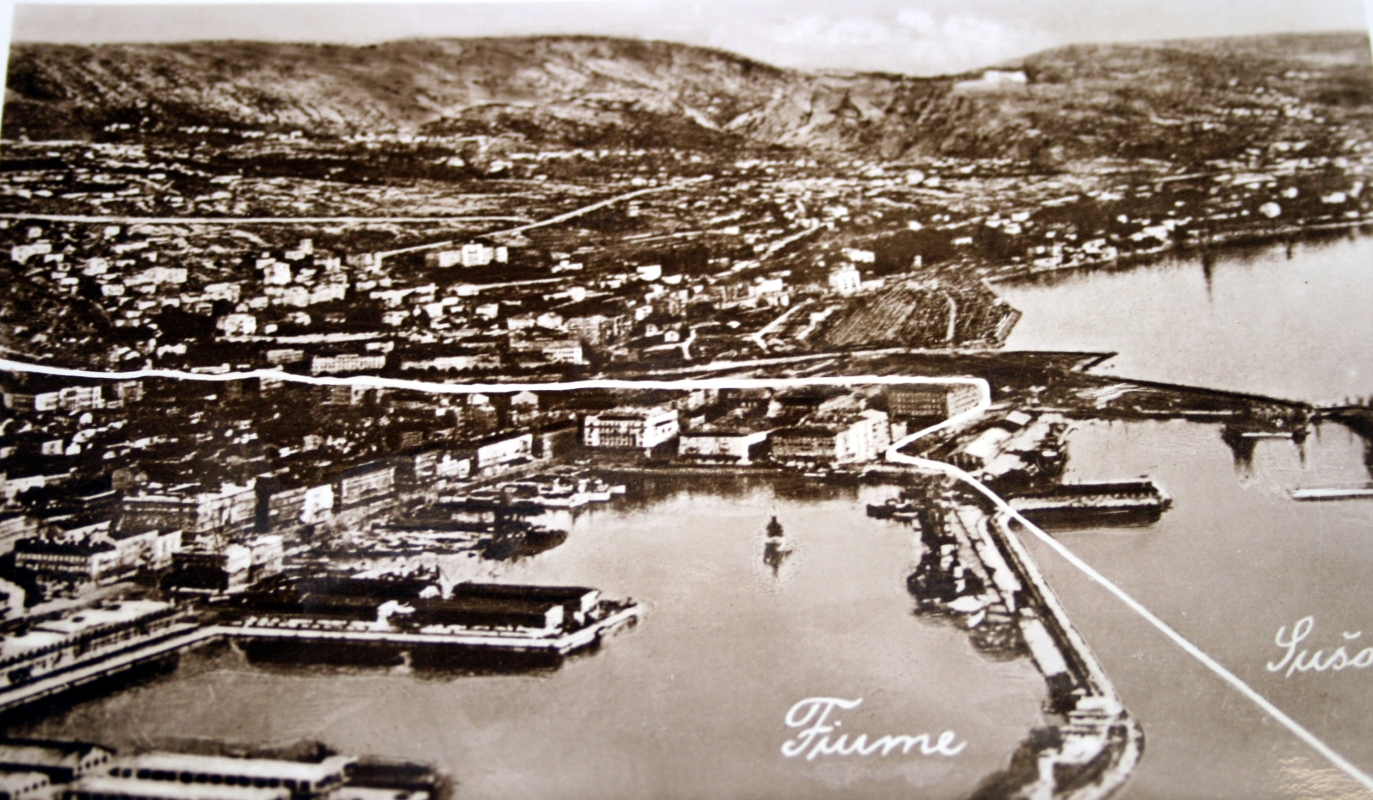
A view of the Italian–Yugoslav border in the Port of Rijeka in 1937

Beginning in the spring of 1920, the United Kingdom and France applied pressure on the Yugoslav Prime Minister Milenko Radomar Vesnić and Foreign Minister Trumbić to resolve the Adriatic question, claiming that it represented a threat to peace in Europe. At the same time, the Italian Foreign Minister, Carlo Sforza, indicated he was ready to trade Italian claims in Dalmatia for British and French backing of Italian claims in Istria. In June, Hungary formally renounced its possession of Corpus Separatum through the Treaty of Trianon. In September 1920, Sforza told the President of France, Alexandre Millerand, that he only wanted to enforce the Treaty of London regarding Istria and that he wanted none of Dalmatia except the city of Zadar (Italian: Zara). At the same time, on 8 September, D'Annunzio proclaimed independence for Rijeka and its surroundings, styled as the Italian Regency of Carnaro. Following the 1920 presidential election, US support for Wilson's ideas appeared to have ended, compelling Vesnić and Trumbić into bilateral negotiations with Sforza. Moreover, Prince Regent Alexander I of Yugoslavia wanted an agreement with Italy at any cost, in pursuit of political stability in his country. According to Sforza, Vesnić later told him he was advised not to resist Italian demands for fear that Italy might impose a solution unilaterally.

Sforza's treaty proposal was supported by the British and French, while the US remained silent on the matter, leaving Yugoslavs isolated. He demanded Istria and the Snežnik (Italian: Monte Nevoso). Negotiations took place between 9–11 November 1920, resulting in the Treaty of Rapallo signed on 12 November. The treaty gave Italy Istria, the Julian March, a portion of the Kvarner Gulf just to the west of Rijeka, as well as the city of Zadar and a number of islands. The treaty also established the independent Free State of Fiume, defining its boundaries as those of the former Austro-Hungarian Corpus Separatum, with the addition of a strip of land connecting it to the Italian territory in Istria between the Kvarner Gulf and the town of Kastav (Italian: Castua).

D'Annunzio condemned the treaty in a declaration of 17 November. The Italian Regency of Carnaro proclaimed a state of war four days later. By the end of the year, the Regia Marina drove D'Annunzio from Rijeka in an intervention known as Bloody Christmas. The five-day military intervention came after a failed Italian diplomatic effort to persuade D'Annunzio to leave. The city was blockaded and strategic points bombarded by the battleship Andrea Doria. D'Annunzio left the city after the street fighting.

The Treaty of Rapallo left Sušak Yugoslavian, but the Italian military would not leave it before March 1923. Negotiations on the Italian pullout continued until an agreement was reached in Santa Margherita Ligure on 1 August 1922 confirming Yugoslav sovereignty over Sušak. However, a further disagreement arose on location of the border. Mussolini, then the newly appointed prime minister, held that Sušak territory was exclusively on the left bank of the Rječina River, but he ultimately conceded the Yugoslav claims on the Delta and Baroš areas of the Port of Rijeka, on the opposite bank. Rijeka became the city-state envisaged by the Treaty of Rapallo. Following the October 1922 March on Rome, Mussolini ordered military occupation of Rijeka to continue, and Italy formally annexed the city under the Treaty of Rome, which it concluded with Yugoslavia in 1924. The loss of the hinterland served by the Port of Rijeka led to the decline of importance of both the port and the city, despite the introduction of free economic zone privileges. Under the Treaty of Rome, Yugoslavia retained Sušak.

Italian authorities took another census taken in 1925, indicating 79% of the city's population was Italian. From 1918 to 1925, the city's demographics changed considerably through the settlement of regnicoli settlers arriving from prewar Italian territories, and the departure of the Croatian population hastened due to increased looting and violence directed against them in response to the death of the captain of the cruiser Puglia in a clash in Split in July 1920.

== Aftermath ==
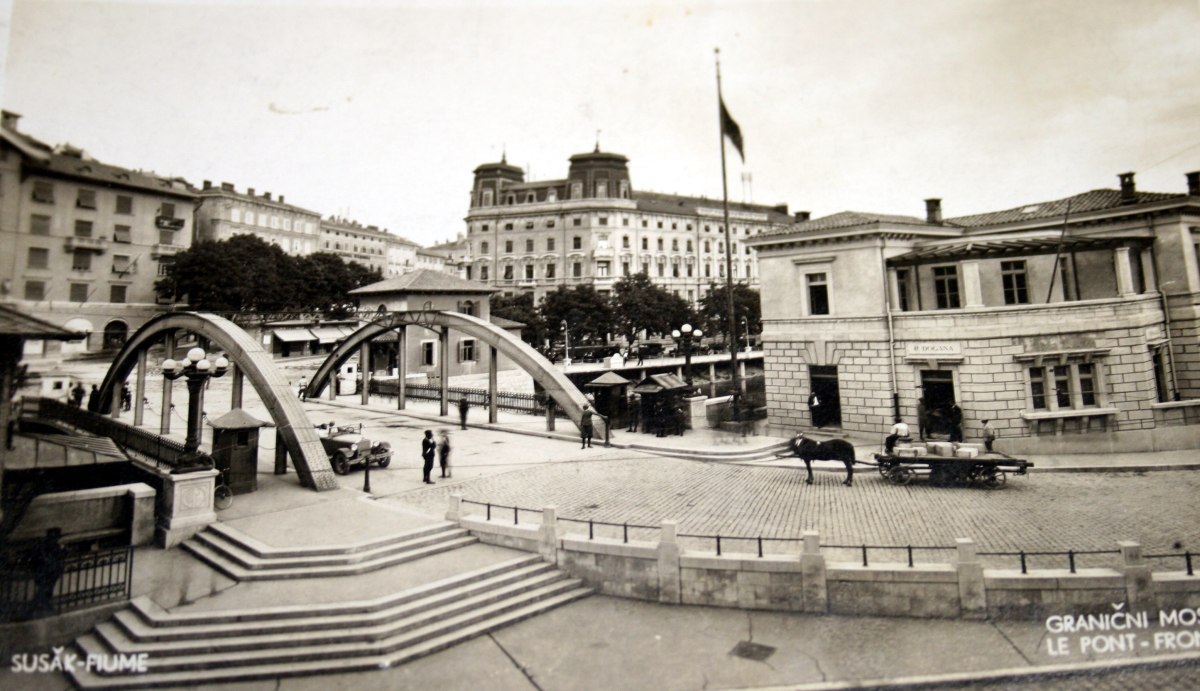
Border bridge spanning the Rječina between Rijeka and Sušak in 1933

During World War II, on 6 April 1941, the Axis powers invaded Yugoslavia and, four days later, the puppet state of Independent State of Croatia (NDH) was established by Slavko Kvaternik on behalf of the Italian-based fascist organisation Ustaše. Ustaše leader Ante Pavelić and his followers were equipped by Italy and permitted to drive from Pistoia via Trieste to Zagreb only after publicly endorsing Italian territorial expansion along the eastern Adriatic shore. Those claims were enforced through the 1941 Treaties of Rome, specifically the Italian–Croatian Treaty on Frontiers. It defined the bulk of the border between the NDH and Italy, largely concerning parts of Dalmatia and Adriatic islands. It also gave Italy a strip of land in northwest of Croatia, near Rijeka. There, the border was drawn to give Italy the cities of Kastav, Sušak, Fužine (Italian: Fusine), Čabar, Bakar, and a part of the Delnice district.

Following the 1943 Armistice of Cassibile and the Italian surrender, Pavelić declared the 1941 Treaties of Rome, including the territorial changes agreed under the treaty, void. In his declaration, Pavelić also announced the annexation of areas previously outside Yugoslavia, including Rijeka. This move was blocked by Nazi Germany, which established the Operational Zone of the Adriatic Littoral, which included Rijeka.

Yugoslav Partisans took control of Rijeka on 3 May 1945. On 9 and 20 June, authorities of the Democratic Federal Yugoslavia concluded agreements with the United Kingdom and the United States in Belgrade and Duino on the administration of specific Italian territories. Those areas included a part of Istria and the Julian March organised as Zone A under Allied administration; Rijeka and the rest of Istria formed Zone B, governed by the Yugoslav Army Military Administration (Vojna uprava Jugoslavenske armije, VUJA). The VUJA was led by Colonel Većeslav Holjevac. After World War II, Rijeka and its surroundings were formally ceded by Italy to Yugoslavia (and indirectly to the People's Republic of Croatia) through the 1947 Treaty of Paris between Italy and the Allied Powers. Sušak formally became part of the city of Rijeka in 1948. Croatian sources estimate that more than 20,000 people left Rijeka and moved to Italian-controlled territory from 1945 to 1947. Italian sources claim that 31,840 people left Rijeka in the course of the postwar Istrian–Dalmatian exodus lasting more than a decade.

== Sources ==
- "The Treaty of Rapallo: Complete Official Text of the Italo-Jugoslav Pact, for the First Time Presented in English". Current History. 13 (2, Part II). Berkeley: University of California Press: 223–226. 1921. ISSN 0011-3530. JSTOR 45325919.
- Adriano, Pino; Cingolani, Giorgio (2018). Nationalism and Terror: Ante Pavelić and Ustasha Terrorism from Fascism to the Cold War. Budapest: Central European University Press. ISBN 9789633862063.
- Badurina, Marino (2014). "Rijeka u drugoj polovici 20. stoljeća: od obnove preko ubrzanog razvoja do stagnacije" [Rijeka in the second half of the 20th century: from recovery through rapid development to stagnation]. Essehist: časopis studenata povijesti i drugih društveno-humanističkih znanosti (in Croatian). 6 (6). Osijek: University of Osijek: 126–131. ISSN 1847-6236.
- Bali, Lóránt; Gulyás, László (2011). "The Fiume Question 1918–1920". Öt Kontinens (8). Budapest: Eötvös Loránd Tudományegyetem, Új-és Jelenkori Egyetemes Történeti Tanszék: 143–150. ISSN 1589-3839.
- Bali, Lóránt (2013). "The Historically Changing Role of Port Rijeka in the Hungarian Context (1719–1941), with a Special View on Trieste". Central European Papers. 1 (2). Opava: Slezská univerzita v Opavě, Fakulta veřejných politik: 23–28. doi:10.25142/cep.2013.013. ISSN 2336-3312.
- Banac, Ivo (1984). The National Question in Yugoslavia: Origins, History, Politics. Ithaca: Cornell University Press. ISBN 0-8014-1675-2.
- Bartulović, Željko (2000). "Sušak u odnosima Kraljevine SHS i Italije 1918–1925" [Sušak in the Relations Between the Kingdom of Serbs, Croats and Slovenes and the Kingdom of Italy (1918–1925)]. Povećalo: časopis povijesnih korijena, gonetanja, postignuća... (in Croatian). 50 (6). Zagreb: Faculty of Law, University of Zagreb: 957–987. ISSN 0350-2058.
- Bartulović, Željko (2013). "Talijanska okupacija Sušaka 1918. – 1923." [Italian Occupation of Sušak 1918–1923] (PDF). In Jurković, Ivan (ed.). Bertošin zbornik: Zbornik u čast Miroslava Bertoše [Bertoša's Proceedings: Proceedings in Honour of Miroslav Bertoša] (PDF) (in Croatian). Vol. 3. Pula: Juraj Dobrila University of Pula. pp. 159–178. ISBN 978-953-7498-69-6.
- Bartulović, Željko (2021). "Ugarska politika prema Rijeci i 100. Obljetnica Trianonskog mirovnog ugovora" [Hungarian Policy Towards Rijeka and 100th Anniversary of the Trianon Peace Treaty]. Zbornik Pravnog fakulteta u Zagrebu (in Croatian). 2–3 (24–25). Beli Manastir: Zavod za baranjsku povjesnicu: 61–86. ISSN 1330-1667.
- Batović, Ante; Kasalo, Branko (2021). "Great Britain and the Adriatic Question after World War I". In Bralić, Ante; Kasalo, Branko (eds.). The Eastern Adriatic Between the Collapse of the Habsburg Monarchy and the Creation of New States. Zadar: University of Zadar. pp. 299–330. ISBN 978-953-331-341-2.
- Burgwyn, H. James (1997). Italian Foreign Policy in the Interwar Period 1918–1940. Westport: Praeger Publishers. ISBN 9780275948771.
- Cattaruzza, Marina (2011). "The Making and Remaking of a Boundary – the Redrafting of the Eastern Border of Italy after the two World Wars". The Journal of Modern History. 9 (1). Chicago: University of Chicago Press: 66–86. ISSN 0022-2801. JSTOR 26265925.
- Cipriani, Carlo Cetteo (2016). "Itaalia sõjaline okupatsioon Dalmaatsias 1918–1921" [Italian military occupation in Dalmatia in 1918–1921: the fate of a former part of the Austro-Hungarian Empire]. Eesti sõjaajaloo aastaraamat (in Estonian). 6 (12). Tallinn: Tallinn University Publishing House: 85–116. ISSN 2228-0669.
- Davidonis, Anthony C. (1943). The American Naval Mission in the Adriatic, 1918–1921 (PDF). Washington, DC: United States Department of the Navy. OCLC 1112737551.
- Degan, Vladimir-Đuro (2008). "Pravni aspekti i političke posljedice rimskih ugovora od 18. svibnja 1941. godine" [Legal Aspects and Political Effects of the Rome Treaties of 18 May 1941]. Zbornik radova Pravnog fakulteta u Splitu (in Croatian). 45 (2). Split, Croatia: University of Split: 265–278. ISSN 0584-9063.
- De Grand, Alexander (1978). The Italian Nationalist Association and the Rise of Fascism in Italy. Lincoln, London: University of Nebraska Press. ISBN 978-0-8032-0949-7.
- Diklić, Marjan (2011). "Zadar i Rapallski ugovor (Uz 90. obljetnicu)" [Zadar and the Treaty of Rapallo (On the Occasion of the 90th Anniversary)]. Radovi Zavoda za povijesne znanosti HAZU u Zadru (in Croatian) (53). Zagreb: Croatian Academy of Sciences and Arts: 223–242. ISSN 1330-0474.
- Drinković, Damir (2023). Riječki ljetopis: Rijeka u pisanim izvorima = Annali di Fiume [Rijeka Chronicle: Rijeka in Written Sources] (in English, Croatian, and Italian). Rijeka: Rijeka City Library. ISBN 978-953-8493-00-3.
- Fifield, Russell Hunt (1948). "International Affairs: The Postwar World Map: New States and Boundary Changes". The American Political Science Review. 42 (3). Washington: American Political Science Review: 533–541. doi:10.2307/1949917. ISSN 0003-0554. JSTOR 1949917.
- Gentile, Emilio (2005). The Origins of Fascist Ideology 1918–1925. New York: Enigma Books. ISBN 978-0-9824911-3-3.
- Gentile, Emilio (1990). "Fascism as Political Religion". Journal of Contemporary History. 25 (2). SAGE Publications: 229–251. doi:10.1177/002200949002500204. ISSN 0022-0094. JSTOR 260731.
- Gumbrecht, Hans Ulrich (1996). "I redentori della vittoria: On Fiume's Place in the Genealogy of Fascism". Journal of Contemporary History. 31 (2). Thousand Oaks: SAGE Publications: 253–272. doi:10.1177/002200949603100203. ISSN 0022-0094. JSTOR 261166.
- Hill, Chesney (1934). The Doctrine of "rebus sic stantibus" in International Law. Vol. IX. Columbia: University of Missouri. OCLC 1876470.
- Horel, Catherine (2016). "Fiume-Rijeka, frontieres et identités 1880–1921" [Fiume-Rijeka, Borders and Identities 1880–1921]. Études balkaniques (in French) (2). Sofia: Institute of Balkan Studies and Centre of Tracology at the Bulgarian Academy of Sciences: 282–312. ISSN 0324-1645.
- Hughes-Hallett, Lucy (2013). The Pike: Gabriele D'Annunzio, Poet, Seducer and Preacher of War. London: Alfred A. Knopf. ISBN 978-0-00-721396-2.
- Kernek, Sterling J. (1982). "Woodrow Wilson and National Self-Determination along Italy's Frontier: A Study of the Manipulation of Principles in the Pursuit of Political Interests". Proceedings of the American Philosophical Society. 126 (4). Philadelphia: American Philosophical Society: 243–300. ISSN 0003-049X. JSTOR 0003049X.
- Knox, MacGregor (2007). To the Threshold of Power, 1922/33: Origins and Dynamics of the Fascist and Nationalist Socialist Dictatorships. Vol. I. Cambridge: Cambridge University Press. ISBN 978-0-521-87860-9.
- Krizman, Bogdan (1970). "Vanjskopolitički položaj Kraljevine Srba, Hrvata i Slovenaca godine 1919" [The Position of the Monarchy of Serbs, Croats and Slovenes in the World in 1919]. Časopis za suvremenu povijest (in Croatian). 2 (1). Zagreb: Croatian Institute of History: 23–59. ISSN 0590-9597.
- Lanchester, George Herbert (1950). "1937–38: Major-General Sydney Capel Peck". Institution of Mechanical Engineers.
- Ledeen, Michael (1977). The First Duce: D'Annunzio at Fiume. Baltimore, London: Johns Hopkins University Press. ISBN 978-0-8018-1860-8.
- Lowe, Cedric J.; Marzari, Frank (1975). Italian Foreign Policy 1870–1940. Vol. VIII. London: Routledge. ISBN 978-0-415-27372-5.
- Mack Smith, Denis (1997). Modern Italy: A Political History. New Haven: Yale University Press. ISBN 978-0-300-04342-6.
- MacMillan, Margaret (2002). Paris 1919: Six Months That Changed the World. New York City: Random House Publishing Group. ISBN 9780375760525.
- Mann, Michael (2004). Fascists. Cambridge: Cambridge University Press. ISBN 978-0-521-53855-8.
- Marcuzzi, Stefano (2020). Britain and Italy in the era of the Great War: Defending and Forging Empires. Cambridge: Cambridge University Press. ISBN 978-1-108-92400-9.
- Matijević, Zlatko (2008). "Narodno vijeće Slovenaca, Hrvata i Srba u Zagrebu: Osnutak, djelovanje i nestanak (1918/1919)" [National Council of Slovenes, Croats and Serbs in Zagreb: Founding, Actions and Disappearance (1918/1919)]. Fontes: Izvori Za Hrvatsku Povijest (in Croatian). 14 (1). Zagreb: Croatian State Archives: 35–66. ISSN 1330-6804.
- Merlicco, Giordano (2021). "Between old Austria and new foes: Italy and the Yugoslav project (1917–1918)" (PDF). Istorijski Zapisi. XCIV (1–2). Podgorica: Istorijski institut Crne Gore: 115–138. ISSN 0021-2652.
- Ordasi, Ágnes (2022). "Borderline Syndrome in Fiume". The Hungarian Historical Review. 11 (2). Budapest: Institute of History, Research Centre for the Humanities, Hungarian Academy of Sciences: 387–421. doi:10.38145/2022.2.387. ISSN 2063-8647. JSTOR 27297213.
- Patafta, Daniel (2004). "Promjene u nacionalnoj strukturi stanovništva grada Rijeke od 1918. do 1924. godine" [Changes in the National Structure of the Population of the City of Rijeka from 1918 to 1924]. Časopis za suvremenu povijest (in Croatian). 36 (2). Zagreb: Croatian Institute of History: 683–700. ISSN 0590-9597.
- Patafta, Daniel (2006). "Privremene vlade u Rijeci (listopad 1918.–siječanj 1924.)" [Temporary Governments in Rijeka, October 1918–January 1924]. Časopis za suvremenu povijest (in Croatian). 38 (1). Zagreb: Croatian Institute of History: 197–222. ISSN 0590-9597.
- Pavlović, Srdja (2008). Balkan Anschluss: The Annexation of Montenegro and the Creation of the Common South Slavic State. West Lafayette: Purdue University Press. ISBN 978-1-557-53465-1.
- Pavlowitch, Kosta St. (2003). "The First World War and Unification of Yugoslavia". In Djokic, Dejan (ed.). Yugoslavism: Histories of a Failed Idea, 1918–1992. London: C. Hurst & Co. pp. 27–41. ISBN 1-85065-663-0.
- Perinčić, Tea (2022). "Grad Rijeka u 20. stoljeću: Narodi-nacije, sukobi, granice, migracije" [The City of Rijeka in the 20th Century: Nations, Conflicts, Borders, Migrations]. Povijest U Nastavi (in Croatian). 33 (1). Zagreb: Društvo za hrvatsku povijesnicu: 109–116. ISSN 1334-1375.
- Pizzi, Katia (2001). A City in Search of an Author. London: Sheffield Academic Press. ISBN 9780567244970.
- Prister, Boris (2019). "Spomen-medalja ekspedicije u Rijeku (Medaglia commemorativa della spedizione di Fiume)" [Memorial Medal of the Rijeka Expedition (Medaglia commemorativa della spedizione di Fiume)]. Numizmatičke Vijesti (in Croatian). 61 (72). Zagreb: Croatian Numismatical Society: 170–183. ISSN 0546-9422.
- Ramet, Sabrina P. (2006). The Three Yugoslavias: State-building and Legitimation, 1918–2005. Bloomington: Indiana University Press. ISBN 9780253346568.
- Repe, Božo (2008). "Vloga slovenskih politikov in diplomatov pri določanju meja" [Delimitation of Frontiers – Role of Slovenian Politicians and Diplomats]. Adrias: Zbornik radova Zavoda za znanstveni i umjetnički rad Hrvatske akademije znanosti i umjetnosti u Splitu (in Slovenian) (15). Zagreb: Croatian Academy of Sciences and Arts: 109–117. ISSN 0352-9924.
- Roknić Bežanić, Andrea (2012). "Uspostava i organizacija civilnih i vojnih vlasti u poslijeratnoj Rijeci" [The Establishment and Organization of Civil and Military Government in Postwar Rijeka]. Časopis za povijest Zapadne Hrvatske (in Croatian). 6–7. Rijeka: University of Rijeka: 163–177. ISSN 1846-3223.
- Rudolf, Davorin (2008). "Granice s Italijom u mirovnim ugovorima nakon Prvoga i Drugog svjetskog rata" [Borders With Italy in Peace Treaties Following World War I and World War II]. Adrias: Zbornik radova Zavoda za znanstveni i umjetnički rad Hrvatske akademije znanosti i umjetnosti u Splitu (in Croatian) (15). Zagreb: Croatian Academy of Sciences and Arts: 61–80. ISSN 0352-9924.
- Strčić, Petar (1981). "O Rijeci od 1918. do 1924. godine" [About the Question of Rijeka 1918–1924]. Prispevki za novejšo zgodovino (in Croatian) (21). Ljubljana: Institute of Contemporary History: 129–146. ISSN 0353-0329.
- Tamaro, Attilio (31 May 1919). "The Question of Fiume". The Spectator. London. pp. 9–10. ISSN 0038-6952.
- Tomasevich, Jozo (2002). War and Revolution in Yugoslavia, 1941–1945: Occupation and Collaboration. Stanford, California: Stanford University Press. ISBN 978-0-8047-0857-9.
- Woodhouse, John Robert (1998). Gabriele D'Annunzio: Defiant Archangel. Oxford: Oxford University Press. ISBN 978-0-19-818763-9.
- Zgrablić, Milan (2005). "Poteškoće oko osnivanja obiju bolnica u Sušaku" [Difficulties in Establishing Hospitals in Sušak]. Acta medico-historica Adriatica (in Croatian). 3 (2). Rijeka: Hrvatsko znanstveno društvo za povijest zdravstvene kulture: 223–242. ISSN 1334-4366.
