= Allied occupation of the eastern Adriatic =

Occupation of the eastern Adriatic after World War I

Occupation of the eastern Adriatic
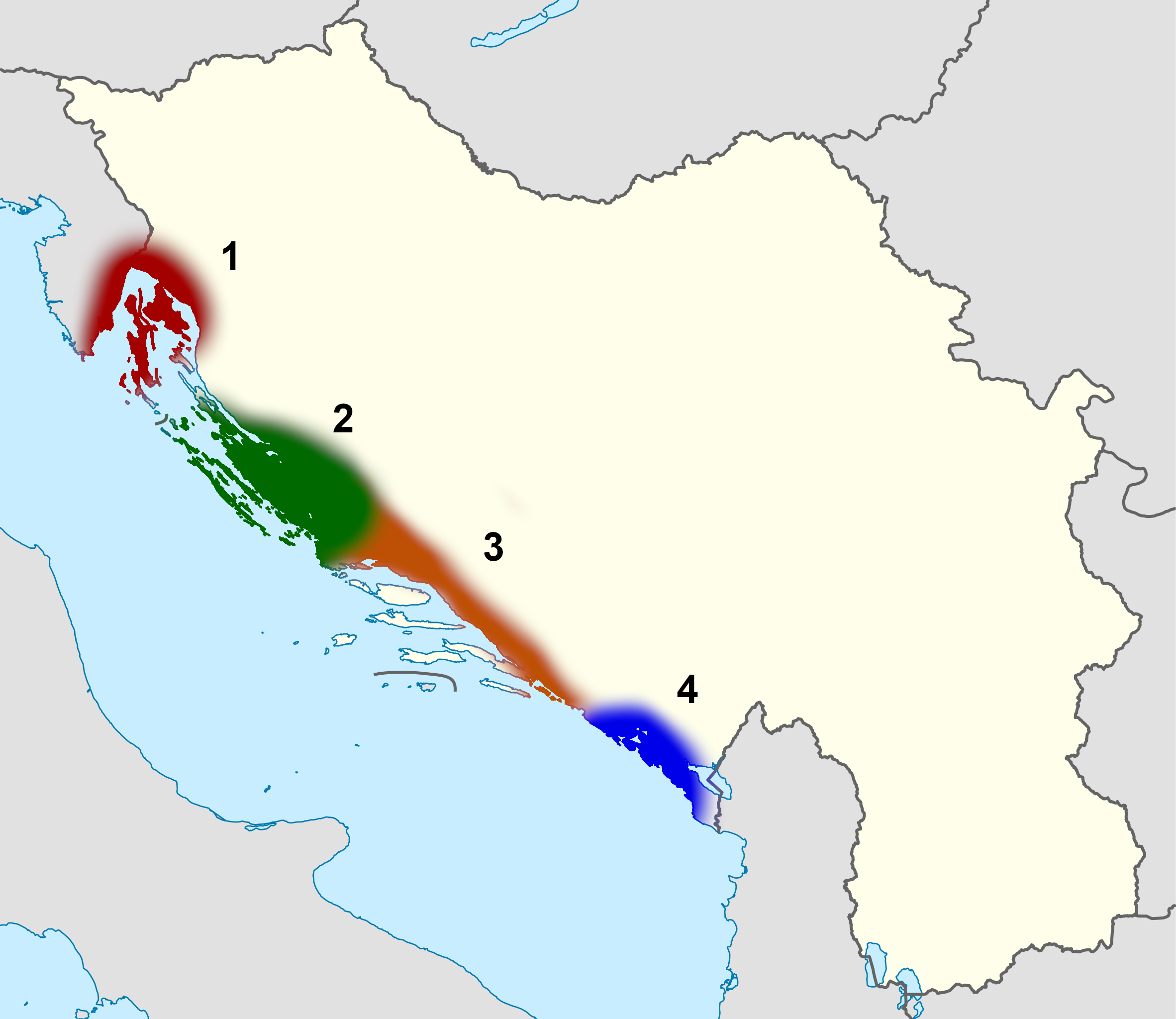
- Approximate locations of zones of occupation 1 British 2 Italian 3 American 4 French
- Operational scope: Occupation
- Commanded by: (United Kingdom of Great Britain and Ireland) British zone: Sydney Capel Peck (Kingdom of Italy) Italian zone: Enrico Millo (United States) American zone: Albert Parker Niblack; Philip Andrews; Rufus F. Zogbaum, Jr. (France) French zone: Louis Caubet; Paul Venel; Mathias Tahon
- Objective: Settlement of territorial claims of the Kingdom of Serbs, Croats and Slovenes and the Kingdom of Italy; Disposal of the Austro-Hungarian Navy ships
- Date: 3 November 1918 – 21 September 1921
- Executed by: Allies of World War I

The occupation of the eastern Adriatic by the Allies of World War I was a military mission that followed the First World War and lasted from November 1918 to September 1921. Naval assets and troops of the United Kingdom, the Kingdom of Italy, France, and the United States were deployed to parts of the territory of former Austria-Hungary, especially the region of Dalmatia, the city of Rijeka, and coastal areas of the Kingdom of Montenegro. The occupation was intended to resolve the disposal of assets of the Austro-Hungarian Navy and the settlement of Italian territorial claims on the eastern coast of the Adriatic Sea. Those claims, largely corresponding to the award made under the Treaty of London used to entice Italy to enter the war on the side of the Allies, conflicted with the territorial claims of the nascent Kingdom of Serbs, Croats and Slovenes (later renamed Yugoslavia) and its predecessor states, as well as the principle of self-determination outlined in the Fourteen Points of the US President Woodrow Wilson.

The Allies divided the eastern Adriatic coast into four zones of occupation. The Italian zone was determined to correspond to the Treaty of London award and centred on Zadar and Šibenik in northern Dalmatia. Central Dalmatia and the city of Split were assigned to the United States. Southern Dalmatia, between Dubrovnik and Kotor, and the coast of Montenegro, became a French zone of occupation. The British were assigned to the Kvarner Gulf in the northern Adriatic, centred on Rijeka. Italy claimed the city based on the Treaty of London and on the principle of self-determination. Littoral areas outside the four zones of occupation were controlled either by Italian forces in Istria or by the Army of the Kingdom of Serbs, Croats and Slovenes (or the Royal Serbian Army before December 1918). All major ports had a military presence from all four allied nations.

The occupation was marked by Italian efforts to pursue territorial claims and conflicts with civilian populations and local authorities in some areas. Otherwise, the local population in Dalmatia generally welcomed the Allies. In ethnically mixed Rijeka, the reception reflected the ethnic composition. The British occupation of Rijeka was affected by the takeover of the city by Gabriele D'Annunzio in September 1919, shortly after Francesco Saverio Nitti replaced Vittorio Emanuele Orlando as the Italy's prime minister and the new government agreed with the British and French that Rijeka should be a city-state. To prevent the implementation of the agreement, D'Annunzio proclaimed the Italian Regency of Carnaro and the Allies retreated from the city. In the French zone, Italy and France came into conflict over Montenegro's future, as well as over support for opposing factions in the January 1919 Christmas Uprising in Montenegro.

The occupation was concluded following the transfer of the remaining Austro-Hungarian naval assets to Italy and the Kingdom of Serbs, Croats and Slovenes, and by the 1920 Treaty of Rapallo, which determined the border between the two countries. The treaty also established the Free State of Fiume in the Rijeka area, prompting D'Annunzio's removal from the city by the Regia Marina.

== Background ==
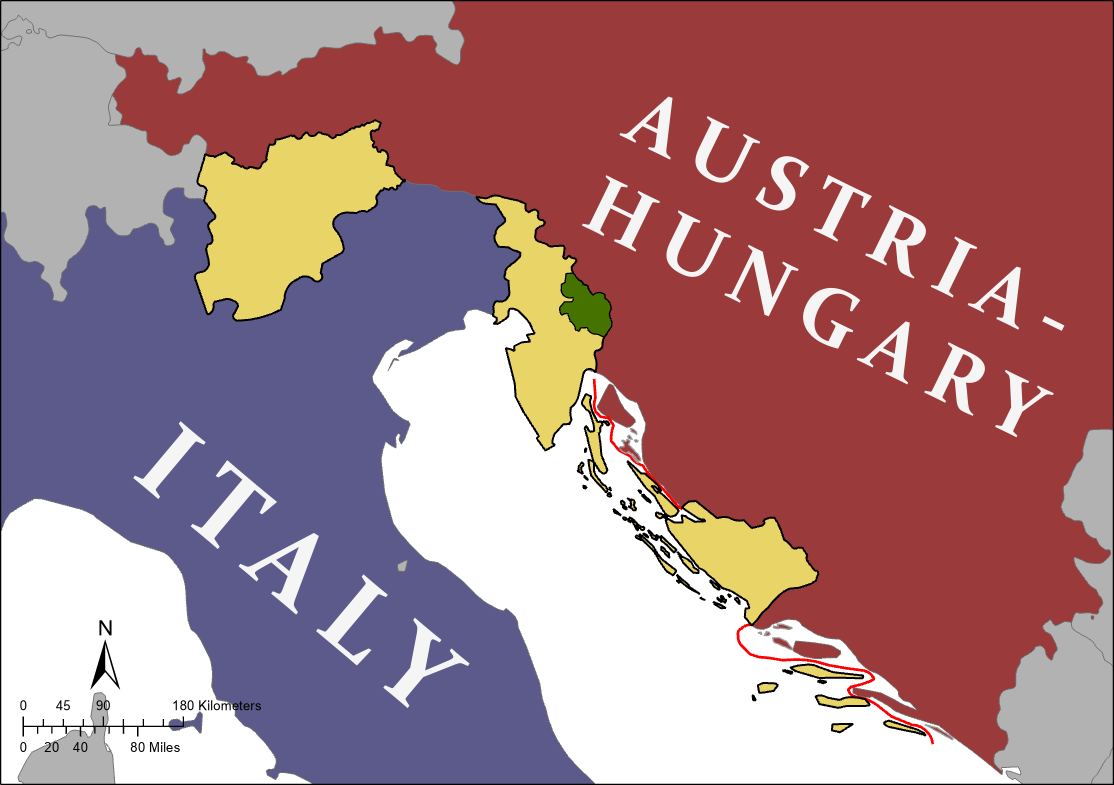
Territories promised to Italy by the London Pact (1915), i.e. Trentino-Alto Adige, the Julian March and Dalmatia (tan), and the Snežnik Plateau area (green). Dalmatia, after the WWI, however, was not assigned to Italy but to Yugoslavia.

In 1915, the Kingdom of Italy entered the First World War on the side of the Entente following the signing of the Treaty of London, which promised Italy territorial gains at the expense of Austria-Hungary. The treaty was opposed by representatives of the South Slavs living in Austria-Hungary, who were organised as the Yugoslav Committee. Following the 3 November 1918 Armistice of Villa Giusti, the Austro-Hungarian surrender, and well ahead of the Paris Peace Conference, Italian troops moved to occupy parts of the eastern Adriatic shore that had been promised to Italy under the Treaty of London. To counter Italian demands, the internationally unrecognised State of Slovenes, Croats and Serbs, a proto-state that was carved from areas of Austria-Hungary populated by the South Slavs, authorised the Yugoslav Committee to represent it abroad. The short-lived state, which would soon seek union with the Kingdom of Serbia to establish the Kingdom of Serbs, Croats and Slovenes, laid a competing claim to the eastern Adriatic coast and islands. This claim was supported with the deployment of the Royal Serbian Army to the area. Major powers did not recognise the new unified state before June 1919.

The Treaty of London's provisions were a major point of dispute between Italy and the remaining Entente powers at the Paris Peace Conference. The chief Italian representatives, Prime Minister Vittorio Emanuele Orlando and foreign minister Sidney Sonnino demanded enforcement of the treaty arguing that possession of the promised territories was vital for Italian security, and called for the annexation of the city of Rijeka (Italian: Fiume) based on the principle of self-determination. Orlando was prepared to abandon claims in Dalmatia, except Zadar (Italian: Zara) and Šibenik (Italian: Sebenico), while insisting on annexing Rijeka. Sonnino held a view that was summarised as "Pact of London plus Fiume", portraying the claim as a matter of Italian national honour.

The British and French governments would not publicly endorse any claims exceeding those the treaty afforded, while privately believing Italy deserved little due to its reserved attitude towards Germany in the early stages of the war. Regarding Dalmatia, the British Prime Minister David Lloyd George supported a free-city status for Zadar and Šibenik only, while the French Prime Minister Georges Clemenceau supported such a status for Zadar only. Clemenceau and Lloyd George were content for the President of the United States Woodrow Wilson to hold in check Italian ambitions in the Adriatic by advocating self-determination for the area under point nine of his Fourteen Points.

Wilson deemed the Treaty of London a symbol of the perfidy of European diplomacy and held it invalid by dint of the legal doctrine of clausula rebus sic stantibus – that the treaty was no longer applicable because there had been fundamental changes in the circumstances in which it was negotiated, namely the dissolution of Austria-Hungary.

== Zones of occupation ==
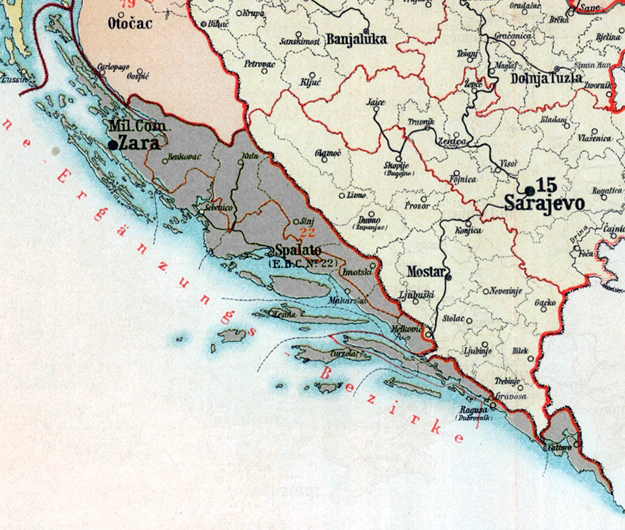
Map of the Austrian Kingdom of Dalmatia

The Naval Commission for the Adriatic was established based on the decision of the Allied Naval Council of the Supreme War Council on 5 November 1918. The commission, composed of admirals delegated by the four powers, was tasked with coordinating the Allied occupation forces. It was also intended to maintain order, normalise civilian life, manage maritime transport, oversee the distribution of the Austro-Hungarian fleet, and deal with other related issues that the Paris Peace Conference had permanently settled. The commission was first convened in Rijeka. Later, it moved to Venice and Rome. Initially, it was chaired by the Italian Rear Admiral Vittorio Molà. He was replaced by Admiral Paolo Thaon di Revel based on a decision of the Allied Naval Council in Paris on the same day.

The commission agreed on zones of occupation of the eastern Adriatic shores. The occupation plan was never fully enforced; only Italy deployed a large force to the area. The assignment of the Italian zone was the result of a fait accompli. Italy interpreted the armistice terms as allowing them to establish the armistice line per the claims laid out in the Treaty of London. Italy had already established a firm foothold in the claimed area by the time the zones were defined in Venice on 16 November, in a meeting of the commission chaired by Revel. Other sources say the zones were defined on 26 November at a commission meeting in Rome. Italy would control northern parts of Dalmatia corresponding to the Dalmatian territory promised under the Treaty of London. The US would control the southern Dalmatian coast, and France would control the coasts of the southernmost part of Dalmatia, the Kingdom of Montenegro and the further south coast of the Principality of Albania. The United Kingdom was to control the Kvarner Gulf.

The former Austro-Hungarian realm of the Kingdom of Dalmatia encompassed the entire Italian and American zones of occupation and a portion of the French zone. In the territory of the Kingdom of Dalmatia as a whole, Croats comprised 80%, Serbs comprised 17%, and Italians comprised 3% of the population. According to the 1910 Austro-Hungarian census, all Dalmatian municipalities had a Slavic majority of 95% or more, except Kotor (Italian: Cattaro) and Zadar. In the former, the Slavic population accounted for 80% of the total, Italians for 1%, German speakers comprised 3% and foreign nationals accounted for more than 11% of the population. The city of Zadar had an Italian majority. Rijeka was ethnically mixed and both sides in the dispute claimed majority in Rijeka, but defined the city limits differently. Italians argued that the city consisted of the former Austro-Hungarian corpus separatum territory only, but the South Slavs argued that the suburb of Sušak should also be accounted for. (Note: According to the 1910 Austro-Hungarian census, 23,283 citizens or nearly 47% of Rijeka's population within the Corpus Separatum were Italian, while Croats and Slovenes accounted for 19,668, or almost 40%. In December 1918, the Italian authorities conducted a census where 62% were registered as Italians, and 23% as Croats or Slovenes. According to Croatian sources, the 1918 census data were collected under duress and falsely recorded. Another census was taken in 1925, indicating 79% of the city's population was Italian. According to a contemporary Yugoslav source, the suburb of Sušak, lying outside the boundaries of the former Corpus Separatum, had a population of 13,214 (of which 11,000 were South Slavs) in 1918. According to Italian historian Attilio Tamaro, the numbers were not contested, but it was disputed if Sušak was an integral part of Rijeka or not. Sušak's population was estimated at 12,000 in 1919.)

== British zone ==
=== End of Austro-Hungarian rule ===
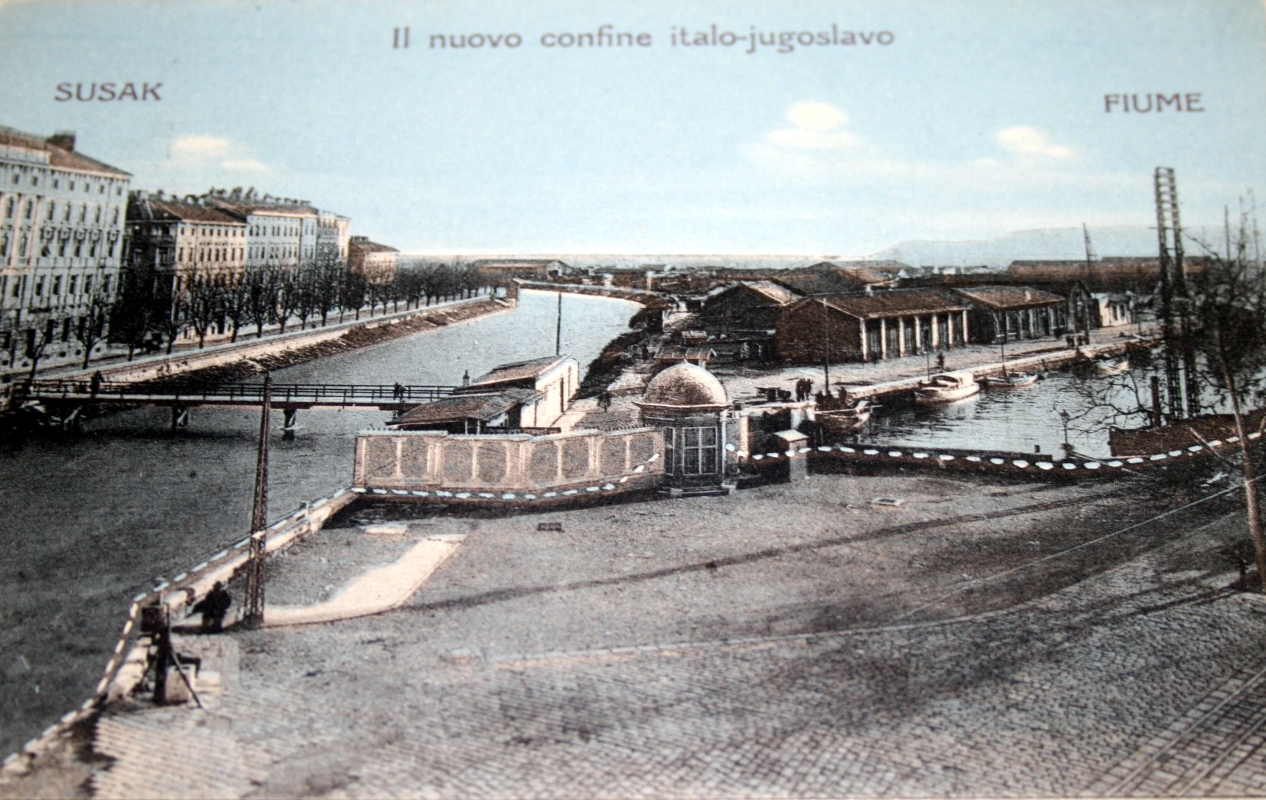
Rječina River separating Rijeka (right) from Sušak (left)

In late October 1918, the governing organ of the State of Slovenes, Croats and Serbs, the Zagreb-based National Council of Slovenes, Croats and Serbs, appointed Rikard Lenac to take over the administration of Rijeka on behalf of the newly proclaimed state. The move was coordinated with the administratively separate suburb of Sušak. The takeover of authority occurred on 29 or 31 October, according to varying sources. Military authority in Rijeka and Sušak was assumed by Lieutenant Colonel Petar Teslić, who commanded eight battalions of the 79th Infantry Regiment of the former Austro-Hungarian Common Army normally based in Otočac, and pro-Yugoslav National Guard volunteers, largely consisting of high-school pupils. Leading ethnic Italians living in the city established the Italian National Council of Fiume (Italian: Consiglio Nazionale delli Italiani di Fiume) and declared the desire to incorporate the city into Italy. They dispatched a delegation to Revel in Venice to request aid. Lenac asked Zagreb to send additional troops as well. There were clashes between Italian and South Slavic communities in the city, each side claiming the city based on the self-determination principle. While Italy said there was an Italian majority in the city within the boundaries of the former Austro-Hungarian Corpus Separatum, the South Slavs said the entire city, including the suburb of Sušak, had a South Slavic majority.

=== Occupation of Rijeka ===
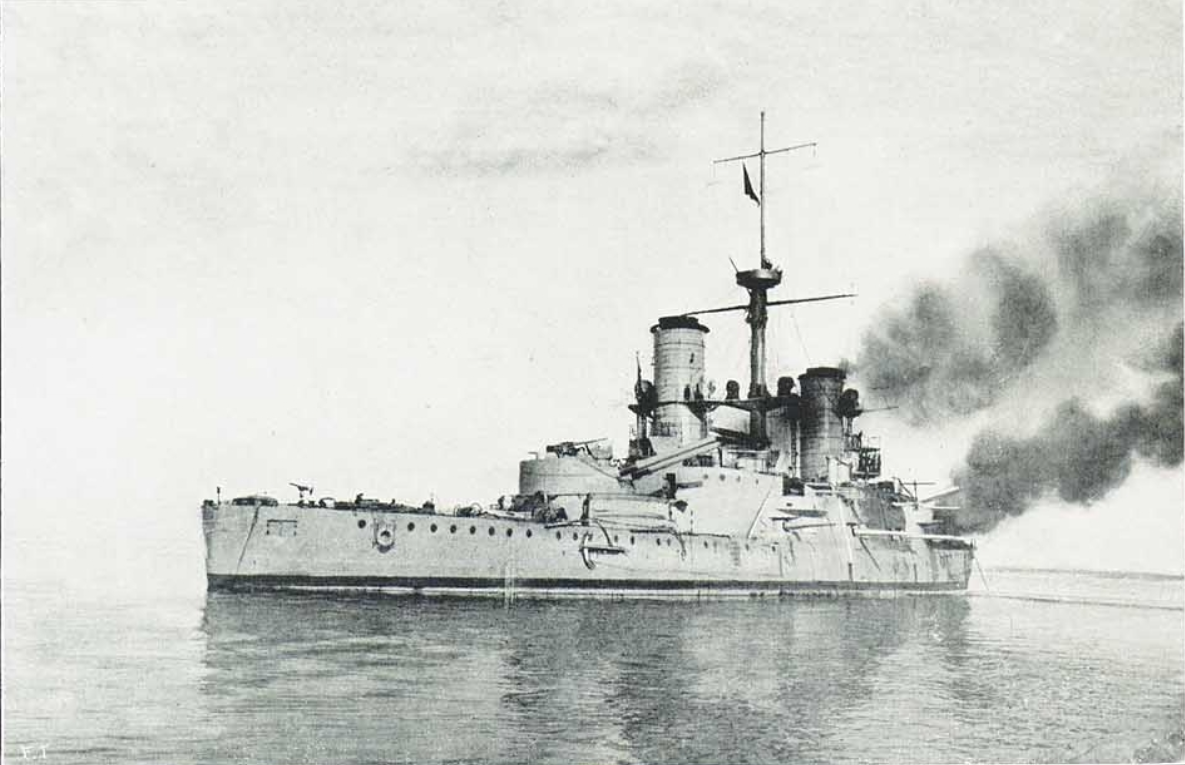
Battleship Emanuele Filiberto was in the first group of Italian ships to arrive to Rijeka.

On 2 November 1918, a group of United States Navy ships sailed into the Port of Rijeka. The next day, they were followed by a French and a British force. Colonel Sydney Capel Peck led the British mission to Rijeka. On the same day, a joint allied command was established in Rijeka, ostensibly to prevent further ethnic violence. On 3 November, the day the armistice was signed, Italian armed forces gained control of much of the nearby Istrian peninsula, including the cities of Trieste, Rovinj (Italian: Rovigno) and Pula (Italian: Pola). The Italian navy arrived in the Port of Rijeka on 4 November; the first group consisted of the battleship Emanuele Filiberto; and the destroyers Francesco Stocco, Vincenzo Giordano Orsini, and Giuseppe Sirtori. On 5 November, the French destroyers Touareg and Sakalave brought further reinforcements.

A 700-strong battalion of the First Yugoslav Volunteer Division led by Lieutenant Colonel Vojin Maksimović arrived from Zagreb on 15 November. Two days later, 16,000 Italian troops led by General Enrico Asinari di San Marzano arrived. The battalion of the First Yugoslav Volunteer Division withdrew from the city, and Teslić's troops were quickly disarmed. Some sources say Maksimović's withdrawal from the city was negotiated and made in exchange for the promise San Marzano's troops would not enter Rijeka but would remain in nearby Opatija. Although neither Rijeka nor Sušak were awarded to Italy under the Treaty of London, Italian authorities justified the deployment by referring to provisions of the armistice allowing occupation of additional territories required for strategic purposes. By early 1919, there were approximately 20,000 Italian troops in Rijeka. The commission discussed the Italian military dominance in the British zone and recommended that the Paris Peace Conference ensure military parity with other allied forces. Italy objected to the recommendation, and the Paris Peace Conference did not act upon it.

On 6 July, the paramilitary Legione "Fiumana" loyal to Italy clashed with French Annam troops in the city, killing 13 people. This action prompted the establishment of an international commission to determine responsibility for the incident. The commission recommended disbanding Legione "Fiumana" and reducing the number of Italian troops in the area to a single battalion as quickly as possible, leaving law enforcement to the British and the US forces. Those recommendations were not implemented, but the 1st Regiment "Granatieri di Sardegna" was withdrawn from the city and moved to Ronchi dei Monfalcone near Trieste on 27 August 1919.

=== D'Annunzio's rule ===
At the Paris Peace Conference, the United States, the United Kingdom, and France rejected Italian claims under the Treaty of London and claims regarding Rijeka. In June 1919, the Italian Orlando-led government was replaced by one led by Francesco Saverio Nitti. The new prime minister wanted to settle diplomatic issues abroad before concentrating on domestic matters. The Italian foreign minister Tommaso Tittoni agreed with the British and French that Rijeka should be a free city under the League of Nations, and that the entirety of Dalmatia should belong to the Kingdom of Serbs, Croats and Slovenes.

To pre-empt an unfavourable settlement of the issue, the Italian nationalist and irredentist Gabriele D'Annunzio set out to Rijeka with approximately 200 veterans on the evening of 11 September. When the column reached Ronchi dei Monfalcone, the "Granatieri di Sardegna" joined it. The now-about 2,500-strong column proceeded towards Rijeka and arrived there the next day. In response to D'Annunzio's arrival, Italian and other allied troops withdrew from the city. D'Annunzio proclaimed the establishment of Italian Regency of Carnaro in the city the same day. His rule continued for fifteen months. In the period, the departure of the Croatian population hastened due to increased looting and violence directed against them in response to the death of the captain of the cruiser Puglia in a clash in Split in July 1920.

== Italian zone ==
=== Occupation of Zadar ===
According to the 1910 census, the city of Zadar was the only district of the Kingdom of Dalmatia that had an Italian majority. The Kingdom of Dalmatia was administered from Zadar where the Diet of Dalmatia and regional government had their seats. In 1910, Zadar had a population of 13,247 and an Italian majority of 70%.

The Italian National Council and the Yugoslav National Council were established by 28 October 1918, competing for control of Zadar. The Italian National Council was led by former mayor Luigi Ziliotto, while the Yugoslav National Council, established by Croats and Serbs, was headed by the Dalmatian vice-governor Josip Tončić-Sorinj. Austro-Hungarian authorities had already been removed from the city on 31 October. That day, the ad-hoc pro-Italian National Guard, led by Antonio Battara and Carlo de Hoeberth, informed disarmed troops in the city barracks that the Italian National Council had taken over the city government. Following the takeover of the barracks, Ziliotto, who had been removed from the position of mayor in 1916 when the central government of Austria-Hungary had dissolved the city council and replaced him with commissioner Mate Škarić, proceeded to the city hall accompanied by deposed council members and removed Škarić from office. In the afternoon, the two national councils agreed on a joint Provisional Committee consisting of Ziliotto, Juraj Biankini, Silvije Alfirević, and Giuseppe Cortelazzo. The Provisional Committee placed the Dalmatian governor Mario Attems under house arrest and requested that he leave Zadar, which he did that night. All Austro-Hungarian insignia were removed from the city streets, and the Italian, Croatian, and Serbian flags were raised at the City Guard building.

On 4 November 1918, three Regia Marina ships set sail from Venice to Zadar to enforce the Italian claim against the city, each carrying a platoon of the Arezzo Infantry Brigade. Two of the three ships collided en route and turned back, leaving the torpedo boat 55 AS to continue alone. It arrived in Zadar at 2:30 p.m. and 66 troops disembarked 15 minutes later, a few minutes before the armistice with Austria-Hungary was scheduled to come into effect. Upon arrival, the commanding officer of 55 AS, Felice de Boccard, declared he had arrived on the authority of the Entente and as an ally and in the name of the king of Italy. Both ethnic Italians and Croats welcomed him. The torpedo boat 68 PN and the destroyer Audace arrived at Zadar on 5 and 7 November, respectively. Various sources report that the Serbian and Croatian flags were removed from Zadar on 8 or 11 November. Biankini was placed under house arrest and then exiled from the city. In his speeches, Ziliotto incited hatered against non-Italian population of Zadar and declared he would destroy the city if it was not awarded to Italy by the Paris Peace Conference. There were rumours in the city that the Slavic population will be forcibly deported.

=== The first governorate of Dalmatia ===
On 4 November, another group of Italian vessels departed from Brindisi and occupied the islands of Vis (Italian: Lissa), Korčula (Italian: Curzola), Mljet (Italian: Melada), and Lastovo (Italian: Lagosta). By the end of 1918, Italian troops occupied the Dalmatian coast between and including Zadar and Šibenik, and the hinterland extending to Knin (Italian: Tenin) and Drniš (Italian: Dernis). They also occupied the islands of Hvar (Italian: Lesina) and Pag (Italian: Pago). On 19 November, General Armando Diaz appointed Vice Admiral Enrico Millo the governor of the newly established Governorate of Dalmatia. The appointment was made possible by an Italian government decree of the same day. The government relied on its wartime powers and authorised the governor to issue legislative decrees. The governorate's seat was in Šibenik until January 1919, when it was moved to Zadar. The entire zone came under Italian control on 20 February 1919. The islands of Rab (Italian: Arbe) and Cres (Italian: Cherso) further north also came under Italian occupation.

Forces under Millo's control initially consisted of the Savona Infantry Brigade, several hundred Carabinieri and customs guards, and two battalions of marines. Millo requested reinforcements and received elements of the 24th Infantry Division "Pinerolo". Hoping to receive aircraft under his command, Millo ordered construction of an airbase near Zemunik Donji. The reinforcements brought the number of Italian troops deployed in the Italian zone and elsewhere along the eastern Adriatic coast to 29,000 by July 1919. Still, later in the year, the force was reduced to about 15,000, and 12,000 in mid-1920. Millo's requests for reinforcements were motivated by the possibility of a conflict with the army of the newly established Kingdom of Serbs, Croats and Slovenes, or the hostile population. The reduction of the number of troops was caused by the Italian government's decision to reduce military expenses. The local non-Italian population often expressed dissatisfaction with the Italian army presence, and several minor clashes occurred in 1919. Aiming to repeat his takeover of Rijeka, on 14 November 1919, D'Annunzio led an expedition to Zadar whereupon Millo took D'Annunzio's troops under his command, promising not to abandon Dalmatia.

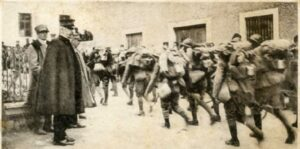
Enrico Millo inspects the Italian troops arriving in Šibenik (1918)

There were frequent deportations of the non-Italian population by the Italian forces. Millo suppressed national liberties, and authorities in the Italian zone systematically harassed non-Italians with methods including physical assaults and confiscation of ration cards. Non-Italian magistrates, physicians, teachers, and priests were particularly targeted to replace them with ethnic Italians. To reduce the potential for travel to the zone, the occupation authorities made false reports of smallpox outbreaks. Most of the deported persons and those fleeing ethnic persecution went to the American zone. Such practices by Italian authorities largely ceased after Nitti replaced Orlando as Prime Minister in June 1919.

== American zone ==
=== Provincial government ===
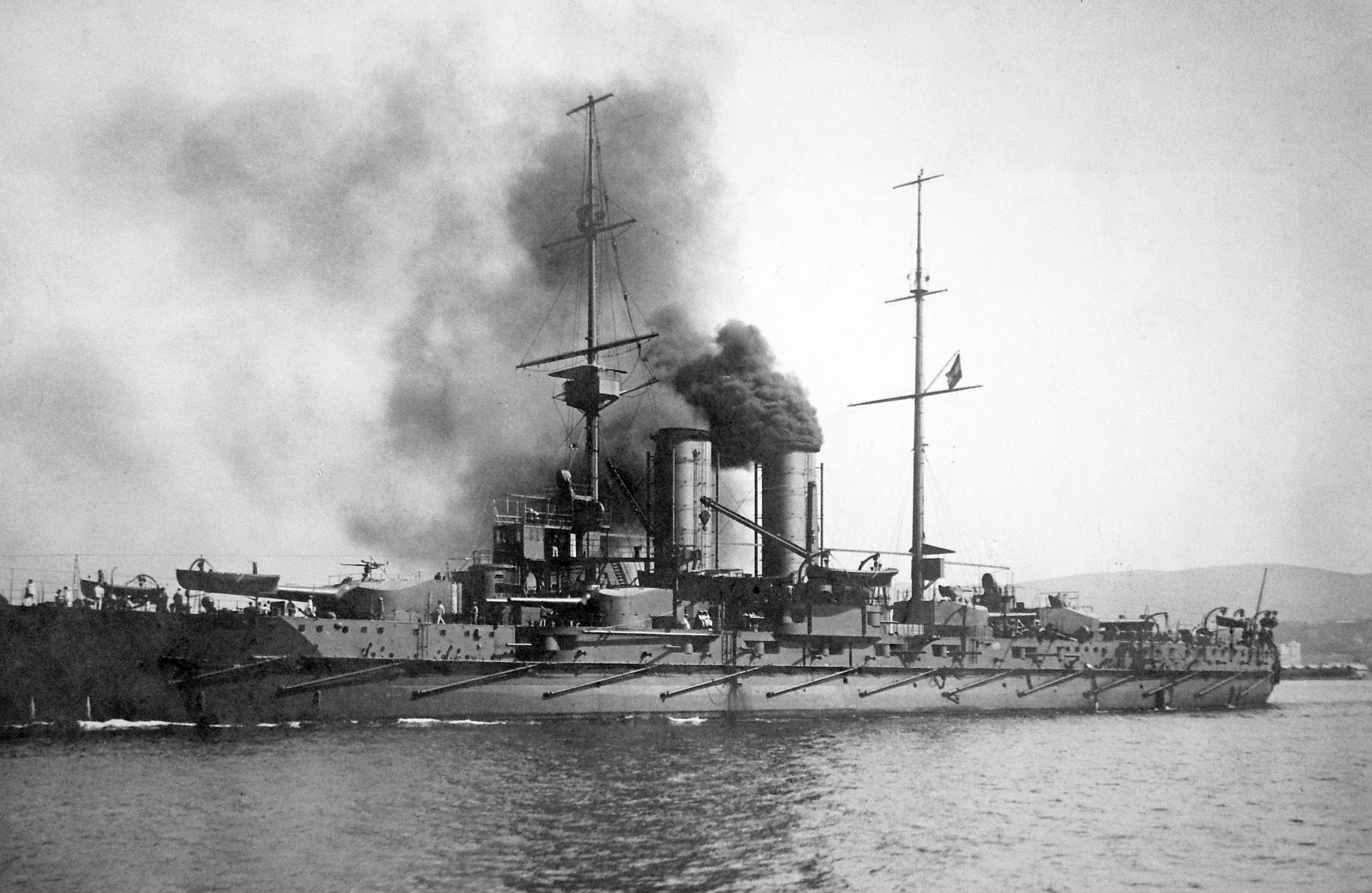
SMS Zrínyi was among Austro-Hungarian ships kept during the occupation pending distribution

The American zone of occupation extended between the Italian and French zones; it lay between Cape Planka and the island of Šipan (Italian: Giuppana) north-west of Dubrovnik (Italian: Ragusa). The US presence was confined mainly to the city of Split (Italian: Spalato), while the armed forces of the Kingdom of Serbs, Croats and Slovenes controlled the rest of the coast in the zone. Italy successfully lobbied for British support for the potential Italian occupation of Split. Revel formally requested inter-allied occupation of Split on 14 November, a few days before the city was included in the American zone.

Austro-Hungarian government bodies had already been removed from the city in late October, and the National Council of Slovenes, Croats and Serbs appointed the provincial government of Dalmatia in Split. The provincial government consisted of Ivo Krstelj, Josip Smodlaka, and Vjekoslav Škarica; and deputies Prvislav Grisogono, Uroš Desnica, and Jerko Machiedo. In early 1919, General Miloš Vasić arrived in Split as the appointed delegate of the Government of the Kingdom of Serbs, Croats and Slovenes to the provincial government of Dalmatia. Before the arrival of the allied navies, public safety in Split, which was affected by shortages of food and coal, had been entrusted to 200 pro-Yugoslav National Guard volunteers organised into three companies. Because the US forces in Dalmatia were tasked with promoting Wilson's policy of self-determination, the US Navy protected and assisted the provincial government.

=== Arrival of the Allies in Split ===
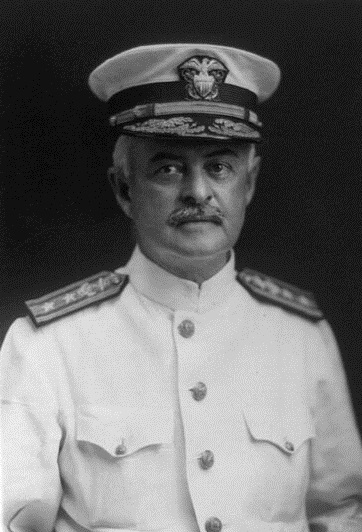
Rear Admiral Philip Andrews was the commanding officer of the American zone of occupation.

On 9 November, the first French vessels arrived in Split. The destroyers Touareg and Sakalave sailed into the Port of Split for a day and were followed by the seaplane carrier Foudre. The population welcomed the French ships. At the same time, proponents of the Italian annexation of Dalmatia hoisted Italian flags in the port, which led to civil unrest and conflict between the city's pro-Italian minority and its anti-Italian majority, and a gathered crowd forcefully removed the flags. An Italian torpedo boat sailed to the town, but it had to anchor in the port because nobody would receive its mooring lines.

The Austro-Hungarian battleships Radetzky and Zrínyi sailed from Pula, and reached Split on 12 November to await surrender to Rear Admiral William H. G. Bullard. Bullard instructed Lieutenant Commander Edward Hazlett to go to Split with 200 troops and take control of the battleships. Sixteen US submarine chasers arrived in Split to accept the surrender, following which all but three proceeded to Šibenik. The two battleships hoisted US flags on 20 November. On the same day, a detachment of the Royal Serbian Army arrived by boat via Metković. The troops, led by Major Stojan Trnokopović, were accommodated in Gripe Fortress. By early 1919, the regular Army of the Kingdom of Serbs, Croats and Slovenes garrisoned the coastal settlements of Split, Trogir (Italian: Traù), and Omiš with a battalion in each, and one company was stationed in the inland town of Sinj.

Numerous allied ships made port calls in Split. By January 1919, those included Foudre, and the French destroyers Bambara, Arabe, Hova, Sénégalais, and Janissaire, and the Arabis-class sloop Altair. In the same period, calls to the Port of Split were made by the Italian ships Carlo Mirabello, Alessandro Poerio, and Puglia, as well as US Navy's USS Israel. On 15 December, HMS Sheldrake was the first Royal Navy ship to arrive. By January 1919, it was followed by HMS Lowestoft and HMS Veronica. In February 1919, USS Olympia arrived in Split with Rear Admiral Philip Andrews aboard. USS Olympia took the role of the lead ship of the US forces, with USS Pittsburgh filling in when Olympia was not in port. Andrews took over the command of the US Naval Forces in the Eastern Mediterranean from Rear Admiral Albert Parker Niblack on 26 March. Following Andrews's arrival, the US Navy rented a Katalinić family residential building in the port as office premises, and another house as a residence for Andrews and his wife. US Navy officers also opened a YMCA in the present-day building of the Split Archaeological Museum. British sailors occasionally played football matches against Hajduk Football Club. The United States financed the repair of roads, telegraph lines, storage facilities, buildings, and sports grounds used by the US Navy.

=== Civil unrest ===
The civil unrest persisted during the Allied occupation. Friction arose during the distribution of food and travel documents from Puglia because only the non-Italian population encountered real or perceived difficulties. There were occasional conflicts between Italian sailors, specifically the crew of Puglia, and the city's non-Italian population. Typical provocations involved hoisting of the flag of the Kingdom of Serbs, Croats and Slovenes in the port with assembled citizens saluting the flag while shouting insults to Italy. In response, Italian sailors and officers would often engage in verbal conflicts with the citizens. This prompted Niblack to declare a ban on public gatherings, singing of patriotic songs and flag-waving.

On 24 February 1919, a conference was convened in Split to examine allegations of persecution of the city's Italian minority presented in the Italian press. Bullard and Niblack attended the conference on behalf of the United States; Admiral Umberto Cagni and Rear Admiral Ugo Rombo on behalf of Italy; Rear Admiral Jean Ratyé on behalf of France; and Admiral Edward Buxton Kiddle representing the UK; and representatives of the city government were also present. At the conference, Rombo proposed landing a large Italian force to quell the civil unrest, but Niblack, who held the Italian navy and propaganda responsible, opposed the idea. The conference agreed on inter-allied patrols to ensure order in Split. The inter-allied patrols initially consisted of one officer, one petty officer and three enlisted men drawn from each allied navy, one soldier from the armed forces of the Kingdom of Serbs, Croats and Slovenes and one city police officer. Later, the patrols were reduced in strength by two-thirds as the situation gradually calmed. In addition to the allied patrols, the local police, consisting of 65 officers supplemented by the National Guard militia, maintained order in the city. Initially, the National Guard were unreliable and even participated in looting, but they became an effective police auxiliary force by early 1919.

=== Conflict in Trogir ===
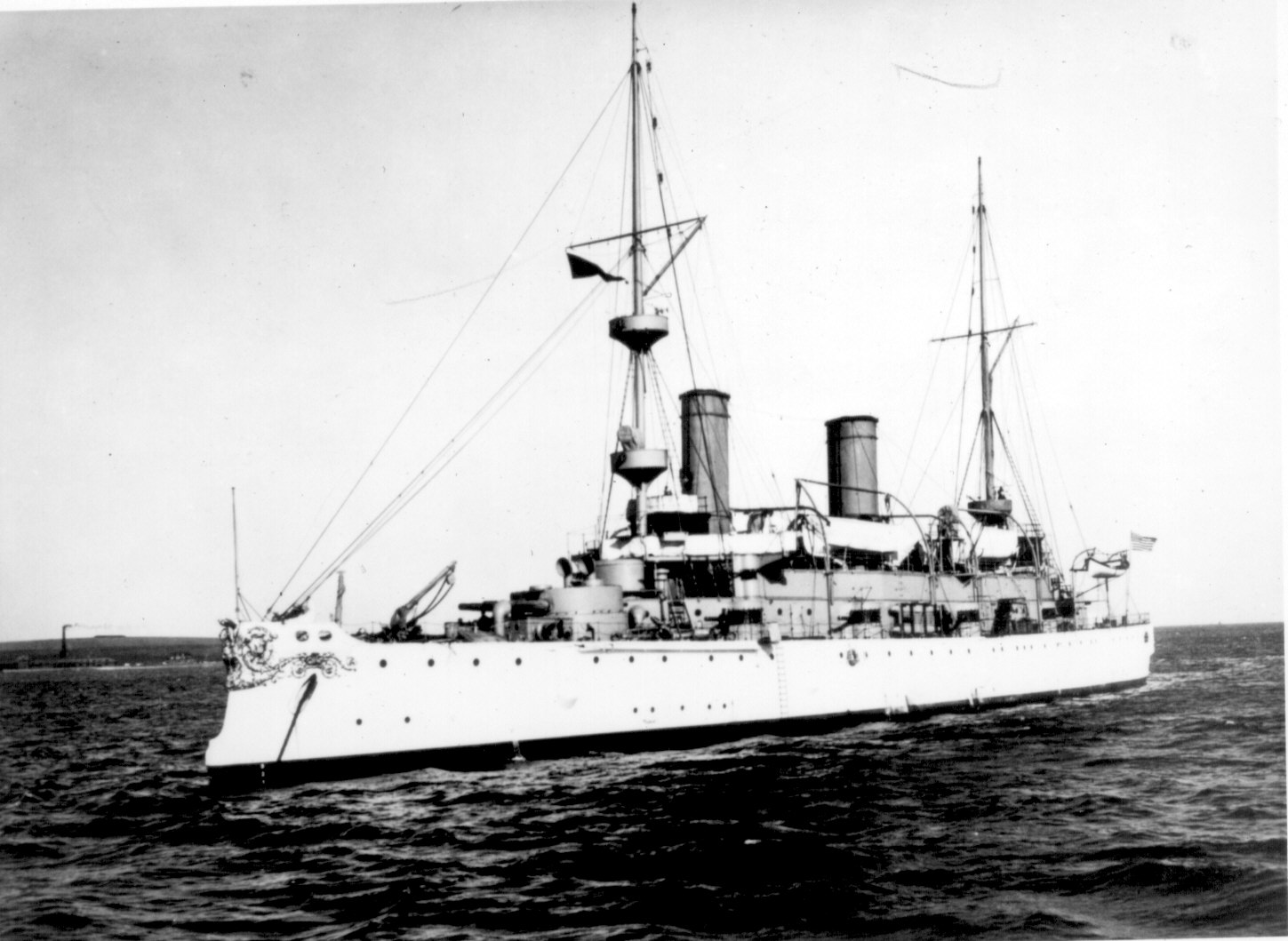
USS Olympia served as the command ship in Split

D'Annunzio's takeover of Rijeka inspired a group of Italian officers to attempt the same in Trogir. On 23 September 1919, Count Nino Fanfogna led 200 Italian soldiers into the town. After a brief skirmish, the attackers disarmed the town garrison maintained by the Kingdom of Serbs, Croats and Slovenes. The government in Belgrade sent a protest to the Paris Peace Conference, while the provincial government of Dalmatia and Vasić complained to Andrews. He sent USS Olympia and USS Cowell under Captain David French Boyd, Jr. to Trogir.

Upon arrival, 100 US sailors and officers landed and took positions between Fanfogna and the troops defending Trogir. Boyd demanded Fanfogna's troops leave the town, giving them a two-hour ultimatum. They complied with Boyd's demand, withdrawing to Zadar. Andrews blamed both sides for the conflict, claiming the Italian force, inspired by D'Annunzio, wanted war, as did Lieutenant Colonel Milan Plesničar of the Army of the Kingdom of Serbs, Croats and Slovenes stationed in Split.

== French zone ==
=== Landings in Kotor ===
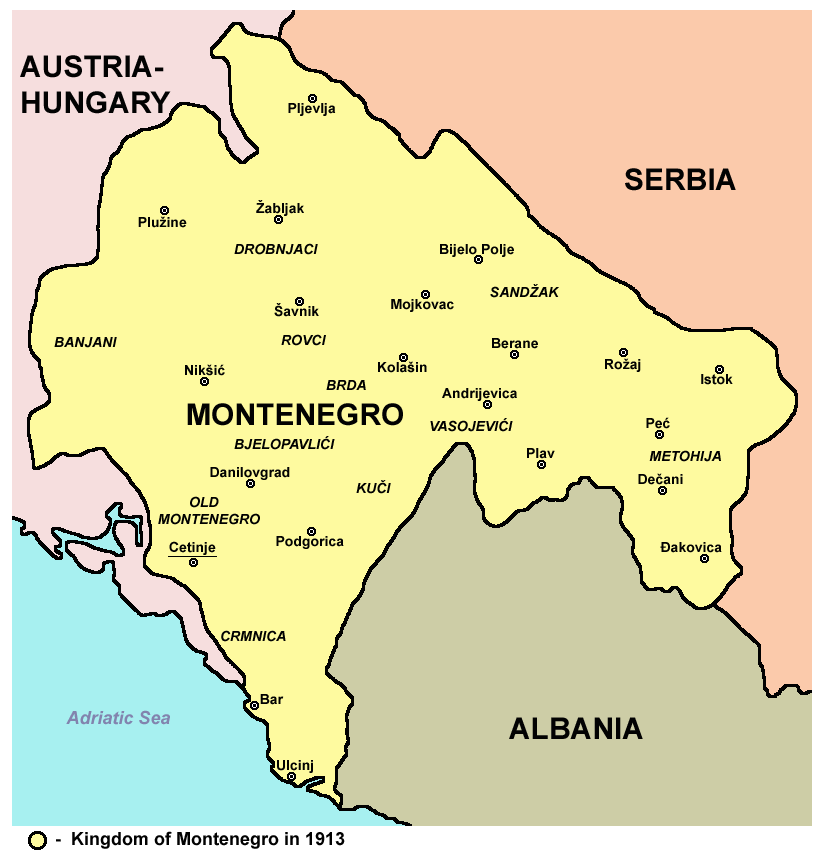
Adriatic coast of the Kingdom of Montenegro was included in the French zone of occupation.

On 10 November, the French, British, and Italian navies sailed into the Austro-Hungarian Navy base in Kotor and Rear Admiral Louis Caubet of France took command of the city in the name of the Allies. The following day, three US Navy submarine chasers also arrived. By 15 November, Italy had deployed two battalions of soldiers to the area. Local authorities protested against the landing of Italian troops, declaring their intention to resist such a move if Italy were to deploy troops alone ashore. In turn, the Allies asked the Italians not to proceed with the landing, but the request was declined. Italy deployed the 137th Infantry Regiment "Barletta", which was led by Major General Demetrio Carbone, to Kotor and the 1st Infantry Regiment "San Giusto" to Bar. Italy also garrisoned the town of Ulcinj. To preserve the appearance of joint landing and prevent a clash, the Allies assigned some sailors to disembark with the Italian soldiers. To avoid the landing appearing to be an exclusively Italian occupation, Caube asked the landing forces to proceed in small, unobtrusive groups, but instead, the Italians held a ceremony with a prominent display of Italian flags and the playing of the Italian national anthem.

On 18 November, Italian transports brought in a further 3,000 troops and a battalion of the United States Army. The American battalion belonged to the 332nd Infantry Regiment, which had been attached to the Italian army since its defeat in the 1917 Battle of Caporetto. This had been intended to enhance the Italians' defensive capabilities and boost morale. The regiment remained under Italian command following the armistice, and its 2nd Battalion was sent to Kotor. US sources concluded that the Italian landings in the Bay of Kotor were designed to saturate the area with Italian troops, thereby gaining a politically dominant position in the region. The declared purpose of allied deployments to the Bay of Kotor was to secure the Austro-Hungarian naval base in Kotor.

=== Advance to Cetinje ===
Italy supported Montenegrin independence, viewing the prospective unified South Slavic state as a threat to its interests in the Balkans and the Adriatic. Italy exploited the Montenegrin question to extract concessions from Serbia. Carbone deployed a force to capture the nearby Montenegrin capital Cetinje on 23 November. His action was designed in line with Italian government policy of supporting Montenegrin independence in the immediate aftermath of the war and following contested elections for the Podgorica Assembly needed to decide on unification with Serbia. To capture Cetinje, he used two companies of the 332nd Infantry Regiment and two smaller Italian units. While en route, local officials approached Major Scanlon, the commanding officer of the two US companies, and explained the political situation to him. In response, Scanlon turned the US troops back to Kotor, leaving the Italians to proceed towards Cetinje. Upon reaching the Montenegrin border, the Italian troops clashed with a Serbian unit blocking the route and were forced to turn back. Carbone planned another attempt to capture Cetinje but was dissuaded following a heated discussion of the issue between Ratyé and Revel in Rome on 26–29 November. The French favoured Serbian (subsequently Kingdom of Serbs, Croats and Slovenes) control of Montenegro, and facilitated the deployment of 3,000 pro-Serbian Montenegrin troops in the area. The French-trained and supported troops included about 400 to be deployed in Kotor and 500 in Dubrovnik. A day after the proclamation of the Kingdom of Serbs, Croats and Slovenes on 2 December, Sonnino ordered the withdrawal of all Italian forces from Kotor. The order was later modified to allow some of the troops to remain.

On 3 January 1919, pro-independence Greens, a faction in the Montenegrin Christmas Uprising, approached Brigadier General Paul Venel, who had replaced Caubet as the French commanding officer in the zone, requesting the Allies to occupy Cetinje and deny it to the forces of Kingdom of Serbs, Croats and Slovenes. Venel declined, prompting the Italian command in Montenegro to criticise the French for their bias. On 5 January, Venel sent French and American troops, and troops belonging to the newly proclaimed Kingdom of Serbs, Croats and Slovenes to Cetinje, taking control of the city two days later. At the same time, he intervened in an Italian effort to regain control of the village of Njeguši from the Greens. Carbone personally led Italian and US troops. Venel ordered the Italians to stop their advance, while the US troops were allowed to proceed to the objective. Although he was acting on instructions from the commander of the Allied Army of the Orient General Louis Franchet d'Espèrey, Venel was relieved of command in February 1919 after further protests by the Italians and the Montenegrin government in exile. Venel was replaced by General Mathias Tahon.

=== Handover of the Austro-Hungarian ships ===
The US troops left Montenegro in early 1919, while the French and the Italians limited their occupation to coastal areas of Bar and Ulcinj, the town of Virpazar on the shore of Lake Skadar, and Kotor at the southernmost tip of Dalmatia at the time, on the orders of d'Espèrey in April 1919. The remainder of Montenegro was left for the Army of the Kingdom of Serbs, Croats and Slovenes to occupy. French troops left Bar and Virpazar in March 1920, while the Italian troops remained there until the middle of 1920. A portion of the Austro-Hungarian fleet stationed in Kotor was handed over to the Navy of the Kingdom of Serbs, Croats and Slovenes. The transfer was settled by the Treaty of Saint-Germain-en-Laye providing for the transfer eight 250t-class torpedo boats, four older Kaiman-class torpedo boats as well as a number of auxiliary and obsolete vessels.

== Aftermath ==
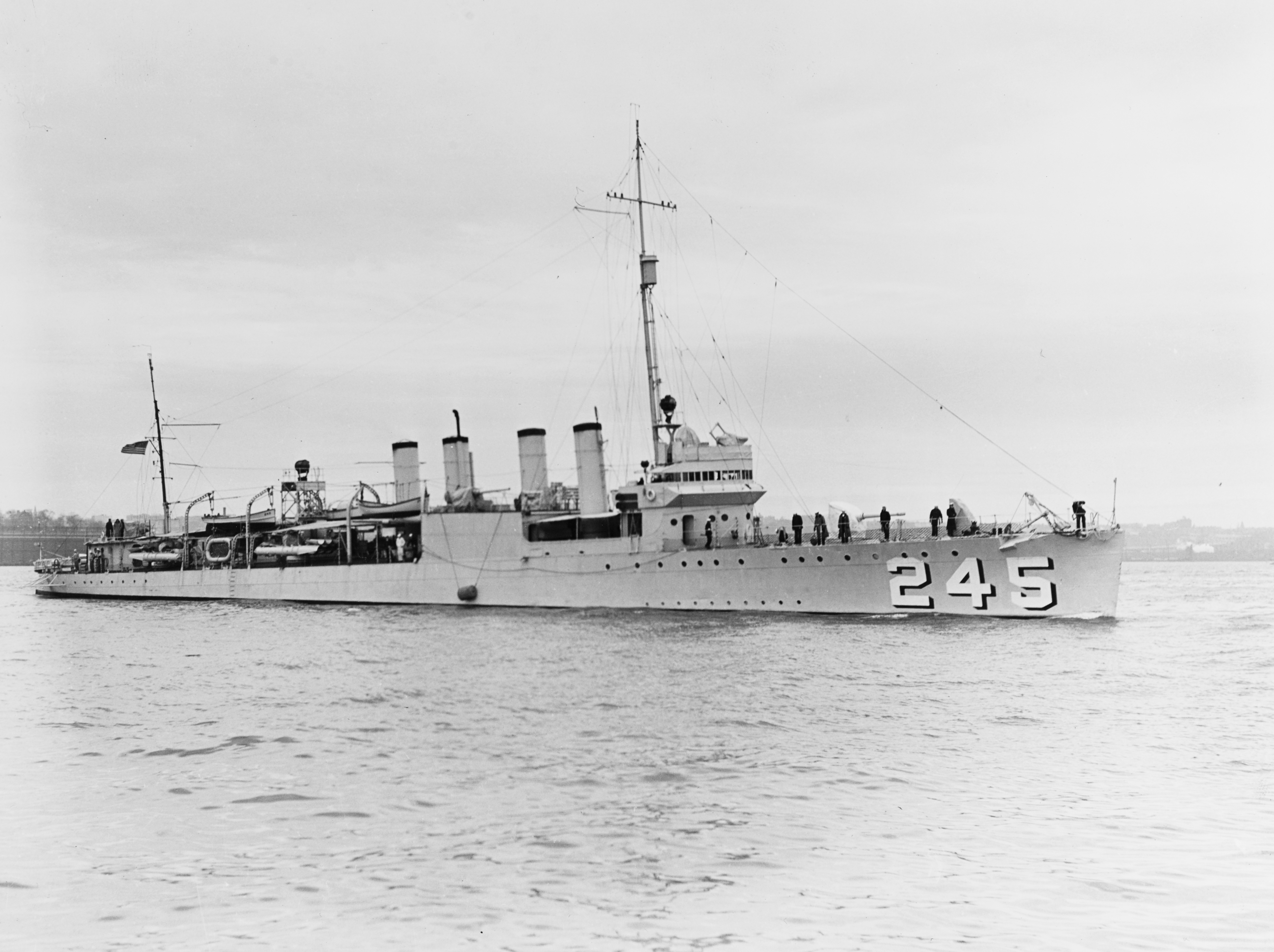
Departure of USS Reuben James from Split marked the end of the allied occupation of the eastern Adriatic.

In June 1920, Nitti's government was replaced by a cabinet led by Giovanni Giolitti, who sought to focus more on domestic issues and resolve foreign policy matters promptly. The Kingdom of Serbs, Croats and Slovenes sought to gain unobstructed access to Adriatic ports for commercial purposes. It hoped for US assistance until Warren G. Harding and the Republican Party won the 1920 US presidential election. On 12 November, delegations of the two countries met in Rapallo and concluded a treaty on mutual borders. Italy received Istria, while the Kingdom of Serbs, Croats and Slovenes received Dalmatia, excluding Zadar and several smaller islands. It was decided that Rijeka and its immediate surroundings would become the Free State of Fiume.

In response to the signing of the Treaty of Rapallo, the Italian Regency of Carnaro proclaimed a state of war. Still, the Italian Navy drove D'Annunzio from Rijeka in an intervention known as Bloody Christmas. Military rule persisted in the Italian zone until the end of December 1920, when a special civilian commissioner was appointed in Zadar, the seat of the Province of Zara, in the aftermath of the treaty. All allied troops left the French zone in December when the French left Kotor. The Treaty of Rapallo, along with the death of Nicholas I of Montenegro a few months later, marked the end of Italian support for Montenegrin resistance against the Kingdom of Serbs, Croats and Slovenes.

On 7 November, the US Navy towed Radetzky and Zrínyi to Šibenik and handed the ships to the Regia Marina. Although this completed the naval aspect of the US mission to the region, the United States Department of State requested that the navy remain in Split until Italian vessels withdrew from the city and Italian troops withdrew from the Italian zone of occupation. The Adriatic Committee convened for the final time on 31 January 1921 to wind down its operations. On 26 April, Andrews left Split aboard USS Olympia. The US mission was concluded on 29 September 1921 as USS Reuben James, which was commanded by Rufus F. Zogbaum, Jr. as the senior officer in the Adriatic, sailed out of Split.

== Sources ==
- Die Ergebnisse der Volkszählung vom 31. Dezember 1910 in den im Reichsrate vertretenen Königreichen und Ländern: Die Bevölkerung nach der Gebürtigkeit, Religion und Umgangssprache in Verbindung mit dem Geschlechte, nach dem Bildungsgrade und Familienstande; die körperlichen Gebrechen; die soziale Gliederung der Haushaltungen; 2. Heft; Tabellen [The Results of the Census of 31 December 1910 in the Kingdoms and Countries Represented in the Imperial Council: The Population by Birth, Religion and Spoken Language in Conjunction with Gender, by Level of Education and Marital Status; Physical Disabilities; the Social Structure of Households; Volume 2; Tables] (in German). Vienna: K.K. Hof- und Staatsdruckerei. 1914. OCLC 801799612.
- Banac, Ivo (1984). The National Question in Yugoslavia: Origins, History, Politics. Ithaca: Cornell University Press. ISBN 0-8014-1675-2.
- Bartulović, Željko (2000). "Sušak u odnosima Kraljevine SHS i Italije 1918-1925" [Sušak in the Relations Between the Kingdom of Serbs, Croats and Slovenes and the Kingdom of Italy (1918–1925)]. Zbornik Pravnog fakulteta u Zagrebu (in Croatian). 50 (6). Zagreb: University of Zagreb: 957–988. ISSN 0350-2058.
- Bartulović, Željko (2013). "Talijanska okupacija Sušaka 1918. – 1923." [Italian Occupation of Sušak 1918–1923] (PDF). In Jurković, Ivan (ed.). Bertošin zbornik: Zbornik u čast Miroslava Bertoše [Bertoša's Proceedings: Proceedings in Honour of Miroslav Bertoša] (PDF) (in Croatian). Vol. 3. Pula: Juraj Dobrila University of Pula. pp. 159–178. ISBN 978-953-7498-69-6.
- Batović, Ante; Kasalo, Branko (2021). "Great Britain and the Adriatic Question after World War I". In Bralić, Ante; Kasalo, Branko (eds.). The Eastern Adriatic Between the Collapse of the Habsburg Monarchy and the Creation of New States. Zadar: University of Zadar. pp. 299–330. ISBN 978-953-331-341-2.
- Becherelli, Alberto (2016). "Montenegro betrayed: The Yugoslav unification and the controversial inter-allied occupation". Balkan Studies (51). Thessaloniki: Institute for Balkan Studies: 69–104. ISSN 2241-1674.
- Bralić, Ante (2006). "Zadar u vrtlogu propasti Habsburške Monarhije (1917. – 1918.)" [Zadar During the Whirlwind of the Demise of the Habsburg Monarchy (1917–1918)]. Časopis za suvremenu povijest (in Croatian). 38 (1). Zagreb: Croatian Institute of History: 243–266. ISSN 0590-9597.
- Burgwyn, H. James (1997). Italian Foreign Policy in the Interwar Period 1918–1940. Westport: Praeger Publishers. ISBN 9780275948771.
- Carteny, Andrea (2015). "Italy, End of the Great War and the Union of Montenegro with Serbia: Details from Italian Documentation". In Rudić, Srđan; Biagini, Antonello (eds.). Serbian-Italian Relations: History and Modern Times: Collection of Works. Belgrade: Institute of History Belgrade & Sapienza University of Rome. pp. 183–198. ISBN 9788677431099.
- Cipriani, Carlo Cetteo (2016). "Itaalia sõjaline okupatsioon Dalmaatsias 1918–1921" [Italian military occupation in Dalmatia in 1918–1921: the fate of a former part of the Austro-Hungarian Empire]. Eesti sõjaajaloo aastaraamat (in Estonian). 6 (12). Tallinn: Tallinn University Publishing House: 85–116. ISSN 2228-0669.
- Cukrov, Mladen (2013). "Admiral Philip Andrews u Splitu" [Allied Peacekeeping Mission in Split After the First World War and the Role of the U.S. Admiral Philip Andrews]. Kulturna baština (in Croatian). 39 (1). Split: Društvo prijatelja kulturne baštine: 97–112. ISSN 0351-0557.
- Davidonis, Anthony C. (1943). The American Naval Mission in the Adriatic, 1918–1921 (PDF). Washington, DC: United States Department of the Navy. OCLC 1112737551.
- Diklić, Marjan (2011). "Zadar i Rapallski ugovor (Uz 90. obljetnicu)" [Zadar and the Treaty of Rapallo (On the Occasion of the 90th Anniversary)]. Radovi Zavoda za povijesne znanosti HAZU u Zadru (in Croatian) (53). Zagreb: Croatian Academy of Sciences and Arts: 223–242. ISSN 1330-0474.
- Drinković, Damir (2023). Riječki ljetopis: Rijeka u pisanim izvorima = Annali di Fiume [Rijeka Chronicle: Rijeka in Written Sources] (in English, Croatian, and Italian). Rijeka: Rijeka City Library. ISBN 978-953-8493-00-3.
- Gabriel, Ralph H. (1944). "American Experience with Military Government". The American Historical Review. 49 (4). Oxford: Oxford University Press: 630–643. doi:10.2307/1850219. ISSN 0002-8762. JSTOR 1850219.
- Glenny, Misha (2012). The Balkans, 1804–2012: Nationalism, War and the Great Powers. Toronto: House of Anansi Press. ISBN 978-1-77089-273-6.
- Gverić, Ante; Martinović, Denis (2014). Veliki rat – od atentata u Sarajevu do ulaska talijanske vojske u Zadar [Great War – From the Sarajevo Assassination to Entry of Italian Military in Zadar] (PDF) (in Croatian). Zadar: Croatian State Archives, Zadar Branch. ISBN 978-953-7434-16-8.
- Gverić, Ante (2017). "Hrvatsko-talijanski odnosi u Zadru u vrijeme raspada Austro -Ugarske Monarhije i talijanske okupacije (1918. – 1920.)" [Croatian-Italian Relations in Zadar at the Time of the Collapse of Austro-Hungarian Monarchy and Italian Occupation (1918–1920)]. Radovi Zavoda za povijesne znanosti HAZU u Zadru (in Croatian) (59). Zagreb: Croatian Academy of Sciences and Arts: 437–466. doi:10.21857/y54jofp8gm. ISSN 1330-0474.
- Gverić, Ante (2018). Katalog izložbe "Zadar 1918." ["Zadar 1918" Exhibition Catalogue] (PDF) (in Croatian). Zadar: Croatian State Archives, Zadar Branch. ISBN 978-953-7434-29-8.
- Hill, Chesney (1934). The Doctrine of "rebus sic stantibus" in International Law. Vol. IX. Columbia: University of Missouri. OCLC 1876470.
- Hrvatić, Karmen (2007). "Ratni brodovi u splitskoj luci od 1918. do 1924" [Warships in the Port of Split from 1918 to 1924]. Kulturna baština (in Croatian). 34 (1). Split: Društvo prijatelja kulturne baštine: 157–172. ISSN 0351-0557.
- Ivoš, Erma (1999). "Odnos talijanskih vojno-civilnih vlasti (centralnih i pokrajinskih) u okupiranom dijelu Dalmacije 1919. godine" [The Relationship Between Italian Military and Civil Government (Central and Provincial) in the Occupied Part of Dalmatia in 1919]. Politička misao (in Croatian). 36 (1). Zagreb: University of Zagreb: 183–203. ISSN 0032-3241.
- Knox, MacGregor (2007). To the Threshold of Power, 1922/33: Origins and Dynamics of the Fascist and Nationalist Socialist Dictatorships. Vol. I. Cambridge: Cambridge University Press. ISBN 978-0-521-87860-9.
- Krizman, Bogdan (1970). "Vanjskopolitički položaj Kraljevine Srba, Hrvata i Slovenaca godine 1919" [The Position of the Monarchy of Serbs, Croats and Slovenes in the World in 1919]. Časopis za suvremenu povijest (in Croatian). 2 (1). Zagreb: Croatian Institute of History: 23–59. ISSN 0590-9597.
- Lanchester, George Herbert (1950). "1937–38: Major-General Sydney Capel Peck". Institution of Mechanical Engineers.
- Ledeen, Michael (1977). The First Duce: D'Annunzio at Fiume. Baltimore, London: Johns Hopkins University Press. ISBN 978-0-8018-1860-8.
- MacMillan, Margaret (2002). Paris 1919: Six Months That Changed the World. New York City: Random House Publishing Group. ISBN 9780375760525.
- Matijević, Zlatko (2008). "Narodno vijeće Slovenaca, Hrvata i Srba u Zagrebu: Osnutak, djelovanje i nestanak (1918/1919)" [National Council of Slovenes, Croats and Serbs in Zagreb: Founding, Actions and Disappearance (1918/1919)]. Fontes: Izvori Za Hrvatsku Povijest (in Croatian). 14 (1). Zagreb: Croatian State Archives: 35–66. ISSN 1330-6804.
- Merlicco, Giordano (2021). "Between old Austria and new foes: Italy and the Yugoslav project (1917–1918)" (PDF). Istorijski Zapisi. XCIV (1–2). Podgorica: Istorijski institut Crne Gore: 115–138. ISSN 0021-2652.
- Patafta, Daniel (2004). "Promjene u nacionalnoj strukturi stanovništva grada Rijeke od 1918. do 1924. godine" [Changes in the National Structure of the Population of the City of Rijeka from 1918 to 1924]. Časopis za suvremenu povijest (in Croatian). 36 (2). Zagreb: Croatian Institute of History: 683–700. ISSN 0590-9597.
- Patafta, Daniel (2006). "Privremene vlade u Rijeci (listopad 1918. – siječanj 1924.)" [Temporary Governments in Rijeka, October 1918 – January 1924]. Časopis za suvremenu povijest (in Croatian). 38 (1). Zagreb: Croatian Institute of History: 197–222. ISSN 0590-9597.
- Pavlović, Srdja (2008). Balkan Anschluss: The Annexation of Montenegro and the Creation of the Common South Slavic State. West Lafayette: Purdue University Press. ISBN 978-1-55753-465-1.
- Pavlowitch, Kosta St. (2003). "The First World War and Unification of Yugoslavia". In Djokic, Dejan (ed.). Yugoslavism: Histories of a Failed Idea, 1918–1992. London: C. Hurst & Co. pp. 27–41. ISBN 1-85065-663-0.
- Perica, Vjekoslav (2010). "Međunarodna mirovna misija u Splitu nakon Prvog svjetskog rata (1918.–1921.) prema arhivu Ratne mornarice SAD-a i drugim izvorima" [International Peace Mission on Split After the World War I (1918–1921) from the Perspective of the United States Navy]. Časopis za suvremenu povijest (in Croatian). 42 (1). Zagreb: Croatian Institute of History: 127–156. ISSN 0590-9597.
- Pizzi, Katia (2001). A City in Search of an Author. London: Sheffield Academic Press. ISBN 9780567244970.
- Prister, Boris (2019). "Spomen-medalja ekspedicije u Rijeku (Medaglia commemorativa della spedizione di Fiume)" [Memorial Medal of the Rijeka Expedition (Medaglia commemorativa della spedizione di Fiume)]. Numizmatičke Vijesti (in Croatian). 61 (72). Zagreb: Croatian Numismatical Society: 170–183. ISSN 0546-9422.
- Ramet, Sabrina P. (2006). The Three Yugoslavias: State-building and Legitimation, 1918–2005. Bloomington: Indiana University Press. ISBN 9780253346568.
- Tamaro, Attilio (31 May 1919). "The Question of Fiume". The Spectator. London. pp. 9–10. ISSN 0038-6952.
- Vego, Milan (1982). "The Yugoslav Navy 1918–1941". Warship International. XIX (4): 342–361. ISSN 0043-0374.
- Wilcox, Vanda (2021). The Italian Empire and the Great War. Oxford: Oxford University Press. ISBN 9780198822943.
- Zgrablić, Milan (2005). "Poteškoće oko osnivanja obiju bolnica u Sušaku" [Difficulties in Establishing Hospitals in Sušak]. Acta medico-historica Adriatica (in Croatian). 3 (2). Rijeka: Hrvatsko znanstveno društvo za povijest zdravstvene kulture: 223–242. ISSN 1334-4366.
