= 1918–1920 unrest in Split =

Fights between Croats and Italians

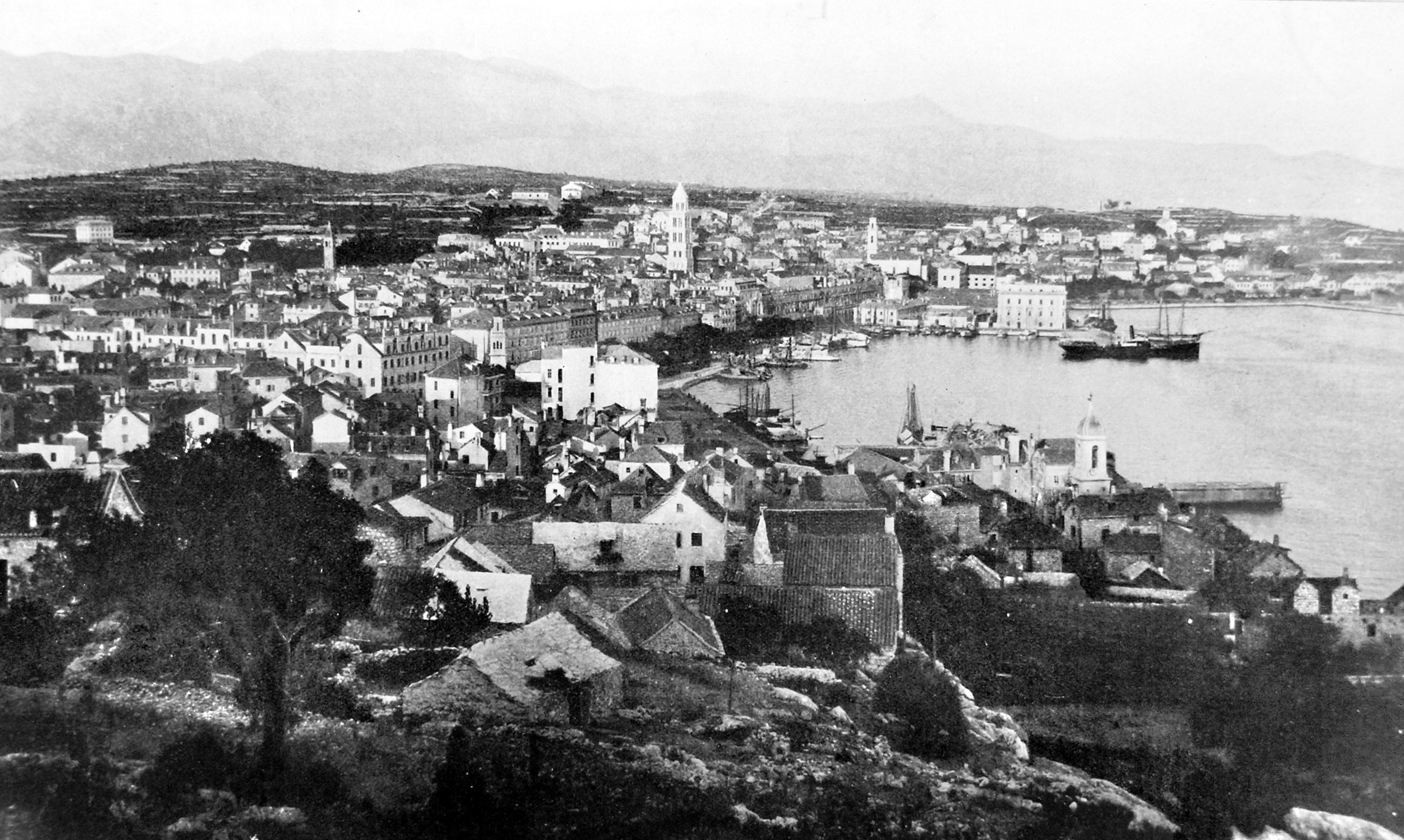
Split in the early 20th century

In 1918–1920, during the occupation of the eastern Adriatic, a series of violent fights took place in the city of Split between Croats and Italians, culminating in a struggle on 11 July 1920 that resulted in the deaths of Captain Tommaso Gulli of the Italian protected cruiser Puglia, Croat civilian Matej Miš, and Italian sailor Aldo Rossi. The incidents were the cause of the destruction in Trieste of the Slovenian Cultural Centre by Italian Fascists.

== Background ==
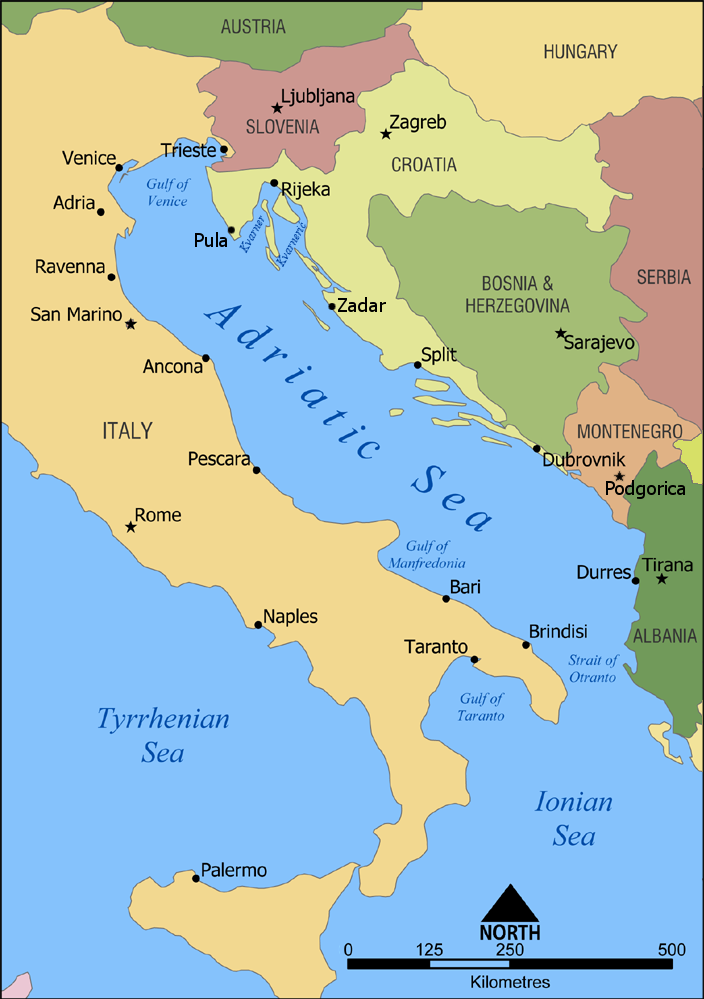
Location of the Adriatic Sea.

The confrontations were the product of a centuries-long struggle for the control of the eastern coast of the Adriatic Sea between South Slavs and Italians. During the second half of the 19th century Split saw antagonism between the pro-Italian Autonomist Party and the pro-Yugoslav People's Party.

Hostilities between the two ethnicities increased after the fall of the Austro-Hungarian Empire, when Italian irredentists called for the annexation of several formerly Austro-Hungarian cities on the eastern coast of the Adriatic Sea, which were home to both South Slavs and Italians, into Italy, and occupied several of them by force.

== Population ==
According to the 1910 census the population of Split numbered 20,275, of which 18,176 (85.18%) were Croats or Serbs (Croats were the majority, but the census made no distinction between the two), while 2,082 (9.73%) were Italians.

In the city of Split there was an autochthonous Italian community, which was reorganized in November 1918 through the foundation of the "National Fasces" (not related to fascism) led by Leonardo Pezzoli, Antonio Tacconi, Edoardo Pervan and Stefano Selem, former members of the Autonomist Party, which had been dissolved by the Austrian authorities in 1915.

Following the Treaty of Rapallo, the Italians of Dalmatia could opt for the acquisition of Italian citizenship instead of the Yugoslavian one, while maintaining residence: despite a violent campaign of intimidation on the part of Yugoslavia, over 900 families of Italian speaking "Spalatini" had exercised the option to be Italians. Furthermore, a Census of Italians living outside Italy was carried out in 1927: in Spalato and surrounding area 3,337 Italian citizens were counted.

== History ==
Facts of Trogir (fatti di Traù)
- Part of the Aftermath of World War I
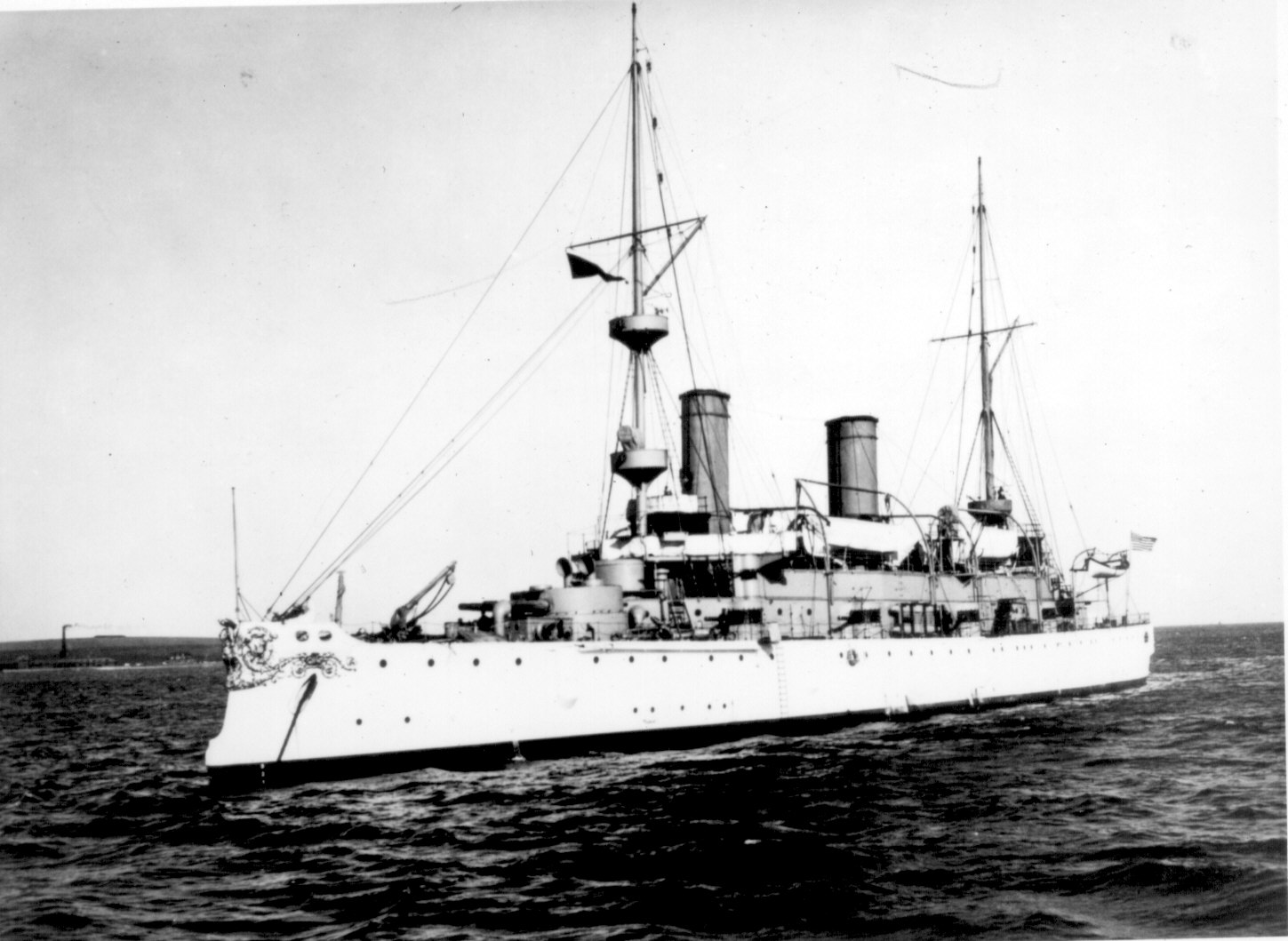
- The USS Olympia, used to land sailors and marines during the incident.
Date	September 23, 1919
Location	Trogir, Dalmatia, Kingdom of Yugoslavia (present day Croatia)
Result	United States-Yugoslavian-Italian victory: Coup attempt thwarted; Serbian garrison released; Renegades arrested

Belligerents
United States; Italy; Yugoslavia; Citizens of Trogir	(Kingdom of Italy) Renegade Italian Army troops

Commanders and leaders
(United States) Captain David F. Boyd Jr. (United States) Rear Admiral Philip Andrews (United States) Lieutenant Commander R. S. Fields (Kingdom of Italy) Commander Paolo Maroni	Count Nino De Fanfogna; Lieutenant Emanuele Torri-Mariani

Strength
(Kingdom of Yugoslavia) 1 garrison (United States) 1 destroyer 1 protected cruiser 101 sailors and marines (Kingdom of Italy) 1 protected cruiser	3-4 trucks ~100 soldiers

Casualties and losses
(Kingdom of Yugoslavia) 1 garrison captured, subsequently released	10+ arrested

After the Austrian defeat, in the first half of November 1918 Italian troops unilaterally occupied territories of Austria-Hungary promised to Italy by the secret 1915 Pact of London. Split was not one of those areas and was placed under Allied military occupation; the Italians sent two warships - the scout cruiser Augusto Riboty and the protected cruiser Puglia - while the Italian minority publicly demanded the annexation of the city into Italy, supported by some Italian political circles. At the same time, Croats formed the National Guard, a local militia to guarantee public order.

On 9 November 1918, two French destroyers entered the port of Split. The Italians displayed the flag of Italy in the windows of their homes to give the impression citizens supported Italy's bid for annexation. This however incited a riot and the flags were torn down. The commander of a former Austrian ship already docked at the port ordered the removal of the flags. Other incidents and demonstrations against Italy happened in other cities, like Trogir and the Kaštela. Italian Admiral Enrico Millo, appointed temporary military commander for the parts of Dalmatia occupied by Italy, unilaterally dispatched Italian naval vessels to the city. On 12 January, Puglia arrived among large protests.

On 12 September 1919, Gabriele D'Annunzio led around 2,600 rebel troops from the Italian Army - some units of the Sardinia Grenadiers - Italian nationalists and irredentists to seize the Adriatic port city of Fiume, forcing the withdrawal of the inter-Allied (American, British, Italian and French) occupying forces, and later proceeding south to occupy the Dalmatian city of Zara. As a consequence armed nationalist irregulars commanded by Dalmatian Italian Count Fanfogna proceeded further south to Split's neighbouring city of Trogir and organized a similar occupation, quickly nipped by the Allies. In Split, located just south across the Kaštela Bay from Trogir, the citizens feared their (significantly larger) city would be next in line, and that the joint Allied military administration would once again stand aside while another Dalmatian city came under the control of armed Italian nationalist irregulars.

=== Incident of 9 November 1918 ===
On 9 November, the first French vessels arrived to Split. Destroyers Touareg and Sakalave sailed into the Port of Split for a day, soon followed by Foudre. The French ships were welcomed by the population. At the same time, proponents of Italian annexation of Dalmatia took the opportunity to hoist Italian flags in the port. This led to civil unrest and conflict between the city's pro-Italian minority and anti-Italian majority, as well as forceful removal of the flags by a gathered crowd. An Italian torpedo boat sailed to the city, but it had to be anchored in the port since nobody would receive its mooring lines.

=== Admirals' conference ===
The civil unrest persisted during the allied occupation of Split. Friction arose in the course of distribution of food and travel documents from Italian cruiser Puglia as only the non-Italian population encountered (real or perceived) difficulties. News of the Italian blocking distribution of food in Dalmatia to those who would not sign a declaration of loyalty to Italy, along with arbitrary arrests and deportations, reached US President Woodrow Wilson. In response, he decided to withhold aid intended for Italy. There were occasional conflicts between Italian sailors, specifically crew of Puglia and non-Italian population of the city. Typical provocations involved hoisting of the flag of the Kingdom of Serbs, Croats and Slovenes in the port with assembled citizens taking the opportunity to salute the flag while shouting insults to Italy. In response, Italian sailors and officers would come in verbal conflict with the citizens. This prompted US Rear Admiral Albert Parker Niblack to declare a ban on public gatherings, singing of patriotic songs and flag waving.

On 24 February 1919, a conference was convened in Split to examine allegations of persecution of Italian minority in Split presented by Italian press. The conference was attended by Rear Admirals William H. G. Bullard and Niblack on behalf of the United States, Admiral Umberto Cagni and Rear Admiral Ugo Rombo on behalf of Italy, Rear Admiral Jean Ratyé on behalf of France, and Admiral Edward Buxton Kiddle representing the British, as well as representatives of the city government. During the conference, another incident took place, when windows of the Gabinetto di lettura Italian society were smashed. City authorities reported to the conference on 39 arrested and damage compensation. Rombo proposed landing a large Italian force to quell the civil unrest, but the idea was opposed by Niblack who held Italian navy and propaganda responsible. The conference agreed on interallied patrols to ensure order in Split. They were initially 12-strong, with three sailors drawn from each allied navy taking part. Later, the patrols were reduced in strength by two-thirds as the situation gradually calmed down. Another incident took place on 9 March, just as the admirals' conference ended. Italian sailors clashed with civilians ashore, injuring and arresting a number of them. The incident was investigated by an interallied commission which concluded that the Italians were responsible for the conflict and that the arrests were illegal on 18 March.

=== 27 January 1920 incident ===
The fear of an annexation by Italy led to a violent attitude by some members of the Croat majority towards the Italian minority; both in Split and Trogir, Italians were assaulted in several instances and their property damaged, especially after Fanfogna's attempt to seize Trogir. The most serious incident happened on 27 January 1920, after the Allies had sent to Belgrade an unwelcome note about the settlement of the new Italian-Yugoslav border. A public rally against Italian imperialism was organized, but it ended in an assault on the offices of some Italian associations and about twenty Italian shops, whose signs, shutters and windows were shattered.

=== 11 July 1920 incident ===
On 11 July 1920, street conflict erupted between Italians and Croats. Accounts diverge about the cause of these clashes: according to Croat sources, they were triggered by the removal of a Yugoslav flag by two officers from Puglia. The incident occurred in Ivanko Shipyard where a crowd had gathered to celebrate the birthday of Peter I, the king of the Kingdom of Serbs, Croats and Slovenes. According to Italian sources, they were started by people who had just attended to a conference held by a Croat nationalist.

The clash was stopped by the city police and pushed the Italian sailors to the port. A group of officers of Puglia found refuge in a place near the docks: captain Gulli ordered a boat under the command of lieutenant Gallo to rescue them, but it was blocked by the crowd. According to Italian sources, Gallo then fired "warning shots" into the air. Soon Gulli went ashore himself on a motorboat, but on approaching the docks found a large crowd and shots were exchanged. A hand grenade thrown at the vessel fatally wounded sailor Aldo Rossi and hurt several others. According to Croatian sources, gunfire was exchanged between the police on the shore and sailors aboard Puglia and the motorboat, and two bombs were thrown from the motorboat to the shore. Three were killed (Gulli, the motorboat's helmsman, and a civilian Mate Miš) and several wounded. The incident was investigated by Split city authorities and the US Navy. The investigation found that the Italian fire was opened from togh Puglia and a submarine chaser towards the shore. In response US commanding officer in Split, Rear Admiral Philip Andrews briefly prohibited public events.

In Italy the reaction to what happened in Split was indignation, while in the city of Trieste (another former Austro-Hungarian annexed by Italy) Italian proto-fascists and nationalists destroyed the Trieste National Hall (Narodni dom), the center of the Slovene theatre in Trieste and other activities.

== See also ==
- History of Dalmatia

== Bibliography ==
- Dalbello M.C.; Razza antonello. Per una storia delle comunità italiane della Dalmazia. Fondazione Culturale Maria ed Eugenio Dario Rustia Traine. Trieste, 2004.
- Lederer, Ivo. La Jugoslavia dalla conferenza di pace al trattato di Rapallo 1919–1920. Il Saggiatore. Milano, 1964.
- Menini, Giulio. Passione adriatica. Ricordi di Dalmazia 1918–1920. Zanichelli. Bologna, 1925.
- Monzali, Luciano. Antonio Tacconi e la comunità italiana di Spalato. Editore Scuola Dalmata dei SS. Giorgio e Trifone. Venezia, 2007.
- Monzali, Luciano. Italiani di Dalmazia. 1914–1924 Le Lettere Firenze, 2007.
- Salza, Silvio. La marina italiana nella grande guerra (Vol. VIII). Vallecchi. Firenze, 1942.
- Tacconi, Ildebrando. La grande esclusa: Spalato cinquanta anni fa (in "Per la Dalmazia con amore e con angoscia"). Editore Del Bianco, Udine, 1994
