= Edward Hazlett =

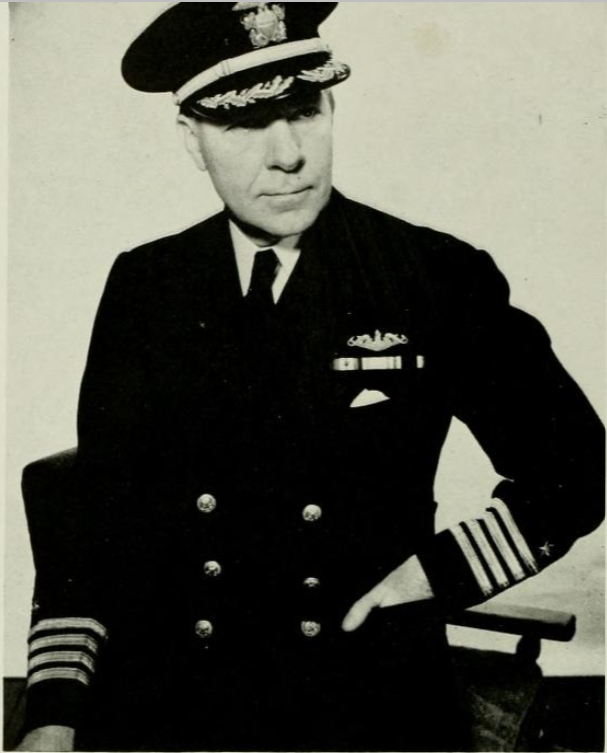
Edward E. Hazlett, Jr., 1945

Edward E. "Swede" Hazlett (February 22, 1892 – November 2, 1958) and Dwight D. Eisenhower were natives of Abilene, Kansas who sparked a friendship that would last from their meeting in high school until Hazlett’s death from cancer in 1958.

From the beginning of their freshman year in Abilene High School, Eisenhower felt protective of Hazlett and quickly bestowed the nickname "Swede" on him. According to Eisenhower, "He [Hazlett] was a big fellow...but he was raised in a quiet atmosphere and occasionally a few people smaller than he would try to bulldoze him...I felt protective, a sort of obligation to him, and I took it upon myself to tell a few of the so-and-so's to lay off."

In his book At Ease: Stories I Tell to Friends, Eisenhower writes that Hazlett persuaded him to apply for an appointment to the United States Naval Academy. According to Eisenhower, "It was not difficult to persuade me that this was a good move...I realized that my own college education would not be achieved without considerable delay while I tried to accumulate money. With Ed [ Edgar N. Eisenhower ] already in college and receiving some help from Father and with Earl [ Earl D. Eisenhower ] and Milton [ Milton Stover Eisenhower ] coming on in the future, I could see that if I could made it [sic], I would take a burden off my family." Both Hazlett and Eisenhower passed the entrance examination but Eisenhower was barred from entrance because he exceeded the maximum allowable entrance age. With that, Hazlett attended the Naval Academy and Eisenhower accepted an appointment to the United States Military Academy at West Point, New York.

While Eisenhower's career blossomed with preparations to enter the Second World War, ill health (which would plague him the rest of his life) brought on by a heart attack ended Hazlett’s active military career in 1939. He would later return to duty during the Second World War first as an instructor at the Naval Academy and then as the commander of the naval training program at the University of North Carolina before finally retiring in 1946.

During his presidency, Eisenhower would frequently write personal and revealing letters to Hazlett even during his most busy periods. Usually never one to openly share his feelings, Eisenhower would pour his thoughts and concerns into these letters. The letters addressed his thoughts on topics as diverse as, "Vietnam, the Middle East, civil rights, defense spending, [and] the problem of who would succeed him as president." Thus, Eisenhower's letters to Hazlett serve as a window into his thoughts on his own presidency.
