= Philip Andrews (admiral) =

US Navy officer (1866–1935)

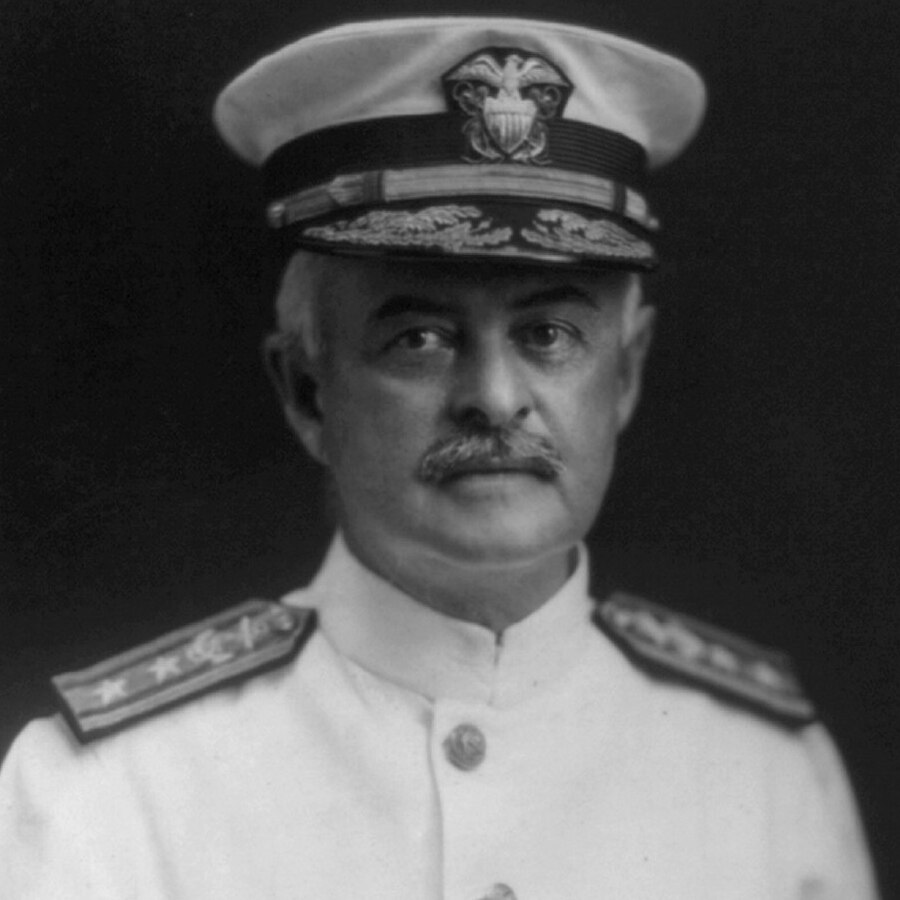
- Andrews in 1921
- Born: March 30, 1866; New York City, U.S.
- Died: December 18, 1935 (aged 69); San Diego, U.S.
- Burial place: Arlington National Cemetery
- Military career
- Allegiance: United States
- Branch: United States Navy
- Service years: 1886–1930
- Rank: Rear Admiral; Vice Admiral (Temporary)
- Commands: Wompatuck; Bureau of Navigation; Montana; Maryland; Mississippi; US Naval Detachment in Adriatic; US Naval Base, Cardiff, Wales; US Naval Forces, Europe; Navy Yard, Boston, Massachusetts
- Conflicts: Philippine–American War; World War I
- Awards: Navy Distinguished Service Medal

Philip Andrews (30 March 1866 – 18 December 1935) was a United States Navy officer during World War I who later became admiral.

== Early life and career ==
Andrews was born in New York City, and was appointed to the United States Naval Academy from New Jersey in 1882. He graduated on 1886 and, after the required two years of sea duty on board USS Brooklyn and USS Pensacola, was commissioned ensign in 1888. He was transferred to the USS Chicago in 1891. He also served on USS Raleigh, USS Newark, USS Columbia and other ships, before being transferred to South Bethlehem where he was Inspector of Ordnance from 1898 to 1899.

After more sea duty, he assumed his first command, the armed tug USS Wompatuck in 1901. The tug was transferred to the Philippines via the Mediterranean Sea and the Suez Canal under his command and provided support for US troops in the Philippine–American War. Andrews became the navigator on USS New Orleans in late 1902. He was promoted to the rank of Commander in 1909. In 1912, he was appointed Chief of the Bureau of Navigation with the temporary rank of Rear Admiral. With his transfer a year later, he got his old rank of commander back and was promoted to Captain in 1913 and commanded USS Montana. In 1914, he took command on USS Maryland. In 1916, Andrews attended the Naval War College. From 1917 to 1918, he was a staff member of the Fifth Naval District in Norfolk, Virginia. In January 1918 he became captain of the battleship USS Mississippi. In 1919–1921, Andrews was the commanding officer of the US forces deployed to occupation of the eastern Adriatic.

He was promoted to full rear admiral in 1919 and became commander of the US Naval Base in Cardiff. After the war he was transferred back to the US, but in June 1923 was appointed Commander of the US Naval Forces in Europe and was temporarily promoted to vice admiral.

In 1925, he reverted to his permanent rank of rear admiral and became commandant of the First Naval District, holding that position until his retirement in June 1930.

Philip Andrews died on 18 December 1935 in San Diego. He was interred at Arlington National Cemetery on 26 March 1936.
