= H. James Burgwyn =

American historian

- Born: 1936 (age 89–90)
- Occupations: Historian, emeritus university professor
- Writing career
- Period: 1915–1943
- Subject: Italian History

H. James Burgwyn (born 1936) is an American historian. He is a West Chester University professor emeritus of history, and an authority on the foreign policy and military strategy of Italy in the period from World War I to World War II.

Bergwyn lives in Philadelphia, Pennsylvania.

== Published works ==
- The Legend of the Mutilated Victory: Italy, the Great War, and the Paris Peace Conference, 1915–1919, Greenwood Press (1993) ISBN 0-313-28885-2
- Italian Foreign Policy in the Interwar Period: 1918-1940, Praeger Publishers (1997) ISBN 0-275-94877-3
- Empire on the Adriatic: Mussolini's Conquest of Yugoslavia 1941–1943, Enigma Books (2005) ISBN 1-929631-35-9
- Mussolini Warlord: Failed Dreams of Empire, 1940-1943, Enigma Books (2013), ISBN 1-936274-29-9
- Mussolini and the Salò Republic, 1943 - 1945: The Failure of a Puppet Regime, Palgrave MacMillan (2018), ISBN 3319761889
