= Rikard Lenac =

Croatian lawyer and politician

Rikard Lenac (March 16, 1868 – 1949) was a lawyer and a one-time governor of the city of Rijeka.

Lenac was born in Rijeka, a son of the navy captain Mate Lenac from Martinšćica, and Antonija, née. Lučić, from Volosko. The father, commander of the Austrian brigantine Pietro, died in Brazil, when he was five years old. After his father's death the mother remarried with captain Vjenceslav Harasim from Lovran. From that marriage the famous writer and pedagogic Gemma Harasim was born, who maintained an epistolary relationship with her half-brother throughout her life.

Rikard Lenac was a known lawyer, who after the collapse of Austro-Hungarian monarchy was nominated by the National Council of the State of Slovenes, Croats and Serbs as administrator of Fiume, taking the office from the deposed Hungarian governor, until November 17, 1918, when Italian army general Enrico Asinari di San Marzo relieved Dr. Rikard Lenac of his post and took power.

Afterward he retired to private life, writing several literary and historical works. He died in 1949.
