= Edward Buxton Kiddle =

Admiral Sir Edward Buxton Kiddle, KBE, CB (2 November 1866 – 29 April 1933) was a Royal Navy officer.
