= Attilio Tamaro =

Italian diplomat, historian, and journalist (1884–1956)

Attilio Tamaro (13 July 1884 – 20 February 1956) was an Italian diplomat, historian, and journalist. He represented fascist Italy as consul-general in Hamburg (1927–1929), and as ambassador to Finland (1930–1935) and Switzerland (1935–1943).

== Early life ==
Born in Trieste, then part of Austria-Hungary, Tamaro graduated with a dissertation on the history of art in Graz. A fiery Italian nationalist, he espoused the cause of Italian irredentism, or the annexation of Italian-speaking areas by Italy.

In World War I, Tamaro served as a volunteer in the Italian army. After Trieste joined Italy in 1919, he wrote for nationalist papers and joined the fascist party in 1922.

== Diplomatic service ==
In 1927, the fascist regime began to staff its diplomatic service with long-serving party members. Benefiting from this policy, Tamaro, who had no diplomatic training, was appointed as consul-general in Hamburg (1927–1929), then as ambassador to Finland (1930–1935). After rejecting an appointment in China, he was appointed ambassador to Switzerland in October 1935.

Posted to Bern, Tamaro conveyed a thoroughly negative image of the country in his reports and in his diary. He expressed disdain for Swiss democracy, which he considered decadent, and Swiss political and military leaders, which he considered mediocre or feeble. Still, he opposed an Axis attack on Switzerland for strategic reasons: he feared that Germany would annex most of the country, leaving the Germans at the gates of Milan. His view was shared in the Italian foreign ministry, although Tamaro privately assumed that was mainly because many fascist leaders stored their benefits of corruption in Swiss bank accounts.

Tamaro's diplomatic service came to an end after a friend of his, the financier Camillo Castiglioni, who was both a Jew and a supporter of the fascist regime, was involved in a financial scandal concerning a fuel refinery in Switzerland. Tamaro's attempts to aid Castiglioni (as well as his superiors' dissatisfaction with his work) led to his recall and forced retirement in May 1943, as well as his expulsion from the Party as a "friend of the Jews".

== Post-war life ==
In the early 1950s, Tamaro resumed his work as a historian, writing works on the history of the fascist regime and the 1943–45 civil war. He died embittered in 1956 in Rome, having described his life as "pointless and worthless".

== Literature ==
Tamaro's diplomatic service in Finland is covered by a 2016 doctoral thesis by Andrea Rizzi. His service in Switzerland is the subject of a chapter in Tindaro Gatani's book on Italian diplomats in Switzerland and by a 2023 article by Marco Jorio in the Neue Zürcher Zeitung. His 800-page diary was edited and published by Gianni Scipione Rossi in 2021.
