= Liburnian Autonomist Movement =

The Liburnian Autonomous Movement or the Liburnian Federalist Movement was a political group founded in Rijeka in the summer of 1943, disbanded in the last months of the Second World War. Its most prominent members were killed during the Fiume Autonomists purge.

== Historical overview ==
For centuries the city of Rijeka was a corpus separatum within the Austrian Empire and later the Austro-Hungarian. This is linked to a long political autonomy, which led to the foundation in 1896 of the local namesake party.

Headed by Riccardo Zanella, on 24 April 1921 the autonomists won the parliamentary elections of the newborn Free State of Fiume, but their government was overthrown in March of the following year by the nationalist and pro-fascist group, reunited in the National Block. Zanella was forced into exile together with all his cabinet, later the city was annexed to the Kingdom of Italy following the Treaty of Rome (1924).

== The contention for Fiume at the end of the Second World War ==
The city of Rijeka, one of the focal points of the Adriatic dispute between Italians and Slavs (Slovenians and Croats), was declared annexed to Yugoslavia by a group of Slovenian and Croat Partisans in the Declarations of Pazin of September 13, 1943.

This event, connected to the fall of fascism, gave rise to the resurgence of the autonomist feelings of the Fiuman population. The political heirs of Zanella - at the time exiled in France - regrouped in the Autonomous Movement under the guidance of some of the oldest Autonomist Party members, among whom Mario Blasich had the most authority. Referring to the Treaty of Rapallo (1920) and describing the Free State of Fiume as the first victim of fascist annexation, they again requested the implementation of an autonomous statute for the post-war Fiume. Despite cooperating with the communists during the war in anti-fascist actions, the autonomists considered it impossible to form a political alliance with them.

At the beginning of 1944 a part of the zanelliani faction, mostly made up of younger members, merged into the Italian Autonomous Fiume Movement (FAI), founded by Luigi Polano. Their goal for the city was the restoration of autonomy, similar to that enjoyed at the time of the Austro-Hungarian Empire, and they advocated armed resistance against the Axis forces (albeit without creating partisan formations), accepting collaboration with the Partisans in order to defend the industrial heritage of the city. This autonomist component was viewed with suspicion by the Partisans, appearing as a possible alternative to annexation of the city to Yugoslavia that the Partisans had in mind, albeit while publicly declaring and promising full autonomy to the local population.

== The creation of the Liburnian Autonomist Movement ==
After the fall of fascism (25 July 1943) other autonomists, mainly former fascist militants, joined the Liburnian Autonomist Movement (Movimento Autonomista Liburnico), led by the engineer Giovanni Rubini. Also believing a formal agreement with the Partisans to be impossible, they planned the transformation of the Fiume region into a federated state.

The autonomists established their own program, which they sent to London, Berlin, Washington, and Rome. The program centered around making Fiume the capital of a state called the "Free Territory of Quarnero", which would include the former Hungarian Littoral, the western part of the Gorski Kotar, a few nearby Slovenian municipalities, the islands of Krk, Rab and Lošinj, and the easternmost part of Istria. All this territory would have been divided into cantons, on the Swiss model. Each canton would have had the right to use the local mother tongue in its area, while the official language of state institutions would have been Italian.

Among the most important exponents of the Movement were Ramiro Antonini, Icilio Bacci, Salvatore Belasic (or Bellasich), Carlo Colussi, Riccardo Gigante, Ruggero Gotthardi, Arturo Maineri, Ettore Rippa, Gino Sirola, Antonio Vio, and Arnaldo Viola. Of these, the Yugoslavs later killed Bacci, Colussi, Gigante, and Sirola.

== The Rubini Memorandum ==
The discovery of the autonomous project of Rubini during a search, inside a file entitled "Memorandum Rubini", was the formal cause chosen by the Germans to justify the arrest of the Fiume police chief Giovanni Palatucci on September 13, 1944.

== The Yugoslav military occupation and the purge of all Autonomists ==
Tito's troops entered Fiume on May 3, 1945, without any major insurrectionary movement developing in the city, not last thanks to the promises of cultural and political respect the Titoists made to the local population.

Upon entering the city and in the first month, the communist authorities got rid of more than 600 civilians only in the first month of occupation. Soon the Yugoslav propaganda machine was put on work and it started treating the autonomists harshly, accusing them of betrayal, opportunism and even fascism, in order to weaken their position in the city. From the first hours of the occupation, the Yugoslav secret police organized punitive teams to search for the autonomous leaders and get rid of them: between May the 2nd and May the 4th lost Mario Blasich, Nevio Skull, Mario De Hajnal, Giuseppe Sincich, Radoslav Baucer and other autonomist leaders were victims of summary killings. They all were collaborating with the partisans for years.

Their fate had been anticipated by that of Giovanni Rubini, who was considered the most prominent leader of these political faction and therefore killed by a Yugoslav commando at the entrance of his house on the 21st of April 1945.

Nonetheless the movement was able to hold a significant influence and great following in Fiume well into the 2 years of Jugoslav occupation, and despite many of its leaders being killed by the Jugoslav secret police, it was able to dominate the union elections organized in Fiume's factories in early 1946 by the occupational authorities. These elections were therefore not recognised by the communist leadership and as a consequence between 1500 and 2000 sympathisers of the Autonomist cause were arrested by the occupational authorities. New elections were held in mid 1946, under supervision and rigged to have plebiscitary victory of the communist candidates.

During the peace talks in Paris the ousted president of the Free State of Fiume Riccardo Zanella tried to spearhead the cause of the tiny state, this time supported also by the previous political rival Andrea Ossoinack. The new Italian minister of foreign affairs Carlo Sforza, an early anti-fascist dissident, supported this idea and lobbied with the Allies to have Fiume reinstated as a free state and for it to become a head-quarter of the newly formed United Nations (this idea was following on the footsteps of the previous Wilsonian proposal of having Fiume as a head-quarter of the League of Nations). The idea found also the official support of the Italian president Alcide de Gasperi, after the Allies displayed little interest in the option of keeping Italian sovereignty over Fiume's territory.

Tito in official correspondence with the other leaders and Zanella himself showed clear openings towards the idea, but in fact the Yugoslavs acted quickly, probably pushed above all by Kardelj, incorporating Fiume in Croatia itself and de facto separating it on the ground from the Istrian territories which kept being treated as disputed territories for a longer period. This ushered in a heavy attack on all civic rights initially granted to the local Fiuman population, and the city's remarkable bilingualism was de facto (but not de jure) abolished 9 years later, in 1954, riding heavily the nationalists sentiments during the Triest Crisis, an operation largely fabricated by the Yugoslav authorities to gather popular support internally.

The exodus of Fiuman people in this 9 year period brought 58,000 of the 66,000 inhabitants to leave the city as a consequence of the growing discrimination, targeted violence and terrorist acts by local authorities. These crimes, although extensively documented and widely confirmed by historians both in Croatia and Italy, still fail to be officially recognised by Rijeka's authorities nowadays and are a source of continuous internal tensions between the population and the city's political elite.
