= List of governors and heads of state of Fiume =

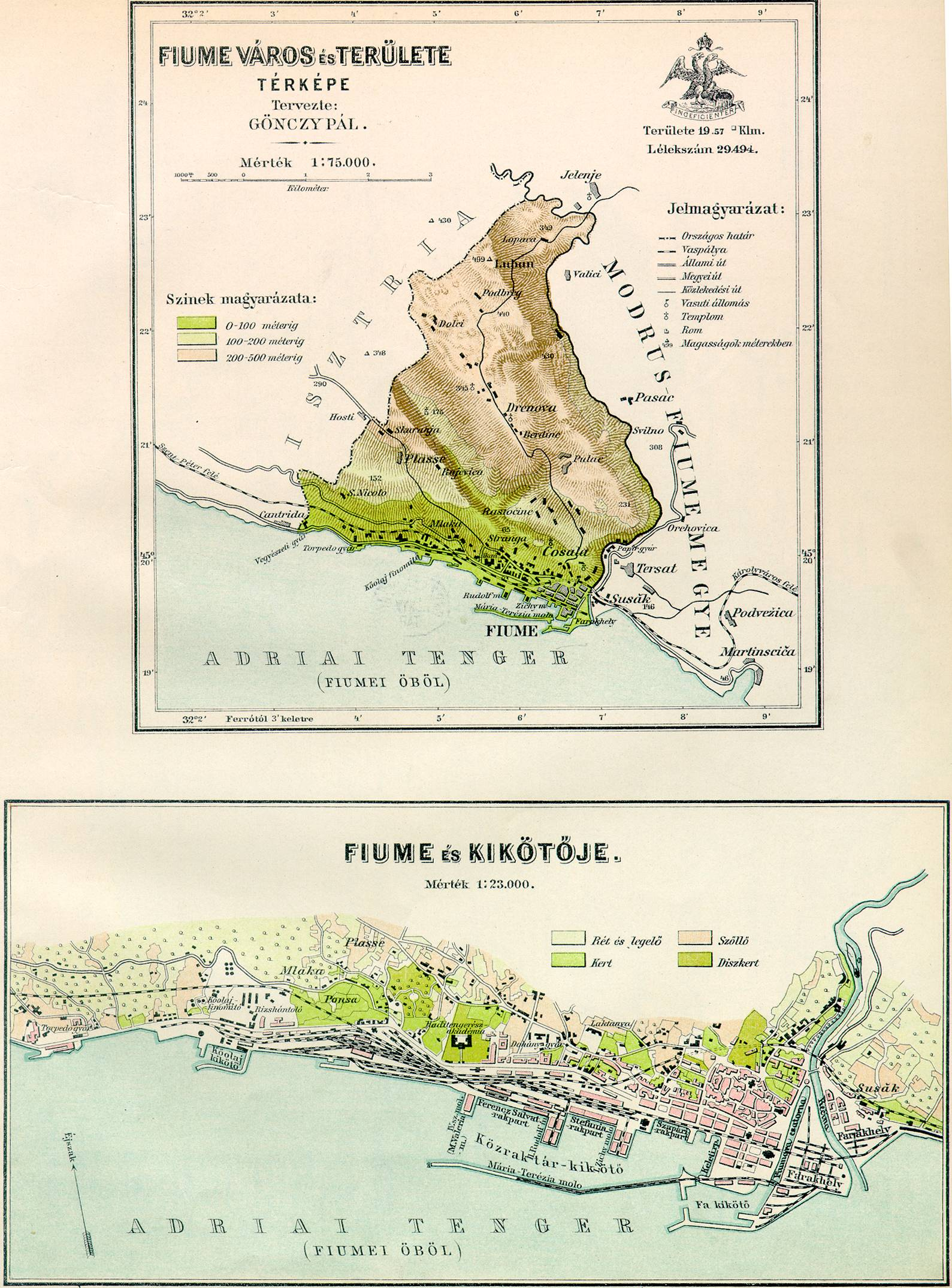
Territory of the corpus separatum before 1918.

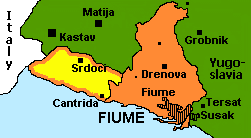
Territory of the Free State from 1920 to 1924.

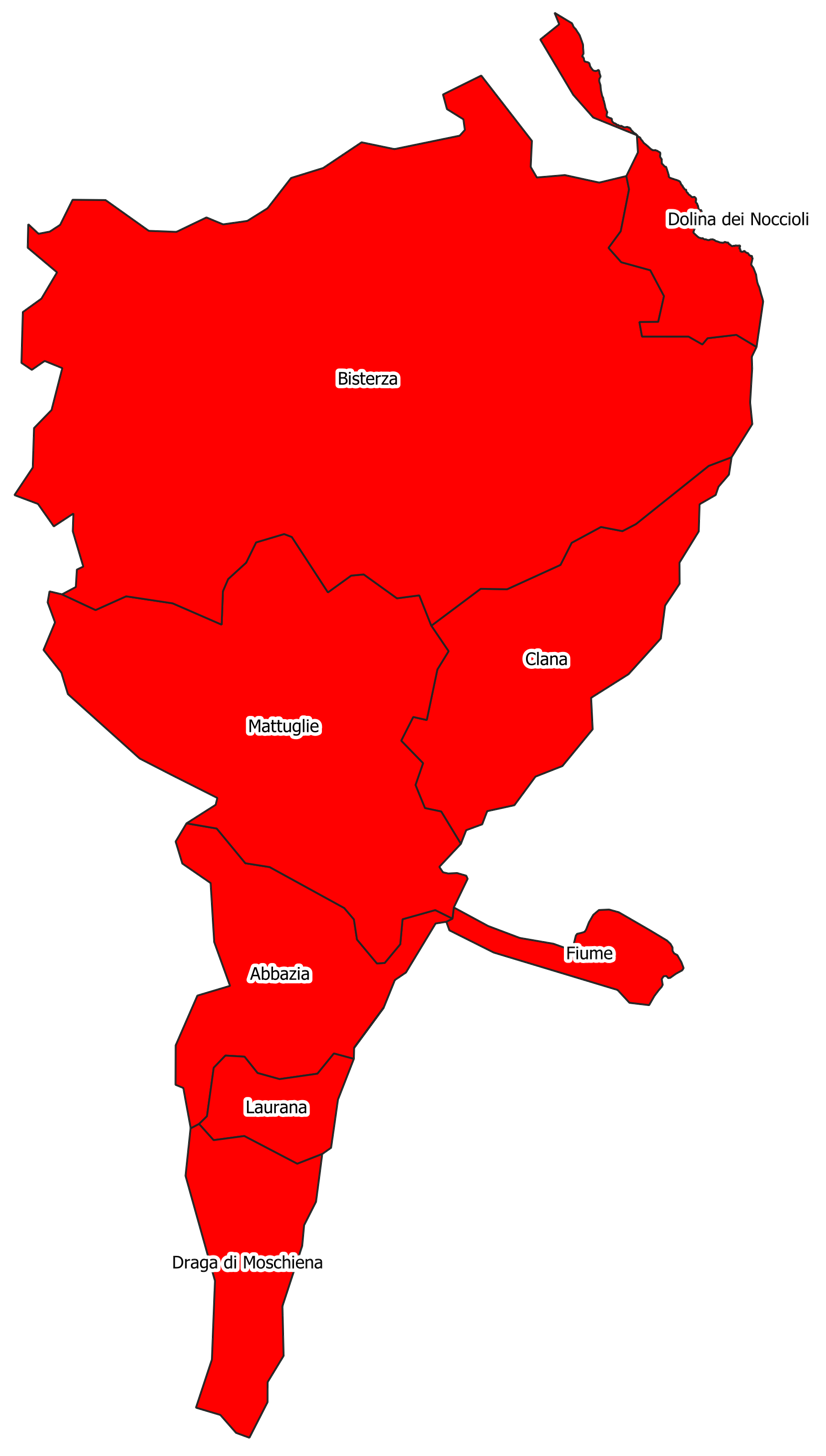
Territory of the Province of Fiume, 1924.

This is a list of governors of the Corpus separatum of Fiume (formally known as City of Fiume and its district), heads of state of the Free State of Fiume and prefects of the Province of Fiume (now modern Rijeka and its surrounding area, in Croatia).

== List ==
(Dates in italics indicate de facto continuation of office)

Tenure	Portrait	Incumbent	Notes
Hungarian suzerainty
20 October 1776 to 1783		József gróf Majláth Székhelyi, Governor	
1783 to 1788		Pál gróf Almásy Zsadányi, Governor	
1788 to 1791		János Pétar gróf Szápáry, Governor	
1791 to 1801		Sándor Pászthory, Governor	
1801 to 1809		József Klobusiczky, Governor	
Illyrian Provinces (French suzerainty)
July 1809 to November 1809		Marc Bryd (Marco de Bryde), Intendant	Did not take office
November 1809 to 1810		François Boleslas Casimir Duval de Chassenon de Curzay, Intendant	
1810 to June 1811		Marie Méry, comte de Contades, Intendant	
1811 to 1813	Part of Civil Croatia		
French Intendants of Civil Croatia in Karlovac
July 1809 to November 1809		Lettardi, Intendant	
November 1809 to November 1810		Louis-Philippe-Joseph Girod de Vienney, baron de Trémont, Intendant	
November 1810 to June 1811		Savinio conte Giorgi, Intendant	
27 June 1811 to 1811		Marie Méry, comte de Contades, Intendant	
1811 to 1813		François-Joseph-Ferdinand Marchal, Intendant	
British suzerainty
3 July 1813 to 26 August 1813		William Hoste, Commander	
Austrian suzerainty
26 August 1813 to September 1813		Laval Graf Nugent von Westmeath, Commander	
2 September 1813 to 1813		Josip Lazarić, Commander	
23 November 1813 to 1814		Giuseppe barone dell' Argento, Provisional Intendant	
7 August 1814 to 1 October 1814		Franz Joseph Graf von Saurau, Commissioner	
1 October 1814 to 1815		Franz Joseph Graf von Saurau, Kreishauptmann	District Captain
1815 to 1816		Johann Nepomuk Freiherr von Grimschitz, Kreishauptmann	District Captain
Kingdom of Illyria (Austrian suzerainty)
April 1816 to 1819		Joseph Freiherr von Weingarten, Kreishauptmann	District Captain
8 August 1819 to 1822		Ludwig Freiherr von Humbracht, Kreishauptmann	District Captain
Hungarian suzerainty
15 October 1822 to 1823		György Majláth, Royal Commissioner	
1823 to 1837		Ferenc Ürményi, Governor	
5 July 1837 to 22 April 1848		Pál Kiss de Nemeskér, Governor	
23 April 1848 to 31 August 1848		János Nepomuk gróf Erdödy, Governor	
Croatian suzerainty
31 August 1848 to 19 May 1859		Josip Jelačić, Governor	Ban of Croatia, Slavonia and Dalmatia
5 September 1848 to 6 August 1850		Josip Bunjevac, Royal Commissioner	
July 1851 to 1852		Antun Rušnov, Civil Captain	
1852 to 1856		Ernst Freiherr von Kellersperg, Civil Captain	
1856 to 1860		Karl Sigmund Graf Hohenwarth, Civil Captain	
1860 to 1861		Hermann Freiherr von Sterneck, Royal Commissioner	
1861 to 1867		Bartol Benedikt Zmajić, Civil Captain	
Hungarian suzerainty
6 April 1867 to 29 July 1870		Ede Cseh de Szentkatolna, Royal commissioner	
29 July 1870 to 5 December 1872		József gróf Zichy de Zich et Vásonkeö, Governor	
26 February 1873 to 1 November 1883		Géza gróf Szapáry de Szapár, Governor	
1 November 1883 to 6 March 1892		Ágost gróf Zichy, Governor	
6 March 1892 to 2 October 1896		Lajos gróf Batthyány de Nemetujvár, Governor	
2 October 1896 to 14 July 1897		Rezsö báró Abele de Lilienberg, Governor	
14 July 1897 to 23 November 1897		Tibor Gaal de Hatvan, acting Governor	1st term
23 November 1897 to 2 August 1903		László gróf Szapáry de Szapár, Governor	
2 August 1903 to 10 December 1903		Tibor Gaal de Hatvan, acting Governor	2nd term
10 December 1903 to 17 February 1905		Ervin báró Roszner, Governor	
17 February 1905 to 17 October 1905		Tibor Gaal de Hatvan, acting Governor	3rd term
17 October 1905 to 26 December 1905		Pál gróf Szapáry de Szapár, Governor	
26 December 1905 to 24 May 1906		Tibor Gaal de Hatvan, acting Governor	4th term
4 April 1906 to 29 April 1906		György gróf Károlyi de Nagykároly, Governor	
24 May 1906 to 7 December 1909		Sándor gróf Nákó de Nagyszentmiklós, Governor	
7 December 1909 to 13 November 1910		István gróf Wickenburg de Capelló, acting Governor	
13 November 1910 to 31 July 1917		István gróf Wickenburg de Capelló, Governor	
31 July 1917 to 29 October 1918		Zoltán Jekelfalussy de Jekel- és Margitfalva, Governor	
Status indeterminate (Principal Allied and Associated Powers control)
28 October 1918 to 17 November 1918		Antonio Grossich, President of the Italian National Council of Fiume	
29 October 1918 to 17 November 1918		Rikard Lenac, Administrator	Veliki župan, appointed on behalf of the State of Slovenes, Croats and Serbs; in opposition
Italian/Allied suzerainty
17 November 1918 to 8 September 1920		Antonio Grossich, President of the Italian National Council of Fiume	
17 November 1918 to 29 November 1918		Enrico Asinari di San Marzo, Military Governor	
29 November 1918 to 28 August 1919		Francesco Grazioli, Military Governor	
29 August 1919 to 13 September 1919		Vittorio Emanuele Pittaluga, Military Governor	
14 September 1919 to 8 September 1920		Gabriele D'Annunzio, Commander of the City of Fiume	
Italian Regency of Carnaro
8 September 1920 to 29 December 1920		Gabriele D'Annunzio, Primo Rettore	First Chancellor; ousted by the Royal Italian Army during the Bloody Christmas
29 December 1920 to 31 December 1920		Riccardo Gigante, President of the Municipal Council of Fiume	
31 December 1920	Establishment of the Free State of Fiume, according to the Treaty of Rapallo		
Free State of Fiume
31 December 1920 to 27 April 1921		Antonio Grossich, Chairman of the Provisional Government of the State	
27 April 1921 to 28 April 1921		Riccardo Gigante, President of the Provisional Directory of Fiume	
28 April 1921 to 13 June 1921		Salvatore Bellasich, Commissioner Extraordinary	
13 June 1921 to 21 September 1921		Antonio Foschini, High Commissioner	Appointed on behalf of the Kingdom of Italy
21 September 1921 to 5 October 1921		Luigi Amantea, High Commissioner	Appointed on behalf of the Kingdom of Italy
5 October 1921 to 4 March 1922		Riccardo Zanella, President	Deposed in a Fascist coup d'état; in Yugoslavia exile to 16 March 1924
4 March 1922 to 9 March 1922		Attilio Prodam, President of Committee of National Defense	
9 March 1922 to 4 April 1922		Giovanni Giuriati, Provisional President	
4 April 1922 to 17 September 1923		Attilio Depoli, Provisional Head of State	
17 September 1923 to 16 March 1924		Gaetano Giardino, Military Governor	Appointed on behalf of the Kingdom of Italy
16 March 1924	Incorporated into the Kingdom of Italy as the Province of Fiume, according to the Treaty of Rome		
Province of Fiume (Italian suzerainty)
16 March 1924 to 30 April 1924		Gaetano Giardino, Prefect	
1 May 1924 to 10 February 1925		Michele Sorge, Prefect	
10 February 1925 to 16 May 1930		Emanuele Vivorio, Prefect	
16 May 1930 to 20 January 1934		Antonio De Biase, Prefect	
20 January 1934 to 20 February 1938		Francesco Turbacco, Prefect	
20 February 1938 to 1 February 1943		Temistocle Testa, Prefect	
1 February 1943 to 20 August 1943		Agostino Podestà, Prefect	
20 August 1943 to 21 September 1943		Pietro Chiariotti, Prefect	Under German occupation from 9 September 1943, following the Armistice of Cassibile
German occupation
21 September 1943 to 29 October 1943		Riccardo Gigante, Prefect	Appointed on behalf of the Italian Social Republic
29 October 1943 to 25 April 1945		Alessandro Spalatin, Prefect	Appointed on behalf of the Italian Social Republic
29 October 1943 to 1945		Franjo Špehar, Extraordinary Commissioner for Sušak–Krk Administrative Commissariat and Vice Prefect Trieste	Appointed on behalf of the Independent State of Croatia
1943 to 1944		Karl Pachneck, Berater	Advisor
1944 to 1945		Wilhelm Rassmann, Berater	Advisor
24 April 1945	Liberated by the Yugoslav Army (Fiume city liberated on 3 May 1945)		
10 February 1947	Formally ceded to the SFR Yugoslavia by the Italian Republic, according to the Paris Peace Treaty. Incorporated into the SFR Yugoslavia as part of the SR Croatia; renamed Rijeka		
