= Icilio Bacci =

Italian irredentist and Fascist politician

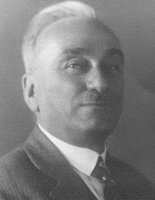

Senator of the Kingdom of Italy
- In office 2 June 1934 – 5 August 1943
- President of the Province of Fiume
- In office 1929–1935

Personal details
- Born: 2 July 1879 Fiume, Austro-Hungarian Empire
- Died: 28 August 1945 (aged 66) (disappeared) Fiume, Kingdom of Italy
- Party: National Fascist Party

Military service
- Allegiance: Kingdom of Italy
- Branch/service: Royal Italian Army
- Years of service: 1915–1918
- Battles/wars: World War I
- Awards: War Merit Cross; Order of the Crown of Italy; Order of Saints Maurice and Lazarus

Icilio Bacci, born Icilio Baccich (2 July 1879 in Fiume – disappeared 28 August 1945), was an Italian irredentist and Fascist politician, member of the Senate of the Kingdom of Italy.

== Biography ==
Born into a large family of Italian nationalist traditions (he had eleven brothers and sisters, and he and all his brothers were given names beginning with "I" for "Italy"), from his youth he was one of the leading members of the Fiuman irredentism, being among the founder of the irredentist association La Giovane Fiume in 1904. After three years as a member of Fiume's municipal council, in 1910 he was appointed deputy mayor of the city, and in the same year he travelled to Rome, where he became one of the founders of the Italian Nationalist Association. In 1911 La Giovane Fiume was dissolved and he was forced to leave Fiume due to his irredentist activities; in 1913 he returned and founded a pro-Italian newspaper, Il Giorno, which was also shut down by order of the Austro-Hungarian authorities and he was forced to leave the city again. During the First World War he volunteered for the Royal Italian Army along with his younger brothers Ipparco (who was killed in action in 1916) and Iti, and after the end of the war he participated in Gabriele D'Annunzio's occupation of Fiume in 1919-1920 together with Iti, being appointed Minister of the Interior and Justice of the Regency of Carnaro.

Following the annexation of Fiume by Italy in 1924, he "Italianized" his surname in Bacci and joined the National Fascist Party. From 1929 to 1935 he served as president of the province of Fiume, and on 23 January 1934 he was made a Senator of the Kingdom of Italy. He remained in Fiume during World War II, without participating in political life (unlike fellow Fiuman senator and irredentist Riccardo Gigante, he did not join the Italian Social Republic), and refused to leave the city even when it was occupied by the Yugoslav People's Liberation Army in May 1945. On 28 August 1945 he was arrested by the OZNA and was never seen again. According to some reports, he was tried and executed in the Karlovac prison in late 1945 or 1946, while according to others he was executed in Fiume shortly after his arrest. His body was never found.
