= Podhum massacre =

1942 mass murder of Croat civilians

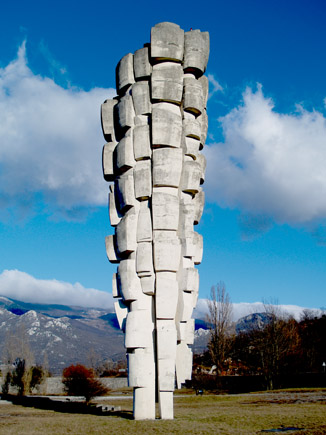
- 1970 memorial, designed by Šime Vulas, commemorating the 1942 massacre.
- Location: Podhum, near Rijeka
- Date: 12 July 1942
- Target: Croats
- Attack type: Mass murder, reprisals
- Deaths: 91-118
- Perpetrator: Italian Fascist militia

The Podhum massacre was the mass murder of Croat civilians by Italian occupation forces on 12 July 1942, in the village of Podhum, in retaliation for an earlier Partisan attack.

== Background ==
Axis forces, including Italy, invaded and defeated the Kingdom of Yugoslavia in April 1941. Following its defeat, various Yugoslav territories were occupied and annexed by the Axis powers; Mussolini's Italy gained most of Slovenia, Kosovo, coastal and inland areas of the Croatian Littoral and large chunks of the coastal Dalmatia region (along with nearly all of the Adriatic islands and the Bay of Kotor). It also gained control over the Italian governorate of Montenegro, and was granted the kingship in the Independent State of Croatia, though wielding little real power within it; although it did (alongside Germany) maintain a de facto zone of influence within the borders of the NDH.

Resistance, led primarily by the Yugoslav Partisans, began almost immediately, with the formation of the 1st Sisak Partisan Detachment, the first armed anti-fascist resistance unit formed by a resistance movement in occupied Yugoslavia during World War II. Founded in the Brezovica Forest near Sisak, Croatia, its creation marked the beginning of anti-Axis resistance in occupied Yugoslavia.

== Prelude ==
The small village of Podhum became absorbed into the Italian Province of Fiume in 1941, with the capital city of the region being nearby Fiume. The prefect of the region and surrounding area was Blackshirt Colonel, Temistocle Testa. Testa was known for threatening harsh reprisals in towns and villages for refusing to collaborate with Italian forces.

One such example of a local atrocity, ordered by Testa prior to the massacre at Podhum, was the shooting of 34 innocent villagers in the nearby village of Jelenje, at the end of February 1942.

On 23 March 1942, Testa proclaimed that any persons withholding knowledge of the location and activities of local Partisans from Italian authorities would face "heavy punishment".

In essence, such harsh actions and threats were a continuation of the "Circular 3C" policy, implemented by Italian general, Mario Roatta, to quell Partisan resistance. These measures included the tactics of "summary executions, hostage-taking, reprisals, internments and the burning of houses and villages."

== Timeline ==
The exact reason for the Italian retaliation against Podhum has never been established. Testa himself claimed it was in retaliation for the deaths of 16 Italian soldiers killed by Partisans, allegedly from Podhum, at the beginning of July. Others believe that the massacre was in retaliation for the killing of four Italian citizens, including a teacher and his wife, in June, and that Prefect Testa gave the order to carry reprisal killings on local citizens to avenge these Italian deaths.

On the morning of July 12, 1942, 250 Italian soldiers of the 2nd Blackshirt Battalion "Emiliano", under the command of Italian Blackshirt Major Armando Giorleo, entered Podhum, rounding up all 'military age' males that were between the ages of 16 and 64, which amounted to an estimated 91 people. During this round-up, it is reported that roughly 14 people resisting arrest were executed on the spot. The remaining captives were then marched to an open field south of the village. At this spot, they were brought to the edge of a small dirt pit in successive groups of five where they were then shot with rifles and thrown into the pit. This continued until all the victims had been killed.

The number of men and boys killed has not quite been determined. Village documents indicate that upwards of 91 people from the area were executed in these reprisal killings. On the other hand, the 1946 "Report on Italian War Crimes against Yugoslavia and its people" noted that 118 civilians were killed during the massacre. Jozo Tomasevich cites that "over 100" men from the village were killed.

== Aftermath ==
Italian forces gathered and deported the remaining inhabitants (primarily the elderly, women and children), numbering 889 civilians, (208 men, 269 women and 412 children) to concentration camps in Italy, such as the Fraschette concentration camp, near Frosinone, where most were held until the end of 1943.

The village of Podhum itself was then burned down by the Italian forces, with 494 homes and buildings being destroyed and 2,000 heads of livestock seized.
