= Riccardo Gigante =

Italian politician

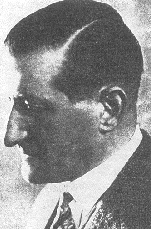

Senator of the Kingdom of Italy
- In office 24 February 1934 – 5 August 1943
- Governor of the Province of Fiume
- In office 21 October 1943 – 29 November 1943
- Preceded by: Pietro Chiariotti
- Succeeded by: Alessandro Spalatin

Mayor of Fiume
- In office 11 November 1919 – 25 December 1920

Mayor of Fiume
- In office January 1930 – February 1934

Personal details
- Born: 29 January 1881 Fiume, Austro-Hungarian Empire
- Died: 4 May 1945 (aged 64) Kastav, Democratic Federal Yugoslavia
- Cause of death: Execution by firing squad
- Party: National Fascist Party; Republican Fascist Party

Military service
- Allegiance: Kingdom of Italy
- Branch/service: Royal Italian Army
- Years of service: 1915–1918
- Rank: Captain
- Battles/wars: World War I
- Awards: War Cross for Military Valor; Military Cross; Order of the Crown of Italy; Order of Saints Maurice and Lazarus

Riccardo Gigante (29 January 1881 – 4 May 1945) was an Italian irredentist and Fascist politician, who played an important role in the history of Fiume during the interwar period and the Fascist era.

== Biography ==
He was born in Fiume when the city was part of the Austro-Hungarian Empire, and after graduation he started a career as a journalist; in 1907, at the age of 26, he became director of the magazine La Giovane Fiume, printed by the homonymous Italian irredentist association of Fiume. In 1910 he became president of the association, and was repeatedly persecuted by the Austro-Hungarian authorities for his pro-Italian stance. In 1915 he volunteered for the Royal Italian Army during the First World War (despite a severe form of arthritis that afflicted him, resulting in the exemption from military service in the Austro-Hungarian Army and the initial rejection of his enlistment request by the Italian Army), serving as a guide, translator and intelligence officer on the Isonzo Front and earning a War Cross for Military Valor by Italy and a Military Cross by the United Kingdom (as well as a death sentence in absentia for treason by Austria-Hungary), ending the war with the rank of captain in 1917.

After the end of the war he held the office of mayor of Fiume from November 1919 to December 1920, during the occupation of the city by the "legionnaires" of Gabriele D'Annunzio, whom Gigante befriended; when the Italian Army attacked D'Annunzio's troops in the so-called "Bloody Christmas", Gigante resigned from his post as a mayor to take part in the fighting, and later sheltered D'Annunzio in his house and was part of the delegation that negotiated the ceasefire, along with Giovanni Host-Venturi. A staunch Italian nationalist and an advocate of the annexation of the city to Italy, Gigante strongly opposed the Autonomist Party and soon became close to the nascent Fascist movement (albeit not with its leader Benito Mussolini, whom he held in low esteem and would have liked to see replaced by D'Annunzio); in 1921, when the Autonomist Party won the local elections, he led a group of squadristi and former "legionnaires" in an assault on the polling station and later occupied the town hall and assumed "dictatorial powers" for thirty-six hours, before ceding power to an extraordinary commissioner appointed by the Italian government. Following the annexation of the city to Italy in 1924, he joined the National Fascist Party (on the same year he was awarded the Order of the Crown of Italy motu proprio by King Victor Emmanuel III) and from January 1930 to February 1934 he held once again the position of mayor of Fiume; he was then he made a Senator of the Kingdom of Italy in February 1934, and in January 1937 he became president of the Società di Navigazione Fiumana (Fiuman Shipping Company).

After the Armistice of Cassibile he joined the Italian Social Republic and was appointed governor of the province of Fiume, a post he however only held for five weeks as the German occupation authorities soon replaced him with someone more to the liking of the Ustashe. Having remained in Fiume even in the face of the arrival of the Yugoslav People's Liberation Army, on 3 May 1945, he was immediately arrested by the OZNA and executed by firing squad on the next day in the woods near Kastav. He was buried in a mass grave which was located in 1992 and excavated in 2018, when his remains were identified through DNA testing and repatriated. In 2020 he was reburied in Gabriele D’Annunzio's mausoleum at the Vittoriale degli Italiani in Gardone Riviera; D'Annunzio had chosen Gigante as one of the ten men who would be buried next to him in the mausoleum, but the grave had remained empty for 75 years.
