= Temistocle (given name) =

Temistocle is an Italian male given name, which is derived from Themistocles. The name may refer to:

- Temistocle Calzecchi-Onesti (1853–1922), Italian physicist
- Temistocle Popa (1921–2013), Romanian composer
- Temistocle Solera (1815–1878), Italian opera composer and librettist
- Temistocle Testa (1897–1949), Italian politician
- Temistocle Zammit (1864–1935), Maltese archaeologist
- Temistocle Zona (1848–1910), Italian astronomer
