= Palazzo Malinverni =

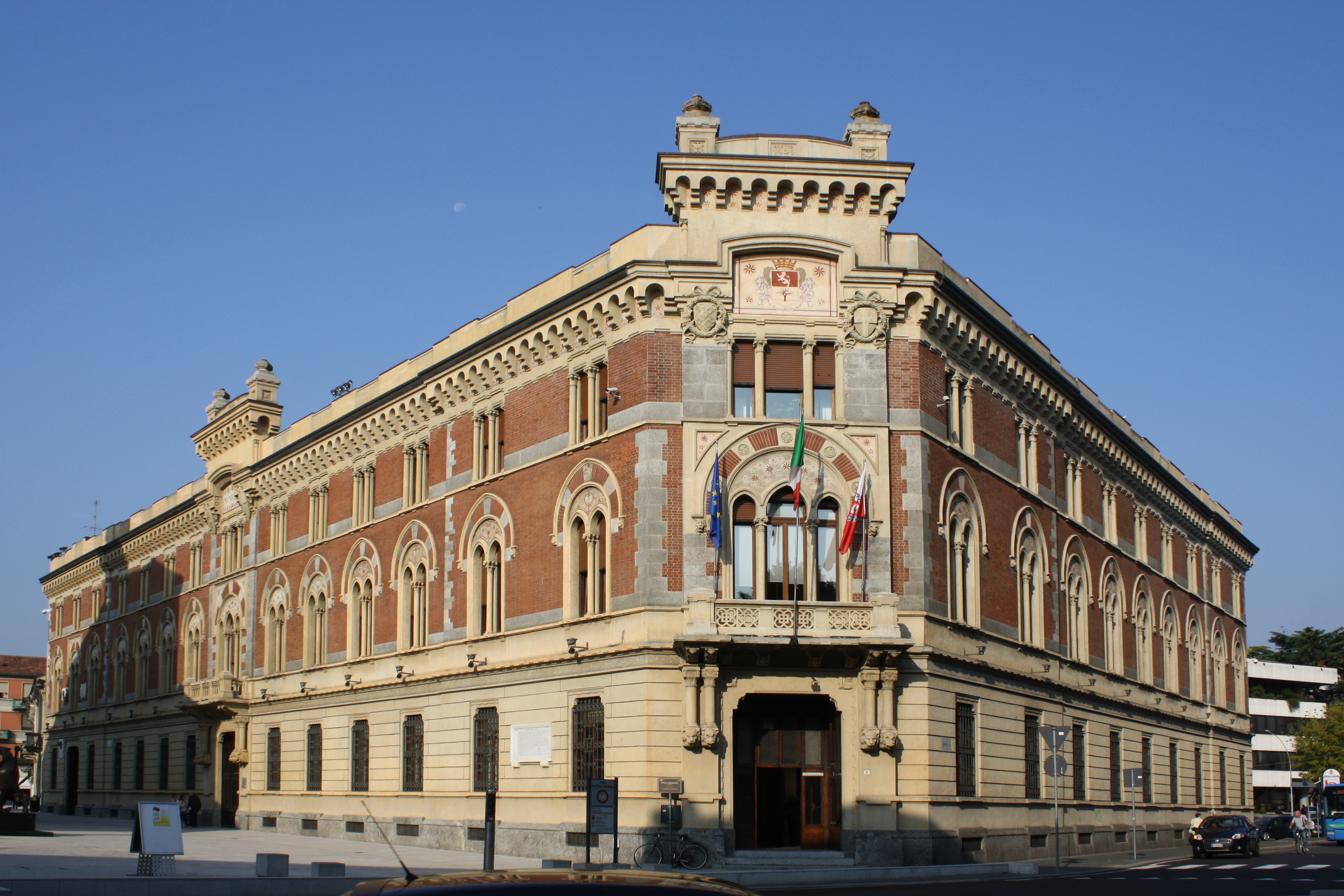
- Interactive map of the Palazzo Malinverni area

General information
- Status: In use
- Type: Palace
- Architectural style: Eclecticism in architecture
- Location: Legnano, Lombardia, Italy, 9, Piazza San Magno
- Coordinates: 45.595362°N 8.91898°E
- Current tenants: seat of the municipal administration
- Construction started: 1908-1909

Design and construction
- Architect: Aristide Malinverni

Palazzo Malinverni is a historical building in Legnano. It is the seat of the Town Hall (building) of the city. It is located in the central Piazza San Magno, next to the homonymous Basilica and was inaugurated on 28 November 1909, during the city's period of greatest growth — industrial and demographic.

== History ==
The first seat of Legnano's town hall was a building in Piazza Grande (the modern Piazza San Magno) at no. 52. The process that led to the design of Legnano's new town hall began in 1904, with the publication of the competition notice. The latter envisaged the design of a three-storey building with a decreasing height starting from the ground floor and rising towards the attic: 5 m, 4.8 m and 3.5 m. Two entrances were planned, the main one towards the modern largo Franco Tosi and the secondary entrance, which would give onto via Bernardino Luini.

The town hall was to be provided with a council chamber large enough to accommodate the seats of 40 councillors, members of the municipal council, the mayor, the secretary and the public. In addition, rooms were planned that would have housed the porter's lodge, the telegraph office, the duty post and the savings bank. It would have had underground rooms and the total number of rooms would have been 30.

The projects that ranked in the top three places would be given a prize of 1,000, 500 and 250 litre respectively. A total expenditure of 100,000 lire was planned. It was then built from 1908 to 1909 to a design by architect Aristide Malinverni with a total expenditure that turned out to be three times the budgeted.

== Description ==
It has a medieval architecture style with exposed brickwork and bifore windows to which are added parts that recall other architectural styles such as Art Nouveau and neo-Renaissance. The upper cornice is decorated with the coats of arms of the municipalities that were part of the Lombard League and with those of the provincial capitals, including the coats of arms of the Pola, Fiume and Zara, which belonged to Italy between the two world wars. The coats of arms — created in graffito by the Ghiringhelli brothers — of the 100 cities of Italy that have been depicted in the Council Chamber and the paintings — on the first floor — by Ettore Falchi and Ernesto Crespi are valuable from an artistic point of view.

== Sources ==
=== Italian sources ===
- Autori vari, Il Palio di Legnano : Sagra del Carroccio e Palio delle Contrade nella storia e nella vita della città, Banca di Legnano, 2015, SBN IT\ICCU\TO0\1145476.
- Giorgio D'Ilario, Egidio Gianazza, Augusto Marinoni, Marco Turri, Profilo storico della città di Legnano, Edizioni Landoni, 1984, SBN IT\ICCU\RAV\0221175.
- Gabriella Ferrarini, Marco Stadiotti, Legnano. Una città, la sua storia, la sua anima, Telesio editore, 2001, SBN IT\ICCU\RMR\0096536.
