= Corpus separatum (Fiume) =

City of Fiume under the Kingdom of Hungary (1779–1918)

Coordinates: 45°20′N 14°26′E

City of Fiume and its District Fiume város és kerülete (Hungarian) Stadt Fiume mit Gebiet (German) Città di Fiume e dintorni (Italian) Grad Rijeka i okolica (Croatian)
- 1779–1918
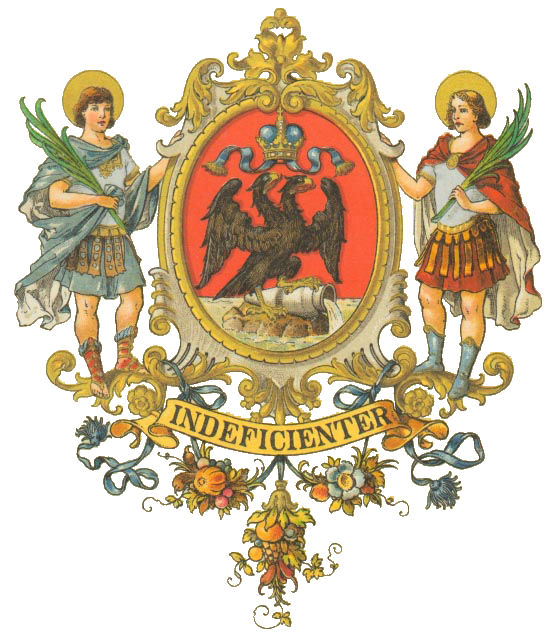
- Flag Coat of arms
- Motto: Indeficienter (Latin) Inexhaustible (without deficiency)
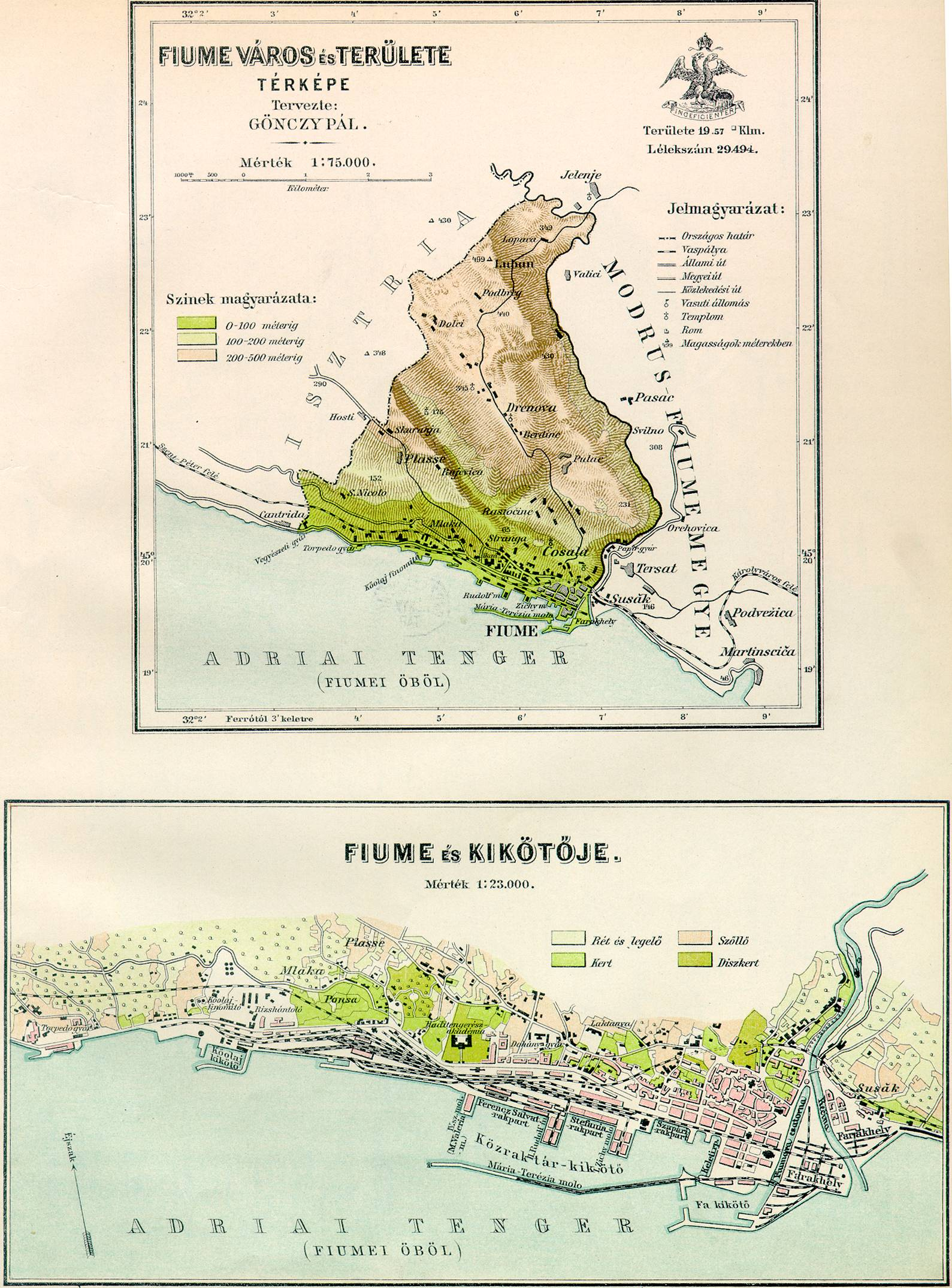
- Territory of the corpus separatum before 1918
- Status: Corpus separatum of the Kingdom of Hungary; Part of the Illyrian Provinces (1809–1816) and the Kingdom of Illyria (1816–1822); Part of the Kingdom of Croatia (1849–1868)
- Capital: Fiume (Rijeka)
- Common languages: Italian; Croatian; Slovene; Hungarian; German
- Religion: Roman Catholicism; Calvinism; Lutheranism; Eastern Orthodoxy; Judaism
- Governor
  - 1779–1783: József Majláth
  - 1917–1918: Zoltán Jekelfalussy
- Historical era: Late modern Europe; World War I
  - Established: 23 April 1779
  - French occupation: 5 April – 17 October 1797
  - French occupation: 3 October 1805 – 1806
  - Incorporation into Croatia: 31 August 1848
  - Settlement of 1868: 17 November 1868
  - Termination of Hungarian suzerainty: 29 October 1918
  - Treaty of Trianon: 4 June 1920

Area
- 1869: 19.57 km^{2} (7.56 sq mi)
- 1880: 19.57 km^{2} (7.56 sq mi)
- 1890: 19.57 km^{2} (7.56 sq mi)
- 1900: 21 km^{2} (8.1 sq mi)
- 1910: 21 km^{2} (8.1 sq mi)

Population
  - 1869: 17,884
  - 1880: 20,981
  - 1890: 29,494
  - 1900: 38,057
  - 1910: 49,608
- Currency: Gulden (1779–1892); Krone (1892–1918)
Preceded by	Succeeded by
Kingdom of Croatia (Habsburg)	Italian Regency of Carnaro
- Today part of: Croatia

Corpus separatum, a Latin term meaning "separated body", refers to the status of the City of Fiume (modern Rijeka, Croatia) while given a special legal and political status different from its environment under the rule of the Kingdom of Hungary. Formally known as City of Fiume and its District (Hungarian: Fiume város és kerülete), it was instituted by Empress Maria Theresa in 1779, determining the semi-autonomous status of Fiume within the Habsburg monarchy until the fall of the Austro-Hungarian Empire in 1918.

== Origins ==
Maria Theresa, with her sovereign decision of 2 October 1776, gave up possession of Fiume, which for a long time was administered with the adjacent hereditary Inner Austrian fiefs of the Habsburgs within the Holy Roman Empire, and gave it to the Kingdom of Hungary, of which she was also queen, with a view of fostering trade. Since Hungary proper was some 500 kilometres (310 mi) away, the city was initially annexed to the Habsburg Kingdom of Croatia, whose territory began east of the city walls. Croatia was ruled in personal union with Hungary since 1102, and with it formed the Lands of the Crown of Saint Stephen.

Two and a half years later, Maria Theresa, in her capacity as Queen of Hungary, by a royal rescript dated 23 April 1779, made the City of Fiume directly subject to the Hungarian Crown as a corpus separatum (that is, not as a part of Croatia, which was in a personal union with Hungary). Since Fiume had to serve a similar function for Hungary as the Imperial Free City of Trieste did for the Habsburg lands, the Hungarian estates (and probably the Queen) wanted to grant the City a similar degree of institutional autonomy to that already enjoyed by Trieste. According to Maria Theresa's rescript, Fiume was created a corpus separatum – that is, a political body with greater autonomy than a Free imperial city or a Hungarian county, and a territory comparable to the other partes adnexae constituting the Crown of St Stephen. The city's position was thus comparable to those of the regna: as Trieste was considered to be a crown land of the Austrian hereditary lands (Erblande), so Fiume was considered to be a pars adnexa to the crown.

After the royal rescript of 23 April 1779, the stage was set for all the political confrontations that were to happen in Fiume for more than a century and a half. In a sense, it can be said that all history that followed was a long footnote on how to interpret the two acts of 1776 and 1779. The act presented a precedent for the Hungarian constitutional praxis, since it was the first time that a part of the Holy Roman Empire (and a hereditary fief of the Habsburgs) was given to the Hungarian-Croatian kingdom. Therefore, since the Croatian and Hungarian estates had widely diverging interests with respect to Fiume, they produced very different interpretations of the rescript. The Croatians refused to accept the Hungarian reading of the document - they denied that the City could have been excluded from the surrounding territory, that was already framed into a comitatus.

During the Napoleonic Wars, the city was briefly part of the Illyrian Provinces, ending its status as corpus separatum. Fiume returned to the Hungarian Crown in 1822; after the Revolution of 1848 and the enactment of the Austrian March Constitution, the city was included in the autonomous Croatian kingdom as a seat of a comitatus with no special autonomy.

== Croatian–Hungarian Agreement ==
In 1868, following the Austro-Hungarian Compromise of 1867 which created Austria-Hungary, Croatia was allowed to negotiate its own settlement with Hungary. The final Croatian–Hungarian Settlement left the possession of Fiume unsettled, pending future negotiations according to article 66, as it appeared in the Croatian version, while in the Hungarian version Fiume was declared a Corpus separatum directly connected to the Lands of the Crown of Saint Stephen and therefore not falling within the domain of Croatian autonomy within the kingdom, but within the domain of the joint Hungarian parliament and government. Understandably, each parliament signed its respective treaty, but when the two versions went to Emperor Franz Joseph I for signing, a piece of paper (the Kriptic) containing a Croatian translation of the Hungarian claim to Fiume had been pasted over the Croatian version. The settlement was defined as provisory. For a definitive settlement, an agreement from Hungary, Croatia and Fiume was necessary and was never achieved up to the dissolution of Austria-Hungary in October 1918.

== Corpus separatum (1870–1918) ==
The administration of the Corpus separatum was settled with the Statute given on 17 April 1872 by the Hungarian Minister of the Interior. At the top of Fiume and its district (Hungarian: Fiume város és kerülete) there was the Governor appointed directly from the King after a proposal from the Hungarian Prime Minister. The Governor of Fiume was entitled to membership in the House of Magnates. The municipal self-rule was entrusted to a Rappresentanza of 56 members whose mandate lasted 6 years. The citizens had the right to elect their representative at the House of Representatives. From 1896 onwards the Hungarian Government reduced the scope of municipal autonomy that was practically ended by 1913.

Fiume and the district administered as a corpus separatum had a total area of 21 square kilometres (8.1 sq mi) and comprised the City and three villages:

- Cosala (Italian) or Kozala (Croatian)
- Drenova (Italian and Croatian)
- Plasse (Italian) or Plase (Croatian)

== After 1918 ==
The territory of Fiume after the end of World War I was involved in a series of events that, after various military occupations (the longest lasting was the one led by Gabriele D'Annunzio, also called the Italian Regency of Carnaro), saw the creation of an ephemeral successor entity in the Free State of Fiume.

The Free State existed officially 4 years, before it was militarily occupied and eventually annexed to the Kingdom of Italy as part of the Province of Fiume in 1924, annexation that marked the end of the historic Fiuman autonomy.

== Demographics ==
In 1900, the corpus separatum had a population of 38,955 people and by 1910, the population increased to 49,608. According to the census taken by the Italian National Council of Fiume (Italian: Consiglio Nazionale Italiano di Fiume) in December 1918 after Italian army captured the city of Fiume, following the World War I the population dropped to 45,885. It had the following composition identified by association with linguistic communities:

Linguistically determined composition of the Corpus separatum
Ethnicity	1900	1910	1918
Italian*	N/A	23,283 (46.94%)	28,911 (62.5%)
Croatian**	7,497 (19.3%)	15,731 (31.71%)	9,092 (19.6%)
Slovene*	N/A	3,973 (7.94%)	1,674 (3.6%)
Hungarian	2,842 (7.3%)	3,619 (7.29%)	4,431 (9.6%)
German	1,945 (5.0%)	2,476 (4.99%)	1,616 (3.5%)
English*	N/A	202 (0.41%)	N/A
Czech-Moravian*	N/A	185 (0.37%)	N/A
Serbian	55 (0.1%)	70 (0.14%)	N/A
French*	N/A	40 (0.08%)	N/A
Polish*	N/A	36 (0.07%)	N/A
Romanian	23 (0.0%)	29 (0.06%)	N/A
Slovak	29 (0.0%)	N/A	N/A
Other*	26,564 (68.2%)	N/A	N/A
*1900 census does not identify linguistic groups marked with an asterisk specifically **1910 census identifies the group as Croatian-Ilyrians

According to the census of 1900, the county was composed of the following religious communities:

Total:

- Roman Catholic: 36,104 (92.7%)
- Jewish: 1,172 (3.0%)
- Greek Orthodox: 703 (1.8%)
- Calvinist: 423 (1.1%)
- Lutheran: 261 (0.7%)
- Greek Catholic: 73 (0.2%)
- Unitarian: 11 (0.0%)
- Other or unknown: 208 (0.5%)

According to the census of 1910, the county was composed of the following religious communities:

Total:

- Roman Catholic: 45,130 (90.61%)
- Jewish: 1,696 (3.41%)
- Calvinist: 1,123 (2.25%)
- Greek Orthodox: 995 (2.0%)
- Greek Catholic: 467 (0.94%)
- Lutheran: 311 (0.62%)
- Unitarian: 16 (0.03%)
- Other or unknown: 68 (0.14%)

== Gallery ==
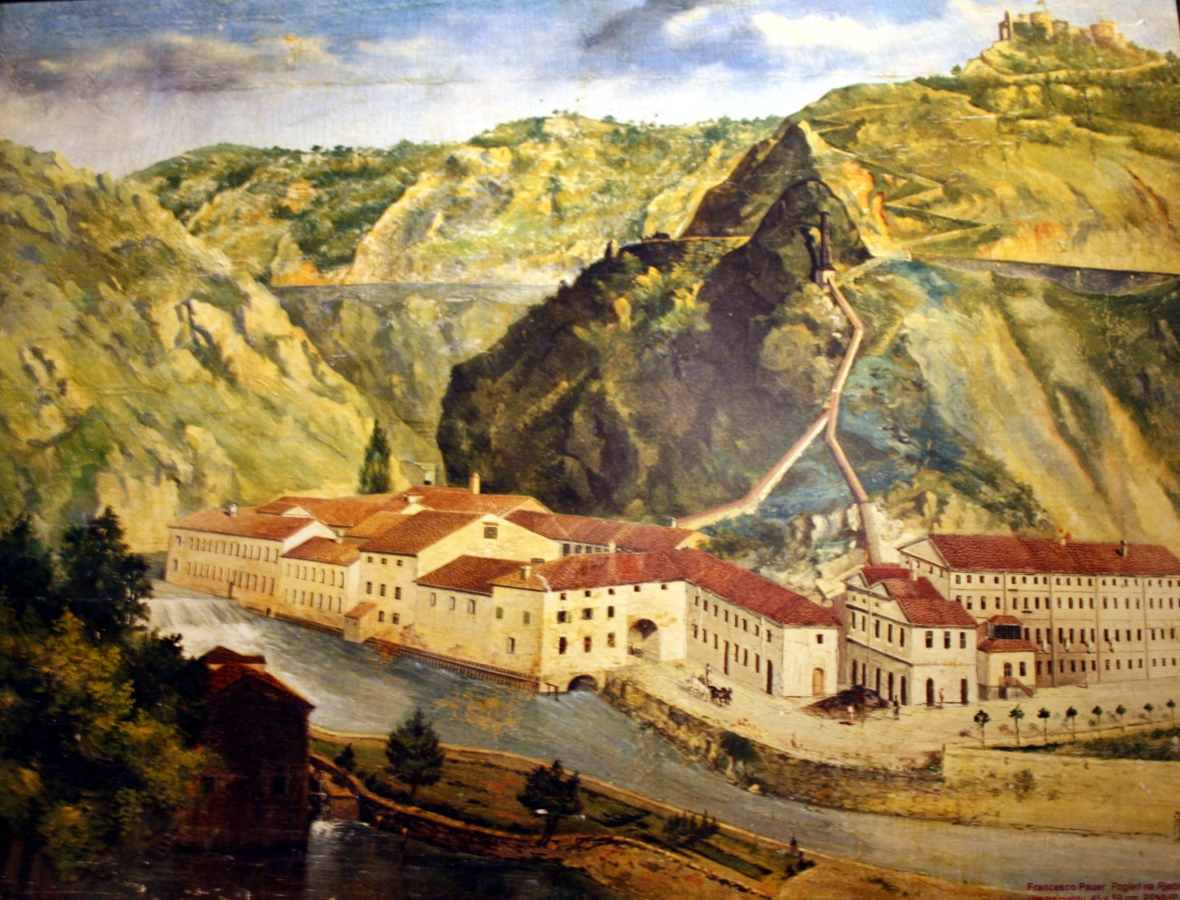
Smith & Meynier Paper Mill c. 1880

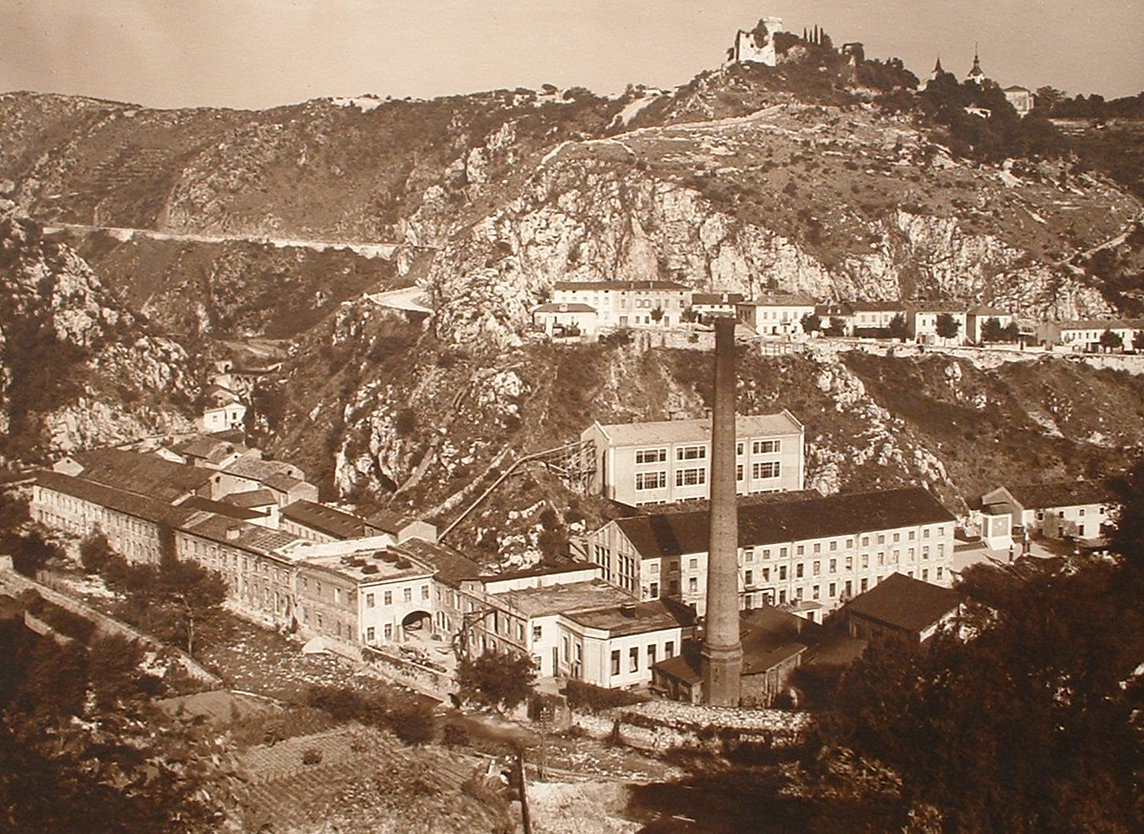
The same mill c. 1900

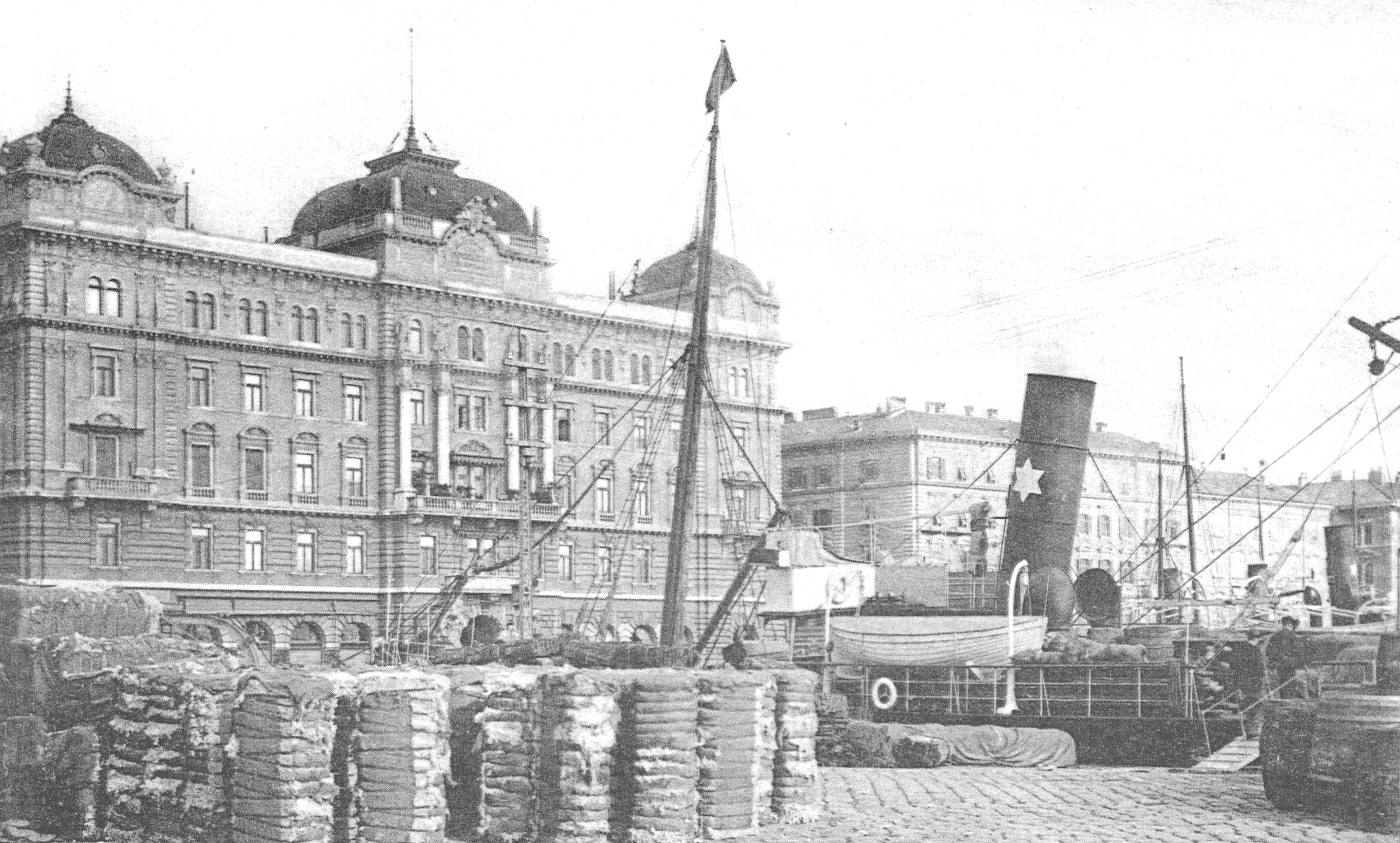
Adria Palace, the headquarters of Adria Royal Hungarian Sea Navigation Company c. 1900

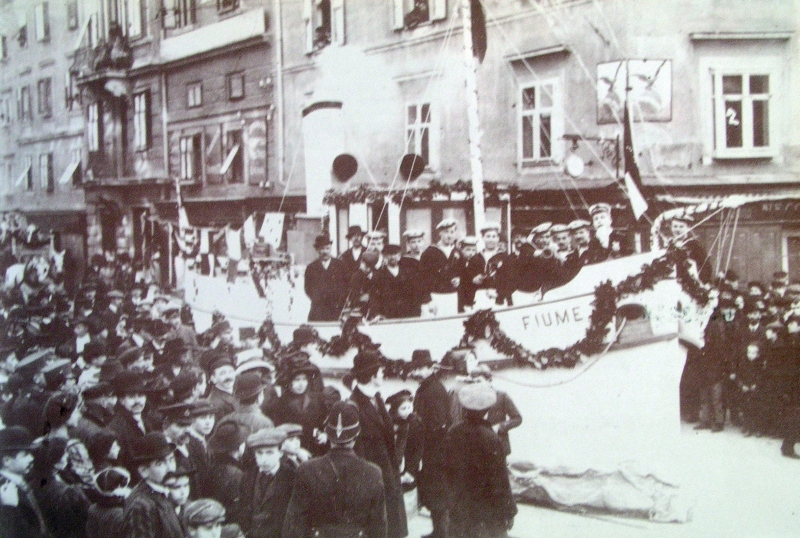
Carnival in Fiume c. 1900

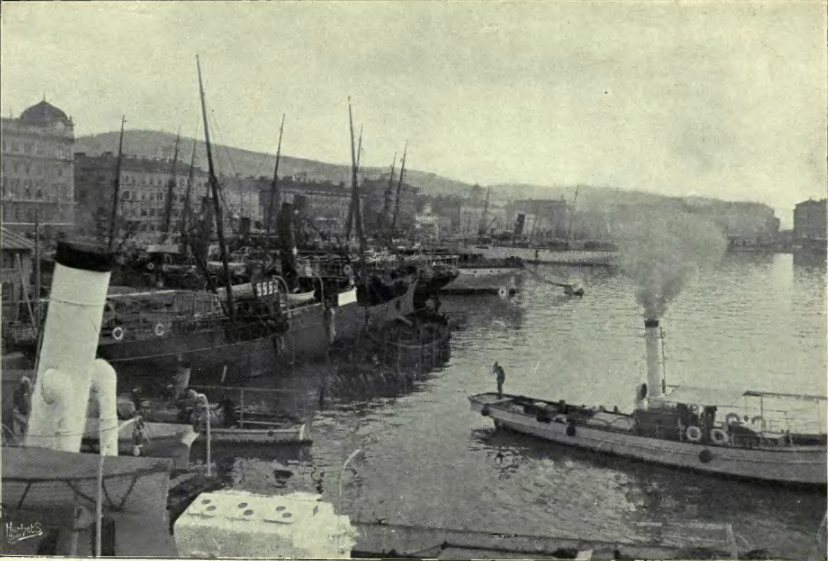
Port of Fiume in 1909

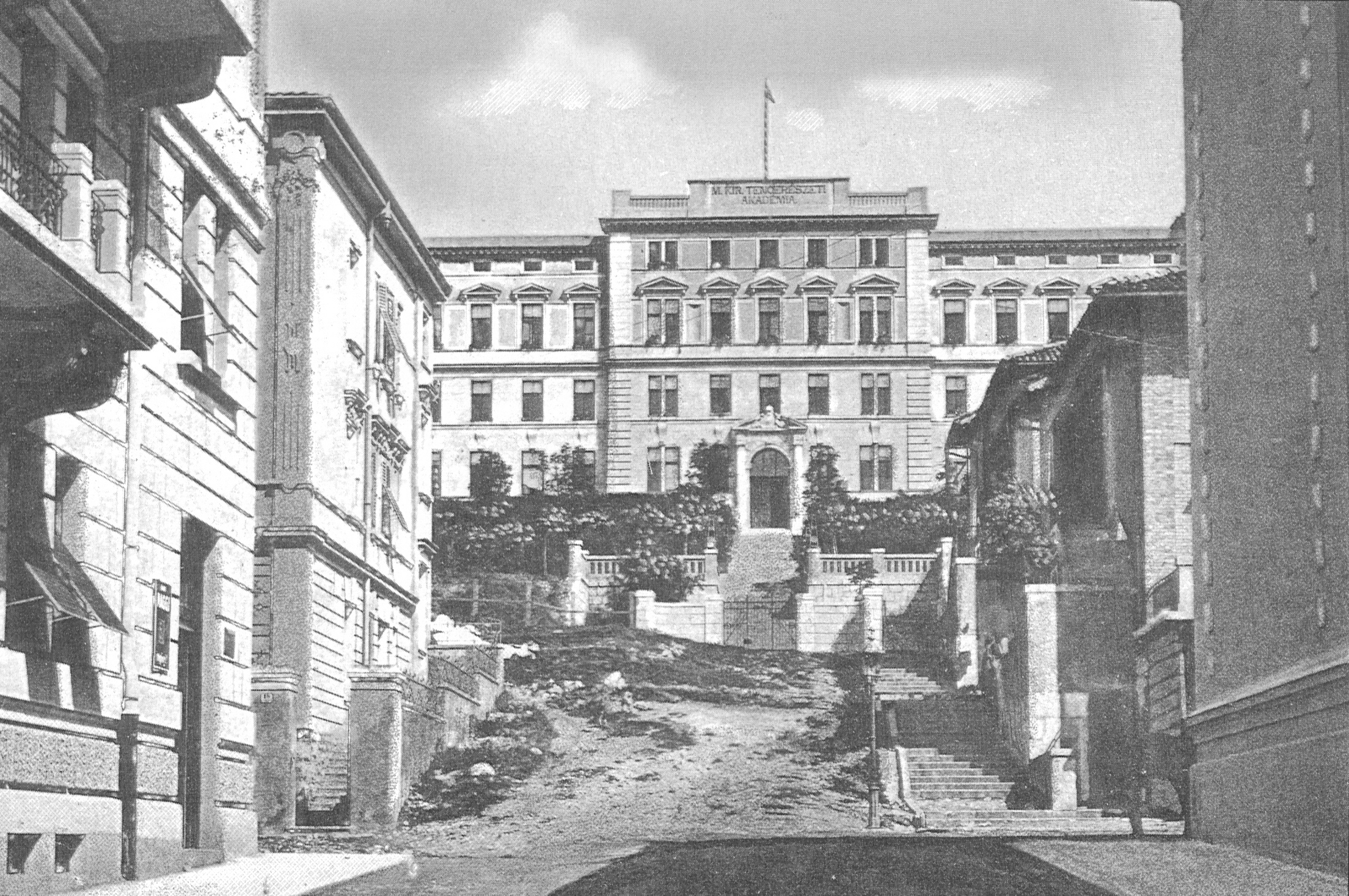
The building of the Royal Hungarian Marine Academy c. 1900

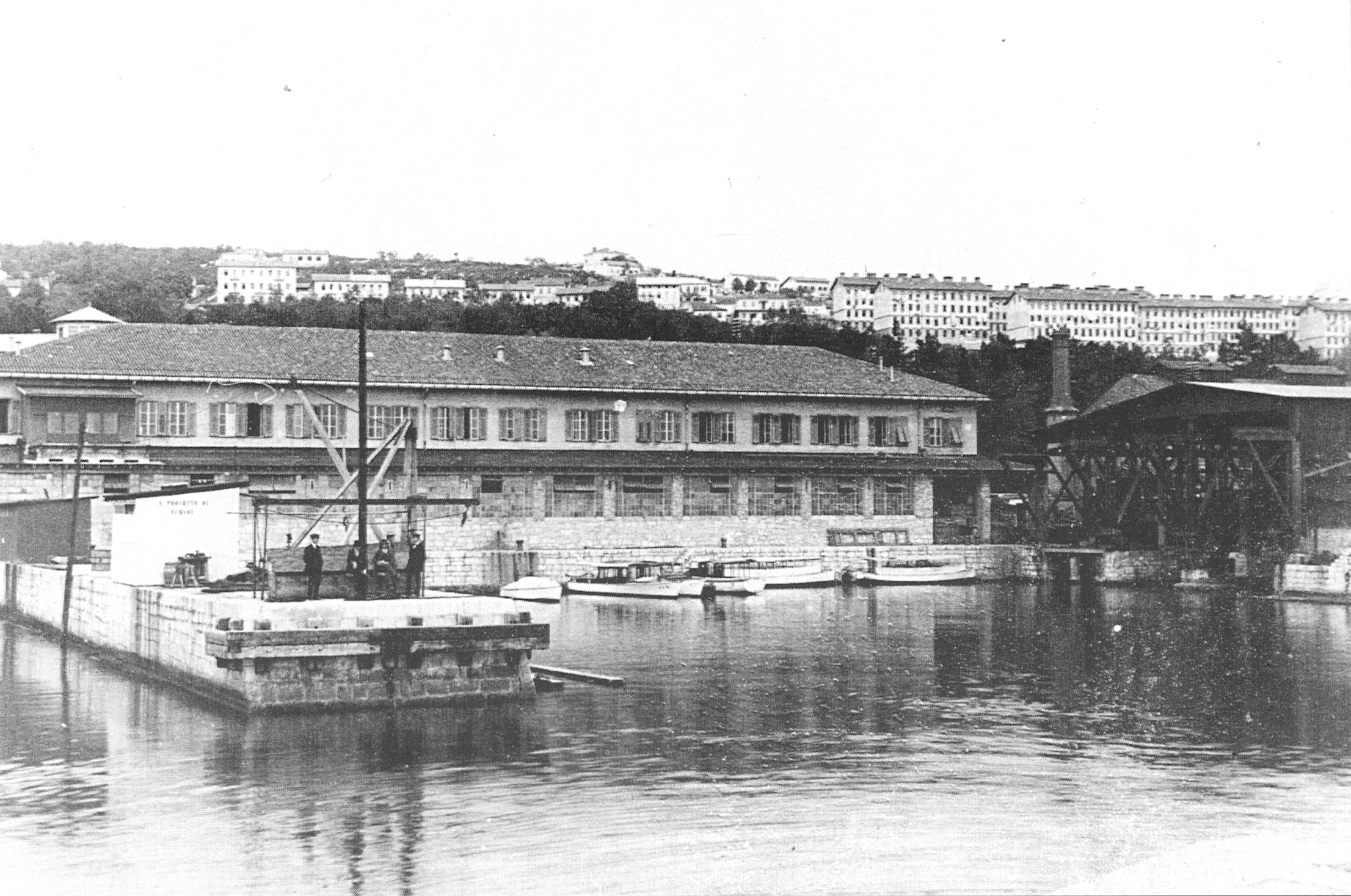
Whitehead Torpedo Works factory in 1910

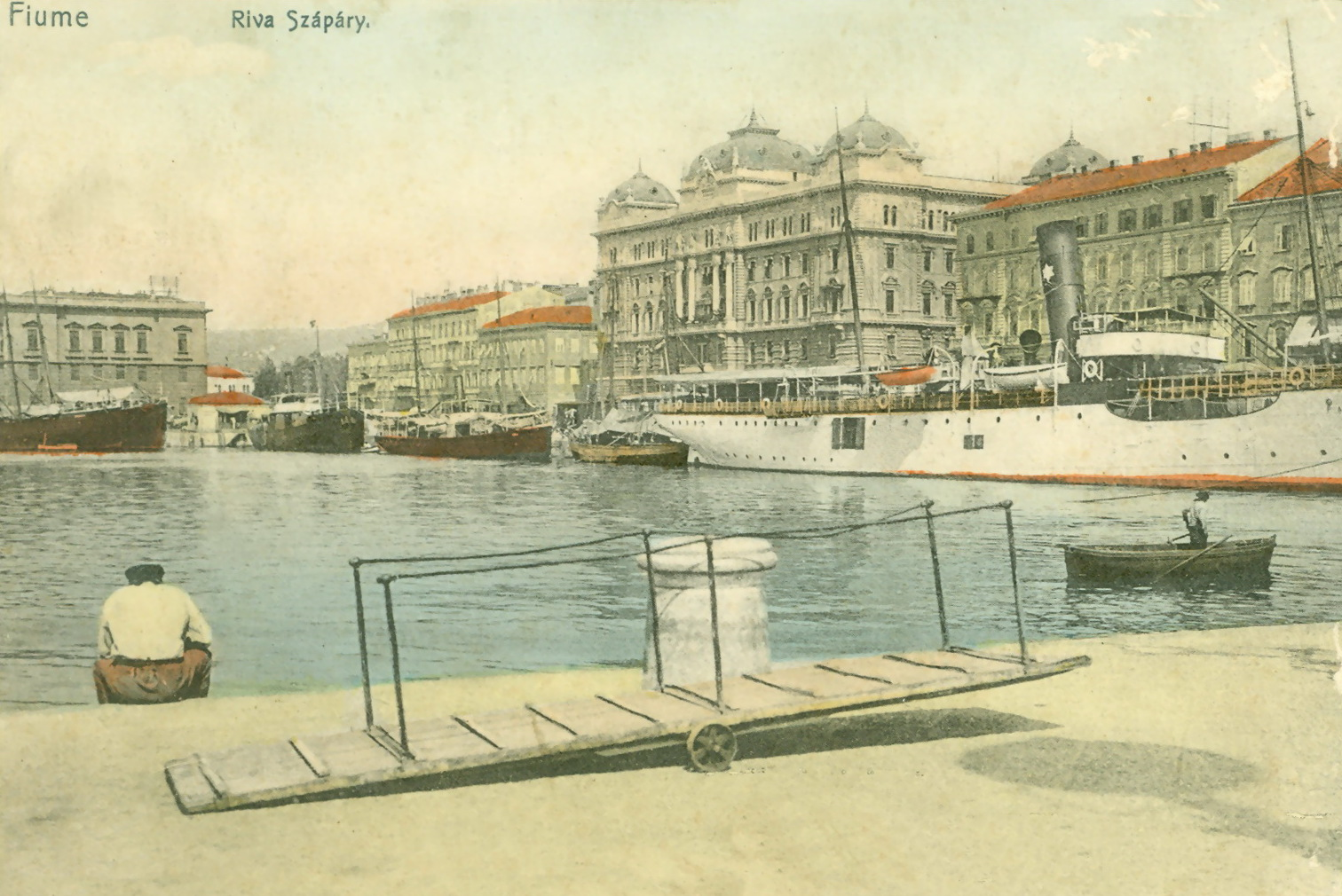
Postcard depicting Szapáry Wharf and the Adria Palace

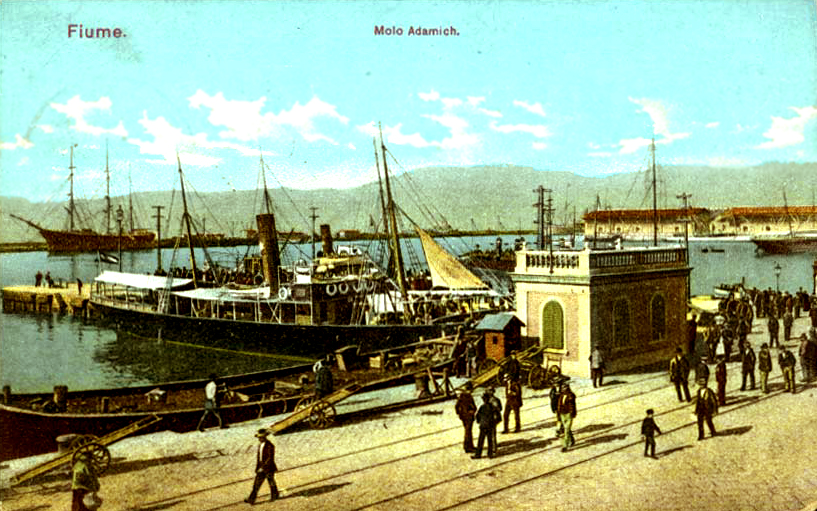
Adamich Pier in 1910

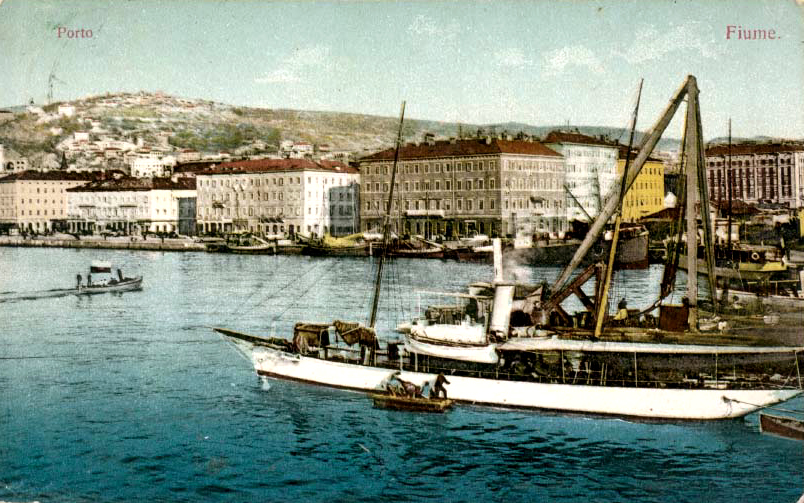
Port of Fiume in 1910

== See also ==
- List of governors and heads of state of Fiume
- History of Rijeka
