= Bloody Christmas (1920) =

Series of clashes in Fiume, Italy in 1920

- Part of Civil unrest in Italy (1919–1926)
Date	24–29 December 1920 (6 days)
Location	Fiume (now Rijeka)
Result	Italian government victory
Territorial changes	Dissolution of the Italian Regency of Carnaro

Belligerents
Kingdom of Italy	Italian Regency of Carnaro

Commanders and leaders
(Kingdom of Italy) Enrico Caviglia	Gabriele D'Annunzio

Strength
8,000 soldiers	2,500 legionnaires

Casualties and losses
25 killed 139 wounded	26 killed 46 wounded
- 7 civilians killed 22 wounded

The Bloody Christmas (Croatian: Riječki krvavi božić; Italian: Natale di sangue) of 1920 was a series of clashes in Fiume (now Rijeka, Croatia), which led to the conclusion of the Fiume campaign that was carried out by the Italian poet, adventurer, and proto-fascist Gabriele D'Annunzio in 1920.

== Background ==
Upon the return of the liberal politician Giovanni Giolitti to the Italian government in June 1920, during the Biennio Rosso, the official attitude towards the Kingdom of Italy's regency of Carnaro, which had been constituted in Fiume, began to waver. On November 12, 1920, the Kingdom of Italy and the Kingdom of the Serbs, Croats, and Slovenes (which was renamed the Kingdom of Yugoslavia in 1929) signed the Treaty of Rapallo, and the Free State of Fiume was formed after the occupation of Fiume by Gabriele d'Annunzio and his troops which began with the Impresa di Fiume. D'Annunzio entered Fiume to protest the incomplete victory after World War I since Italy had been denied some of the eastern Adriatic lands that it claimed had been promised at its entry to the war.

== Occupation ==
The resumption of Italy's premiership by the liberal Giovanni Giolitti in June 1920 signalled a hardening of official attitudes to d'Annunzio's coup. On 12 November, Italy and Yugoslavia concluded the Treaty of Rapallo, under which Fiume was to be an independent state, the Free State of Fiume, under a government acceptable to both. D'Annunzio refused to accept an ultimatum by Italian General Enrico Caviglia to abandon Fiume and claimed the Treaty of Rapallo as illegal and his Regency declared war on Italy.

The Royal Italian Army launched a full-scale attack against Fiume on 24 December 1920: after several hours of intense fighting, a truce was proclaimed for Christmas day; the battle subsequently resumed on 26 December. Since D'Annunzio's legionnaires were refusing to surrender and were strongly resisting the attack using machine guns and grenades, the Italian dreadnoughts Andrea Doria and Duilio opened fired on Fiume and bombed the city for three days. D'Annunzio resigned on 28 December and the Regency capitulated on 30 December 1920, being occupied by Italian forces.

== Following defeat ==
Following the defeat of d'Annunzio's forces, there was an election of the Constituent Assembly, giving autonomists and independentists an overwhelming victory with 65% of the vote. On 5 October 1921, Riccardo Zanella became the first and only elected president of the short lived Free State of Fiume, but that was unable to end disputes over the city.

Seven months later in Rome, Mussolini became prime minister, and Italy started heading towards a fascist regime. As a result, Zanella was overthrown in a putsch by local fascists in March 1922, resulting in an Italian military occupation of the city. The period of diplomatic tension ended with the Treaty of Rome on 27 January 1924, which assigned Fiume to Italy and Sušak along with other villages, to Yugoslavia, with joint port administration.

== See also ==
- Italian irredentism
- Mutilated victory
- Corpus separatum (Fiume)
