= Podhum, Croatia =

Podhum
- Village
- Location within Croatia
- Country: Croatia
- County: Primorje-Gorski Kotar County

Area
  - Total: 1.5 sq mi (3.9 km^{2})

Population (2021)
  - Total: 1,356
  - Density: 900/sq mi (350/km^{2})
- Time zone: UTC+1 (CET)
  - Summer (DST): UTC+2 (CEST)

Podhum is a village in Croatia. It is connected by the D52 highway. During World War II it was the site of the Podhum massacre of Croat civilians by Italian occupation forces; up to 118 people were killed and more than 800 were sent to Italian concentration camps, where many more also died in captivity.

A large Spomenik monument in a park in Podhum now marks the place where Italian forces executed male villagers ranging in age from 16 to 60 years on July 14, 1942. The monument was designed by the Croatian sculptor Šime Vulas (1932–2018).

== History ==
A 22 December 1939 decision as part of agrarian reforms by Ban Šubašić to confiscate the forest property in Podhum and surroundings of the Thurn and Taxis family, Kálmán Ghyczy and Nikola Petrović resulted in a legal dispute known as the Thurn and Taxis Affair, in part because of the relative status of the family and in part because of the proximity to the Italian border.

The morning of 5 November 2017, a fire burned down an old home and threatened to spread to an adjacent one, but the volunteer fire department of Jelenje arrived and put out the fire by around 6:00.

== Bibliography ==
- Prusac, Stjepan (2023-09-26) [defended 2023-09-25]. Posjedi obitelji Thurn Taxis nakon 1918. godine [Thurn Taxis Estates in Croatia after First World War] (Thesis) (in Croatian). Zagreb: Filozofski fakultet Sveučilišta u Zagrebu.
- Banska vlast Banovine Hrvatske (1940b). "Gospodarska prosvjeta i banovinska dobra". Godišnjak banske vlasti Banovine Hrvatske. Vol. 1. pp. 89–96.
