= Temistocle Testa =

Italian Fascist activist and politician

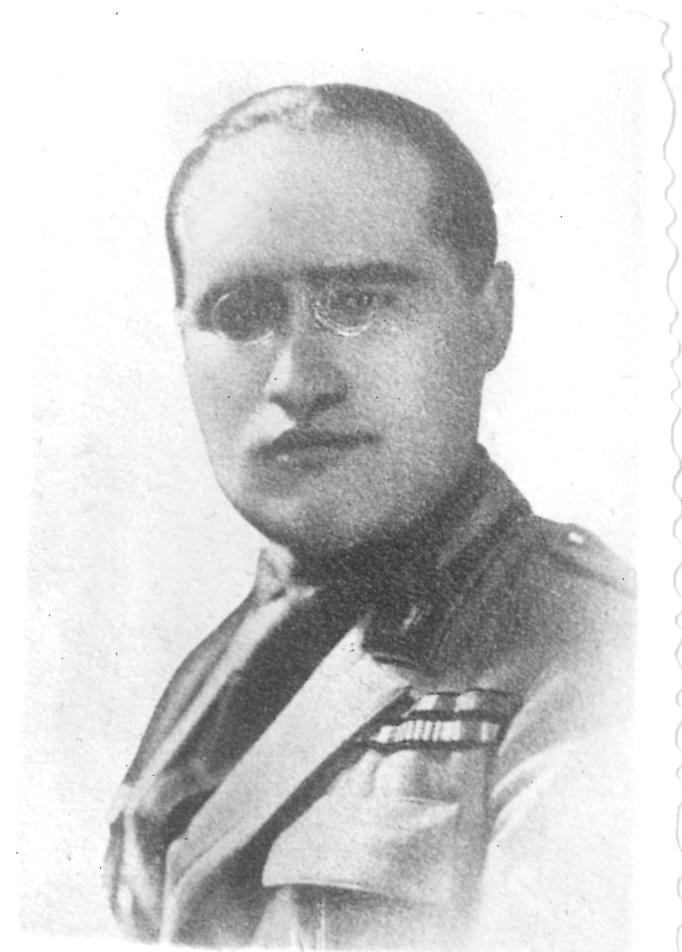
Temistocle Testa

Temistocle Testa (11 November 1897 – 17 July 1949) was an Italian Fascist activist and politician.

Born in Grana, Piedmont on 11 November 1897, Testa studied Law, enrolled in the National Fascist Party (P.N.F.) in February 1921, and participated as squadrista to the March on Rome. As Colonel (Console Comandante) of the Blackshirts from 1923 to 1931 he commanded the 73rd Legione (Mirandola) of the Milizia Volontaria per la Sicurezza Nazionale (M.V.S.N.). As one of the toughest exponents of Fascism in Modena. nominated Segretario Federale of the PNF in Modena (June 1928 – February 1931).

Testa was nominated prefect 2nd class (prefetto di 2ª classe) on 16 February 1931 and prefect of the 1st class (prefetto di 1ª classe) on 1 August 1937. Prefect of Perugia (February 1931 – October 1932). On 16 October 1932 he became prefect of Udine, a post he held up to end February 1938 when he was nominated Prefect of the Province of Fiume. The five years of his rule (1938–1943) overlap with the beginnings of World War II and the Italian attack and Invasion of Yugoslavia. Testa showed extreme aggressiveness in the fight against the Yugoslav Partisans operating in the surroundings of Fiume. For example, on 12 July 1942, he ordered a reprisal in the village of Podhum, in which at least 91 civilians were shot, 200 families deported and all the houses set on fire.

On 24 January 1943 he was sent to Rome, replaced by Agostino Podestà. Testa was initially employed at the Service Directorate for War Intendancy of the Italian ministry of Interior. Soon he was nominated High Commissar for Sicily (Alto Commissario Civile per la Sicilia) a position he held from June 1943 to January 1944.

After the Allied invasion of Sicily, Testa became the Prefect of Rome. There, in the fall of 1943 he had contacts with General Giuseppe Castellano, who negotiated the Armistice of Cassibile on 8 September 1943.

After the fall of Rome, Testa was again employed at the Service Directorate for War Intendancy of the Italian Social Republic Minister of the Interior in Milan with the specific task of controlling all the motorized traffic in northern Italy. Reportedly he was in close contact with Eugen Dollmann, German ambassador to the Holy See and later adjutant of Karl Wolff. Dollmann was also a family friend of Testa.

After World War II, the Provincial Commission of Rome for Assignment to Police Internment (Commissione Provinciale per i provvedimenti di polizia) in June 1947 sentenced Testa for a three years internment. Together with his family he settled in Porretta Terme, where he died in 1949, apparently committing suicide.

== Orders of knighthood ==
- Order of the Crown of Italy
- Order of Saints Maurice and Lazarus
- Colonial Order of the Star of Italy
