= Agostino Podestà =

Italian fascist politician

Agostino Podestà (Novi Ligure, 27 June 1905 – Bolzano, 18 December 1969) was an Italian fascist politician.

Born in Novi Ligure on 27 June 1905, Podestà graduated in Physics, enrolled in the National Fascist Party (P.N.F.) of Italy in November 1920, and participated as squadrista to the March on Rome. He became an Officer of the Blackshirts, and was promoted to Colonel (Console Comandante) in July 1943. He was Secretary of the G.U.F. of Pavia, secretary of the P.N.F. of Novi Ligure, Segretario Federale of the P.N.F. in Avellino and later Verona.

He served as Prefect of Arezzo (1 August 1936 - 20 August 1939) and Prefect of Perugia (1939 - May 1942). In May 1942, he was nominated High Commissar for the Italian-German accords for the South Tyrol (Alto commissariato per l'esecuzione degli accordi italo-tedeschi per l'Alto Adige). He was nominated Prefect of Fiume (1 February 1943 - 20 August 1943).

== Orders of knighthood ==
- Order of the Crown of Italy
- Order of Saints Maurice and Lazarus
- Colonial Order of the Star of Italy
