= Italian Regency of Carnaro =

Unrecognized state in Fiume, Italy (now Rijeka, Croatia) from 1919 to 1920

Italian Regency of Carnaro Reggenza Italiana del Carnaro
- 1919–1920
- Flag Emblem
- Motto: Si spiritus pro nobis, quis contra nos? (Latin for 'If the spirit is with us, who is against us?')
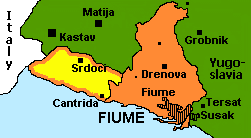
- Map of the "Italian Regency of Carnaro"
- Status: Unrecognized state
- Capital: Fiume
- Common languages: Italian
- Government: Corporatist republic
- Comandante
  - 1919–1920: Gabriele D'Annunzio
- Legislature: Arengo del Carnaro
  - Upper house: Consiglio degli Ottimi
  - Lower house: Consiglio dei Provvisori
- Historical era: Interwar period
  - Coup d'état and establishment: 12 September 1919
  - Modus Vivendi Plebiscite: 18 December 1919
  - Constitution: 8 September 1920
  - Treaty of Rapallo: 12 November 1920
  - Capitulated: 29 December 1920
Preceded by	Succeeded by
Corpus separatum (Fiume)	Free State of Fiume
- Today part of: Croatia

The Italian Regency of Carnaro (Italian: Reggenza Italiana del Carnaro) was a self-proclaimed state in the city of Fiume (now Rijeka, Croatia) led by Gabriele d'Annunzio between 1919 and 1920.

== Impresa di Fiume ==
During World War I (1914–1918), which the Kingdom of Italy entered on the side of the Allies in May 1915, Italy made a pact with the Allies, the Treaty of London, in which it was promised all of the Austrian Littoral, but not the city of Fiume (known in Croatian as Rijeka). Austria-Hungary disintegrated in October 1918 during the final weeks of the war, which ended in the defeat of the Central Powers in November 1918. After the war, at the Paris Peace Conference in 1919, this delineation of territory was confirmed, with Fiume remaining outside of Italy's borders and amalgamated into the Kingdom of the Serbs, Croats and Slovenes (which in 1929 would be renamed the Kingdom of Yugoslavia).

As an Italian nationalist, the poet, playwright, orator, and journalist Gabriele D'Annunzio, who had served as an officer in the Royal Italian Army during World War I, was angered by what he considered to be the surrender of an Italian city. On 12 September 1919, he led a force of 186 so-called "legionaries" from Ronchi in Italy to Fiume. His legionaries were members of the Royal Italian Army's 2nd Grenadiers Regiment's I Battalion. Within days, troops from other army units arrived in Fiume to join D'Annunzio. Soon, he commanded a force of 2,500 troops of former Royal Italian Army, Italian nationalists, and veterans of the Italian front during World War I. They were successful in seizing control of the city and forced the withdrawal of the Allied occupying forces, composed of troops from France, the United Kingdom, and the United States. The march from Ronchi to Fiume became known as the Impresa di Fiume ("Fiume endeavor" or "Fiume enterprise"), and in 1925 Ronchi was renamed Ronchi dei Legionari in honor of it.

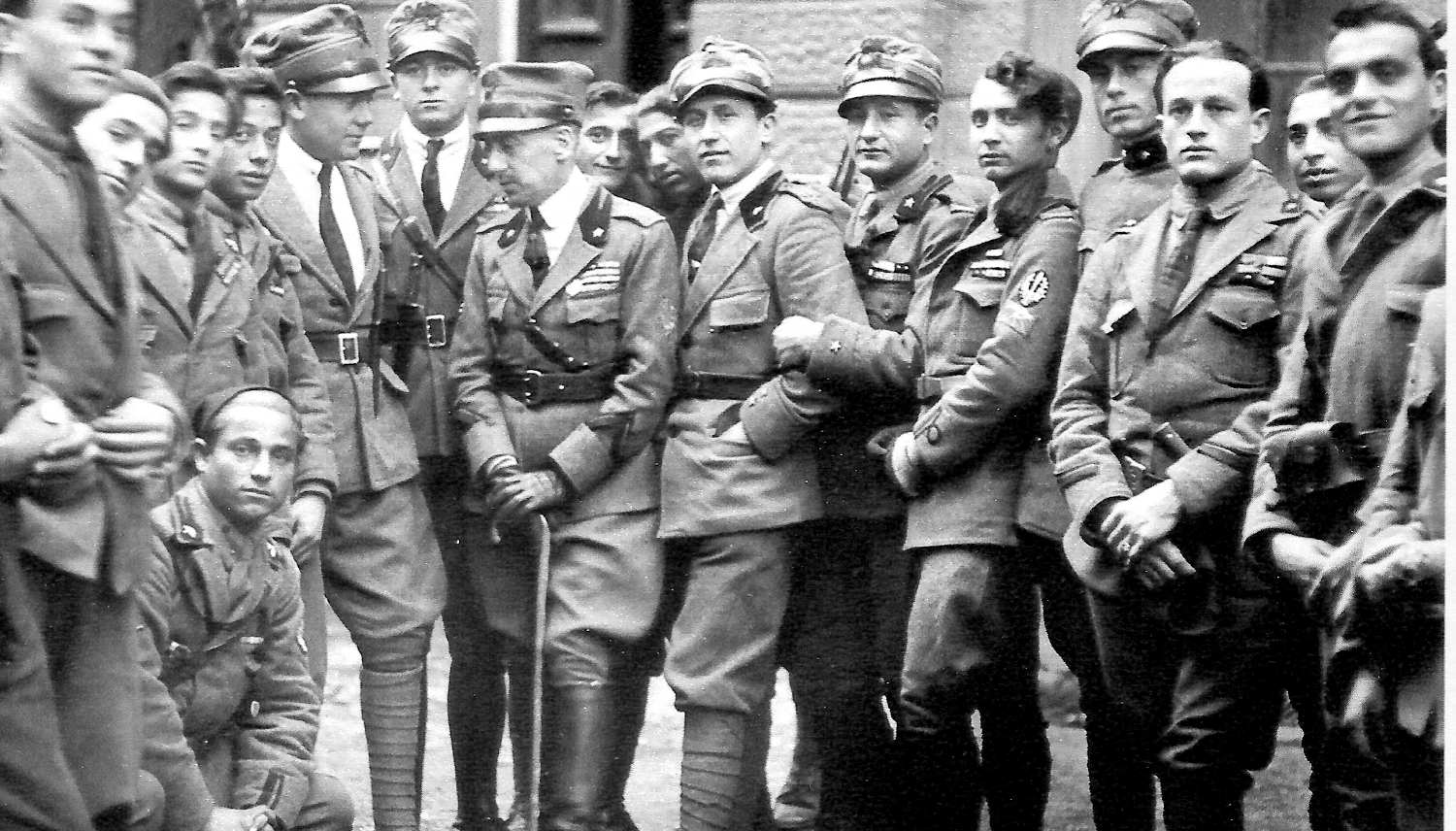
Gabriele d'Annunzio (centre; with the cane) and some "legionaries" – in this case former members of the Arditi (shock troops) corps of the Italian Army, at Fiume in 1919. To the right of D'Annunzio, facing him, is Lieutenant Arturo Avolio (commander of a famed World War I Arditi platoon).

The ethnic Italian portion of the population of Fiume welcomed D'Annunzio enthusiastically, and on the same day, he declared that he had annexed the territory to the Kingdom of Italy. The Italian government opposed this and attempted to pressure D'Annunzio into withdrawing by initiating a blockade of Fiume.

Fiume became a city that attracted artists and radicals from all over Europe. Guido Keller taught yoga to legionaries while Harukichi Shimoi taught karate. Lenin sent D'Annunzio a box of caviar. During his time in Fiume in September 1919, the Italian poet, editor, and art theorist, Filippo Tommaso Marinetti, the founder of the Futurist movement, praised the leaders of the impresa as "advance-guard deserters" (disertori in avanti).

== Modus vivendi ==
On 8 December 1919, the Italian government proposed a modus vivendi recognizing Fiume's desire for annexation and promising they would "only consider acceptable a solution consonant with that which Fiume declared to desire." On 11 and 12 December 1919, D'Annunzio met with General Pietro Badoglio to try to obtain more concessions. Badoglio refused, and D'Annunzio said he would submit the modus vivendi to the Italian National Council of Fiume. The National Council accepted the proposal on 15 December 1919.

After the National Council's decision, D'Annunzio addressed a crowd of 5,000 people and incited them to reject the modus vivendi, promising to put the issue to a plebiscite. The plebiscite was held on 18 December 1919, and despite violence and irregularities the results were overwhelmingly in favour of the modus vivendi. D'Annunzio nullified the results, blaming the violence at the polls for his actions, and announced he would make the final decision himself. He ultimately rejected the modus vivendi. According to historian Michael Ledeen, D'Annunzio made this decision because he distrusted the Italian government and doubted its ability to deliver on its promises.

== Regency ==
Ensign of Carnaro

On 8 September 1920, D'Annunzio proclaimed the city to be under the Italian Regency of Carnaro with a constitution foreshadowing some of the later Italian Fascist system, with himself as dictator, with the title of Comandante.

The name Carnaro was taken from the Golfo del Carnaro (Kvarner Gulf), where the city is located. It was temporarily expanded by D'Annunzio in order to include the island of Veglia.

== Constitution ==
The Charter of Carnaro (Italian: Carta del Carnaro) was a constitution that combined Sorelian national syndicalist, corporativist, and democratic republican ideas. D'Annunzio is often seen as a precursor of the ideals and techniques of Italian fascism. However, D'Annunzio coauthored the charter with syndicalist Alceste De Ambris, who would emerge as a prominent Anti-Fascist and go into exile following Mussolini's seizure of power. De Ambris provided the legal and political framework, to which D'Annunzio added his skills as a poet. The charter designates music a "religious and social institution".

=== Corporations ===
The constitution established a corporatist state, with nine corporations to represent the different sectors of the economy, where membership was mandatory, plus a symbolic tenth corporation devised by D'Annunzio, to represent the "superior individuals" (e.g. poets, "heroes" and "supermen"). The other nine were as follows:

- Industrial and Agricultural Workers
- Seafarers
- Employers
- Industrial and Agricultural Technicians
- Private Bureaucrats and Administrators
- Teachers and Students
- Lawyers and Doctors
- Civil Servants
- Co-operative Workers

=== Executive ===
The executive power would be vested in seven ministers (rettori):

- Foreign Affairs
- Treasury
- Education
- Police and Justice
- Defence
- Public Economy
- Labor

=== Legislature ===
The legislative power was vested in a bicameral legislature. Joint sessions of both councils (Arengo del Carnaro) would be responsible for treaties with foreign powers, amendments to the constitution, and appointment of a dictator in times of emergency (this derived from the institutions of the ancient Roman Republic).

- Council of the Best (Consiglio degli Ottimi): Elected by universal suffrage for a 3-year term, with 1 councilor per 1000 population, this council was responsible for legislation concerning civil and criminal justice, police, armed forces, education, intellectual life and relations between the central government and communes.
- Council of Corporations (Consiglio dei Provvisori): Consisting of 60 members chosen by nine corporations for a 2-year term, this council was responsible for laws regulating business and commerce, labor relations, public services, transportation and merchant shipping, tariffs and trade, public works, medical and legal professions.

=== Judiciary ===
Judicial power was vested in the courts:

- Supreme Court (Corte della Ragione, literally "Court of Reason")
- Communal Courts (Buoni Uomini, literally "Good Men")
- Labour Court (Giudici del Lavoro, "Labour-law Judges")
- Civil Court (Giudici Togati, "Robe-wearing Judges")
- Criminal Court (Giudici del Maleficio, "Judges of wrongdoing")

=== Impact ===
Benito Mussolini was influenced by portions of the constitution, and by D'Annunzio's style of leadership as a whole. D'Annunzio has been described as the "John the Baptist of Italian Fascism," as virtually the entire ritual of Fascism was invented by D'Annunzio during his occupation of Fiume and his leadership of the Italian Regency of Carnaro. These included the balcony address, the Roman salute, the cries of "Eia, eia, eia! Alala!" taken from Achilles's cry in the Iliad, the dramatic and rhetorical dialogue with the crowd, and the use of religious symbols in new secular settings. It also included his method of government in Fiume: the economics of the corporate state; stage tricks; large emotive nationalistic public rituals; and blackshirted followers, the Arditi, with their disciplined, bestial responses and strongarm repression of dissent. He was even said to have originated the practice of forcibly dosing opponents with large amounts of castor oil, a very effective laxative, to humiliate, disable or kill them, a practice which became a common tool of Mussolini's blackshirts.

However, while these links to Fascism became obvious later, they were not so clear at the time itself. While the English and French workers' organizations saw the Fiume enterprise as an imperialist undertaking and called on Italian workers to boycott, the UIL (Unione Italiana del Lavoro), influenced by De Ambris, declared its support for the Fiume enterprise. Other left-wing leaders showed some sympathy for Fiume. Antonio Gramsci, who distrusted D'Annunzio, considered that his movement had appreciable popular elements, and Lenin advised an alliance between Soviet Russia and Carnaro's Italian Regency.

== Demise ==
The approval of the Treaty of Rapallo on 12 November 1920, turned Fiume into an independent state, the Free State of Fiume.

D'Annunzio ignored the Treaty of Rapallo and declared war on Italy itself. On 24 December 1920 the Royal Italian Army, led by General Enrico Caviglia, launched a full-scale attack against Fiume: after several hours of intense fighting, a truce was proclaimed for Christmas Day (25 December 1920); the battle subsequently resumed on 26 December. Since D'Annunzio's legionaries were refusing to surrender and were strongly resisting the attack using machine guns and grenades, the Italian dreadnoughts Andrea Doria and Duilio opened fire on Fiume and bombarded the city for three days. D'Annunzio resigned on 28 December and the Regency capitulated on 30 December 1920. Italian forces occupied it.

The Free State of Fiume lasted officially until 1924, when the Kingdom of Italy formally annexed it under the terms of the Treaty of Rome of 1924. Under the Kingdom of Italy, the administrative division previously represented by the Free State of Fiume became the Province of Fiume.

== See also ==
- Doctrine of Fascism
- List of governors and heads of state of Fiume
- Postage stamps and postal history of Fiume
- Italian irredentism
- Italian nationalism
- Pietro Micheletti
- Unification of Italy
