= Province of Fiume =

Italian province (1924–1947)

Province of Fiume Province of Carnaro Provincia di Fiume (Italian) Provincia del Carnaro (Italian)
- Province of the Kingdom of Italy
- 1924–1947
- Flag Coat of arms

- Location of the province of Fiume in the Kingdom of Italy
- Capital: Fiume
- Area
  - Coordinates: 45°20′N 14°26′E
  - 1938: 1,121.29 km^{2} (432.93 sq mi)
- Population
  - 1938: 109,018
- Government
- Prefect
  - 1924: Gaetano Giardino (first)
  - 1943–1945: Alessandro Spalatin (last)
- Historical era: Interbellum · World War II
  - Established: 22 February 1924
  - Invasion of Yugoslavia: 6–17 April 1941
  - OZAK formed: 10 September 1943
  - Paris Peace Treaty: 10 February 1947
Preceded by	Succeeded by
Free State of Fiume; Kingdom of Yugoslavia	Operational Zone of the Adriatic Littoral; Socialist Federal Republic of Yugoslavia
- Today part of: Croatia; Slovenia

The Province of Fiume (or Province of Carnaro) was a province of the Kingdom of Italy from 1924 to 1943, then under control of the Italian Social Republic and German Wehrmacht from 1943 to 1945 and formally dissolved in 1947. Its capital was the city of Fiume. It took the other name after the Gulf of Carnaro (Italian: Golfo del Carnaro).

The province was divided into thirteen municipalities and in 1938 had an area of 1,121.29 km^{2} (432.93 sq mi), with a population of 109,018 inhabitants and a population density of 109 inhabitants per square kilometre (280/sq mi).

== History ==
The port city of Fiume, part of the Austro-Hungarian Empire until 1918, had been home to a sizeable Italian community, which in the 1911 Austro-Hungarian census amounted to 46.9 % of its population, thus making up the largest ethnic group. Croats were 31.7 % of the inhabitants, Slovenes 7.9 %, Hungarians 7.3 % (Fiume served as the port of Hungary within the dual monarchy), and Germans 5 %. As the surrounding territory was inhabited by a Slavic (Slovene and Croat) majority, and the complete destruction of the Habsburg Empire had not been foreseen at the outbreak of the First World War, Fiume, unlike nearby Istria, had not been requested by the Kingdom of Italy in the 1915 Pact of London; at the end of the war, with the collapse of the Austro-Hungarian Empire, the city was occupied by Italian troops, later joined by detachments from other Entente countries, and was claimed both by Italy and by the newly established Kingdom of the Serbs, Croats and Slovenes (later Kingdom of Yugoslavia).

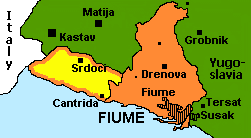
The Free State of Fiume, established in 1920 by the Treaty of Rapallo

In September 1919, amid political turmoil in Italy over the "mutilated victory", Fiume was occupied by mutinous Italian troops led by the nationalist poet Gabriele D'Annunzio, disillusioned with Italy's management of the Fiume question; D'Annunzio established the Regency of Carnaro, which ruled Fiume and its surroundings for over a year until he and his followers were forcibly driven out by regular Italian forces in the Bloody Christmas of 1920. The Fiuman question was then officially solved with the Treaty of Rapallo, which resolved the dispute between Italy and Yugoslavia by awarding the city to neither country, but instead declaring it a free city-state, inhabited by around 50,000 Italian-speakers and 13,000 Croatian-speakers.

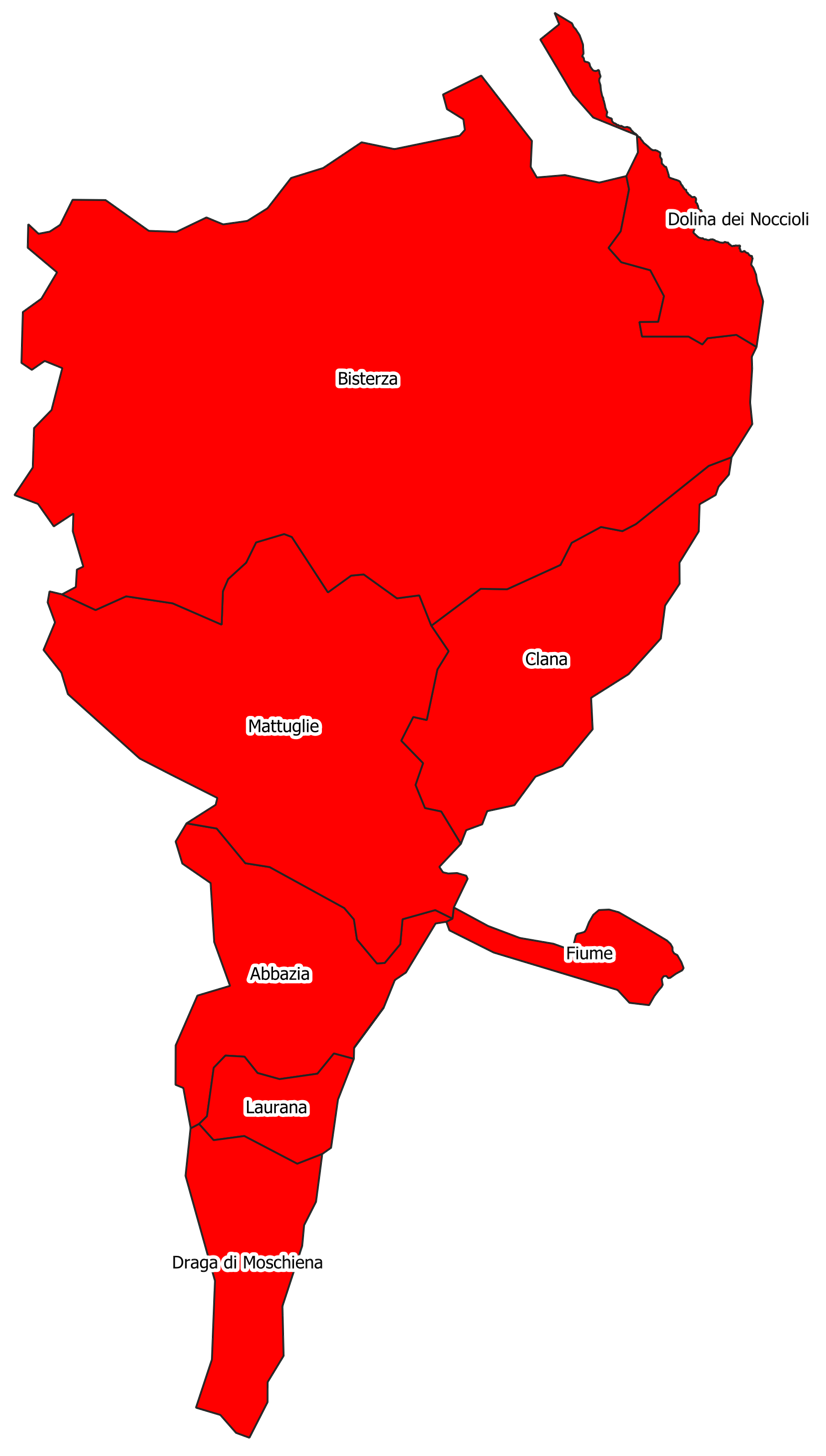
Province of Fiume, 1924

Nationalist and fascists kept on pushing for a direct annexation of Fiume; after a staged coup in 1922, the city was militarily occupied by the Regio Esercito, and in 1924 the Treaty of Rome between Italy and Yugoslavia split the former Free State of Fiume between the two countries, with the city proper being annexated by Italy. Fiume thus became the capital of a new Italian province, established by royal decree no. 213 of 22 February 1924 and including, besides Fiume and coastal part of the former Free State (which became the district (circondario) of Fiume), some towns in northeastern Istria, the district of Volosca-Abbazia, previously part of the province of Pola. In 1928, districts were abolished and two more municipalities passed under the jurisdiction of Fiume, Matteria and Castelnuovo d'Istria.

In 1936, the province thus consisted of thirteen municipalities: Fiume, by far the largest, accounted for nearly half of the province's population, with 53,896 inhabitants; the largest towns besides it were Abbazia (8,642 inhabitants), Mattuglie (8,427), Castelnuovo d'Istria (7,180) and Villa del Nevoso (5,588), whereas the other municipalities (Castel Iablanizza, Clana, Elsane, Fontana del Conte, Laurana, Matteria, Moschiena and Primano) all had fewer than 5,000 inhabitants.

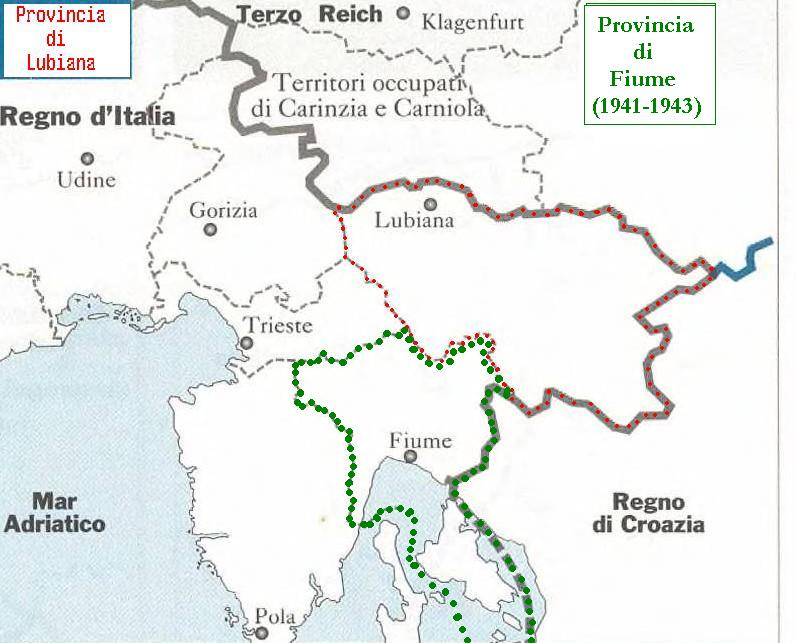
Province of Fiume, April 1941 – September 1943. The isles of Veglia ed Arbe are included.

After the Axis invasion of Yugoslavia in April 1941, the province of Fiume was enlarged by annexating the Fiuman eastern hinterland and the Carnaro isles of Veglia and Arbe. Overall, twenty-four new municipalities became part of the province: Rab (renamed Arbe), Baška (renamed Bescanuova), Crni Lug (renamed Bosconero di Fiume), Bakar (renamed Buccari), Omišalj (renamed Castelmuschio), Kastav (renamed Castua), Jelenje (renamed Cervi), Čabar (renamed Concanera), Dobrinj (renamed Feliciano), Gerovo, Grobnik (renamed Grobnico), Dubašnica (renamed Malinsca-Dobasnizza), Plešće (renamed Plezze), Punat (renamed Ponte), Praputnjak (renamed Praputignacco), Trava (renamed Pratalto), Sušak (renamed Sussa), Draga (renamed Valle di Concanera), Prezid (renamed Vallogiulio), Osilnica (renamed Vallombrosa del Carnaro), Krk (renamed Veglia), Vrbnik (renamed Verbenico), Krasica (renamed Villacarsia), and Čavle (renamed Zaule). Part of the local population started a resistance movement against the Italian occupation of these newly annexed zones, harshly repressed by the Italian military authorities.

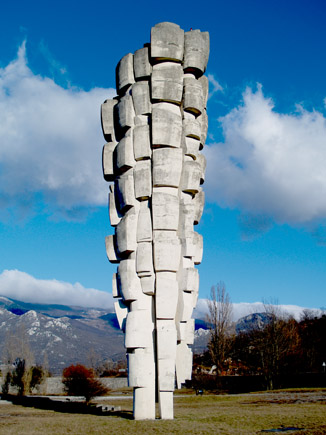
Monument to the victims of the Podhum massacre, carried out by members of the Italian Army on behest of the Prefect of the province of Fiume

Following the signing of the Armistice of Cassibile, on 8 September 1943, the province of Fiume was occupied by German troops during Operation Achse and became part of the Operational Zone of the Adriatic Littoral, although formally part of the Italian Social Republic. During the German occupation, the province of Fiume was the fourth in Italy (after Gorizia, Florence, and Genoa) by death rate from Nazi reprisals and deaths in concentration camps. Amongst those arrested was Giovanni Palatucci, the Italian questore (head of the police) of Fiume, who saved the lives of thousands of Jews. He also created a Committee comprising both Italians and Slavic partisans, as well as Jews, as an attempt to safeguard the independence of Fiume once Germany would have been defeated. He was deported to Dachau and died there in 1945.

Following Palatucci's dismissal, control over the local police was transferred directly to the Gestapo, and Italian sovereignty on the area was seriously limited; in late April 1945, the Yugoslav People's Liberation Army invaded and occupied the province with little to no opposition, claiming it for Yugoslavia. Only in 1947, however, was the Italian province of Fiume formally abolished and its territory ceded to Yugoslavia as a result of the Paris Peace Treaty with Italy.

Nowadays, the former territory of the province of Fiume roughly corresponds to Primorje-Gorski Kotar County in Croatia, except for Ilirska Bistrica (former Villa del Nevoso), Prem (former Primano), Podgrad (former Castelnuovo d'Istria), Jablanica (former Castel Iablanizza), Jelšane (former Elsane), Materija (former Matteria) and Knežak (former Fontana del Conte), which are in Slovenia.

== Geography ==
=== Mountains ===
Name	Height (m)	Place
Monte Nevoso	1,796	Dinaric Alps
Monte Zatreppo	1,454	Dinaric Alps
Monte Maggiore	1,396	Ćićarija
Monte Trestenico	1,243	Dinaric Alps
Alpe Grande	1,271	Ćićarija
Monte Saw	1,234	Ćićarija
Mount Eagle	1,106	Ćićarija
Mount Taiano	1,028	Ćićarija
Monte Sabni	1,024	Ćićarija

=== Rivers ===
- Eneo
- Timavo

== Administrative division ==
=== Settlements and demographics ===
The provincial capital, the city of Fiume, was given to Italy with the Treaty of Rome (27 January 1924), and the formal Italian annexation took place on 16 March 1924. Outside of Fiume proper, Italians were a minority; the 1921 Italian census recorded that 7,895 Italians lived in the Volosca-Abbazia district, opposed to 16,946 Croats and 13,134 Slovenes. Besides the city of Fiume, according to the 1921 census, the only municipality where Italians were the majority was Moschienizze (97.6 %); in Volosca-Abbazia there were 2,297 Italians (45.38 %) as opposed to 1,081 Croats (21.35 %), 343 Slovenes (6.78 %) and 1,341 "foreigners" (26.5 %), and in Laurana Italians were the majority in Laurana proper (74.8 %) but not in the overall municipality (44.8 %), as Croats (50.35 %) were the majority in all other settlements of the municipality. Slovenes were the majority in the municipalities of Castelnuovo d'Istria (73.29 %) and Matteria (73.13 %). In all other municipalities, Croats were the majority, with the Italian minority being usually below 10 % of the total population.

The provincial marking on the vehicle registration plate was initially FU and later FM.

=== Towns and villages ===
- Fiume (Rijeka): Borgomarina, Cosala (Kozala), Drenova (Drenova), Plasse (Plase).
- Abbazia (Opatija): Apriano (Veprinac), Crissizza (Križevice), Lipovizza (Lipovica), Pogliane (Poljane), Preluca (Preluka), Scherbici (Škrbići), Slatina (Slatina), Vassania (Vašanska), Volosca (Volosko ).
- Draga di Moschiena (Mošćenička Draga): Bersezio (Brseč), Cala (Kalac), Obers (Obrš), Riva Mošćenička (Krai), Ruins (Ruins), San Pietro (St. Peter), St. Antonio (St. Anton), Selza (Flint ), Trebisca (Trebišća), Monte Maggiore (Učka), Valsantamarina (Moscenicka Draga).
- Laurana (Lovran): Bacova, Cali, Cosuli, Dobrecchi, Draga Laurana, Giagnetici, Ica, Monte, Oprino, Carnaro of Saint Francis, Saint-Roch Ligani, Smarici, Tuliano, Visozze, Ucovazzi.
- Primano (Prem): Berdo San Giovanni, Bittigne di Sopra, Bittigne di Sotto, Ceglie, Mt Chilovi, Ratečevo in Monte Sméria.
- Matteria (Materija): Artuise, Bresovizza Marenzi, Bresovoberdo, Calcizza, Cosiane, Coticcina, Gelovizza, Golazzo, Gradiscizza, Loccegrande, Marcossina, Mersane, Orecca, Ostrovizza, Pusane, Rosizze, Scandaussina, Slivia of Castelnuovo, Tow, Tatre, Tublie, Vodice Castelnuovo .
- Castel Iablanizza (Jablanica): Cottésevo, Iasena of Bisterza, Terciane, Verbizza, Verbovo, Villa Podigraie, Zabice Castelvecchio di Sopra Zemon, Zemon di Sotto.
- Villa del Nevoso (Ilirska Bistrica):Torrenova Bucovizza Large, Small Bucovizza, Caries, Cossese, Merecce, Poglie, Postegna, Postegnesca, Sarecce, Sarecizza Val Timavo, Sose, Tomigna, Topolza, Bisterza of Torrenova .
- Knežak: Baccia of Bisterza, Coritenza of Bisterza, Drescozze, Sagòria San Martin, San Giorgio, Sémbie, Taborgrande, Tabor Sémbie.
- Jelšane: Berdo of Elsane, Berze, Cracinanova, Dolegne of Elsane, Fabice, Lippa of Elsane, Passiaco, Ruppa, Sappiane, Sussa, Villanova.
- Mattuglie (Matulji): Bergut Large, Small Bergut, Biscopi, Bresa, Corsenico, Criva, Cuceli, Cusnici, Ferlania, Francici, Gai, Gerzancici, Ghersetici, Gerzici, Giordani, Giussici Border, Michelici, fungal, Monte, Mussici, Pereni, Pobri, Possici, Pucari, Pussevi, Pusi, Ruccavazzo High, Low Ruccavazzo, Russici, Serapena, Snidari, Suonecchia, Suseni, Tertini, Varlieni, Vissici.
- Castelnuovo (Podgrad): Crussizza of Castelnuovo, Eriacci, Gabrega, Giavorie, Gradischie of Cast, Mune Large, Small Mune, Obrovo Santa Maria, Paulizza, Pobese, Pogliane, Pregara, Prelose Sant'Egidio, Racizze, Rittomece, Sabogna, Seiane, Starada, Studena in Monte Zaielse.
- Clana (Klana): Isera, San Rocco, Scalnizza, Studena, Zidovje.

=== Districts ===
- Bisterza, divided into Bisterza and Torrenova of Bisterza.
- Fiume, divided into the wards of Abbazia and Fiume.

== Infrastructure ==
=== Roads ===
The province was covered by the following highways:

- State Road 14 in Venezia Giulia
- The highway of Bisterza 59 (SS 59)
- The highway 60, Monte Maggiore (SS 60)
- Highway 61 on liburnica

=== Railway ===
- St Peters Krasu-Rijeka railway.
- Zagreb-Rijeka railway/

=== Ports ===
- Port of Fiume

== Languages ==
The people spoke different languages and dialects, amongst which include:

- Italian, the official language
- Venetian, spoken on the coast
- Slovene, in the dialect spoken in north inner Istria
- Croatian, in the Chakavian dialect spoken in Eastern Istria

== Religion ==
Almost the entire population professed Catholicism and looked towards the Roman Catholic Archdiocese of Fiume a suffragan of the time, or the Roman Catholic Archdiocese of Gorizia, of the Ecclesiastical Region of Triveneto.

== See also ==
- Italian Regency of Carnaro
- Charter of Carnaro
- Free State of Fiume
- List of governors and heads of state of Fiume
- TIGR
- Free Territory of Trieste
- Italianization
- Roman Catholic Archdiocese of Gorizia

== Bibliography ==
- Rodogno, David. Mediterranean, the new order. Ed Basic Books. Turin, 2003.
