= Treaty of Rome (1924) =

Territorial settlement between Italy and Yugoslavia

- Type: Bilateral treaty
- Signed: 27 January 1924
- Location: Rome, Italy
- Original signatories: Italy; Kingdom of Serbs, Croats and Slovenes

The Treaty of Rome was agreed on 27 January 1924, when Italy and the Kingdom of Serbs, Croats and Slovenes agreed that Fiume would be annexed to Italy as the Province of Fiume, and the town of Sušak would be part of the Kingdom of Serbs, Croats and Slovenes.

Fiume and Sušak would have a joint administration of the port facilities. Both towns are now in the city of Rijeka, Croatia.

== Background ==
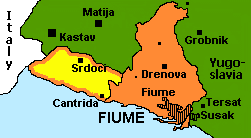
Fiume County (orange), as well as the strip of land (yellow), became the Free State of Fiume by the Treaty of Rapallo.

After Fiume was under Gabriele D'Annunzio's Italian Regency of Carnaro, the Treaty of Rapallo (1920) created the independent Free State of Fiume, which was immediately recognised by other states, including the United States, France and the United Kingdom. The state survived only one year de facto and four years de jure. The joint administration of the port was never created.

On 24 April 1921, the first general elections for its parliament occurred, and it elected President Riccardo Zanella, the leader of the Autonomist Fiuman Movement. On 3 March 1922, a movement directed by the fascist deputy Francesco Giunta forced Zanella to resign. On 17 September 1923, Gaetano Giardino, an Italian general, was sent by Italian Prime Minister Benito Mussolini with the task of restoring public order. In the meantime, negotiations started between Italy and the Kingdom of Serbs, Croats and Slovenes to dissolve the Free State of Fiume.

All parties ratified the agreement in Rome on 22 February 1924, and it became effective the same day. It was registered in the League of Nations Treaty Series on 7 April 1924.

== Terms ==
The Treaty of Rome revoked parts of the Treaty of Rapallo. The Kingdom of Serbs, Croats and Slovenes asserted its sovereignty over the delta of the Rječina River, including the seaport of Sušak (Porto Barros) and the north of Fiume County. Italy was given the city of Fiume, some surrounding land and a coastal corridor to connect it to the Italian mainland.

== Aftermath ==
The exact definition of the borders were the object of a joint commission, whose results were agreed upon on 20 July 1925 in the Treaty of Nettuno.

In 1941, during the Second World War, a larger area around the city was annexed by Italy and added to the Province of Fiume following the Axis invasion of Yugoslavia. The province then came under German occupation in 1943 as part of the Operational Zone of the Adriatic Littoral. Following the upheaval of the Second World War, Tito's Yugoslavia annexed Fiume, putting an end to the provisions of the Treaty of Rome.

Nowadays, its former territory lies within Primorje-Gorski Kotar County in Croatia.
