= Rijeka (disambiguation) =

Rijeka is a city in Croatia.

Rijeka may also refer to:

- HNK Rijeka, a football club from Rijeka
- 11706 Rijeka, a minor planet
- Rijeka, Olovo, a village in Bosnia and Herzegovina
- Rijeka (Trnovo), a village in Bosnia and Herzegovina
- Rijeka (Višegrad), a village in Bosnia and Herzegovina
- Rijeka, Vitez, a village in Bosnia and Herzegovina
- Rijeka Crnojevića, a place in Montenegro

== See also ==
- Fiume (disambiguation)
- Kriva Rijeka (disambiguation)
