= Oscarre Vicich =

Italian footballer

Personal information
- Date of birth: 26 June 1922
- Place of birth: Rijeka, Free State of Fiume (present-day Rijeka, Croatia)
- Date of death: 17 February 1994 (aged 71)
- Position: Defender

Senior career*
Years	Team	Apps	(Gls)
1942–1943	Magazzini Generali Fiume		
1945–1946	Kvarner Rijeka		
1946–1947	Juventus	23	(1)
1947–1949	Sampdoria	26	(0)
1949–1953	Udinese	97	(0)
- * Club domestic league appearances and goals

Oscarre Vicich, first name also spelled Oscar (26 June 1922, Rijeka, Free State of Fiume - 17 February 1994) was an Italian professional football player.
