= Kriva Reka =

Kriva Reka or Kriva Rijeka (Serbo-Croatian for "Curved River"), or Kriva River may refer to:

== Places ==
- Kriva Reka (Brus), a village in the municipality of Brus, Serbia
- Kriva Reka (Gornji Milanovac), a village in the municipality of Gornji Milanovac, Serbia
- Kriva Reka (Čajetina), a village in the municipality of Čajetina, Serbia
- Kriva Rijeka (Kozarska Dubica), a village in the municipality of Kozarska Dubica, Republika Srpska, Bosnia and Herzegovina

== Rivers ==
- Kriva River (Strigova), a river in Bosnia and Herzegovina; a tributary of the Strigova
- Kriva River (Pčinja), a river in North Macedonia; a tributary of the Pčinja

== See also ==
- Krivá, a village and municipality in Dolný Kubín District, Slovakia
- Krivaja (Bosna), a river in Bosnia and Herzegovina; a tributary of the Bosna River
- Reka (disambiguation)
