= History of Rijeka =

History of Croatian city

Timeline of Rijeka
Historical affiliations

Kingdom of Croatia pre-1102. Kingdom of Croatia-Kingdom of Hungary:1102–1466
Holy Roman Empire (Habsburg monarchy), 1466–1809
First French Empire, 1809–1814
Austrian Empire, 1814–1867
Austria-Hungary ( Transleithania), 1867–1918
Italian Regency of Carnaro, 1919–1920
Free State of Fiume, 1920–1924
Kingdom of Italy, 1924–1943
OZAK, 1943–1945
Yugoslavia (SR Croatia), 1945–1991
Croatia, 1991–present

Rijeka, formerly known as Fiume, is a city located in the northern tip of the Kvarner Gulf in the northern Adriatic. It is currently the third-largest city in Croatia. It was part of the Roman province of Dalmatia, and later of the Kingdom of Croatia. It grew during the 12th to 14th centuries as a seaport within the Holy Roman Empire, trading with Italian cities. Under the rule of the House of Habsburg from 1466, it was made a free city; and, although part of the Duchy of Carniola, it developed local self-government.

During the 16th and 17th centuries, Rijeka came under attack from both Turkish and Venetian forces, and became a base for irregular Habsburg troops known as Uskoks. Its maritime trade was suppressed by Venice until the late 17th century, when peace was concluded, and the Habsburgs set about developing the city as a major port, with sugar refineries and other industries being introduced. Rijeka was attached to the Kingdom of Hungary in 1779, retaining its autonomous status, although the Kingdom of Croatia also maintained a claim.

Between 1809 and 1813, Rijeka was occupied by Napoleonic France as part of the Illyrian Provinces. After the reconquest by Austria, it was placed within the Kingdom of Illyria until 1822 and then restored to Hungary. Industrial development recommenced, the port was modernized, a naval base established, and railways connecting the city with Hungary and Serbia were constructed. Under the Austro-Hungarian Compromise of 1867, Hungary gained equal status with Austria; and Rijeka, as Hungary's main port, became a rival to Austria's port of Trieste. Under the leadership of Giovanni de Ciotta the city was extensively rebuilt during the late 19th century. As the result of further industrial expansion and immigration, Italians became the largest single group in the city.

Upon the defeat and dissolution of the Austro-Hungarian monarchy in 1918, Italy and the new Kingdom of the Serbs, Croats and Slovenes (later the Kingdom of Yugoslavia) both laid claim to Rijeka. Negotiations in 1919 at the Paris Peace Conference were pre-empted by a coup, led by Gabriele D'Annunzio, that established the Italian Regency of Carnaro, which was based in the city. The coup was suppressed by Italian troops the next year, and under the Treaty of Rapallo the independent Free State of Fiume was established. However, in 1924, after Benito Mussolini became ruler in Italy, Rijeka (as Fiume) was annexed to Italy.

Rijeka was occupied by German troops in 1943, after Italy came to terms with the Allies of World War II; and it experienced extensive damage from Allied bombing. After fierce fighting, it was captured on 3 May 1945 by Yugoslav forces and was later annexed to the Socialist Republic of Croatia under the Paris peace treaty of 1947. Most of the Italian population fled, and were subsequently replaced by immigrants from other parts of Yugoslavia. Rijeka became the largest port in Yugoslavia, and economic growth sectors included port traffic, oil, and coal. On the breakup of Yugoslavia in 1991, Rijeka became part of independent Croatia, but has experienced economic difficulties, with the closure of many of its older industries.

== Name ==
Historically, Rijeka was called Tharsatica, Vitopolis (lit. 'City of [Saint] Vitus'), or Flumen (lit. 'River') in Latin. The city is called Rijeka in Croatian, Reka in Slovene, and Reka or Rika in the local dialects of the Chakavian language. It is called Fiume in Italian and in Fiuman Venetian. All these names mean 'river' in their respective languages. Meanwhile, in German the city has been called Sankt Veit am Flaum/Pflaum (lit. 'St. Vitus on the Flaum/Pflaum', with the name of the river being derived from Latin flumen).

== Ancient times ==
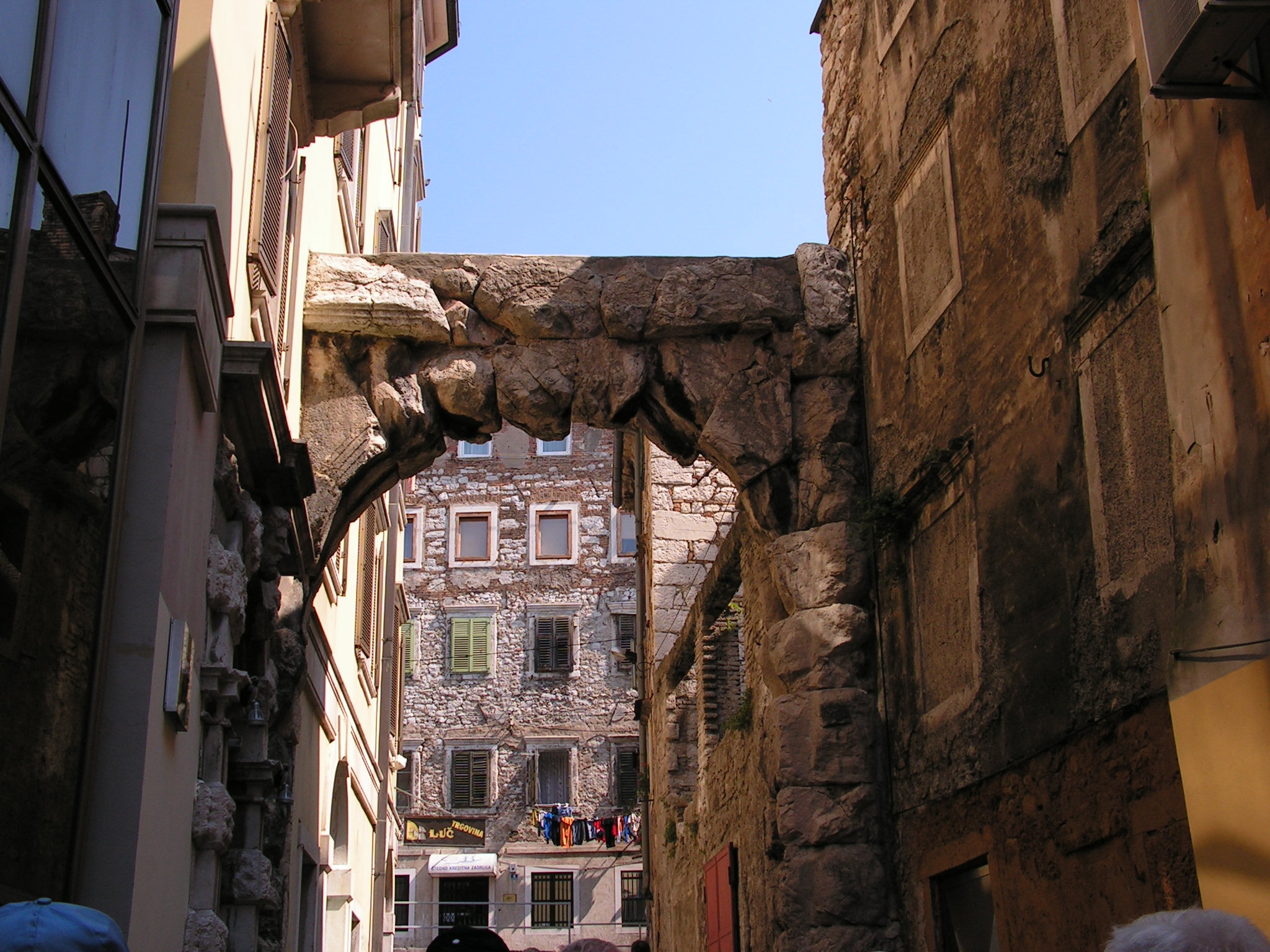
The Roman arch (Rimski luk), the oldest architectural monument in Rijeka and an entrance to the old town

After the Romans defeated the native Illyrians and conquered this part of the Adriatic coast 180 b.c.

Though traces of Neolithic settlements can be found in the region, the earliest modern settlements on the site were Celtic Tharsatica (modern Trsat, now part of Rijeka) on the hill, and the tribe of mariners, the Liburni, in the natural harbour below. The city long retained its dual character. Rijeka was first mentioned in the 1st century AD by Pliny the Elder as Tarsatica in his Natural History (iii.140). Rijeka (Tarsatica) is again mentioned around AD 150 by the Greek geographer and astronomer Ptolemy in his Geography when describing the "Location of Illyria or Liburnia, and of Dalmatia" (Fifth Map of Europe). In the time of Augustus, the Romans rebuilt Tarsatica as a municipium Flumen (MacMullen 2000), situated on the right bank of the small river Rječina (whose name means "the big river"). It became a city within the Roman Province of Dalmatia until the 6th century. In this period the city is part of the Liburnia limes (system of walls and fortifications against raiding Barbarians). Remains of these walls are still visible in some places today.

he region which ran along the coast of the Adriatic Sea and extended inland on the Dinaric Alps was called Illyria by the Greeks. Originally, the Romans also called the area Illyria and later, Illyricum. The Romans fought three Illyrian Wars (229 BC, 219/8 BC and 168 BC) mainly against the kingdom of the Ardiaei to the south of the region. In 168 BC, they abolished this kingdom and divided it into three republics. The area became a Roman protectorate. The central and northern area of the region engaged in piracy and raided north-eastern Italy. In response, Octavian (who later became the emperor Augustus) conducted a series of campaigns in Illyricum (35–33 BC). The area became the Roman senatorial province of Illyricum probably in 27 BC. Due to troubles in the northern part of the region in 16–10 BC, it became an imperial province. The administrative organisation of Illyricum was carried out late in the reign of Augustus (27 BC – 14 AD) and early in the reign of Tiberius (14–37 AD).

Due to Octavian having subdued the more inland region of Pannonia (along the mid-course of the River Danube), the Romans changed the name of the coastal area to Dalmatia. In 6–9 AD, there was a large scale rebellion in the province of Illyricum, the Bellum Batonianum (Batonian War). Velleius Paterculus describes Gaius Vibius Postumus as the military commander of Dalmatia under Germanicus in 9 AD; this is the earliest extant writing which indicates that the province of Illyricum comprised Dalmatia and Pannonia.

The province of Illyricum was eventually dissolved and replaced by two smaller provinces: Dalmatia (the southern area) and Pannonia (the northern and Danubian area). It is unclear when this happened. Kovác noted that an inscription on the base of a statue of Nero erected between 54 and 68 AD attests that it was erected by the veteran of a legion stationed in Pannonia and argues that this is the first epigraphic evidence that a separate Pannonia existed at least since the reign of Nero. However, Šašel-Kos notes that an inscription attests a governor of Illyricum under the reign of Claudius (41–54 AD) and in a military diploma published in the late 1990s, dated July 61 AD, units of auxiliaries from the Pannonian part of the province were mentioned as being stationed in Illyricum. Some other diplomas attest the same. This was during the reign of Nero (54–68 AD). Therefore, Šašel-Kos supports the notion that the province was dissolved during the reign of Vespasian (69–79 AD).

After the 4th century Rijeka was rededicated to St. Vitus, the city's patron saint, as Terra Fluminis sancti Sancti Viti or in German Sankt Veit am Pflaum. From the 5th century onwards, the town was ruled successively by the Ostrogoths, the Byzantines, the Lombards, and the Avars. The city was burned down in 452 by the troops of Attila the Hun as part of their Aquileia campaign. Croats settled the city starting in the 7th century giving it the Croatian name, Rika svetoga Vida ("the river of Saint Vitus"). At the time, Rijeka was a feudal stronghold surrounded by a wall. At the center of the city, its highest point, was a fortress.

== Medieval times ==
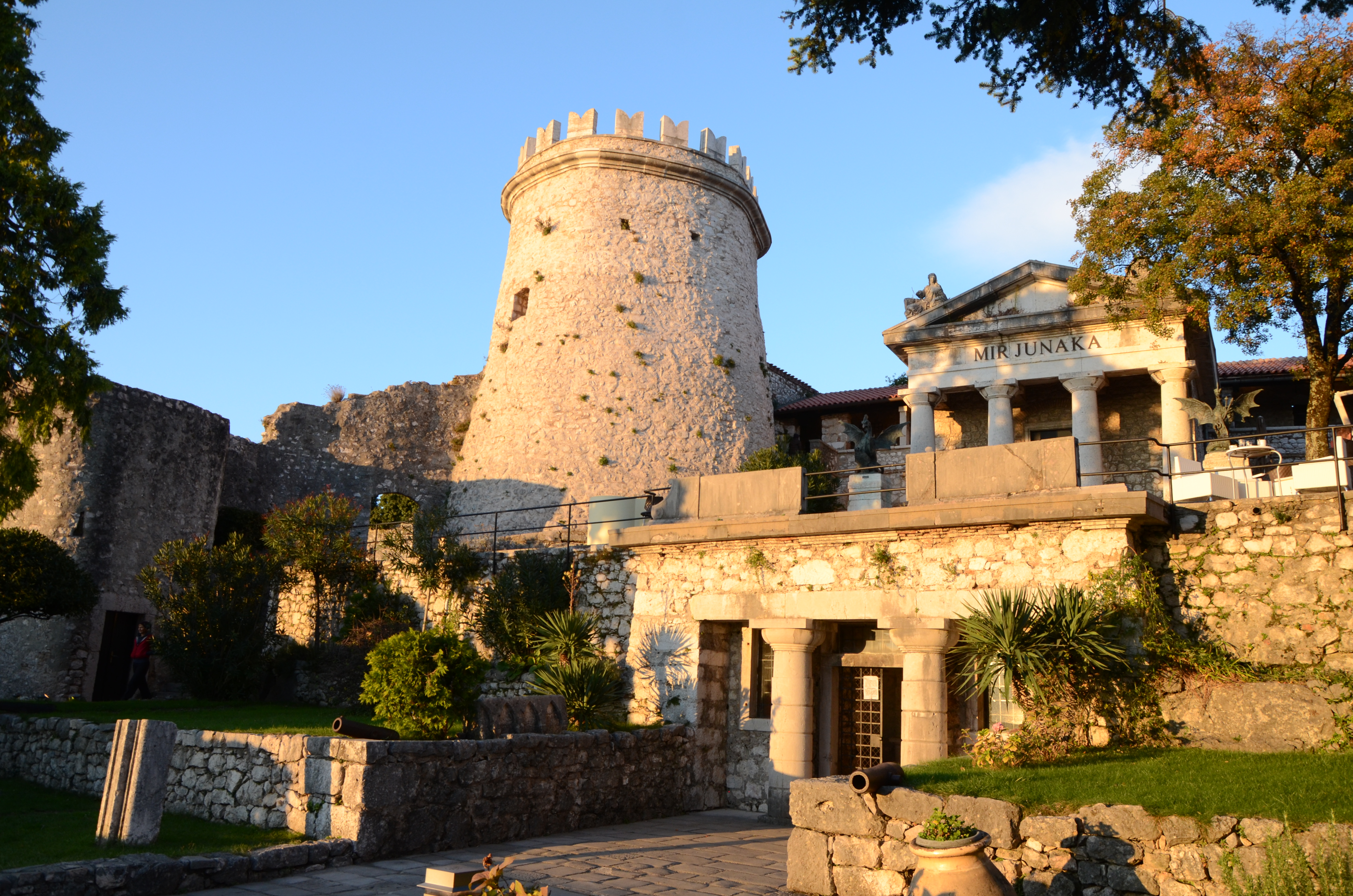
Trsat Castle lies at the exact spot of an ancient Illyrian and Roman fortress.

In 799 Rijeka was attacked by the Frankish troops of Charlemagne. Their Siege of Trsat was at first repulsed, during which the Frankish commander Duke Eric of Friuli was killed. However, the Frankish forces finally occupied and devastated the castle, while the Duchy of Croatia passed under the overlordship of the Carolingian Empire. From about 925, the town was part of the Kingdom of Croatia, from 1102 in personal union with Hungary. Trsat Castle and the town was rebuilt under the rule of the House of Frankopan.

The Croatian Kingdom was ruled for part of its existence by ethnic dynasties, and the Kingdom existed as a sovereign state for nearly two centuries. Its existence was characterized by various conflicts and periods of peace or alliance with the Bulgarians, Byzantines, Hungarians, and competition with Venice for control over the eastern Adriatic coast. The goal of promoting the Croatian language in the religious service was initially introduced by the 10th century bishop Gregory of Nin, which resulted in a conflict with the Pope, later to be put down by him. In the second half of the 11th century Croatia managed to secure most coastal cities of Dalmatia with the collapse of Byzantine control over them. During this time the kingdom reached its peak under the rule of kings Peter Krešimir IV (1058–1074) and Demetrius Zvonimir (1075–1089).

The state was ruled mostly by the Trpimirović dynasty until 1091. At that point the realm experienced a succession crisis and after a decade of conflicts for the throne and the aftermath of the Battle of Gvozd Mountain, the crown passed to the Árpád dynasty with the coronation of King Coloman of Hungary as "King of Croatia and Dalmatia" in Biograd in 1102, uniting the two kingdoms under one crown.

The 'Kingdom of Croatia entered a personal union with the Kingdom of Hungary in 1102, after a period of rule of kings from the Trpimirović and Svetoslavić dynasties and a succession crisis following the death of king Demetrius Zvonimir. With the coronation of King Coloman of Hungary as "King of Croatia and Dalmatia" in 1102 in Biograd, the realm passed to the Árpád dynasty until 1301, when the (male) line of the dynasty died out. Then, kings from the Capetian House of Anjou, who were also cognatic descendants of the Árpád kings, ruled the kingdoms. Later centuries were characterized by conflicts with the Mongols, who sacked Zagreb in 1242, competition with Venice for control over Dalmatian coastal cities, and internal warfare among Croatian nobility. Various individuals emerged during the period, such as Paul I Šubić of Bribir, who was representing the most powerful Croatian dynasty at the time, the Šubić noble family. These powerful individuals were on occasion able to de facto secure great deal of independence for their fiefdoms. The Ottoman incursion into Europe in the 16th century significantly reduced Croatian territories and left the country weak and divided. After the death of Louis II in 1526 during the Battle of Mohács and a brief period of dynastic dispute, both crowns passed to the Austrian House of Habsburg, and the realms became part of the Habsburg monarchy. Some of the terms of Coloman's coronation and the later status of the Croatian nobles are detailed in the Pacta Conventa, a document preserved only in transcript from the 14th century. The precise terms of this relationship became a matter of dispute in the 19th century; nonetheless, even in dynastic union with Hungary, institutions of separate Croatian statehood were maintained through the Sabor (an assembly of Croatian nobles) and the Ban (viceroy). In addition, the Croatian nobles retained their lands and titles.

The precise terms of the relationship between the two realms became a matter of dispute in the 19th century. The nature of the relationship varied through time, with Croatia retaining a large degree of internal autonomy overall, while the real power rested in the hands of the local nobility. Modern Croatian and Hungarian historiographies mostly view the relations between the Kingdom of Croatia and the Kingdom of Hungary from 1102 as a form of unequal personal union of two internally autonomous kingdoms united by a common Hungarian king.

In 1288 the Rijeka citizens signed the Law codex of Vinodol, one of the oldest codes of law in Europe. Law code of Vinodol or Vinodol statute (Croatian: Vinodolski zakonik) is one of the oldest law texts written in the Chakavian dialect of Croatian and is among the oldest Slavic codes. (Note: Russkaya Pravda is the only older code in Slavdom.) It was written in the Glagolitic alphabet. It was originally compiled in 1288 by a commission of 42 members in Novi Vinodolski, a town on the Adriatic Sea coast in Croatia, located south of Crikvenica, Selce and Bribir and north of Senj. However, the code itself is preserved in a 16th-century copy.

In the period from about 1300 to 1466 Rijeka was ruled by a number of noble families, the most prominent of which was the German Walsee family. Rijeka even rivalled Venice when in it was sold by Vitus Butinarius to the Habsburg emperor Frederick III, Archduke of Austria in 1466. It would remain under Austrian Habsburg rule for over 450 years (except for a brief period of French rule between 1809 and 1813) until the end of World War I in 1918 when it was occupied by Croatian and subsequently by Italian irregulars.

== Under Habsburg rule ==
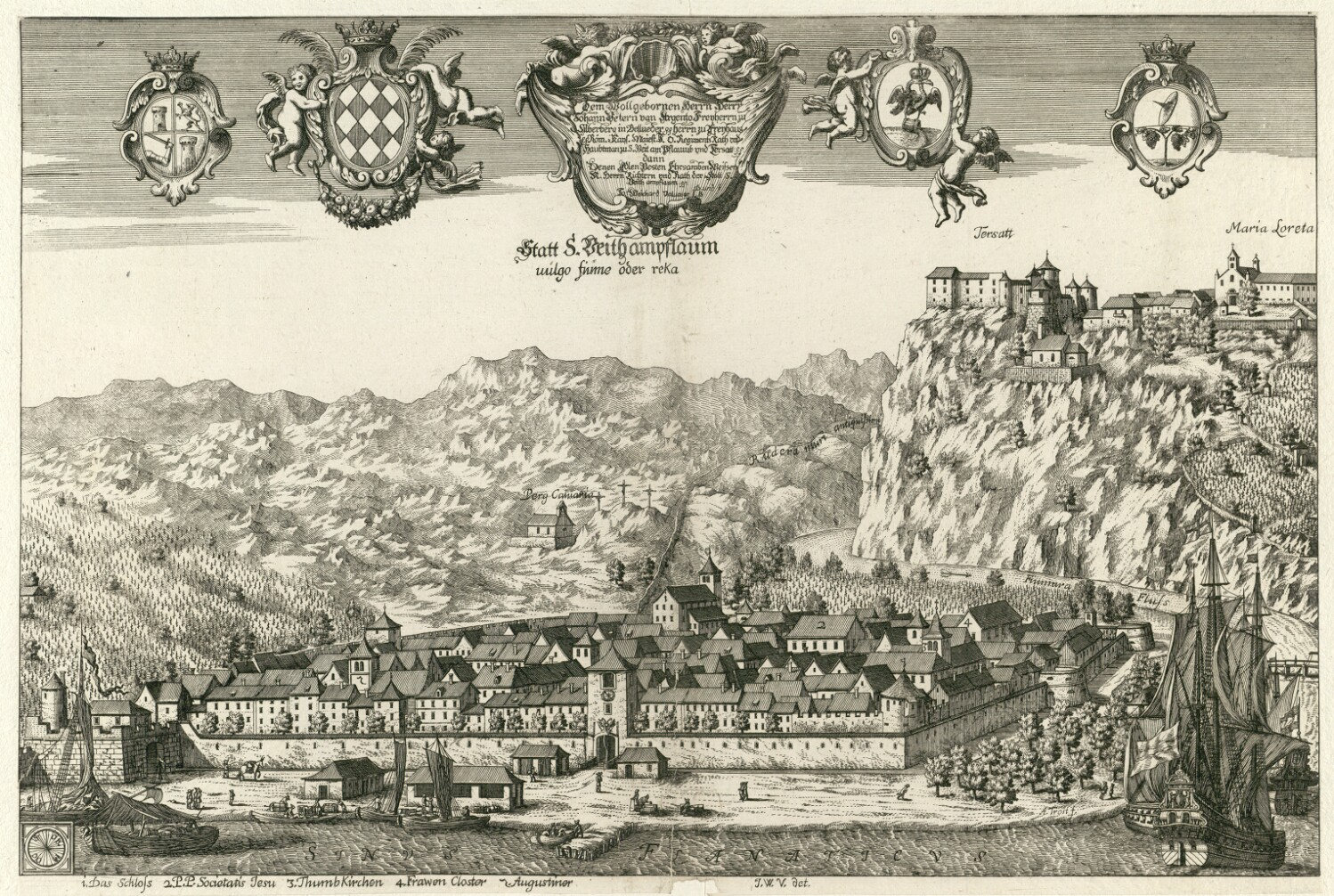
Rijeka and Trsat

Austrian presence on the Adriatic Sea was seen as a threat by the Republic of Venice and during the War of the League of Cambrai the Venetians raided and devastated the city with great loss of life in 1508 and again in 1509. The city did however recover and remain under Austrian rule. For its fierce resistance to the Venetians it received the title of the "most loyal city" ("fidelissimum oppidium") as well as commercial privileges from the Austrian emperor Maximilian I in 1515. While Ottoman forces attacked the town several times, they never occupied it. From the 16th century onwards, Rijeka's present Renaissance and Baroque style started to take shape. Emperor Charles VI declared the Port of Rijeka a free port (together with the Port of Trieste) in 1719 and had the trade route to Vienna expanded in 1725.

On November 28, 1750 Rijeka was hit by a large earthquake. The devastation was so widespread that the city had to be almost completely rebuilt. In 1753, the Austrian Empress Maria Theresa approved the funding for rebuilding Rijeka as a "new city" ("Civitas nova"). The rebuilt Rijeka was significantly different - it was transformed from a small medieval walled town into a larger commercial and maritime city centered around its port.

By order of Maria Theresa in 1779, the city was annexed to the Kingdom of Hungary and governed as corpus separatum directly from Budapest by an appointed governor, as Hungary's only international port. From 1804, Rijeka was part of the Austrian Empire (Kingdom of Croatia-Slavonia after the Compromise of 1867), in the Croatia-Slavonia province.

During the Napoleonic Wars, Rijeka was briefly captured by the French Empire and included in the Illyrian Provinces. During the French rule, between 1809 and 1813, the critically important Louisiana road was completed (named after Napoleon's wife Marie Louise). The road was the shortest route from Rijeka to the interior (Karlovac) and gave a strong impulse to the development of Rijeka's port. In 1813 the French rule came to an end when Rijeka was first bombarded by the Royal Navy and later re-captured by the Austrians under the command of the Irish general Laval Nugent von Westmeath. The British bombardment has an interesting side story. The city was apparently saved from annihilation by a young lady named Karolina Belinić who - amid the chaos and destruction of the bombardment - went to the English fleet commander and convinced him that further bombardment of the city was unnecessary (the small French garrison was quickly defeated and left the city). The legend of Karolina is warmly remembered by the population even today. She became a folk hero Karolina Riječka (Caroline of Rijeka) and has been celebrated in plays, movies and even in a rock opera.

In the early 19th century, the most prominent economical and cultural leader of the city was Andrija Ljudevit Adamić. Fiume also had a significant naval base, and in the mid-19th century it became the site of the Imperial and Royal Naval Academy (German: K.u.K. Marine-Akademie), where the Austro-Hungarian Navy trained its officers.

== Hungarian Crown ==
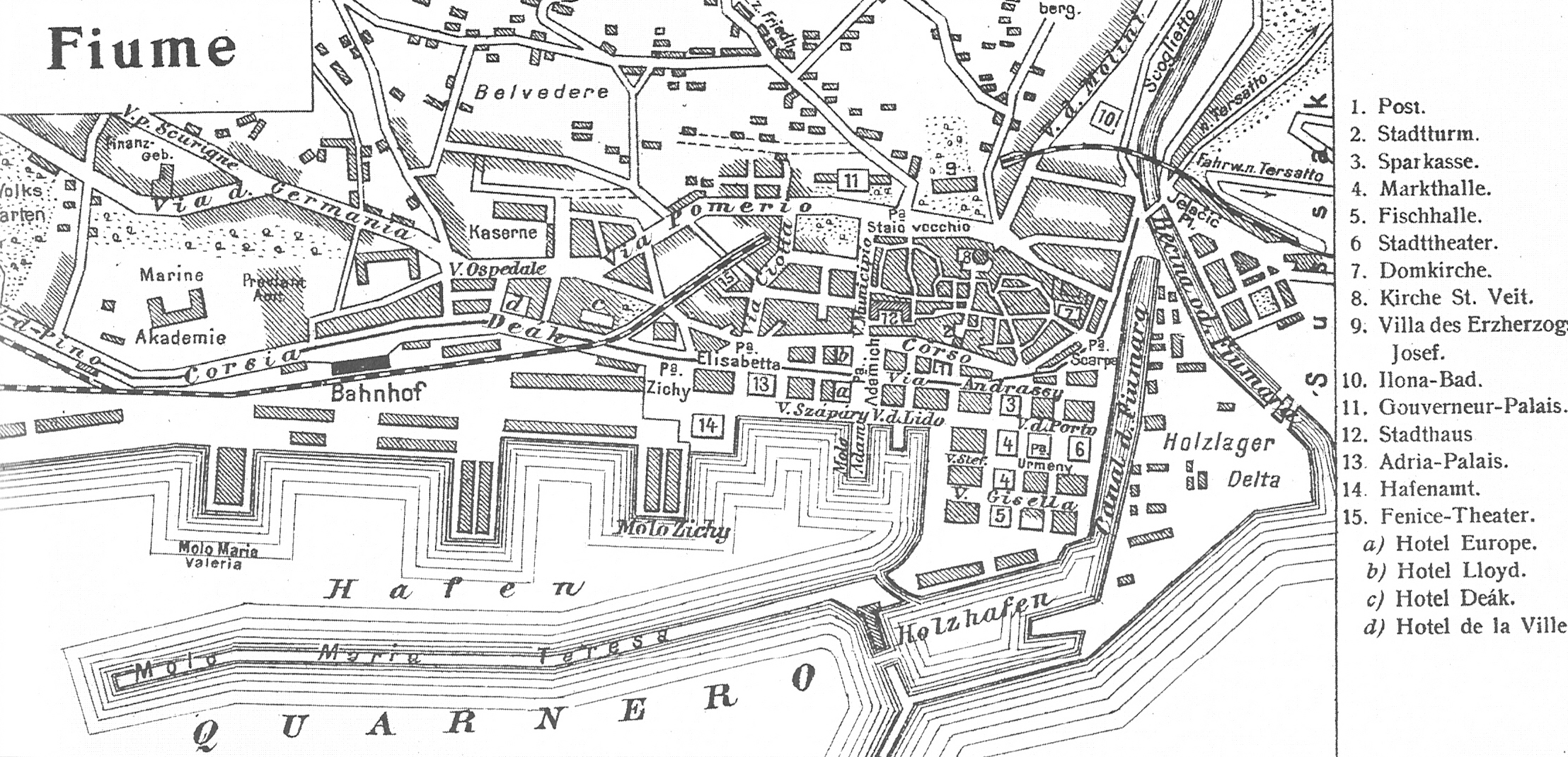
Rijeka around the year 1900

During the Hungarian revolution of 1848, when Hungary tried to gain independence from Austria, Rijeka was captured by the Croatian troops (loyal to Austria) commanded by Ban Josip Jelačić. The city was then annexed directly to Croatia, although it did keep a degree of autonomy.

Giovanni de Ciotta (mayor from 1872 to 1896) proved to be an authoritative local political leader. Under his leadership, an impressive phase of expansion of the city started, marked by major port development, fuelled by the general expansion of international trade and the city's connection (1873) to the Austro-Hungarian railway network. Modern industrial and commercial enterprises such as the Royal Hungarian Sea Navigation Company "Adria", a rival shipping company the Ungaro-Croata (established in 1891) and the Smith and Meynier paper mill (which operated the first steam engine in south-east Europe), situated in the Rječina canyon, producing cigarette paper sold around the world.

The second half of the 19th century and the beginning of the 20th century (up to World War I) was a period of great prosperity, rapid economic growth and technological dynamism for Rijeka. Many authors and witnesses describe Rijeka of this time as a rich, tolerant, well-to-do town which offered a good standard of living, with endless possibilities for making one's fortune. The Pontifical Delegate Celso Costantini noted in his diary "the religious indifference and apathy of the town". The further industrial development of the city included the first industrial scale oil refinery in Europe in 1882 and the first torpedo factory in the world in 1866, after Robert Whitehead, manager of the "Stabilimento Tecnico Fiumano" (an Austrian engineering company engaged in providing engines for the Austro-Hungarian Navy), designed and successfully tested the world's first torpedo. In addition to the Whitehead Torpedo Factory, which opened in 1874, the oil refinery (1882) and the paper mill, many other industrial and commercial enterprises were established or expanded in these years. These include a rice husking and starch factory (one of the largest in the world), a wood and furniture company, a wheat elevator and mill, the Ganz-Danubius shipbuilding industries, a cocoa and chocolate factory, a brick factory, a tobacco factory (the largest in the Monarchy), a cognac distillery, a pasta factory, the Ossoinack barrel and chest factory, a large tannery, five foundries and many others. At the beginning of the 20th century more than half of the industrial capacity in Croatia (which was at that time mostly agrarian) was located in Rijeka.

Rijeka's Austro-Hungarian Marine Academy became a pioneering centre for high-speed photography. The Austrian physicist Peter Salcher working in the Academy took the first photograph of a bullet flying at supersonic speed in 1886, devising a technique that was later used by Ernst Mach in his studies of supersonic motion.

Rijeka's port underwent tremendous development fuelled by generous Hungarian investments, becoming the main maritime outlet for Hungary and the eastern part of the Austro-Hungarian Empire. By 1913–14, the port of Fiume became the tenth-busiest port in Europe. The population grew rapidly from only 21,000 in 1880 to 50,000 in 1910. Major civic buildings constructed at this time include the Governor's Palace, designed by the Hungarian architect Alajos Hauszmann. There was an ongoing competition between Rijeka and Trieste, the main maritime outlet for Austria—reflecting the rivalry between the two components of the Dual Monarchy. The Austro-Hungarian Navy sought to keep the balance by ordering new warships from the shipyards of both cities.

During this period the city had an Italian majority. According to the census of 1880, in Rijeka there were 9,076 Italians, 7,991 Croats, 895 Germans and 383 Hungarians. Some historians claim that the city had a Slavic majority at the beginning of the 19th century, because the 1851 census reported a Croatian majority. However, this census is considered not very reliable by Italian historians. At the last Austro-Hungarian census in 1910, the corpus separatum had a population of 49,806 people and was composed of the following linguistic communities:

Languages in 1911	49,806 inhabitants	(100%)
Italian	23,283	(46.9%)
Croatian	15,731	(31.7%)
Slovenian	3,937	(7.9%)
Hungarian	3,619	(7.3%)
German	2,476	(5.0%)
English	202	(0.4%)
Czech	183	(0.3%)
Serbian	70	(0.14%)
French	40	(0.08%)
Polish	36	(0.07%)
Romanian	29	(0.06%)

By religion, the census of 1910 indicates that - from the total of 49,806 inhabitants - there were 45,130 Catholics, 1,696 Jewish, 1,123 Calvinist, 995 Orthodox and 311 Lutheran. The Jewish population expanded rapidly, particularly in the 1870s-1880s, and built a large synagogue in 1907 (which would be destroyed in 1944, during the German occupation, concurrent with the murder of most of the city's Jewish residents). On the eve of WWI, there were 165 inns, 10 hotels with restaurants, 17 cafés, 17 jewellers, 37 barbers and 265 tailor shops in Rijeka.

Rijeka in early 20th century
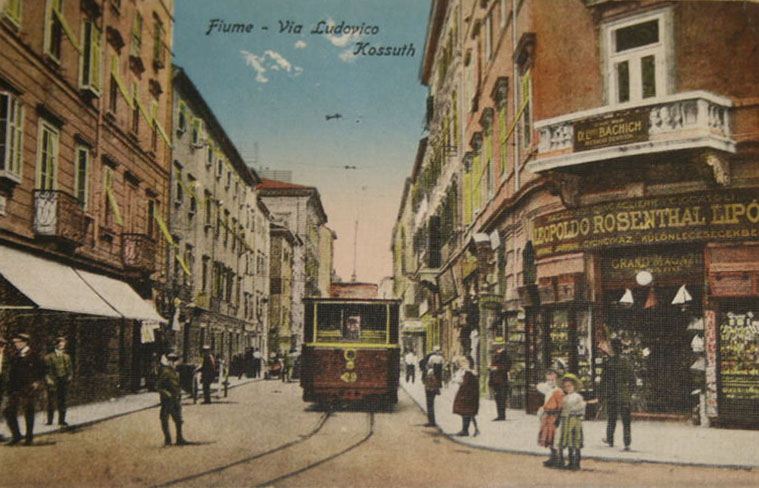
Tram in Rijeka, L. Kossuth Street, c.1910

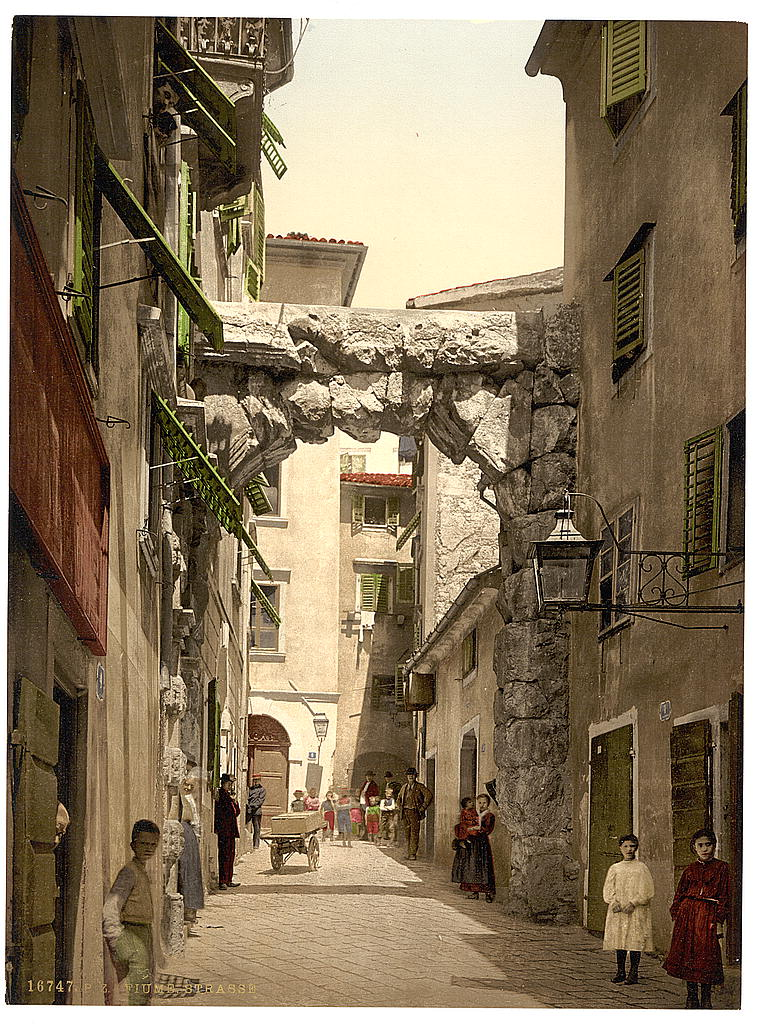
Rijeka, Roman Arch in the Old City, c.1900

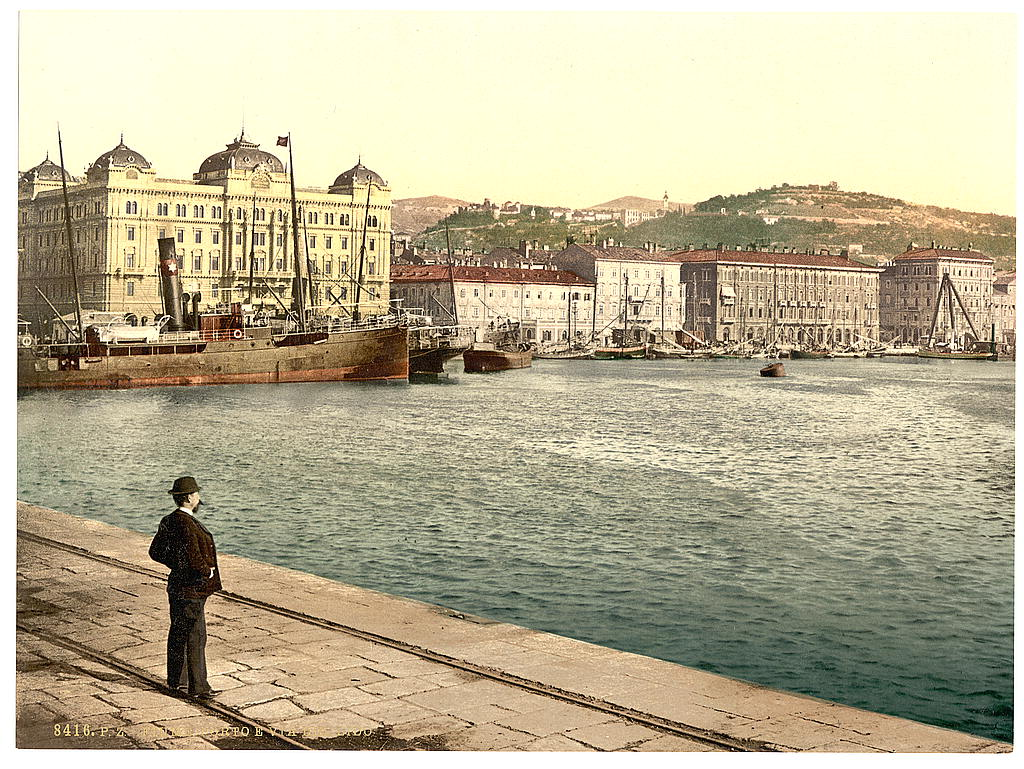
Rijeka Harbor, c.1900

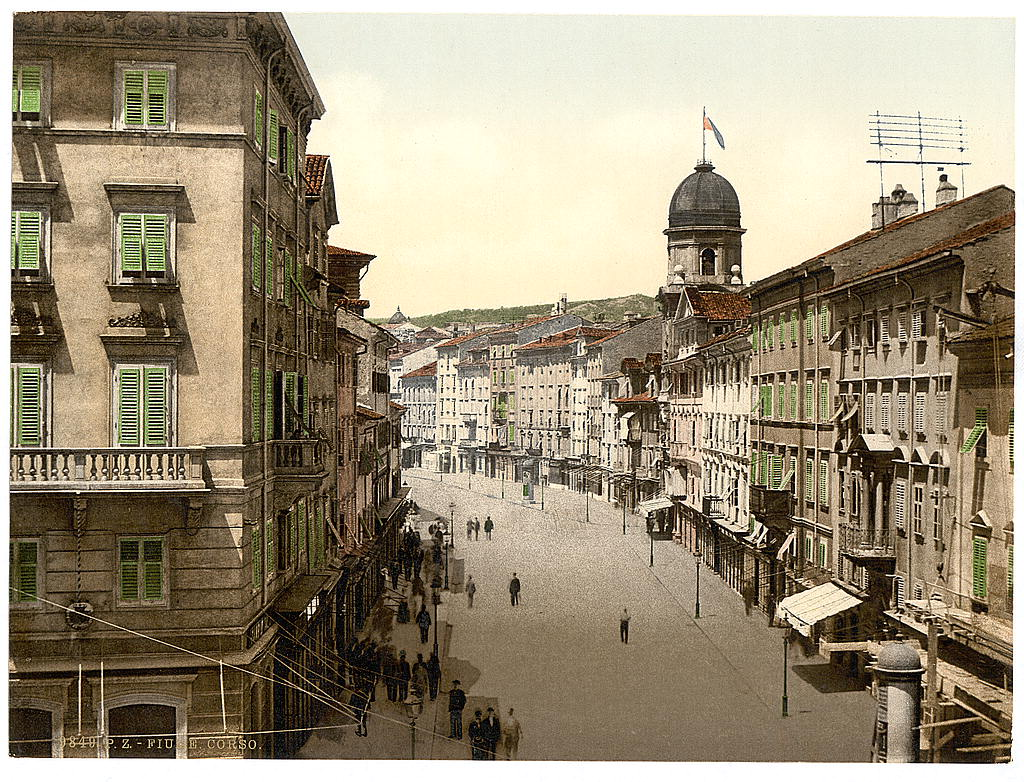
Rijeka - Corso, c. 1900

== The Italo-Yugoslav dispute and the Free State ==
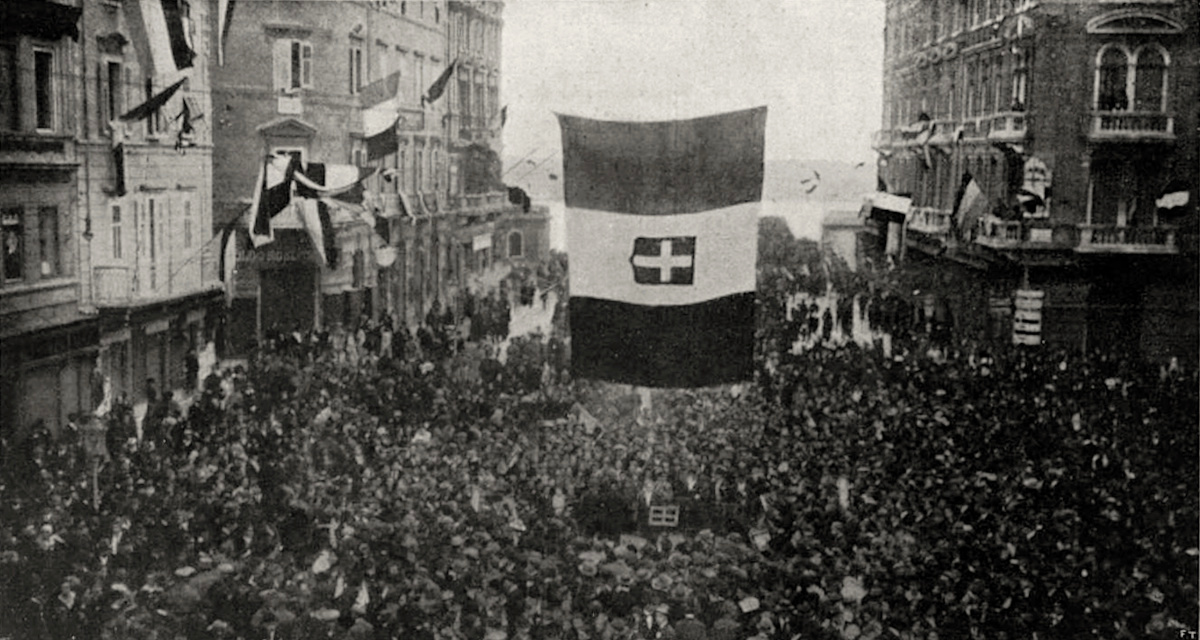
The celebration of the birthday of the Italian King Victor Emmanuel III on November 11, 1918. in Rijeka.

Habsburg-ruled Austria-Hungary's disintegration in October 1918 during the closing weeks of World War I led to the establishment of rival Croatian-Serbian and Italian administrations in the city; both Italy and the founders of the new Kingdom of the Serbs, Croats and Slovenes (later the Kingdom of Yugoslavia) claimed sovereignty based on their "irredentist" ("unredeemed") ethnic populations.

After a brief military occupation by the Kingdom of Serbs, Croats and Slovenes, followed by the unilateral annexation of the former Corpus Separatum by Belgrade, an international force of British, Italian, French and American troops entered the city in November 1918. Its future became a major barrier to agreement during the Paris Peace Conference of 1919. The US president Wilson even proposed to make Rijeka a free city and the headquarters of the newly formed League of Nations.

The main problem arose from the fact that Rijeka was not assigned either to Italy or to Croatia (now Yugoslavia) in the Treaty of London which defined the post-war borders in the area. It remained assigned to Austria-Hungary because - until the very end of WWI - it was assumed that the Austro-Hungarian empire would survive WWI in some form and Rijeka was to become its only seaport (Trieste was to be annexed by Italy). However, once the empire disintegrated, the status of the city became disputed. Italy based its claim on the fact that Italians constituted the largest single nationality within the city (46.9% of the total population), disregarding its mainly Slavic suburb of Susak. Croats made up most of the remainder and were a majority in the surrounding area. Andrea Ossoinack, who had been the last delegate from Fiume to the Hungarian Parliament, was admitted to the conference as a representative of Fiume, and essentially supported the Italian claims. Nevertheless, at this point the city had had for years a strong and very active Autonomist Party seeking for Rijeka a special independent status among nations as a multicultural Adriatic city. This movement even had its delegate at the Paris peace conference - Ruggero Gotthardi.

== The Regency of Carnaro ==
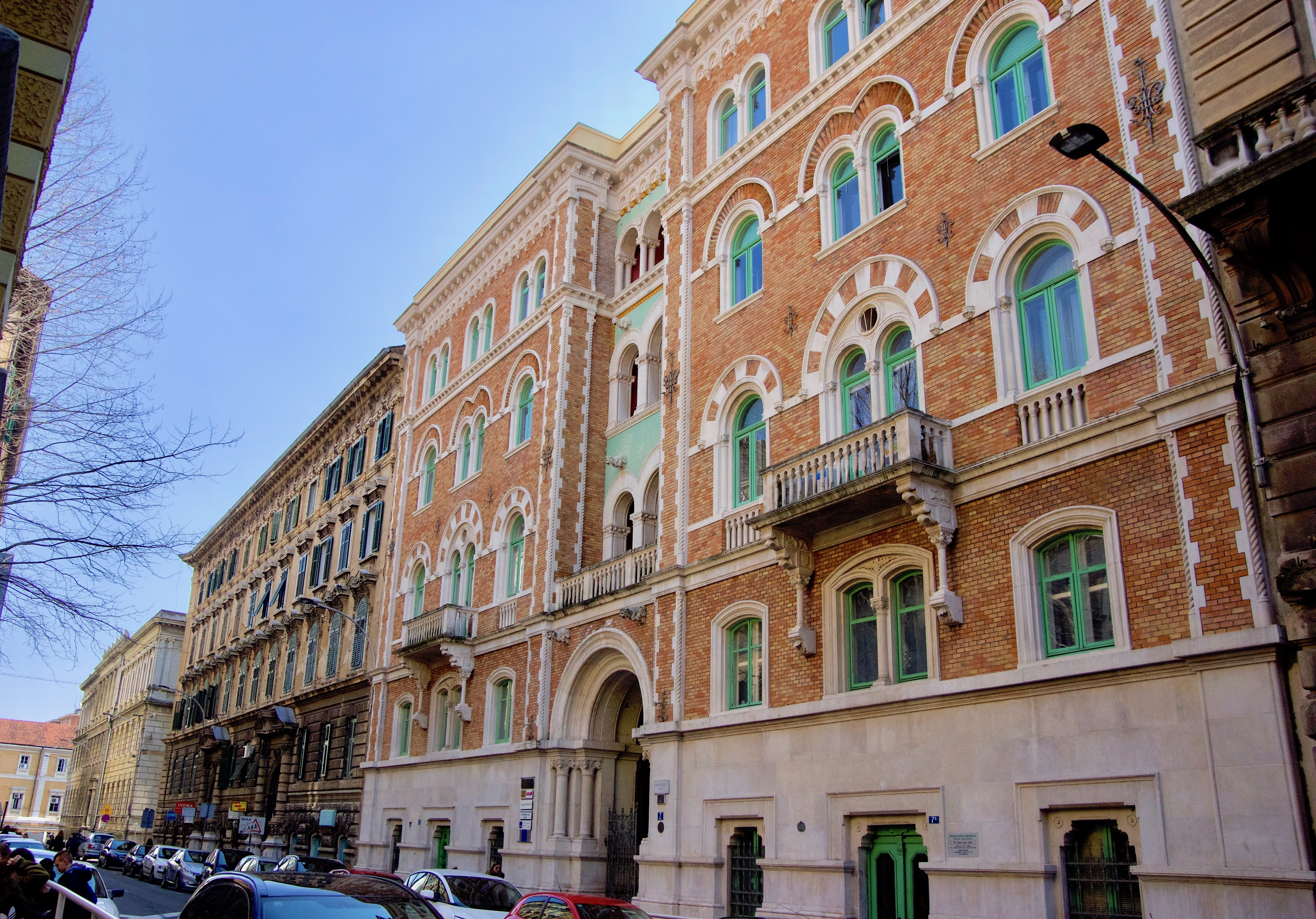
Casa Veneziana in Rijeka

On 10 September 1919, the Treaty of Saint-Germain was signed, declaring the Austro-Hungarian monarchy dissolved. Negotiations over the future of the city were interrupted two days later when a force of Italian nationalist irregulars led by the poet Gabriele D'Annunzio captured the city. Because the Italian government, wishing to respect its international obligations, did not want to annex Fiume, D'Annunzio and the intellectuals at his side eventually established an independent state, the Italian Regency of Carnaro, a unique social experiment for the age and a revolutionary cultural experience in which various international intellectuals of diverse walks of life took part (like Osbert Sitwell, Arturo Toscanini, Henry Furst, Filippo Tommaso Marinetti, Harukichi Shimoi, Guglielmo Marconi, Alceste De Ambris, Whitney Warren and Léon Kochnitzky).

Among the many political experiments that took place during this experience, D'Annunzio and his men undertook a first attempt to establish a movement of non-aligned nations in the so-called League of Fiume, an organisation antithetic to the Wilsonian League of Nations, which it saw as a means of perpetuating a corrupt and imperialist status quo. The organisation was aiming primarily at helping all oppressed nationalities in their struggle for political dignity and recognition, establishing links with many movements on various continents, but it never found the necessary external support and its main legacy remains today the Regency of Carnaro's recognition of Soviet Russia, the first state in the world to have done so.

The Liberal Giovanni Giolitti became Premier of Italy again in June 1920; this signalled a hardening of official attitudes to D'Annunzio's coup. On 12 November, Italy and Yugoslavia concluded the Treaty of Rapallo, which envisaged Fiume becoming an independent state, the Free State of Fiume, under a government acceptable to both powers. D'Annunzio's response was characteristically flamboyant and of doubtful judgment: his declaration of war against Italy invited the bombardment by Italian royal forces which led to his surrender of the city at the end of the year, after five days' resistance (known as Bloody Christmas). Italian troops freed the city from D'Annunzio's militias in the last days of December 1920. After a world war and additional two years of economic paralysis the city economy was nearing collapse and the population was exhausted.

In 1911 the linguistic division of Rijeka was:

Total inhabitants (in 1911)	49,608	%
Italians	23,283	46.9%
Croats	15,731	31.7%
Slovenians	3,937	7.9%
Hungarians	3,619	7.3%
Germans	2,476	5.0%
English	202	0.4%
Czechs	183	0.3%
Serbs	70	0.14%
French	40	0.08%
Poles	36	0.07%
Romanians	29	0.06%

The number of Italians in Rijeka decreased drastically following the Istrian-Dalmatian exodus, which occurred from 1943 to 1960.

== The Free State of Fiume ==
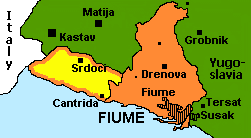
The Free State of Fiume, established in 1920 by the Treaty of Rapallo

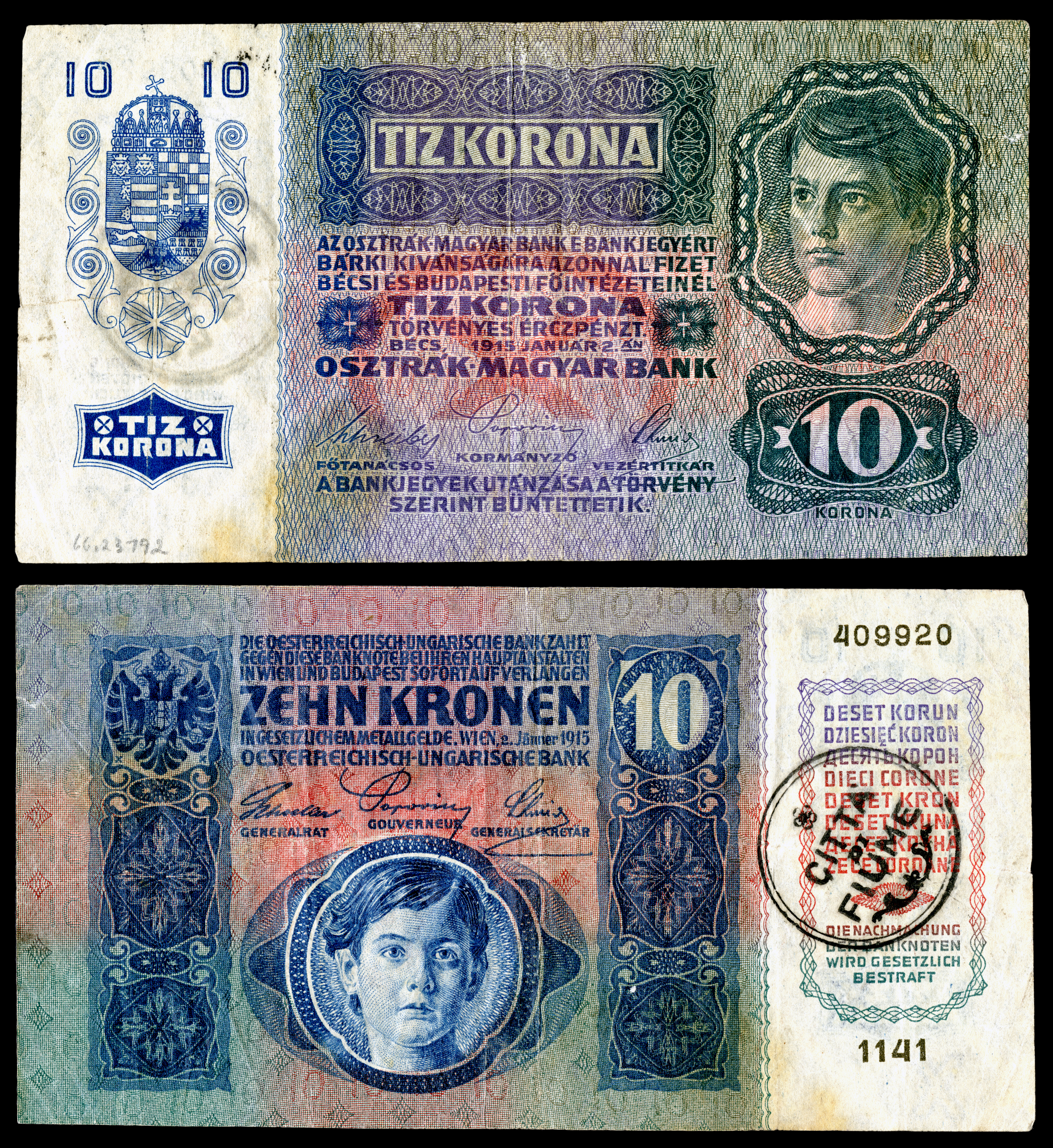
10 Fiume krone provisional banknote (1920)

In a subsequent democratic election the Fiuman electorate on 24 April 1921 approved the idea of a free state of Fiume-Rijeka with a Fiuman-Italo-Yugoslav consortium ownership structure for the port, giving an overwhelming victory to the independentist candidates of the Autonomist Party. Fiume became consequently a full-fledged member of the League of Nations and the ensuing election of Rijeka's first president, Riccardo Zanella, was met with official recognition and greetings from all major powers and countries worldwide. Despite many positive developments leading to the establishment of the new state's structures, the subsequent formation of a constituent assembly for the state did not put an end to strife within the city. A brief Italian nationalist seizure of power ended with the intervention of an Italian royal commissioner, and another short-lived peace was interrupted by a local Fascist putsch in March 1922 which ended with a third Italian intervention to restore the previous order. Seven months later the Kingdom of Italy itself fell under Fascist rule and Fiume's fate was therefore sealed, the Italian Fascist Party being among the strongest proponents of the annexation of Fiume to Italy. The Free State of Fiume thus was to officially become the first country victim of fascist expansionism.

The Free State of Fiume was an independent free state that existed between 1920 and 1924. Its territory of 28 km^{2} (11 sq mi) comprised the city of Fiume (today Rijeka, Croatia) and rural areas to its north, with a corridor to its west connecting it to the Kingdom of Italy. Fiume gained autonomy for the first time in 1719 when it was proclaimed a free port of the Holy Roman Empire in a decree issued by the Emperor Charles VI. In 1776, during the reign of the Empress Maria Theresa, the city was transferred to the Kingdom of Hungary and in 1779 gained the status of corpus separatum within that Kingdom. The city briefly lost its autonomy in 1848 after being occupied by the Croatian ban (viceroy) Josip Jelačić, but regained it in 1868 when it rejoined the Kingdom of Hungary, again as a corpus separatum. Fiume's status as an exclave of Hungary meant that, despite being landlocked, the Kingdom had a port. Until 1924, Fiume existed for practical purposes as an autonomous entity with elements of statehood.

In the 19th century, the city was populated mostly by Italians, and as minorities by Croats and Hungarians, and other ethnicities. National affiliations changed from census to census, as at that time "nationality" was defined mostly by the language a person spoke. The special status of the city, being placed between different states, created a local identity among the majority of the population. The official languages in use were Italian, Hungarian, and German; most of the business correspondence was carried out in Italian, while most families spoke a local dialect, a blend of Venetian with a few words of Croatian. In the countryside outside the city, a particular kind of Croatian Chakavian dialect with many Italian and Venetian words was spoken.

== The territory of Fiume part of the Kingdom of Italy ==
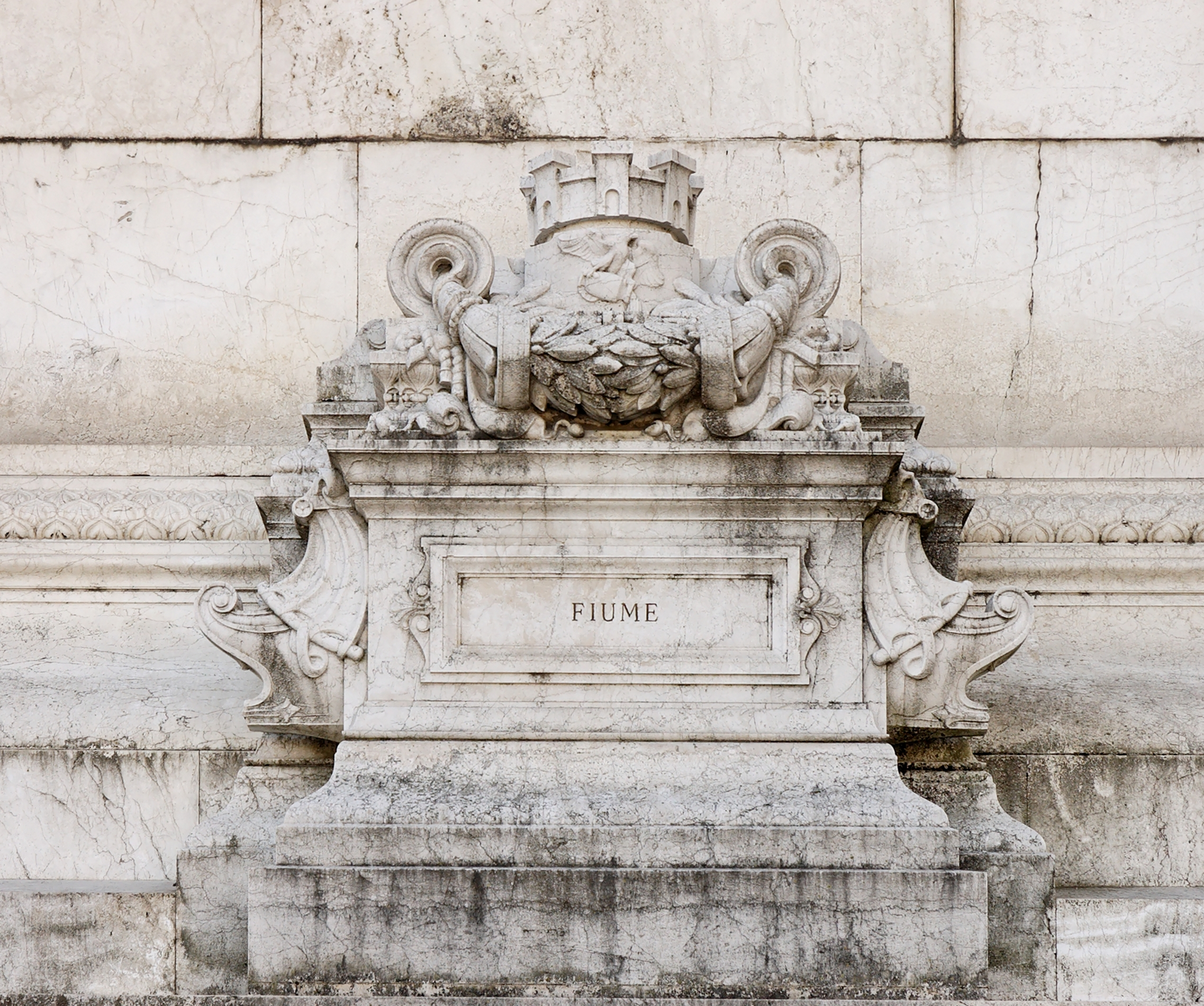
Altar of the city of Fiume at the Altare della Patria in Rome, Italy. Fiume was at the time a so-called "irredent land"

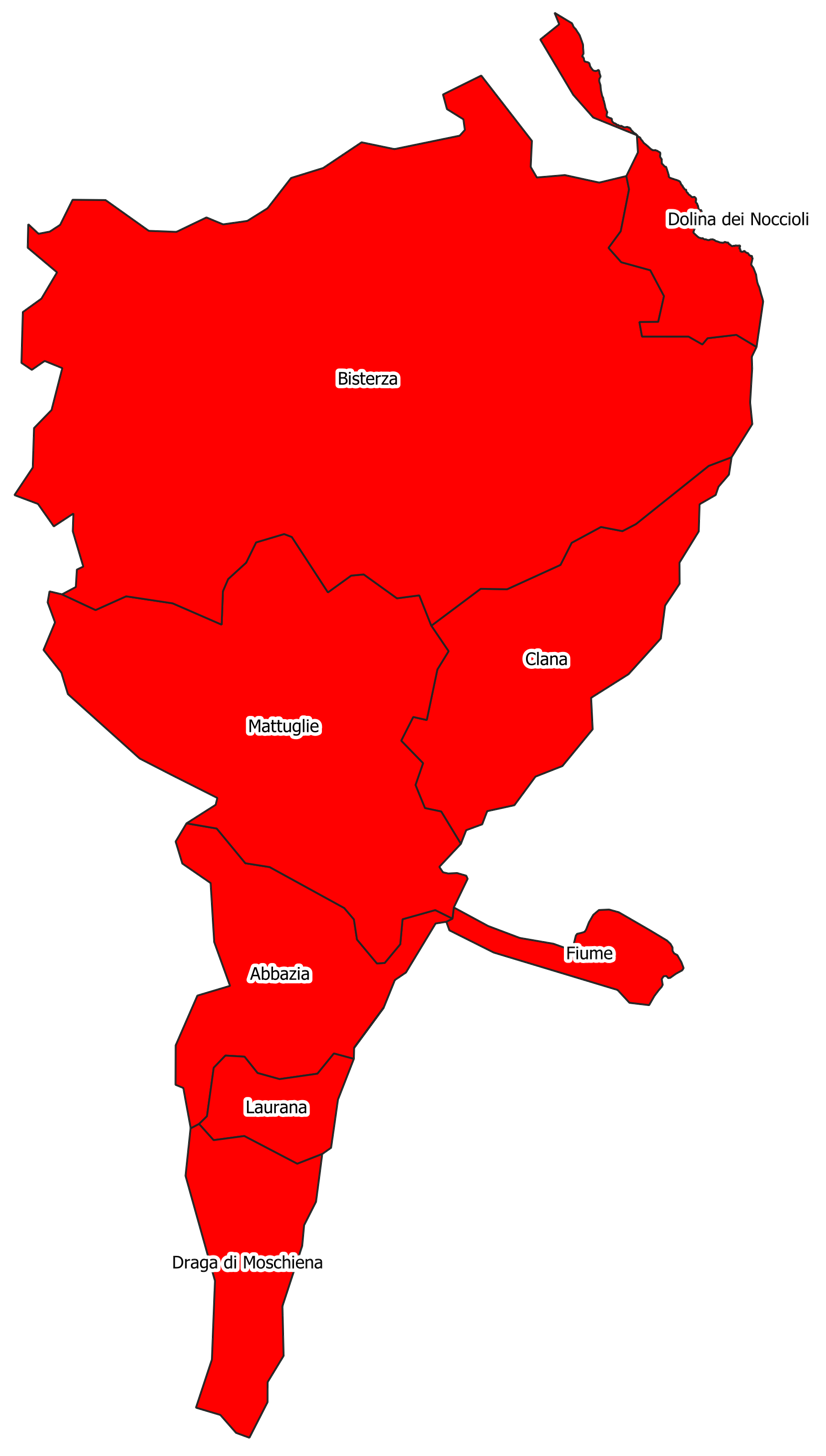
Italian province of Fiume, 1924

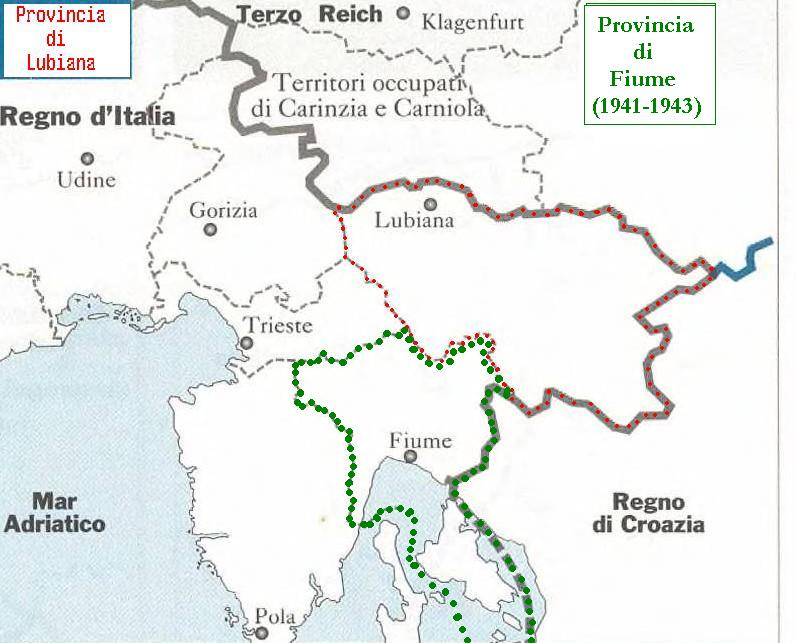
Province of Fiume, April 1941 – September 1943. The isles of Krk and Rab are included.

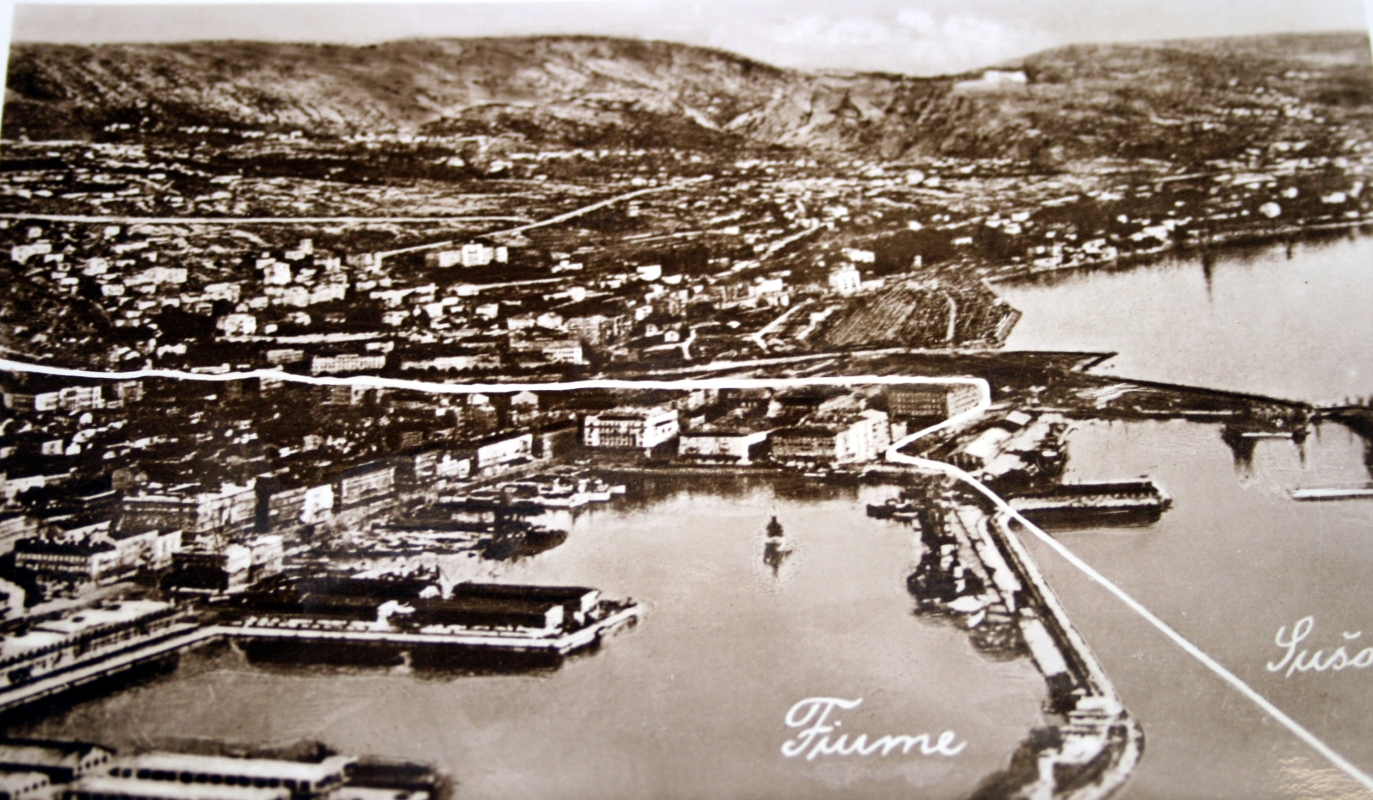
Fiume (Rijeka) in 1937

The period of diplomatic acrimony was closed by the bilateral Treaty of Rome (27 January 1924), signed by Italy and Yugoslavia. With it the two neighbouring countries agreed to partition the territory of the small state. Most of the old Corpus Separatum territory became part of Italy, while a few Croatian/Slovenian-speaking villages to the north of the city were annexed by Yugoslavia. The annexation happened de facto on 16 March 1924, and it inaugurated about twenty years of Italian government for the city proper, to the detriment of the Croatian minority, which fell victim of discrimination and targeted assimilation policies.

The city became the seat of the newly formed Province of Fiume. In this period Fiume lost its commercial hinterland and thus part of its economic potential as it became a border town with little strategic importance for the Kingdom of Italy. However, since it retained the Free Port status and its iconic image in the nation-building myth, it gained many economic concessions and subsidies from the government in Rome. These included a separate tax treatment from the rest of Italy and a continuous inflow of investments from the Italian state (although not as generous as previous Hungarian ones). The city regained a good level of economic prosperity and was much richer than the surrounding Yugoslav lands, but the economic and demographic growth slowed down if compared to the previous Austro-Hungarian period.

The Province of Fiume (or Province of Carnaro) was a province of the Kingdom of Italy from 1924 to 1943, then under control of the Italian Social Republic and German Wehrmacht from 1943 to 1945. Its capital was the city of Fiume. It took the other name after the Gulf of Carnaro (Golfo del Carnaro). The province was divided into 13 municipalities and in 1938 had an area of 1,121.29 km^{2} (432.93 sq mi) with a population of 109,018 inhabitants and a population density of 109 inhabitants per square kilometre (280/sq mi).

Fiume had been occupied since September 1919 by a private force led by the nationalist poet Gabriele D'Annunzio, disilluded with Italy's management of the Fiume question after the end of the First World War. D'Annunzio's initiative was a personal one, however, and the Italian army evacuated the poet's soldiers. With the Treaty of Rapallo Fiume and its immediate surroundings, counting around 50,000 Italian-speakers and 13,000 Croatian-speakers, were declared a free city.

Nationalist and fascists kept on pushing for a direct annexation of Fiume; after a staged coup in 1922, the city was militarily occupied by the Regio Esercito. The province was finally created in 1924, with the Treaty of Rome, when the territory of the former State was split up between Yugoslavia and Italy, with the latter receiving Fiume.

The new province was formed by the coastal zone of the Free State, which became the district (circondario) of Fiume; and by the district of Volosca-Abbazia, formerly within the province of Pola. In 1928, districts were abolished and two other municipalities passed under the jurisdiction of Fiume, Matteria and Castelnuovo d'Istria.

From April 1941 to September 1943 the Italian province of Fiume was enlarged after the victory of the Axis powers over Yugoslavia, with the addition of the Fiuman eastern hinterland and the Carnaro isles of Krk and Rab. Some among the local inhabitants started a resistance movement against Italian occupation in these newly annexed zones; Italian military authorities tried to repress this objection with severe measures.

When the Armistice of Italy with the Allied was signed, on 8 September 1943, the former province of Fiume fell under Hitler's Germany (OZAK), and Carnaro and Fiume led one of Italy's highest death rates from Nazi death camps, fourth behind Gorizia, Florence, and Genoa. Amongst those arrested was Giovanni Palatucci, the Italian questore of Fiume, who saved the lives of thousands of Jews. He also created a Committee comprising both Italians and Slavic partisans, as well as Jews, as an attempt to safeguard the independence of Fiume once Germany would have been defeated. He was deported to Dachau and died there in 1945.

Following Palatucci's dismissal, his powers of questore directly passed to GESTAPO, and Italian sovereignty on the area was seriously compromised; in April 1945, the Yugoslav 4th army, composed mostly of Croats and Slovenes, advanced into the Rijeka hinterland amidst heavy fighting with the German and other Axis forces still present there. Only in 1947, however, was the Italian province of Fiume formally abolished in accordance with international law and its entry into Yugoslavia was acknowledged.

Nowadays, its former territory roughly corresponds to Primorje-Gorski Kotar County in Croatia.

== Rijeka in World War II ==
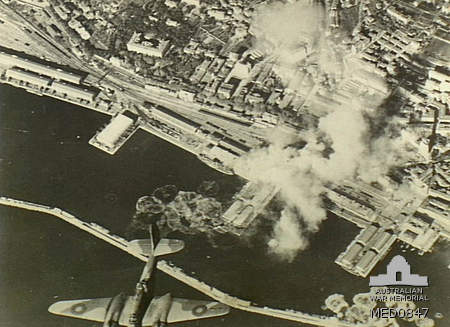
Rijeka under aerial bombardment by the Royal Air Force, 1944

At the beginning of World War II Rijeka immediately found itself in an awkward position. The city's largest demographic was Italian followed by Croatian constituting most of the remainder, but its immediate surroundings and the city of Sušak, just across the Rječina river (today a part of Rijeka proper) were inhabited almost exclusively by Croatians and part of a potentially hostile power—Yugoslavia. Once the Axis powers invaded Yugoslavia in April 1941, the Croatian areas surrounding the city were occupied by the Italian military, setting the stage for an intense and bloody insurgency which would last until the end of the war. Partisan activity included guerrilla-style attacks on isolated positions or supply columns, sabotage and killings of civilians believed to be connected to the Italian and (later) German authorities. This, in turn, was met by stiff reprisals from the Italian and German military. On 14 July 1942, in reprisal for the killing of four civilians of Italian origin by Partisans, the Italian military killed 100 men from the suburban village of Podhum, deporting the remaining 800 people to concentration camps.

After the surrender of Italy to the Allies in September 1943, Rijeka and the surrounding territories were occupied and annexed by Germany, becoming part of the Adriatic Littoral Zone. Partisan activity continued and intensified. On 30 April 1944, in the nearby village of Lipa, German troops killed 263 civilians in reprisal for the killing of several soldiers during a Partisan attack.

The German and Italian occupiers and their local collaborators deported some 80 percent of the city's roughly 500 Jews to Auschwitz. A larger proportion of Rijeka's Jewish population was murdered in the Holocaust than that of any other city in Italian territory.

Because of its industries (oil refinery, torpedo factory, shipyards) and its port facilities, the city was also a target of more than 30 Anglo-American air attacks, which caused widespread destruction and hundreds of civilian deaths. Some of the heaviest bombardments happened on 12 January 1944 (attack on the refinery, part of the oil campaign), on 3–6 November 1944, when a series of attacks resulted in at least 125 deaths and between 15 and 25 February 1945 (200 dead, 300 wounded).

The area of Rijeka was heavily fortified even before World War II (the remains of these fortifications can be seen today on the outskirts of the city). This was the fortified border between Italy and Yugoslavia which, at that time, cut across the city area and its surroundings. As Yugoslav troops approached the city in April 1945, one of the fiercest and largest battles in this area of Europe ensued. The 27,000 German and additional Italian RSI troops fought tenaciously from behind these fortifications (renamed "Ingridstellung"—Ingrid Line—by the Germans). Under the command of the German general Ludwig Kübler they inflicted thousands of casualties on the attacking Partisans, which were forced by their superiors to charge uphill against well-fortified positions to the north and east of the city. The Yugoslav commanders did not spare casualties to speed up the capture of the city, fearing a possible English landing in the area which would prevent their advance towards Trieste before the war was over. After an extremely bloody battle and heavy losses on the attackers side, the Germans were forced to retreat. Before leaving the city the German troops destroyed much of the harbour area and other important infrastructure with explosive charges. However, the German attempt to break out of the encirclement north-west of the city was unsuccessful. Of the approximately 27,000 German and other troops retreating from the city, of which 16,000 were taken as prisoners. Yugoslav troops entered Rijeka on 3 May 1945. The city had suffered extensive damage in the war. The economic infrastructure was almost completely destroyed, and of the 5,400 buildings in the city at the time, 2,890 (53%) were either completely destroyed or damaged.

== Post–World War II exodus of Italians ==
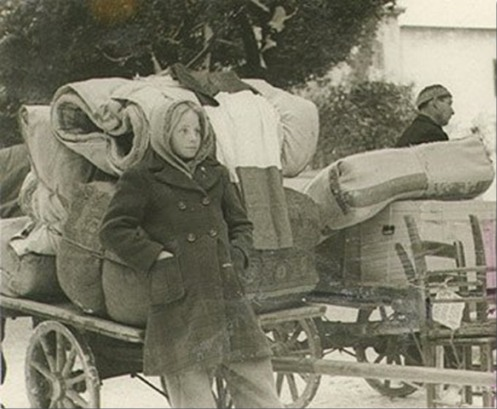
A young Italian exile on the run carries her personal effects and a flag of Italy in 1945

The city's fate was once again solved by a combination of force and diplomacy. Despite insistent requests from the Fiuman government in exile collaboration with the partisans and calls to respect the city-state's internationally recognized sovereignty, and despite generous initial promises given by the Yugoslav authorities of full independence and later of extensive autonomy for the city-state (the locals were promised various degrees of autonomy at different moments during the war, most notably the possibility to be a state of the Federal Republic of Yugoslavia), the city was annexed by Yugoslavia and incorporated as part of the federal state of Croatia. All the many voices of dissent within the population were silenced in the 12 months following the end of the war. The situation created by the Yugoslav forces on the ground was eventually formalized by the 1947 Paris peace treaty between Italy and the Allies on 10 February 1947, despite both the complaints by the last democratically elected government and its president-in-exile Riccardo Zanella and the attempts of the experienced Italian foreign minister Carlo Sforza to uphold the previous Wilsonian plans for a multicultural Free State solution, with a local headquarters for the newly created United Nations.

The discrimination and persecution that many inhabitants experienced at the hands of Yugoslav officials, in the last days of World War II and the first years of peace, still remain painful memories for the locals and the esuli, and are somewhat of a taboo topic for Rijeka's political milieu, which is still largely denying the events. Summary executions of alleged Fascists (often well-known anti-fascists or openly apolitical), aimed at hitting the local intellectual class, the Autonomists, the commercial classes, the former Italian public servants, the military officials and often also ordinary civilians (at least 650 executions of Italians took place after the end of the war) eventually forced most Italophones (of various ethnicities) to leave Rijeka/Fiume in order to avoid becoming victims of a harsher retaliation. The removal was a meticulously planned operation, aimed at convincing the hardly assimilable Italian part of the autochthonous population to leave the country, as testified decades later by representatives of the Yugoslav leadership.

The most notable victims of the political and ethnic repression of locals in this period was the Fiume Autonomists purge hitting all the autonomist figures still living in the city, and now associated in the Liburnian Autonomist Movement. The Autonomists, despite receiving various promises of large political autonomy for the city, they were eventually all assassinated by the Yugoslav secret police OZNA in the days leading up to the Yugoslav army's victorious march into city and its aftermath.

In subsequent years, the Yugoslav authorities joined the municipalities of Rijeka and Sušak and, after 1954, less than one third of the original population of the now united municipalities (mostly what was previously the Croat minority in Fiume and the majority in Sušak) remained in the city, because the old municipality of Fiume lost in these years more than 85% of the original population. In the 1950s the city ceased to be functionally bilingual, except in schools and institutions reserved for the Italian-speaking minority. After the war the local ethnic Italians of Rijeka left Yugoslavia for Italy (Istrian-Dalmatian exodus).

== Within Yugoslavia ==
The city was then resettled by immigrants from various parts of Yugoslavia, once more changing heavily the city's demographics and its linguistic composition. These years coincided also with a period of general reconstruction and new program of industrialization after the destruction of the war. During the period of the Yugoslav Communist administration between the 1950s and the 1980s, the city became the main port of the Federal Republic and started to grow once again, both demographically and economically, taking advantage of the newly re-established hinterland that had been lacking during the Italian period, as well as the rebuilding after the war of its traditional manufacturing industries, its maritime economy and its port potential. This, paired with its rich commercial history, allowed the city to soon become the second richest (GDP per capita) district within Yugoslavia. However, many of these industries and companies, being based on a socialist planned economic model were not able to survive the move to a market-oriented economy in the early 1990s.h of St. Nicholas (1981–1988).

== Within independent Croatia ==
As Yugoslavia broke up in 1991, the former Federal State of Croatia became independent and, in the Croatian War of Independence that ensued, Rijeka became part of the newly independent Croatia. Since then, the city has stagnated economically and its demography has plunged. Some of its largest industries and employers have gone out of business, the most prominent among them being the Jugolinija shipping company, the torpedo factory, the paper mill and many other small or medium manufacturing and commercial companies. Other companies have struggled to remain economically viable (like the city's landmark 3. Maj shipyard). The number of people working in manufacturing dropped from more than 80,000 in 1990 to only 5,000 two decades later. Privatization scandals and the large scale corruption which marked Croatia's transition from socialism to capitalism as well as several years of war economy played a significant role in the collapse of the city's economy during the 1990s and early 2000s. A difficult and uncertain transition of the city's economy away from manufacturing and towards an economy based on services and tourism is still in progress.

In 2018, it was announced that, 65 years after the abolition of Italian as the official language of the city, new Croatian-Italian bilingual signs will be placed back in the Fiume part of the modern united municipality. In 2020, Rijeka was voted the European Capital of Culture alongside Galway, with a planned program including more than 600 events of cultural and social importance.

== See also ==
- Corpus separatum (Fiume)
- Postage stamps and postal history of Fiume
- List of governors and heads of state of Fiume
- Other names of Rijeka
- Timeline of Rijeka history
- Imperial Estate
- Free Imperial City
- List of states of the Holy Roman Empire
- History of Croatia
- History of Slovenia
- History of Austria
- History of Hungary
