= Fiume (disambiguation) =

Fiume is the historical name of Rijeka, a city in Croatia.

Fiume may also refer to:

Geography

- Free State of Fiume, a historic state that existed between 1920 and 1924
- Fiume Veneto, a municipality in the Italian region Friuli-Venezia Giulia
- Fiume di Girgenti, a river of Sicily rising from hills south of the city of Agrigento
- Fiume Grande, a river of northern Sicily flowing into the Tyrrhenian sea near Palermo

Other

- Italian cruiser Fiume of the Italian Regia Marina
- Gloria Fiume, an old Italian football association now renamed HNK Rijeka
- Paolo Dal Fiume, Italian footballer
- Salvatore Fiume, an Italian painter, sculptor, architect and writer
