= Postage stamps and postal history of Fiume =

After World War I, the city of Fiume (now Rijeka, Croatia) was claimed by both the Kingdom of Serbs, Croats and Slovenes and Italy. While its status was unresolved, its postal system was operated by a variety of occupation forces and local governments.

== Allied Occupation ==
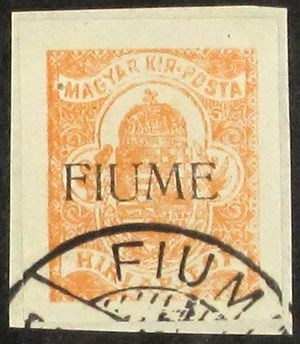
Hungarian stamp overprinted, 1918

An international force of British and French troops took over the city between 17 November 1918 and 12 September 1919.

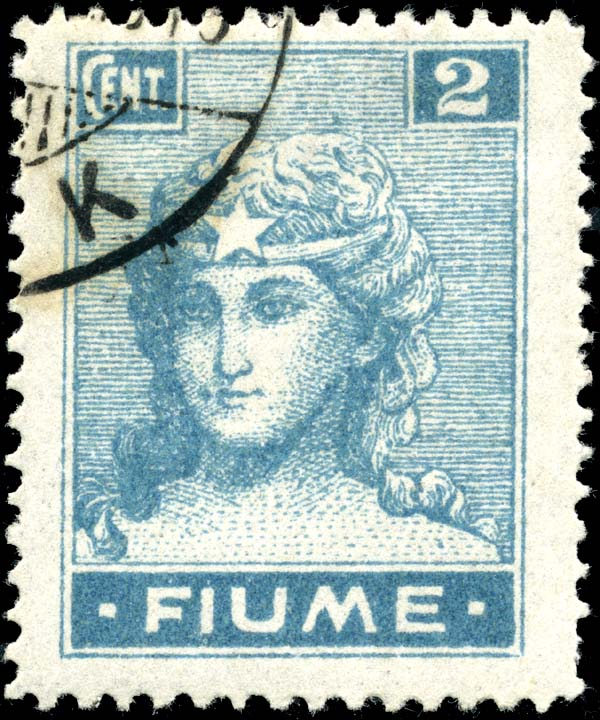
Personification of "Italy", 1919

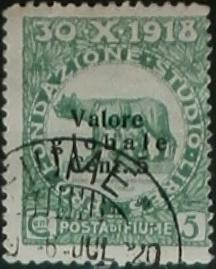
Semi-postal overprinted "Valore globale"

The first postage stamps for Fiume were issued 1 December 1918 by the Italian National Council which governed the city. They were produced by overprinting "FIUME" on the contemporary stamps of Hungary. Both handstamping and printing presses were used. In January 1919, two postage due and a savings bank stamp were surcharged as well. These stamps—even the most common values—were extensively forged. Serious collectors will require close examination of all stamps.

January also saw the first appearance of an issue produced specifically for Fiume. It consisted of 17 values, ranging from 2 centesimi to 10 corone, and used four designs: a figure representing "Italy", the town clock tower with an Italian flag hanging from it, an allegory of "Revolution", and a sailor raising the Italian flag. The first printings were inscribed just "FIUME", while in July they were redesigned with the inscription "POSTA FIUME", along with other minor changes. Meanwhile, a set of 12 semi-postal stamps was issued 18 May, commemorating the 200th day of peace since the end of the war.

Later in 1919 the higher values were surcharged with lower values, and the semi-postals were overprinted "Valore globale" for use as regular stamps.

== The Regency of Carnaro ==
This confusing situation was exploited by the Italian poet Gabriele d'Annunzio, who entered the city on 12 September 1919 and began a 15-month period of occupation. On 8 September 1920, d'Annunzio established the Italian Regency of Carnaro in Fiume. On 12 September, 1920, the first anniversary of the city's takeover by the forces of Gabriele d'Annunzio, the city government issued a series of 14 values featuring a portrait bust of d'Annunzio, intended for regular use. A set of four with various allegorical designs was issued, intended for the use of the legionnaires on that day only.

On 18 November, the set of four of 12 September were overprinted "ARBE" and "VEGLIA", marking the occupation of the islands of Arbe and Veglia, and on 20 November, more were overprinted "Reggenza / Italiana / del / Carnaro" (Italian Regency of Carnaro), and with new values.

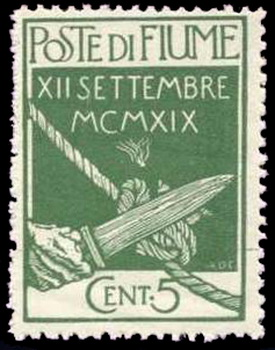
A dagger severing the Gordian Knot

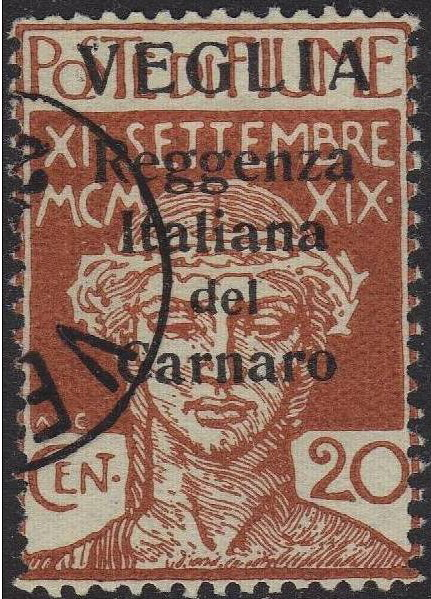
Stamp overprinted "Reggenza / Italiana / del / Carnaro"

== Free State of Fiume ==
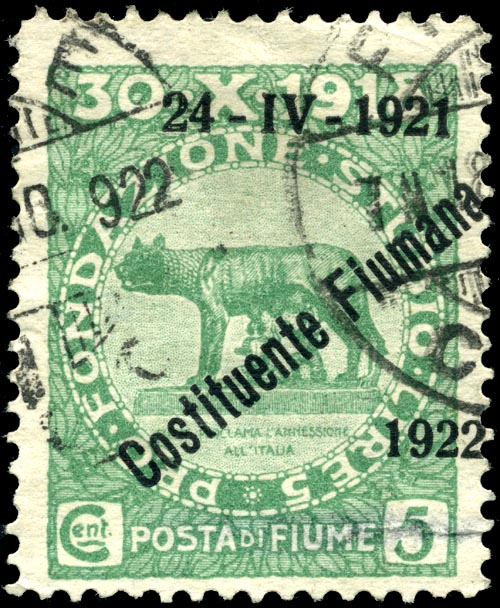
2nd constituent assembly issue, 1922

In January 1921, Italian troops put an end to d'Annunzio's rule, and the subsequent provisional government overprinted the d'Annunzio heads with "Governo / Provvisorio".

On 24 April 1921, the 1st constituent assembly of the Free State overprinted the semi-postals of 1919 with "24 - IV - 1921" and "Costituente Fiumana". The following year the 2nd assembly added a "1922" to the overprints.

On 23 March, 1923 a new issue put an end to the flurry of overprints. Its 12 values, inscribed "Posta di Fiume", used four designs, a Venetian sailing ship, a Roman arch, St. Vitus, and a rostral column, all printed over a buff-colored background. After the Treaty of Rome assigned Fiume to Italy (27 January), these stamps were overprinted "REGNO / D'ITALIA" (Kingdom of Italy) on 22 February and then "ANNESSIONE / ALL'ITALIA" (Annexation by Great-Italy) on 1 March. Subsequently Fiume used the stamps of Italy.

== See also ==
- Free State of Fiume

== References and Sources ==
- Stanley Gibbons Ltd: various catalogues
- Encyclopaedia of Postal Authorities
- Rossiter, Stuart & John Flower. The Stamp Atlas. London: Macdonald, 1986. ISBN 0-356-10862-7
- Scott catalog
