= Fiume krone =

Corona Fiumana (Italian)
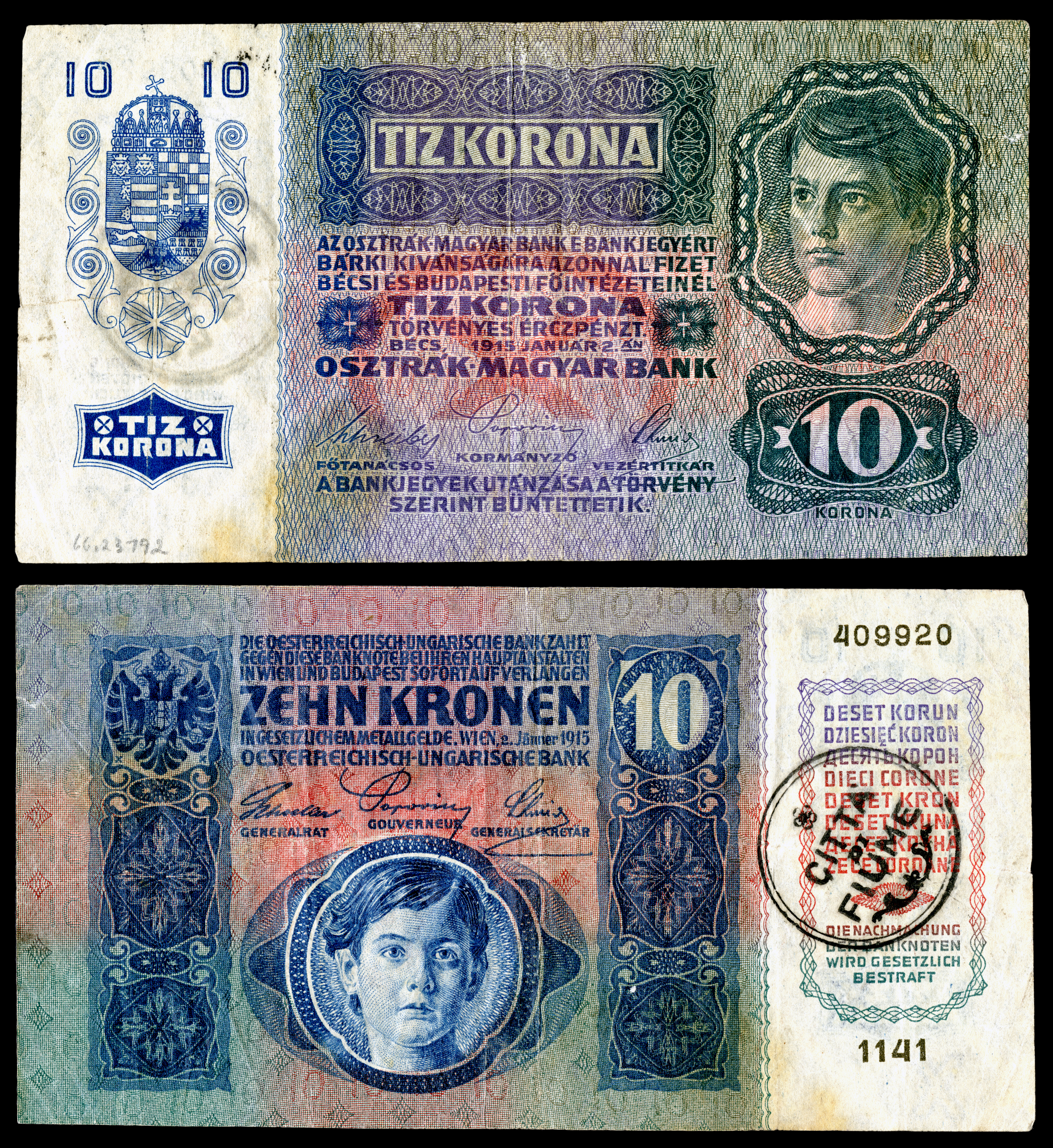

Unit
- Symbol: Cor., FIUK

Denominations
- Banknotes: 1, 2, 10, 20, 25, 50, 100, 200, 1000, 10 000 Cor.

Demographics
- User(s): Free State of Fiume

Issuance
- Central bank: Italian National Council of Fiume

The Fiume krone (Croatian: Riječka kruna, Italian: Corona Fiumana, abbreviated Cor. or FIUK) was a currency used in the Free State of Fiume. It was introduced on 18 April 1919 by the National Council of Fiume who effectively exercised power in the City through stamping of the previous Austro-Hungarian krone notes. After the occupation by Gabriele D'Annunzio in September 1919, a new series of notes were stamped on behalf of the Istituto di credito del Consiglio Nazionale with a decree dated 6 October 1919. The Fiume krone was the official currency of the city of Fiume until 26 September 1920 when, by the decree of General Amantea who was commanding the Italian troops in Fiume, the Italian lira was introduced as the new official currency.

The currency continued to circulate until the annexation of the city to Italy in February 1924. The royal decree n 235 of 24 February 1924 set the final conversion date on 30 April 1924, at 0.40 Italian lira for one Fiume krone.

== Exchange rates ==
In November 1919, one Fiume krone was worth 3 Yugoslav krone or 40 Italian centesimi. On the black market however, one Fiume krone sold for 21 centesimi.

Preceded by: Austro-Hungarian Krone; Reason: dissolution of the Austro-Hungarian Empire; Ratio: at par Note: Overstamping of banknotes of the Austro-Hungarian Krone	Currency of Fiume; October 1919 – September 1920	Succeeded by: Italian Lira; Reason: consolidation of currency situation Ratio: 1 Lira = 2.5 Kronen
