= Rijeka, Olovo =

Village in Olovo, Bosnia and Herzegovina

Rijeka
- Village
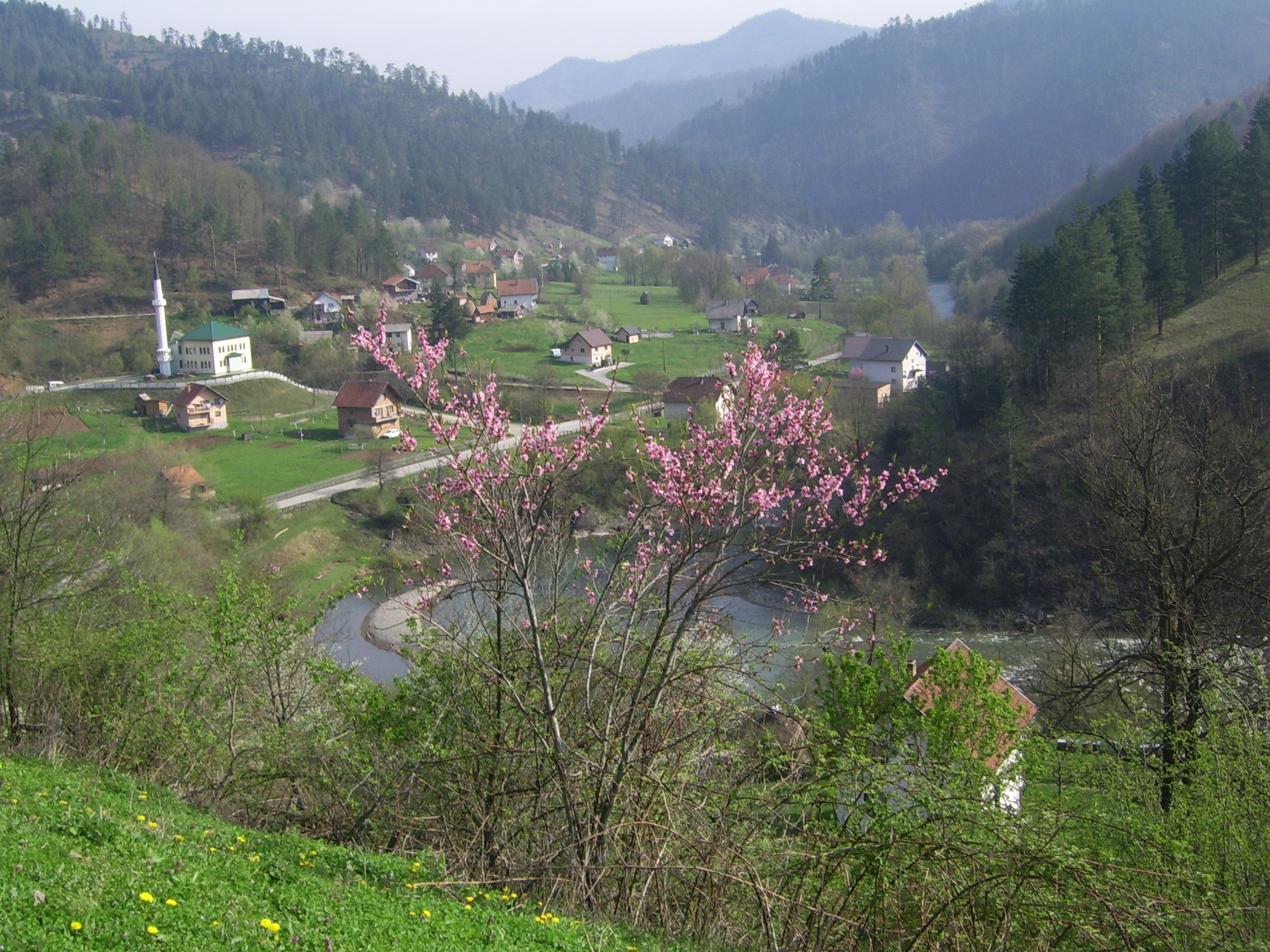
- Interactive map of Rijeka
- Location within Bosnia and Herzegovina
- Coordinates: 44.2593859°N 18.4132684°E
- Country: Bosnia and Herzegovina
- Entity: Federation of Bosnia and Herzegovina
- Canton: Zenica-Doboj
- Municipality: Olovo

Area
  - Total: 13.42 sq mi (34.76 km^{2})

Population (2013)
  - Total: 532
  - Density: 39.6/sq mi (15.3/km^{2})
- Time zone: UTC+1 (CET)
  - Summer (DST): UTC+2 (CEST)

Rijeka is a village in the municipality of Olovo, Bosnia and Herzegovina.

== Demographics ==
According to the 2013 census, its population was 532.

Ethnicity in 2013
Ethnicity	Number	Percentage
Bosniaks	508	95.5%
Croats	14	2.6%
other/undeclared	10	1.9%
Total	532	100%
