= Rijeka, Vitez =

Rijeka
- Village
- Location within Bosnia and Herzegovina
- Coordinates: 44.1402385°N 17.7964458°E
- Country: Bosnia and Herzegovina
- Entity: Federation of Bosnia and Herzegovina
- Canton: Central Bosnia
- Municipality: Vitez

Area
  - Total: 1.01 sq mi (2.61 km^{2})

Population (2013)
  - Total: 1,221
  - Density: 1,210/sq mi (468/km^{2})
- Time zone: UTC+1 (CET)
  - Summer (DST): UTC+2 (CEST)

Rijeka is a village in the municipality of Vitez, Bosnia and Herzegovina.

== Demographics ==
According to the 2013 census, its population was 1,221.

Ethnicity in 2013
Ethnicity	Number	Percentage
Croats	1,097	89.8%
Bosniaks	97	7.9%
Serbs	17	1.4%
other/undeclared	10	0.8%
Total	1,221	100%
