= Italian National Council of Fiume =

The Italian National Council of Fiume was a political body that governed the city of Fiume between 1918 and 1924.

== History ==
=== Creation ===
Emperor Charles I of Austria, after Foreign Minister Baron István Burián asked for an armistice based on the Fourteen Points on 14 October 1918, issued two days later a proclamation that radically changed the nature of the Austrian state. According to the Volkermanifest the Poles were granted full independence with the purpose of joining their ethnic brethren in Russia and Germany in a Polish state. To prevent the total collapse of the monarchy the rest of the Austrian lands were transformed into a federal union composed of four parts—German, Czech, South Slav and Ukrainian. Each of the four parts was to be governed by a federal council, and Trieste was to receive a special status.

On the evening of the 28 October, Zoltán Jekelfalussy, the Hungarian governor of Fiume, called Mayor Antonio Vio to his office to give him the news that the Hungarian Government had decided that Fiume was to be abandoned both militarily and politically. The members of the Municipal Council knew they could no longer base its right to authority on his appointment by a power that no longer existed in its previous form. The Municipal Council invoking the right of self-determination, advocated by U.S. President Woodrow Wilson reappointed Vio as major and expanded its ranks to some 60 co-opted members. In the meanwhile the National Council of Slovenes, Croats and Serbs was officially instituted on 29 October 1918 in Zagreb. Representatives of the latter body arrived in the city and wrested command of the governor palace from Jekelfalussy who left the city. The city now had two self-proclaimed governments, each basing its claims on the same principle. The local representatives of the Municipal Council as a response formed immediately the Italian National Council, headed by Antonio Grossich. On 30 October the body proclaimed the annexation of Fiume to Italy

=== Italian occupation of Fiume in 1918 ===
Austria-Hungary reached an armistice with Italy through the Armistice of Villa Giusti signed on November 3, 1918. This agreement stipulated that Italy could occupy large parts of the territory claimed by the State of Slovenes, Croats and Serbs, formed during the dissolution of the Habsburg Monarchy. The National Council of the Slovenes, Croats and Serbs in Fiume was dissolved when Italian Army units, commanded by General Enrico di San Marzano, occupied the city. The rule of the Italian National Council was tolerated by the Italian command, much less so by the American, English and French units who also came to the city.

=== Unification with Italy ===
At the Paris peace Conference Andrea Ossoinack was entrusted by the Italian National Council as its official representative and in that capacity had a meeting with Wilson in April 1919. The Italian National Council functioned as a de facto government (with interruptions) during both the Italian Regency of Carnaro (1919–1920) and the Free State of Fiume (1920–1924). The city was annexed to Italy in February 1924, thereby ending its authority.

== See also ==
- History of Rijeka
- List of governors and heads of state of Fiume
- History of Yugoslavia
- Timeline of Croatian history
