= Kriva Reka (Gornji Milanovac) =

Kriva Reka Крива Река
- Village
- Location within Serbia
- Coordinates: 44°07′15″N 20°23′47″E
- Country: Serbia
- District: Moravica District
- Municipality: Gornji Milanovac

Population (2002)
  - Total: 102
- Time zone: UTC+1 (CET)
  - Summer (DST): UTC+2 (CEST)

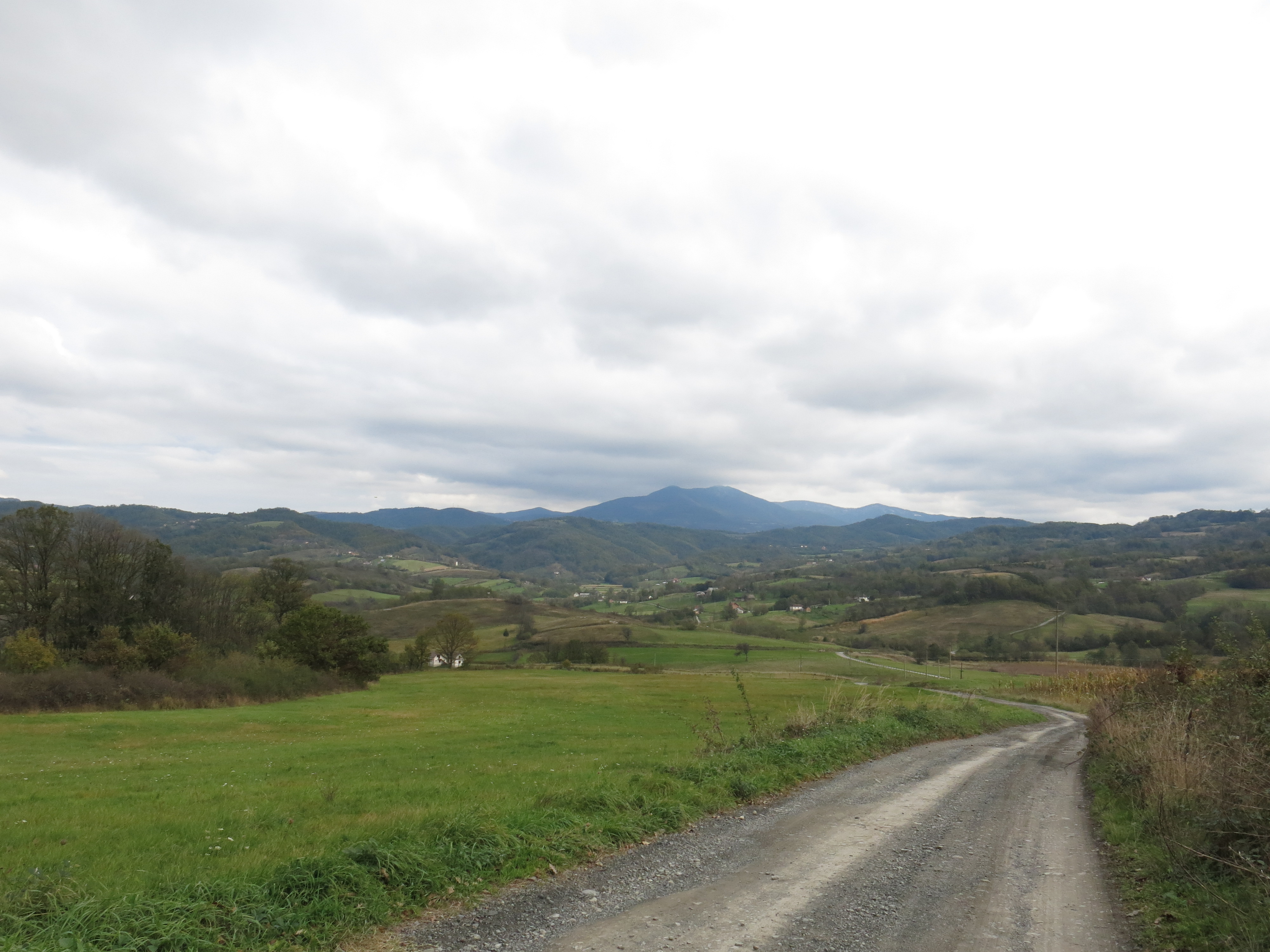
Kriva Reka

Kriva Reka is a village in the municipality of Gornji Milanovac, Serbia. According to the 2002 census, the village has a population of 102 people.
