= Reka =

Reka may refer to:

== Populated places ==
- Řeka, a village in the Czech Republic
- Reka, Cerkno, a village near Cerkno, Slovenia
- Reka, Laško, a village near Laško, Slovenia
- Reka (Kladovo), a village near Kladovo, Serbia
- Reka, Koprivnica, a village near Koprivnica, Croatia
- Slovene name for Rijeka, a city in northwestern Croatia
- Reka (region), a region in Macedonia, North Macedonia
  - Upper Reka, a subregion in Macedonia, North Macedonia
  - Lower Reka, a subregion in Macedonia, North Macedonia
- Reka (Metohija), a region in Metohija, Kosovo
- Pusta Reka (region), earlier only Reka, a region in Leskovac Valley, Serbia

== Other uses ==
- Réka, a given name in Hungary
- James Reka, Australian street artist
- Reka (river), a river in Slovenia and Italy
- Reka dialect, of Macedonian
- The River (1933 film) (Czech: Řeka), a 1933 Czechoslovak film
- Upper Reka dialect of Albanian
- Kan Reka, an Israeli radio station
  - Its predecessor, Reka (radio station)
