= Free State of Fiume =

1920–1924 coastal city-state in modern Croatia

Coordinates: 45.3531°N 14.4429°E

Free State of Fiume Stato libero di Fiume (Italian) Fiumei Szabadállam (Hungarian) Freistaat Fiume (German) Slobodna Država Rijeka (Croatian)
- 1920–1924
- Flag Coat of arms

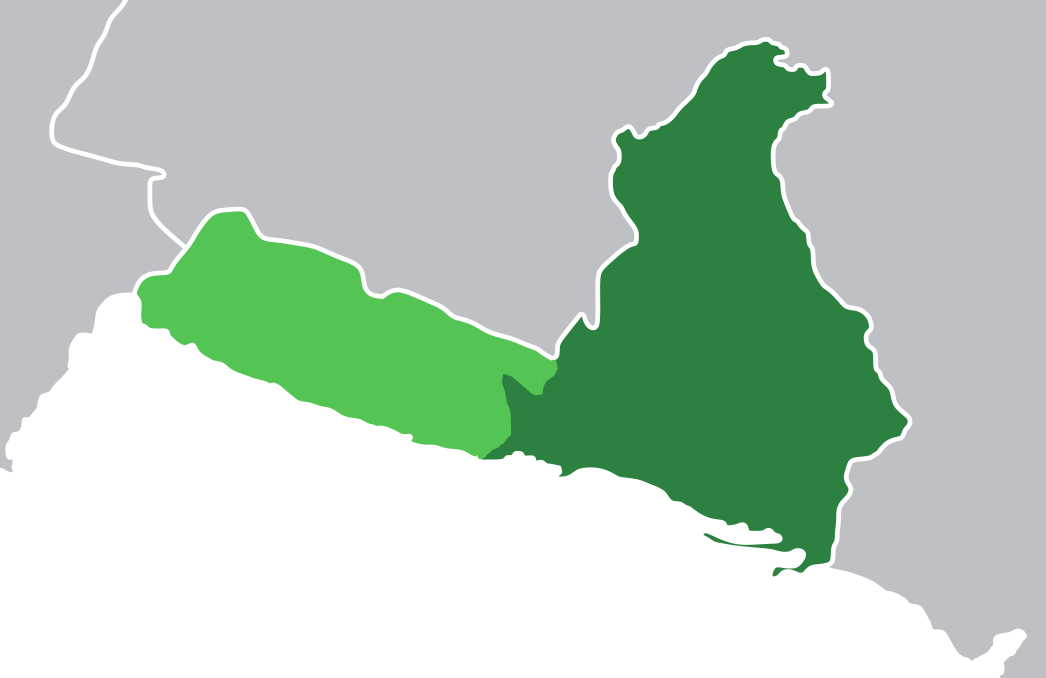
- Map of the Free State of Fiume (original Hungarian district of Fiume in dark green)
- Capital: Fiume (Rijeka)
- Common languages: Official; Italian · Hungarian · German Regional; Venetian · Chakavian Croatian
- Demonyms: Fiumean, Rijekan
- Government: Parliamentary republic
- President
  - 1921–22: Riccardo Zanella
  - 1922–23: Giovanni Giuriati
- Military Governor
  - 1923–24: Gaetano Giardino
- Historical era: Interwar period
  - Treaty of Rapallo: 12 November 1920
  - Control established: 30 December 1920
  - Coup d'état: 3 March 1922
  - Annexed by the Kingdom of Italy: 22 February 1924

Area
  - Total: 28 km^{2} (11 sq mi)
- Currency: Fiume krone (until 1920); Italian lira (after 1920)
Preceded by	Succeeded by
Italian Regency of Carnaro	Province of Fiume
- Today part of: Croatia

The Free State of Fiume (pronounced [ˈfjuːme]), also called the Free State of Rijeka [rijěːka], was an independent free state that existed from 1920 to 1924. Its territory of 28 km^{2} (6,900 acres) comprised the city of Fiume (today Rijeka, Croatia) and rural areas to its north, with a corridor to its west connecting it to the Kingdom of Italy.

Fiume gained autonomy for the first time in 1719, when it was proclaimed a free port of the Holy Roman Empire in a decree issued by Emperor Charles VI. In 1776, during the reign of Empress Maria Theresa, the city was transferred to the Kingdom of Hungary and gained the status of corpus separatum within Hungary in 1779.

The city briefly lost its autonomy in 1848 after being occupied by Croatian ban (viceroy) Josip Jelačić but regained it in 1868, when it rejoined the Kingdom of Hungary, again as a corpus separatum. Fiume's status as an exclave of Hungary meant that, despite being landlocked, the kingdom had a port. Until 1924, Fiume existed for practical purposes as an autonomous entity with elements of statehood.

In the 19th century, the city was populated mostly by Italians, with minorities of Croats, Hungarians, and other ethnicities. National affiliations changed from census to census, as at that time "nationality" was defined mostly by the language a person spoke. The special status of the city, being placed between different states, created a local identity among the majority of the population. The official languages in use were Italian, Hungarian, and German; most business correspondence was carried out in Italian, and most families spoke a local dialect, a blend of Venetian with a few words of Croatian. In the countryside outside the city, a particular kind of Croatian Chakavian dialect with many Italian and Venetian words was spoken.

== Politics ==
After World War I and the demise of Austria-Hungary, the question of the status of Fiume became a major international problem. At the height of the dispute between the Kingdom of Serbs, Croats, and Slovenes (later called Kingdom of Yugoslavia) and the Kingdom of Italy, the Great Powers (the United Kingdom, France and the United States) advocated for the establishment of an independent buffer state. U.S. President Woodrow Wilson became the arbiter in the Yugoslav–Italian dispute over the city. Wilson suggested that Fiume be set up as an independent state and, indeed, as a potential home for the League of Nations organization.

The dispute led to lawlessness, and the city changed hands between a South-Slav National Committee and an Italian National Council, leading finally to the landing of British and French troops, who took over the city. The National Council overstamped Austro-Hungarian notes – the Fiume Kronen – which were used as official currency. The chaotic situation was exploited by Italian poet and general Gabriele D'Annunzio, who entered the city on 12 September 1919 and began a 15-month occupation. A year later, after failed negotiations with the Italian government, D'Annunzio proclaimed the Italian Regency of Carnaro.

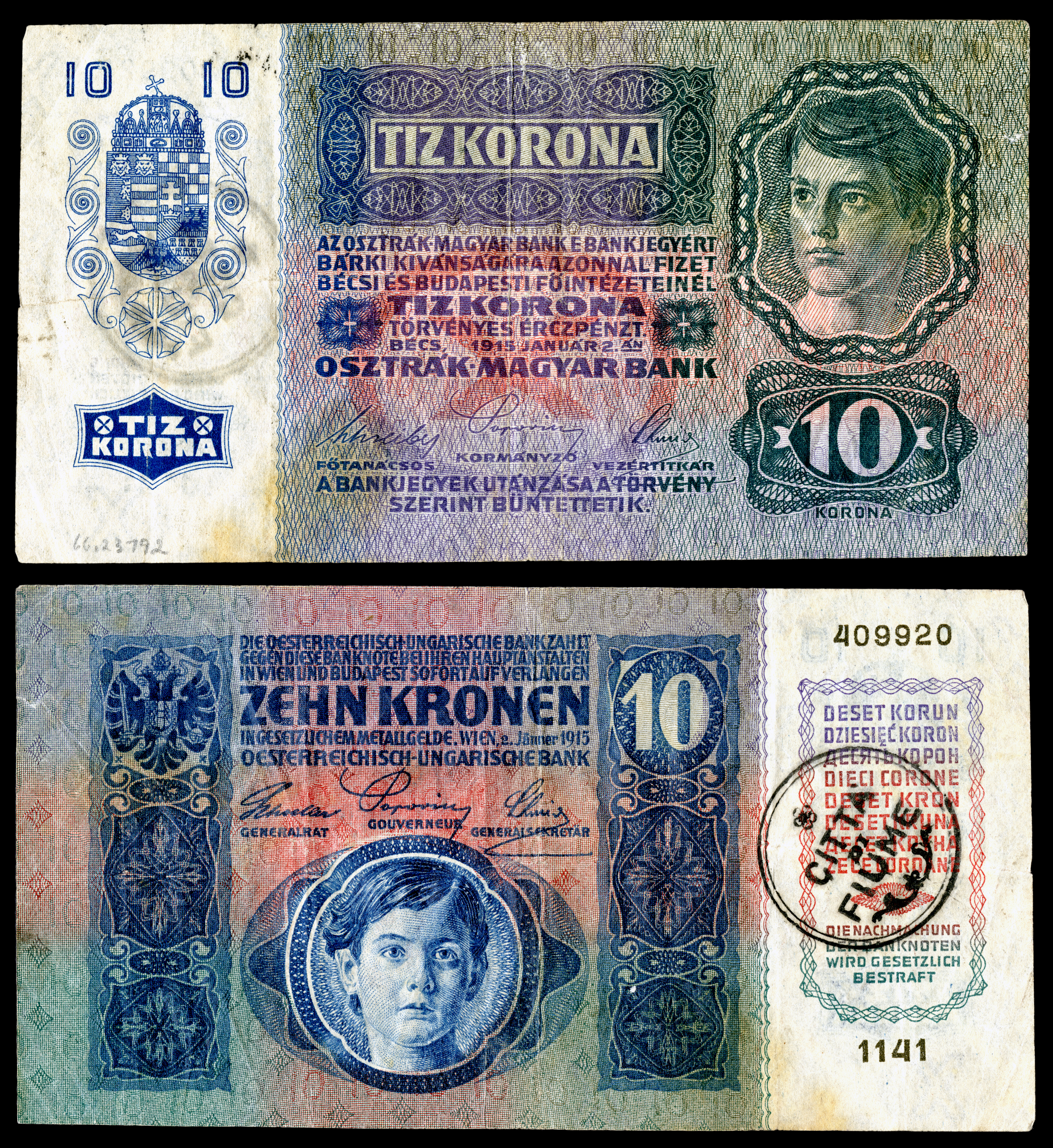
10 Fiume krone provisional banknote (1920)

On 12 November 1920, the Kingdom of Italy and the Kingdom of Serbs, Croats, and Slovenes signed the Treaty of Rapallo, whereby both parties agreed to acknowledge "the complete freedom and independence of the State of Fiume and oblige to respect it in perpetuity". With that act, the eternal "Free State of Fiume" was created, which, as it turned out, would exist as an independent state for about four years. The newly created state was immediately recognized by the United States, France, and the United Kingdom. D'Annunzio refused to acknowledge the agreement and was expelled from the city by the regular forces of the Italian Army, in the "Bloody Christmas" actions from 24 to 30 December 1920.

Control over the Free State was in an almost constant state of flux. Following the departure of D'Annunzio's troops in December 1920, the Italian National Council of Fiume reassumed control and appointed a provisional government. A pact with the local Italian commander handed control to the military on 18 January 1921.

In April 1921, the electorate approved a plan for a free state and for a consortium to run the port. As a parliamentary republic, the first parliamentary elections were held, contested between the autonomists and the pro-Italian National Bloc. The Autonomist Party, which was supported by the majority of Croats, gained 6,558 votes; the National Bloc, composed of Fascist, Liberal, and Democratic parties, received 3,443 votes. The leader of the Autonomist Party, Riccardo Zanella, became president.

A group of D'Annunzio loyalists seized part of the town until they were in turn pushed out in September. In October, autonomist Riccardo Zanella was appointed provisional president; his rule lasted until 3 March 1922, when Italian Fascists carried out a coup d'état and the internationally recognized government escaped to Kraljevica. On 6 March, the Italian government was asked to restore order, and Italian troops entered the city on 17 March. They returned control to the minority of the constituent assembly who were loyal to the Italian annexationists.

After the proclamation of the Rapallo Treaty, the Communist Party of Fiume (Italian: Partito Comunista di Fiume – Sezione della III.a Internazionale) was instituted in November 1921. The Communist Party of Fiume was the smallest Communist Party in the world. It was founded following the principles of the Third International, according to which each sovereign state had to have its own Communist Party organization.

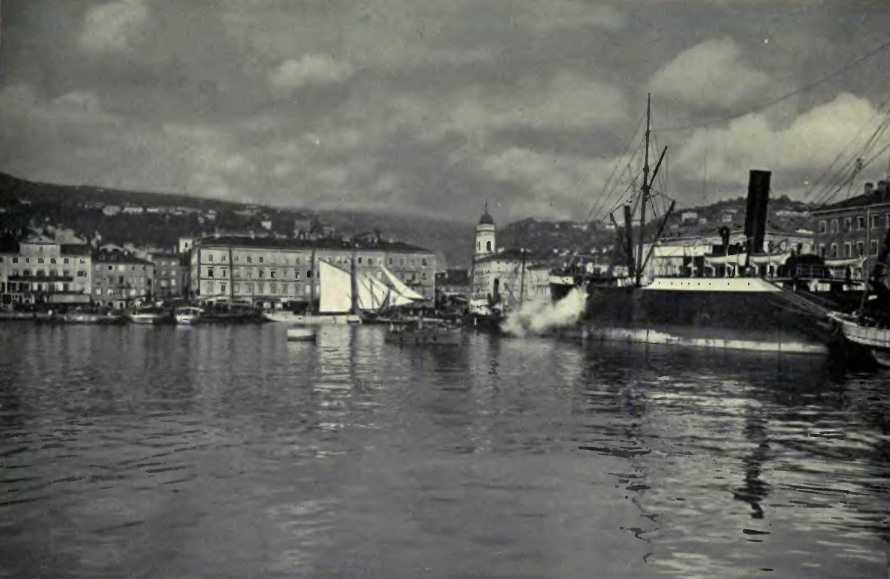
Fiume harbour in 1923

On 27 January 1924, the Kingdom of Italy and the Kingdom of Serbs, Croats, and Slovenes signed the Treaty of Rome, agreeing to the annexation of Fiume by Italy and the absorption of Sušak by the Kingdom of Serbs, Croats, and Slovenes. All parties ratified the agreement in Rome on 22 February 1924, and it became effective the same day. It was registered in the League of Nations Treaty Series on 7 April 1924. The government-in-exile of the Free State considered the act invalid and nonbinding under international law and continued its activities until well after the 1950s. In the aftermath of the Second World War, Zanella and Tito were still discussing the possibility of reinstating the old free state, but changes in the international geopolitical picture led the Yugoslav Communist regime to seize the opportunity and annex the city in 1947 after two years of occupation, aided by Stalin's strong support during the Paris peace conference.

== Aftermath ==
With the surrender of Italy in the Second World War, the "Rijeka" issue resurfaced. In 1944, a group of citizens issued the Liburnia Memorandum, in which it was recommended that a confederate state be formed from the three cantons of Fiume, Sušak, and Ilirska Bistrica. The islands of Krk (Veglia), Cres (Cherso), and Lošinj (Lussino) would enter the common condominium (a government operating under joint rule) as well. Zanella of the government-in-exile still sought reestablishment of the Free State.

The Yugoslav authorities, who took possession of the city from German occupation on 3 May 1945, objected to the plans and took concrete steps to settle the dispute. The leaders of the autonomists – Nevio Skull, Mario Blasich, and Sergio Sincich – were murdered, and Zanella went into hiding. With the Paris Peace Treaty of 1947, Fiume (now called Rijeka) and Istria officially became part of Yugoslavia.

== See also ==
- Italian Regency of Carnaro
- Charter of Carnaro
- Province of Fiume
- List of governors and heads of state of Fiume
- Postage stamps and postal history of Fiume
- TIGR
- Free Territory of Trieste
- Gabriele D'Annunzio
- Free City of Danzig

Region	until 1918	1918– 1929	1929– 1945	1941– 1945	1945– 1946	1946– 1963	1963– 1992	1992– 2003	2003– 2006	2006– 2008	since 2008
Slovenia	Part of Austria-Hungary including the Bay of Kotor See also: Kingdom of Croatia-Slavonia (1868–1918) Kingdom of Dalmatia (1815–1918) Condominium of Bosnia and Herzegovina (1878–1918)	State of Slovenes, Croats and Serbs (1918) Kingdom of Serbs, Croats and Slovenes (1918–1929) Kingdom of Yugoslavia (1929–1943) See also: Republic of Prekmurje (1919) Banat, Bačka and Baranja (1918–1919) Free State of Fiume (1920–1924) (1924–1945) Italian province of Zadar (1920–1947)		Annexed by Italy, Germany, and Hungary^{a}	Democratic Federal Yugoslavia (1943–1945) Federal People's Republic of Yugoslavia (1945–1963) Socialist Federal Republic of Yugoslavia (1963–1992) Consisted of the Socialist Republics of: Slovenia (1945–1991); Croatia (1945–1991); Bosnia and Herzegovina (1945–1992) Serbia (1945–1992) (included the autonomous provinces of Vojvodina and Kosovo) Montenegro (1945–1992); Macedonia (1945–1991) See also: Free Territory of Trieste (1947–1954)^{h}			Republic of Slovenia; Ten-Day War			
Dalmatia	Part of Austria-Hungary including the Bay of Kotor See also: Kingdom of Croatia-Slavonia (1868–1918) Kingdom of Dalmatia (1815–1918) Condominium of Bosnia and Herzegovina (1878–1918)	State of Slovenes, Croats and Serbs (1918) Kingdom of Serbs, Croats and Slovenes (1918–1929) Kingdom of Yugoslavia (1929–1943) See also: Republic of Prekmurje (1919) Banat, Bačka and Baranja (1918–1919) Free State of Fiume (1920–1924) (1924–1945) Italian province of Zadar (1920–1947)		Independent State of Croatia (1941–1945) Puppet state of Germany. Parts annexed by Italy. Međimurje and Baranja annexed by Hungary.	Democratic Federal Yugoslavia (1943–1945) Federal People's Republic of Yugoslavia (1945–1963) Socialist Federal Republic of Yugoslavia (1963–1992) Consisted of the Socialist Republics of: Slovenia (1945–1991); Croatia (1945–1991); Bosnia and Herzegovina (1945–1992) Serbia (1945–1992) (included the autonomous provinces of Vojvodina and Kosovo) Montenegro (1945–1992); Macedonia (1945–1991) See also: Free Territory of Trieste (1947–1954)^{h}			Republic of Croatia^{b} Croatian War of Independence			
Slavonia	Part of Austria-Hungary including the Bay of Kotor See also: Kingdom of Croatia-Slavonia (1868–1918) Kingdom of Dalmatia (1815–1918) Condominium of Bosnia and Herzegovina (1878–1918)	State of Slovenes, Croats and Serbs (1918) Kingdom of Serbs, Croats and Slovenes (1918–1929) Kingdom of Yugoslavia (1929–1943) See also: Republic of Prekmurje (1919) Banat, Bačka and Baranja (1918–1919) Free State of Fiume (1920–1924) (1924–1945) Italian province of Zadar (1920–1947)		Independent State of Croatia (1941–1945) Puppet state of Germany. Parts annexed by Italy. Međimurje and Baranja annexed by Hungary.	Democratic Federal Yugoslavia (1943–1945) Federal People's Republic of Yugoslavia (1945–1963) Socialist Federal Republic of Yugoslavia (1963–1992) Consisted of the Socialist Republics of: Slovenia (1945–1991); Croatia (1945–1991); Bosnia and Herzegovina (1945–1992) Serbia (1945–1992) (included the autonomous provinces of Vojvodina and Kosovo) Montenegro (1945–1992); Macedonia (1945–1991) See also: Free Territory of Trieste (1947–1954)^{h}			Republic of Croatia^{b} Croatian War of Independence			
Croatia	Part of Austria-Hungary including the Bay of Kotor See also: Kingdom of Croatia-Slavonia (1868–1918) Kingdom of Dalmatia (1815–1918) Condominium of Bosnia and Herzegovina (1878–1918)	State of Slovenes, Croats and Serbs (1918) Kingdom of Serbs, Croats and Slovenes (1918–1929) Kingdom of Yugoslavia (1929–1943) See also: Republic of Prekmurje (1919) Banat, Bačka and Baranja (1918–1919) Free State of Fiume (1920–1924) (1924–1945) Italian province of Zadar (1920–1947)		Independent State of Croatia (1941–1945) Puppet state of Germany. Parts annexed by Italy. Međimurje and Baranja annexed by Hungary.	Democratic Federal Yugoslavia (1943–1945) Federal People's Republic of Yugoslavia (1945–1963) Socialist Federal Republic of Yugoslavia (1963–1992) Consisted of the Socialist Republics of: Slovenia (1945–1991); Croatia (1945–1991); Bosnia and Herzegovina (1945–1992) Serbia (1945–1992) (included the autonomous provinces of Vojvodina and Kosovo) Montenegro (1945–1992); Macedonia (1945–1991) See also: Free Territory of Trieste (1947–1954)^{h}			Republic of Croatia^{b} Croatian War of Independence			
Bosnia	Part of Austria-Hungary including the Bay of Kotor See also: Kingdom of Croatia-Slavonia (1868–1918) Kingdom of Dalmatia (1815–1918) Condominium of Bosnia and Herzegovina (1878–1918)	State of Slovenes, Croats and Serbs (1918) Kingdom of Serbs, Croats and Slovenes (1918–1929) Kingdom of Yugoslavia (1929–1943) See also: Republic of Prekmurje (1919) Banat, Bačka and Baranja (1918–1919) Free State of Fiume (1920–1924) (1924–1945) Italian province of Zadar (1920–1947)		Independent State of Croatia (1941–1945) Puppet state of Germany. Parts annexed by Italy. Međimurje and Baranja annexed by Hungary.	Democratic Federal Yugoslavia (1943–1945) Federal People's Republic of Yugoslavia (1945–1963) Socialist Federal Republic of Yugoslavia (1963–1992) Consisted of the Socialist Republics of: Slovenia (1945–1991); Croatia (1945–1991); Bosnia and Herzegovina (1945–1992) Serbia (1945–1992) (included the autonomous provinces of Vojvodina and Kosovo) Montenegro (1945–1992); Macedonia (1945–1991) See also: Free Territory of Trieste (1947–1954)^{h}			Bosnia and Herzegovina^{c} Bosnian War Consists of the Federation of Bosnia and Herzegovina (since 1995), Republika Srpska (since 1995), and Brčko District (since 2000).			
Herzegovina	Part of Austria-Hungary including the Bay of Kotor See also: Kingdom of Croatia-Slavonia (1868–1918) Kingdom of Dalmatia (1815–1918) Condominium of Bosnia and Herzegovina (1878–1918)	State of Slovenes, Croats and Serbs (1918) Kingdom of Serbs, Croats and Slovenes (1918–1929) Kingdom of Yugoslavia (1929–1943) See also: Republic of Prekmurje (1919) Banat, Bačka and Baranja (1918–1919) Free State of Fiume (1920–1924) (1924–1945) Italian province of Zadar (1920–1947)		Independent State of Croatia (1941–1945) Puppet state of Germany. Parts annexed by Italy. Međimurje and Baranja annexed by Hungary.	Democratic Federal Yugoslavia (1943–1945) Federal People's Republic of Yugoslavia (1945–1963) Socialist Federal Republic of Yugoslavia (1963–1992) Consisted of the Socialist Republics of: Slovenia (1945–1991); Croatia (1945–1991); Bosnia and Herzegovina (1945–1992) Serbia (1945–1992) (included the autonomous provinces of Vojvodina and Kosovo) Montenegro (1945–1992); Macedonia (1945–1991) See also: Free Territory of Trieste (1947–1954)^{h}			Bosnia and Herzegovina^{c} Bosnian War Consists of the Federation of Bosnia and Herzegovina (since 1995), Republika Srpska (since 1995), and Brčko District (since 2000).			
Vojvodina	Part of the Délvidék region of Hungary	State of Slovenes, Croats and Serbs (1918) Kingdom of Serbs, Croats and Slovenes (1918–1929) Kingdom of Yugoslavia (1929–1943) See also: Republic of Prekmurje (1919) Banat, Bačka and Baranja (1918–1919) Free State of Fiume (1920–1924) (1924–1945) Italian province of Zadar (1920–1947)		Autonomous Banat^{d} (part of the German; Territory of the Military Commander in Serbia)	Democratic Federal Yugoslavia (1943–1945) Federal People's Republic of Yugoslavia (1945–1963) Socialist Federal Republic of Yugoslavia (1963–1992) Consisted of the Socialist Republics of: Slovenia (1945–1991); Croatia (1945–1991); Bosnia and Herzegovina (1945–1992) Serbia (1945–1992) (included the autonomous provinces of Vojvodina and Kosovo) Montenegro (1945–1992); Macedonia (1945–1991) See also: Free Territory of Trieste (1947–1954)^{h}			Federal Republic of Yugoslavia Consisted of the Republic of Serbia (1992–2006) and Republic of Montenegro (1992–2006) Included Kosovo and Metohija, under UN administration, without control since 1999	State Union of Serbia and Montenegro Included Kosovo, under UN administration	Republic of Serbia Included the autonomous provinces of Vojvodina and Kosovo and Metohija under UN administration	Republic of Serbia Includes the autonomous province of Vojvodina; Kosovo claim
Central Serbia	Kingdom of Serbia (1882–1918)	State of Slovenes, Croats and Serbs (1918) Kingdom of Serbs, Croats and Slovenes (1918–1929) Kingdom of Yugoslavia (1929–1943) See also: Republic of Prekmurje (1919) Banat, Bačka and Baranja (1918–1919) Free State of Fiume (1920–1924) (1924–1945) Italian province of Zadar (1920–1947)		Territory of the Military Commander in Serbia (1941–1944) ^{e}	Democratic Federal Yugoslavia (1943–1945) Federal People's Republic of Yugoslavia (1945–1963) Socialist Federal Republic of Yugoslavia (1963–1992) Consisted of the Socialist Republics of: Slovenia (1945–1991); Croatia (1945–1991); Bosnia and Herzegovina (1945–1992) Serbia (1945–1992) (included the autonomous provinces of Vojvodina and Kosovo) Montenegro (1945–1992); Macedonia (1945–1991) See also: Free Territory of Trieste (1947–1954)^{h}			Federal Republic of Yugoslavia Consisted of the Republic of Serbia (1992–2006) and Republic of Montenegro (1992–2006) Included Kosovo and Metohija, under UN administration, without control since 1999	State Union of Serbia and Montenegro Included Kosovo, under UN administration	Republic of Serbia Included the autonomous provinces of Vojvodina and Kosovo and Metohija under UN administration	Republic of Serbia Includes the autonomous province of Vojvodina; Kosovo claim
Kosovo	Part of the Kingdom of Serbia (1912–1918)	State of Slovenes, Croats and Serbs (1918) Kingdom of Serbs, Croats and Slovenes (1918–1929) Kingdom of Yugoslavia (1929–1943) See also: Republic of Prekmurje (1919) Banat, Bačka and Baranja (1918–1919) Free State of Fiume (1920–1924) (1924–1945) Italian province of Zadar (1920–1947)		Mostly annexed by Italian Albania (1941–1944) along with western Macedonia and south-eastern Montenegro	Democratic Federal Yugoslavia (1943–1945) Federal People's Republic of Yugoslavia (1945–1963) Socialist Federal Republic of Yugoslavia (1963–1992) Consisted of the Socialist Republics of: Slovenia (1945–1991); Croatia (1945–1991); Bosnia and Herzegovina (1945–1992) Serbia (1945–1992) (included the autonomous provinces of Vojvodina and Kosovo) Montenegro (1945–1992); Macedonia (1945–1991) See also: Free Territory of Trieste (1947–1954)^{h}			Federal Republic of Yugoslavia Consisted of the Republic of Serbia (1992–2006) and Republic of Montenegro (1992–2006) Included Kosovo and Metohija, under UN administration, without control since 1999	State Union of Serbia and Montenegro Included Kosovo, under UN administration	Republic of Serbia Included the autonomous provinces of Vojvodina and Kosovo and Metohija under UN administration	Republic of Kosovo
Metohija	Kingdom of Montenegro (1910–1918) Metohija controlled by Austria-Hungary 1915–1918	State of Slovenes, Croats and Serbs (1918) Kingdom of Serbs, Croats and Slovenes (1918–1929) Kingdom of Yugoslavia (1929–1943) See also: Republic of Prekmurje (1919) Banat, Bačka and Baranja (1918–1919) Free State of Fiume (1920–1924) (1924–1945) Italian province of Zadar (1920–1947)		Mostly annexed by Italian Albania (1941–1944) along with western Macedonia and south-eastern Montenegro	Democratic Federal Yugoslavia (1943–1945) Federal People's Republic of Yugoslavia (1945–1963) Socialist Federal Republic of Yugoslavia (1963–1992) Consisted of the Socialist Republics of: Slovenia (1945–1991); Croatia (1945–1991); Bosnia and Herzegovina (1945–1992) Serbia (1945–1992) (included the autonomous provinces of Vojvodina and Kosovo) Montenegro (1945–1992); Macedonia (1945–1991) See also: Free Territory of Trieste (1947–1954)^{h}			Federal Republic of Yugoslavia Consisted of the Republic of Serbia (1992–2006) and Republic of Montenegro (1992–2006) Included Kosovo and Metohija, under UN administration, without control since 1999	State Union of Serbia and Montenegro Included Kosovo, under UN administration	Republic of Serbia Included the autonomous provinces of Vojvodina and Kosovo and Metohija under UN administration	Republic of Kosovo
Montenegro and Brda	Kingdom of Montenegro (1910–1918) Metohija controlled by Austria-Hungary 1915–1918	State of Slovenes, Croats and Serbs (1918) Kingdom of Serbs, Croats and Slovenes (1918–1929) Kingdom of Yugoslavia (1929–1943) See also: Republic of Prekmurje (1919) Banat, Bačka and Baranja (1918–1919) Free State of Fiume (1920–1924) (1924–1945) Italian province of Zadar (1920–1947)		Protectorate of Montenegro^{f} (1941–1944)	Democratic Federal Yugoslavia (1943–1945) Federal People's Republic of Yugoslavia (1945–1963) Socialist Federal Republic of Yugoslavia (1963–1992) Consisted of the Socialist Republics of: Slovenia (1945–1991); Croatia (1945–1991); Bosnia and Herzegovina (1945–1992) Serbia (1945–1992) (included the autonomous provinces of Vojvodina and Kosovo) Montenegro (1945–1992); Macedonia (1945–1991) See also: Free Territory of Trieste (1947–1954)^{h}			Federal Republic of Yugoslavia Consisted of the Republic of Serbia (1992–2006) and Republic of Montenegro (1992–2006) Included Kosovo and Metohija, under UN administration, without control since 1999	State Union of Serbia and Montenegro Included Kosovo, under UN administration	Montenegro	
Vardar Macedonia	Part of the Kingdom of Serbia (1912–1918)	State of Slovenes, Croats and Serbs (1918) Kingdom of Serbs, Croats and Slovenes (1918–1929) Kingdom of Yugoslavia (1929–1943) See also: Republic of Prekmurje (1919) Banat, Bačka and Baranja (1918–1919) Free State of Fiume (1920–1924) (1924–1945) Italian province of Zadar (1920–1947)		Annexed by the Kingdom of Bulgaria (1941–1944)	Democratic Federal Yugoslavia (1943–1945) Federal People's Republic of Yugoslavia (1945–1963) Socialist Federal Republic of Yugoslavia (1963–1992) Consisted of the Socialist Republics of: Slovenia (1945–1991); Croatia (1945–1991); Bosnia and Herzegovina (1945–1992) Serbia (1945–1992) (included the autonomous provinces of Vojvodina and Kosovo) Montenegro (1945–1992); Macedonia (1945–1991) See also: Free Territory of Trieste (1947–1954)^{h}			Republic of North Macedonia^{g}			
^{a} Prekmurje annexed by Hungary.; ^{b} See also: SAO Kninska Krajina (1990) → SAO Krajina (1990–1991); and SAO Eastern Slavonia, Baranja and Western Syrmia (1990–1991), SAO Western Slavonia (1990–1991) and the Republic of Serbian Krajina (1990–1995), all replaced by the UN Transitional Administration for Eastern Slavonia, Baranja and Western Sirmium (1996–1998).; ^{c} See also: Republic of Bosnia and Herzegovina; Croatian Republic of Herzeg-Bosnia; and the Serbian Autonomous Oblasts (SAOs) of Bosanska Krajina, North-East Bosnia, Romanija and Herzegovina (1991–1992), which all combined to form the Serbian Republic of Bosnia and Herzegovina (1992–1995).; ^{d} Bačka was reannexed by Hungary (1941–1944), while Syrmia was annexed by the Independent State of Croatia (1941–1944).; ^{e} Including North Kosovo. See also: Republic of Užice.; ^{f} Annexed by Italy (1941–1943) and Germany (1943–1944). Smaller part annexed by the Independent State of Croatia (1941–1944).; ^{g} North Macedonia's official and constitutional name was the Republic of Macedonia until 2019. It was known in the United Nations as the former Yugoslav Republic of Macedonia because of a naming dispute with Greece.; ^{h} Free Territory was established in 1947. Its administration was divided into two areas (Zone A) and (Zone B). Free Territory was de facto taken over by Italy and SFRY in 1954.
