= Mirogoj Cemetery =

Cemetery in the city of Zagreb

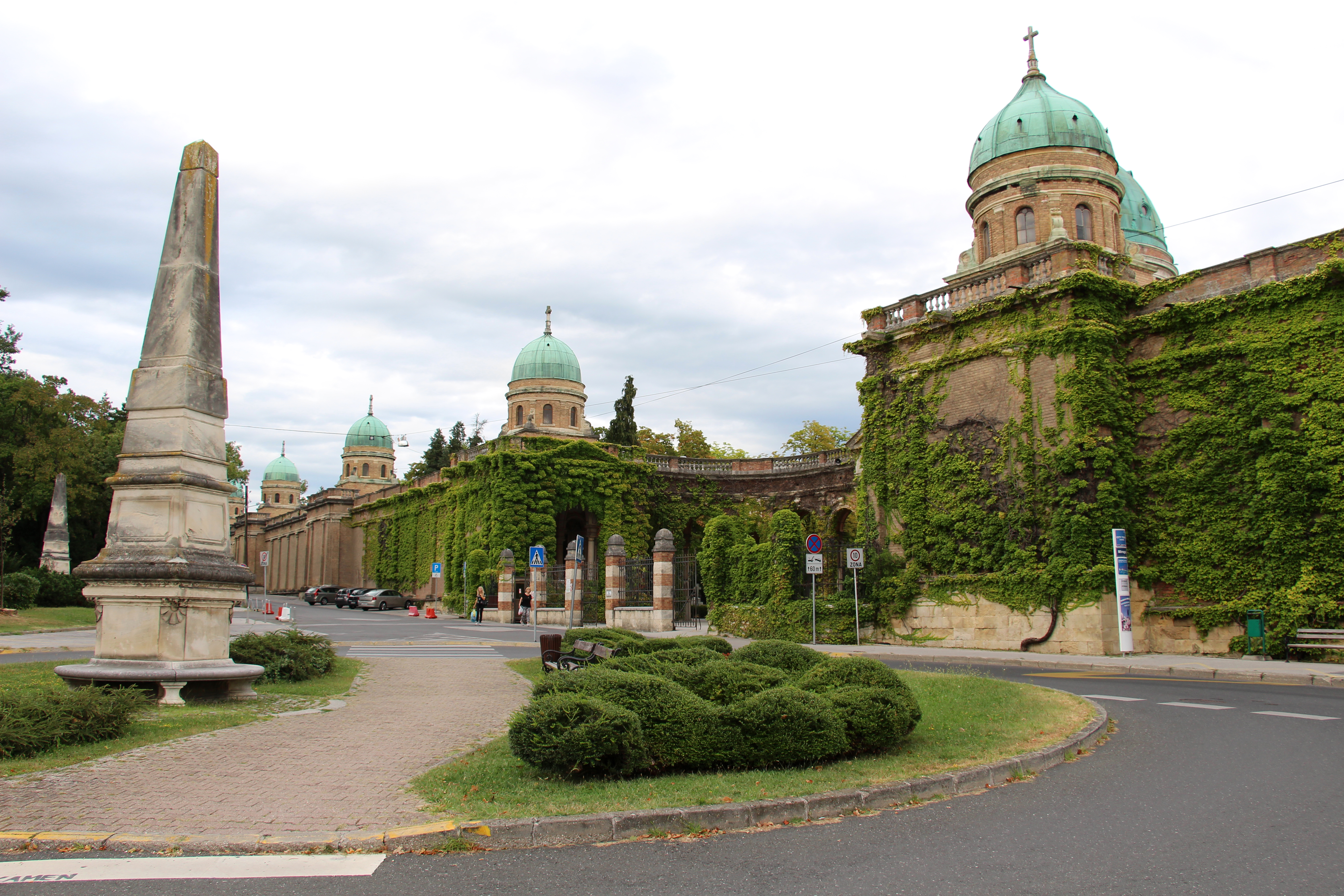
- Main entrance of Mirogoj
- Interactive map of Mirogoj Cemetery

Details
- Established: 6 November 1876
- Location: Gornji Grad–Medveščak, Zagreb
- Country: Croatia
- Coordinates: 45.835°N 15.986°E
- Type: Public
- Owned by: City of Zagreb
- No. of graves: 60,000
- No. of interments: 322,000
- Website: www.gradskagroblja.hr

The Mirogoj City Cemetery (pronounced [mîrɔɡɔːj], Croatian: Gradsko groblje Mirogoj), also known as Mirogoj Cemetery (Croatian: Groblje Mirogoj), is a cemetery park that is considered to be among the more noteworthy landmarks in the city of Zagreb. The cemetery inters members of all religious groups: Catholic, Orthodox, Muslim, Jewish, Protestant, Latter Day Saints; irreligious graves can all be found. In the arcades are the last resting places of many famous Croats. Mirogoj has 60,000 graves and it’s a resting place of 322,000 people.

== History ==
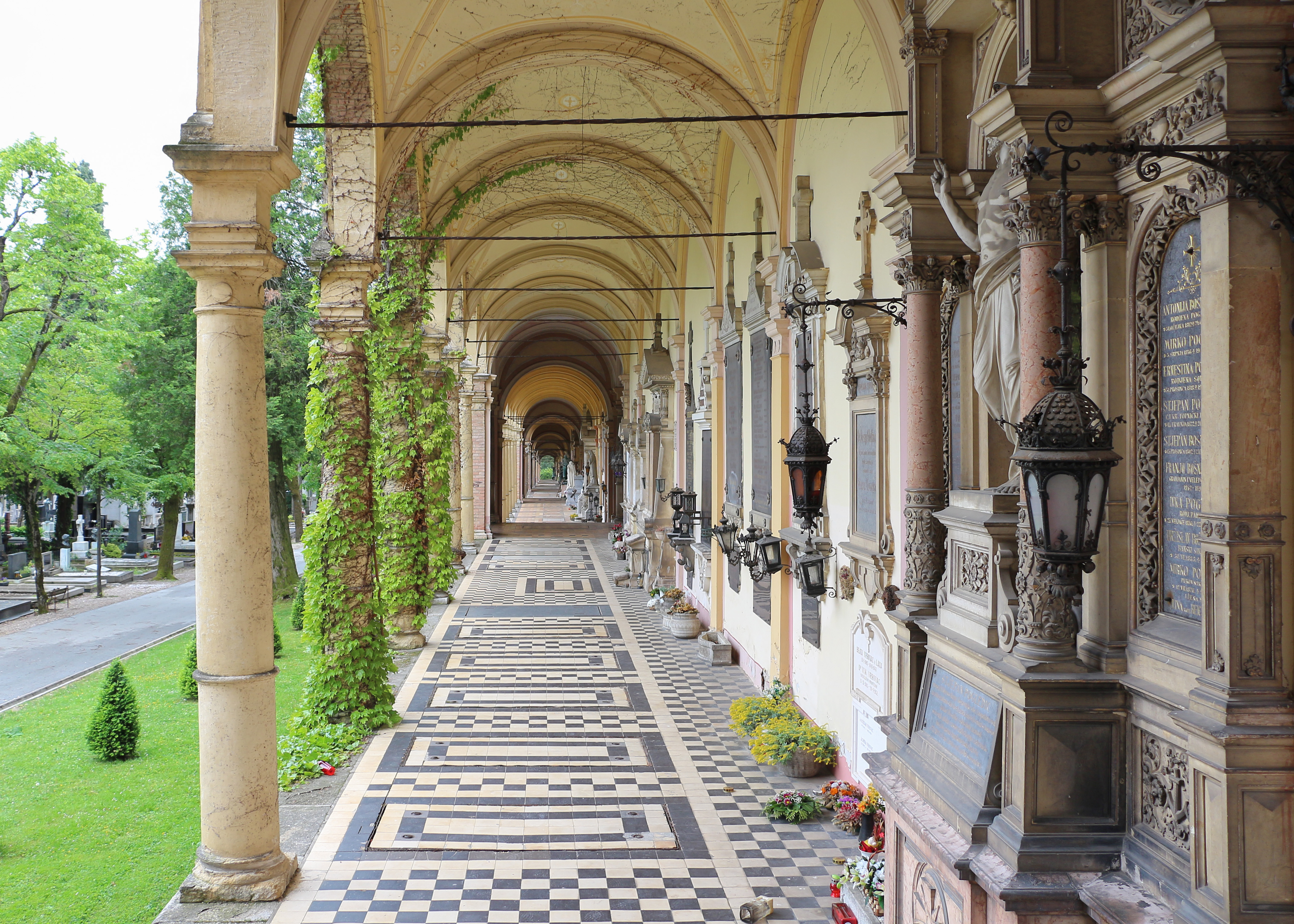
Mirogoj arcade

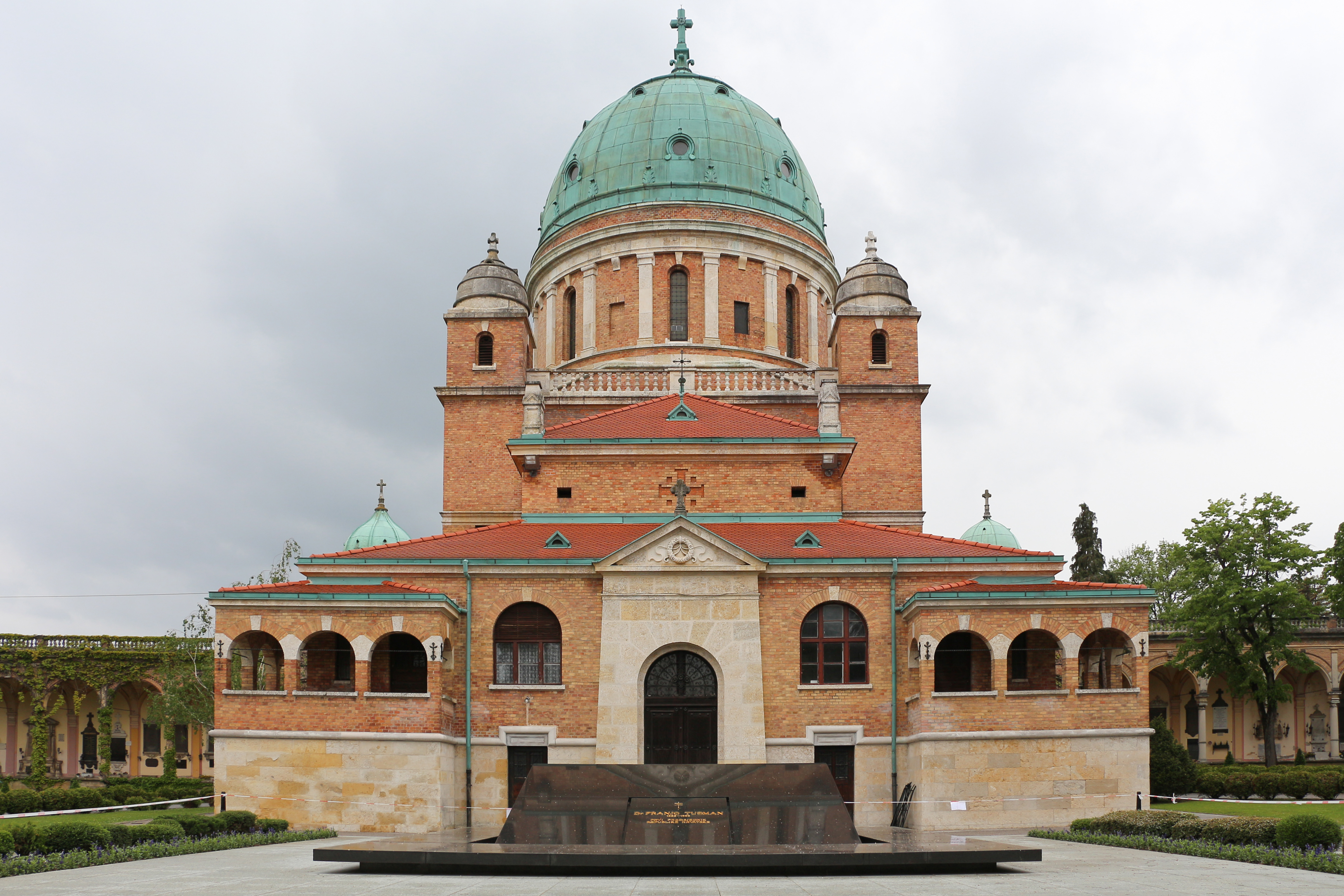
Christ the King Church from inside the cemetery

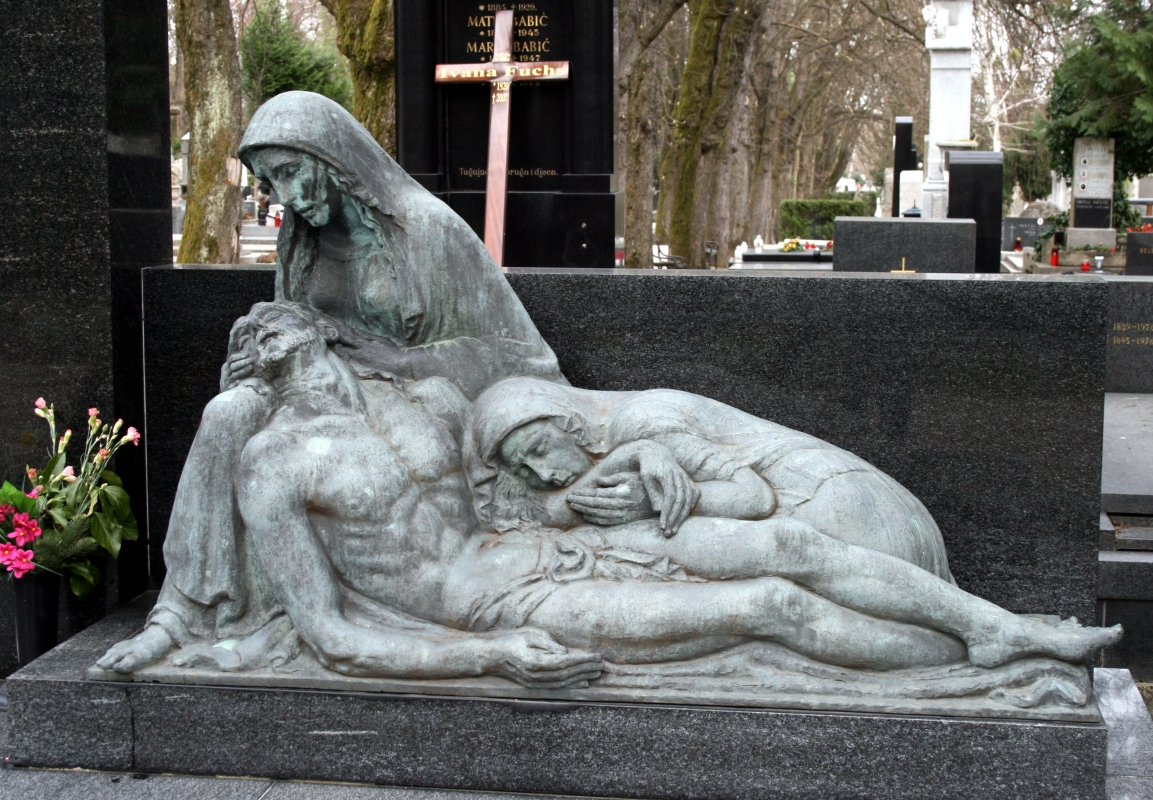
Pieta by Croatian sculptor Ivo Kerdić

The Mirogoj Cemetery was built on a plot of land owned by the linguist Ljudevit Gaj, purchased by the city in 1872, after his death. Architect Hermann Bollé designed the main building. The new cemetery was inaugurated on 6 November 1876.

The construction of the arcades, the cupolas, and the church in the entryway was begun in 1879. Due to lack of funding, work was finished only in 1929.

Unlike the older cemeteries in Zagreb, which were church-owned, Mirogoj was owned by the city, and accepted burials from all religious backgrounds.

On 22 March 2020, during the COVID-19 pandemic, Zagreb was hit by a 5.5 magnitude earthquake that caused significant damage across the city, including to the famous arcades of the Mirogoj cemetery.

== Notable interments ==
- Zlatko Baloković (1895–1965), violinist
- Milan Bandić (1955–2021), longest-serving mayor of Zagreb
- Ena Begović (1960–2000), actress
- Miroslav Blažević (1935–2023), football player and later manager
- Hermann Bollé (1845–1926), architect
- Ivana Brlić-Mažuranić (1874–1938), writer
- Ferdinand Budicki (1871–1951), automotive and air travel pioneer of Zagreb, introduced cars to the city
- Enver Čolaković (1913–1976), writer
- Krešimir Ćosić (1948–1995), basketball player and coach, member of both the Naismith Memorial Basketball Hall of Fame and FIBA Hall of Fame
- Tošo Dabac (1907–1970), photographer
- Arsen Dedić (1938–2015), singer-songwriter and composer
- Dimitrija Demeter (1811–1872), Greek–Croatian who played a major role in the movement for the national awakening of the Croatian nation
- Filip Deutsch (1828–1919), nobleman and industrialist
- Julio Deutsch (1859–1922), architect and co-owner of the architecture studio Hönigsberg & Deutsch
- Janko Drašković (1770–1856), nobleman, national reformer, politician and poet
- Rajko Dujmić, songwriter and composer (1954–2020)
- Hugo Ehrlich (1879–1936), architect
- Aleksandar Ehrmann (1879–1965), industrialist, philanthropist and diplomat
- Ljudevit Gaj (1809–1872), co-founder of the Illyrian movement
- Leo Hönigsberg (1861–1911), architect and co-owner of the architecture studio Hönigsberg & Deutsch
- Hosea Jacobi (1841–1925), Chief Rabbi of Zagreb
- Nevenka Košutić Brozović (1929 − 2013) art historian, literary critic, university professor, and translator
- Miroslav Krleža (1893–1981), writer
- Oton Kučera (1857–1931), astronomer
- Zinka Kunc-Milanov (1906–1989), famous soprano
- Svetozar Kurepa (1929–2010), mathematician
- Ante Kovačić (1854–1889), writer
- Vatroslav Lisinski (1819–1854), composer
- Vladko Maček (1879–1964), politician
- Savić Marković Štedimlija (1906–1971), publicist
- Anđelka Martić (1924–2000), writer
- Antun Gustav Matoš (1873–1914), writer
- Andrija Mohorovičić (1857–1936), seismologist
- Edo Murtić (1921–2005), painter
- Vladimir Nazor (1876–1949), writer
- Maximilian Njegovan (1858–1930), Commander-in-chief and admiral of the Austro-Hungarian Navy
- Slavoljub Eduard Penkala (1871–1922), inventor
- Dražen Petrović (1964–1993), basketball player, member of both the Naismith and FIBA Halls of Fame
- Milka Planinc (1924–2010), first and only female prime minister of Yugoslavia
- Vladimir Prelog (1906–1998), Nobel Prize-winning chemist
- Petar Preradović (1818–1872), poet
- Stjepan Radić (1871–1928), leader of the Croatian Peasants Party
- August Šenoa (1838–1881), writer
- Ivica Šerfezi (1935–2004), singer and politician supporter of Croatian Peasant Party
- Ivan Šubašić (1892–1955), last Ban of Croatia
- Milka Ternina (1863–1941), famous soprano
- Franjo Tuđman (1922–1999), the first president of Croatia
- Vice Vukov (1936–2008), singer and politician
- Tin Ujević (1891–1955), poet
- Emil Uzelac (1867–1954), head of the Austro-Hungarian air force
- Ivan Zajc (1832–1914), composer

== Memorials ==
- Monument to Fallen Croatian Soldiers in World War I (1919)
- Monument to the children from the Kozara mountain
- Tomb of the People's Heroes (1968)
- Memorial Cross to Croatian Home Guard Soldiers (1993)
- Monument to the Victims of Bleiburg and the Way of the Cross (1994)
- German military cemetery (1996) for more than 4.430 deaths
- Monument of the "Voice of Croatian Victims - Wall of Pain" (to Croatian victims of the Croatian War of Independence)

== Location and access ==
It is located today in the Gornji Grad–Medveščak city district, on Mirogojska road and Hermann Bollé street.

ZET bus line 106 runs between the cemetery and the Kaptol bus terminal in the heart of Zagreb every 20 minutes during the cemetery's opening hours. A less frequent line, 203 (every 20–25 minutes), also starts from Kaptol by the same route, but continues further east to Svetice terminal, directly connecting to the Maksimir Park. Also, the line 226 goes by a similar route as the line 203, but goes through Remete. Also, it’s less frequent (every 35-40 minutes).

== Gallery ==
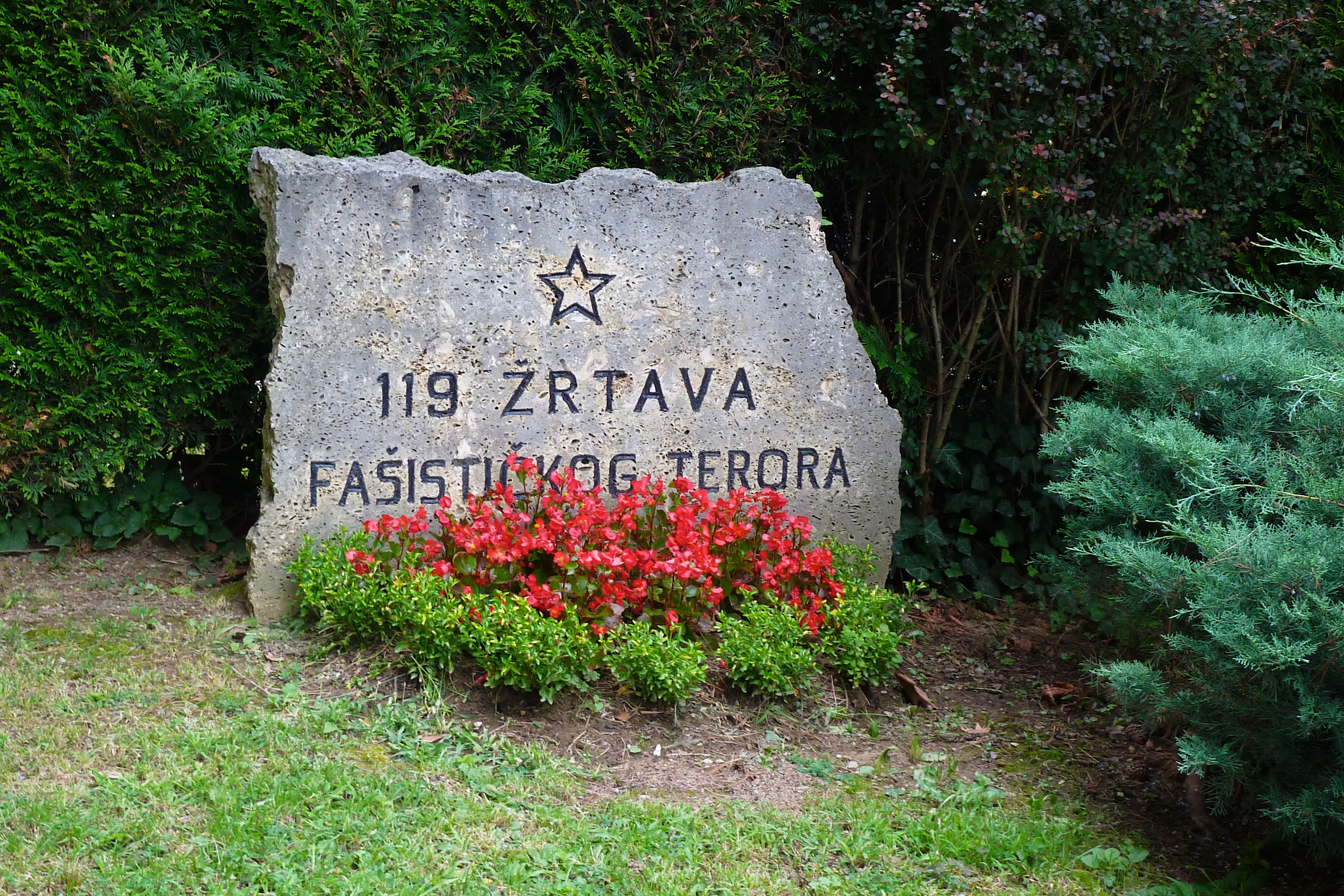
Monument to the 119 victims of fascist terror

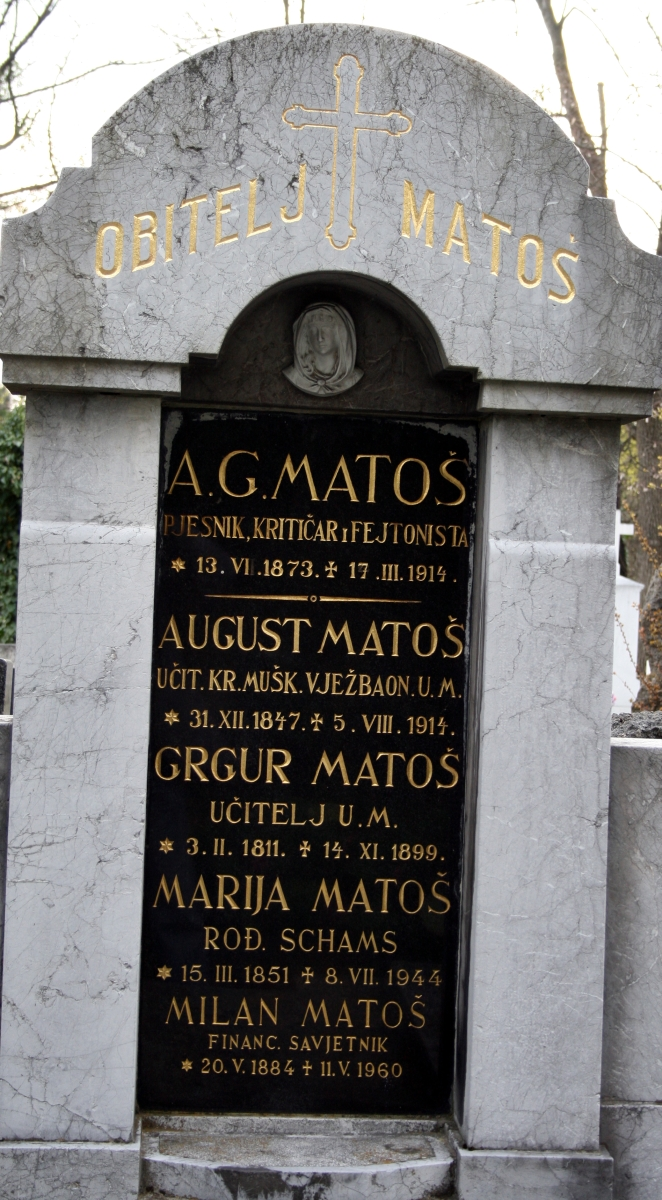
Antun Gustav Matoš's grave

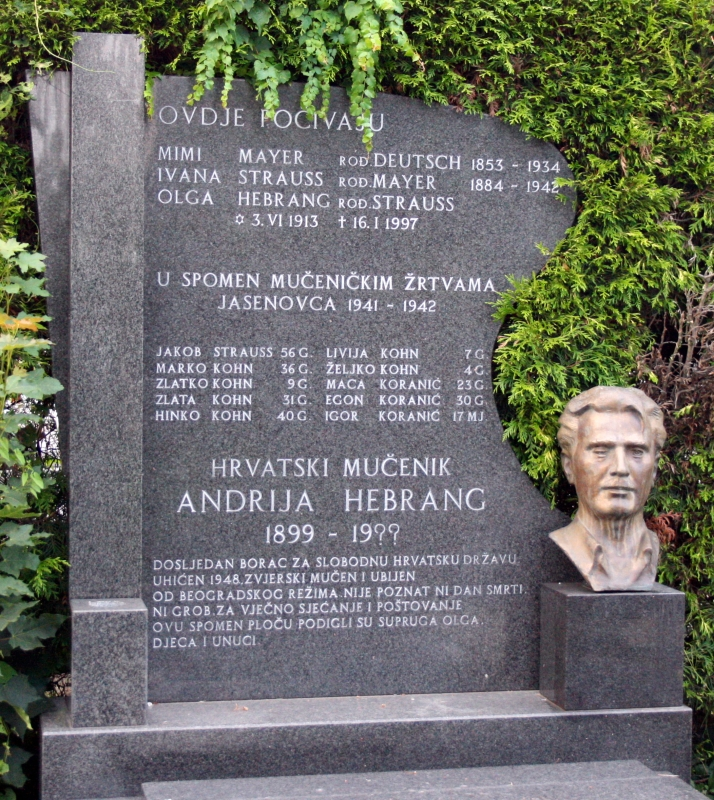
Andrija Hebrang's grave

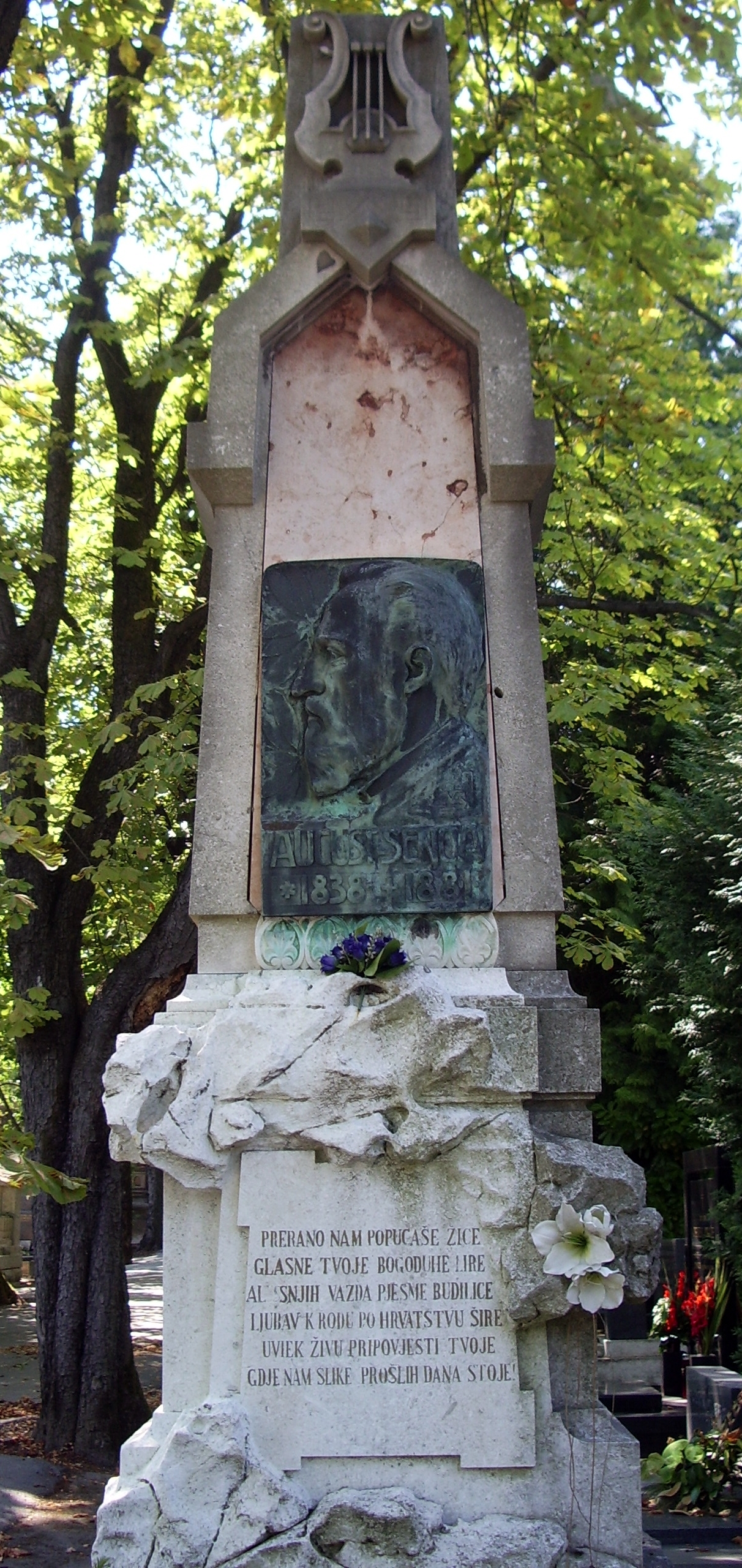
August Šenoa's grave monument

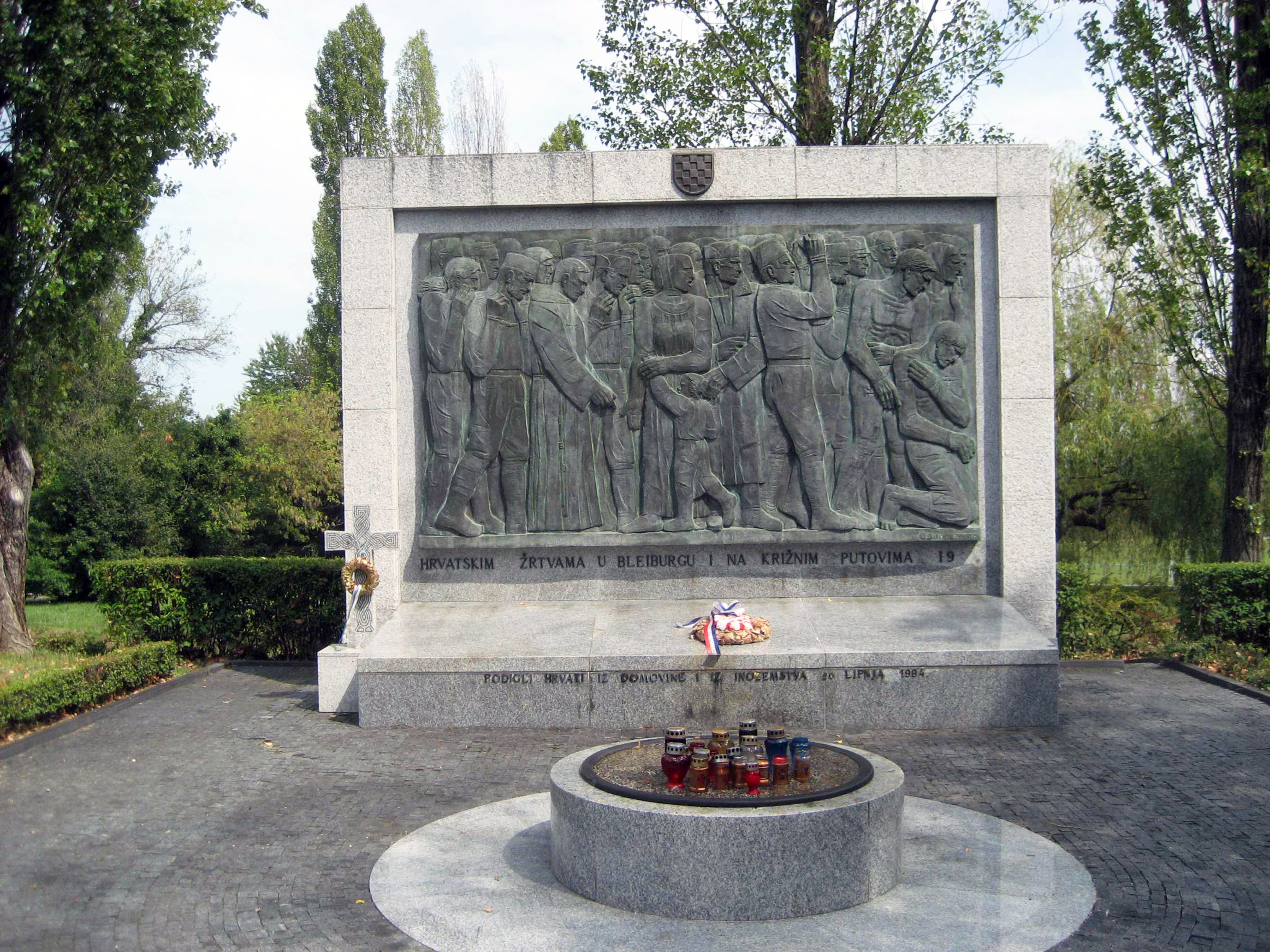
Memorial to the Yugoslav death march of Nazi collaborators

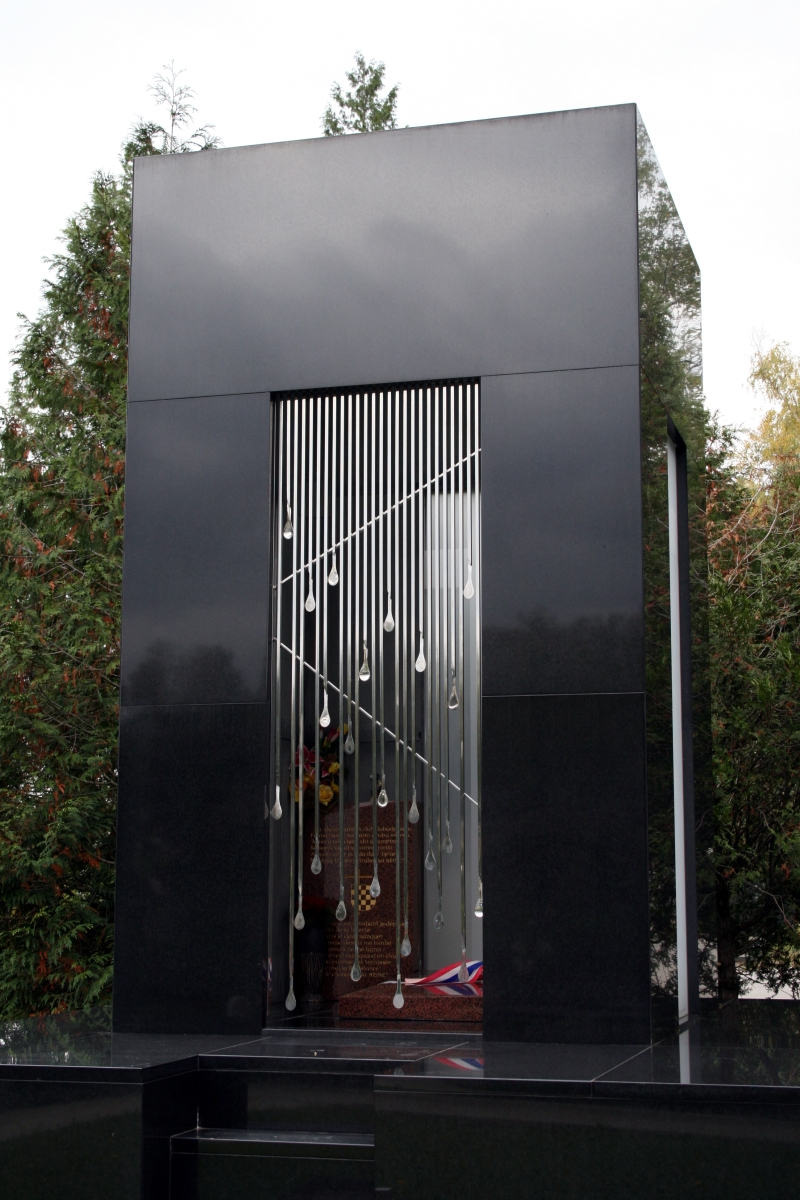
Bruno Bušić's grave

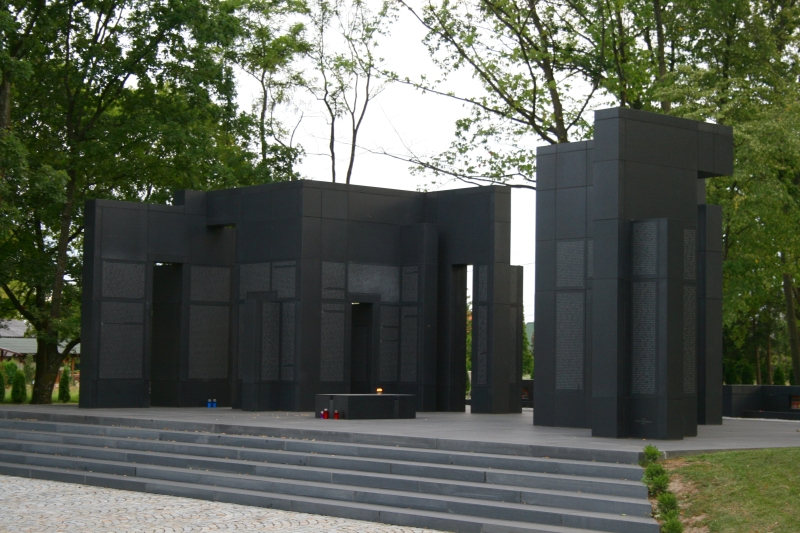
Monument to dead, missing and detained Croatian soldiers

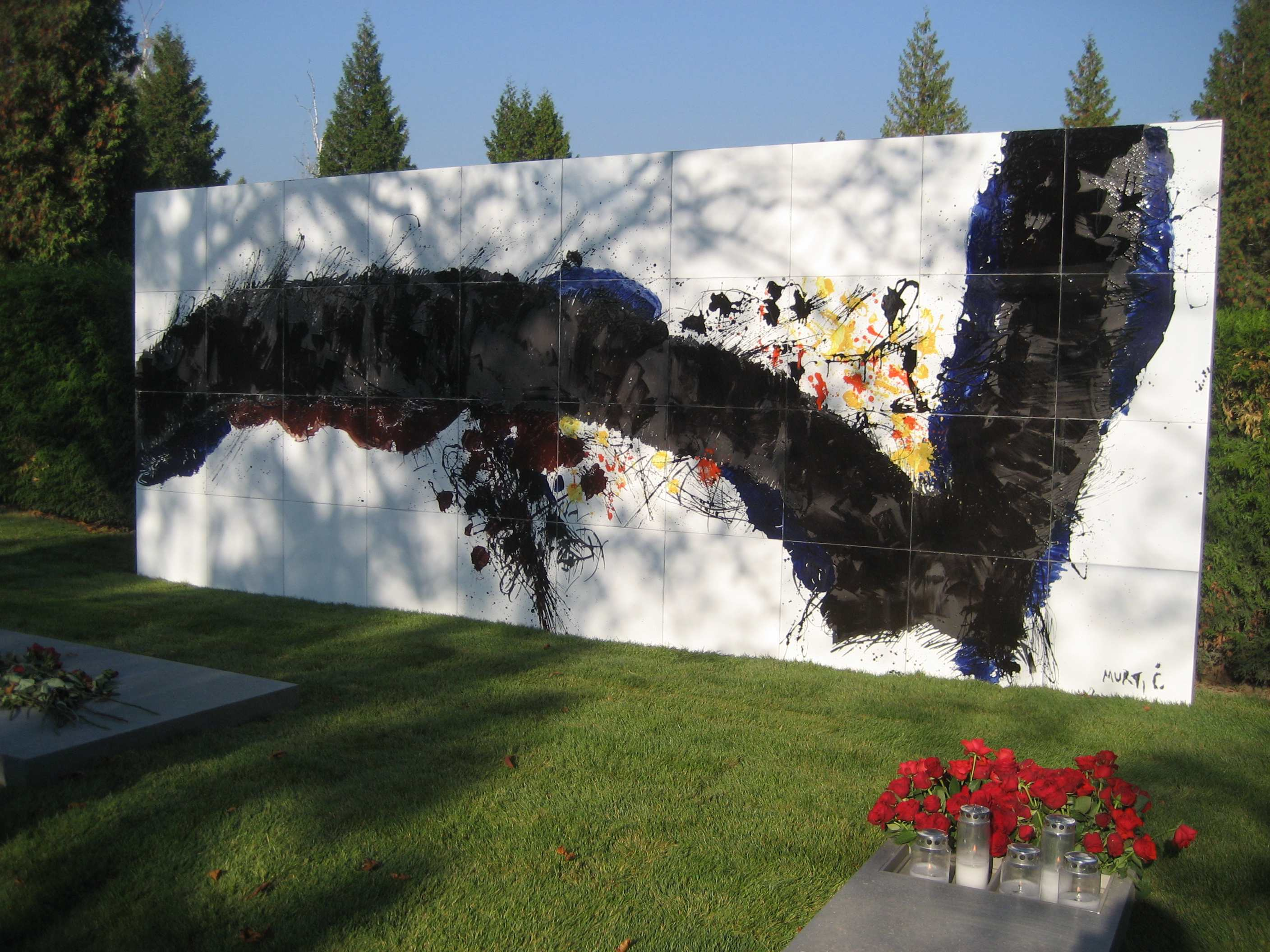
Monument near Edo Murtić's grave

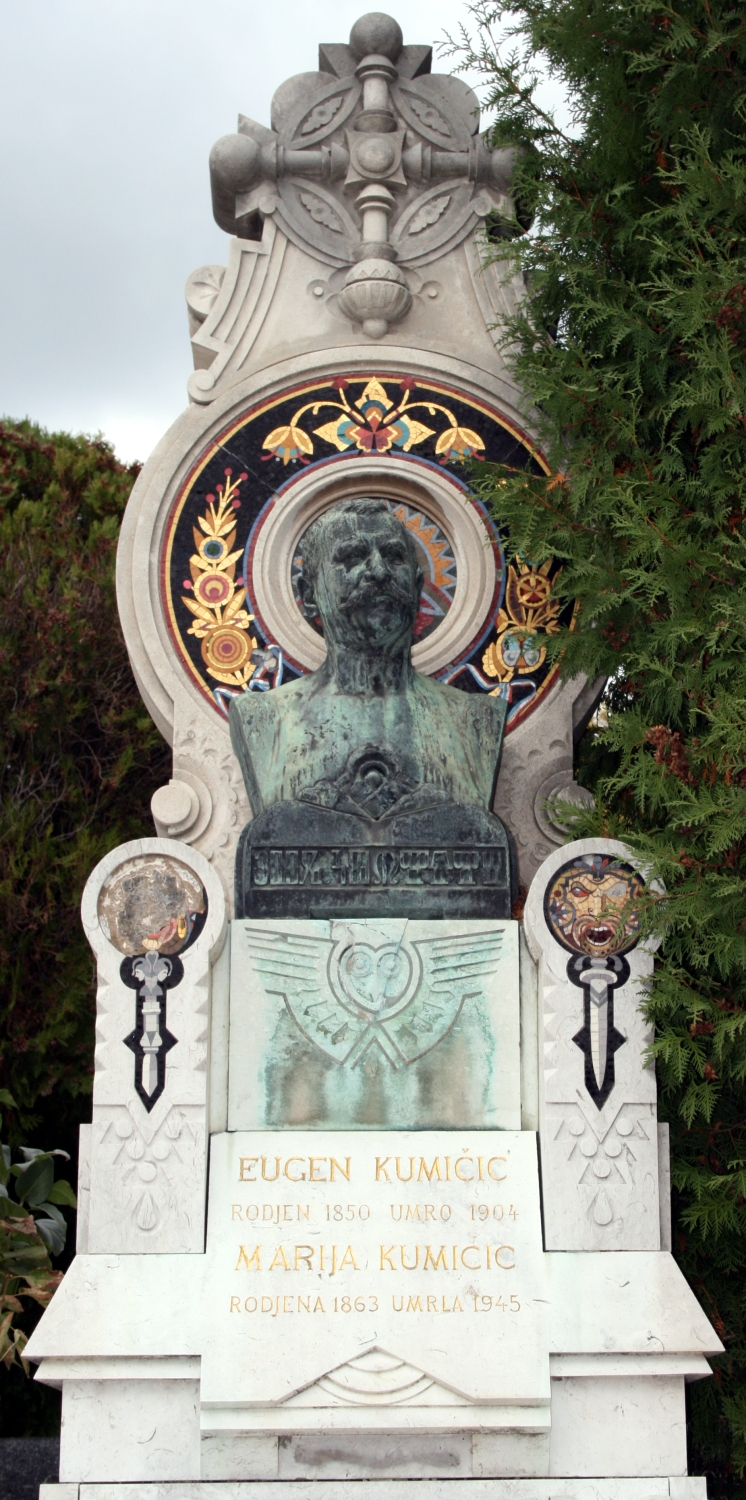
Eugen Kumičić's grave

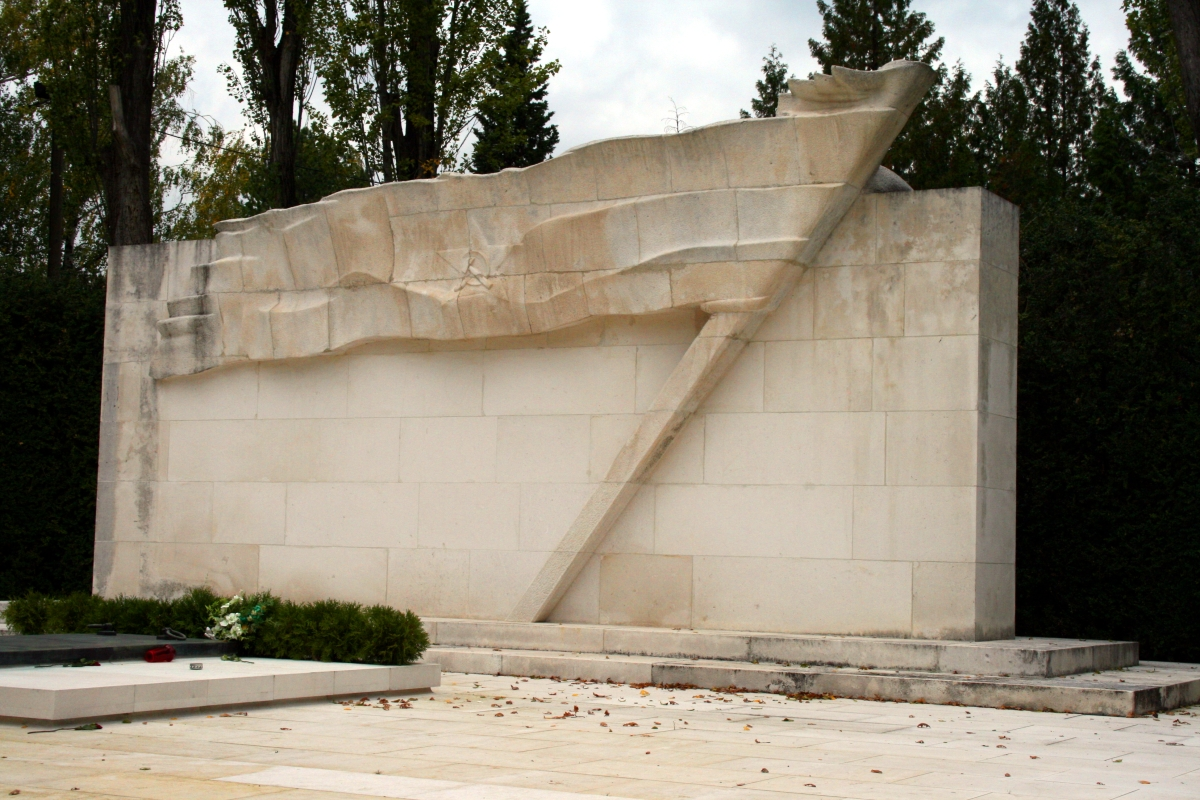
Tomb of the People's Heroes

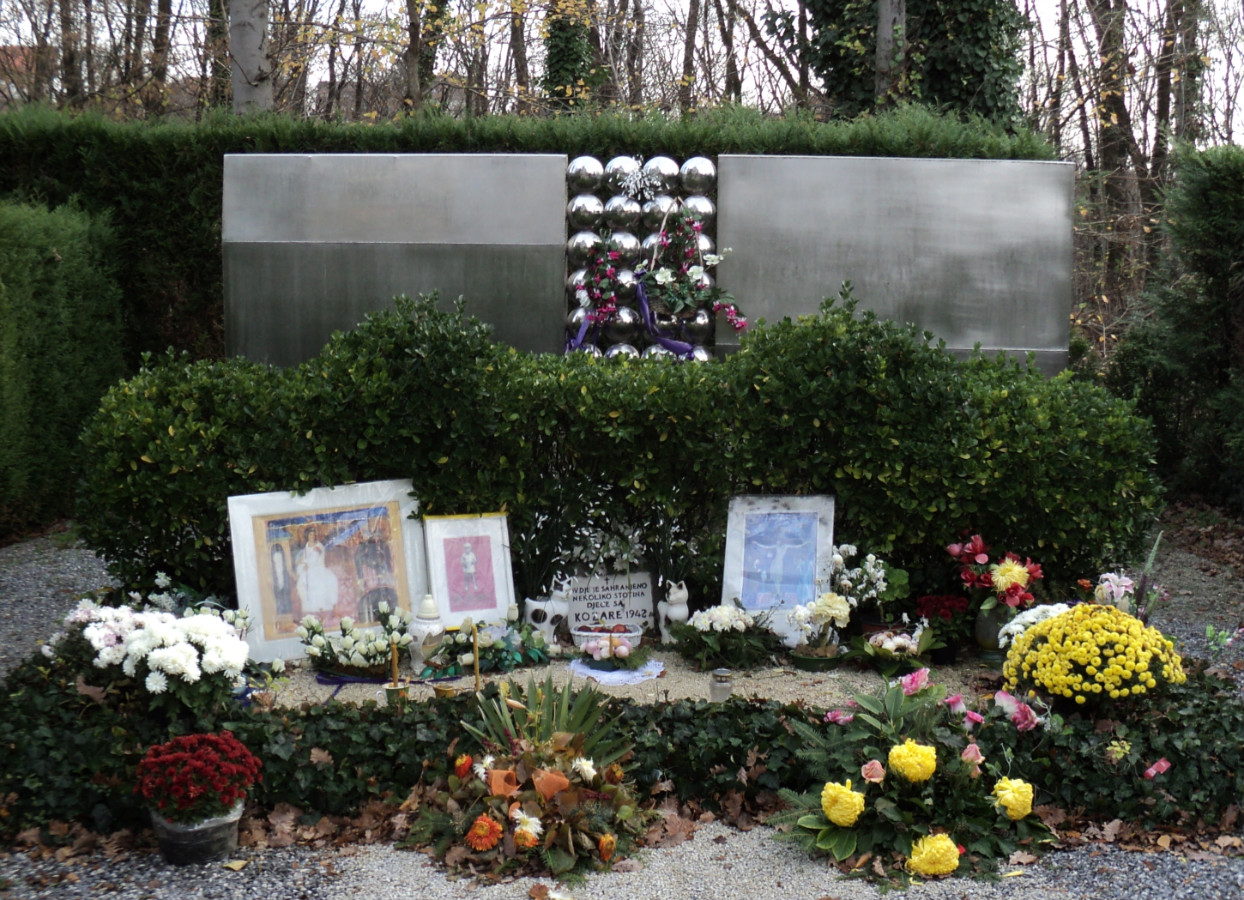
Monument to the children from Kozara; about 400 children who died in Ustaše concentration camps during World War II

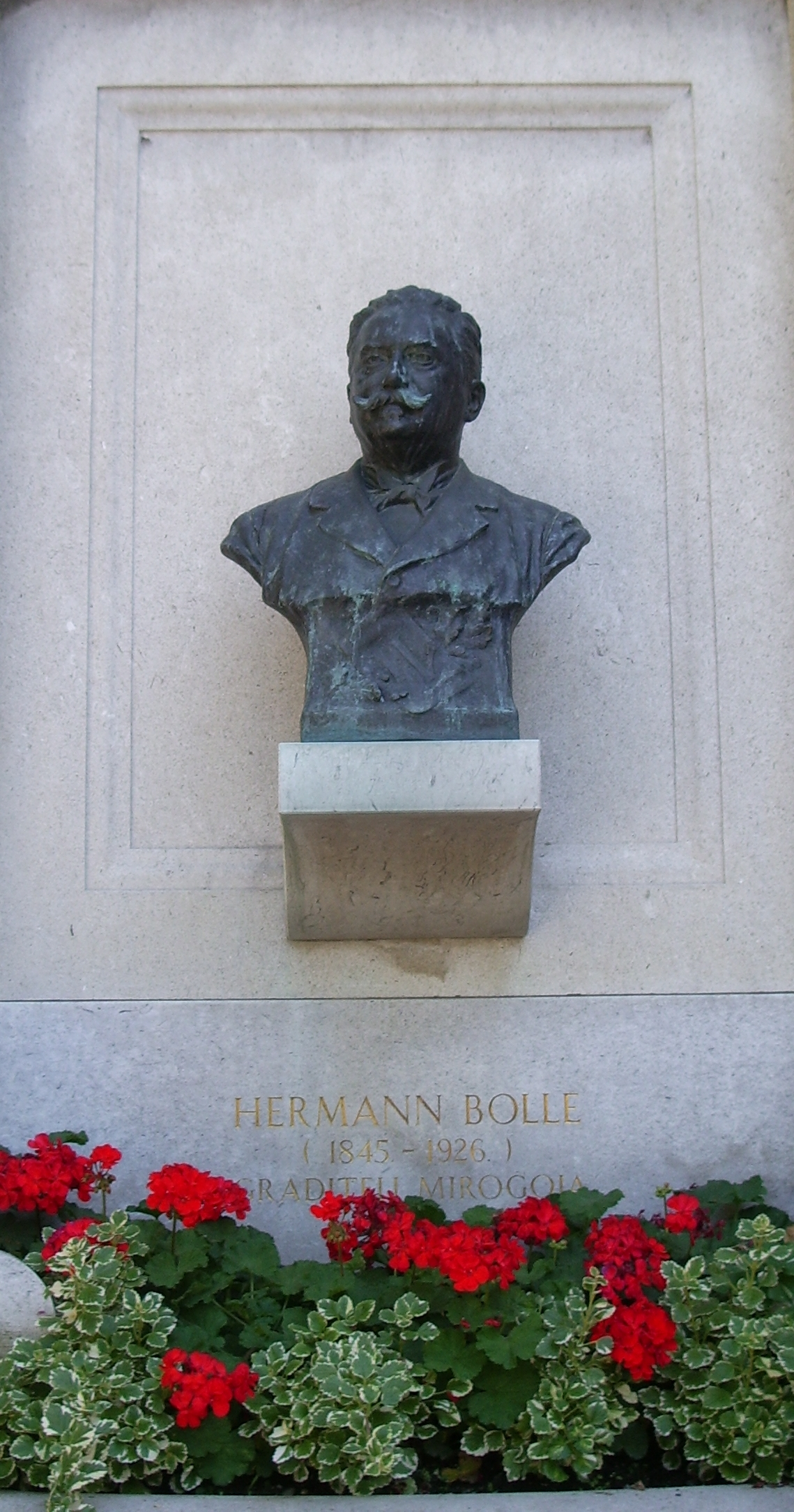
Hermann Bollé's grave

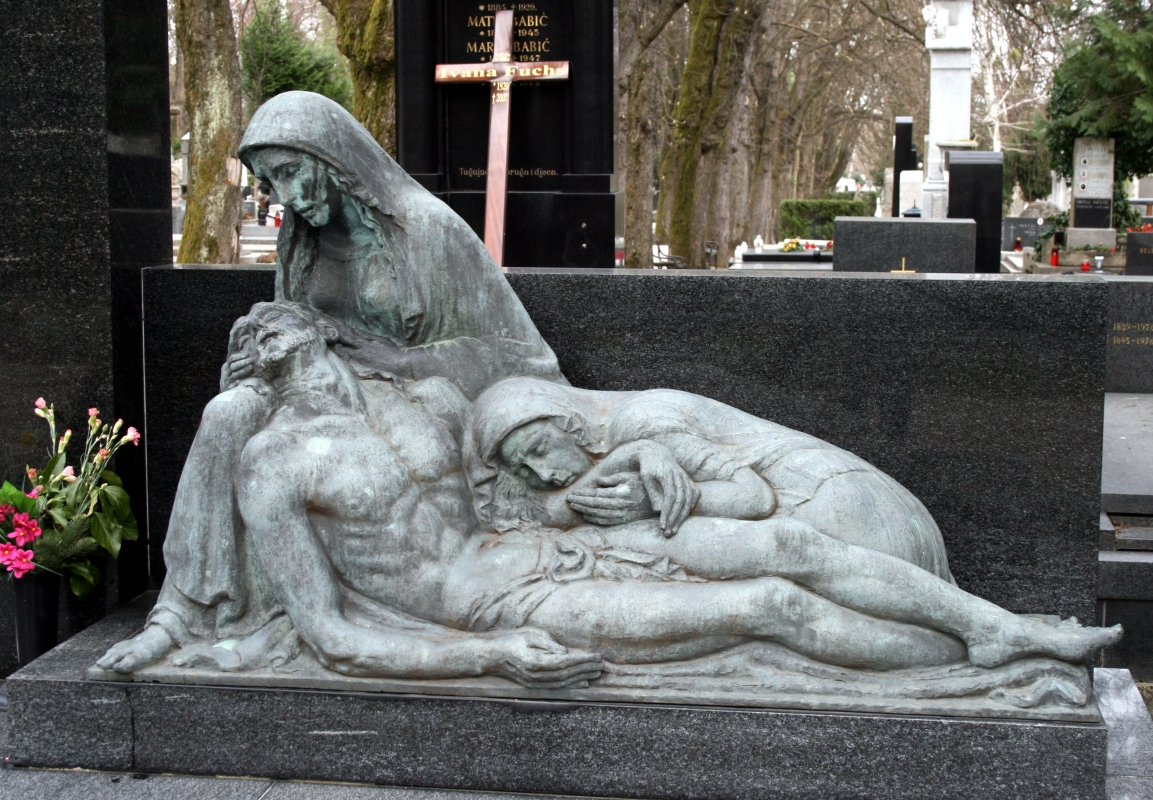
Ivo Kerdić's grave

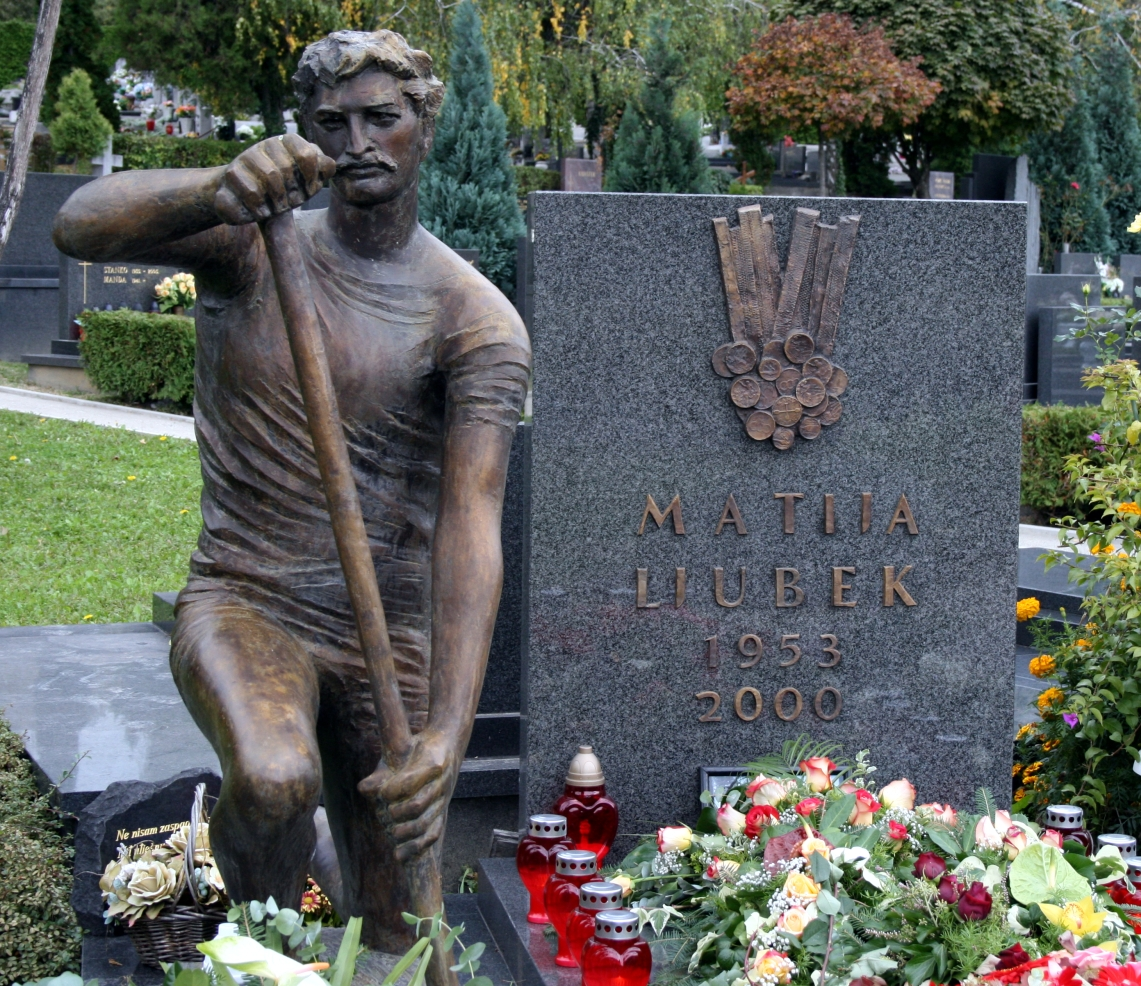
Matija Ljubek's grave

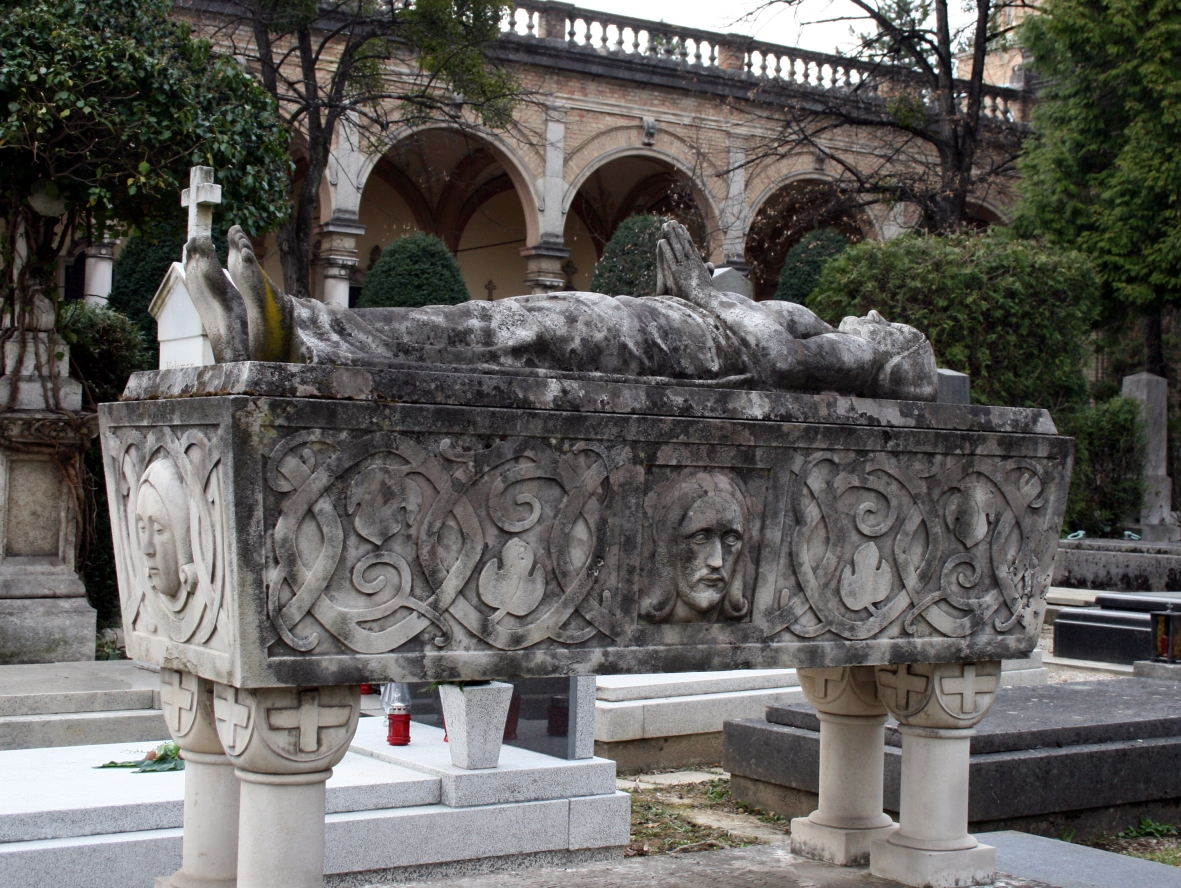
Mirko Rački's grave

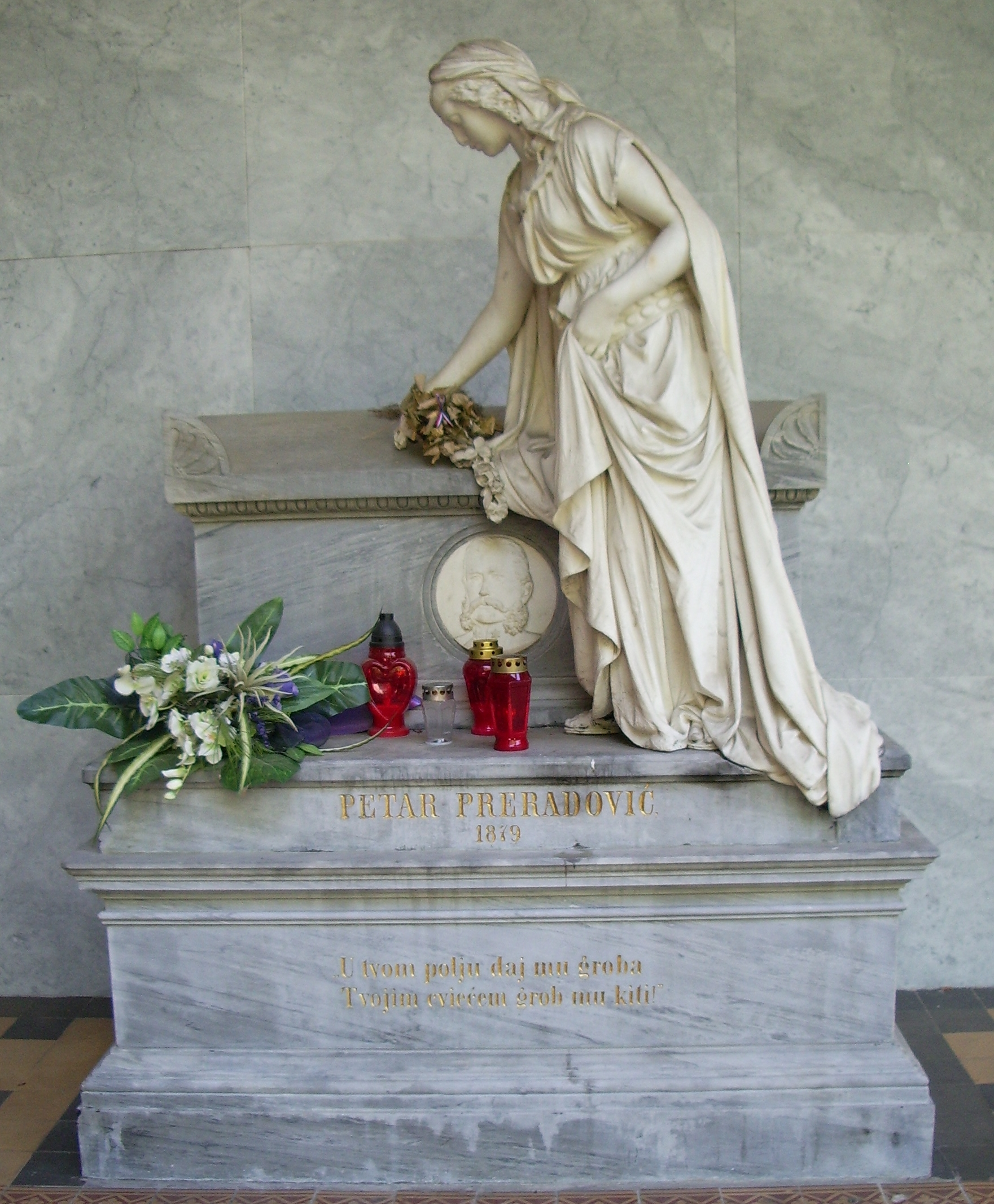
Petar Preradović's grave

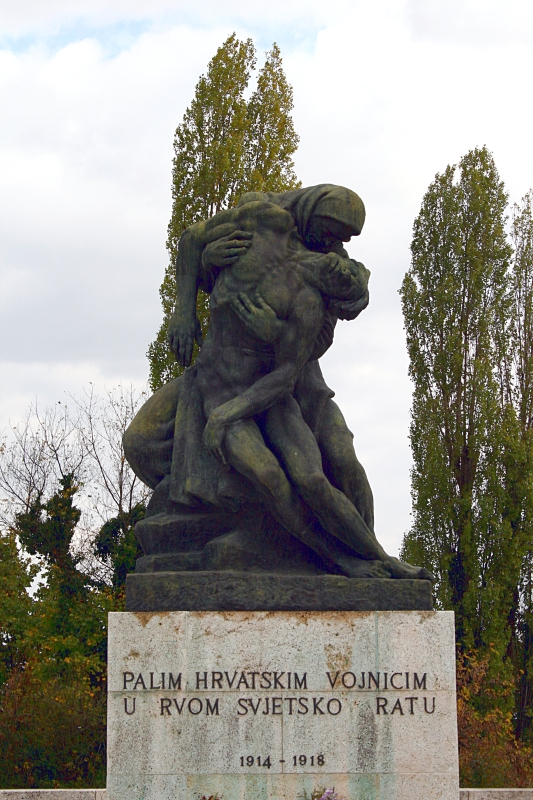
Monument to the fallen Croatian soldiers in World War I

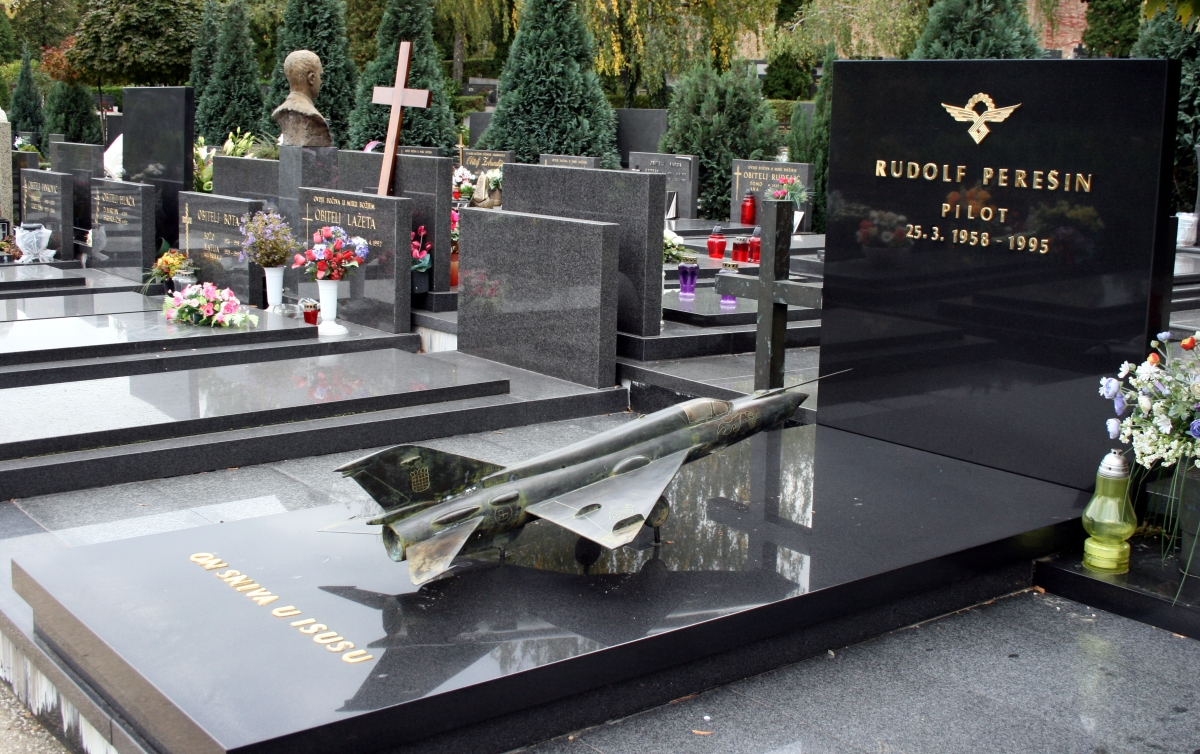
Rudolf Perešin's grave

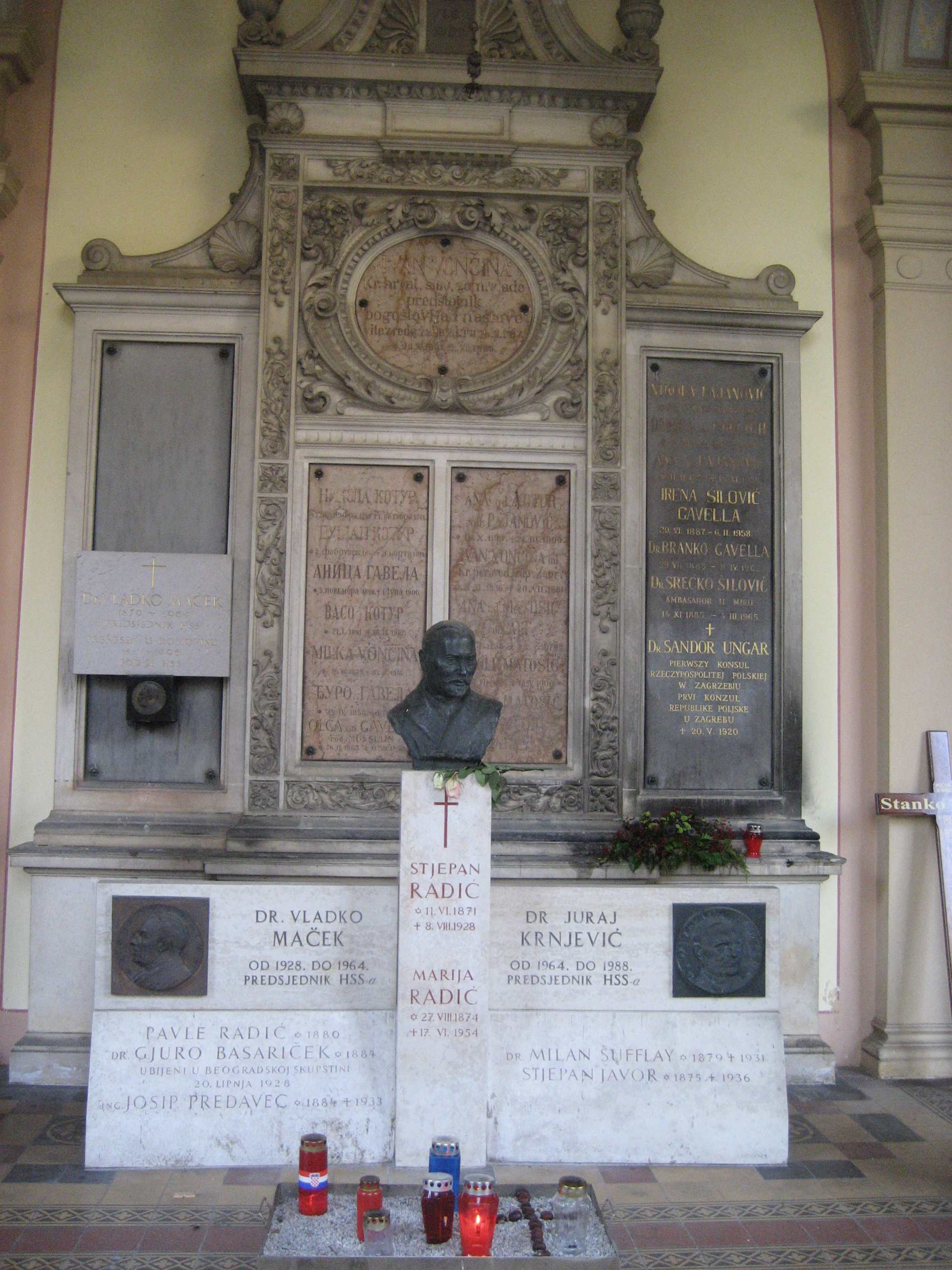
Stjepan Radić's grave

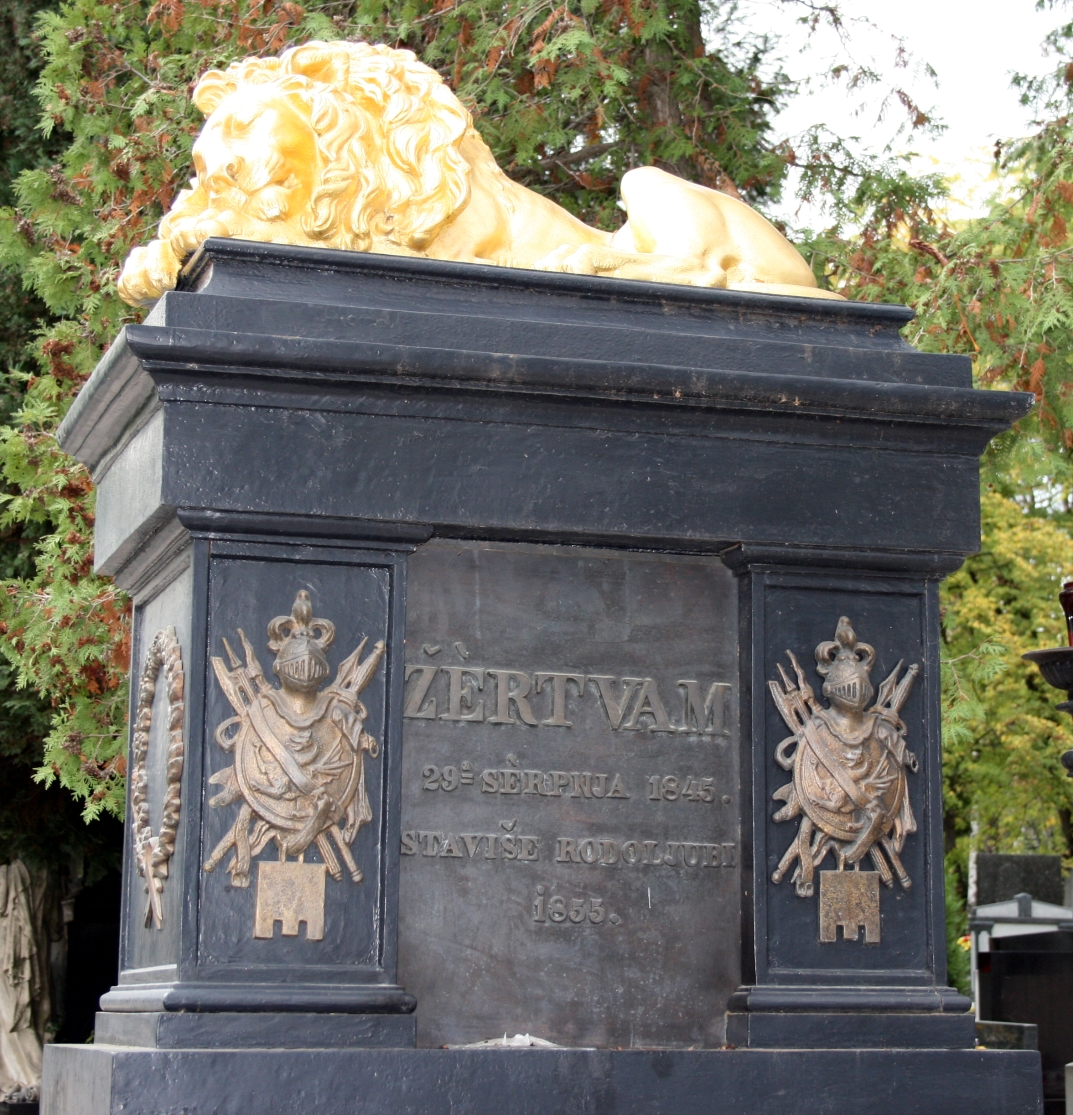
Monument to the July victims

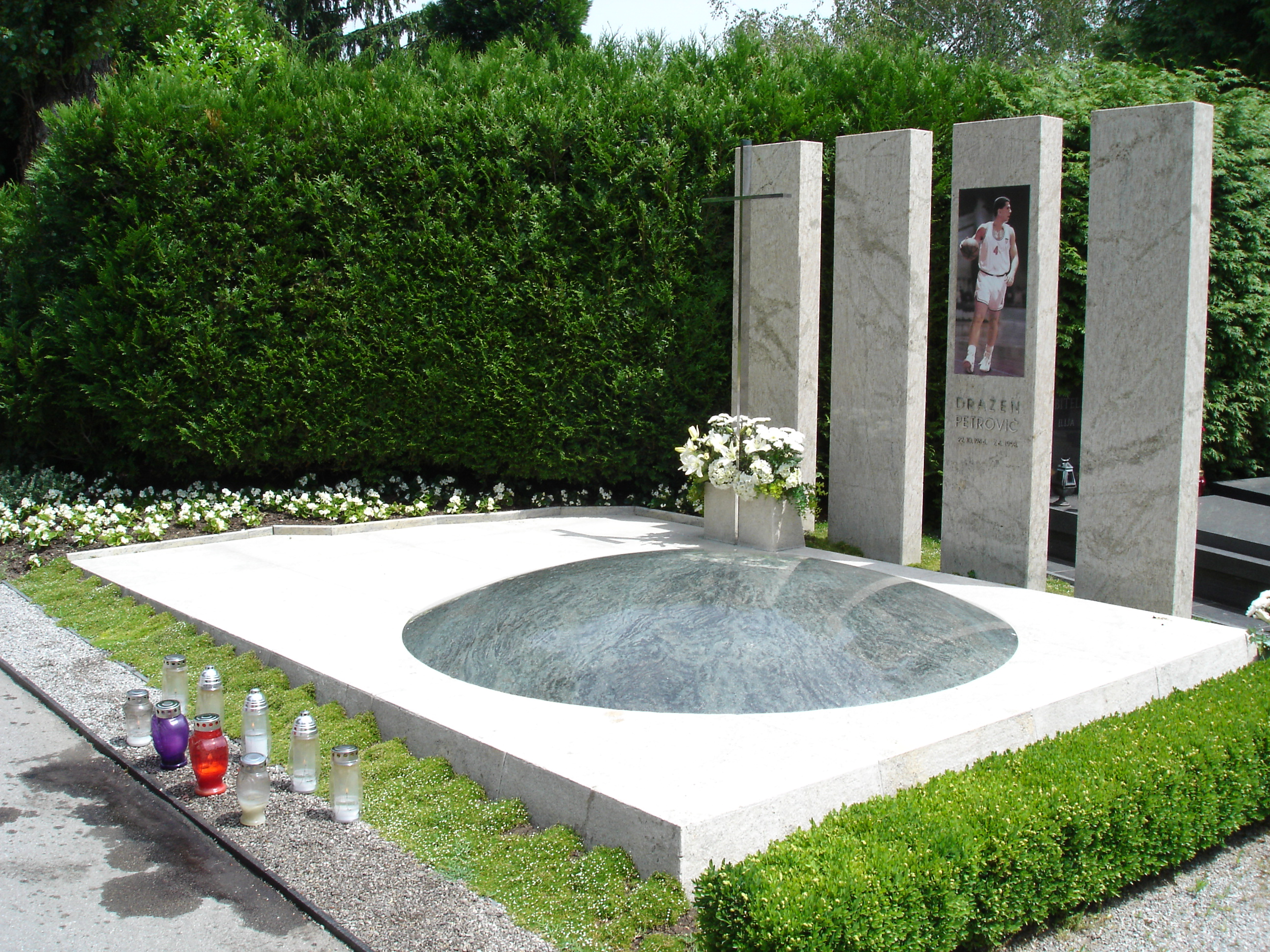
Dražen Petrović's grave

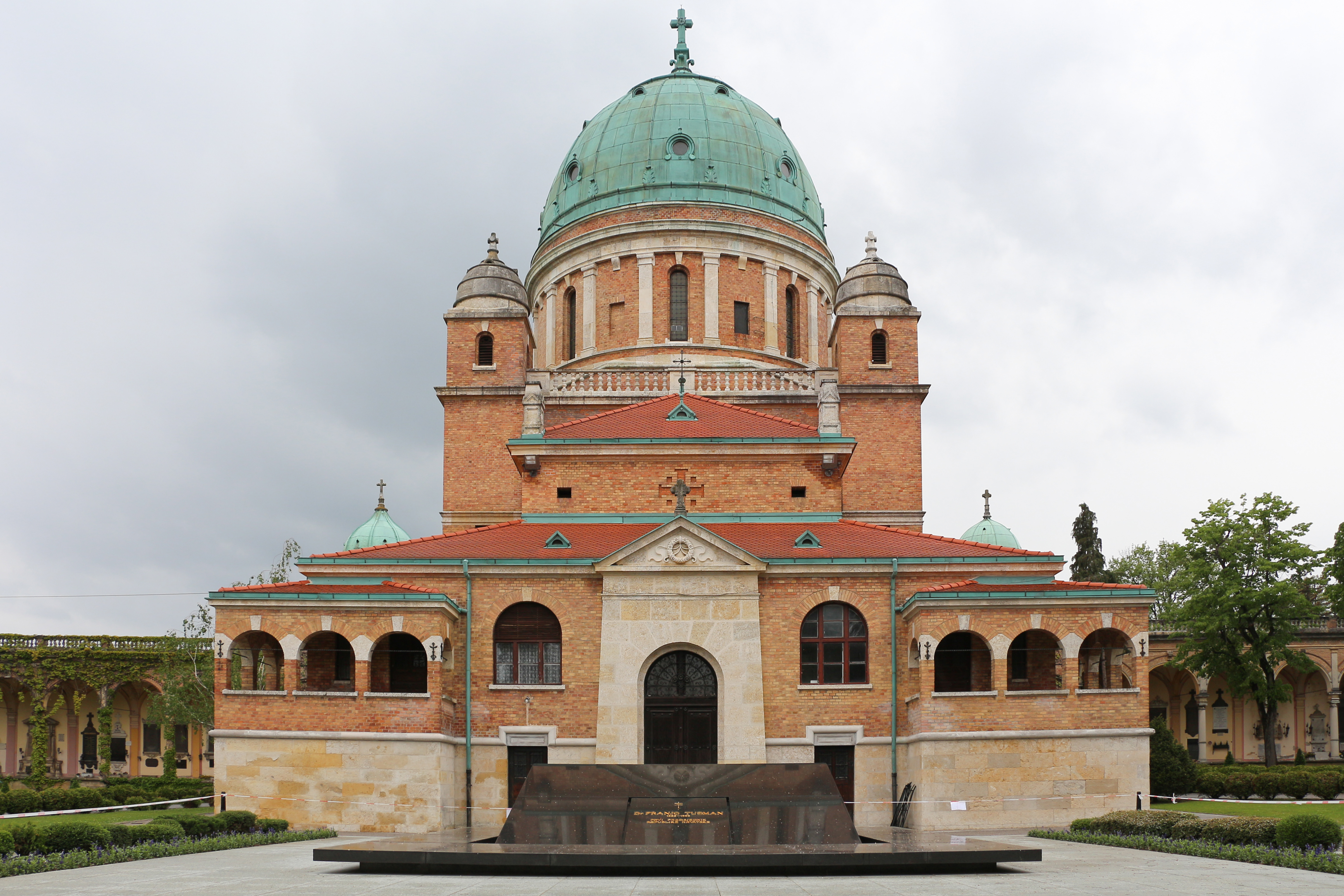
Franjo Tuđman's grave

== See also ==
- History of Zagreb
