= Križevci Synagogue =

Former synagogue in Križevci, Croatia

- Croatian: Križevačka Sinagoga
- Undated image of the former synagogue

- Location of the former synagogue in Croatia

Religion
- Affiliation: Orthodox Judaism (former)
- Rite: Nusach Ashkenaz
- Ecclesiastical or organizational status: Synagogue (1870–1941); Community use (1950s–2010s); Visitor center (since 2014)
- Status: Closed (as a synagogue); Repurposed

Location
- Location: 5 Strossmayer Square, Križevci
- Country: Croatia
- Interactive map of Križevci Synagogue
- Coordinates: 46°01′27″N 16°32′48″E

Architecture
- Architect: Hönigsberg & Deutsch
- Type: Synagogue architecture
- Style: Renaissance Revival
- Established: 1844 (as a congregation)
- Completed: 1895

The Križevci Synagogue (Croatian: Križevačka Sinagoga) is a former Orthodox Jewish synagogue, located in Križevci, Croatia. Completed in 1895, the building was used as a synagogue until World War II when it was desecrated. Following the war, the building was used for cultural events, as a youth center, and, since 2014, as a visitor center.

== History ==
Salamon Lipmann was the first Jew who settled in Križevci around 1780. In 1844, Adam Breyer founded the Jewish community Križevci. He organized, in his house, the first Križevci house of prayer for the members of the community. On November 15, 1894, with presence of Križevci mayor Ferdo Vukić, general assembly of the Jewish community talked and adopted the proposed development of the new synagogue. Architecture studio Hönigsberg & Deutsch was selected to build the new synagogue, and furniture company Bothe & Ehrmann to adapt the interior. Construction began on May 14, 1895 and four months later the synagogue was built on September 15, 1895 at the Strossmayer square. The consecration of the new synagogue and Torah transfer from old house of prayer took place on September 16, 1895. The synagogue was filled to its utmost capacity with a great crowd gathered outside.

In 1941, during World War II, the Independent State of Croatia authorities left the synagogue robbed and devastated. Two torahs have been saved by Adela Weisz with the help from her non-Jewish friends, which are now located at the Jewish museum in Belgrade. After the war in 1945, the former synagogue was taken by Križevci national committee. In agreement with the Federation of Jewish Communities of Yugoslavia, the synagogue served as a building for cultural events. During this period, the former synagogue building was significantly remodeled in a socialist-realist style, removing all architectural decorations from the façade, the main entrance was walled up, and a new side entrance was installed. Since 1967, the building was partially used as a youth center, the city library, occasionally as a theater and cultural center, and by community groups.

In November 2012, it was announced that the European Union awarded a grant to restore the interior and exterior of the former synagogue. Following restoration in 2014, the former synagogue has served as the new headquarters for the Križevci Tourist Board and local community sports associations.

== See also ==
- History of the Jews in Croatia
- List of synagogues in Croatia

== Gallery ==
An undated image of the former synagogue's façade

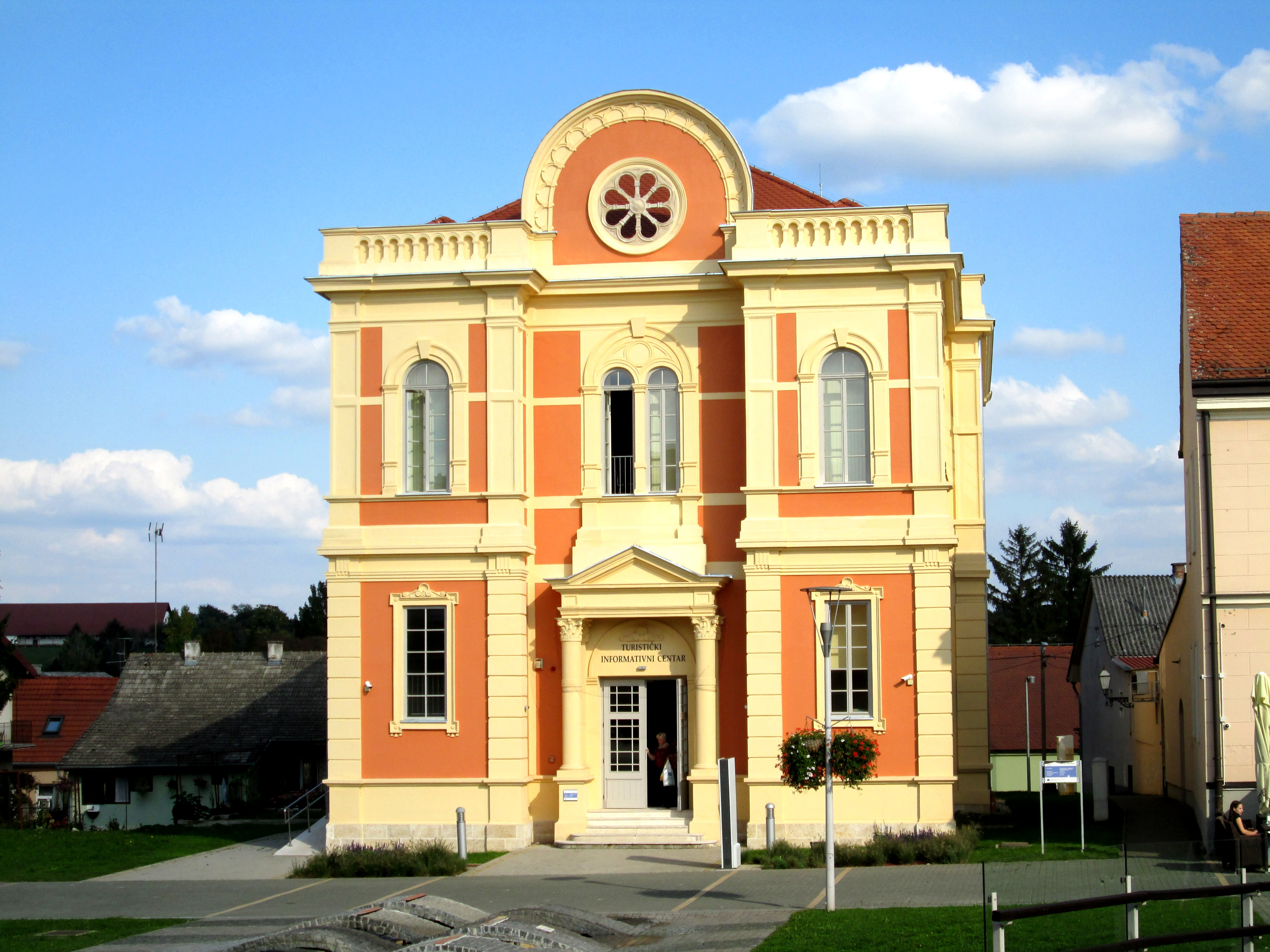
The former synagogue in 2017, restored as a tourist information center
