= Leo Hönigsberg =

Croatian architect

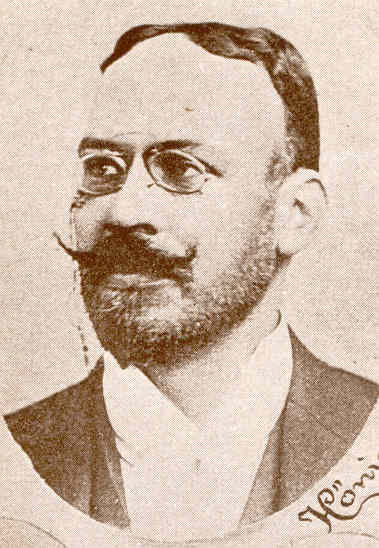
- Born: 1861; Zagreb, Austrian Empire
- Died: 2 May 1911 (aged 50); Zagreb, Austro-Hungarian Monarchy

Leo Hönigsberg (Croatian: Lavoslav Hoenigsberg, pronounced [lâʋoslaʋ xěniɡzberg]; born in 1861, died in 1911) was a famous Croatian architect and co-owner of the architecture studio Hönigsberg & Deutsch.

== Early life and family ==
Hönigsberg was born in Zagreb, Austrian Empire, to a Croatian-Jewish family. He studied in Vienna at the Technische Hochschule (today the Vienna University of Technology) under Heinrich von Ferstel where he graduated in 1883. Hönigsberg trained at the studios of Ludwig Tischler and Anton Krones.

== Later years ==
In 1887 Hönigsberg returned to Zagreb where he worked with Julio Deutsch, at Kuno Waidmann's studio on the recommendation of Hermann Helmer. In 1889 Hönigsberg and Deutsch founded the Hönigsberg & Deutsch bureau, which soon grew into one of the largest building companies in Zagreb.

After the death of Hönigsberg, in 1911, the studio was taken over by Deutsch. Hönigsberg was buried at the Mirogoj Cemetery.

== See also ==
- Hönigsberg & Deutsch
- Julio Deutsch

== Bibliography ==
- Knežević, Snješka; Laslo, Aleksander (2011). Židovski Zagreb. Zagreb: AGM, Židovska općina Zagreb. ISBN 978-953-174-393-8.
- Kraus, Ognjen (1998). Dva stoljeća povijesti i kulture Židova u Zagrebu i Hrvatskoj. Zagreb: Židovska općina Zagreb. ISBN 953-96836-2-9.
