= Leib Weissberg =

Croatian rabbi (1893–1942)

Rabbi Leib Weissberg

Personal life
- Born: Arjeh Leib Weissberg; January 9, 1893 Probużna, Kingdom of Galicia and Lodomeria, Austria-Hungary
- Died: 1942 (aged 48–49) Jasenovac concentration camp, Independent State of Croatia
- Spouse: Adela Weissberg
- Children: Samuel and Saadia Weissberg
- Parent(s): Seide and Ehaja Weissberg
- Education: Israelitisch-Theologische Lehranstalt in Vienna

Religious life
- Religion: Judaism
- Denomination: Orthodox Judaism

Jewish leader
- Position: Rabbi
- Synagogue: Slavonski Brod Synagogue
- Residence: Slavonski Brod

Leib Weissberg (January 9, 1893 – 1942) was a Slavonski Brod rabbi who was killed during the Holocaust.

Weissberg was born in Probużna (then part of Austria-Hungary) to Jewish parents Seide and Ehaja (née Ringel) Weissberg. He was married to Adela (née Taubes) Weissberg with whom he had two sons: Samuel (born on April 25, 1933, in Brod na Savi) and Saadia (born on December 28, 1936, in Slavonski Brod). Weissberg was educated at the rabbinical seminary Israelitisch-Theologische Lehranstalt in Vienna. He didn't know any Croatian when he arrived in Brod with his wife, but he quickly learned it. Weissberg was a rabbi of the Jewish Community of Slavonski Brod until World War II. His wife would often replace him at religious classes. Weissberg and his family were deported to Jasenovac concentration camp where they all were killed in 1942. Weissberg was the last rabbi of Slavonski Brod until this day.
