= Julio Deutsch =

Croatian architect

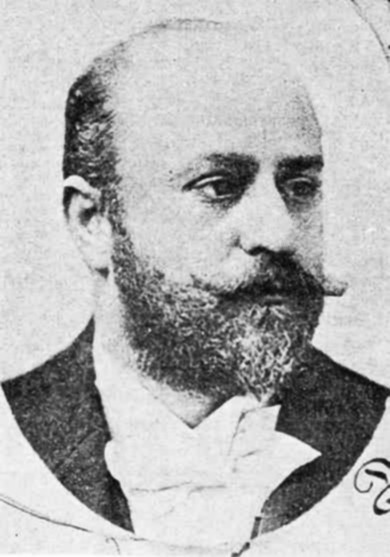
- Born: 29 September 1859; Linhartovy, Austrian Empire
- Died: 9 June 1922 (aged 62); Zagreb, Kingdom of Serbs, Croats and Slovenes

Julio Deutsch (Croatian: Julije Dajč; 29 September 1859 – 9 June 1922) was a Croatian architect known for his architectural art nouveau style.

== Early life and family ==
Deutsch was born in Geppersdorf (now Linhartovy, part of Město Albrechtice) in the Austrian Empire to a Jewish family.

== Education and later years ==
He studied at the Vienna University of Technology under Heinrich von Ferstel and Karl König. Deutsch graduated in 1882 and afterwards he moved to Paris to obtain additional practice. In 1888 he moved to Zagreb.

With the recommendation of Hermann Helmer he started his work in the studio of Kune Waidmann. Deutsch made a partnership with Leo Hönigsberg in 1889. Hönigsberg & Deutsch architecture studio was a leading architecture studio in Zagreb at the turn of 19th and 20th centuries. The studio had many associates, including several leading architects of the early 20th century like Vjekoslav Bastl, Otto Goldscheider, and Ivan Štefan.

After the death of Leo Hönigsberg, in 1911, the studio was taken over by Deutsch. In 1922 Deutsch died and the studio was inherited by his son, Pavao Deutsch. His son joined with architect Alexander Freudenreich to found Freudenreich & Deutsch Architecture studio. Deutsch was buried at the Mirogoj Cemetery.

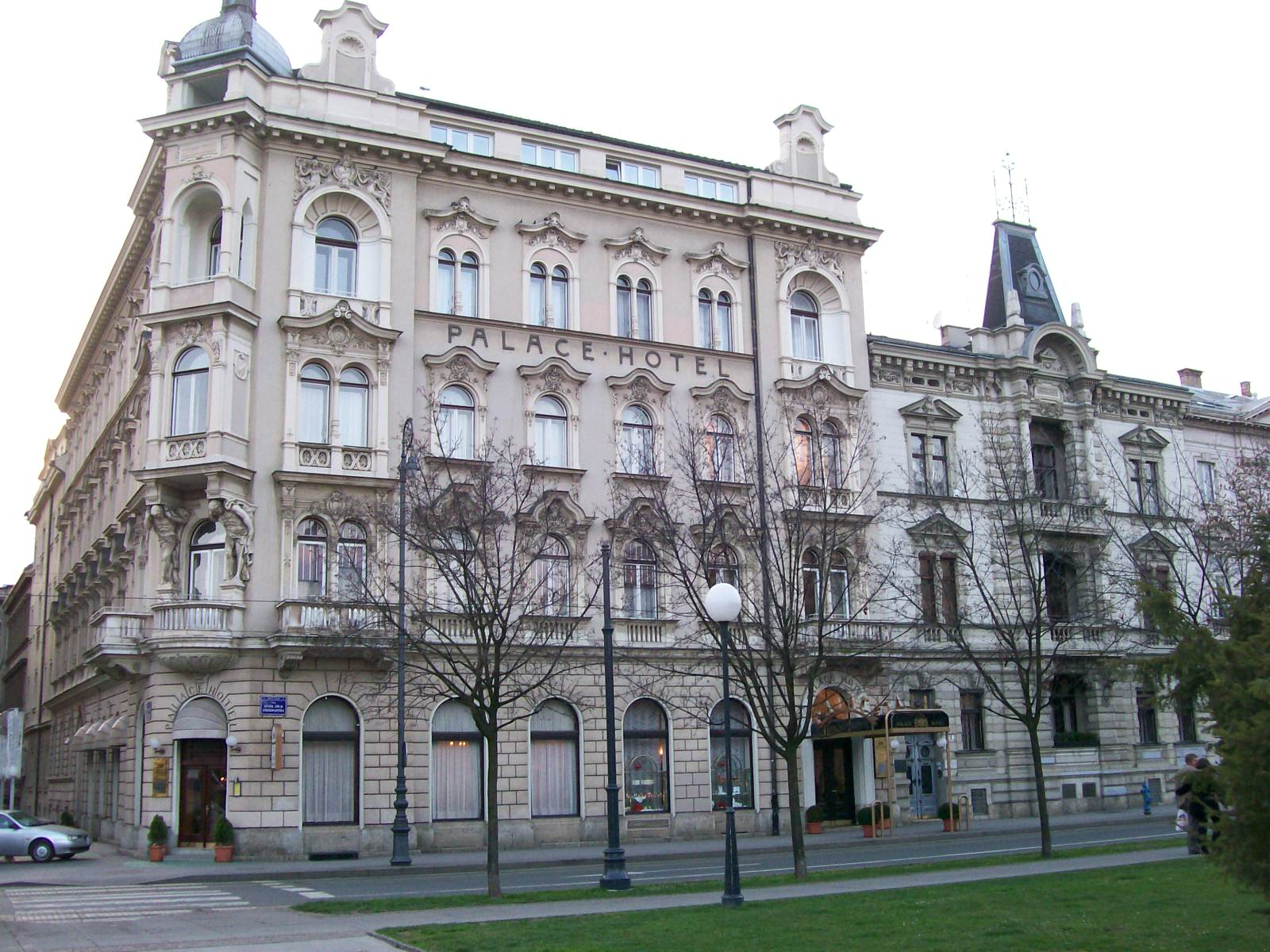
Hotel Palace in Zagreb, originally called Schlesinger Palace (1891), designed by Julio Deutsch

== See also ==
- Hönigsberg & Deutsch
- Leo Hönigsberg

== Bibliography ==
- Knežević, Snješka; Laslo, Aleksander (2011). Židovski Zagreb. Zagreb: AGM, Židovska općina Zagreb. ISBN 978-953-174-393-8.
- Kraus, Ognjen (1998). Dva stoljeća povijesti i kulture Židova u Zagrebu i Hrvatskoj. Zagreb: Židovska općina Zagreb. ISBN 953-96836-2-9.
