= Bjelovar Synagogue =

Former synagogue in Bjelovar, Croatia

- Croatian: Bjelovar Izraelitički templ
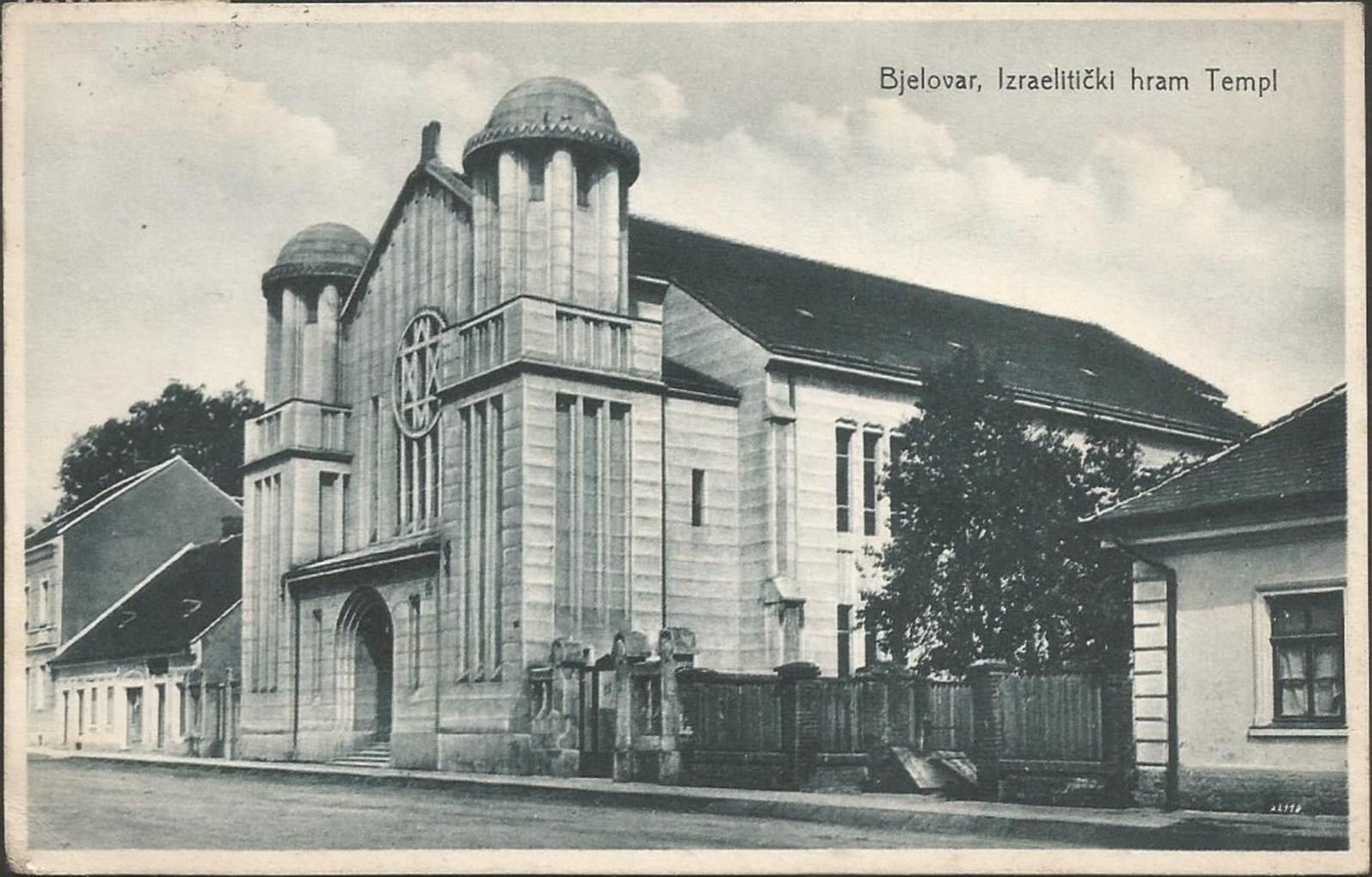
- The former synagogue, now cultural center, in the 1920s, with domes

- Location of the former synagogue in Croatia

Religion
- Affiliation: Orthodox Judaism (former)
- Rite: Nusach Ashkenaz
- Ecclesiastical or organizational status: Synagogue (1917–c. 1941); Cultural center (since c. 1950s)
- Status: Closed (as a synagogue); Repurposed

Location
- Location: Ivana Mažuranića 6, Bjelovar, Bjelovar-Bilogora County
- Country: Croatia
- Interactive map of Bjelovar Synagogue
- Coordinates: 45°54′00″N 16°50′38″E

Architecture
- Architects: Hönigsberg & Deutsch; Otto Goldscheider
- Type: Synagogue architecture
- Style: Art Nouveau
- Completed: 1917
- Construction cost: 160,000 Austro-Hungarian krone
- Dome: Two (since removed)

The Bjelovar Synagogue (Croatian: Izraelitički templ) is a former Orthodox Jewish synagogue, located in Bjelovar, Croatia. Built in 1917, partially destroyed during World War II, the building has served as the House of Culture in Bjelovar, a cultural center, since the 1950s.

== History ==
The first Jewish temple in Bjelovar was built in 1882. During the years number of Jews in Bjelovar increased, so the current temple could no longer meet the needs of Jewish community Bjelovar. The idea of building the new synagogue dates to 1913, when general assembly of the Jewish community Bjelovar, under president Jaša Hržić, decided to build a new, large and attractive synagogue. At the time, around 500 Jews lived in Bjelovar. According to calculations the synagogue construction cost 160,000 Austro-Hungarian krone. Synagogue was designed by Hönigsberg & Deutsch architect Otto Goldscheider. Construction began in 1913, and in 1917 the Art Nouveau Bjelovar Synagogue was completed. Bjelovar Synagogue was consecrated by Bjelovar chief rabbi Samuel D. Tauber and Virovitica chief rabbi H. E. Kauffmann. Torah transfer from the old synagogue to new took place on 15 August 1917. The inaugural rabbi was Lazar Margulies.

During World War II, almost all Bjelovar Jews were killed during the Holocaust. The synagogue was robbed and left devastated. After the war, Bjelovar Synagogue was turned into a theater in 1951. Domes and religious characteristics on the synagogue were removed; only the Star of David was left in the interior upper floor. Today, Bjelovar Synagogue serves as the House of Culture in Bjelovar, a cultural center.

== Gallery ==
1917 Torah transfer from old synagogue to new Bjelovar Synagogue

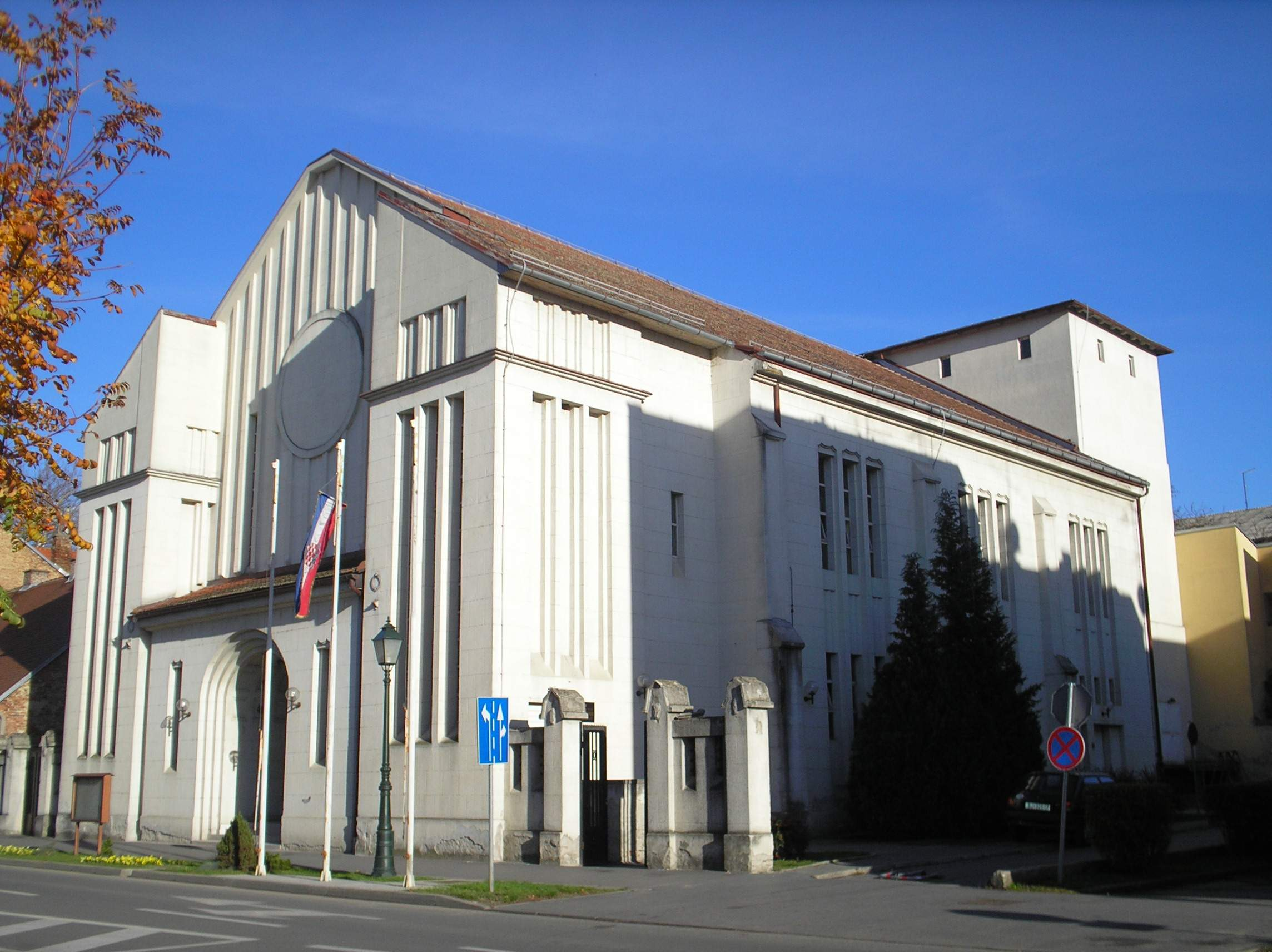
The former synagogue, now as the House of Culture in Bjelovar

== See also ==
- History of the Jews in Croatia
- List of synagogues in Croatia
