= Hönigsberg & Deutsch =

Architecture studio in Zagreb

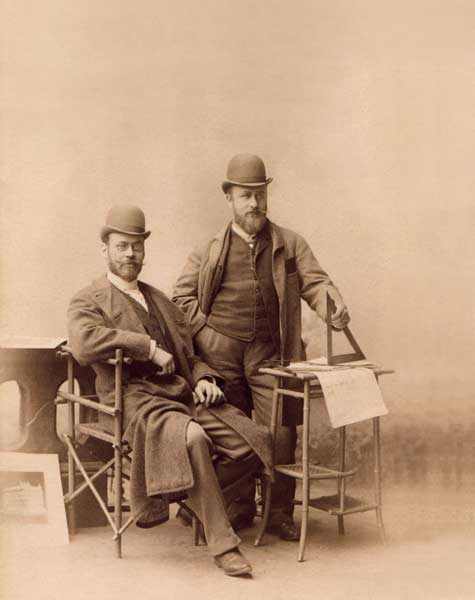
Leo Hönigsberg (sitting) and Julius Deutsch

Hönigsberg & Deutsch was an architecture studio and construction company formed in Zagreb by architects Leo Hönigsberg and Julio Deutsch, active between 1889 and 1911. They produced over 90 known works in the Lower Town area of Zagreb, built during the redevelopment in the years following the 1880 Zagreb earthquake. The majority of these were residential houses, but they also designed manufacturing plants, synagogues and public institution buildings.

== History ==
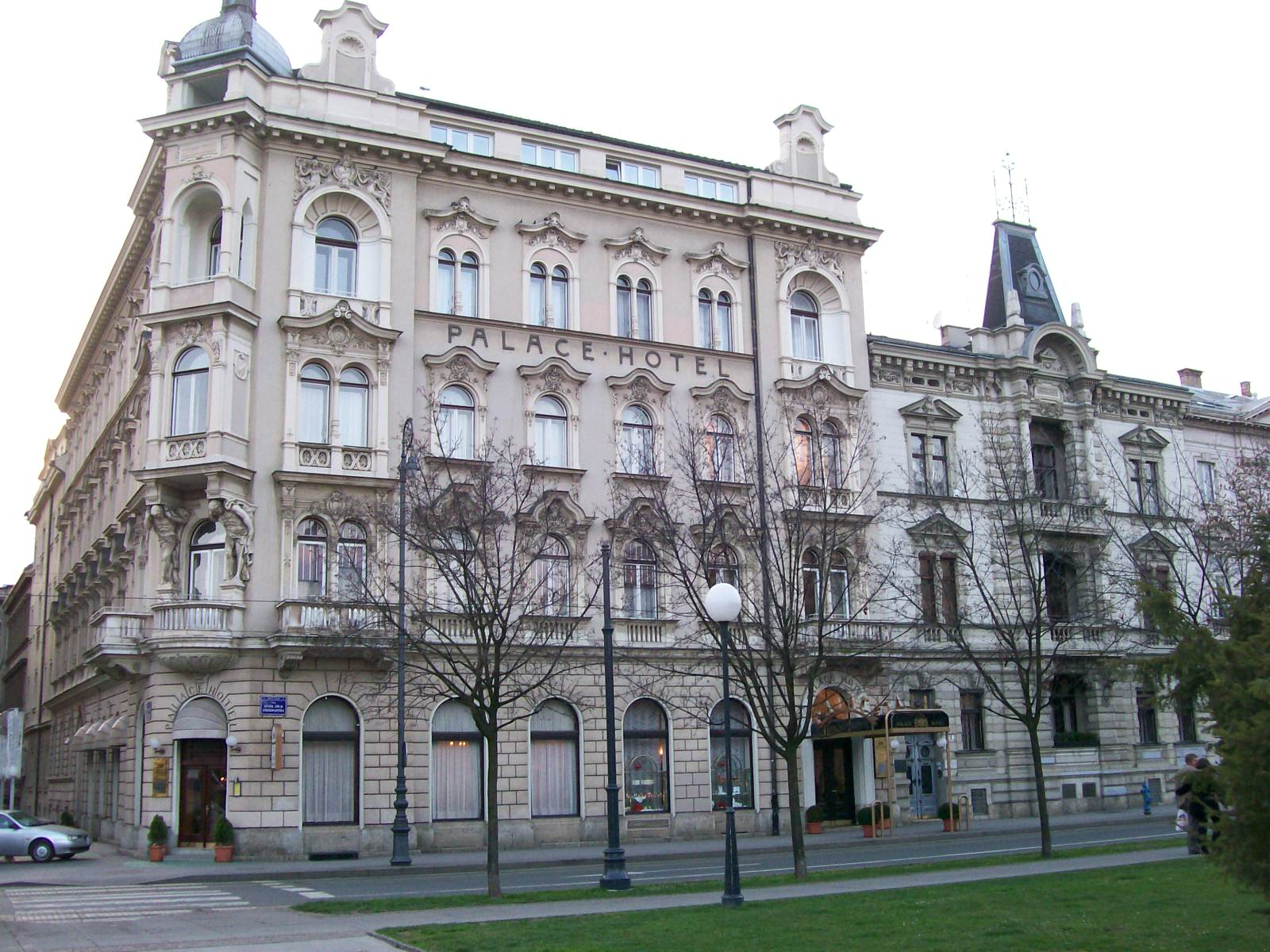
Hotel Palace, originally called Schlesinger Palace (1891)

House and studio of painter Vlaho Bukovac at 17 King Tomislav square in Zagreb (1896)

Leo Hönigsberg (Zagreb, 1861 – Zagreb, 1911) and Julije Deutsch (Geppersdorf, 1859 – Zagreb, 1922) both studied in Vienna at the Technische Hochschule (today the Vienna University of Technology) under Heinrich von Ferstel, where Deutsch graduated in 1882 and Hönigsberg in 1883. Hönigsberg then trained at the studios of Ludwig Tischler (1883–84) and Anton Krones (1885–86), while Julije Deutsch worked for a time in Paris with Camille Lefèvre.

In 1887 Hönigsberg returned to Zagreb, and was joined by Julije Deutsch the following year. They worked at Kuno Waidmann's studio in 1888 on the recommendation of Hermann Helmer. In 1889 they founded the Hönigsberg & Deutsch bureau, which soon grew into one of the largest building companies in Zagreb. The company worked on more than 100 projects in Zagreb and northern Croatia, mostly residential buildings and state institutions, although most of the company's projects after 1900 were done by other architects working at their studio. After Hönigsberg died in 1911 the studio was taken over by Julije Deutsch, and after he died in 1922 his son Pavao Deutsch inherited it. He then joined Aleksandar Freudenreich and founded the Freudenreich & Deutsch studio in 1923 which was active until 1940.

== Works ==
Hönigsberg & Deutsch's buildings are regarded as some of the finest examples of late historicism architecture, with an eclectic mix of Renaissance Revival, Baroque and Rococo elements, while the Pečić House (1899) and Kallina House (built in 1904 and designed by Vjekoslav Bastl for Hönigsberg & Deutsch) marked a break with the traditionalist style and are considered amongst the finest examples of Secessionist-style architecture in Zagreb.

Their notable works in Zagreb include Koprivnica Synagogue (1875), Halper House (1888), Hönigsberg House (1888), Schlesinger Palace (today Palace Hotel, 1891), the Preister-Schillinger House (1893), the Teachers' Association Building (today the Croatian School Museum, 1888), the Farkaš House (1898), the Spitzer House (1899), the Zagreb Paper Factory building (Zagrebačka tvornica papira, 1894), the County Court building (Kotarski sud, 1898), the building of the Home Guard Command (Hrvatsko-slavonsko domobransko zapovjedništvo, 1900), the Chamber of Commerce (now the Ethnographic Museum, 1903), the Croat–Slavonian Central Savings Bank (1905) and the Penkala pencil factory (1911). Outside Zagreb their works include the Gavrilović Brothers meat factory in Petrinja (1895), the Križevci Synagogue (1895), the Slavonski Brod Synagogue (1895), the Finance Agency building in Požega (Financijalno ravnateljstvo, 1897), and the Bjelovar Synagogue (1917).

Projects built after 1900 were mostly works of other architects working at the studio, including Vjekoslav Bastl, Ivan Štefan and Otto Goldscheider, and the company also contracted construction projects for many buildings in Zagreb designed by other architects, such as the Croatian National Theatre, (designed by Fellner & Helmer, 1895), the Croatian Discount Bank (Fellner & Helmer, 1899), the Art Pavilion (Fellner & Helmer, 1898), the Royal Forestry Agency building (Kraljevsko šumarsko ravnateljstvo, Alexander Aigner, 1899), the State Railways building (Direkcija državnih željeznica, Ferenc Pfaff, 1903), and the admissions building of the Šalata Hospital (Dionis Sunko, 1909). Outside Zagreb their company constructed the Pakrac Hospital building (Dionis Sunko, 1909).

== See also ==
- Leo Hönigsberg
- Julio Deutsch
