= Slavonski Brod Synagogue =

Former synagogue in Slavonski Brod, Croatia

- Croatian: Brodska sinagogaa
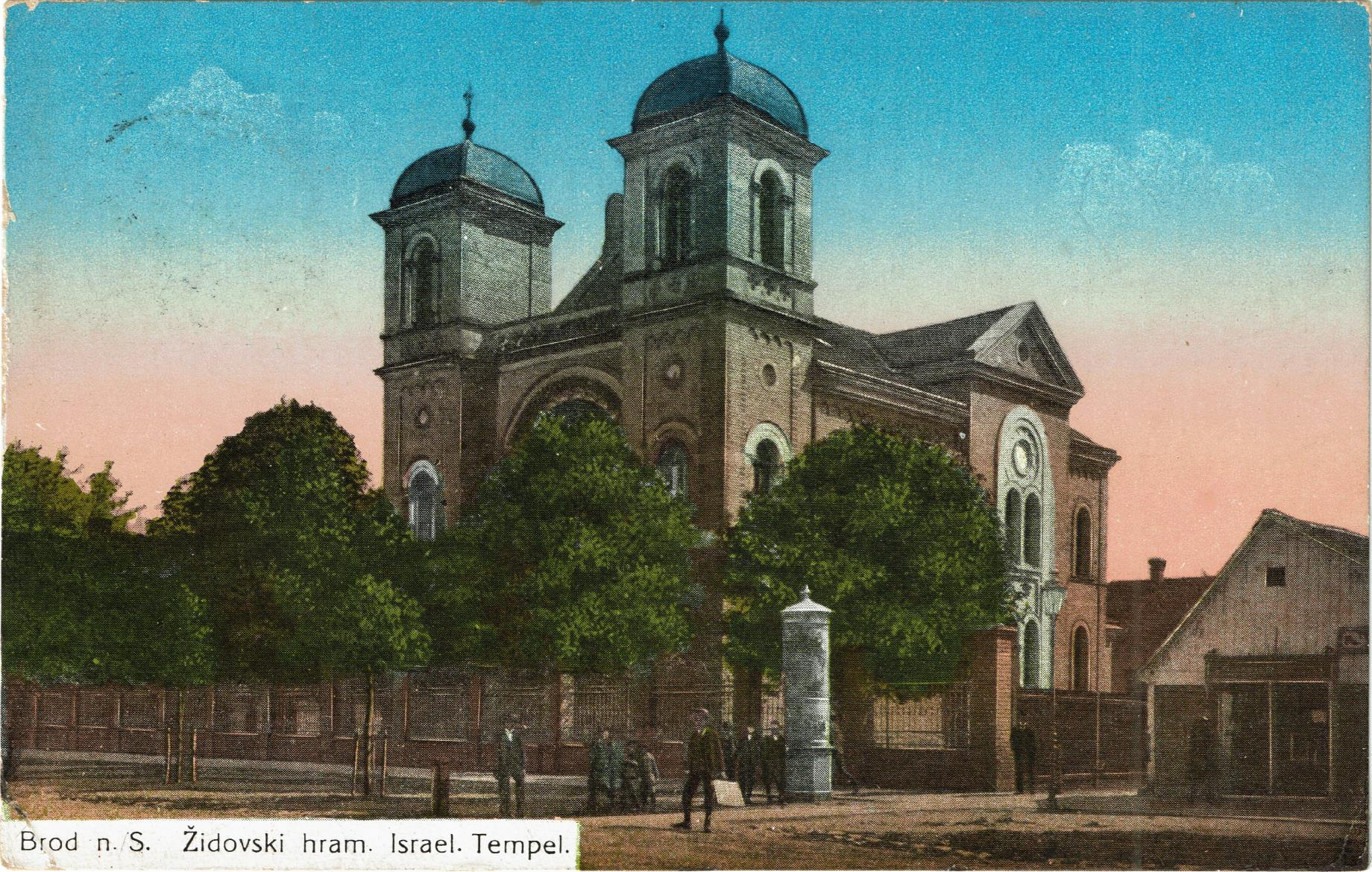
- postcard of 1915

- Location of the destroyed synagogue in Croatia

Religion
- Affiliation: Judaism (former)
- Rite: Nusach Ashkenaz
- Ecclesiastical or organizational status: Synagogue (1896–c. 1941)
- Status: Destroyed

Location
- Location: Petra Kresimira IV Street 8, Slavonski Brod
- Country: Croatia
- Interactive map of Slavonski Brod Synagogue
- Coordinates: 45°09′20″N 18°00′45″E

Architecture
- Architect: Hönigsberg & Deutsch
- Type: Synagogue architecture
- Style: Neo-Mudéjar
- Completed: 1896
- Destroyed: 1944
- Dome: Two

The Slavonski Brod Synagogue (Croatian: Brodska sinagogaa) was a synagogue of the Jewish Community Slavonski Brod.

== History ==
Jakob Kohn, the president of the Jewish Community Slavonski Brod, directed the construction of the Slavonski Brod Synagogue, completed in 1896, as designed in the Neo-Mudéjar style by Hönigsberg & Deutsch. At the time, the Jewish Community Slavonski Brod counted over 110 members.

The synagogue was burned by Nazis in 1941, and its remains were bombed by allied forces during the bombing of Slavonski Brod in 1944. The congregation's rabbi, Leib Weissberg, was killed with his family at the Jasenovac concentration camp in 1942.

On November 3, 1994, a memorial plaque was unveiled to commemorate the site of the former synagogue.

== See also ==
- History of the Jews in Croatia
- List of synagogues in Croatia
