= Filip Deutsch =

Croatian industrialist

Filip Deutsch pl. Maceljski
- Born: Freivel Benjamin Deutsch; 16 March 1828; Zagreb, Kingdom of Croatia, Austrian Empire
- Died: 6 May 1919 (aged 91); Zagreb, Kingdom of Serbs, Croats and Slovenes
- Resting place: Mirogoj Cemetery
- Citizenship: Croatia
- Spouse: Amalija (née Schwarz) Deutsch
- Children: Vilim; Albert; Benko

Filip Deutsch pl. Maceljski (born Freivel Benjamin Deutsch; March 16, 1828 – May 6, 1919) was a Croatian nobleman, industrialist who had a significant impact on the development of Turopolje near Velika Gorica and timber industry in that region.

Deutsch was born on March 16, 1828, to a Jewish family. He was married to Amalija (née Schwarz) Deutsch with whom he had three sons, Vilim, Albert and Benko. His sons later became notable Croatian industrialists and philanthropists. From early age Deutsch was an active entrepreneur. In Zagreb he had a storage company for timber and firewood sale. In 1884 his company "Filip Deutsch i sinovi Zagreb" (Filip Deutsch and sons Zagreb) produced the columns for the Podsused bridge. Deutsch bought, in 1910, 50 acres of land from the noble municipality Turopolje. On that land, in 1911, Deutsch founded the steam sawmill in Turopolje which he named "Paropilana Filipa Deutscha sinova". He immediately began to lift the objects for the sawmill, houses for workers and specialists which were brought from Zagreb and other Croatian regions. Houses were built in rows and were called "Kolonija" (The Colony). In June 1911 Deutsch sawmill started to produce oak sawn wood, mostly from the Turopolje forest, with the capacity of 40,000 m3. Deutsch built and spread the sawmill as production expanded. He also built about 10 kilometers of railways for the Burdelj and Turopoljski lug. At the peak of success Deutsch sawmill employed about 600 workers. Deutsch's workers were treated fairly with an eight-hour working day, which was a rarity at the time, with supplied hot meals, decent salaries and housing for every worker. Deutsch was also a great philanthropist who often aided the poor. In Zagreb, twice a year, he would donate two to three wagons of wood during the winter. For his contribution to the development of Turopolje region Deutsch was awarded with the title pl. (plemeniti (in Croatian) = noble (in English)) Maceljski per Macelj forest.

Deutsch died in Zagreb on May 6, 1919. He was buried in the family crypt at the Mirogoj Cemetery.

== Bibliography ==
- Goldstein, Ivo (2001). Holokaust u Zagrebu. Zagreb: Novi Liber. ISBN 953-6045-19-2.
- Kraus, Ognjen (1998). Dva stoljeća povijesti i kulture Židova u Zagrebu i Hrvatskoj. Zagreb: Židovska općina Zagreb. ISBN 953-96836-2-9.
- Laszowski, Emilij (2010). Povjesni spomenici plem. općine Turopolja nekoć "Zagrebačko polje". BiblioLife. ISBN 978-114-922-463-2.
- Goldstein, Ivo (2005). Židovi u Zagrebu 1918 - 1941. Zagreb: Novi Liber. ISBN 953-6045-23-0.
