= Aleksandar Ehrmann =

Croatian businessperson

- Born: 14 September 1879; Podbuż, Austro-Hungarian Monarchy, (now Ukraine)
- Died: 13 April 1965 (aged 85); Zagreb, SFR Yugoslavia (now Croatia)
- Spouse: Dora (née Wilczek) Ehrmann
- Children: Ada (b. 1909); Hedi (b. 1913); Leon (b. 1916)
- Relatives: Ignac Ehrmann (father); Adela (née Liebermann) Ehrmann (mother)

Aleksandar Ehrmann (September 14, 1879 – April 13, 1965) was known Croatian industrialist, philanthropist and diplomat.

== Early life and practice ==
Ehrmann was born in Podbuż in the Kingdom of Galicia and Lodomeria to a wealthy Jewish family of Ignac and Adela (née Liebermann) Ehrmann. He had three brothers, Leon, Oskar and Leopold. The whole Ehrmann family was involved in the wood industry. Inspired by family tradition, from early childhood Ehrmann was prepared for the lead positions in the wood industry, so in the period from 1899 until 1908 he worked at several prestigious wood processing companies. In the 1899 he started working at the sawmill branch of Freundlich brothers from Munich. In 1901 he moved to Vienna and started working at the prestigious flooring factory of Engel brothers. He stayed in Vienna for two years. From 1907 until 1908 he worked for Budapest wood industry "Mundus", which was owned by his family, at the plant in Uzhhorod, in the factory "Vrata" in the Gorski Kotar as the chief of supply, and finally at the furniture factory in Varaždin as the chief. In his youth, Ehrmann worked in as many leading wood companies as he could, visited several industrial processing plants, so he could apply that knowledge and experience in his own company.

== Business, political and diplomatic career ==
The furniture company "Bothe & Ehrmann" d.d., owned by Ehrmann

In 1916, Ehrmann took over the family wood processing company "Slavonija" d.d. from Slavonski Brod, as the owner – general manager, which he led until 1934. The company was founded in 1903 by his brother, Leon. From 1919, together with his brother Oskar, Ehrmann owned and led the furniture company "Bothe & Ehrmann" d.d. from Zagreb, which was founded in 1895 by his cousin Samuel Ehrmann and Eugen Ferdinand Bothe. Under Ehrmannn, by 1934, "Bothe & Ehrmann" d.d. employed over 500 workers and was the largest furniture company in the Austro-Hungarian Empire. On June 8, 1917 Ehrmann was elected as a Slavonski Brod city councilman, a duty he performed until 1919. Ehrmann was also the general manager of the "Jugoslavenska šuma" d.d. from Zagreb, and the wood industry "Una" d.d. from Bosanska Dubica. In 1923 he encouraged and initiated the establishment of the "Wagon, machinery and bridge factory company" in Slavonski Brod (now "Đuro Đaković d.d.") by attracting foreign capital. Ehrmann was the regular member of the "Industrialists Union" and "Commercial Chamber". On April 30, 1925 Ehrmann was one of the notables who founded "Aero Club Zagreb". Ehrmann was also a board member of the Zagreb section of the "Yugoslav Automobile Club", and has held senior positions in the club for several terms. Ehrmann was honorary consul of Portugal for 30 years.

Inside the furniture company "Bothe & Ehrmann" d.d.

== Family and later life ==
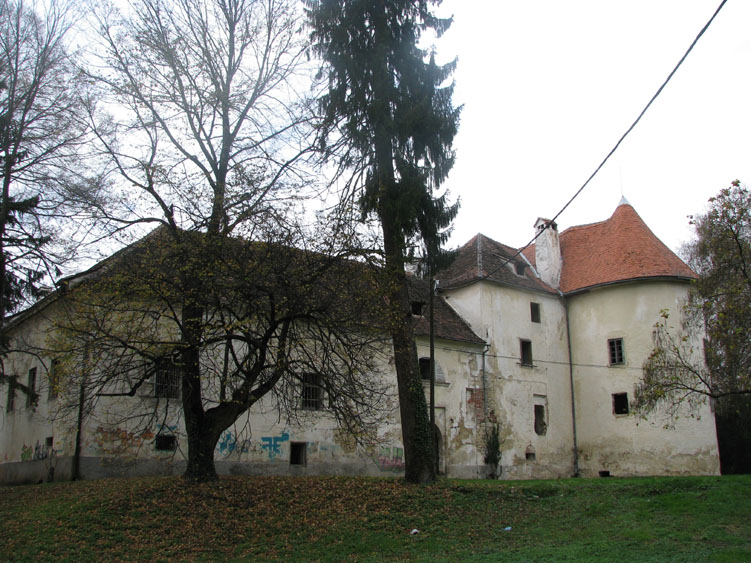
Erdödy Castle in Jastrebarsko, once owned by Ehrmann family

While living in Varaždin, at the age of 27, Ehrmann meet Dora (née Wilczek), the daughter of a wealthy Jewish entrepreneur Albert Wilczek and his wife Elizabeth née Deutsch. They married on December 22, 1907, at the Varaždin synagogue. After the wedding, Ehrmann moved with his wife to Slavonski Brod, where his company was located. In 1909 their oldest daughter Ada was born. In 1912 Ehrmann family moved to Zagreb. In 1913 their second daughter Hedi was born, and in 1916 son Leon. In April 1918, Ehrmann moved with his family to Budapest, and in March 1919 they returned to Zagreb. Given the fact that Ehrmann family permanently settled in Zagreb, in 1922 architect Viktor Kovačić built the villa for the Ehrmann family which was located at Jurjevska ulica 23. Ehrmann and his family were known philanthropists who aided the poor and needy, city of Zagreb, various Catholic and Jewish organizations, Red Cross Croatia and others. On May 16, 1926 Ehrmann bought a castle, from Ljudevit Erdödy, in Jastrebarsko with the whole estate and hunting ground for the amount of 2.5 million dinars. Ehrmann had invested a large sum of funds on the castle reconstruction, which was in poor condition.

During World War II, with the Independent State of Croatia regime in power, Ehrmann and his family were required to submit mandatory application of wealth to the office for the Jews at Ministry of Public economy. Ante Pavelić ordered that Ehrmann is to be treated as the representative of Portugal in Croatia. Ehrmann helped Jews escape the Independent State of Croatia, by issuing them visas for Portugal. His son Leon was jailed in Nazi Germany as an officer of the Kingdom of Yugoslavia army, and his daughter Ada escaped to Split with her husband Julius Weinreb, which was under Fascist Italy occupation. During the war, Ehrmann helped, protected and saved the victims of the Nazi terror. From 1939 to 1942 he also gave considerable sums of money for the fight against the Nazis.

After the war, although anti-fascist, Ehrmann was a class enemy of the newly established SFR Yugoslavia. Ehrmann right to a pension was not recognized, and his wealth and properties were not returned to him. He lived, with his wife, modestly until his death on April 13, 1965, in Zagreb. He was buried in the family grave at Mirogoj Cemetery arcades.

== Bibliography ==
- Snješka Knežević, Aleksander Laslo (2011). Židovski Zagreb. Zagreb: AGM, Židovska općina Zagreb. ISBN 978-953-174-393-8.
- Goldstein, Ivo (2001). Holokaust u Zagrebu. Zagreb: Novi Liber. ISBN 953-6045-19-2.
