= Kopřivná =

- Municipality
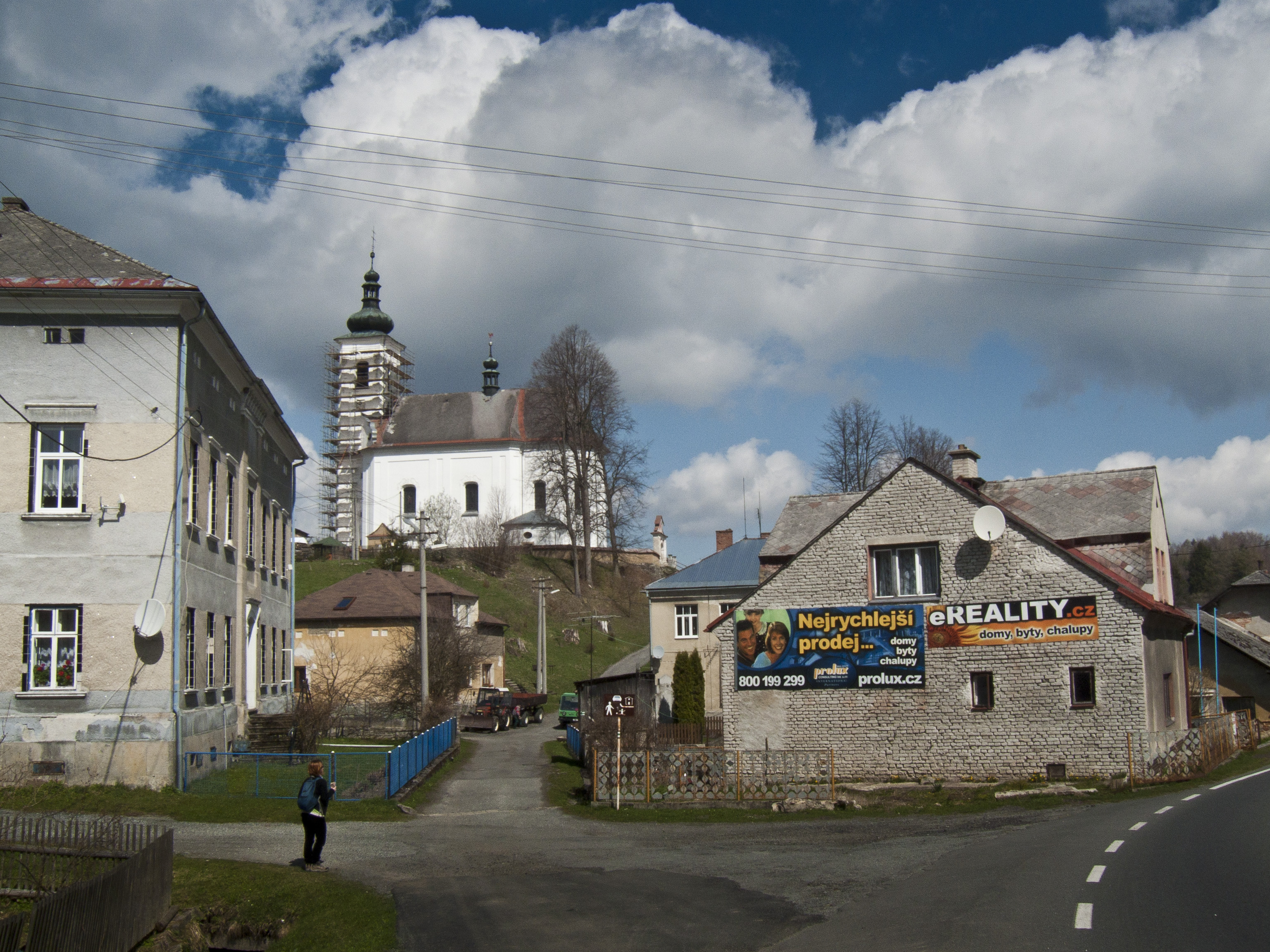
- View towards the Church of the Holy Trinity

- Flag Coat of arms

- Location in the Czech Republic
- Coordinates: 50°2′47″N 16°56′49″E
- Country: Czech Republic
- Region: Olomouc
- District: Šumperk
- First mentioned: 1414

Area
  - Total: 11.85 km^{2} (4.58 sq mi)
- Elevation: 571 m (1,873 ft)

Population (2026-01-01)
  - Total: 305
  - Density: 25.7/km^{2} (66.7/sq mi)
- Time zone: UTC+1 (CET)
  - Summer (DST): UTC+2 (CEST)
- Postal codes: 788 33
- Website: www.obeckoprivna.cz

Kopřivná (German: Geppersdorf) is a municipality and village in Šumperk District in the Olomouc Region of the Czech Republic. It has about 300 inhabitants.

== Administrative division ==
Kopřivná consists of two municipal parts (in brackets population according to the 2021 census):

- Kopřivná (261)
- Lužná (21)

== Etymology ==
The original German name Geppersdorf ("Gepper's village") was derived from the personal name of the lokator of the village. The Czech name was created in 1846, when the German letter "g" was replaced by similarly sounding Czech "kopř-", thus the new name was Kopřinov. The word "Kopřivnov" reminded the Czech word kopřiva (i.e. 'nettle'), so the name was changed to Kopřivná in 1924.

== Geography ==
Kopřivná is located about 9 kilometres (6 mi) north of Šumperk and 54 km (34 mi) northwest of Olomouc. It lies in the Hanušovice Highlands. The highest point is near the top of the hill Osikový vrch at 740 m (2,428 ft) above sea level. The eponymous stream Kopřivná originates here and flows across the municipality.

== History ==
The first written mention of Kopřivná is from 1414, where it is mentioned as a part of the Bludov estate.

The population was ethnically German until World War II. After the war, the German-speaking population was expelled and the village was partially resettled by Czechs.

== Demographics ==
Historical population

Year	Pop.	±%
1869	984	—
1880	1,103	+12.1%
1890	1,112	+0.8%
1900	1,092	−1.8%
1910	1,031	−5.6%

Year	Pop.	±%
1921	980	−4.9%
1930	1,007	+2.8%
1950	562	−44.2%
1961	442	−21.4%
1970	342	−22.6%

Year	Pop.	±%
1980	321	−6.1%
1991	297	−7.5%
2001	296	−0.3%
2011	261	−11.8%
2021	282	+8.0%

Source: Censuses

== Transport ==
The railway line Šumperk–Jeseník runs along the western municipal border, outside the built-up area. There are two train stations located outside the territory of Kopřivná.

== Sights ==
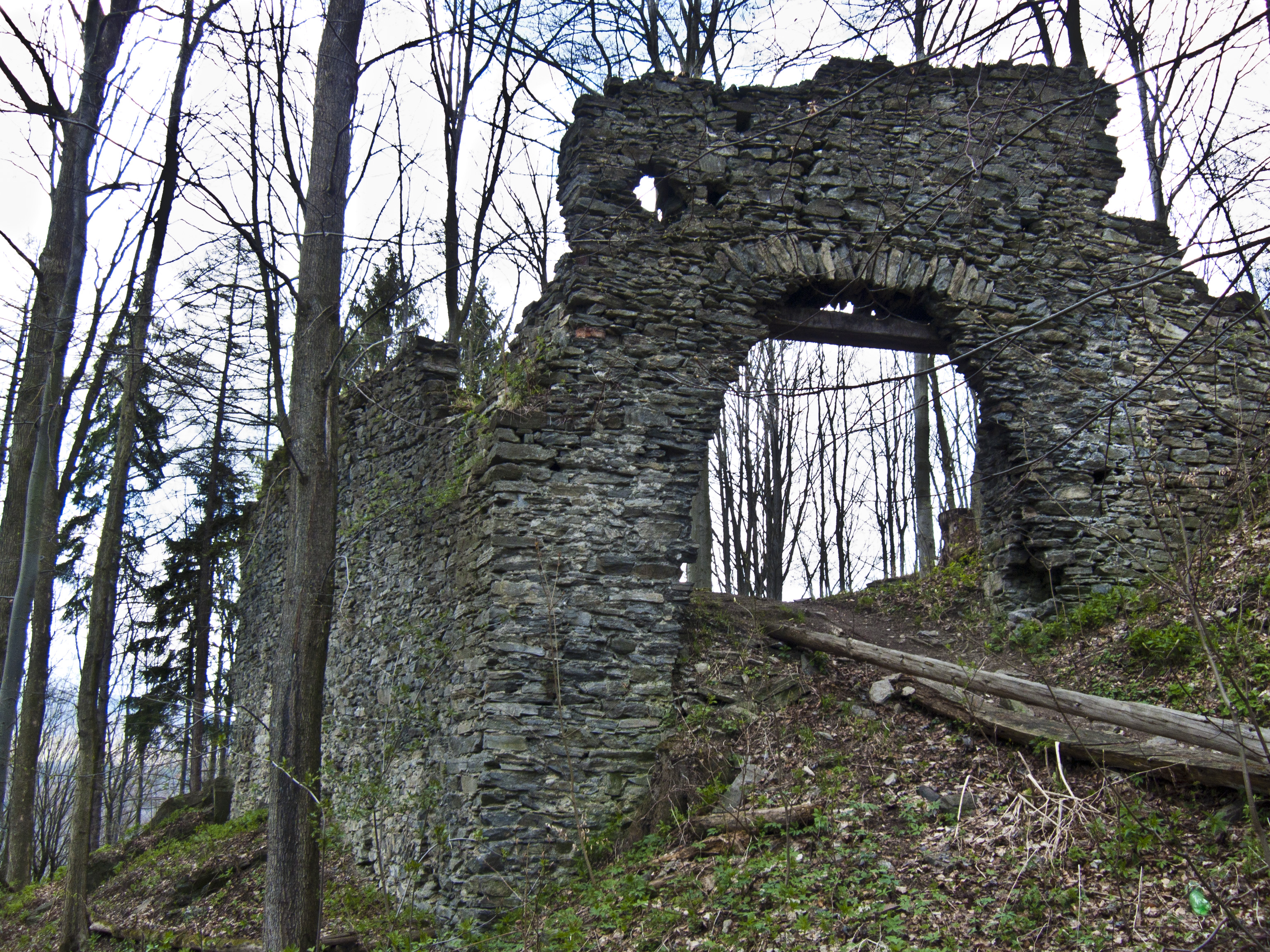
Ruins of Nový Hrad

The main landmark of Kopřivná is the Church of the Holy Trinity. The original church was first mentioned in 1594, but due to its poor condition, it was replaced by the current one in 1747.

Nový Hrad is a castle ruin in the woods in the western part of the territory. The castle was first mentioned in 1374, and it was referred to as abandoned in 1504. Remains of walls with prismatic bastions, moats, a cylindrical tower and fragments of a residential palace have been preserved from the original castle.
