= Deutsch (surname) =

- Language: German

Origin
- Meaning: German
- Region of origin: Germany

Other names
- Variant forms: Deutch; Deitch; Deich; Teutsch

Deutsch is a surname, meaning German in German. When transliterated to other languages, it may also be spelled as Deutch, Deitch, Deich, Teutsch.

== Deutsch ==
- Adam Deutsch (born 1995), Swedish ice hockey player
- Adolph Deutsch, Academy Award-winning composer
- Alex Deutsch, founder of Deutsch Group
- Alexander Deutsch, German planetologist (active since 1984)
- Alexander Nikolaevich Deutsch, Russian astronomer (active 1926–1985)
- Alina Deutsch, Romanian-American electronics engineer
- Alvin Deutsch, attorney
- Ana Deutsch (born 1940), psychologist and co-founder of the Program for Torture Victims
- André Deutsch, publisher in London
- Andrew Deutsch (born 1968), sound artist
- Armand Deutsch,
- Armelle Deutsch,
- Armin Joseph Deutsch (1918–1969), American astronomer and science fiction author
- Arnold Deutsch, NKVD operative who recruited Kim Philby
- Avraham Deutsch, Israeli politician
- Babette Deutsch (1895–1982), American author
- Barbu Nemțeanu (1887–1919), born Benjamin Deutsch, Romanian poet
- Beatie Deutsch (nee Rabin; born 1989), Haredi Jewish American-Israeli marathon runner
- Bence Deutsch,
- Boris Deutsch,
- Caroline Deutsch (1846–after 1903), German novelist
- Celia Deutsch,
- Chaim Deutsch, American politician
- Charles Deutsch, French engineer
- Charlie Deutsch,
- David Deutsch (born 1953), physicist
- David Deutsch (ad executive) (c. 1929 – 2013), American advertising executive
- Donny Deutsch,
- Diana Deutsch, British-born, American perceptual and cognitive psychologist
- Eliot Deutsch,
- Erik Deutsch,
- Ernst Deutsch (1890–1969), German actor
- Filip Deutsch (1828–1919), Croatian nobleman and industrialist
- Francine Deutsch,
- Fred Deutsch,
- George Deutsch, ex-NASA press officer
- Gerhard Deutsch,
- Gerti Deutsch,
- Gotthard Deutsch (1859–1921), scholar of Jewish history
- Gustav Deutsch,
- Hans Deutsch,
- Harold C. Deutsch (1904–1995), American historian and writer
- Harri Deutsch, (−2000), German publisher
- Heinz Deutsch (1920-1995) German WWII Assault Gun Officer and Knight's Cross of the Iron Cross Holder Fallschirm-Sturmgeschütz-Brigade 12
- Helen Deutsch,
- Helene Deutsch, Austrian-born American psychologist
- Helmut Deutsch (born 1945), Austrian classical pianist
- Herbert Deutsch (1932–2022), American composer
- Hubert Deutsch,
- Immanuel Oscar Menahem Deutsch (1829–1873), German oriental scholar
- Jan Deutsch,
- Joel Deutsch,
- John James Deutsch, Canadian economist
- Josef Deutsch,
- Josh Deutsch,
- Julio Deutsch (1859–1922), Croatian architect
- Julius Deutsch (1884–1968), Austrian politician
- Karl Deutsch (1912–1992), Czech social and political scientist
- Kevin Deutsch,
- Kurt Deutsch,
- Ladislas Deutsch, pen name of László Detre (1874–1939), Hungarian microbiologist
- Lea Deutsch (1927–1943), Croatian Jewish child actress who was murdered during the Holocaust
- Leo Deutsch (1855–1941) (known as Lev Deich in Russia), Russian revolutionary
- Linda Deutsch,
- Lindsay Deutsch,
- Lorànt Deutsch,
- Louis "Red" Deutsch (1890–1983), American boxer and owner of the "Tube Bar" in Jersey City
- L. Peter Deutsch, programmer and creator of the Ghostscript software
- Maria Deutsch,
- Mark Deutsch (musician), musician, inventor of bazantar
- Mark Deutsch (journalist) (Russian: Марк Дейч, also Deutch, Deich, Deitch, 1945–2012), Russian journalist
- Martin Deutsch, physicist, discoverer of positronium
- Martin Deutsch (psychologist) (1926–2002), American developmental psychologist
- Maury Deutsch,
- Max Deutsch, French-Austrian composer and director
- Mel Deutsch,
- Morton Deutsch (1920–2017), social psychologist and researcher in conflict resolution
- Naomi Deutsch,
- Nathaniel Deutsch,
- Niklaus Manuel Deutsch I (c. 1484–1530), Swiss artist
- Oscar Deutsch (1893–1941), founder of the British Odeon cinema chain
- Oskar Deutsch (born 1963), Austrian entrepreneur and President of the Jewish Community of Vienna
- Otto Erich Deutsch (1883–1967), Austrian musicologist and creator of the Deutsch catalogue of Schubert's compositions
- Patti Deutsch (1943–2017), 1970s game-show celebrity
- Peter Deutsch (born 1957), American politician
- Péter Deutsch (born 1968), Hungarian athlete
- Richard Deutsch,
- Robert Deutsch,
- Samuel Deutsch,
- Sándor Hatvany-Deutsch (1852–1913), Hungarian industrialist and art patron
- Sarah Deutsch,
- Seymon Deutsch (1935–2013), American bridge player
- Simion Deutsch,
- Simon Deutsch (1808–1877), Austrian Jewish writer and revolutionary
- Stephen Deutsch,
- Tamás Deutsch (swimmer),
- Tamás Deutsch (politician),
- Verlag Harri Deutsch,
- Walter Deutsch (1923–2025), Austrian musicologist
- Yaron Deutsch,

== Other spellings ==
- Fran Deitsch (1927–2011, married name Fran Landesman), American lyricist and poet
- Gene Deitch
- Kim Deitch
- Howard Deutch, film director
- John M. Deutch
- Madelyn Deutch, writer, director, actress and musician
- Zoey Deutch, actress and producer
- Georg Daniel Teutsch
- János Mattis-Teutsch
