= Gymnasium Wasagasse =

Coordinates: 48°13′00″N 16°21′42″E

Bundesgymnasium Wien IX
- Gymnasium Wasagasse
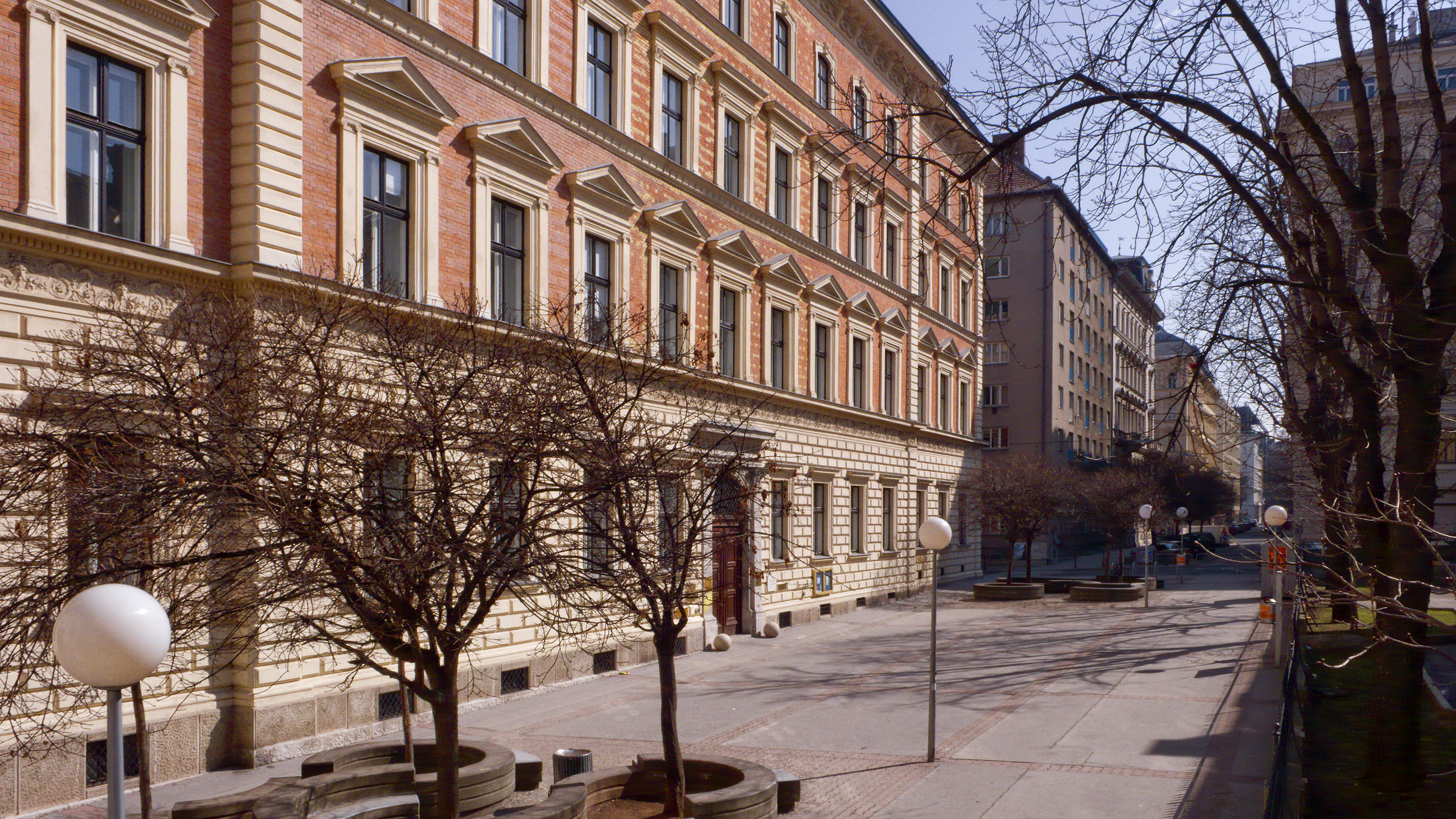

Location
- Wasagasse 10, 1090; Vienna; Austria

Information
- School type: Gymnasium (school)
- Founded: 1871
- Head of school: Mag. Johannes Bauer
- Teaching staff: ~80
- Website: www.bg9.at

The Gymnasium Wasagasse (Bundesgymnasium Wien IX, in short BG9) is a secondary school in Alsergrund, the 9th district of Vienna. Alumni of the school include two Nobel laureates, an Academy Award winner and many notable politicians, artists and scientists.

== History ==
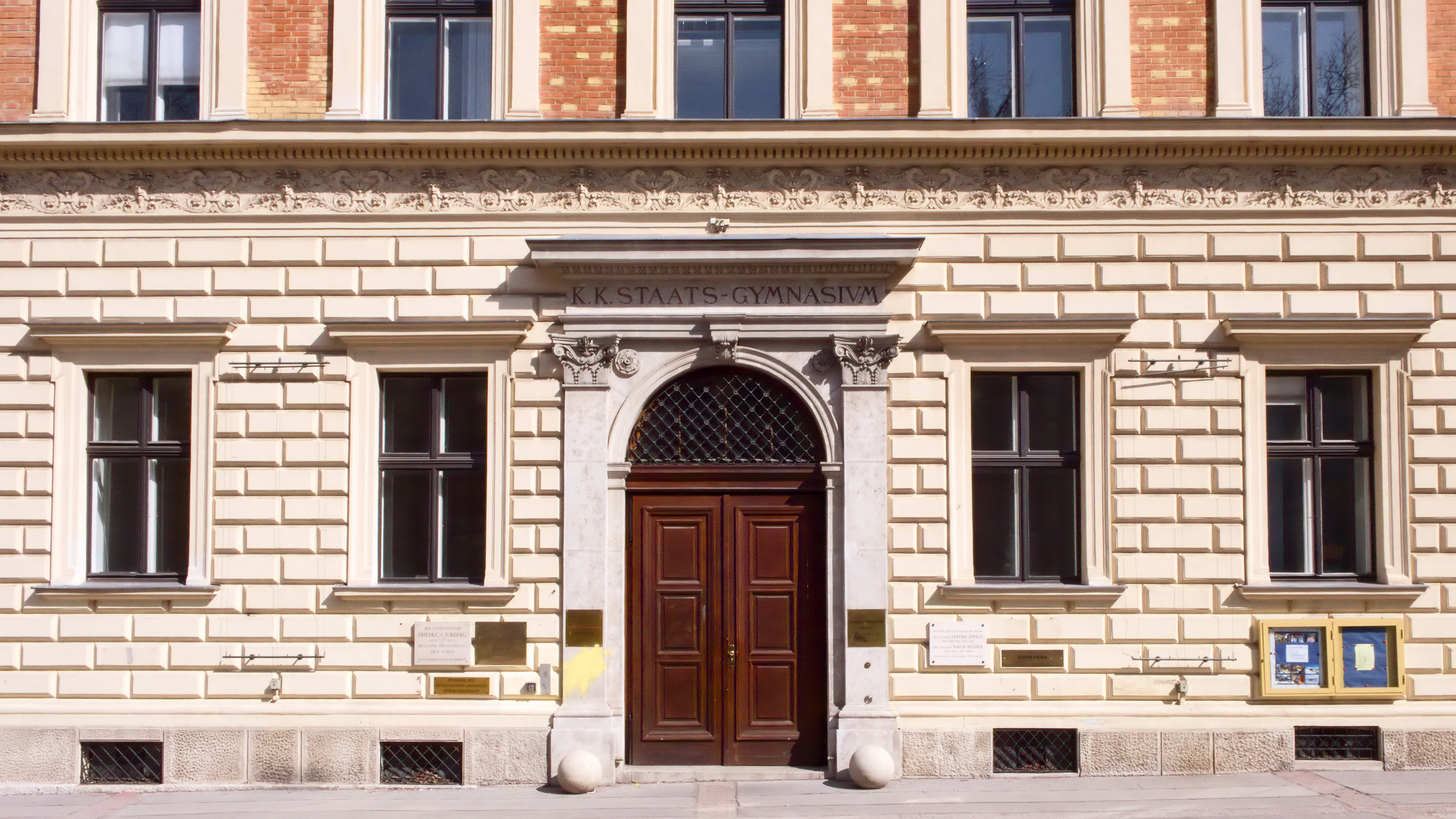
Main entrance of the school

Planned by Heinrich von Ferstel, the Wasagymnasium was built between 1869 and 1871 and was officially inaugurated on 16 October 1871.

For many decades the school was popular amongst the cultured Jewish bourgeoisie. In 1900, around 70% of the students were Jewish, whereas in 1938 there were only around 50% Jewish students. The Anschluss to the Third Reich put an end to this in 1938 and the school was relocated. Instead, the Gau administration of the Reichsgau Niederdonau used the school building as its headquarters. In the meanwhile, the Wasagymnasium used the school building of the Schottengymnasium, which was shut down by the Nazis, from 1938 until 1945.

In 2007, a group of students and their teacher organised a school project, called Erinnern (German for "Remember"), in order to research the fates of former Jewish students. Furthermore, the school also installed a commemorative plaque, honouring and remembering all the students and teachers who were victims of Nazism.

=== Today ===
Known as one of the most demanding schools in Austria, the Wasagymnasium offers a traditional humanistic education with a focus on classical languages as well as a focus on modern languages. Furthermore, the school also offers an education with an emphasis on science.

Its students regularly participate in different competitions, most notable the various language competitions in which the students of the Wasagymnasium were able to achieve many awards in the past few years. The University of Vienna cooperates with the Wasagymnasium and offers student teacher internships for its university students. Several teachers from the Wasagymnasium also teach at the University of Vienna.

The school building of the Wasagymnasium is also used by the educational centre for Chinese in Vienna. The Wasagymnasium has two gyms, one in the main school building and another bigger gym in a different building, located at Wasagasse 20, 1090 Vienna.

Since 2007, the Wasagymnasium is also the location of the Nox Latina, the long night of Latin, organised together with two other Viennese secondary schools and the University of Vienna.

== Famous former students of the Gymnasium Wasagasse ==
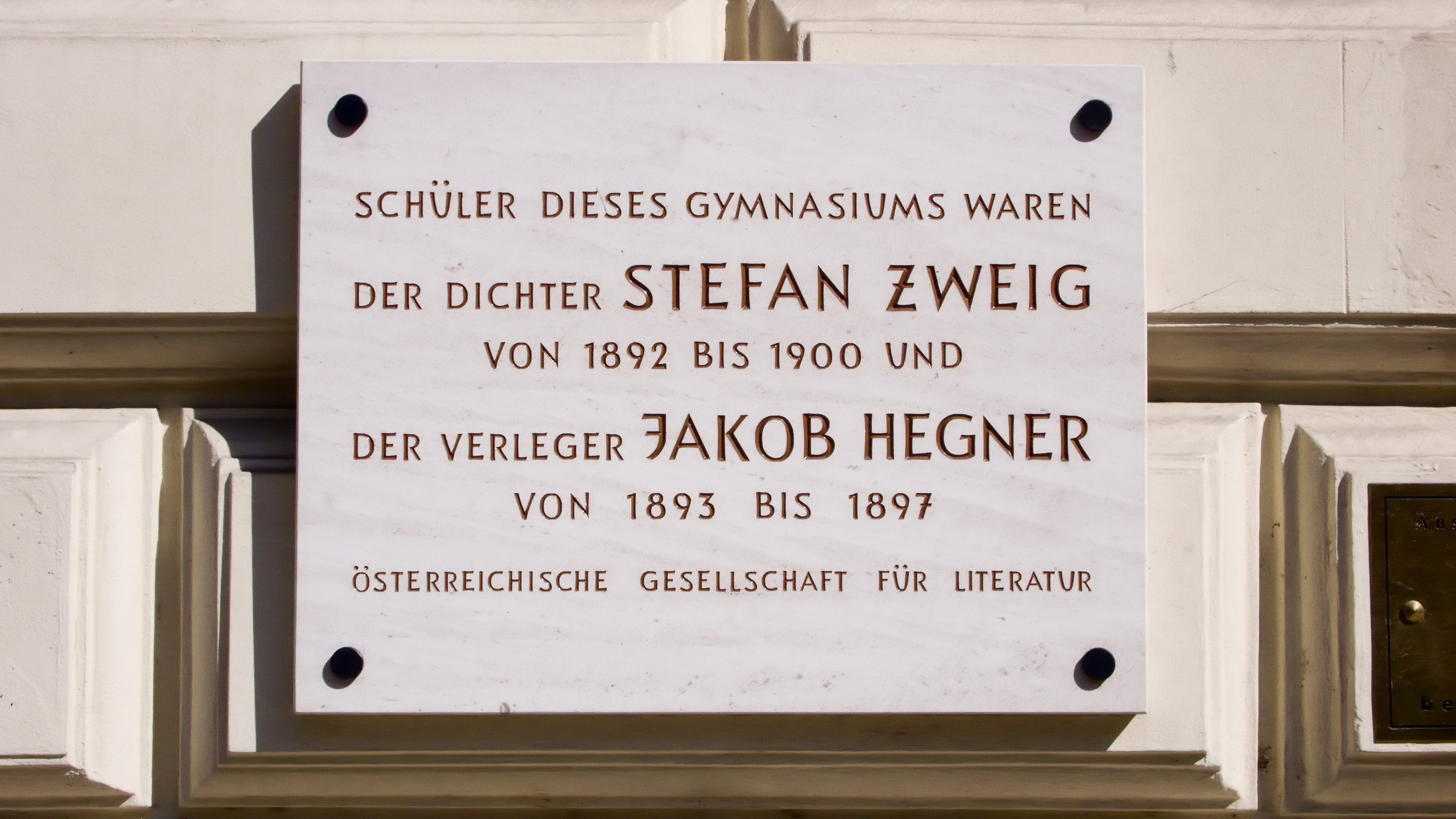
Memorial plaque outside of the school

=== Creative artists ===
- Andre Asriel (composer)
- Muhammad Asad † (journalist, diplomat, Islamic scholar, political theorist)
- Hans Gál † (composer)
- Fritz Stiedry † (conductor)
- Max Deutsch † (composer, conductor, teacher)
- Wilhelm Grosz † (composer, conductor)
- Heinz Politzer † (writer, literary critic)
- Felix Braun † (author, poet)
- Andrea Maria Dusl (film director, author)
- Georg Drozdowski † (author, journalist, translator, actor)
- Erich Fried † (poet, translator)
- Ernest Gold † (composer, Academy Award winner)
- Peter Hammerschlag † (poet, author, cabaret artist)
- Peter Nagy (TV director)
- Fritz Kalmar † (author)
- Gustav Glück † (art historian)
- Fritz Saxl † (art historian)
- Robert Eisler † (art historian)
- Robert Haas (calligrapher) †
- Ernst Décsey † (author, music critic)
- Eva-Maria Höhle (art historian)
- Emil Kaufmann † (art & architecture historian)
- Erich Kleiber † (conductor)
- Harry Seidler † (architect)
- Otto Leichter † (journalist, author)
- Felix Salten † (author)
- Heinrich Eduard Jacob † (journalist, author)
- Götz Spielmann (film director, script writer, Academy Award nominee)
- Marcel Prawy † ( dramaturg, opera connoisseur, opera critic)
- Heinrich Reif-Gintl † (opera and theatre manager, director of the Vienna State Opera)
- Friedrich Torberg † (author, journalist)
- Diego Viga † (physician, author)
- Stefan Zweig † (author)
- Paul Manelski † (musician)
- John Goldschmidt (film director, producer)

=== Scientists ===
- Karl Landsteiner † (biologist, physician, Nobel laureate)
- Richard Wettstein † (botanist)
- Felix Ehrenhaft † (physicist)
- Hans Benndorf † (physicist)
- Philipp Frank † (physicist, mathematician, philosopher)
- Eduard Helly † (mathematician)
- Erwin Chargaff † (biochemist)
- Julius Tandler † (physician, politician)
- Hermann von Schrötter † (physician, physiologist)
- Gerald Holton (Research Professor at Harvard University)
- Norbert Leser (jurist, political scientist and social philosopher)
- Felix Maria von Exner-Ewarten † (meteorologist, geophysicist)
- Ernst Kurth † (music theorist)
- Fritz Wittels † (psychoanalyst)
- Erich Manelski † (Chemist)

=== Other famous former students ===
- Helmut Krätzl (Auxiliary Bishop of Vienna)
- Ignaz Maybaum † (Jewish theologian)
- Emil Zsigmondy † (physician, mountaineer)
- Ari Rath (journalist, publicist, writer)
- Rainer Nowak (journalist, former editor of Die Presse)
- Henry Strakosch † (banker, businessman)
- Vincenz Hruby † (Czech chess master)
- Herbert Otto "Otti" Roth † (socialist, labourer, librarian and historian)
- Walter Breisky † (politician, former Vice-Chancellor of Austria and Chancellor of Austria)

== Famous teachers ==
- Friedrich Cerha † (composer, professor and conductor)
- Max Margules † (mathematician, physicist, and chemist)
- Karl Penka † (philologist, anthropologist)
- Hans Molisch † (botanist)
- Edgar Zilsel † (philosopher of science, historian)

== Literature ==
- Felix Czeike: Historisches Lexikon Wien. Verlag Kremayr & Scheriau, Wien 1997, ISBN 3-218-00547-7 (volume 5) {{.|589}}.
- Year books
