= 1148 Rarahu =

Main-belt asteroid

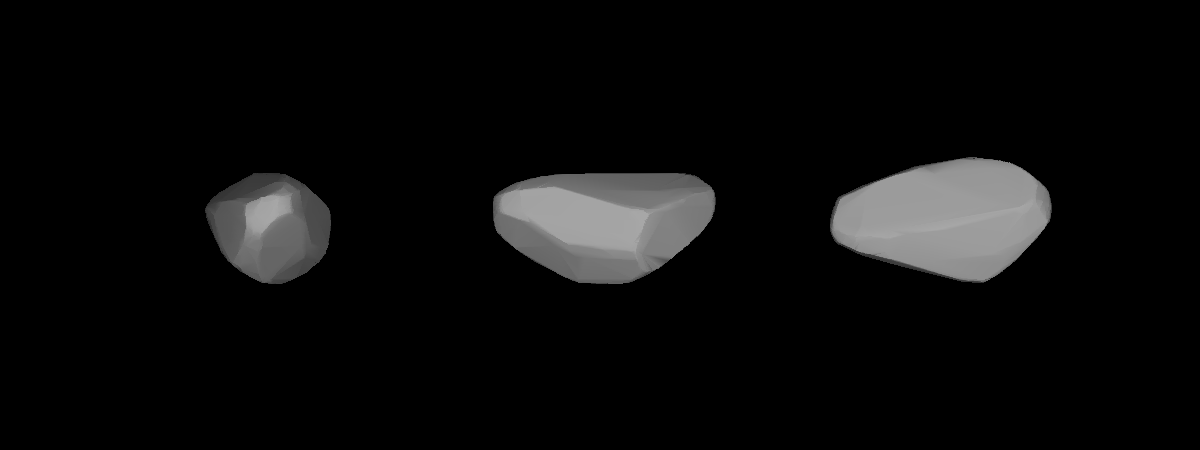
- Lightcurve-based 3D-model of Rarahu

Discovery
- Discovered by: A. Deutsch
- Discovery site: Simeiz Obs.
- Discovery date: 5 July 1929

Designations
- Named after: Rarahu (based on a French novel by Pierre Loti)
- Alternative designations: 1929 NA · A924 OA
- Minor planet category: main-belt · (outer); Eos

Orbital characteristics
- Epoch 4 September 2017 (JD 2458000.5)
- Uncertainty parameter 0
- Observation arc: 87.98 yr (32,135 days)
- Aphelion: 3.3477 AU
- Perihelion: 2.6909 AU
- Semi-major axis: 3.0193 AU
- Eccentricity: 0.1088
- Orbital period (sidereal): 5.25 yr (1,916 days)
- Mean anomaly: 278.28°
- Mean motion: 0° 11^{m} 16.44^{s} / day
- Inclination: 10.827°
- Longitude of ascending node: 145.43°
- Argument of perihelion: 174.80°

Physical characteristics
- Dimensions: 26.311±0.283 km 27.512±0.371 km 32.81±0.56 km 33.23±2.9 km 49.11±0.64 km
- Synodic rotation period: 6.54±0.05 h 6.54448±0.00002 h (Note: Hanus, J.; Delbo, M.; Ali-Lagoa, V.; Bolin, B.; et al. (2016) Astron. Astrophys., submitted. Modeled lightcurve of (1148) Rarahu with sidereal rotation period 6.54448±0.00002 hours and poles at (146.0°, −2.0°) and (326.0°, −2.0°). Summary figures at the LCDB); 6.54449±0.00005 h 6.5447±0.0006 h
- Geometric albedo: 0.064±0.015; 0.1393±0.028; 0.177±0.007; 0.2205±0.0616
- Spectral type: Tholen = S SMASS = K B–V = 0.868; U–B = 0.444
- Absolute magnitude (H): 10.15 · 10.46±0.35

1148 Rarahu, provisional designation 1929 NA and previously also known as 1148 Raraju, (Note: The following statement from the IAU General Assembly was published in the Minor Planet Circular on 27 December 1985, quote:"Note on the name of (1148). Following discussions among the parties involved, it was affirmed that erroneous transliteration (from French to Russian to German) caused the name of this minor planet to be spelled incorrectly in the A.N. (when the name was introduced), recent editions of the EMP and other standard references. The explanation of the name in "The Names of the Minor Planets" (Cincinnati 1955, 1968) is correct, and henceforth the original French spelling, RARAHU (not Raraju), is to be used.") is an Eoan asteroid from the outer regions of the asteroid belt, approximately 32 kilometers in diameter. Discovered by Alexander Deutsch at the Simeiz Observatory in 1929, the asteroid's name was taken from a French novel by Pierre Loti.

== Discovery ==
Rarahu was discovered on 5 July 1929, by Soviet astronomer Alexander Deutsch at the Simeiz Observatory on the Crimean peninsula. On July 28, it was independently discovered by Cyril Jackson and Harry Wood at Johannesburg Observatory in South Africa. The Minor Planet Center only recognizes the first discoverer.

== Orbit and classification ==
Rarahu is a member the Eos family (606), the largest asteroid family of the outer main belt, named after its parent body, the asteroid 221 Eos. The family consists of nearly 10,000 asteroids.

It orbits the Sun at a distance of 2.7–3.3 AU once every 5 years and 3 months (1,916 days; semi-major axis of 3.02 AU). Its orbit has an eccentricity of 0.11 and an inclination of 11° with respect to the ecliptic. The asteroid was first observed as A924 OA at Simeiz Observatory in July 1924. The body's observation arc begins at Johannesburg in July 1929, one week after its official discovery observation at Simeiz.

== Physical characteristics ==
In the Tholen classification, Rarahu is a stony S-type asteroid. In the SMASS classification it is a K-type asteroid, which is a refined spectral type to which most members of the Eos family, including the parent body, belong to.

=== Rotation period ===
Between 2002 and 2011, three rotational lightcurves of Rarahu were obtained from photometric observations by French amateur astronomers René Roy, Laurent Brunetto and Pierre Antonini. Lightcurve analysis gave a consolidated rotation period of 6.5447 hours with a brightness amplitude between 0.05 and 0.94 magnitude (U=3-).

=== Spin axis ===
The asteroid's lightcurve has also been modeled several times and gave a concurring period of 6.54448 and 6.54449 hours, respectively. The body's spin axis has also been determined to be at (146.0°, −2.0°) and (326.0°, −2.0°) in ecliptic coordinates (λ, β).

=== Diameter and albedo ===
According to the surveys carried out by the Infrared Astronomical Satellite IRAS, the Japanese Akari satellite and the NEOWISE mission of NASA's Wide-field Infrared Survey Explorer, Rarahu measures between 26.311 and 49.11 kilometers in diameter and its surface has an albedo between 0.064 and 0.2205.

The Collaborative Asteroid Lightcurve Link adopts the results obtained by IRAS, that is, an albedo of 0.1393 and a diameter of 33.23 kilometers based on an absolute magnitude of 10.15.

== Naming ==
This minor planet's name was taken from the novel Le mariage de Loti (Loti's Marriage; 1880) by French novelist and naval officer Pierre Loti (1850–1923). The Polynesian idyll was originally titled "Rarahu", which is the Tahitian name for a girl. The official naming citation that already correctly spelled the asteroid's name (see below) was mentioned in The Names of the Minor Planets by Paul Herget in 1955 (H 107).

=== Wrong spelling ===
In the original publication, the German journal Astronomische Nachrichten incorrectly spelled this minor planet's name as "Raraju" rather than "Rarahu", which is the original French spelling, due to an error in the transliteration process from French to Russian and then to German. The officially corrected name was published by the Minor Planet Center on 27 December 1985 (M.P.C. 10194).
