= Adam Deutsch =

Swedish ice hockey player

- Born: May 22, 1995 (age 31) Gävle, Sweden
- Height: 6 ft 0 in (183 cm)
- Weight: 190 lb (86 kg; 13 st 8 lb)
- Position: Defence
- Shoots: Left
- Hockeyettan team Former teams: Strömsbro IF; Brynäs IF; KHL Medveščak Zagreb; Nottingham Panthers
- NHL draft: Undrafted
- Playing career: 2015–present

Adam Deutsch (born May 22, 1995) is a Swedish professional ice hockey defenceman. He is currently playing for Strömsbro IF in the Swedish Hockeyettan. Deutsch was previously with the Nottingham Panthers of the Elite Ice Hockey League (EIHL).

== Playing career ==
Deutsch made his Swedish Hockey League debut playing with Brynäs IF during the 2014–15 SHL season. After appearing in 7 post-season games with Brynäs IF, in which he recorded hid first two SHL points on assists, Deutsch opted to sign a try-out with Croatian KHL entrant Medveščak Zagreb on July 3, 2015. On August 17, 2015, Deutsch secured a one-year contract for the 2015–16 season in Zagreb. He saw the ice in 20 KHL contests for Zagreb during the 2015-16 season.

Deutsch headed back to his native Sweden for the 2016-17 campaign, signing with Almtuna IS of the second-tier Allsvenskan.

On July 2, 2019, Deutsch opted to continue his career abroad, agreeing to a one-year contract with English club, Nottingham Panthers of the EIHL.

On September 11, 2020, Deutsch returned to Sweden with Hockeyettan side Strömsbro IF, joining up with his brothers David and Gabriel.
