= Alexander Deutsch =

Soviet astronomer (1899–1986)

Asteroids discovered: 1
1148 Rarahu	July 5, 1929	MPC

Alexander Nikolaevich Deutsch (Russian: Александр Николаевич Дейч, romanized: Aleksandr Nikolayevich Deych; December 31, 1899 – 22 November 1986) was a Soviet astronomer who worked at Pulkovo Observatory.

== Biography ==
Deutsch was born in the night from December 31, 1899, to January 1, 1900, in the Bessarabian town of Reni into a family of Volga German (on his father's side), Greek, and Romanian (on his mother's side) descent. When he was a small child, the family moved to Ryazan and then to Saratov. He was graduated from Saint Petersburg University. He was an adjoint director of the Pulkovo Observatory prior to World War II and the director of the Pulkovo Observatory during the blockade of Leningrad. Subsequently, he was the head of the astrometry section of the Pulkovo Observatory and the founder of the astrometric school of that observatory.

He was active from 1935 to 1985 as A. N. Deutsch (A. Deutsch published starting in 1926 and could be the same person). He discovered one asteroid (the Minor Planet Center lists him as A. Deutsch).

His main scientific contributions refer to stars' proper motions in selected Kapteyn surfaces, astrophotography of galaxies and stars, brown dwarfs, astronomical calculations of the coordinates of warships, eclipses and asteroids photography. A number of papers were signed as Deich. Deutsch (Deich) was a president of the IAU Astrometry commission. The asteroid Reni, discovered by L. S. Chernyh, was named in honor of A. N. Deutsch (Deich).

== Papers ==
- ADS NASA
