= Alina Deutsch =

American electronics engineer

Alina Deutsch is a Romanian-American electronics engineer who worked for many years at Thomas J. Watson Research Center on topics including interconnects for Very Large Scale Integration.

== Education and career ==
Deutsch is originally from Bucharest. She graduated from Columbia University with an electrical engineering degree in 1971, and joined IBM in the same year. She earned a master's degree from Syracuse University in 1976, and retired in 2009.

She was named a Fellow of the IEEE in 1999, "for contributions to the design of practical lossy transmission line structures for digital and communication applications".

== Other activities ==
Deutsch is the translator of Sanda Marin's Traditional Romanian Cooking, a widely used Romanian cookbook by Sanda Marin. Her translation was published in 1996 by Black Sea Publications.

In her retirement she became an amateur impressionist painter, and moved from Westchester County, New York to Houston, Texas.
