= Kevin Deutsch =

American journalist and author

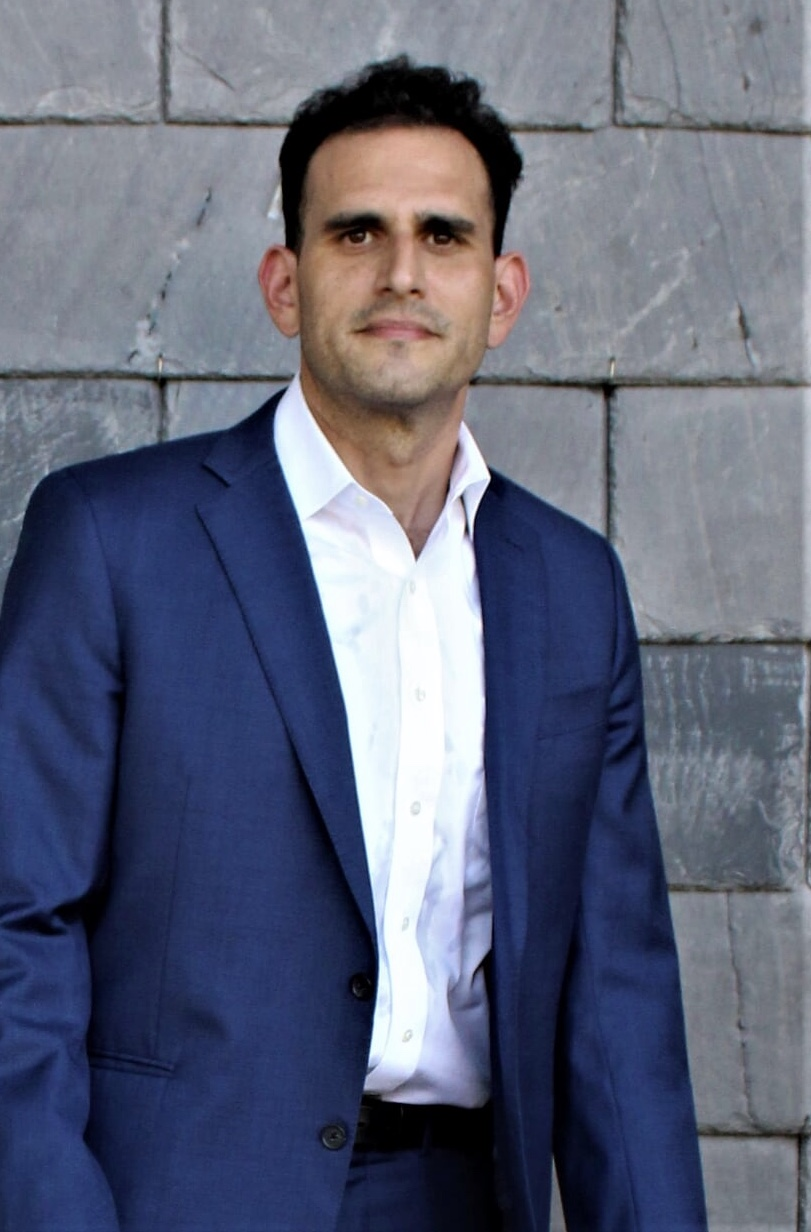
Kevin Deutsch in the Bronx, New York, July 2020

Kevin Deutsch is an American criminal justice journalist and author. He is the author of Pill City, an account of how two teens used opioids looted during the 2015 Baltimore riots to sell drugs using an Uber-like app and found a nationwide criminal syndicate. The sourcing and veracity of some of his news articles and his book Pill City became the subject of a high-profile dispute in 2017, involving allegations that Deutsch repeatedly fabricated sources, quotes, and events. Deutsch denied the claims and defended his work as accurate, as did his publisher, St. Martin's Press.

== Career ==
=== Journalism ===
Deutsch is the Jewish communities and general assignment reporter for Talk Media. He worked as a breaking news and police reporter at the Miami Herald from 2003 to 2005. He worked at the Daily News from 2009 to 2012, followed by law enforcement reporting for Newsday until 2016. He has also worked as a staff writer at The Riverdale Press and The Palm Beach Post. He was hired as a reporter by New Mexico's the Rio Grande Sun in 2022. He worked as a staff writer at The Miami Times in 2023.

=== Author ===
Deutsch's first book, The Triangle: A Year on the Ground with New York's Bloods and Crips (2014), is an account of the year the author spent covering a gang war between the Bloods and the Crips on Long Island. It received positive reviews from critics, including a starred review from Publishers Weekly magazine. His second book, Pill City: How Two Honor Roll Students Foiled the Feds and Built a Drug Empire (2017), chronicles the story of how opiates stolen during the Baltimore riots sparked a wave of inner-city addiction and violence.

== Questions about sources ==
Following the release of Deutsch's second book, Pill City, reporters from The Baltimore Sun and Baltimore City Paper challenged the book's veracity. On February 10, 2017, The Baltimore Sun published an article quoting government officials that cast doubt on the book and Deutsch's practice of changing the names of individuals and places he documented. Core elements of the book could not be substantiated, including "the dates, circumstances and victims involved in homicides Deutsch describes in detail". The City Paper was not able to confirm the existence of almost any person described in the book, including incidental characters not involved in crime who would have no reason to fear exposure. Despite a detailed explanation of events in the trauma department at the University of Maryland Medical Center, no record exists of Deutsch visiting it. Of the murders described in the book, several did not appear to match any of the Baltimore area's recorded murders during the year-long time period. The City Paper, despite inquiring with both the police and other experts on the Baltimore underworld, was unable to verify the existence of characters who might possibly have been analogues for "old-school drug kingpin Jimmy Masters" nor a "nationally famous" Reverend Grier, despite a detailed description of a high-profile and well-attended funeral for Grier in the book.

The Baltimore Sun article also included an extended video interview with Deutsch, in which he defended his work and his use of anonymous sourcing, which he said was needed to protect the interviewees' safety. The "Author's Note" in Deutsch's book includes a section detailing his methodology. It states that "In order to disguise the identities of interviewees, most of their names have been changed. For that same reason, certain locations, physical descriptions, and other identifying details have been altered or obscured".

Within a week of the Baltimore Sun story, both Newsday and The New York Times announced separate internal reviews of Deutsch's past writing. Baltimore TV writer/producer David Simon said "After reading, I think this book is, by and large, a wholesale fabrication."

On February 24, 2017, The New York Times published an editor's note on the sole article Deutsch wrote for the paper, detailing its investigation and conclusion:

In response [to questions about the reliability of Pill City], editors and reporters at The Times conducted a detailed review of the fentanyl article [written by freelancer Kevin Deutsch in 2016]. The article's main facts and thrust, including the official data and quotes from the authorities, were confirmed. However, after extensive reporting efforts, The Times also has been unable to locate or confirm the existence of two people who were named and quoted: Jeffrey Sheridan, described as a resident of Oyster Bay, N.Y., who works as an addiction counselor and whose 34-year-old nephew died from a fentanyl overdose on Staten Island in 2015; and Andrew Giordano, described as a 26-year-old resident of Prospect Heights, Brooklyn, who overdosed on a fentanyl-heroin mixture. Mr. Deutsch maintains that the interviews and the descriptions are accurate. But he has not been able to put The Times in contact with either source, or to provide any further material to corroborate the account. At this point, editors have concluded that The Times cannot vouch for the accuracy of those sources, and that material has been removed from the online version of the article.

On March 2, 2017, the media watchdog group iMediaEthics confirmed that the New York Daily News was conducting an internal review, examining all 572 stories from Deutsch's career with the company. The group later shared a statement from Newsweek, confirming that it would review the three stories Deutsch had written there as well. The New York Daily News review was less extensive than the Newsday review and noted the impossibility of verifying five-to-seven-year-old stories that were often written under multiple bylines after staff turnover, but did not find any obvious "red flags" in its review. Deutsch has stood by all of his reporting, stating that he used the exact names given to him by his interviewees.

On July 12, 2017, Newsday, where Deutsch had been on staff for more than four years, released the conclusions of its review of Deutsch's writing there. Newsday said that the review was prompted by the Baltimore article questioning Deutsch's second book. Newsday found that in 77 of more than 600 articles written by Deutsch, 109 individuals he quoted could not have their existence confirmed. The editors said the main points of the articles were confirmed and cited many reasons that people might not give a real name to a police reporter. No corrections were issued, but Newsday appended individual editor's notes to each of the 77 articles online, detailing which sources it could not locate after approximately four months of effort.

Deutsch issued a statement on his website stating: "For me, journalistic ethics are sacrosanct. They've remained so throughout my fifteen-year criminal justice journalism career—a career I'm extremely proud of. I stand behind every word I've published. None of my work has been found to be inaccurate, nor any story I've worked on ever retracted. Newsday's review confirmed the accuracy of the more than 630 stories I wrote for the paper--stories Newsday is standing behind." Deutsch has also suggested that his competitors are simply jealous of his work.

Articles in The Washington Post and Rolling Stone both noted that Deutsch had worked for news organizations for years before sourcing allegations surfaced, and hypothesized that Deutsch's coverage of marginalized communities meant he faced less accountability. Such sources are more difficult to track down, and readers are happy to accept information that fits their expectations. David Simon was more blunt; he wrote, "Nobody is going to fact check poor black people. That's the bottom line... you can say anything you want about the black underclass."
