= Sarah Deutsch =

American attorney

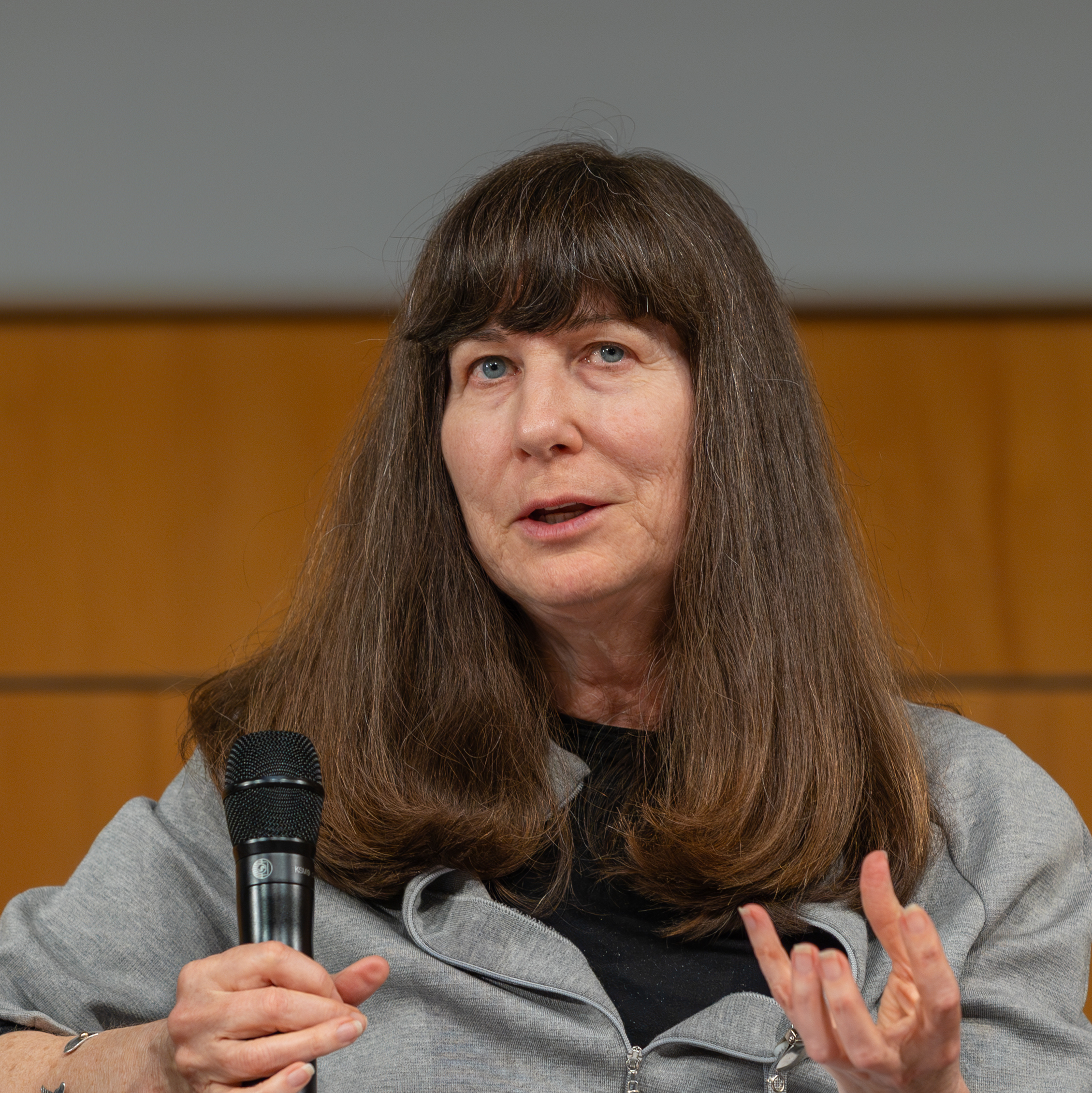
- in 2025
- Born: Sarah Beth Deutsch; January 3, 1961 (age 64); Brooklyn, New York
- Education: Emory University (BA); American University (JD)
- Occupation(s): lawyer, business executive

Sarah Beth Deutsch (born January 3, 1961, in Brooklyn, New York) is an American attorney who was Vice President and Deputy General Counsel of the telecommunications company Verizon Communications until her retirement in 2015. Since leaving Verizon, she is a practicing attorney in the Washington, D.C., area handling copyright, trademark, privacy and internet policy issues.

== Education ==
She holds a J.D. from American University, Washington College of Law and a B.A. from Emory University.

In the Spring of 2019, Deutsch began teaching as a Lecturer on Law at Harvard Law School where she is teaching a class on digital privacy.

== Intellectual Property and Internet Policy Work ==
Before joining Verizon she was an associate in the law firm of Morgan, Lewis and Bockius.

Until her retirement in 2015, Sarah Deutsch was Vice President and Deputy General Counsel at Verizon Communications, where she spent over 23 years in the legal department. She was responsible for Verizon's global IP practice, including copyrights, trademarks, patent licensing, and unfair competition. In the course of her career, Sarah also managed Verizon's privacy practice, and worked on a broad set of global intellectual property policy issues, including Internet policy, online liability, and advocacy.

Deutsch gained media attention for representing Verizon in the copyright case RIAA v. Verizon, in which the Recording Industry Association of America obtained a subpoena demanding Verizon to disclose the identity of several subscribers who were allegedly engaged in illegal P2P file-sharing.

In the end, the D.C. Circuit Court ruled in favor of Verizon. The decision was authored by Chief Judge Douglas Ginsburg. She is also known for fighting for consumers’ rights in serving as a representative of the telecommunications industry in negotiations that lead to the passage of the DMCA. For her work in support of technology users, she received Public Knowledge's President's Award for Extraordinary Dedication to Protecting the Free Flow of Information Over the Internet in 2009.

== National Center for Health Research ==
Since 2013, Deutsch serves on the board of the National Center for Health Research. The National Center for Health Research is a non-profit think tank based in Washington, D.C., and uses objective, research-based information to encourage new, more effective programs and policies that promote the health and safety of women, children, and families.

== Electronic Frontier Foundation ==
On December 22, 2015, the Electronic Frontier Foundation (EFF) announced that Deutsch had rejoined its board of directors. She previously had served on the EFF Board from 2005-2006.

== ICANN ==
On September 1, 2017, it was announced that Deutsch had been nominated to the board of ICANN.
