= Diego Viga =

Ecuadorian university teacher and writer (1907–1997)

- Born: Paul Engel; Vienna, Austria-Hungary
- Died: Quito, Ecuador

Diego Viga (7 June 1907, Vienna, Austria-Hungary - 27 August 1997, Quito, Ecuador) was an Ecuadorian physician and writer of Austrian origin.

== Life ==
Diego Viga, born Paul Engel, was the son of the textile manufacturer Julius Engel and Klara Rosenfeld. From 1918, he attended the Viennese humanistic Wasagasse High School. After the Abitur in 1926, he began studying medicine at the University of Vienna. During his higher semesters he mainly dealt with biochemistry and published a number of articles on his research in this field. Later he moved to the Institute of General and Experimental Pathology, where he mainly worked on endocrinological issues and specifically researched the role of the human epiphysis. In February 1933, he received his doctorate in Vienna as a doctor of medicine.

After completing his doctorate, Viga practiced as a surgeon at the Vienna General Hospital with the aim of establishing himself as a gynecologist; at the same time, he continued his hormone research. After the suppression of workers' uprisings by Federal Chancellor Engelbert Dollfuss in February 1934 and a failed National Socialist coup attempt in July had worsened domestic political conditions, especially for Austrian Jews, Viga decided to go abroad for a time. He applied for a position in the Uruguayan capital Montevideo and traveled by ship across the Mediterranean and Atlantic to South America. In Montevideo he worked in an endocrinological laboratory. In October 1935, he and his long-time girlfriend Josefine Monath, who had stayed behind in Vienna, entered into a long-distance marriage before a rabbi. Hopes of bringing his wife to Uruguay were dashed, and Viga returned to Austria in early 1936. He found a job at the Vienna University Hospital as an assistant doctor for gynecology, continued his hormone research there and published further articles in scientific journals. After the annexation of Austria to the German Reich in March 1938, Viga’s position in Austria became untenable. He accepted an offer from a Hungarian pharmaceutical company and traveled by ship to South America, where he was to work as a pharmaceutical representative.

In May 1938, Diego Viga arrived in Colombia. He worked as a medical representative in the capital Bogotá. With the help of local researchers, he was able to continue his research on sex hormones. From July 1938, he was an associate professor of endocrinology at the Universidad Libre in Bogotá. During the following year, after overcoming many obstacles, his wife Josefine, his brother Walter with his wife, and his parents also came into Colombian exile. At the beginning of 1939, Viga took over the chair of biology at the Universidad Libre in Bogotá. At the same time, he became a representative of a U.S. pharmaceutical company, for which he undertook extensive business trips through Colombia, Venezuela, Ecuador, and Panama. During these travels, Viga began writing essays and first attempts at fiction. In Bogotá he met the anti-fascist exile author Erich Arendt, who strongly influenced him in his literary work and Marxist worldview. From 1941 onwards, in addition to his academic work, Viga wrote novels and short stories in German and Spanish, in which he processed the experiences of both his Austrian years and his South American travels.

At the beginning of 1945, Viga gave up his travel career and took a position as a research assistant at the “Laboratorios Hormona”, run by his former Hungarian employer in Bogotá. Viga refused to return to Austria after the end of World War II. He took on further teaching duties, among others in pharmacology at the Colombian Universidad Nacional. From 1950, Viga worked as a scientific advisor for an Ecuadorian pharmaceutical company, for which he worked in Quito from 1950 to 1955; shortly thereafter, the entire family moved to Ecuador. In 1955, Viga published his first fiction work, the novel The Knight of Freedom, like all his literary works under the pseudonym “Diego Viga” at the East German Paul List publishing house.

After Viga lost his job as a pharmacologist, the author kept to himself, who was a passionate mountaineer, worked as a representative of an export company for tropical woods in the high mountain region around Chimborazo. These experiences later flowed into his narrative works. In 1958, Viga gave a series of philosophical lectures at the Ecuadorian State University and was given the opportunity to make his first trip to the Galápagos Islands. Around the same time he received a professorship for biology and general pathology at the Universidad Central in Quito; from 1961 he practiced as a specialist in endocrinology in the Ecuadorian capital. In the 1960s, Viga received several literary prizes in Ecuador, and in 1972 and 1977 he was awarded by the GDR, in which his German-language works were published exclusively, with the Badge of Honour of the League for Friendship of Peoples.

== Works ==
=== Stories ===
- El diagnostic. 16 cuentos de 3 dêcadas. Casa de la Cultura Ecuadoriana, Quito 1969.
- Las pecas de mama. seis cuentos. Editorial Minerva, Quito 1970.
- Cuentos. Casa de la Cultura Ecuadoriana, Guayaquil 1978.

=== Novels ===
- The Knight of Freedom: A story of the development of an older gentleman. Leipzig: List-Verlag. 1955.
- Fate under the mango tree. Leipzig: List-Verlag. 1957.
- The Seven Lives of Wenceslao Perilla. List-Verlag, Leipzig 1958.
- The Sacrificed Farmer List-Verlag, Leipzig 1959.
- The Indians List-Verlag, Leipzig 1960.
- Weapons and cocoa List-Verlag, Leipzig 1961.
- The strange journey of the seagull List-Verlag, Leipzig 1964.
- Eva Heller. Quito: Editorial Universitas. 1966.
- The parallels intersect List-Verlag, Leipzig 1969. New edition udT The apolitical ones. Edition Atelier, Vienna 2022.
- La viuda de Soto. Quito: Casa de la Cultura Ecuadoriana. 1971.
- Station in Esmeraldas List-Verlag, Leipzig 1973.
- The conquistadors List-Verlag, Leipzig 1975.
- The lots of San Bartolomé List-Verlag, Leipzig 1977.
- World tour to the jungle. Halle/Saale: Mitteldeutscher Verlag. 1979.
- The Lost Year Mitteldeutscher Verlag, Halle/Saale 1980.
- Promotion without a chance Mitteldeutscher Verlag, Halle/Saale 1982.
- Prosecutor of Socrates: Novel from ancient Athens. Halle/Saale: Mitteldeutscher Verlag. 1987. ISBN 3-354-00165-8.

=== Plays ===
- Sanatorio para nerviosos. 4 pieces en un acto. Editorial Universitas, Quito 1967.

=== Non-fiction books ===
- Evolución filogenética emergente. Commemoración del centenario de la publicación por Charles Darwin „El origen de las especies“. Quito: Editorial Universitas. 1958.; with José D. Paltán and José A. Homs
- Visión de la filosofía en el sigo XX. Quito: Editorial Universitas. 1958.
- El eterno dilemma. 4 moments of the history of the espíritu. Editorial Universitas, Quito 1964.
- Shakespeare in his cuatricentenario. Cuenca 1964.
- Los sueños de Cándido. Editorial Universitas, Quito 1968.
- Algunas deliberaciones sobre arte. Ciencia y literatura. Editorial Universitas, Quito 1972.
- Punto de salida, punto de llegada. Editorial Universitas, Quito 1977.
- Reflecting on the living. Urania-Verlag, Leipzig 1977.
- Las Islas Galápagos y la teoría de Darwin. Quito 1981.
- Catorce ensayos. Editorial Su Liberia, Quito 1985 (Breves ensayos de cultura general; Volume 3).
- Mauricio Toledana en espejo cóncavo. Editorial El Conejo, Quito 1987.
