= Caroline Deutsch =

German novelist

- Born: 23 February 1846; Namesto, Kingdom of Hungary
- Occupation: Novelist
- Writing career
- Language: German

Caroline Deutsch (23 February 1846 – after 1903) was a German novelist.

== Biography ==
Caroline Deutsch was born in Namesto, a small Hungarian village, on 23 February 1846. Her father, a rabbi, was German in culture, and the German language and spirit prevailed in the family. While still very young, Caroline began to write poetry, some appearing in Berlin newspapers. In 1870 she graduated from Lina Morgenstern's academy as a public teacher, obtaining at the same time a permanent position on the Jüdische Presse of Berlin. She published several novelettes in the Berlin Volkszeitung, and later wrote chiefly for the Hamburger Nachrichten.

In 1875 she married in Hungary, and moved from there to Hamburg. Although her legal name was Caroline Weiss, she continued to write under her former name.

The scenes of Deutsch's novels are mostly laid in Hungary, and she vividly describes the life of the Hungarian peasant and small tradesman. Her story Gedaljah, originally published in Die jüdische Presse (1906), appeared in Hebrew and Ladino translations.

== Publications ==
- Über Klippen. Vol. 1–2. Dresden: C. Reissner. 1894. A novel.
- Aus Drang und Noth. Jüdische Universal-Bibliothek. Prague: J. B. Brandeis. 1897.
- Ein edles Frauenleben. Charlottenburg: A. Michow. 1898.
- Erzählungen (I. Besiegt. Die Tochter der Hirtin. II Hanka.). Vol. 1–2. Hamburg: O. Meissner. 1880.
- In letzter Stunde. Leipzig: P. Braun. 1897.
- Der Oberstuhlrichter. 1903.
- Das Geheimnis der Familie Lavadis. Berlin: Globus Verlag. 1918.
