= Heinrich Reif-Gintl =

Heinrich Reif-Gintl (7 October 1900, in Vienna – 13 July 1974, in Vienna) was an Austrian opera manager and theatre director.

Reif-Gintl began his career in theater administration in 1923. He directed the Vienna Staatsoper for four years, beginning in 1968.
