= Hubert Deutsch =

Austrian conductor and administrator (1925–2018)

Hubert Deutsch (3 May 1925 – 16 June 2018) was an Austrian conductor and administrator closely connected to the Vienna State Opera.
