= Vienna State Opera =

Opera house in Vienna, Austria

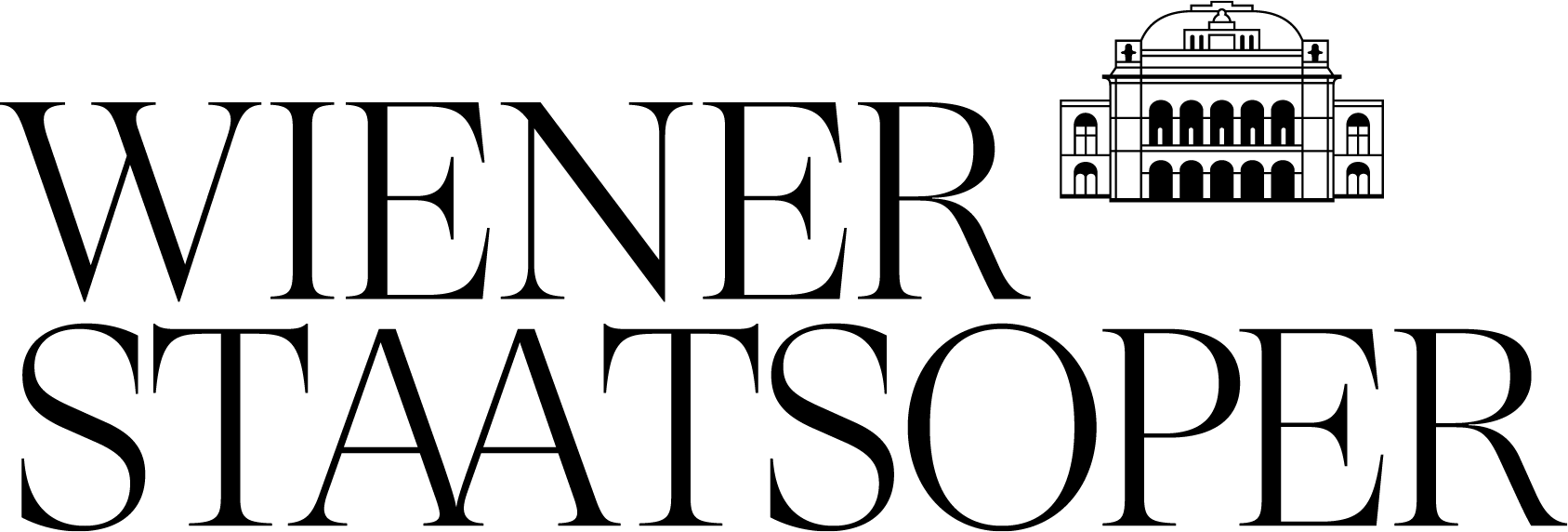

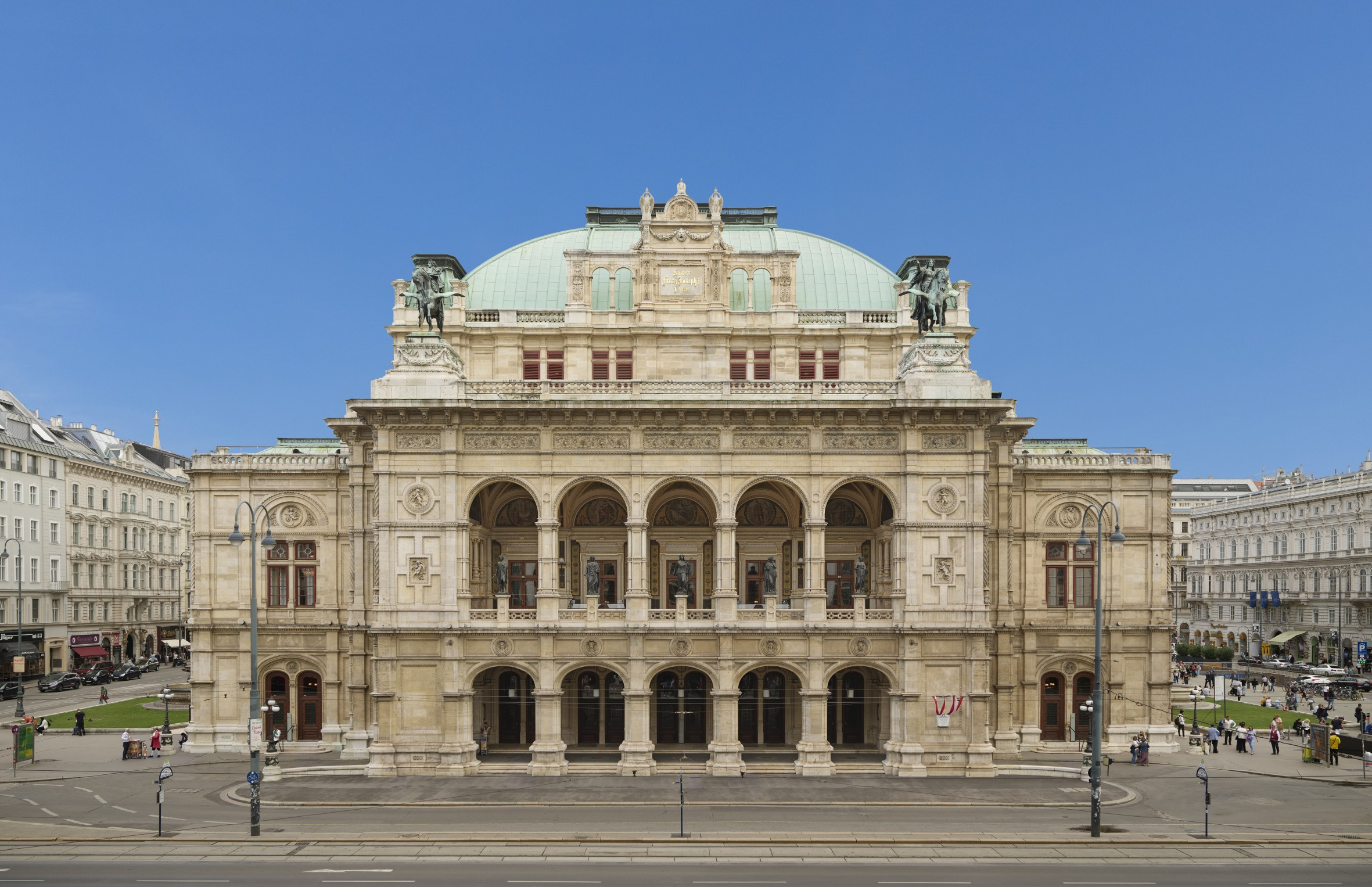
- Interactive map of Vienna State Opera
- Former names: Vienna Court Opera (Wiener Hofoper)
- Location: Vienna, Austria
- Coordinates: 48°12′11″N 16°22′8″E
- Owner: City of Vienna
- Capacity: 1,709 seated, 567 standing
- Type: Opera house
- Public transit: Karlsplatz, 1 2 D 62 71 Opernring, Bus 59A

Construction
- Opened: 25 May 1869
- Architects: August Sicard von Sicardsburg; Eduard van der Nüll
- Builder: Josef Hlávka

Website
- wiener-staatsoper.at

The Vienna State Opera (German: Wiener Staatsoper, IPA: [ˈviːnɐ ˈʃtaːtsˌʔoːpɐ]) is an opera house and opera company located in Vienna, Austria. The 1,709-seat Renaissance Revival venue was the first major building on the Vienna Ring Road. It was built from 1861 to 1869 following plans by August Sicard von Sicardsburg and Eduard van der Nüll, and designs by Josef Hlávka. The opera house was inaugurated as the "Vienna Court Opera" (Wiener Hofoper) in the presence of Emperor Franz Joseph I and Empress Elisabeth of Austria. It became known by its current name after the establishment of the First Austrian Republic in 1921. The Vienna State Opera is the successor of the old Vienna Court Opera (built in 1636 inside the Hofburg). The new site was chosen and the construction paid by Emperor Franz Joseph in 1861.

The members of the Vienna Philharmonic are recruited from the Vienna State Opera orchestra. The building is also the home of the Vienna State Ballet and it hosts the annual Vienna Opera Ball during the carnival season.

== History ==
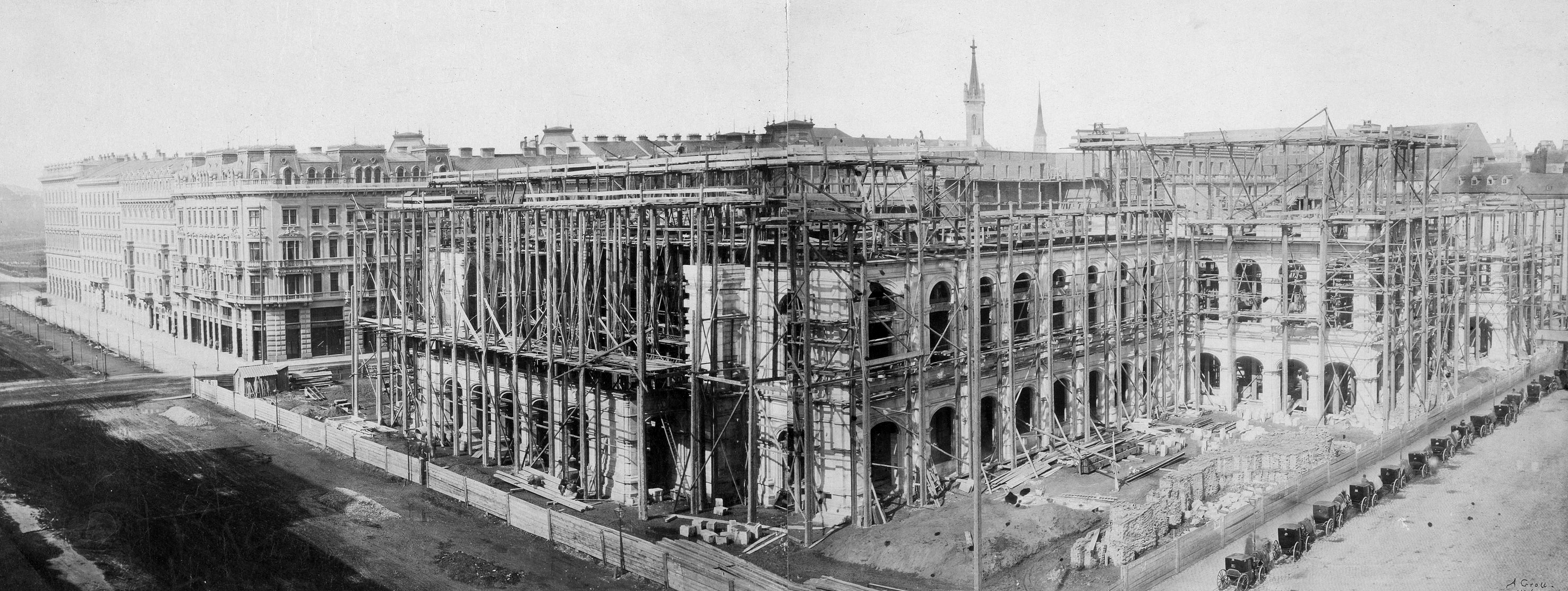
Vienna State Opera House under construction, 1865

=== History of the building ===
==== Construction ====
The opera house was the first major building on the Vienna Ringstrasse commissioned by the Viennese "city expansion fund". Work commenced on the house in 1861 and was completed in 1869, following plans drawn up by architects August Sicard von Sicardsburg and Eduard van der Nüll. It was built in the Neo-Renaissance style by the Czech architect and contractor Josef Hlávka.

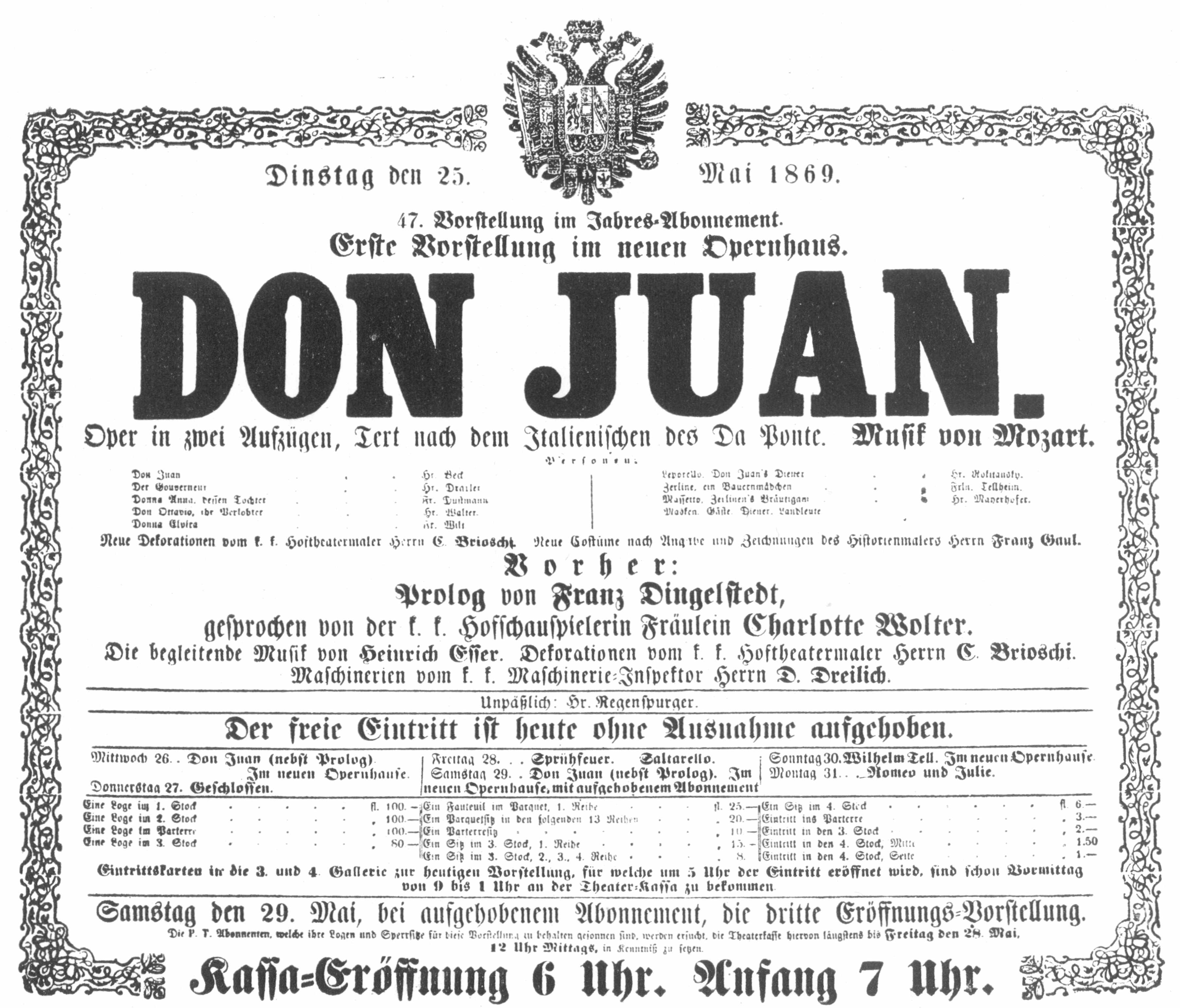
Play bill for the opening performance of the new Opernhaus, announcing the opening performance of Don Giovanni on 25 May 1869

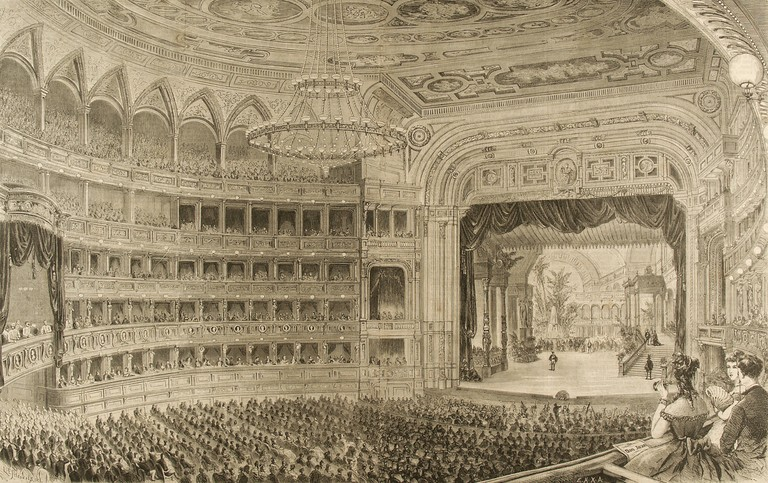
Coeval watercolour painting of the opening performance (Kunsthistorisches Museum)

The Ministry of the Interior had commissioned a number of reports into the availability of certain building materials, with the result that stones long not seen in Vienna were used, such as Wöllersdorfer Stein, for plinths and free-standing, simply-divided buttresses, the famously hard stone from Kaisersteinbruch, whose colour was more appropriate than that of Kelheimerstein, for more lushly decorated parts. The somewhat coarser-grained Kelheimerstein (also known as Solnhof Plattenstein) was intended as the main stone to be used in the building of the opera house, but the necessary quantity was not deliverable. Breitenbrunner stone was suggested as a substitute for the Kelheimer stone, and stone from Jois was used as a cheaper alternative to the Kaiserstein. The staircases were constructed from polished Kaiserstein, while most of the rest of the interior was decorated with varieties of marble.

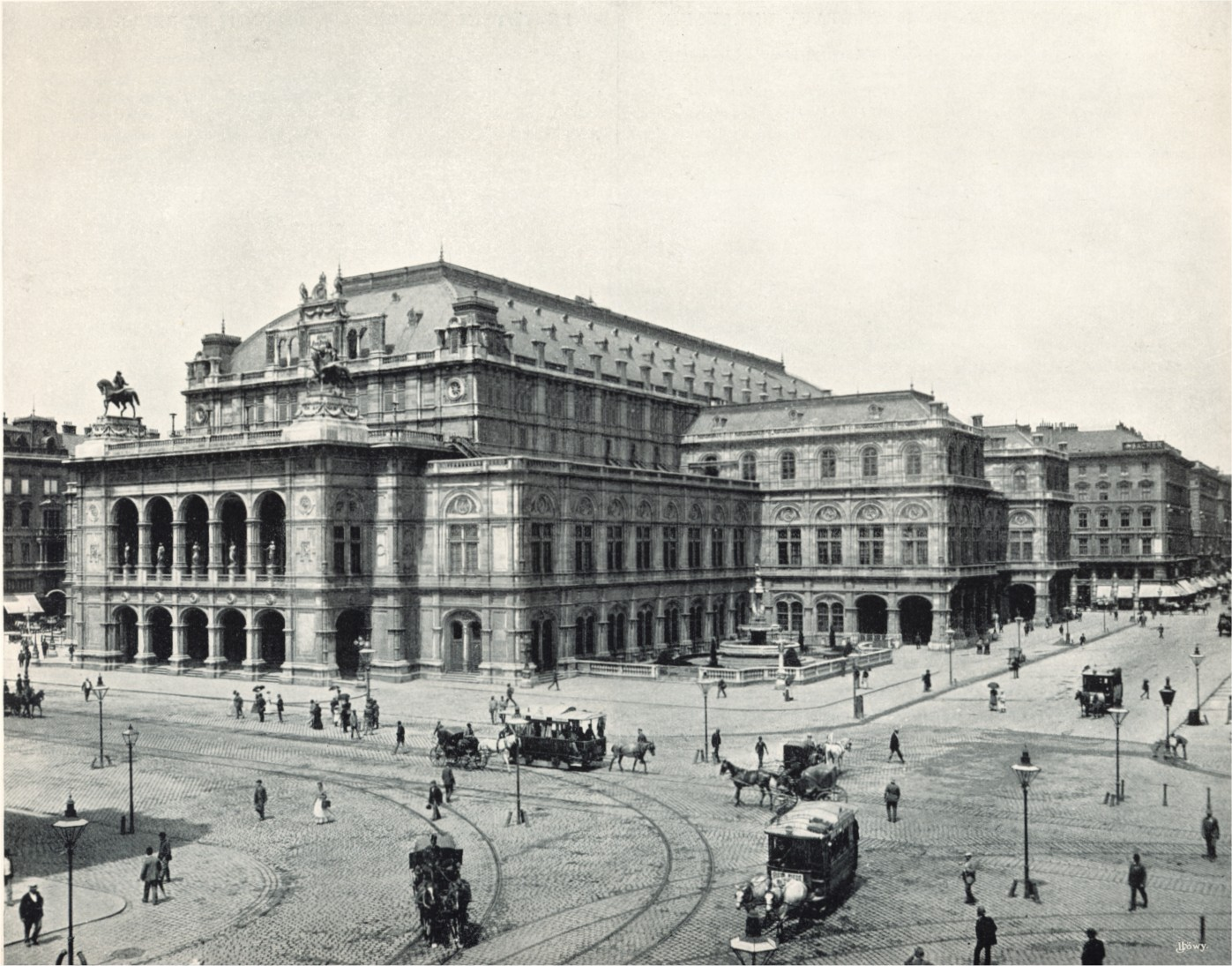
The Hofoper, c. 1898

The decision was made to use dimension stone for the exterior of the building. Due to the monumental demand for stone, stone from Sóskút, widely used in Budapest, was also used. Three Viennese masonry companies were employed to supply enough masonry labour: Eduard Hauser (still in existence today), Anton Wasserburger and Moritz Pranter. The foundation stone was laid on 20 May 1863.

==== Public response ====
The building, however, was not particularly well-received by the public. For one, it lacked the grandeur of the Heinrichshof, a private residence destroyed during World War II and later replaced in 1955 by the Opernringhof. Additionally, the opera house’s construction was overshadowed by an unexpected issue: the level of the Ringstraße in front of the building was raised by a metre after construction had already commenced, the latter was likened to "a sunken treasure chest" and, in analogy to the military disaster of 1866 (the Battle of Königgrätz), was deprecatingly referred to as "the 'Königgrätz' of architecture". Eduard van der Nüll committed suicide, and barely ten weeks later Sicardsburg died from tuberculosis so neither architect saw the completion of the building. The opening premiere was Don Giovanni, by Mozart, on 25 May 1869. Emperor Franz Josef and Empress Elisabeth (Sissi) were present.

=== Gustav Mahler ===
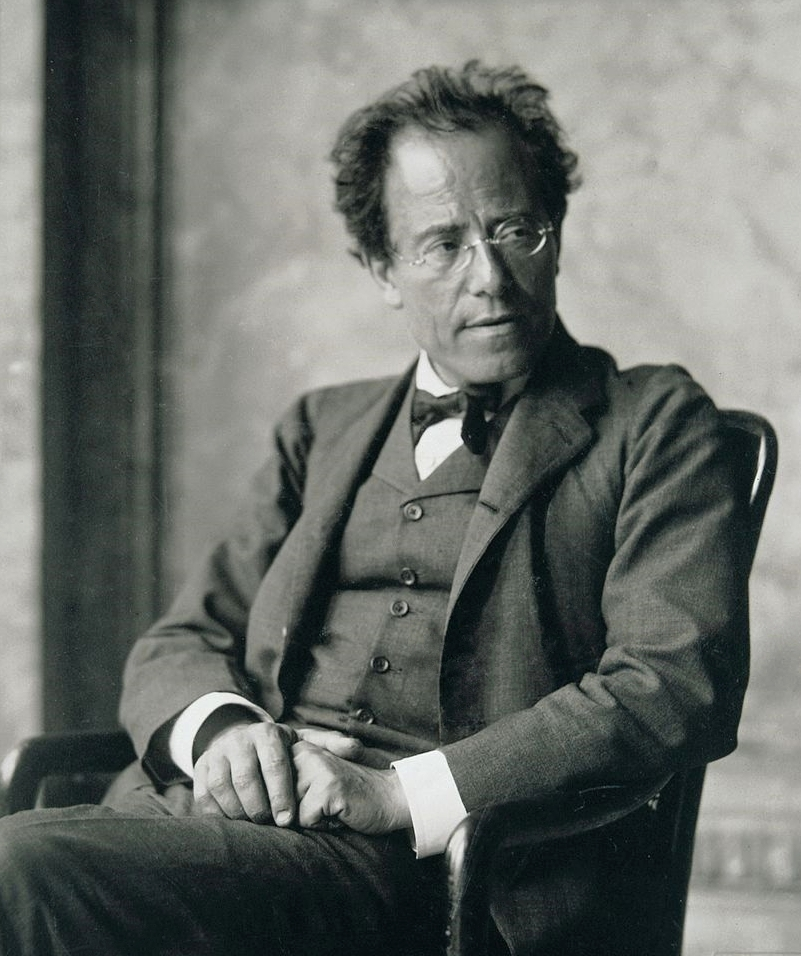
Gustav Mahler was artistic director of the Hofoper from 1897 to 1907.

Gustav Mahler was one of the many conductors who have worked in Vienna. During his tenure (1897–1907), Mahler cultivated a new generation of singers, such as Anna Bahr-Mildenburg and Selma Kurz, and recruited a stage designer who replaced the lavish historical stage decors with sparse stage scenery corresponding to modernistic, Jugendstil tastes. Mahler also introduced the practice of dimming the lighting in the theatre during performances, which was initially not appreciated by the audience. However, Mahler's reforms were maintained by his successors.

=== WW II bombing and redesign ===
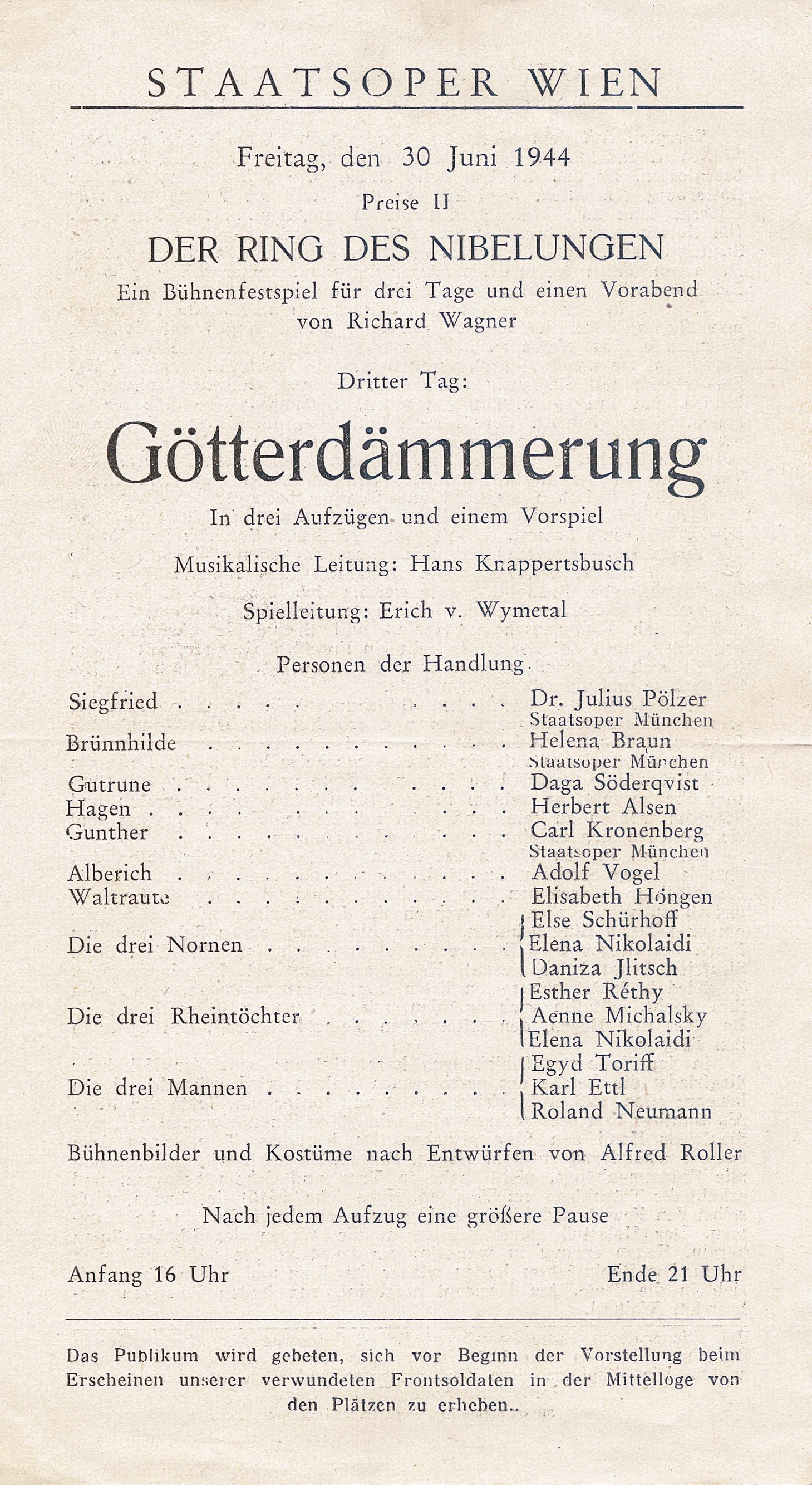
Play bill of the last performance in the old building: Götterdämmerung, 30 June 1944

Towards the end of World War II, on 12 March 1945, the opera was set alight by an American bombardment. The auditorium and stage were destroyed by flames, as well as almost the entire décor and props for more than 120 operas with around 150,000 costumes. The front section, which had been walled off as a precaution, however, remained intact including the foyer, with frescoes by Moritz von Schwind, the main stairways, the vestibule and the tea room. The State Opera was temporarily housed at the Theater an der Wien and at the Vienna Volksoper.

Lengthy discussion took place about whether the opera house should be restored to its original state on its original site, or whether it should be completely demolished and rebuilt, either on the same location or on a different site. Eventually the decision was made to rebuild the opera house as it had been, and the main restoration experts involved were Ernst Kolb (1948–1952) and Udo Illig (1953–1956).

The Austrian Federal Chancellor Leopold Figl made the decision in 1946 to have a functioning opera house again by 1949. An architectural competition was announced, which was won by Erich Boltenstern. The submissions had ranged from a complete restructuring of the auditorium to a replica of the original design; Boltenstern decided on a design similar to the original with some modernisation in keeping with the design of the 1950s. In order to achieve good acoustics, wood was the favoured building material, on the advice of, among others, Arturo Toscanini. In addition, the number of seats in the parterre (stalls) was reduced, and the fourth gallery, which had been fitted with columns, was restructured so as not to need columns. The façade, entrance hall and the "Schwind" foyer were restored and remain in their original style.

In the meantime, the opera company, which had at first been performing in the Volksoper, had moved rehearsals and performances to Theater an der Wien, where, on 1 May 1945, after the liberation and re-independence of Austria from the Nazis, the first performances were given. In 1947, the company went on tour to London.

Due to the appalling conditions at Theater an der Wien, the opera company leadership tried to raise significant quantities of money to speed up reconstruction of the original opera house. Many private donations were made, as well as donations of building material from the Soviets, who were very interested in the rebuilding of the opera. The mayor of Vienna had receptacles placed in many sites around Vienna for people to donate coins only. In this way, everyone in Vienna could say they had participated in the reconstruction and feel pride in considering themselves part owners.

However, in 1949, there was only a temporary roof on the Staatsoper, as construction work continued. It was not until 5 November 1955, after the Austrian State Treaty, that the Staatsoper could be reopened with a performance of Beethoven's Fidelio, conducted by Karl Böhm. The American Secretary of State, John Foster Dulles, was present. The state broadcaster ORF used the occasion to make its first live broadcast, at a time when there were only c. 800 televiewers in the whole of Austria. The new auditorium had a reduced capacity of about 2,276, including 567 standing room places. The ensemble, which had remained unified until the opening, crumbled in the following years, and slowly an international ensemble formed.

=== History of the Company After the Second World War ===
In 1945, the Wiener Mozart-Ensemble was formed, which put on guest performances and became known particularly for its singing and playing culture. The Austrian conductor Josef Krips was the founder and mentor, who had only survived the Nazi era (given his Jewish heritage) thanks to luck and help from colleagues. At the end of the war, Krips started the renovation of the Staatoper, and was able to implement his aesthetic principles, including the departure from the Romantic Mozart ideal with a voluminous orchestral sound. Instead, qualities more associated with chamber music were featured, as well as a clearer, lighter sound, which would later come to be known as "typically Viennese". Singers who worked with Krips during this time were Erich Kunz, Elisabeth Schwarzkopf and Wilma Lipp, among others.

As early as 1947, the Mozart-Ensemble was playing guest performances at the Royal Opera House in London, with Mozart's Don Giovanni. Richard Tauber, who had fled from the Nazis, sang Don Ottavio; three months later he died, and was remembered for singing with "half a lung" in order to fulfil his dream, many other artists became associated with the Mozart-Ensemble, for example Karl Böhm, but their role was still greatly peripheral, in a straightforward or assisting role. This was the beginning of Krips' worldwide career, which would take him to the most prominent houses in the world. Until his death in 1974, Krips was regarded as one of the most important Maestri (conductors/music directors) of the Staatsoper.

On 1 July 1998, a historical broadcast took place, as Austria undertook its first presidency of the European Union. Fidelio was broadcast live from the Vienna State Opera to the 15 capital cities of the EU.

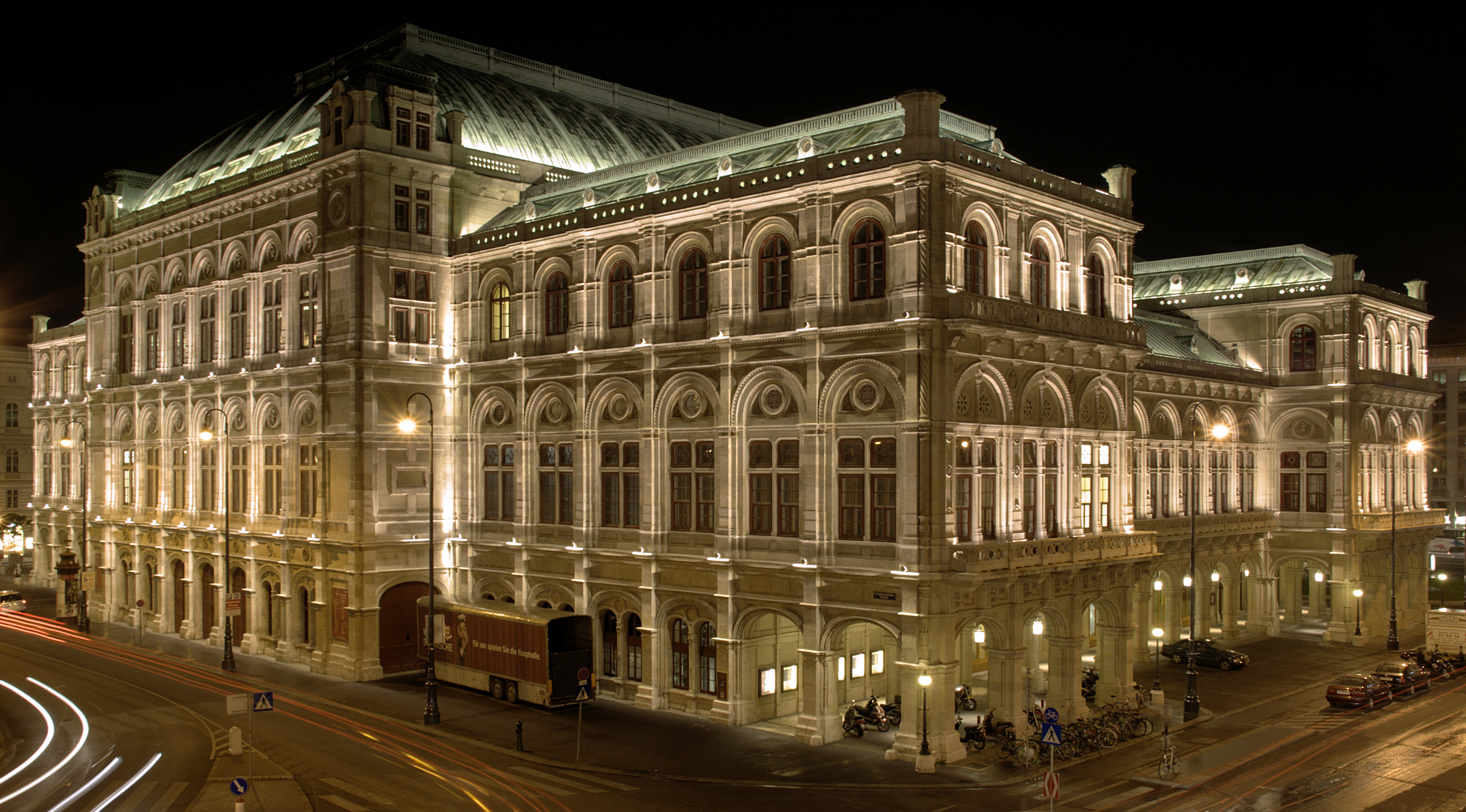
Rear of the opera house, showing the stage wings

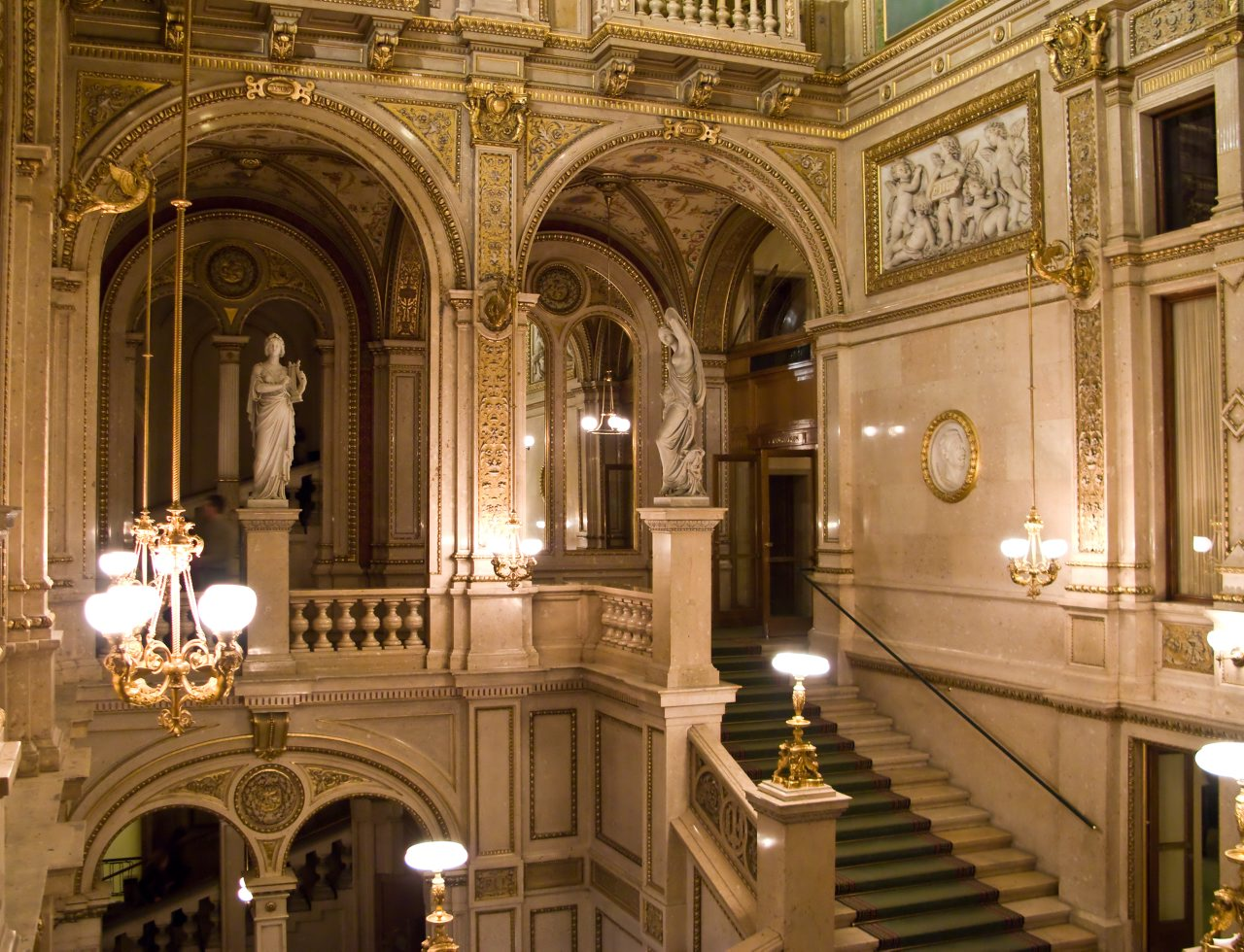
A marble staircase between the main entrance and the first floor

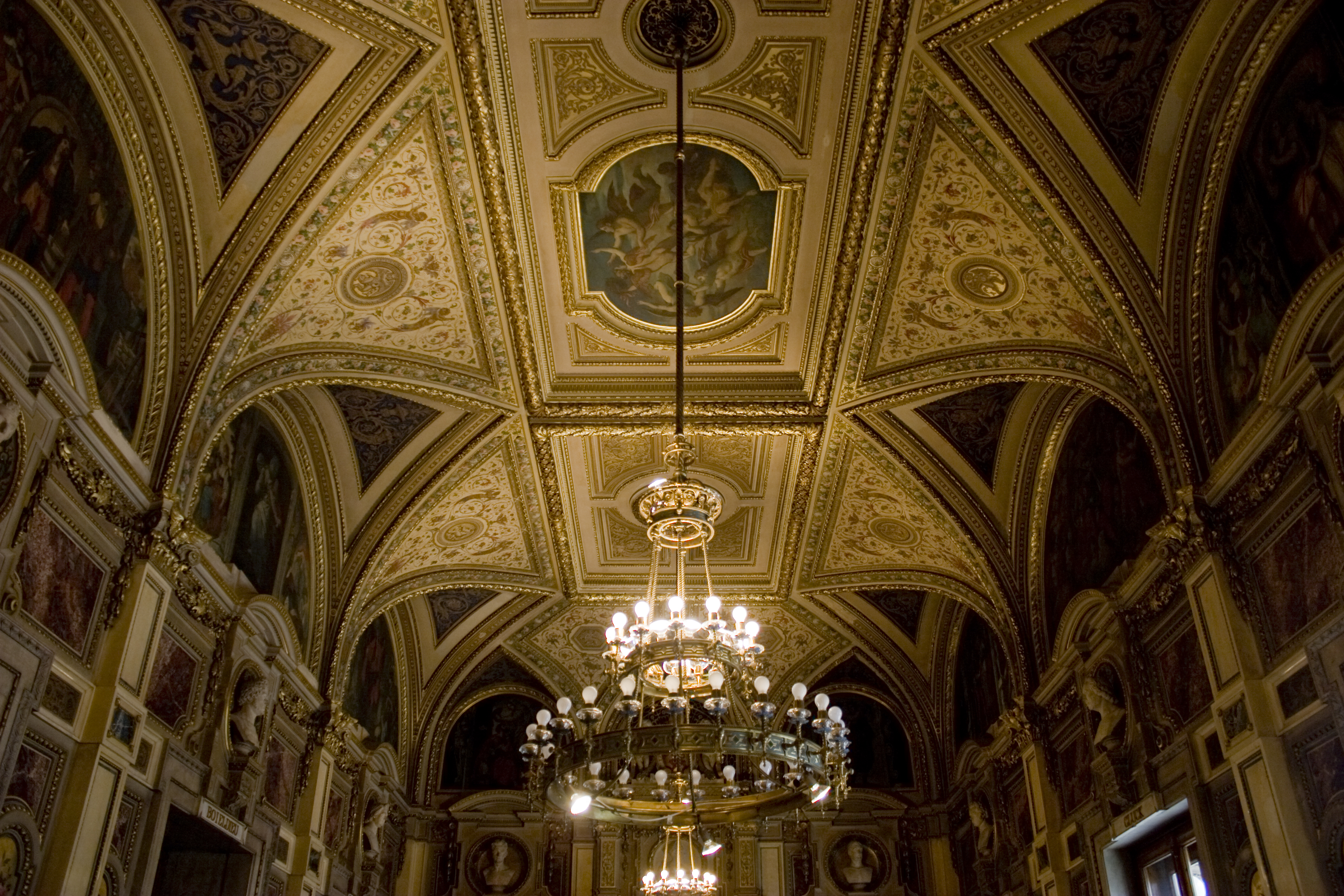
One of the lobbies

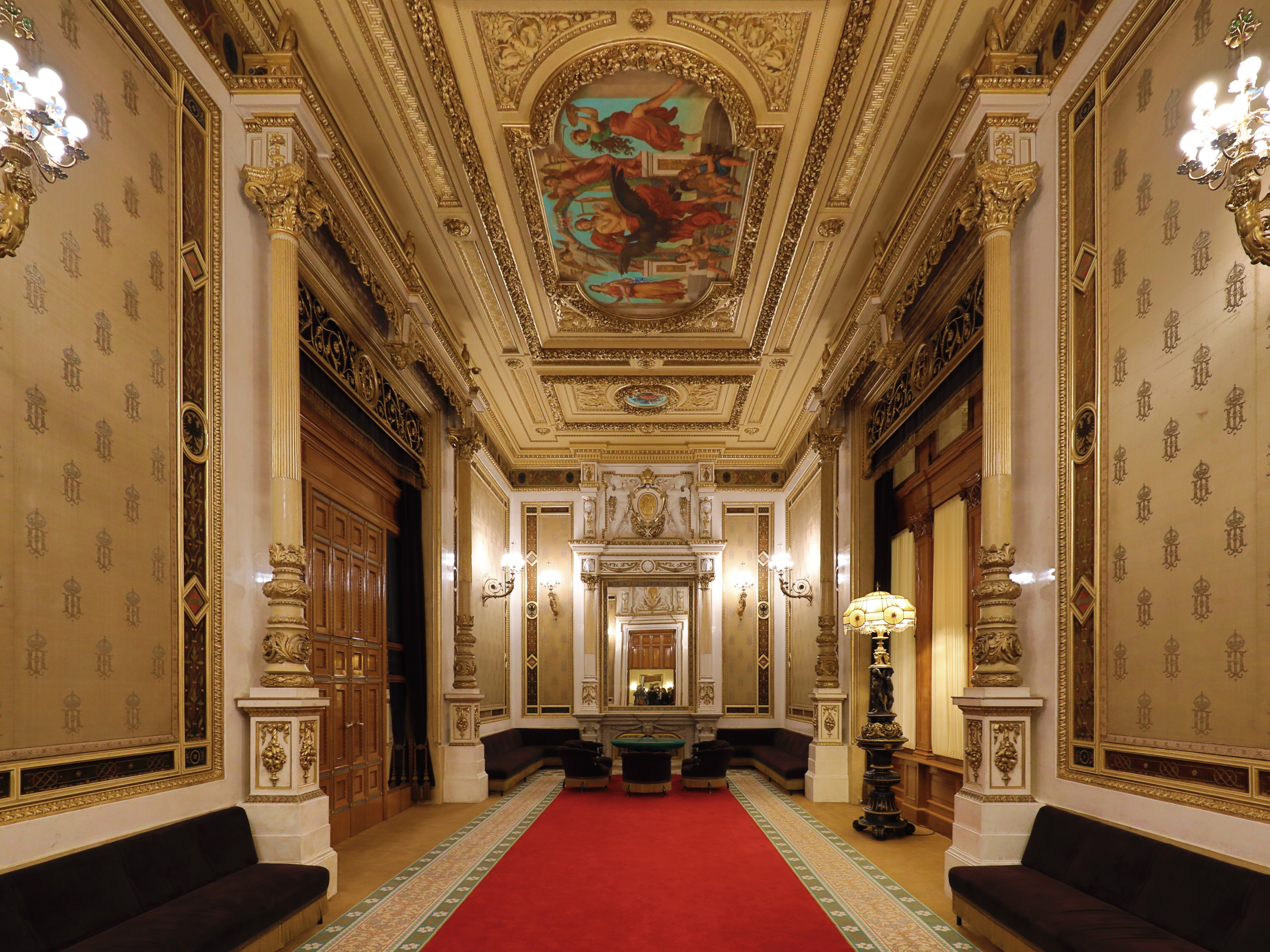
Emperor's private room

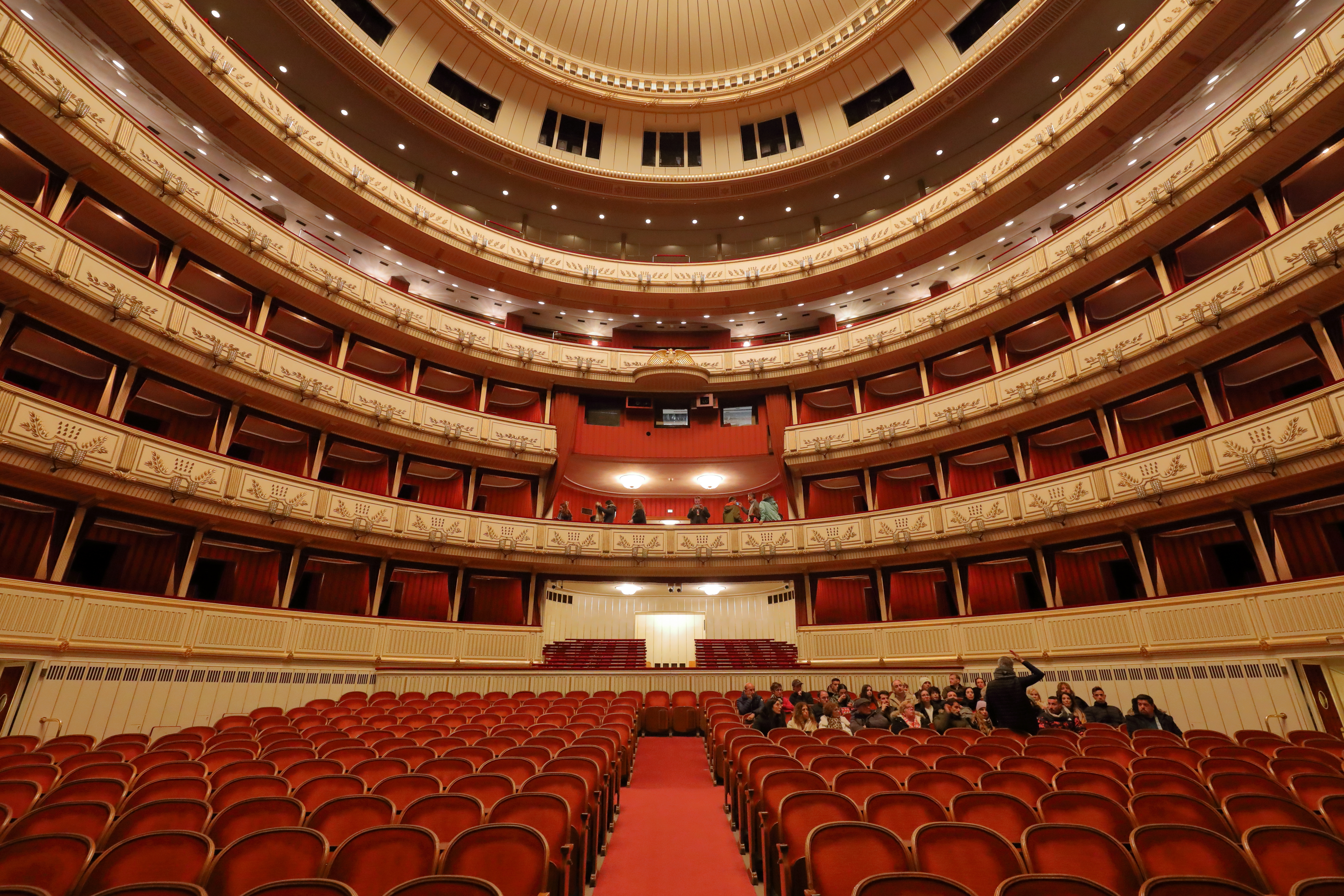
The auditorium

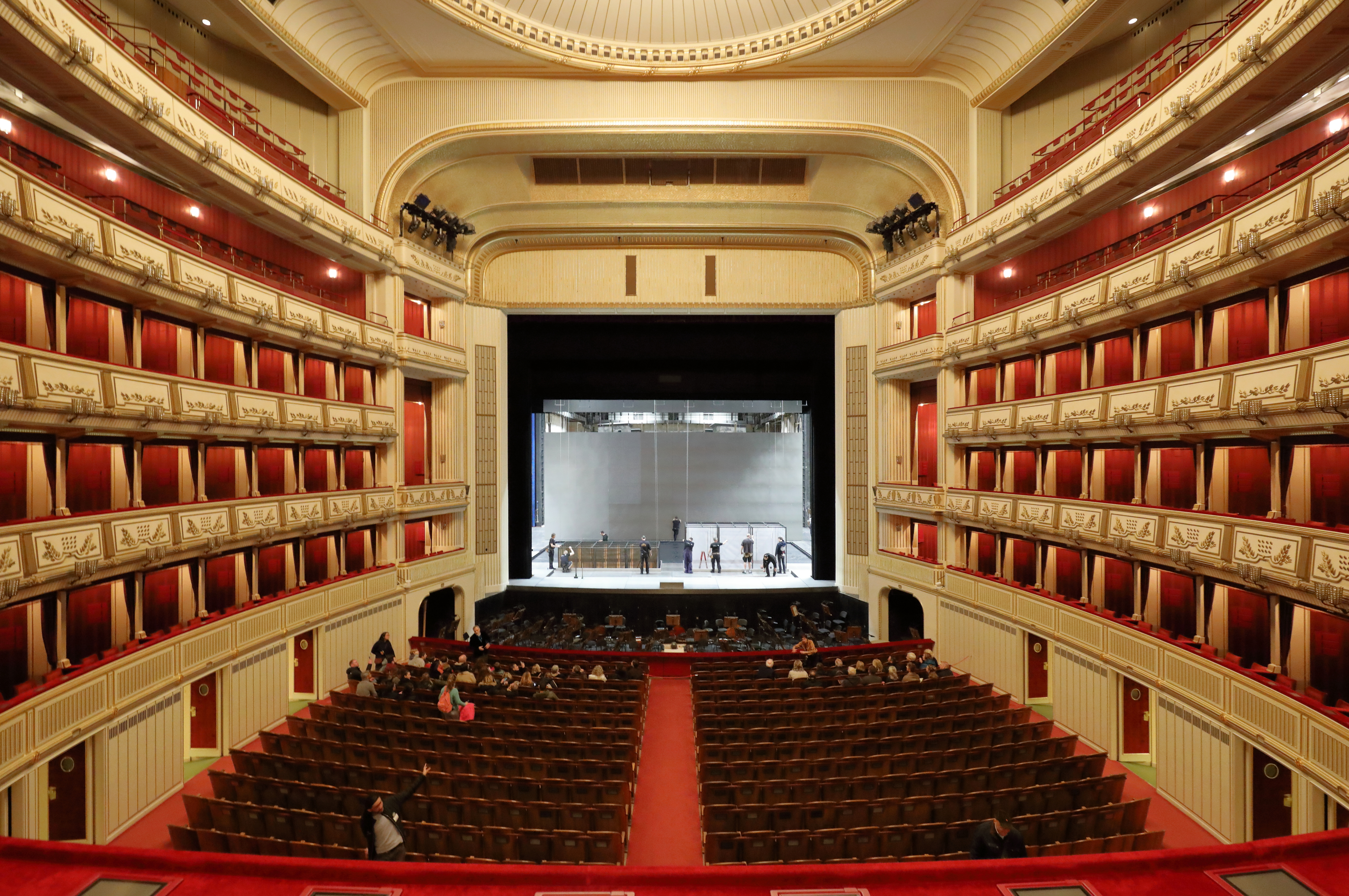
View from the auditorium to the stage

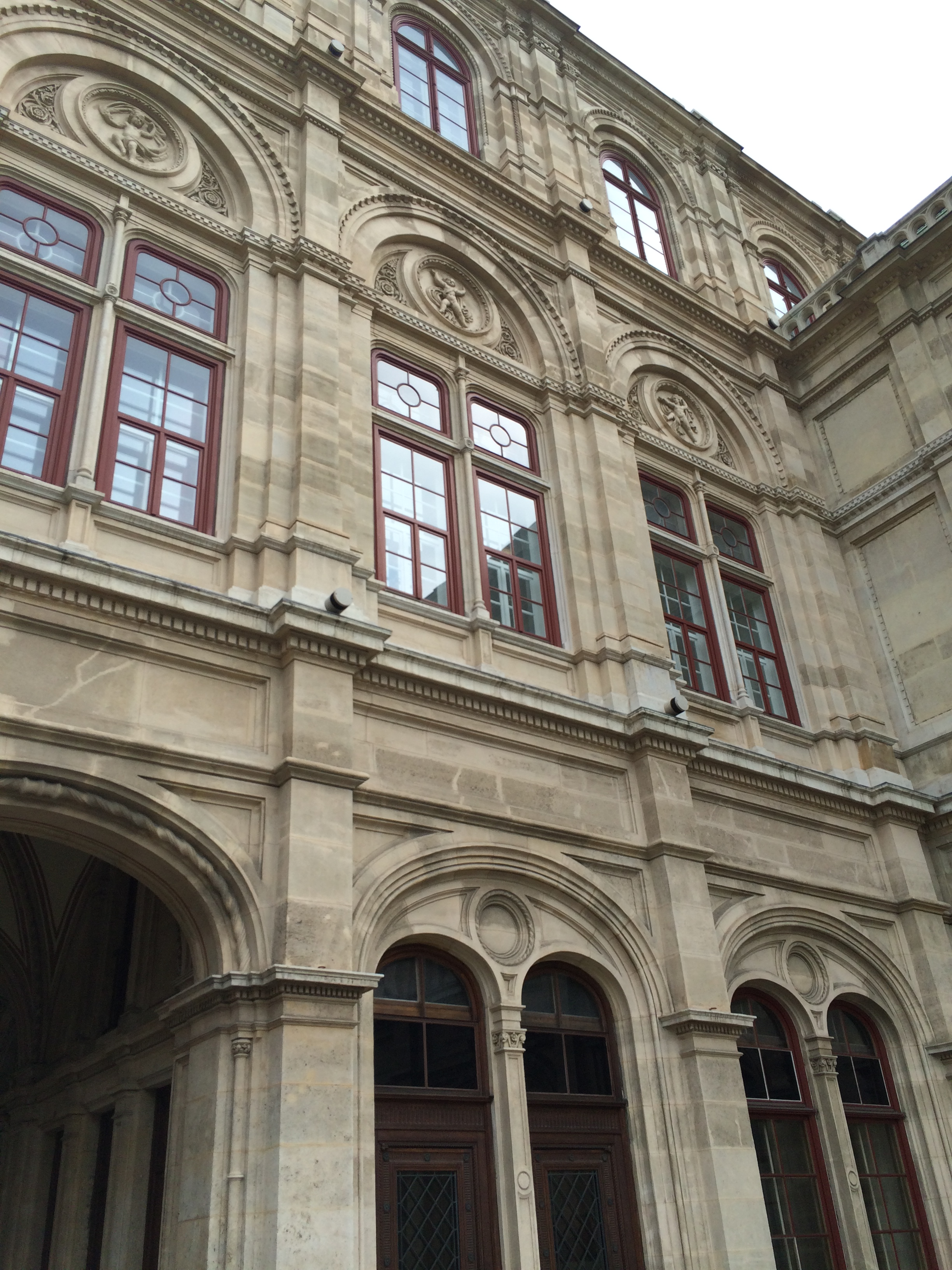
Exterior of the building

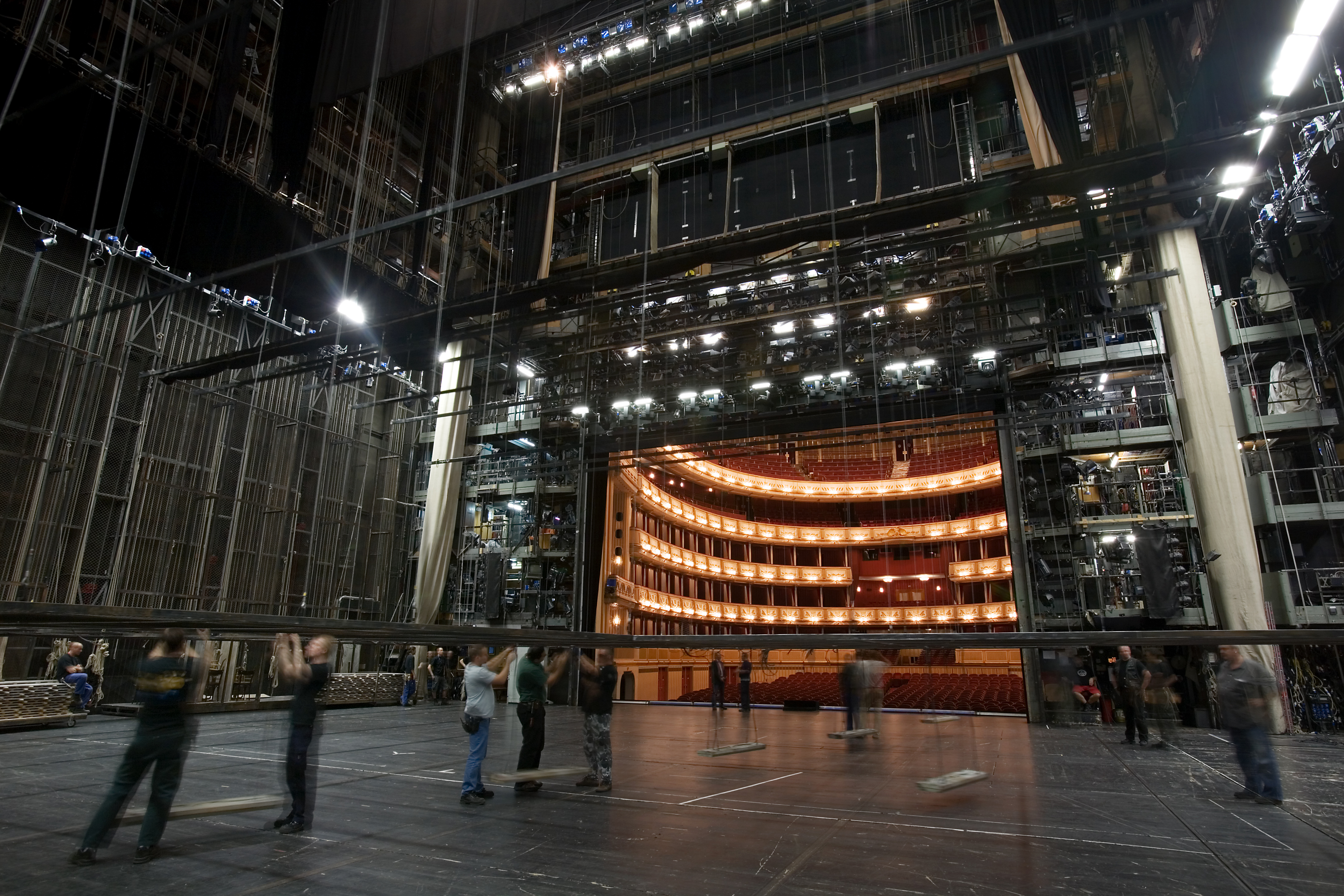
Backstage area

== Today ==
=== The company ===
The Vienna State Opera is closely linked to the Vienna Philharmonic, which is an incorporated society of its own, but whose members are recruited from the orchestra of the Vienna State Opera.

The Wiener Staatsoper is one of the busiest opera houses in the world producing 50 to 60 operas in a repertory system per year and ten ballet productions in more than 350 performances. It is quite common to find a different opera being produced each day of a week. The Staatsoper employs over 1000 people. As of 2008, the annual operating budget of the Staatsoper was 100 million euros with slightly more than 50% as a state subsidy.

The company's 2019 production of Olga Neuwirth's opera Orlando marked the first production of an opera by a female composer in the history of the Vienna State Opera.

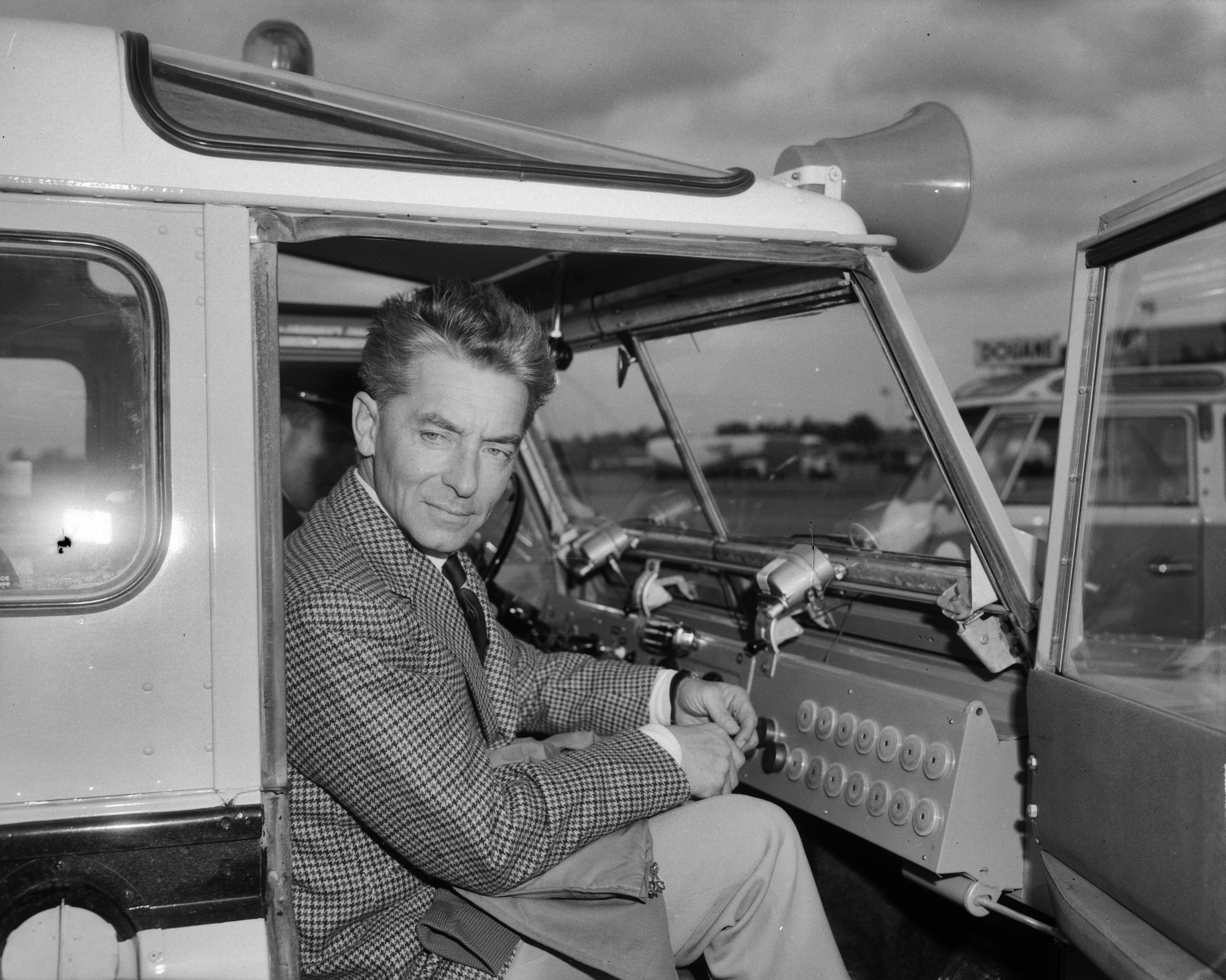
Herbert von Karajan, artistic director of the Vienna State Opera from 1957 to 1964

=== Herbert von Karajan ===
Herbert von Karajan introduced the practice of performing operas exclusively in their original language instead of being translated into German. He also strengthened the ensemble and regular principal singers and introduced the policy of predominantly engaging guest singers. He began a collaboration with La Scala in Milan, in which both productions and orchestrations were shared. This created an opening for the prominent members of the Viennese ensemble to appear in Milan, especially to perform works by Wolfgang Amadeus Mozart and Richard Strauss.

=== Ballet companies merge ===
At the beginning of the 2005–2006 season, the ballet companies of the Staatsoper and the Vienna Volksoper were merged under the direction of Gyula Harangozó, which led to a reduction in the number of performers in the resulting ensemble. This has resulted in an increase in the number of guest stars engaged to work in the ballet. The practice of combining the two ballet companies proved an artistic failure, and Harangozó left when his contract expired in 2010.

From the 2010–2011 season a new company was formed called Wiener Staatsballet, Vienna State Ballet, under the direction of former Paris Opera Ballet principal dancer Manuel Legris. Legris eliminated Harangozós's policy of presenting nothing but traditional narrative ballets with guest artists in the leading roles, concentrated on establishing a strong in-house ensemble and restored evenings of mixed bill programs, featuring works of George Balanchine, Jerome Robbins, Jiří Kylián, William Forsythe, and many contemporary choreographers, as well as a reduced schedule of the classic ballets.

=== 140th anniversary season ===
2009 marked the 140th anniversary of the Vienna Opera House. To celebrate this milestone an idea designed to reach out and embrace a new audience was conceived. A giant 50 sqm screen was placed on the side of the opera house facing Kärntner Straße. In four months live broadcasts of over 60 famous operas were transmitted in this way, including performances of Madama Butterfly, The Magic Flute and Don Giovanni. This successful venture brought a new wave of operatic excitement to the many tourists and locals who experienced this cultural event. During daytime the screen displays a replica of the Opera House's façade, as it obstructs a considerable part of the building, along with information about upcoming performances.

=== The opera house and children ===
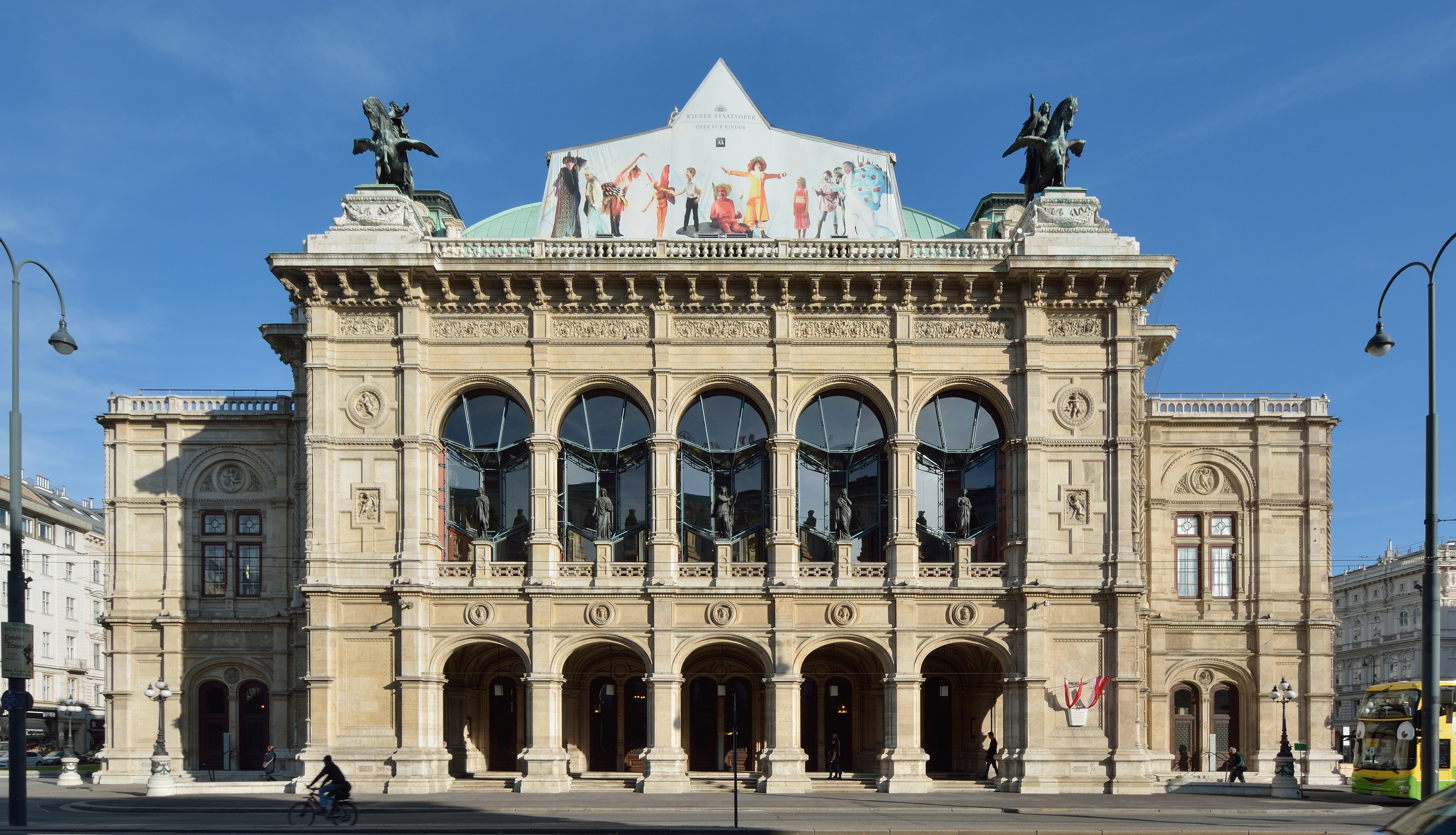
View from the Ring, on the roof the tent for children's performances (demounted in 2015 and now replaced by a special theatre)

The Vienna State Opera is particularly open to children: under Holender's direction (he has three children of his own), the opera house has become well known for its children's productions, which are performed in a tent on the roof of the Staatsoper. Recent examples include Peter Pan, Das Traumfresserchen (The Dream Gobbler), Der 35. Mai (The 35th of May), C. F. E. Horneman's Aladdin, Bastien und Bastienne and Wagners Nibelungenring für Kinder (Wagner's Ring for children). In addition to this, there is a production of The Magic Flute every year for 9- and 10-year-olds, decorated like the Opernball.

The opera house also has an opera school for boys and girls between the ages of eight and fourteen, which takes place in the afternoons after regular school. The children are introduced to music theatre and the prospect of becoming opera singers. The company recruits singers for children's roles in its productions from this opera school. Twice every season there is a special matinée performance of the opera school. In 2006, the 250th anniversary of Mozart's birth, they performed a 20-minute miniature opera Der kleine Friedrich arranged from songs of Mozart by Janko Kastelic and Claudia Toman.

=== "Standing room only" audience ===
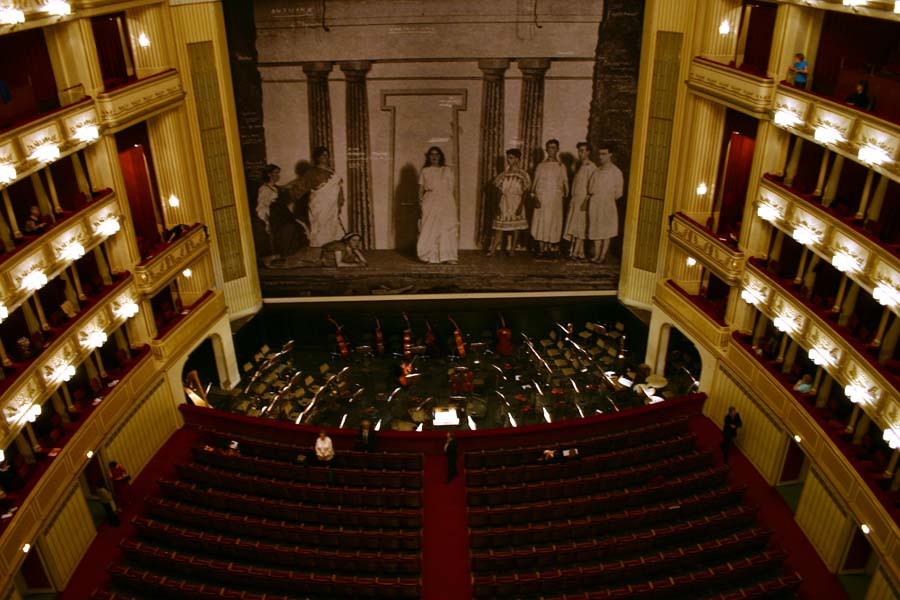
View of the orchestra pit and safety curtain The curtain Play as Cast was designed by Tacita Dean, and installed during the season 2004–2005.

Eighty minutes before each performance, standing room tickets are sold for €10.

=== Der Neue Merker ===
Every performance at the Vienna State Opera is reviewed by an independent company in the opera publication Der Neue Merker (The New Judge) which is printed in about 2000 copies. This is unusual in that most opera magazines prefer to concentrate on new productions and premieres. There is an online version parallel to the publication, which receives (as of March 2007) an average of 10,000 visitors a week, and therefore is one of the most successful German-language opera portals.

=== Opera ball ===
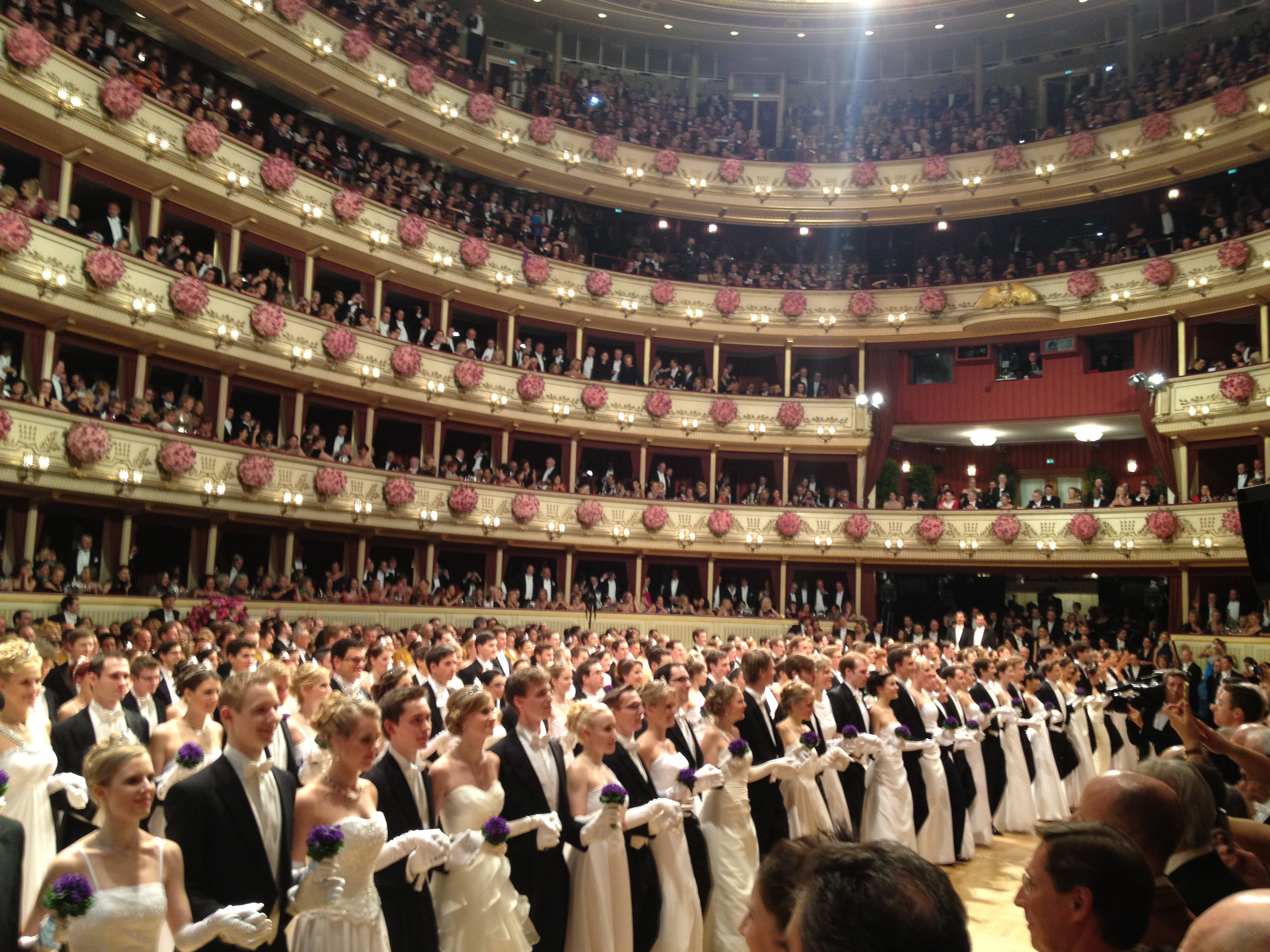
Debutants entry at the Vienna Opera Ball

For many decades, the opera house has been the venue of the Vienna Opera Ball. It is an event, which takes place annually on the last Thursday in Fasching. Those in attendance often include visitors from around the world, especially prominent names in business and politics. The opera ball receives media coverage from a range of outlets.

The opera ball in 1968 was the occasion for a protest, at which the organisation was criticised for being "elite" (due to the high prices), "conceited" (due to the opulent display of wealth for the newspapers and cameras) and "reactionary" (for upholding an allegedly outdated culture). There was violence between the demonstrators and the police.

=== Safety curtain ===
"Safety Curtain" is an exhibition series conceived by the non-profit art initiative museum in progress, which has been transforming the safety curtain of the Vienna State Opera into a temporary exhibition space for contemporary art since 1998. A jury (Daniel Birnbaum and Hans-Ulrich Obrist) selects the artists whose works are attached to the safety curtain by means of magnets and are shown during the course of a season. Artists up to date: Pierre Alechinsky, Tauba Auerbach, John Baldessari, Matthew Barney, Thomas Bayrle, Tacita Dean, Cerith Wyn Evans, Dominique Gonzalez-Foerster, Richard Hamilton, David Hockney, Christine & Irene Hohenbüchler, Joan Jonas, Martha Jungwirth, Jeff Koons, Maria Lassnig, Oswald Oberhuber, Giulio Paolini, Rirkrit Tiravanija, Rosemarie Trockel, Cy Twombly, Kara Walker, Carrie Mae Weems and Franz West.

== Directors / general managers ==
In chronological order, the directors (or general managers) of the Staatsoper have been:

- Franz von Dingelstedt (1867–70)
- Johann von Herbeck (1870–75)
- Franz von Jauner (1875–80)
- Wilhelm Jahn (1881–97)
- Gustav Mahler (1897–1907)
- Felix Weingartner, Edler von Münzberg (first term, 1908–11)
- Hans Gregor (1911–18)
- Richard Strauss / Franz Schalk (1919–24)
- Franz Schalk (1924–29)
- Clemens Krauss (1929–34)
- Felix von Weingartner (second term, 1935–36)
- Erwin Kerber (1936–40)
- Heinrich Karl Strohm (1940–41)
- Lothar Müthel (1941–42)
- Karl Böhm (first term, 1943–45)
- Franz Salmhofer (1945–54)
- Karl Böhm (second term, 1954–56)
- Herbert von Karajan (1956–1964)
- Egon Hilbert (1964–68)
- Heinrich Reif-Gintl (1968–72)
- Rudolf Gamsjäger (1972–76)
- Egon Seefehlner (first term, 1976–82)
- Lorin Maazel (1982–84)
- Egon Seefehlner (second term, 1984–86)
- Claus Helmut Drese (1986–91)
- Eberhard Wächter (1991–92)
- Ioan Holender (1992–2010)
- Dominique Meyer (2010–2020)
- Bogdan Roščić (2020–present)

== Artistic/music directors ==
- Richard Strauss (1919–1924)
- Bruno Walter (1936–1938)
- Claudio Abbado (1986–1991)
- Seiji Ozawa (2002–2010)
- Franz Welser-Möst (2010–2014)
- Philippe Jordan (2020–2025)

== Prominent artists who have appeared at the Staatsoper ==
=== Singers ===
- Theo Adam
- Ain Anger
- Giacomo Aragall
- Agnes Baltsa
- Polly Batic
- Gabriela Beňačková
- Ettore Bastianini
- Piotr Beczała
- Teresa Berganza
- Walter Berry
- Jussi Björling
- Franco Bonisolli
- Montserrat Caballé
- Maria Callas
- José Carreras
- Enrico Caruso
- Mimi Coertse
- Franco Corelli
- José Cura
- Oskar Czerwenka
- Giuseppe Di Stefano
- Plácido Domingo (50th jubilee in May 2017)
- Otto Edelmann
- Anny Felbermayer
- Juan Diego Flórez
- Mirella Freni
- Ferruccio Furlanetto
- Elīna Garanča
- Nicolai Gedda
- Angela Gheorghiu
- Nicolai Ghiaurov
- Tito Gobbi
- Edita Gruberová (40th jubilee in September 2008, 50th jubilee in June 2018)
- Thomas Hampson
- Hans Hotter
- Gundula Janowitz
- Maria Jeritza
- Gwyneth Jones
- Sena Jurinac
- Vesselina Kasarova
- Jonas Kaufmann
- Angelika Kirchschlager
- Alfredo Kraus
- Elisabeth Kulman
- Erich Kunz
- Selma Kurz
- Christa Ludwig (final operatic performance in Elektra, 1994)
- Éva Marton
- Erie Mills
- Anna Moffo
- Anna Netrebko
- Birgit Nilsson
- Jessye Norman
- Jarmila Novotná
- Hasmik Papian
- Luciano Pavarotti
- Alfred Piccaver
- Johannes "JJ" Pietsch
- Lucia Popp
- Hermann Prey
- Leontyne Price
- Gianni Raimondi
- Ruggero Raimondi
- Maria Reining
- Leonie Rysanek
- Matti Salminen
- Elisabeth Schwarzkopf
- Renata Scotto
- Cesare Siepi
- Giulietta Simionato
- Bo Skovhus
- Nina Stemme
- Lise Davidsen
- Michail Svetlev
- Giuseppe Taddei
- Martti Talvela
- Richard Tauber
- Renata Tebaldi
- Bryn Terfel
- Rolando Villazón
- Eberhard Wächter
- Otto Wiener
- Fritz Wunderlich
- Heinz Zednik

=== Conductors ===
- Claudio Abbado
- Kurt Adler
- Gerd Albrecht
- Ernest Ansermet
- Leonard Bernstein
- Bertrand de Billy
- Karl Böhm
- Semyon Bychkov
- Riccardo Chailly
- André Cluytens
- Colin Davis
- Victor de Sabata
- Hubert Deutsch
- Antal Doráti
- Christoph von Dohnányi
- Gustavo Dudamel
- Wilhelm Furtwängler
- John Eliot Gardiner
- Daniele Gatti
- Gianandrea Gavazzeni
- Michael Gielen
- Leopold Hager
- Daniel Harding
- Nikolaus Harnoncourt
- Paul Hindemith
- Heinrich Hollreiser`
- Philippe Jordan
- Carlos Kleiber
- Erich Kleiber
- Berislav Klobučar
- Hans Knappertsbusch
- Clemens Krauss
- Josef Krips
- Rafael Kubelík
- Jan Latham-Koenig
- Erich Leinsdorf
- Lorin Maazel
- Charles Mackerras
- Ernst Märzendorfer
- Zubin Mehta
- Dimitri Mitropoulos
- Francesco Molinari-Pradelli
- Pierre Monteux
- Rudolf Moralt
- Lovro von Matačić
- Riccardo Muti
- Andris Nelsons
- Roger Norrington
- Daniel Oren
- Antonio Pappano
- John Pritchard
- Simon Rattle
- Hugo Reichenberger
- Fritz Reiner
- Hans Richter
- Mario Rossi
- Nello Santi
- Michael Schønwandt
- Leif Segerstam
- Tullio Serafin
- Giuseppe Sinopoli
- Leonard Slatkin
- Georg Solti
- Horst Stein
- Pinchas Steinberg
- Igor Stravinsky
- Otmar Suitner
- Robert Stolz
- Richard Strauss
- Christian Thielemann
- Arturo Toscanini
- Silvio Varviso
- Marcello Viotti
- Antonino Votto
- Bruno Walter
- Felix Weingartner

=== Directors, set designers, and costume designers ===
Opera title and year of debut at the Vienna State Opera in parentheses:

- Gae Aulenti (Il viaggio a Reims, 1988)
- Boleslaw Barlog (Salome, 1972)
- Sven-Eric Bechtolf (Arabella, 2006)
- Ruth Berghaus (Fierrabras, 1990)
- Milena Canonero (Il trittico, 1979)
- Robert Carsen (Jérusalem, 1995)
- Giulio Chazalettes (Attila, 1980)
- Luciano Damiani (Don Giovanni, 1967)
- Dieter Dorn (Die Entführung aus dem Serail, 1979)
- August Everding (Tristan und Isolde, 1967)
- Piero Faggioni (Norma, 1977)
- Jürgen Flimm (Der ferne Klang, 1991)
- Götz Friedrich (Moses und Aron, 1973)
- Ezio Frigerio, (Norma, 1977)
- Josef Gielen (Madama Butterfly, 1957)
- Peter J. Hall (Le nozze di Figaro, 1991)
- Karl-Ernst Herrmann (Die Entführung aus dem Serail, 1989)
- Václav Kašlík (Idomeneo, 1971)
- Jorge Lavelli (Der Prozess, 1970)
- Alfred Kirchner (Khovanchina, 1989)
- Harry Kupfer (Die schwarze Maske, 1986)
- Lotfi Mansouri (La fanciulla del west 1978)
- Gian Carlo Menotti (La Cenerentola, 1981)
- Jonathan Miller (Le nozze di Figaro, 1991)
- Giancarlo del Monaco (La forza del destino, 1989)
- Hans Neuenfels (Le Prophète, 1998)
- Hermann Nitsch (Hérodiade, 1995)
- Adrian Noble (Alcina, 2010)
- Timothy O'Brien (Turandot, 1983)
- Tom O'Horgan (Les Troyens, 1976)
- Laurent Pelly (La fille du régiment, 2007)
- Pier Luigi Pizzi (as stage designer: La forza del destino, 1974; as director: Don Carlo, 1989)
- Jean-Pierre Ponnelle (Manon, 1971)
- David Pountney (Rienzi, 1997)
- Harold Prince (Turandot, 1983)
- Gianni Quaranta (Samson et Dalila, 1988)
- Günther Rennert (Il barbiere di Siviglia, 1966)
- Luca Ronconi (Il viaggio a Reims, 1988)
- Ken Russell (Faust, 1985)
- Filippo Sanjust (Ariadne auf Naxos, 1976)
- Johannes Schaaf (Idomeneo, 1987)
- Otto Schenk (Jenůfa, 1964)
- Yuval Sharon (Tri Sestri, 2016)
- Franca Squarciapino (Norma, 1977)
- Peter Stein (Simon Boccanegra, 2002)
- Giorgio Strehler (Simon Boccanegra, 1984)
- Josef Svoboda (Idomeneo, 1971)
- István Szabó (Il trovatore, 1993)
- Carl Toms, (Faust, 1985)
- Luchino Visconti (Falstaff, 1966)
- Antoine Vitez (Pelléas et Mélisande, 1988)
- Wieland Wagner (Lohengrin, 1965)
- Margarete Wallmann (Tosca, 1958)
- Anthony Ward (Alcina, 2010)
- Herbert Wernicke (I vespri siciliani, 1998)
- Peter Wood (Macbeth, 1981)
- Franco Zeffirelli (La bohème, 1964)

== See also ==
- Carltheater
- Ringtheater
- Theater am Kärntnertor
