= Francine Deutsch =

American psychologist and writer

Francine M. Deutsch (born 1948) is an American writer and professor emeritus at the Mount Holyoke College in Massachusetts since 1981. She is a professor of Psychology and Education. She is specialized in the social psychology of gender in everyday life, gender inequality at home and in labour market, and the educational trajectories of pre-school teachers. She worked on the link between unequal earning, young children at home and domestic inequality in household duties.

She is interested in how people's lives are structured by gender. She did a lot of qualitative studies about couples who have established equality at home, or not. In reference to the article by Candace West and Zimmerman, Doing Gender, she did a reflection about how to undo gender in everyday life in her article Undoing Gender.

She did a lot of recognized works about equal parenting. In 2000, she wrote a book about that, Halving it All, How Equally Shared Parenting Works, using her interviews with families and couples egalitarian or unequal couples by trying to understand what factors affect this equality.

She is a member of PRESAGE (Research and Educational Programme on Gender Studies) program at Sciences Po Paris.

Deutsch received her BA from Carnegie-Mellon University and her PhD in social psychology from Columbia University.

== Quotations ==
"It's a vicious cycle ... After childbirth, women start to reduce their time in the labor force, and his job becomes more important, which makes the home central to her."

"“If you gave people a survey they would probably check all the answers about how things should be equal, ... But when they get to the part where “you ask them how things work for them day to day,” she says, “ideal does not match reality.”

"Equality exists without magic. Husbands and wives become equal sharers together, fighting, negotiating, and building as they go. The big news is that despite its rarity, equal sharing is not the province of a special elite. Avoiding the pitfalls of a home life built around superwoman or former superwoman, equal sharers are ordinary people simply inventing and reinventing solutions to the dilemmas of modern family life."

== Best known work ==
Deutsch, F. M., Ruble, D. N., Fleming, A., Brooks-Gunn, J., & Stangor, C., Information-seeking and maternal self-definition during the transition to motherhood. Journal of Personality and Social Psychology, 55(3), 420–431, 1988.

Deutsch, F. M., Lussier, J. B., & Servis, L. J., Husbands at home: Predictors of paternal participation in childcare and housework. Journal of Personality and Social Psychology, 65(6), 1154–1166, 1993.

Deutsch M. Francine, Halving it All, How Equally Shared Parenting Works, Harvard University Press, 1999.

Francine M. Deutsch, Undoing Gender, Gender and Society, Vol. 21, No. 1, pp. 106-127, Feb., 2007

Deutsch, F. M., & Yao, B. Gender differences in faculty attrition in the USA. Community, Work & Family, 17(4), 392–408, 2014.

Deutsch M. Francine, Ruth A. Gaunt, Creating Equality at Home: How 25 Couples Around the World Share Housework and Childcare, will be published in May 2020.
