= Religion in Croatia =

Religion in Croatia (2021 census)
1. Catholicism (83.0%)
2. Eastern Orthodoxy (3.35%)
3. Protestantism (0.26%)
4. Other Christian (0.73%)
5. No religion (6.39%)
6. Other religions (2.34%)
7. Undeclared (3.86%)

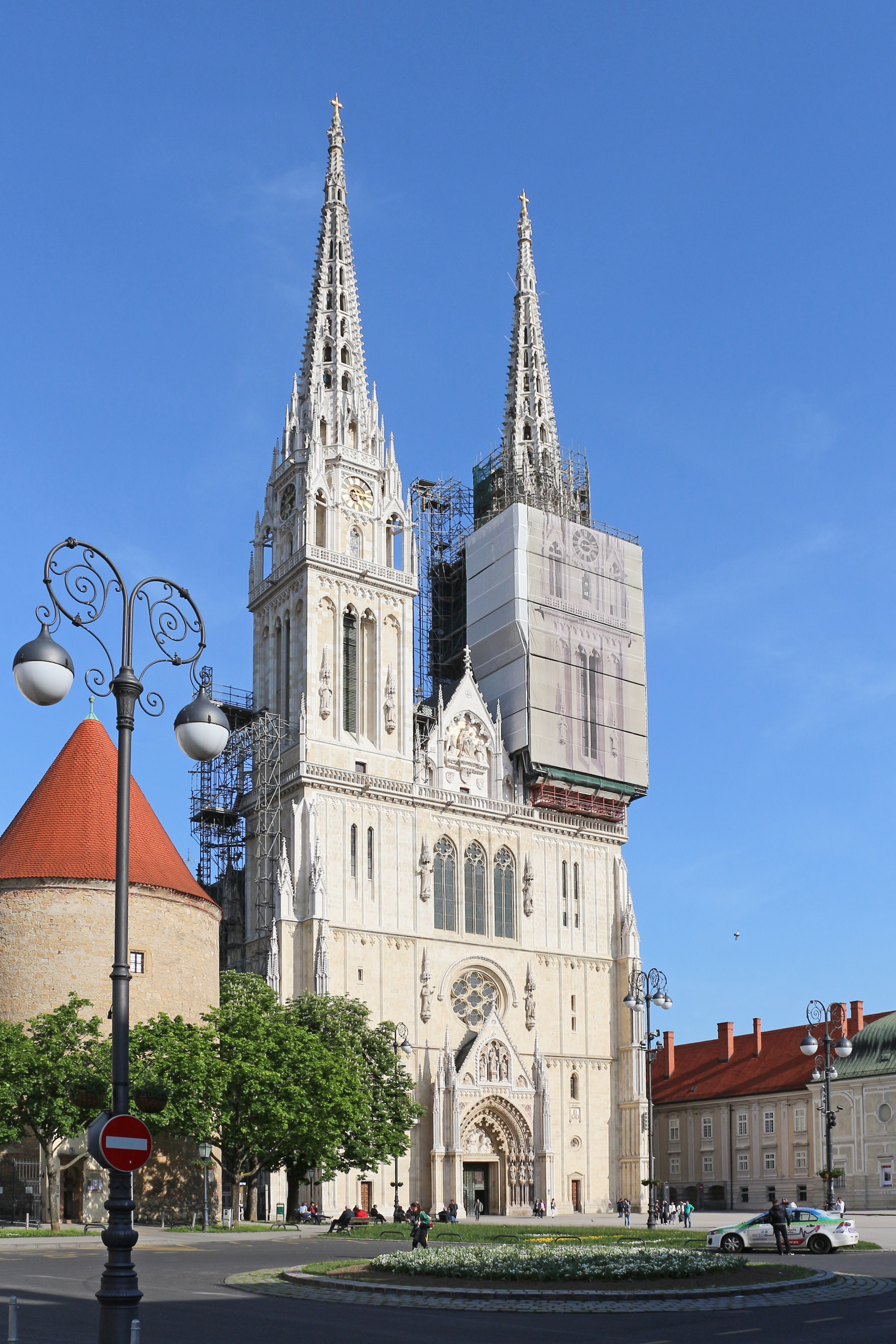
Zagreb Cathedral in Zagreb, widely regarded as the religious center of Catholicism in Croatia due to its status as the seat of the Archbishop of Zagreb.

Religion in Croatia refers to the religious beliefs, institutions, practices, and historical traditions present in the Republic of Croatia. Religion has played a central role in Croatian cultural, political, and national development for over a millennium. The country is predominantly Christian, with the vast majority of believers identifying as members of the Catholic Church. Other religious communities include the Serbian Orthodox Church, various Protestant denominations, Islam, Judaism, and a growing number of people who identify as non-religious.

Croatia's religious landscape reflects its position at the crossroads of Central Europe, the Balkans, and the Mediterranean, where Western Catholic, Eastern Orthodox, and Islamic influences have interacted for centuries. Christianity is the most widely professed religion in Croatia, representing 87.34% of the total population. A large majority of the Croats declare themselves to be members of the Catholic Church.

Croatia has no official religion and freedom of religion is a right defined by the country's Constitution, which also defines all religious communities as equal before the law and separate from the state.

== History ==
=== Pre-Christian Religion ===
Before the arrival of Christianity, the ancestors of the Croats practiced Slavic paganism. Their religious beliefs centered on the worship of natural forces, ancestral spirits, and a pantheon of deities associated with various aspects of life and nature. Among the most important gods were Perun, the deity of thunder and warfare, Veles, associated with the earth and the underworld, and Mokosh, a goddess linked to fertility and domestic life. These beliefs formed part of a broader Slavic religious tradition that was gradually displaced following the spread of Christianity.

=== Christianization of the Croats ===
According to Constantine VII, Christianization of Croats began in the 7th century. The conversion of Croatia is said to have been completed by the time of Duke Trpimir's death in 864. In 879, under duke Branimir, Croatia received papal recognition as a state from Pope John VIII. Hungarian historian László Veszprémy writes: "By the end of the 11th century, Hungarian expansion had secured Croatia, a country that was coveted by both the Venetian and Byzantine empires and had already adopted the Latin Christian faith. The Croatian crown was held by the Hungarian kings up to 1918, but Croatia retained its territorial integrity throughout. It is not unrelated that the borders of Latin Christendom in the Balkans have remained coincident with the borders of Croatia into present times".

The Christianization of the Croats began during the seventh and eighth centuries and proceeded gradually over several generations. Missionaries from both the Latin West and the Byzantine East contributed to the spread of the new faith. By the ninth century, Christianity had become firmly established among Croatian rulers and much of the population. The emerging Croatian state developed close ties with the Papacy and became integrated into the wider community of Western Christendom. Papal recognition of Croatian rulers strengthened these connections and reinforced the country's orientation toward the Latin Christian world.

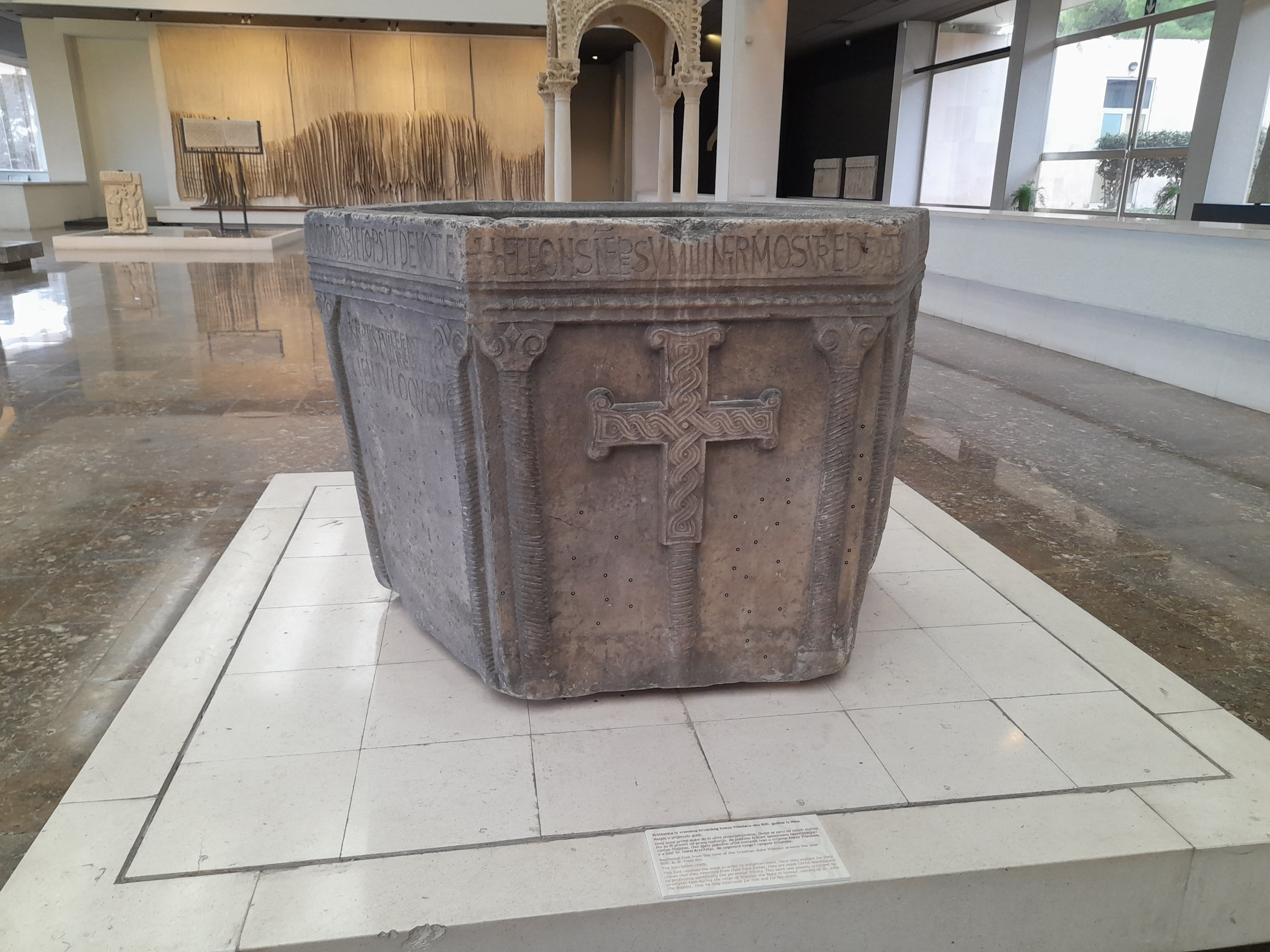
Baptismal font of Prince Višeslav (Višeslavova krstionica), it is one of the oldest and most significant surviving monuments connected to the Christianization of the Croats

The Baptismal font of Prince Višeslav, one of the earliest known Croatian rulers who governed around the year 800, is among the most significant surviving examples of early medieval Croatian ecclesiastical art. This hexagonal stone font is closely associated with the Christianization of the Croats and served as a vessel for baptism by immersion, a practice common during the early spread of Christianity in the region. An inscription carved along the rim of the font commemorates the sacrament of baptism and the conversion of believers to Christianity. It states that the font receives those who are spiritually weak and cleanses them of the sins inherited from their first parent, enabling them to become Christians through their profession of faith in the Holy Trinity. The inscription further records that the work was commissioned by a priest named John during the reign of Prince Višeslav in honor of Saint John the Baptist, whose intercession was sought for the ruler and his people. The font is also decorated with a carved cross intertwined with traditional Croatian interlace ornamentation, a motif that is commonly interpreted as a symbol of resurrection and the triumph of Christian faith.

=== Medieval Period ===
Throughout the Middle Ages, Roman Catholicism became deeply embedded in Croatian society and culture. Religious institutions played a vital role in preserving literacy, education, and learning, while monasteries and bishoprics served as important centers of political, economic, and cultural activity. The Church was also a major landowner and an influential force in public affairs.

A distinctive feature of medieval Croatian Christianity was the use of the Glagolitic script in certain liturgical services. Croatia was one of the few regions within the Roman Catholic world where the Roman rite could be celebrated in a Slavic language with papal approval. This tradition reflected the enduring influence of the missionary work of Saints Cyril and Methodius and contributed significantly to the development of Croatian religious and cultural identity.

=== Ottoman Period ===
The expansion of the Ottoman Empire into southeastern Europe during the fifteenth and sixteenth centuries profoundly affected Croatian lands. Large portions of Croatia became part of the frontier between the Ottoman and Habsburg realms, leading to frequent warfare and significant demographic changes. Many Catholic inhabitants fled regions threatened by Ottoman conquest, while new populations, including Orthodox Christians, settled in frontier areas. The Ottoman presence also introduced Islam to Croatian territories, although Muslims remained a minority population.

Religious institutions often suffered during periods of conflict, with some churches and monasteries being damaged or destroyed. Nevertheless, Catholicism remained a central component of Croatian identity, particularly in regions that remained under Habsburg control.

=== Habsburg Rule ===
Following the retreat of Ottoman power, Croatian territories increasingly came under the authority of the Habsburg Monarchy. During this period, the Catholic Church regained much of its influence and received substantial state support. New churches, monasteries, and religious institutions were established, while Baroque religious culture flourished throughout the region.

In the 16th century, Protestantism reached Croatia, but was mostly eradicated due to the Counter-Reformation implemented by the Habsburgs.

The Habsburg era also saw the consolidation of Orthodox communities, particularly within the Military Frontier, where many Orthodox settlers served as soldiers defending the empire's borders. Religious affiliation became increasingly intertwined with emerging ethnic and national identities, a development that would have lasting consequences in the centuries that followed.

=== Yugoslav Period ===
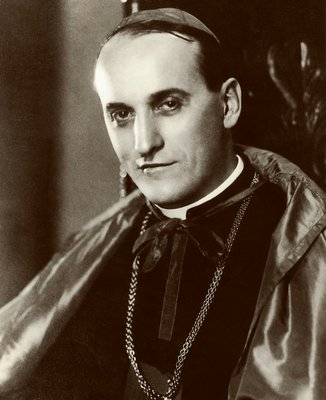
Aloysius Stepinac is a central figure in the Croatian Catholic Church because he became a symbol of loyalty to Vatican and resistance to communist control, and after serving as Archbishop of Zagreb during World War II, he was tried and convicted by the Yugoslav communist government in 1946 in what many consider a politically motivated trial, spending years in prison and house arrest until his death in 1960.

The creation of the Kingdom of Yugoslavia in 1918 brought together diverse religious communities, including Catholics, Orthodox Christians, Muslims, Jews, and Protestants, within a single state. Religious differences often intersected with broader national and political tensions, particularly between Croats and Serbs.

Following the Second World War, the establishment of socialist Yugoslavia under communist rule transformed the relationship between religion and the state. The government promoted secularism and sought to reduce the public influence of religious institutions. Religious education was largely removed from public life, church property was sometimes confiscated, and clergy were subject to state oversight. As a result, religious participation declined in many urban areas. Despite these restrictions, religious communities continued to play an important role in preserving cultural traditions and local identities. The Catholic Church, in particular, remained an important symbol of Croatian national consciousness during the socialist period.

There is also significant history of the Jews in Croatia through the Holocaust. The history of the Jews in Croatia dates back to at least the 3rd century, although little is known of the community until the 10th and 15th centuries. By the outbreak of World War II, the community numbered approximately 20,000 members, most of whom were murdered during the Holocaust that took place on the territory of the Nazi puppet state called Independent State of Croatia. After World War II, half of the survivors chose to settle in Israel, while an estimated 2,500 members continued to live in Croatia. According to the 2011 census, there were 509 Jews living in Croatia, but that number is believed to exclude those born of mixed marriages or those married to non-Jews. More than 80 percent of the Zagreb Jewish community were thought to fall in those two categories.

=== Independent Croatia ===
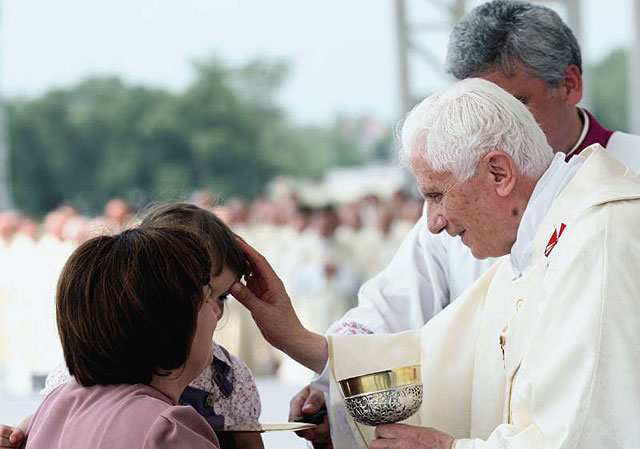
Pope Benedict XVI in Zagreb, June 2011

Following the declaration of independence in 1991, religion once again assumed a more prominent place in Croatian public life. The Constitution guaranteed freedom of religion and established a legal framework for cooperation between the state and recognized religious communities. Agreements between the government and various religious organizations regulated issues such as education, marriage recognition, and public funding.

Since independence, the Catholic Church has remained one of the most influential institutions in Croatian society. The period also witnessed a renewed public interest in the legacy of Cardinal Aloysius Stepinac, the wartime Archbishop of Zagreb, who became a symbol of Catholic resistance to communist persecution and an important figure in Croatian religious and national memory. His beatification by Pope John Paul II in 1998 further strengthened his significance within Croatian Catholicism.

At the same time, Croatia has maintained legal protections for religious minorities, including Orthodox Christians, Muslims, Protestants, and Jews. The contemporary religious landscape is characterized by the coexistence of strong Catholic traditions, increasing secularization among parts of the population, and growing religious diversity.

== Demographics ==
According to the 2021 census 83.04% of residents residing in Croatia are Catholics, while Orthodox Christians make up 3.35% of the population, Muslims 1.32%, and Protestants 0.26% of the population. 6.39% of Croatians are not religious, atheists or agnostics and 3.86% are undeclared.

Religion	2011		2021	
Religion	Number	%	Number	%
Christianity	3,914,900	91.34	3,383,046	87.38
— Catholicism	3,697,143	86.26	3,215,177	83.04
— Orthodox	190,143	4.44	129,820	3.35
— Protestantism	14,653	0.34	9,956	0.26
— Other Christians	12,961	0.30	28,063	0.73
Islam	62,977	1.47	50,981	1.32
Judaism	536	0.01	573	0.02
Eastern religions	2,550	0.06	3,392	0.09
Other religions	2,555	0.06	37,066	0.96
No religion	195,893	4.57	247,149	6.39
Undeclared/Unknown	105,478	2.46	149,626	3.86
Total	4,284,889	100.00%	3,871,833	100.00%

== Christianity ==
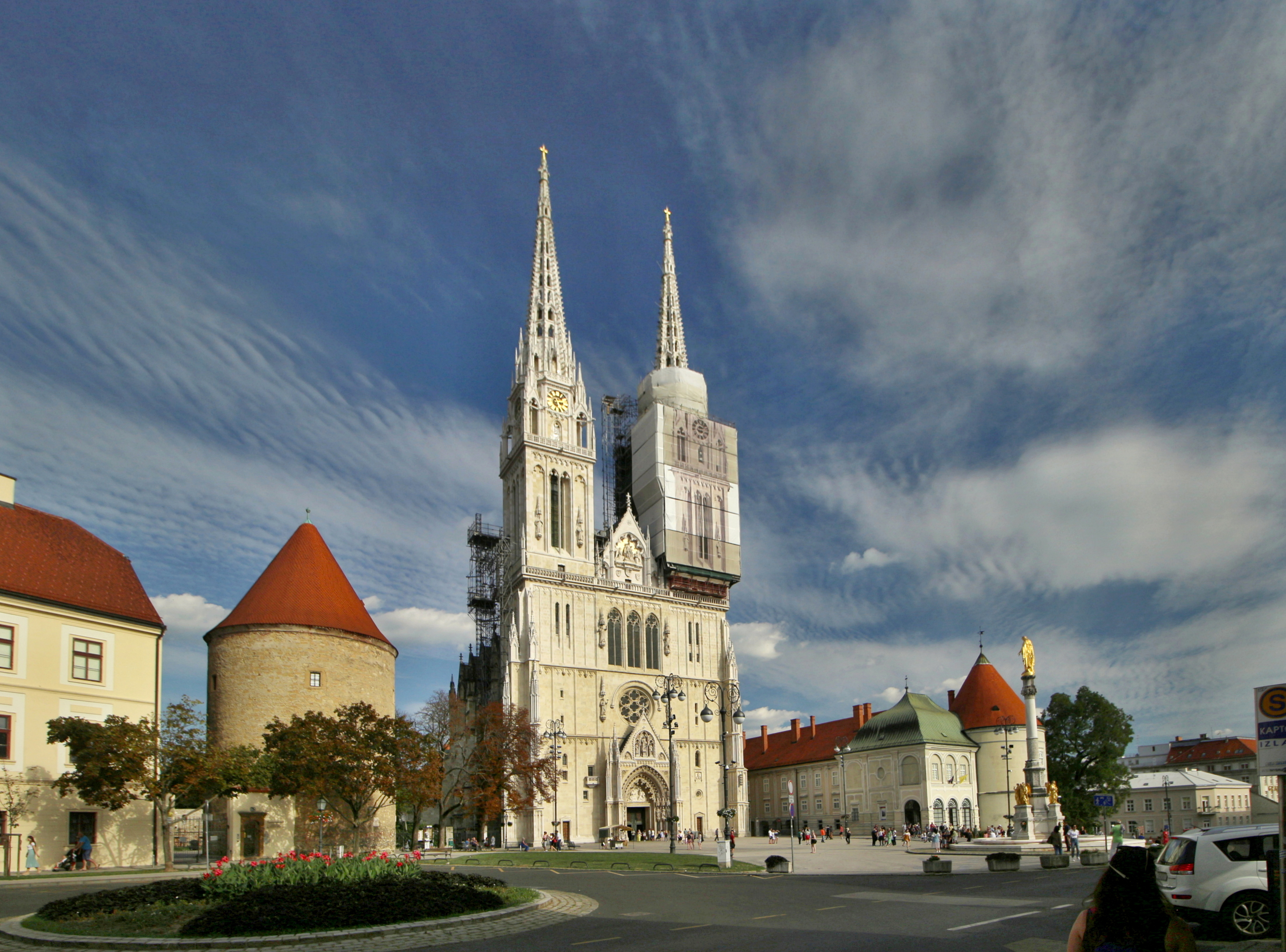
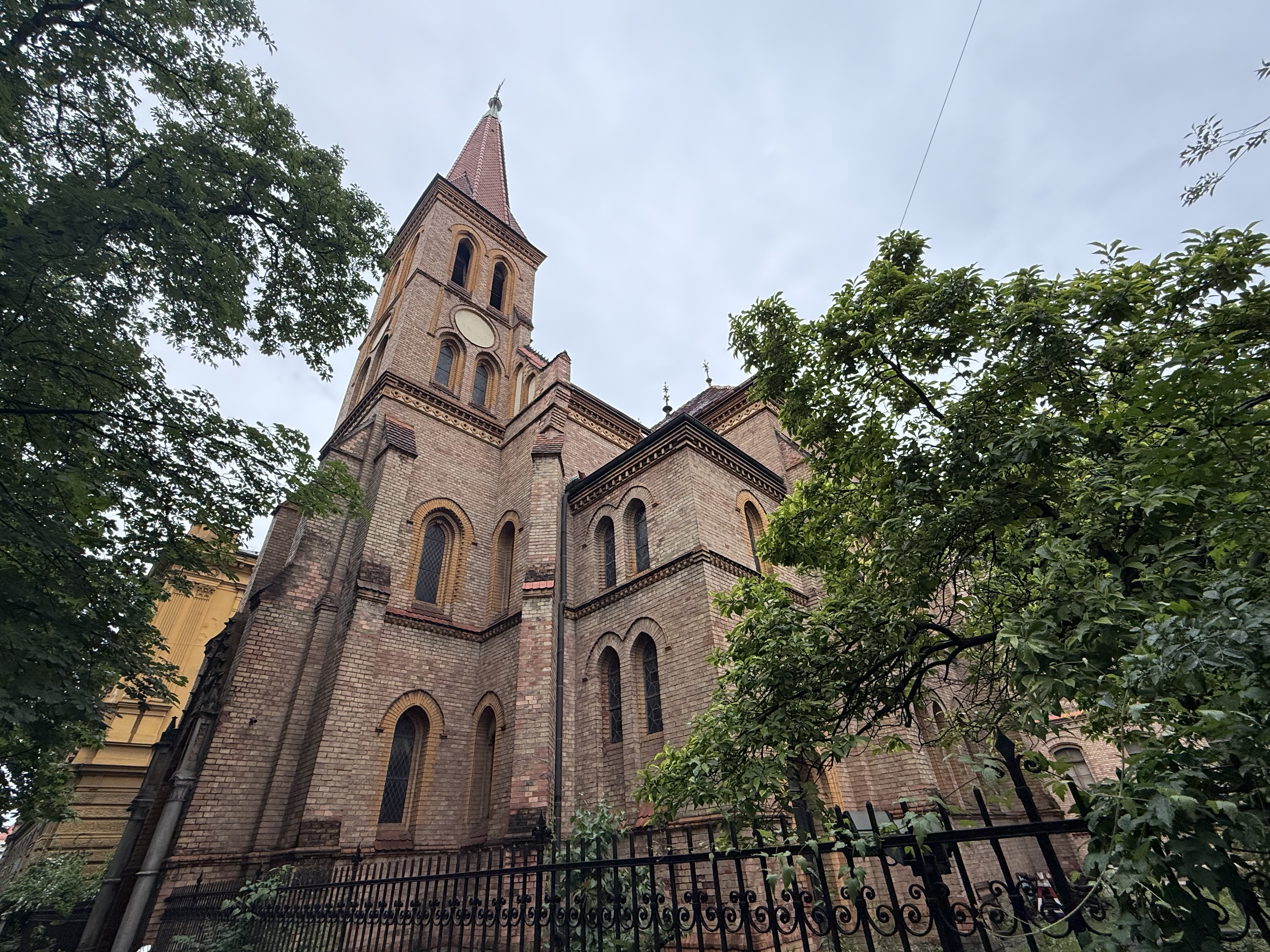
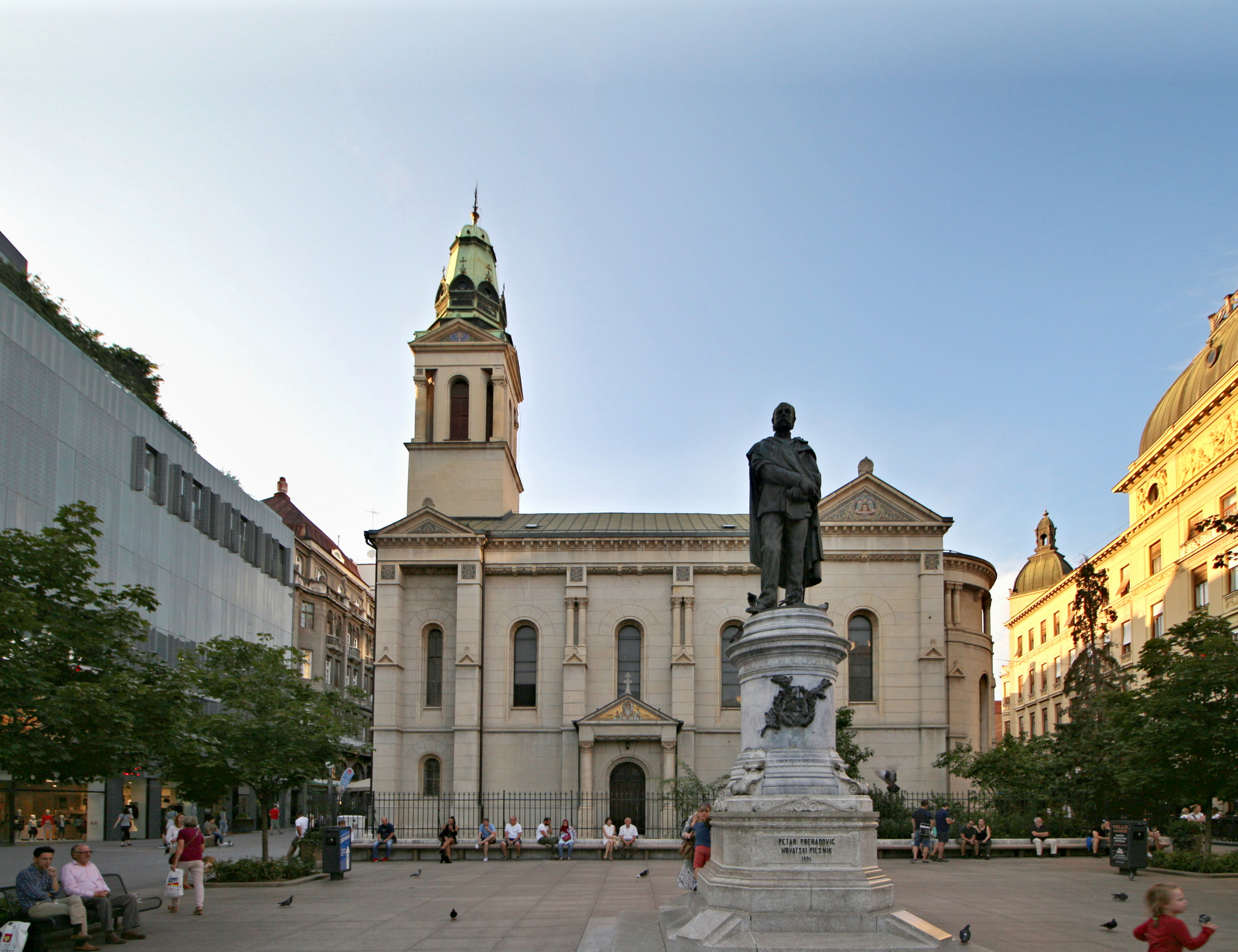
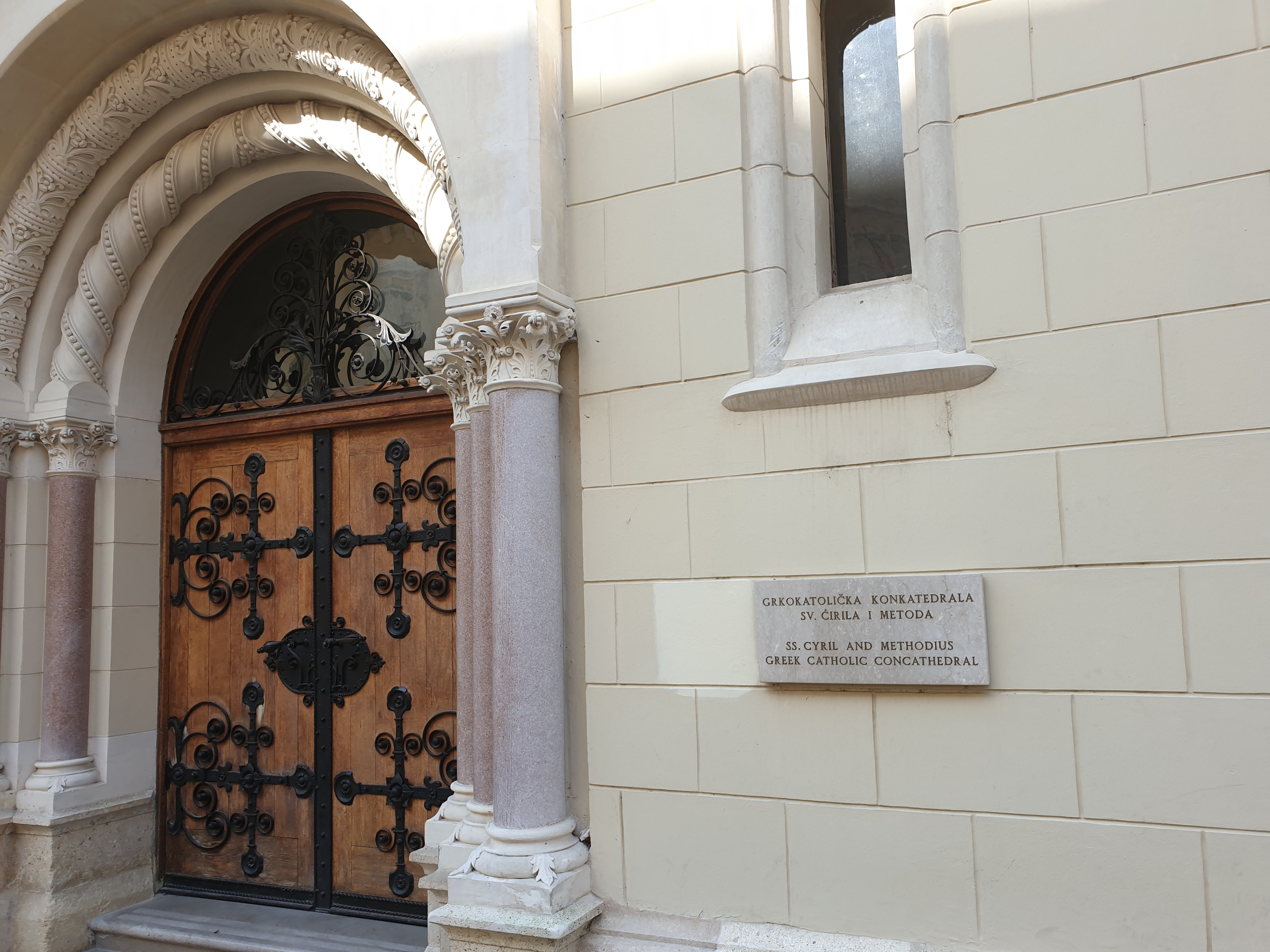
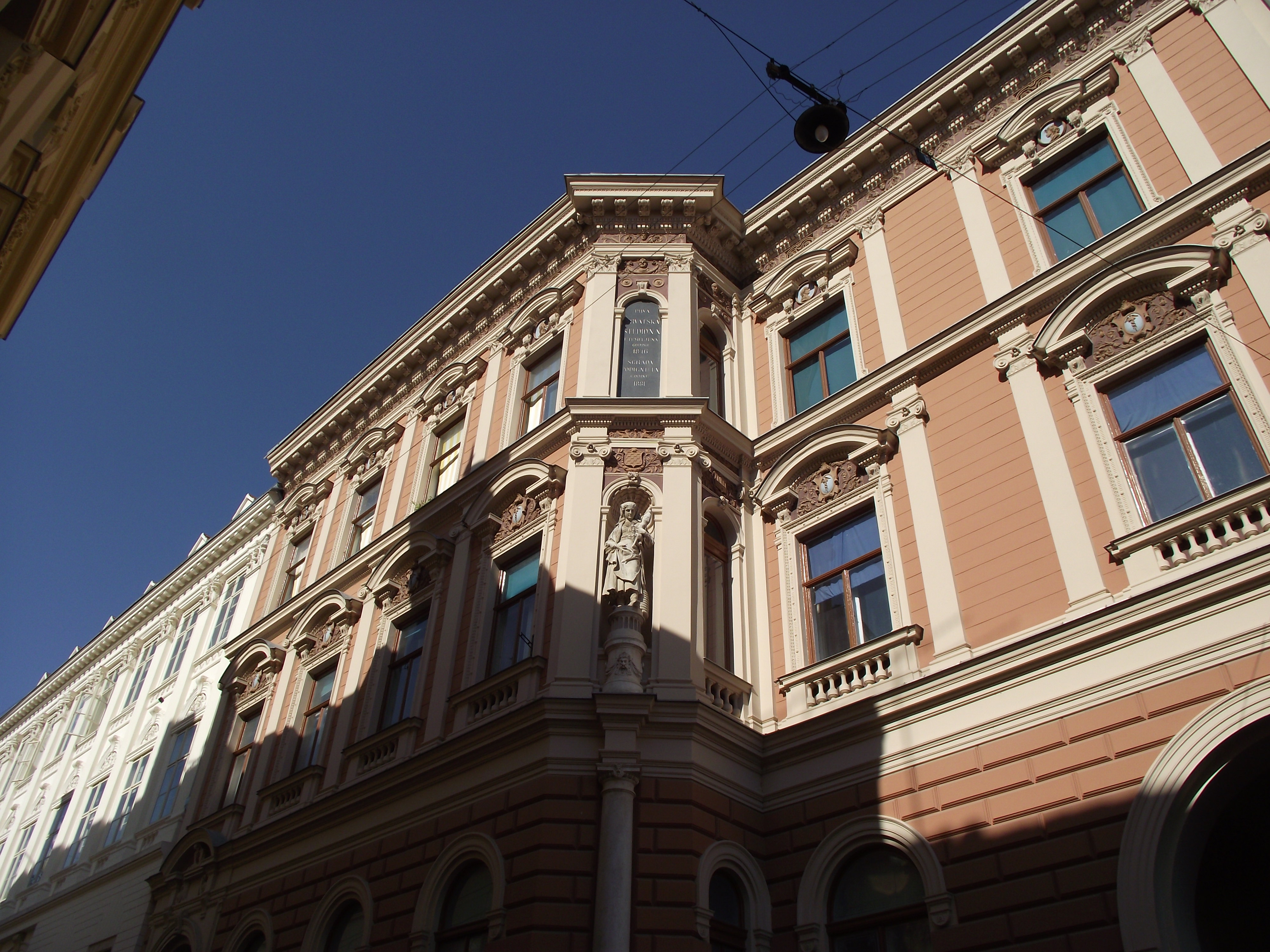
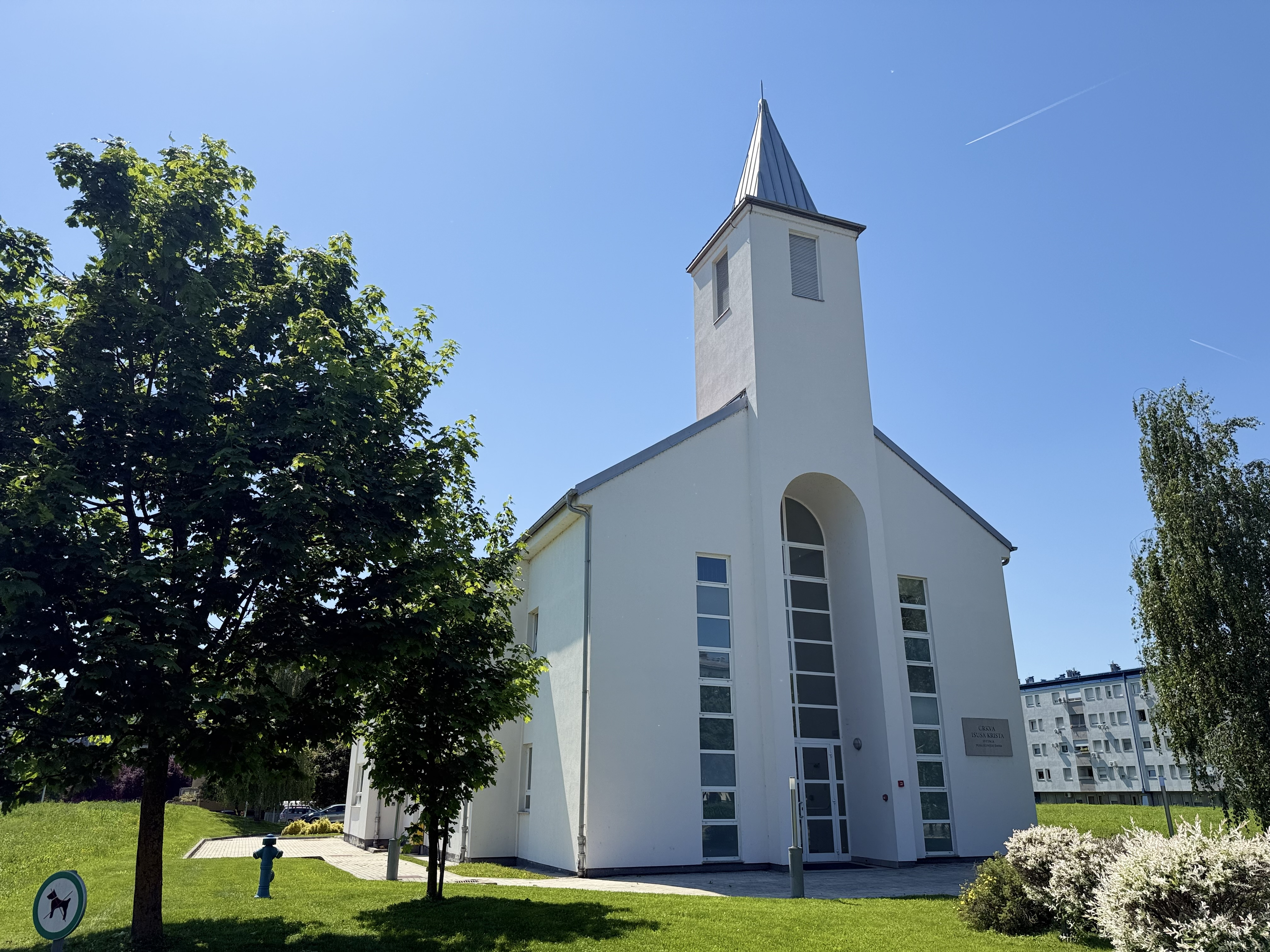
Clockwise, from upper left: Zagreb Cathedral, Evangelical Church, Zagreb, Greek Catholic Co-Cathedral of Saints Cyril and Methodius, Zagreb, The Church of Jesus Christ of Latter-day Saints, Baptists Church and Cathedral of the Transfiguration of the Lord

Christianity is the largest religion in Croatia, comprising the vast majority of the population. According to the 2021 Croatian census, approximately 78.97% of residents identified as Christians, with the overwhelming majority belonging to the Roman Catholic Church. Christianity has played a central role in Croatian history, culture, national identity, and social life since the early Middle Ages.

The Catholic Church is by far the largest Christian denomination in Croatia, accounting for approximately 79% of the population. Other Christian communities include the Serbian Orthodox Church, Protestant churches, Eastern Catholic churches, and various smaller evangelical and independent Christian groups.

Christianity was introduced to the territory of present-day Croatia during the Roman period. The religion became firmly established among the Croats following their conversion between the 7th and 9th centuries. During the medieval period, Croatia developed as a predominantly Catholic kingdom closely connected with the Holy See and Western Christendom. The Catholic Church remained a major cultural and political institution throughout the centuries of Habsburg, Venetian, and Ottoman influence.

According to the 2021 census, the largest Christian denominations in Croatia are:

- Catholic Church in Croatia – 3.06 million members (78.97% of the population)
- Serbian Orthodox Church in Croatia – 123,000 members (3.17%)
- Protestant churches (including Lutheran, Reformed, Baptist, Pentecostal, and other evangelical communities) – 14,000 members (0.36%)
- Greek Catholic Church of Croatia and Serbia – 6,000 members
- Other Christian churches and independent Christian communities – several thousand members

Although Christianity remains the dominant religion in Croatia, levels of religious observance vary. Census data and sociological studies indicate that while a large majority of Croatians identify as Christian, regular church attendance is considerably lower than nominal religious affiliation. Nevertheless, Christian traditions continue to influence Croatian public holidays, cultural customs, education, and national ceremonies.

Croatia recognizes several Christian holidays as public holidays, including Christmas, Easter Monday, Corpus Christi, the Assumption of Mary, All Saints' Day, and St. Stephen's Day. Christian symbols, churches, monasteries, and religious festivals remain prominent features of Croatia's cultural heritage and landscape.

=== Protestantism ===
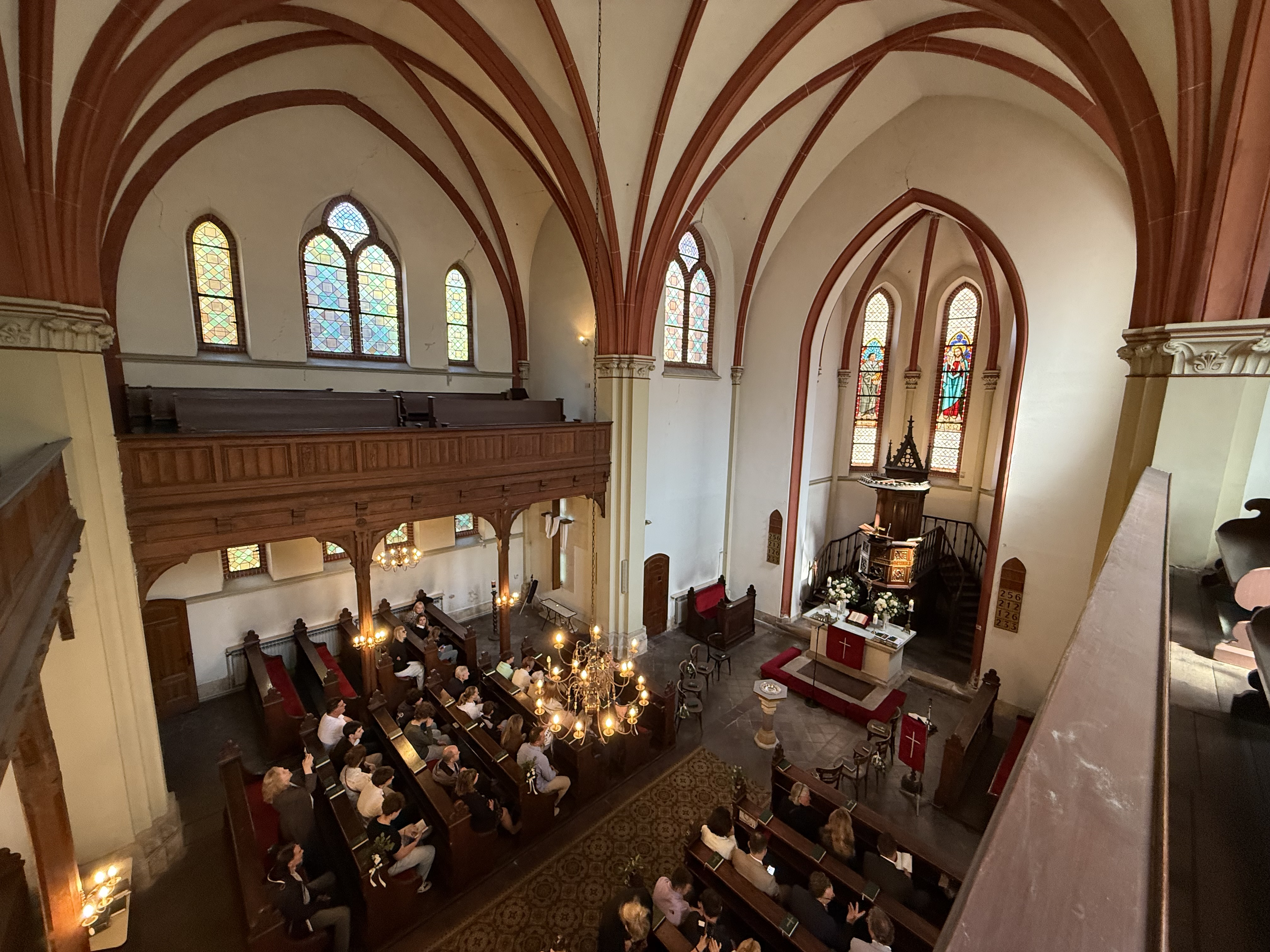
Interior of Evangelical Church, Zagreb

Some of the smaller Christian communities of Protestant origin have been present in this region for five centuries (Evangelical, Lutheran, Reformed, Calvinist). Many have been present for more than a century (Baptist Church, Churches of Christ, Pentecostal churches). The Adventist Christian Church, which refers to its Protestant roots, has also been present in Croatia for more than a century.

Protestantism is a minority branch of Christianity in Croatia, accounting for less than 1% of the population. According to the 2021 Croatian census, approximately 14,000 people identified with Protestant churches, representing about 0.36% of the country's population. Despite its relatively small size, Protestantism has a history in Croatia dating back to the Reformation of the 16th century.

The ideas of the Protestant Reformation reached the Croatian lands during the 16th century through contacts with neighboring regions of the Holy Roman Empire and the Kingdom of Hungary. Reformers influenced by the teachings of Martin Luther and John Calvin established communities in parts of northern Croatia and Slavonia. The movement attracted support among certain nobles, intellectuals, and urban populations.

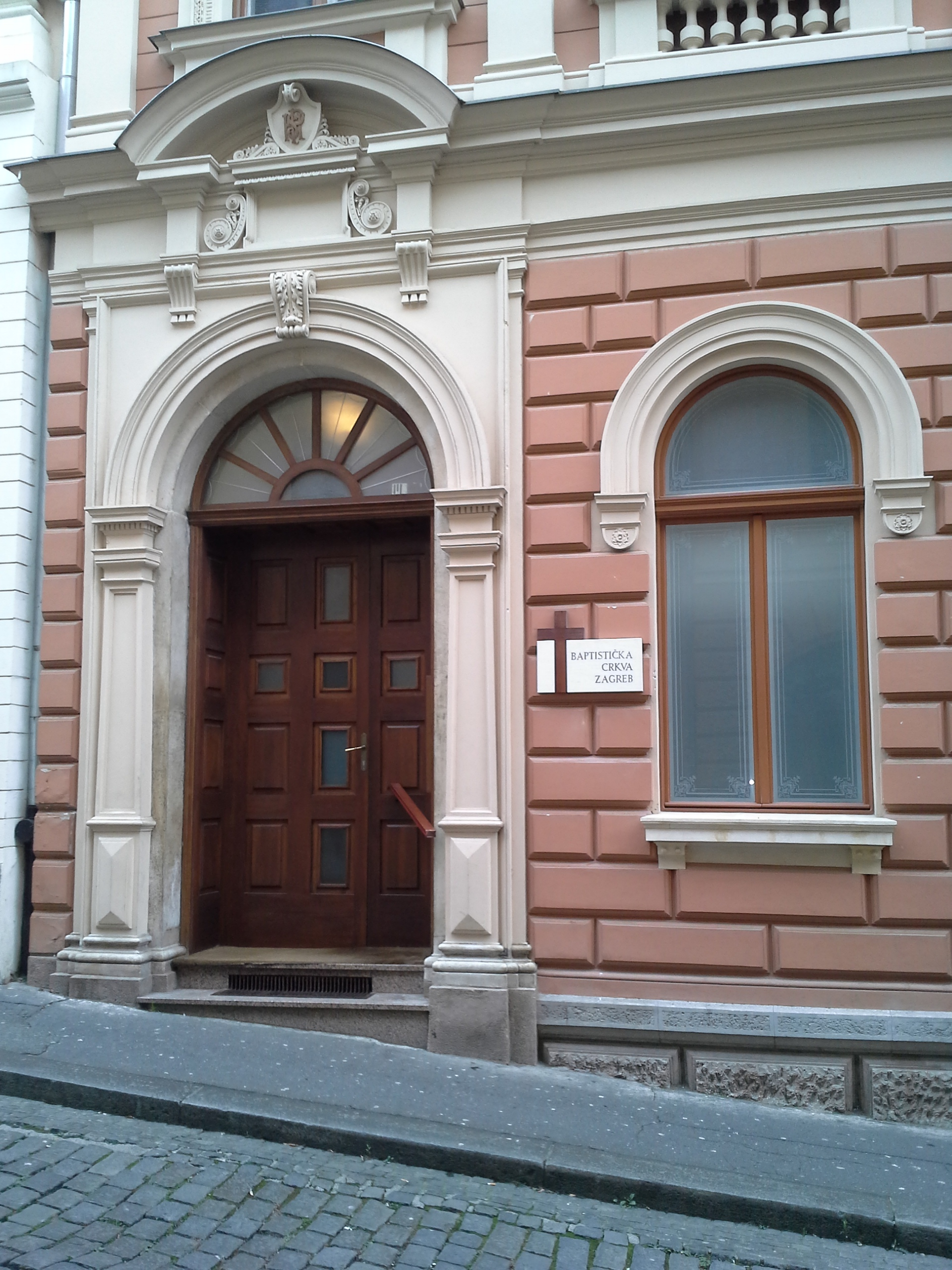
Baptist Church, in Upper Town, Zagreb

One of the most important centers of Protestant activity among South Slavs was the town of Urach near Tübingen in present-day Germany, where Croatian Protestant writers and translators published religious works in the Glagolitic, Cyrillic, and Latin scripts. These publications sought to spread Reformation teachings among Croats and other South Slavic peoples. The growth of Protestantism was limited by the Counter-Reformation led by the Catholic Church and the Habsburg authorities. By the late 16th and early 17th centuries, most Protestant communities in Croatia had either disappeared or returned to Catholicism.

Modern Protestant communities in Croatia emerged primarily during the 18th and 19th centuries through the settlement of German, Hungarian, Slovak, and other Protestant populations within the Habsburg Monarchy. These communities established Lutheran and Reformed congregations, particularly in Slavonia, Baranja, and other parts of eastern Croatia. Today, Protestant churches in Croatia include Lutheran, Reformed (Calvinist), Baptist, Pentecostal, Adventist, Methodist, and various evangelical denominations. Most Protestant communities are concentrated in northern and eastern Croatia, although congregations exist throughout the country.

=== Roman Catholic Church ===
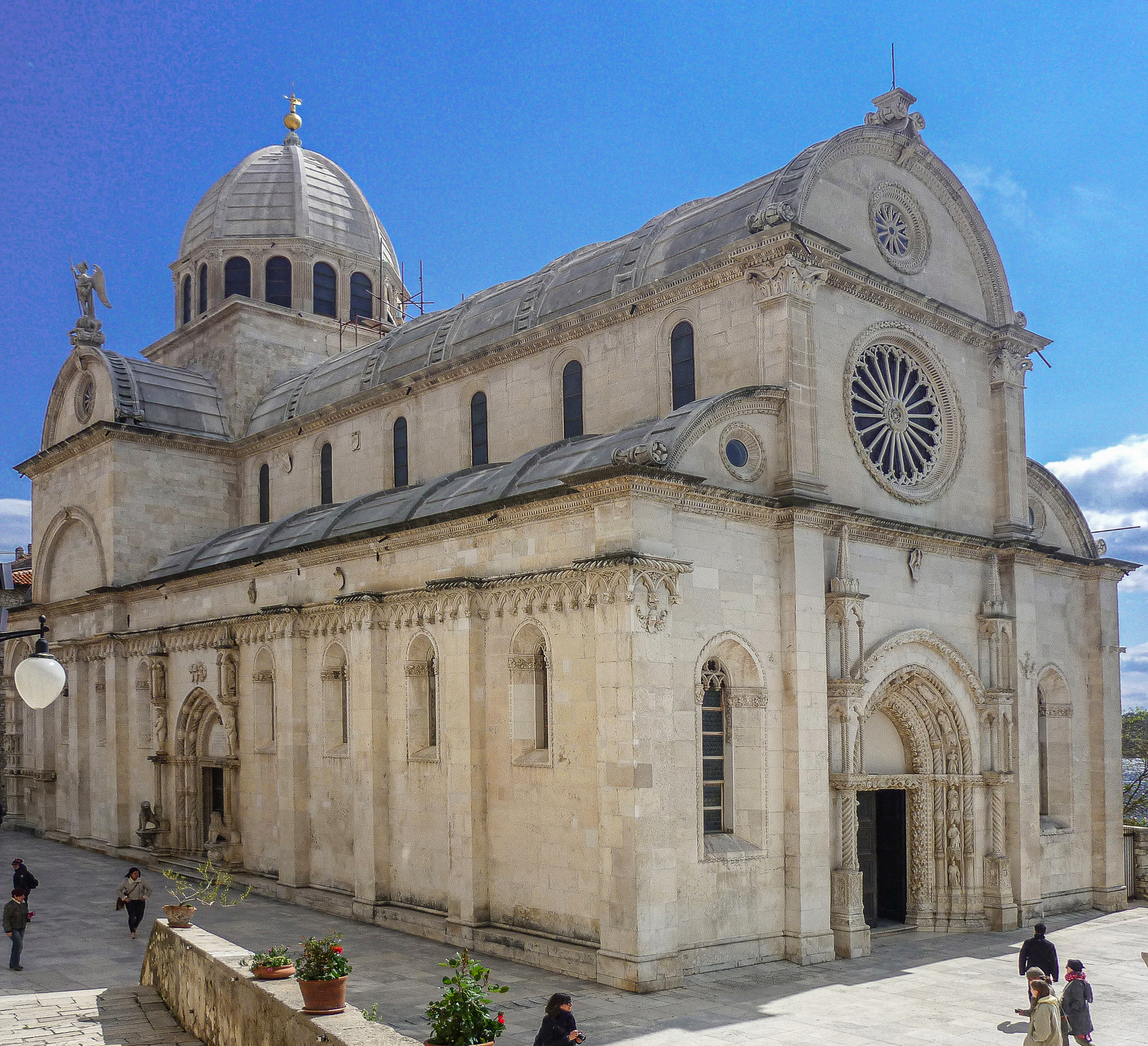
Šibenik Cathedral in Šibenik, built in 1536, is a part of UNESCO World Heritage Site

Roman Catholicism is the largest Christian denomination in Croatia, with over 78.97% of the population declaring as Catholics, according to 2021 Croatian census. Catholicism was introduced to the Croatian lands during the early Middle Ages and remains the faith of the majority of the population. The Catholic Church occupies a central place in the religious life of many Croatians and maintains an extensive network of parishes, dioceses, educational institutions, charitable organizations, and religious communities. The Latin Church in Croatia is administered by the Croatian Bishops' Conference centered in Zagreb, and it comprises five archdioceses, 13 dioceses and one military ordinariate.

After Croatia declared its independence from Yugoslavia, the Catholic Church regained its full freedom and influence. First nuncio in Croatia was Mons. Giulio Einauldi, appointed on 13 January 1992. Croatian Bishops' Conference was founded on 15 May 1993, by exclusion from the Bishops' Conference of Yugoslavia. Throughout Croatia, numerous churches, cathedrals, monasteries, and chapels serve as important religious and cultural landmarks. Notable examples include Zagreb Cathedral, one of the country's most recognizable religious monuments, and the Cathedral of St. James in Šibenik, Cathedral of Saint Domnius in Split, Trogir Cathedral in Trogir and Euphrasian Basilica in Poreč are part of UNESCO World Heritage Site.

Pilgrimage is an important aspect of Croatian Catholic life, with thousands of believers visiting shrines each year. The most significant pilgrimage site is the Marija Bistrica Shrine, dedicated to the Blessed Virgin Mary and home to the revered Black Madonna. Other important shrines include Trsat Sanctuary and Our Lady of Sinj Sanctuary. Catholic traditions strongly influence Croatian culture through religious festivals, saints' feast days, Christmas and Easter celebrations, processions, sacred music, and local customs. The Church continues to play an important role in education, charitable work, and the preservation of Croatia's cultural heritage.

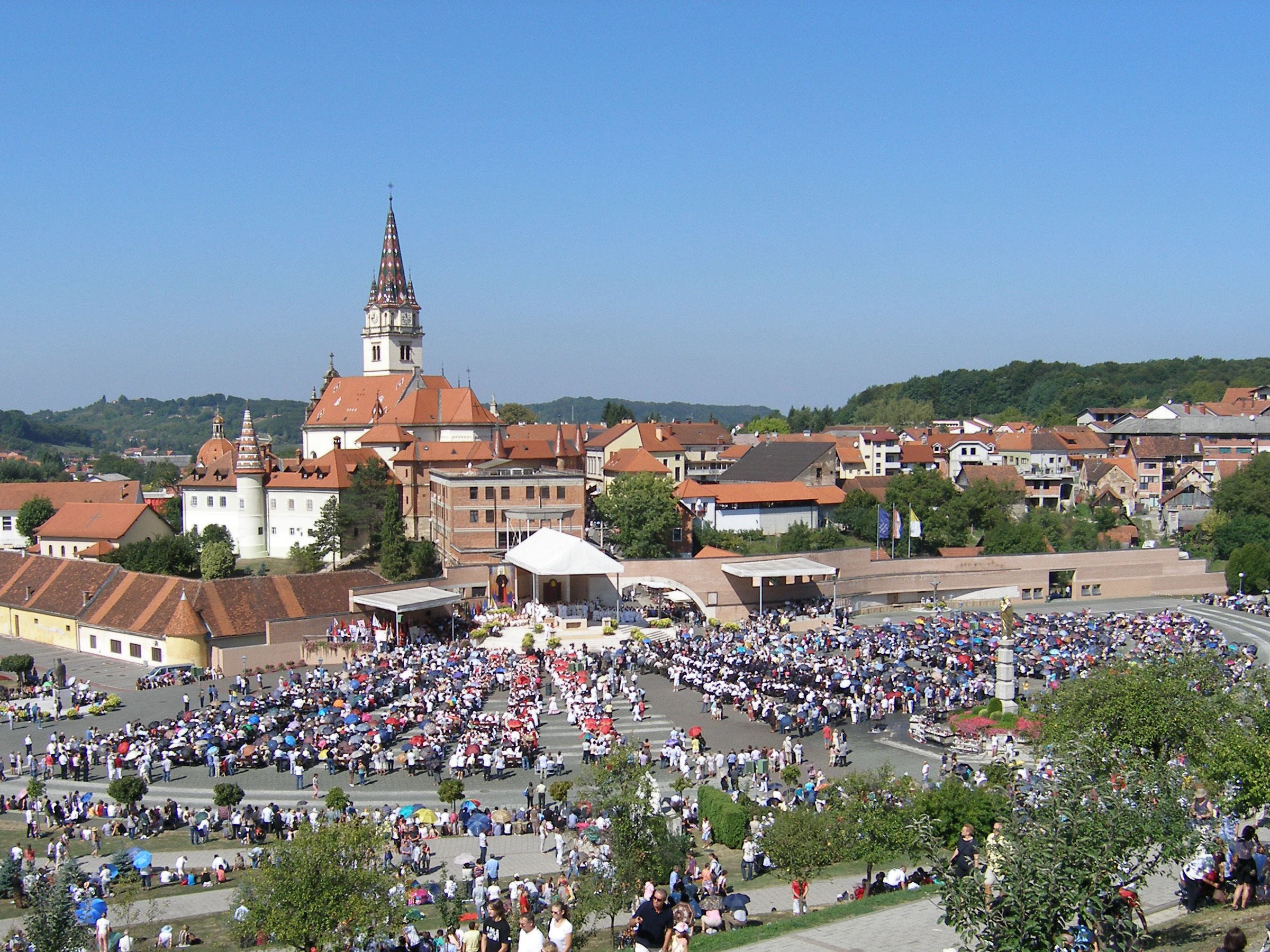
Pilgrimages to the Shrine of Our Lady of Marija Bistrica, Croatia's most important Catholic pilgrimage site

The Roman Catholic Church has had a profound influence on Croatian society, not only through its religious institutions but also through major papal visits that became significant national events. Croatia has been visited by two popes: Pope John Paul II, who visited three times (1994, 1998, and 2003), and Pope Benedict XVI, who visited in 2011. The first pope to visit the Croatian regions was Pope Alexander III, due to the storm that occurred on March 13, 1199. On his way to Venice, where he was supposed to meet with Emperor Frederick Barbarossa, the Pope had to take refuge on island of Vis due to infidelity. Pope John Paul II's first visit in 1994 took place shortly after Croatia gained independence and during the aftermath of the Croatian War of Independence. He described his journey as a "pilgrimage of peace and unity" and called for reconciliation, forgiveness, and national healing. In 1998, he beatified Alojzije Stepinac at the shrine of Marija Bistrica Shrine, strengthening Croatian Catholic identity and devotion. During his third visit in 2003, he celebrated large public Masses in cities including Dubrovnik, Osijek, Rijeka, and Zadar, attracting hundreds of thousands of worshippers.

Pope Benedict XVI visited Zagreb in 2011 under the motto "Together in Christ" and celebrated Mass at the Zagreb Hippodrome attended by approximately 300,000 faithful, one of the largest religious gatherings in modern Croatian history. These papal visits reinforced Croatia's Catholic heritage, encouraged religious participation, promoted family values and social solidarity, and contributed to the preservation of religious traditions, pilgrimage culture, sacred music, and public expressions of faith. The visits also strengthened Croatia's connection with the wider Catholic world and became important moments of national unity and cultural memory.

=== Greek Catholic Church ===
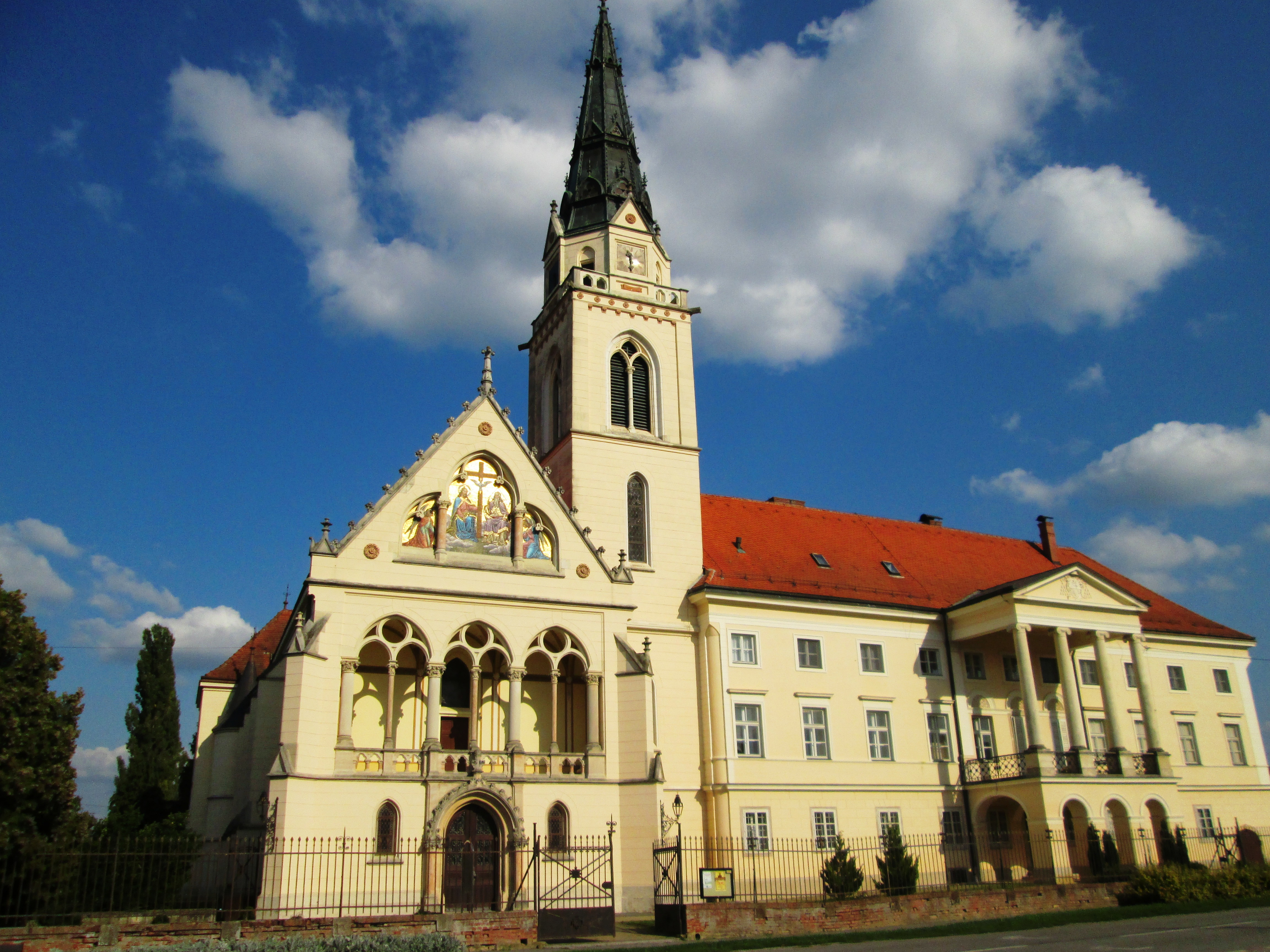
Greek Catholic Cathedral of the Holy Trinity in Križevci, seat of Greek Catholic Church in Croatia and Serbia

The Greek Catholic Church in Croatia traces its origins to 1611, when Bishop Simeon Vratanja entered into communion with the Catholic Church while preserving the Byzantine rite. This union led to the establishment of the Marča Eparchy, which united Byzantine-rite Catholics in the Kingdom of Croatia, Slavonia, and Dalmatia. The eparchy was centered at the Monastery of St. Michael the Archangel in Marčan and became the foundation of the present-day Greek Catholic Eparchy of Križevci, in Križevci.

Throughout the seventeenth and eighteenth centuries, the Greek Catholic community faced challenges from both Orthodox and Latin Church authorities regarding jurisdiction and ecclesiastical identity, while striving to maintain its Eastern liturgical traditions within communion with Rome. Important bishops such as Gabrijel Mijakić, Pavao Zorčić, and Bazilije Božičković strengthened the Church through education, seminary formation, and institutional development. In 1777, Pope Pius VI formally established the Greek Catholic Eparchy of Križevci, ensuring a stable legal and ecclesiastical structure for Greek Catholics. Over time, the eparchy expanded through the settlement of Rusyn and Ukrainian Greek Catholics, enriching its cultural and spiritual life. Today, the Križevci Eparchy serves Greek Catholics in Croatia, Bosnia and Herzegovina, and Slovenia, preserving the Byzantine liturgical heritage while remaining in full communion with the Holy See.

=== Eastern Orthodoxy ===
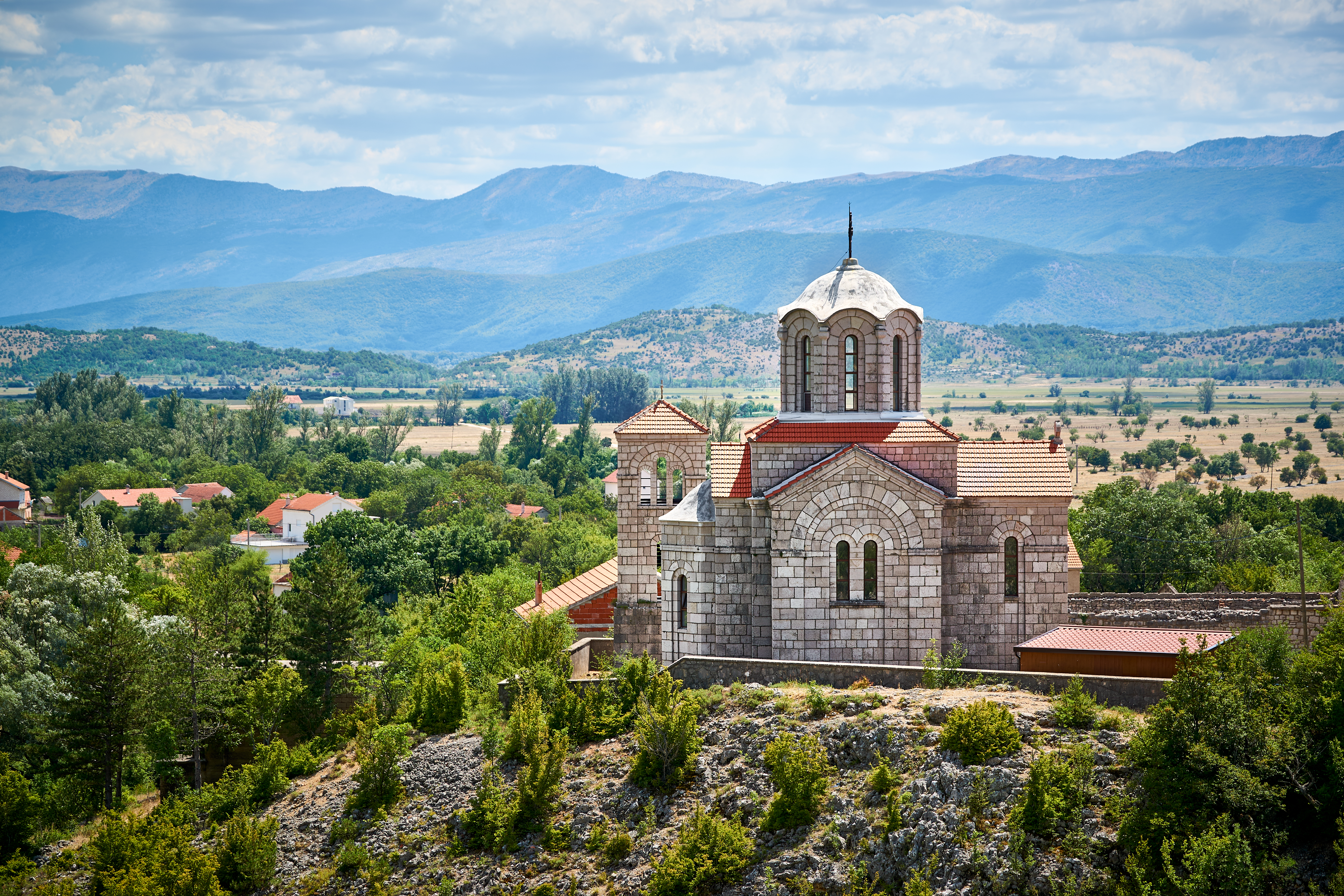
Serbian Orthodox Church of the Ascension of the Lord in Cetina

The Eastern Orthodoxy is the second-largest religious denomination in Croatia, behind the Catholic Church. According to the 2021 Croatian census, there were 128,395 adherents of Eastern Orthodoxy in Croatia, making up 3.3% of the population, majority of them being Serbian minority in Croatia. The Serbian Orthodox Church is the sole Eastern Orthodox canonical jurisdiction in the territory of Croatia, although Bulgarian Orthodox Church and Macedonian Orthodox Church are also recognized by the state.

Serbian Orthodox Church consists of the Metropolitanate of Zagreb and Ljubljana and the eparchies of Dalmatia, Gornji Karlovac, Slavonia, and Osijek and Baranja. There are over 600 Serbian Orthodox churches and other religious buildings in Croatia. During the Croatian War of Independence, 84 of these churches were damaged or destroyed. Of that number, 21 were completely demolished by explosives, 4 wooden churches were burned, 56 masonry churches were damaged or burned during and after the war and 3 churches were removed during or shortly after the conflict. By 2025, 42 of the 84 affected buildings had been reconstructed or rebuilt.

In the early 20th century, Crikvenica was home to one of the largest Russian émigré communities in the northern Adriatic, with more than 300 Russian-speaking residents recorded in the 1921 census after refugees fled the Russian Civil War. Their most enduring legacy is the Russian Orthodox Church of St. Nicholas, built in 1924, which remains a symbol of the community's historical and cultural presence in the town. After the Second World War, the Russian community gradually declined, and the Church of St. Nicholas was transferred to the Serbian Orthodox Church in 1948; today, the historic church still stands in Crikvenica as the only purpose-built Russian Orthodox church in Croatia, although regular Russian Orthodox services are no longer held there.

== Religious minorities ==
=== The Church of Jesus Christ of Latter-day Saints ===
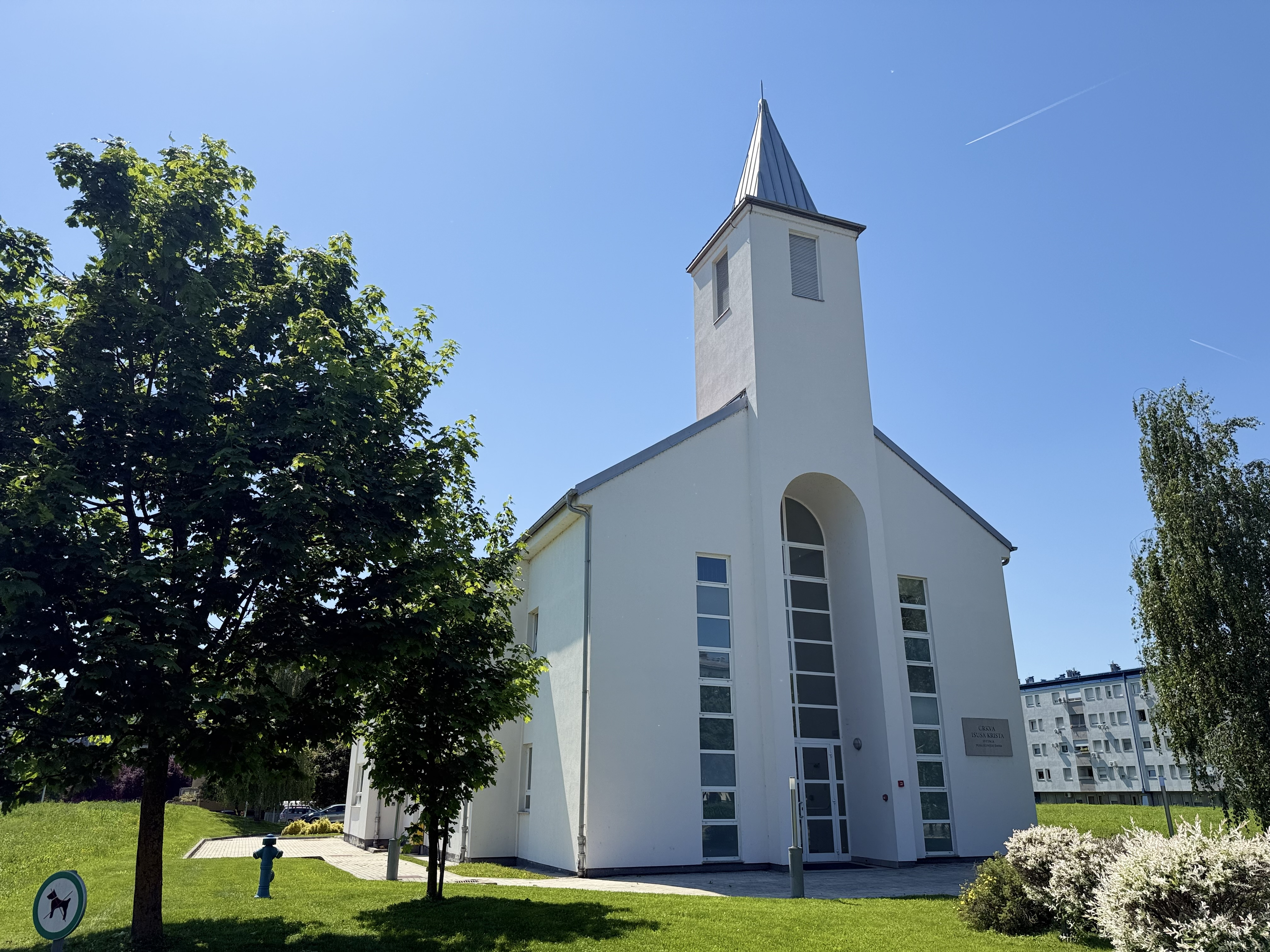
LSD Church in Jarun, Zagreb

The Church of Jesus Christ of Latter-day Saints in Croatia began their missionary work back in the 1970s and are closely associated with the renowned Croatian basketball player Krešimir Ćosić. He joined The Church of Jesus Christ of Latter-day Saints in 1971 while studying at Brigham Young University (BYU) in Provo, Utah, USA. During his time there, he was an outstanding member of the university’s basketball team, competing successfully in the American collegiate basketball league. Rather than pursuing a professional career in the NBA, Ćosić chose to return to what was then Yugoslavia because of his deep commitment to the Church and the gospel. Upon his return, he began missionary efforts first in Zadar and later in Zagreb.

By the mid-2000s, the Church had approximately 500 members in Croatia, with congregations in Zagreb, Osijek, Varaždin, Karlovac, Rijeka, Split, and Zadar, and plans to construct a purpose-built chapel in Zagreb's district of Vrbani reflected the community's gradual growth and institutional development. The Church places a strong emphasis on family life, missionary work, education, and community service, while its teachings are based on both the Bible and the Book of Mormon.

=== Jehovah's Witnesses ===
The Seventh-day Adventist Church, also known in Croatia as the “Subotari” (those who observe Saturday as the Sabbath), is a Protestant Christian denomination that emphasizes the expectation of Christ’s Second Coming and the study of the Bible. The movement originated in the United States in the 19th century through the teachings of William Miller and was later organized into the Seventh-day Adventist Church under the leadership of Ellen G. White, who introduced practices such as observing Saturday as the day of worship and promoting a healthy lifestyle.

Jehovah's Witnesses arrived in Croatia around 1924 and soon established congregations and prayer houses in major cities throughout the country. Today, the Church has 5,500 members of communities across Croatia and operates the Adventist Theological Seminary in Maruševec near Varaždin, which serves as an important educational institution. Jehovah's Witnesses in Croatia are recognized for their missionary activities, publishing work, and emphasis on Bible education, adult baptism by immersion, family values, and a lifestyle that avoids alcohol, tobacco, and certain foods.

=== Islam ===
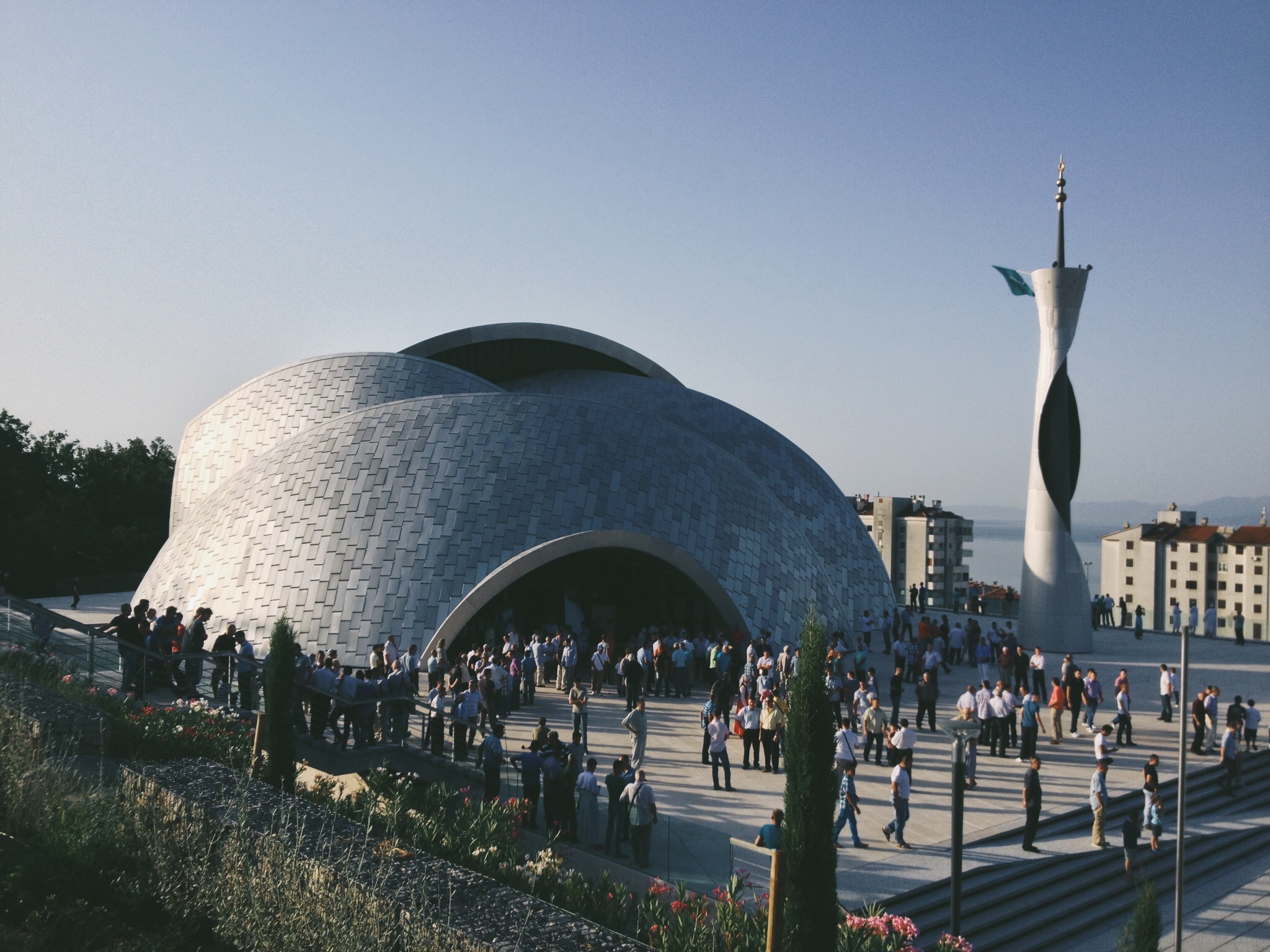
Rijeka Mosque in Rijeka

Islam has a long historical presence in Croatia and represents an important part of the country’s religious and cultural diversity. According to 2021 Croatian census, there were 50,981 muslims in Croatia, majority of them being Bosnian minority. A significant milestone in its history was the recognition of Islam as an officially acknowledged religion by the Croatian Parliament in 1916, making Croatia one of the earlier European countries to grant Islam such legal status. The connection between Croatian lands and the Islamic world also dates back to the Middle Ages. Herman of Dalmatia, a scholar familiar with Arabic and Islamic culture, contributed to the transmission of Islamic knowledge to medieval Europe and participated in the first Latin translation of the Quran.

The modern Muslim community in Croatia developed mainly during the 20th century, particularly through migration from Bosnia and Herzegovina and other parts of the former Yugoslavia. Today, Muslims form a minority in Croatia and are represented primarily by the Islamic Community of Croatia, which organizes religious, educational, and cultural activities. Relations between the Croatian state and the Islamic Community are regulated through agreements that provide rights such as religious education, institutional support, and recognition of major Islamic holidays, including Eid al-Fitr and Eid al-Adha as non-working days for Muslim believers.

The Zagreb Mosque and Islamic Cultural Center, opened in 1987, is the central Islamic institution in Croatia. Other Islamic cultural centers, including the Rijeka Mosque and Gunja Mosque have further contributed to the visibility and development of Muslim community life. Today, Islam in Croatia is recognized as a part of the country’s multicultural and religious landscape.

=== Judaism ===
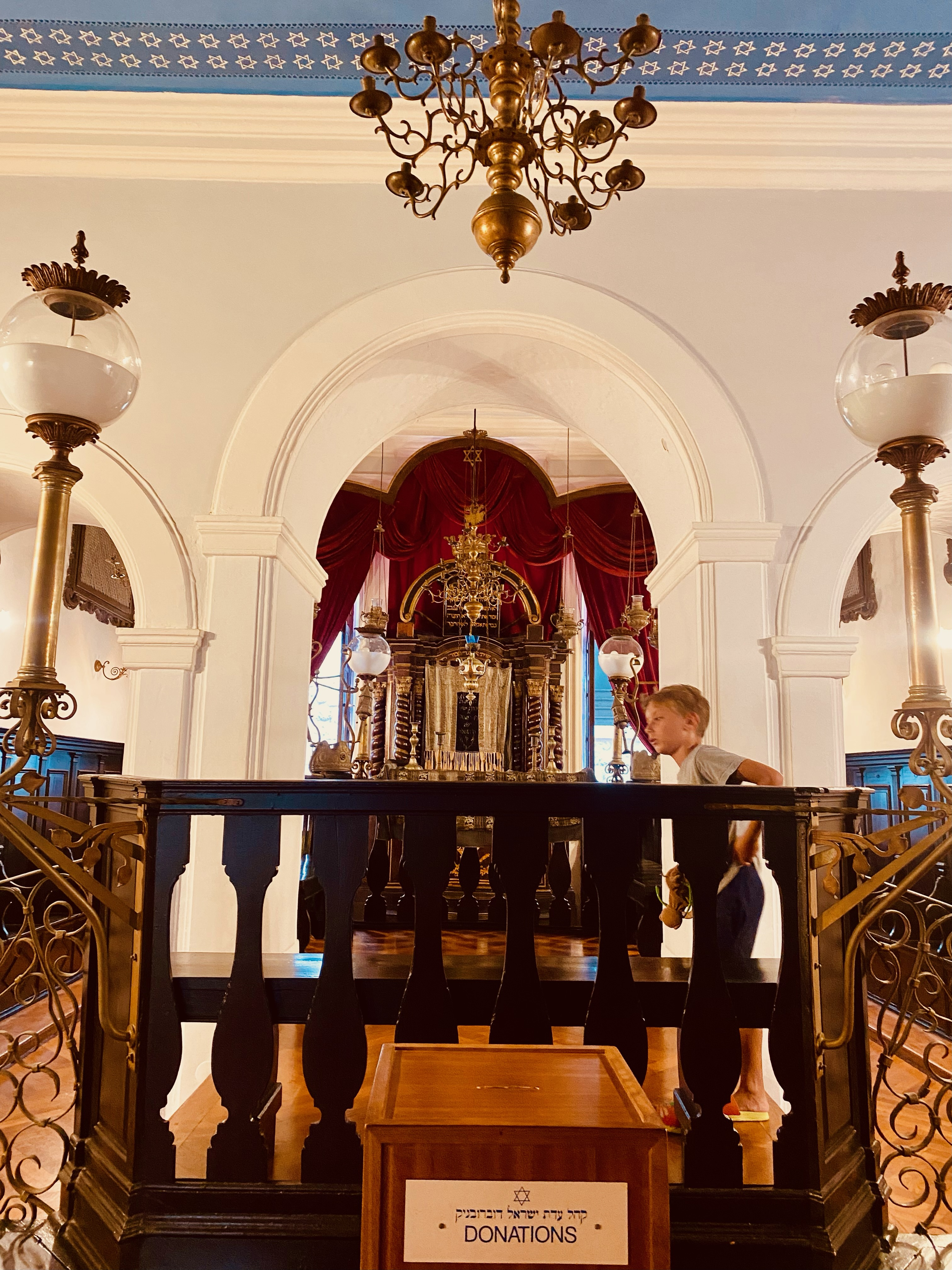
Dubrovnik Synagogue in Dubrovnik, the second oldest synagogue in Europe

Jewish presence in Croatia dates back to Roman times. Archaeological evidence, including a 3rd-century Jewish cemetery near ancient Salona (modern-day Solin), confirms the existence of early Jewish communities in the region. By the time Croats settled in the area in the 7th century, Jewish communities were already established. During the Middle Ages, Jewish communities flourished in cities such as Zagreb, Split, and Dubrovnik. Jews contributed significantly to trade and economic life, especially through connections with Italy and Central Europe. In Dubrovnik, a Jewish community developed under the influence of Sephardic Jews who arrived after their expulsion from Spain in 1492. By the 15th century, Dubrovnik had become an important center of Jewish trade and cultural life, with Jews playing a notable role in the city’s commercial networks. In Zagreb during the 13th and 14th centuries, the Jewish community had a degree of self-government under a leader known as the Magistratus Judaeorum. However, in 1456, Jews were expelled from the region and only began returning centuries later.

Following World War I, Croatian Jews became part of the Jewish communities of the newly formed Yugoslavia. Before World War II, approximately 20,000 Jews lived in Croatia, with Zagreb as the main center of Jewish life. This community was almost destroyed during the Holocaust by the Ustaša regime of the Independent State of Croatia, which persecuted, deported, and murdered the majority of Croatian Jews. After 1945, Jewish life slowly recovered, although many survivors emigrated, particularly to Israel. The breakup of Yugoslavia in the 1990s created new challenges, but Jewish communities in Croatia continued to rebuild and preserve their identity.

Today, Croatia’s Jewish population is estimated at around 500 people, with the majority living in Zagreb. Smaller communities exist in cities such as Osijek, Rijeka, Split, and Dubrovnik. Nine Jewish communities are organized under the Coordination of Jewish Communities in the Republic of Croatia. The Jewish Community of Zagreb remains the country’s cultural and religious center. Its facilities include a synagogue, library, archives, Holocaust research center, and cultural spaces. The community supports educational programs, social services, youth activities, Hebrew classes, cultural events, and heritage preservation projects. Besides the one in Zagreb, other active synagogues in Croatia are Dubrovnik Synagogue, Split Synagogue and Rijeka Orthodox Synagogue.

=== Buddhism ===
Knowledge of Buddhism in Croatia dates to the early seventeenth century through reports of Jesuit missionaries and references in Croatian literature. Among the earliest documented sources are the letters of the Jesuit missionary Nikola Ratkaj describing religious life in Tibet, as well as medieval adaptations of the Barlaam and Josaphat legend, whose origins can be traced to the life of the Buddha. During the nineteenth and early twentieth centuries, Buddhism became a subject of scholarly and public interest through publications, comparative studies of religion and philosophy, and the emergence of Indological scholarship. Early Croatian works on Buddhism appeared alongside translations of Indian literature and growing academic interest in Sanskrit and Asian cultures.

A major figure in the development of Buddhist studies was Čedomil Veljačić (Bhikkhu Ñāṇajīvako), philosopher, translator, and the first known person from the former Yugoslavia to receive Theravāda monastic ordination. Together with Radoslav Katičić and other scholars, he contributed to the establishment of Indology at the University of Zagreb in 1960, providing an academic framework for the study of Buddhism and Indian philosophy. The first sustained Buddhist practice groups emerged during the 1970s, particularly through the Mushindokai association, whose meditation and study activities later gave rise to several Buddhist communities. Following Croatia's independence, a number of Buddhist organizations were established, representing Tibetan, Chan (Zen), Shingon, and Theravāda traditions. Since the 1990s, Croatia has also hosted visits by prominent Buddhist teachers, and Buddhist philosophy has become a subject of study at Croatian universities and theological faculties.

Today, Buddhism in Croatia is represented by a small number of organizations and practice groups. Dharmaloka is the country's only officially registered Buddhist religious community, while other groups follow Tibetan Buddhist lineages (including Nyingma, Rimé, and Drikung Kagyu), the Japanese Shingon tradition, and Theravāda Vipassanā meditation. Although these traditions differ in doctrine and practice, they all belong to the broader Buddhist tradition.

=== Hinduism in Croatia ===
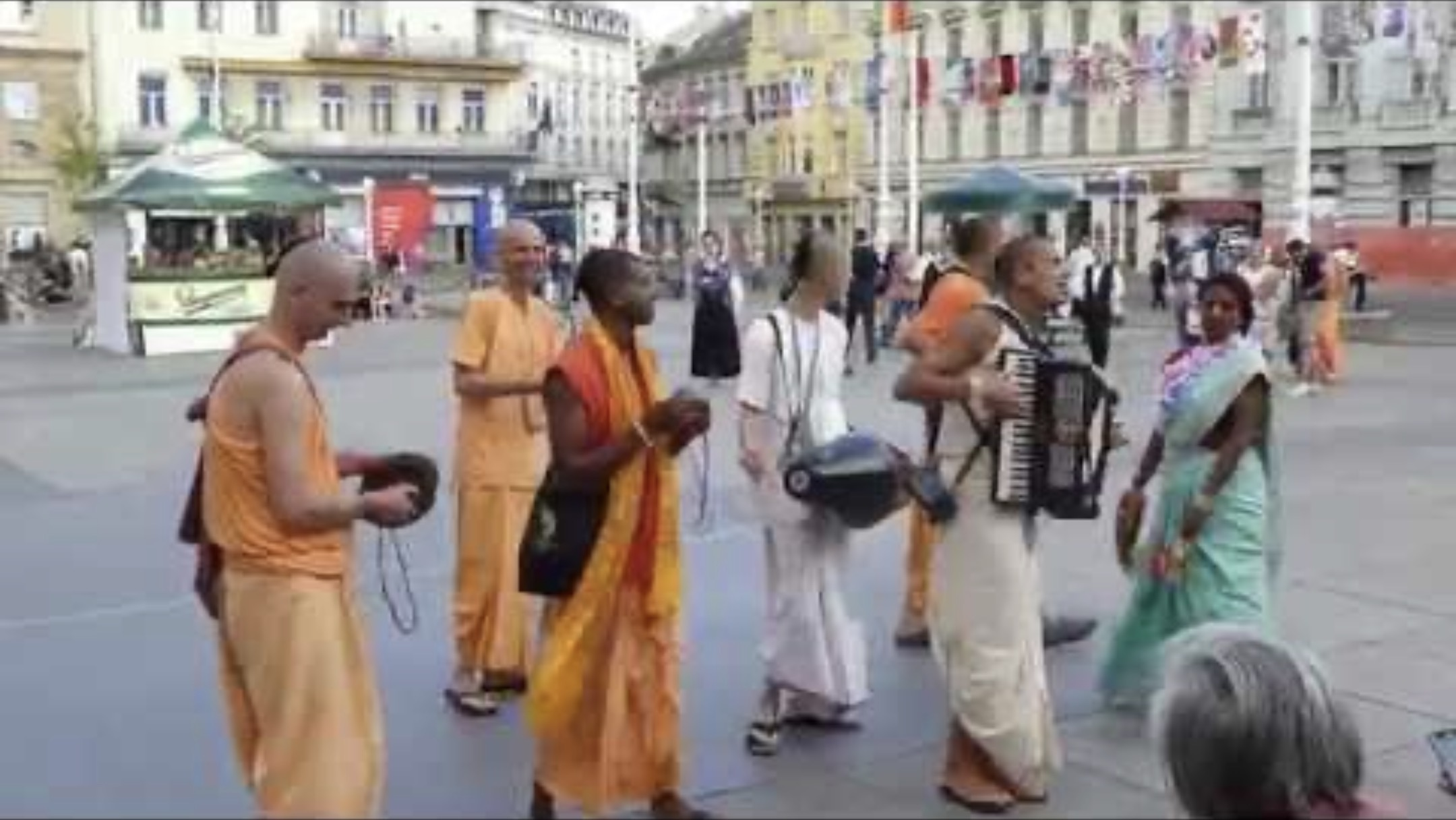
Hare Krishna in Zagreb

The Hindu Religious Community of Croatia (Hinduistička vjerska zajednica Hrvatske, HVZH) is a registered religious community based on the principles of Sanātana Dharma (the "eternal dharma" or Hindu tradition). Its origins in Croatia date to 1984, while it was formally registered as a religious community after Croatian independence. In 2019, the organization was granted special consultative status with the United Nations Economic and Social Council (ECOSOC).

The community promotes interreligious dialogue, nonviolence, environmental awareness, and respect for cultural and religious diversity. Its activities include weekly satsang gatherings, the celebration of major Hindu festivals, public lectures, concerts of Indian classical music, exhibitions, and educational events organized in cooperation with the Embassy of India in Croatia and Croatian cultural institutions.

The International Society for Krishna Consciousness (ISKCON) is officially recognized in Croatia and has nine centres. These centres are located in Osijek, Pula, Rijeka, Split, Varaždin, Vodice, Zadar, and Zagreb, which has two. Since 2005, the community has participated in peace initiatives, including annual observances of the International Day of Peace (21 September) and the International Day of Non-Violence (2 October), commemorating the birth of Mahatma Gandhi. It has also organized tree-planting campaigns and conferences promoting peace and intercultural understanding. In 2020, the community began a project to establish a Hindu cultural and religious centre, including a Hindu temple (mandir), on a site of more than 12 hectares in Croatia.

== No religion ==
According to 2021 Croatian census, approximately 8.11% of Croatians declared themselves to be not religiously affiliated, and 83.3% of the population identified as Catholic, a decline from 86.3% in the 2011 census. The proportion of Orthodox Christians decreased from 4.4% to 3.6%, while Muslims declined from 1.5% to 1.3%. These changes reflected both an overall decline in religious affiliation and demographic changes within Croatia's Serbian and Bosniak populations.

At the same time, the proportion of people identifying as atheists, agnostics, or skeptics increased from 4.6% in 2011 to 6.4% in 2021. Despite these shifts, Christianity remained the dominant religion in Croatia, with the Catholic Church continuing to represent by far the largest religious community.

Evidence suggests irreligion is the fastest growing religious status in Croatia. The number of agnostics and skeptics rose by more than 20 times in the last ten years, while the number of atheists almost doubled. The increase in agnosticism is also attributed to public figures declaring themselves agnostic, such as President Ivo Josipović. Several irreligious organizations were founded in the 2000s, such as Protagora, David, Glas razuma - Pokret za sekularnu Hrvatsku, Nisam vjernik. They organized public actions such as the "Conference of reason" and campaign "Without a god, without a master".

== Interaction between religious and secular life ==
Orthodox Cathedral of the Transfiguration of the Lord, Zagreb

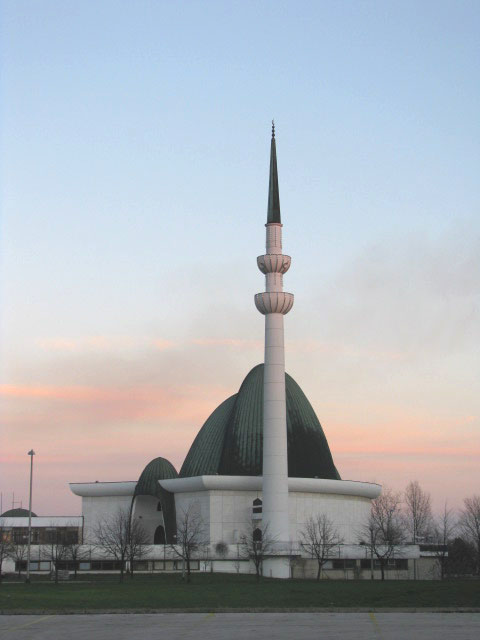
Central Mosque, Zagreb

Public schools allow religious teaching in cooperation with religious communities having agreements with the state, but attendance is not mandated. Religion classes (Croatian: vjeronauk) are organized widely in public elementary and secondary schools, most commonly coordinated with the Catholic Church.

The public holidays in Croatia also include the religious festivals (Croatian: blagdan) of Epiphany, Easter Monday, Corpus Christi Day, Assumption Day, All Saints' Day, Christmas, and St. Stephen's or Boxing Day. The primary holidays are based on the Catholic liturgical year, but other believers are legally allowed to celebrate other major religious holidays.

Marriages conducted by the religious communities having agreements with the state are officially recognized, eliminating the need to register the marriages in the civil registry office. The Catholic Church in Croatia receives state financial support and other benefits established in concordats between the Government and the Vatican. The concordats and other government agreements with non-Catholic religious communities allow state financing for some salaries and pensions for religious officials through government-managed pension and health funds.

The concordats and agreements also regulate public school catechisms and military chaplains.

In line with the concordats signed with the Roman Catholic Church and in an effort to further define their rights and privileges within a legal framework, the government has additional agreements with the following 14 religious and Faith communities:

- Old Catholic Church of Croatia
- Serbian Orthodox Church in Croatia
- Baptist Union of Croatia
- Evangelical Church in the Republic of Croatia
- Reformed Christian Calvinist Church in Croatia
- Protestant Reformed Christian Church in Croatia
- The Church of Jesus Christ of Latter-day Saints in Croatia
- Pentecostal Church
  - Union of Pentecostal Churches of Christ
- Seventh-day Adventist Church
- Church of God
- Church of Christ
- Reformed Movement of Seventh-day Adventists
- Bulgarian Orthodox Church
- Macedonian Orthodox Church
- Islam in Croatia

== Legal status ==
The 2002 Law on the Legal Position of Religious Communities broadly defines religious and Faith communities' legal positions and covers such matters as government funding, tax benefits, and religious education in schools. Matters such as pensions for clergy; religious service in the military, penitentiaries, and police; and recognition of religious and Faith marriages are left to each religious and Faith community to negotiate separately with the Government.

Registration of religious groups is not obligatory; however, registered groups are granted "legal person" status and enjoy tax and other benefits. The law stipulates that to be eligible for registration, a religious group must have at least 500 believers and be registered as an association for 5 years. All religious and Faith groups in the country prior to passage of the law in 2002 were registered without having to meet these conditions; religious and Faith groups new to the country after passage of the law must fulfill the requirements for the minimum number of believers and time as an association. Religious and Faith groups based abroad must submit written permission for registration from their country of origin. Minister of Public Administration runs a Registry of religious organizations in Republic of Croatia, currently recognizing 62 religious communities (as of 2013).

== See also ==
- Catholic Church in Croatia
- Eastern Orthodoxy in Croatia
- Protestantism in Croatia
- Church of Jesus Christ of Latter-day Saints in Croatia
- Islam in Croatia
- History of the Jews in Croatia
- Buddhism in Croatia
- Hinduism in Croatia
- Irreligion in Croatia
- Freedom of religion in Croatia
