= Irreligion in Croatia =

Irreligious Croatians
- "Without god, without a master", slogan of atheistic campaign from 2009

Total population
- Population in Croatia: 3,871,833; Not religious or spiritual: 247,510 (2021)

Regions with significant populations
- Istria County, Primorje-Gorski Kotar County, Zagreb, Split-Dalmatia County

Irreligion in Croatia pertains to atheism, agnosticism, and lack of religious affiliation in Croatia. Even though the 2011 census showed that only 4.57% of Croats considered themselves irreligious, Gallup polls conducted in 2007 and 2008 found that 30.5% of respondents did not consider religion important in their lives. The Japanese research center, Dentsu, conducted a survey in 2006 concluding that 13.2% of Croats declare themselves irreligious, compared to the 7% found by a 2010 Eurobarometer survey across Europe.

Evidence suggests irreligion is the fastest growing religious status in Croatia. The number of agnostics and skeptics rose by more than 20 times in the last ten years, while the number of atheists almost doubled. The increase in agnosticism is also attributed to public figures declaring themselves agnostic, such as President Ivo Josipović. Several irreligious organizations were founded in the 2000s, such as Protagora, David, Glas razuma - Pokret za sekularnu Hrvatsku, Nisam vjernik. They organized public actions such as the "Conference of reason" and campaign "Without a god, without a master".

== History ==
In the 19th century, irreligion in Croatia was associated with anti-clericalism in politics and modernist literature. Croatian nationalists, such as Ante Starčević, Eugen Kumičić, Stjepan Radić, and, Antun Radić advanced these anti-clerical ideas and were major proponents of secularism among the Croatian people. Despite many of them being Catholics themselves, they believed in liberal religious freedoms and feared that ties with the Catholic Church hampered the nation's desires of independence from Austria-Hungary. Writers such as Antun Gustav Matoš advocated similar beliefs.

Translations of Charles Darwin's writings first became available in Croatia in 1869, prompting a shift in the debate on irreligion to focus on Darwinism. Irreligion was seen as closely aligned with the concept, and Darwinism was seen as a major aspect of irreligion in Croatia. The role of Darwinism in Croatian irreligion, particularly in regards to education, persists into the 21st century.

Following World War II, Croatia became the Socialist Republic of Croatia as part of socialist Yugoslavia. Following the Communist takeover, state atheism was imposed. The Constitution of Yugoslavia nominally guaranteed religious freedom, but religious groups were repressed and irreligion was enforced. Following a period of liberalization toward religion in the 1960s, debate over religion took place in the context of Communism, where irreligion was advocated by supporters of Communism and religion was advocated by critics of Communism.

Irreligion in Croatia grew during the period of Communist rule, and it fell rapidly following Croatian independence from Yugoslavia. In 1953, 12.5% of Croats identified as irreligious. This number rose to 18% shortly before Croatian independence in 1989, and it fell to 4% in the 1991 census. Following the reintroduction of Catholicism into mainstream discourse in Croatia, an increase of discrimination against the irreligious has been observed, particularly in schools and government activity.

Although a connection between religion and political preferences has not been rigorously studied, irreligion is prevalent in recent Croatian politics. Five out of six recent Croatian presidential elections resulted in presidents who declared themselves irreligious. Ivica Račan, 7th Prime Minister, Zoran Milanović, 10th Prime Minister and 5th President of Croatia, Many public figures are self-declared atheists: Vesna Pusić, former First Deputy Prime Minister and Minister of Foreign and European Affairs, Milanka Opačić, former Deputy Prime Minister and Minister of Social Policy and Youth, Šime Lučin, former Interior Minister, MP Marija Lugarić. Some prominent leaders of New Atheist activist organizations, namely Neven Barković from Nisam vjernik, publicly expressed support for US-led intervention against Syrian president Bashar al-Assad in 2013.

== Demography ==
According to the 2021 census, there are 64,961 agnostics, 182,188 atheists, and slightly less than 20,000 refused to answer. The only counties where the number of irreligious people exceeded 30,000 were Istria, Primorje-Gorski Kotar and Split-Dalmatia . The highest number of irreligious people live in Istria (15.83%) and Primorje-Gorski Kotar (13.74%) counties and the City of Zagreb (13.82%).

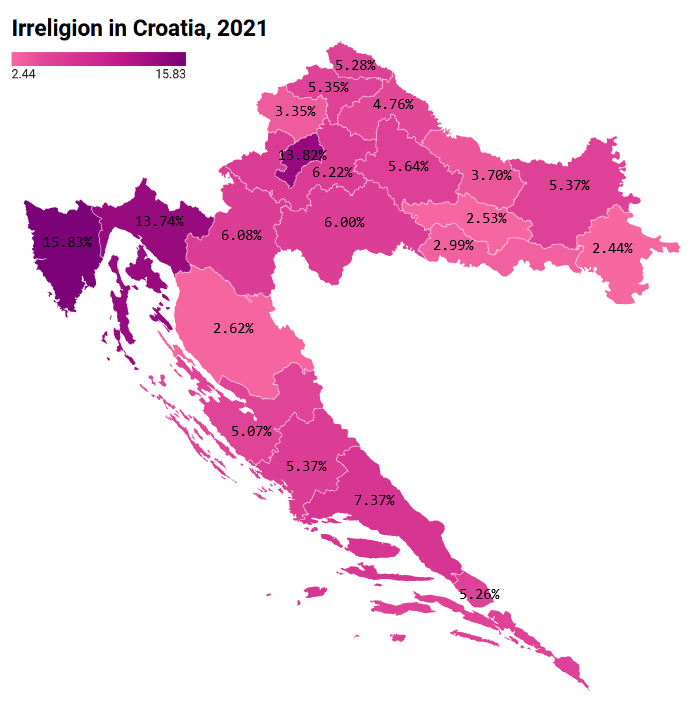
Irreligious people in Croatia, 2021

Locally, the largest share of irreligious people in Croatia is in Medulin municipality (23.52%), and from the cities, in Pula (23.01%). Towns of Rovinj and Vis are the only towns which has more than 20% of the irreligious people in addition to three Zagreb neighborhoods - Donji grad, Gornji Grad–Medveščak and Trnje. In the first 20 Croatian municipalities and cities with the highest proportions of irreligious population are mostly Istrian cities and municipalities of Istria county and Primorje-Gorski Kotar county. Considering each county individually, it can be seen that the largest share of irreligious population generally lives in towns in several counties, often county seats.

On the other hand, municipalities of Lokvičići and Dekanovec had no irreligious residents in 2021. In 20 local administrative units with the lowest percentage of irreligious population (less than 0.36%), are mostly municipalities in southwestern and eastern Croatian counties.

=== Table ===
Based on official data from the 2001, 2011 and 2021 censuses, following data on the distribution of religious and irreligious population in Croatia can be ascertained.

	2001 census				2011 census						2021 census					
County	Religious		Irreligious		Religious			Irreligious			Religious			Irreligious		
	Number	%	Number	%	Number	%	% change	Number	%	% change	Number	%	% change	Number	%	% change
Zagreb	299,123	96.59	10,573	3.41	302,871	95.36	1.25 ▲	14,735	4.64	39.36 ▲	276,266	92.10	8.78 ▼	18,637	6.22	26.48 ▲
Krapina-Zagorje	139,449	97.91	2,983	2.09	129,297	97.29	7.28 ▼	3,595	2.71	20.52 ▲	114,707	95.03	11.28 ▼	4,046	3.35	12.55 ▲
Sisak-Moslavina	174,856	94.32	10,531	5.68	162,831	94.43	6.88 ▼	9,608	5.57	8.76 ▼	128,736	92.20	20.94 ▼	8,381	6.00	12.77 ▼
Karlovac	134,223	94.67	7,564	5.33	121,914	94.58	9.17 ▼	6,985	5.42	7.65 ▼	103,808	92.52	14.85 ▼	6,822	6.08	2.33 ▼
Varaždin	179,444	97.12	5,325	2.88	167,591	95.25	6.61 ▼	8,360	4.75	57.00 ▲	147,227	92.31	12.15 ▼	8,530	5.35	2.03 ▲
Koprivnica-Križevci	120,728	97.00	3,739	3.00	111,157	96.17	7.93 ▼	4,427	3.83	18.40 ▲	95,065	93.91	14.48 ▼	4,817	4.76	8.81 ▲
Bjelovar-Bilogora	126,219	94.84	6,865	5.16	113,595	94.85	10.00 ▼	6,169	5.15	10.14 ▼	94,982	93.23	16.39 ▼	5,747	5.64	6.84 ▼
Primorje-Gorski Kotar	273,410	89.49	32,095	10.51	260,326	87.89	4.79 ▼	35,869	12.11	11.76 ▲	220,425	83.05	15.33 ▼	36,463	13.74	1.66 ▲
Lika-Senj	52,136	97.13	1,541	2.87	49,503	97.20	5.05 ▼	1,424	2.80	7.59 ▼	41,214	96.42	16.74 ▼	1,121	2.62	21.28 ▼
Virovitica-Podravina	89,748	96.10	3,641	3.90	81,683	96.28	8.99 ▼	3,153	3.72	13.40 ▼	67,062	95.31	17.90 ▼	2,599	3.70	17.57 ▼
Požega-Slavonia	82,959	96.65	2,872	3.35	75,678	96.98	8.78 ▼	2,356	3.02	17.97 ▼	60,560	94.51	19.98 ▼	1,626	2.53	30.98 ▼
Brod-Posavina	171,494	97.02	5,271	2.98	153,910	97.06	10.25 ▼	4,665	2.94	11.50 ▼	124,922	95.90	18.83 ▼	3,889	2.99	16.63 ▼
Zadar	155,010	95.66	7,035	4.34	162,045	95.31	4.54 ▲	7,972	4.69	13.32 ▲	149,823	93.77	7.54 ▼	8,099	5.07	1.59 ▲
Osijek-Baranja	316,599	95.79	13,907	4.21	291,534	95.57	7.92 ▼	13,498	4.43	2.94 ▼	240,982	93.39	17.34 ▼	13,851	5.37	2.62 ▲
Šibenik-Knin	108,088	95.75	4,803	4.25	103,789	94.89	3.98 ▼	5,586	5.11	16.30 ▲	88,924	92.26	14.32 ▼	5,851	6.07	4.74 ▲
Vukovar-Srijem	199,023	97.19	5,745	2.81	175,091	97.53	12.02 ▼	4,430	2.47	22.89 ▼	138,305	96.64	21.01 ▼	3,496	2.44	21.08 ▼
Split-Dalmatia	434,740	93.76	28,936	6.24	422,328	92.86	2.86 ▼	32,470	7.14	12.21 ▲	384,429	90.80	8.97 ▼	31,241	7.37	3.79 ▼
Istria	176,886	85.72	29,458	14.28	175,014	84.12	1.06 ▼	33,041	15.88	12.16 ▲	153,409	78.59	12.34 ▼	30,896	15.83	6.49 ▼
Dubrovnik-Neretva	116,886	95.13	5,984	4.87	116,148	94.76	0.63 ▼	6,420	5.24	7.29 ▲	106,964	92.56	7.91 ▼	6,075	5.26	5.37 ▼
Međimurje	113,685	96.00	4,741	4.00	108,549	95.38	4.52 ▼	5,255	4.62	10.84 ▲	96,006	91.22	11.56 ▼	5,562	5.28	5.84 ▲
City of Zagreb	715,972	91.89	63,173	8.11	698,664	88.44	2.42 ▼	91,353	11.56	44.61 ▲	641,242	83.60	8.22 ▼	105,981	13.82	16.01 ▲
Croatia	4,180,678	94.21	256,782	5.79	3,983,518	92.97	4.72 ▼	301,371	7.03	17.36 ▲	3,475,058	89.76	12.76 ▼	313,730	8.11	4.10 ▲

== Research ==
A general scarcity of scientific research on irreligion in Croatia means that there is no way to know what proportions of subgroups such as voters, workers in specific industries, etc. are irreligious.

International longitudinal research Aufbruch conducted in 1997 in ten countries of Central and Eastern Europe revealed that in Croatia, 31.5% of respondents considered themselves very religious, 42.6% somewhat religious, while the remaining 26% said either that they are not religious, or that they are somewhat or completely irreligious. On the question which examined the image of God, 25.6% of respondents said they sometimes do not believe in God or do not believe in him at all.

Research of the irreligious' attitudes toward religion and faith, revealed that all respondents differentiate religion and faith, and some church and religion. Among the critics of religion, respondents usually cited control and deceive of the masses, financial interest action, fundamentalism arising from religion, aggressive intrusion into the social sphere, the separation of people and imposing one value system as the only correct one, while those who expressed a positive attitude emphasized that religion plays an important role in society and history.

== See also ==
- Demographics of Croatia
- Freedom of religion in Croatia
- Religion in Croatia
