= The Church of Jesus Christ of Latter-day Saints in Croatia =

Latter Day Saints Church

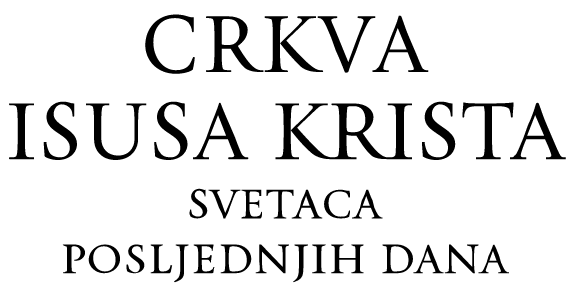
- (Logo in Croatian)
- Area: Europe Central
- Members: 739 (2025)
- Districts: 1
- Branches: 5
- Missions: 1
- FamilySearch Centers: 4

The Church of Jesus Christ of Latter-day Saints in Croatia refers to the Church of Jesus Christ of Latter-day Saints (LDS Church) and its members in Croatia. The first missionaries arrived in Croatia in 1974. In 2025, there were 739 members in 5 congregations.

== History ==
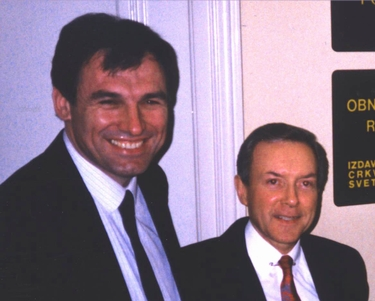
Sen. Orrin Hatch visits with Krešimir Ćosić in Zagreb, Yugoslavia. April 12, 1990.

Membership in Croatia
Year	Membership
1989*	100
1999	299
2009	513
2019	635
2025	739
*Membership was published as a rounded number. Source: Wendall J. Ashton; Jim M. Wall, Deseret News, various years, Church Almanac Country Information: Croatia

Krešimir Ćosić was baptized in 1971 while studying and playing for Brigham Young University. He rejected his 1973 draft with the Los Angeles Lakers and returned to Yugoslavia to play and coach basketball in 1974. He won many of Basketball's highest recognitions during his college and professional career. Throughout his career, Ćosić would openly talk about the LDS Church. He served in local church leadership roles while in Croatia.

The first sacrament meeting was held in Zadar on September 11, 1972. The Zadar Branch, Croatia's first, was organized in 1974. A limited number of North American missionaries served in Yugoslavia on limited assignments in the late 1970s. In 1981, the first full-time missionary called from Yugoslavia, Radmila Ranović, started her mission. She was called to serve in the Canada Montréal Mission. In 1982, the Zagreb Branch was organized. President Thomas S. Monson dedicated Croatia for missionary work on October 31, 1985, in Zagreb. Through much of the 1980s, missionaries were only permitted to speak about the Church if they were first asked by a potential investigator. In April 1987, Russell M. Nelson and other church leaders met with government authorities and received verbal permission for missionaries to openly proselytize in Croatia. The LDS Church received official government recognition in September 1987. Seminary began in 1997. On May 25, 2008, a major public square in Zagreb was named after Krešimir Ćosić. Institute began in 2008.

On May 24, 2009, Elder D. Todd Christofferson of the Quorum of the Twelve Apostles dedicated the newly constructed Zagreb meetinghouse. This was the first Church-constructed meetinghouse in Croatia. In May 2012, Young Women in Croatia attended young women camp for the first time. More than 375 people attended a commemoration celebrating 40 years since the beginning of Ćosić's efforts to establish the LDS Church in Yugoslavia on June 1–2, 2012.

=== Humanitarian Efforts ===
The Church has conducted 161 humanitarian projects since 1985 that have included activities such as clean water initiatives, community projects, emergency response, refugee response, and wheelchair donations. Most recent projects have focused on refugees. Large amounts of humanitarian aid were donated from 1991 to 1992 due to war in the region. Between 1993 and 1998, the LDS Church provided thousands of tons of food, clothing, bedding and medical supplies to Croatia. In 1997, missionaries Vernon and Muriel Smith launched a project to help struggling farmers in the Sisak region reestablish the local pork industry. In 1999, the Church donated 130 pigs to needy refugee families to replenish their lost livestock. In 2002, Church members in the Netherlands donated quilts and toys to orphanages in Croatia and Slovakia. In 2003, the Church began planting 1,450 fruit trees at an elementary school in Ratkovac to help increase self-sufficiency.

=== Genealogical research ===
As a branch of the world's largest genealogy library which is open to the public, there are four Family History Centers in Croatia in addition to their online website. The Family Center in Zagreb, Croatia became operational in 2008 with three others afterwards. This includes accessible data from registers of births, marriages and deaths from parishes, register offices and state and church archives in Croatia.

== District and Congregations ==
LDS Church Locations as of August 2026
The mission office and mission home is located in Zagreb
Orange = District Center and meetinghouse
Purple = meetinghouse
(FHC) = Family History Center

On December 10, 2023, all congregations within the Adriatic North Mission became included in a single district called the Adriatic North District. As of August 2026 there were 10 congregations

Namely,

Bosnia and Herzegovina

- Sarajevo Branch

Croatia

- Osijek Branch
- Rijeka Branch
- Split Branch
- Zadar Branch
- Zagreb Branch

Montenegro

- Podgorica Branch

Serbia

- Beograd Branch

Slovenia

- Ljubljana Branch
- Maribor Branch

Congregations not part of a stake are called branches, regardless of size.

== Missions ==
Prior to 1987, any missionary activity was performed under the Austria Vienna Mission. The Austria Vienna East Mission was organized on July 1, 1987, and administered to Yugoslavia. On July 1, 1996, the Austria Vienna South Mission was created and administered to the former Yugoslavia. Mission headquarters were relocated to Slovenia in 1999 and renamed the Slovenia Ljubljana Mission. On January 9, 2003, the mission home and office was relocated to Croatia and became the Croatia Zagreb Mission. In the early 2010s, the Adriatic North Mission headquarters was relocated to Zagreb, Croatia. As of December 2023, the Mission covers missionary efforts in Bosnia and Herzegovina, Croatia, Montenegro, Serbia, and Slovenia.

=== Bosnia and Herzegovina ===
The LDS Church reported 91 members in Bosnia and Herzegovina for year-end 2025. The only branch is located in Sarajevo.

=== Montenegro ===
The LDS Church reported 65 members in Montenegro in a single congregation for year-end 2025. The Podgorica Branch is the only congregation meeting in Montenegro. A family history center is also located in the Podgorica meetinghouse.

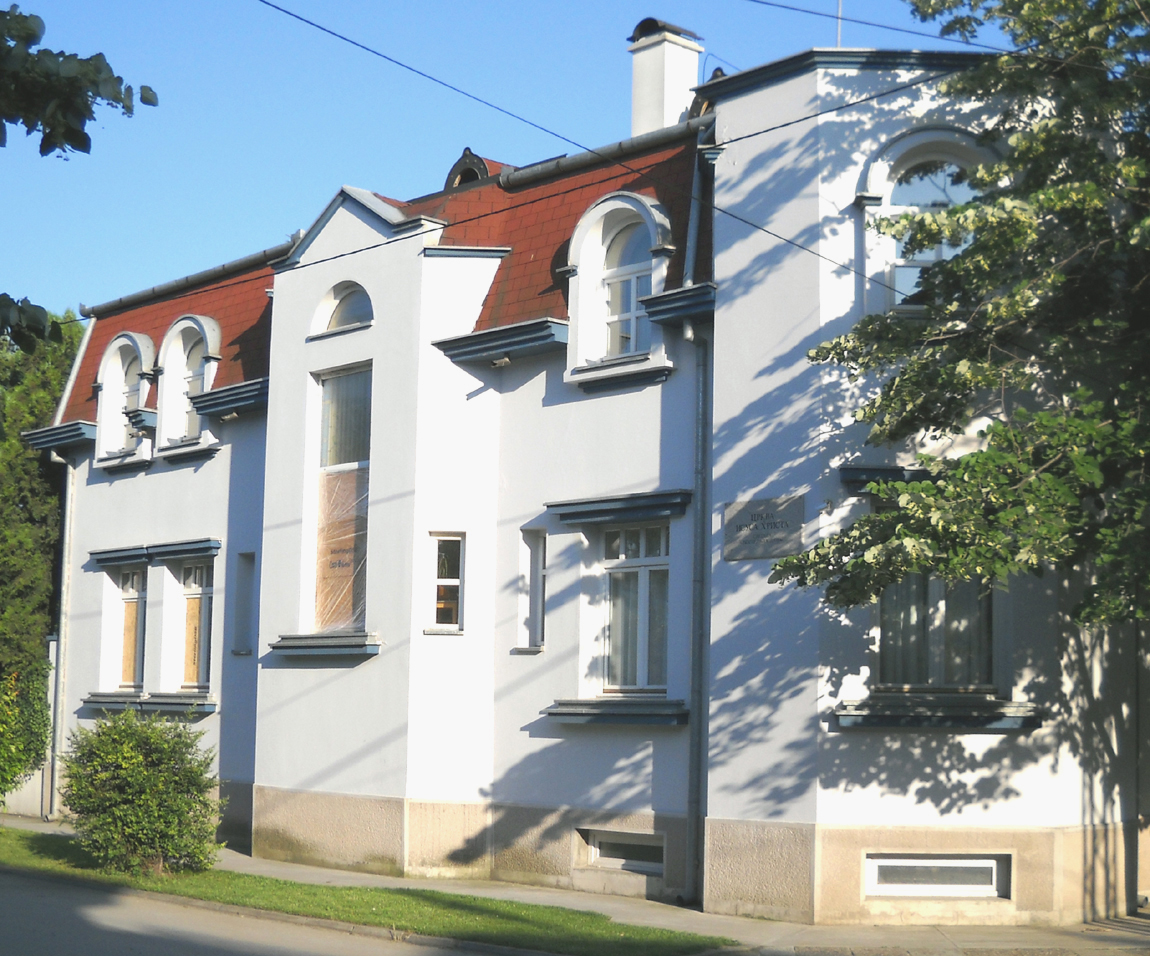
A meetinghouse of the LDS Church in Novi Sad, Serbia

=== Serbia ===
The LDS Church reported 422 members in a single congregations as well as a family search center in Serbia for year-end 2025. These congregations are namely the Beograd Branch, Novi Sad Branch and Sremska Mitrovica Branch. Family history centers are located in Beograd and Novi Sad.

=== Slovenia ===
The LDS Church reported 466 members in 2 congregations in Slovenia for year-end 2025. These congregations are the Ljubljana Branch and Maribor Branch. A family history center is located in Ljubljana.

== Temples ==
There are no temples in the Adriatic North Mission. As of May 2022, countries within the Adriatic North Mission were assigned to the Frankfurt Germany Temple. Church President Russell M. Nelson has announced that a temple will be built in Vienna, Austria and Budapest, Hungary which, once completed, will reduce the travel time and cost needed to attend a temple.

== See also ==
- Religion in Croatia
