= Rijeka Mosque =

Mosque in Rijeka, Croatia

- Džamija u Rijeci
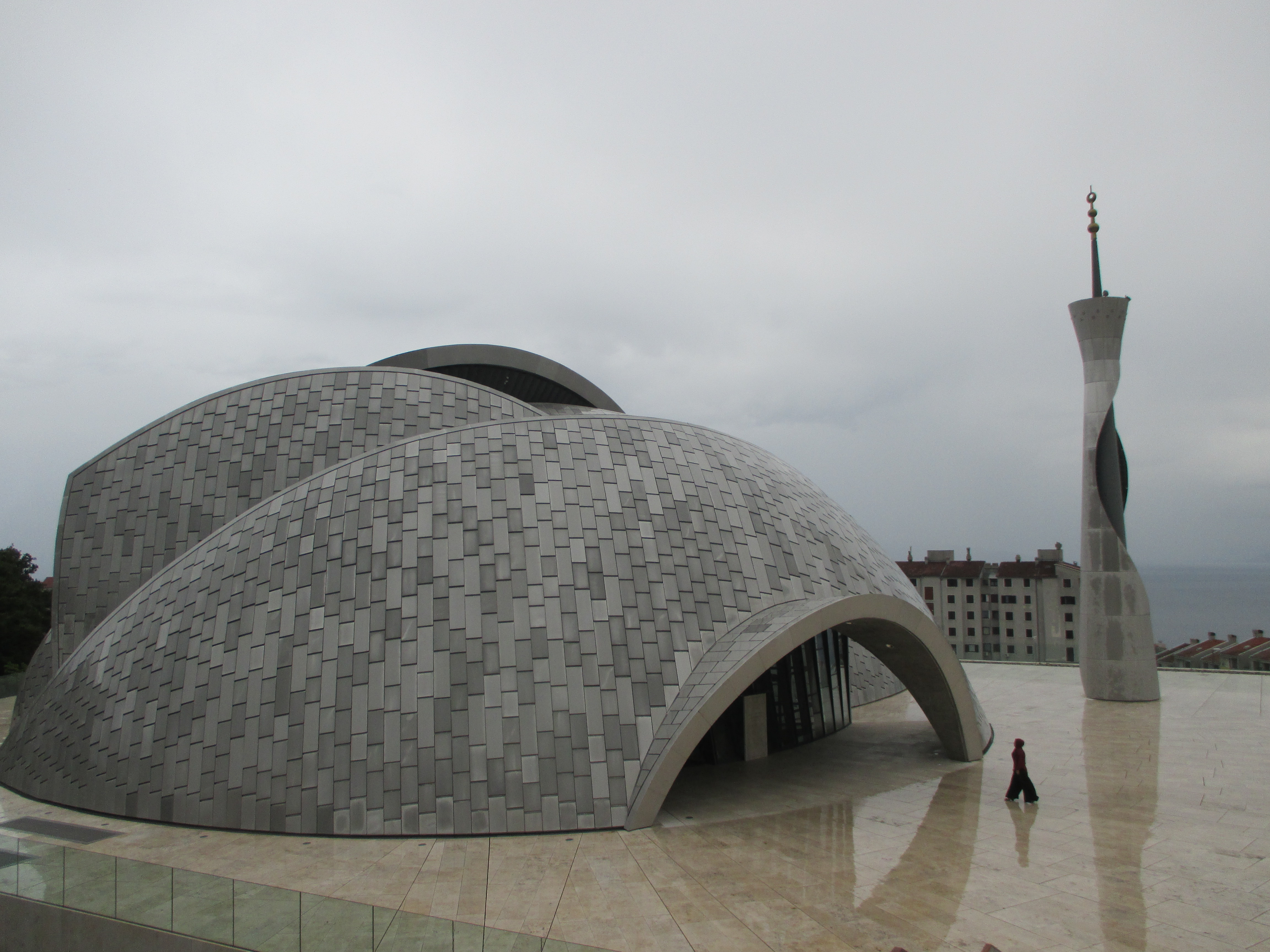

- Location of the mosque in Croatia

Religion
- Affiliation: Islam
- Ecclesiastical or organizational status: Mosque
- Status: Active

Location
- Location: Rijeka, Primorje-Gorski Kotar
- Country: Croatia
- Interactive map of Rijeka Mosque
- Coordinates: 45°20′45″N 14°23′51″E

Architecture
- Architects: Dušan Džamonja; Branko Vučinović; Darko Vlahović
- Type: Mosque
- Style: Islamic architecture
- Creator: Dušan Džamonja
- Groundbreaking: 2009
- Completed: 2013
- Construction cost: HRK 76 million

Specifications
- Capacity: 1,400 worshipers
- Interior area: 3,612 m^{2} (38,880 sq ft)
- Dome: 1 (in 5 parts)
- Minaret: 1
- Minaret height: 23 m (75 ft)
- Site area: 5,291 m^{2} (56,950 sq ft)

The Rijeka Mosque (Croatian: Džamija u Rijeci; Bosnian: Džamija u Rijeci) is a mosque, located in Rijeka, Croatia. The mosque was built between 2009 and 2013.

== Overview ==
The mosque is a part of the Islamic Cultural Center which was built on a 10,816-square-metre (116,420 sq ft) plot and which itself covers 5,291 square metres (56,950 sq ft), or 3,612 square metres (38,880 sq ft) of closed space.

The mosque's dome is shaped in five separate parts that visually constitute a single object. The project was originally designed by a sculptor rather than an architect; Dušan Džamonja initially sculpted a miniature model of the mosque, before collaborating with architects Branko Vučinović and Darko Vlahović to bring his model to life.

The entire project cost HRK 76 million, with significant contribution by the state of Qatar. In 2013, Croatian media described the building as one of the most beautiful mosques in Europe.

== See also ==
- Islam in Croatia
