= Freedom of religion in Croatia =

The Constitution provides for freedom of religion.

In 2023, the country was scored 3 out of 4 for religious freedom; this was mainly due to harassment of the Serb Orthodox community and Holocaust denial.

== Religious demography ==
The government carried out a census in 2021 which showed that 79% of the population is Catholic, 5% is atheist or agnostic, 3.3% is Serbian Orthodox and 1.3% is Muslim; Jews, Protestants and other Christians made up the remainder.

This article is informed by the US State Dept 2007 report. Later reports are available.[1]

The statistics regarding religious affiliation correlate closely with the country's ethnic makeup. The Serbian Orthodox, predominantly ethnic Serbs associated with the SPC, live primarily in cities and areas bordering on Bosnia and Herzegovina and Serbia. Most members of other minority religious groups reside in urban areas.

== Status of religious freedom ==
=== Legal and policy framework ===
The Constitution provides for freedom of religion and free public profession of religious conviction, and the Government generally respected these rights in practice.

There is no official state religion; however, the Roman Catholic Church receives financial state support and other benefits established in concordats between the Government and the Vatican. The concordats and other government agreements with non-Catholic religious communities allow state financing for some salaries and pensions for religious officials through government-managed pension and health funds. Marriages conducted by the religious communities having agreements with the state are officially recognized, eliminating the need to register the marriages in the civil registry office. The concordats also regulate public school catechisms and military chaplains.

In line with the concordats signed with the Roman Catholic Church and in an effort to further define their rights and privileges within a legal framework, the Government signed additional agreements with the following 14 religious communities: the SPC and the Islamic Community of Croatia in 2002; and the Evangelical Church, Reformed Christian Church, Pentecostal Church, Union of Pentecostal Churches of Christ, Christian Adventist Church, Union of Baptist Churches, Church of God, Church of Christ, Reformed Movement of Seventh-day Adventists, Bulgarian Orthodox Church, Macedonian Orthodox Church, and Croatian Old Catholic Church in 2003.

Both the Jewish Community of Zagreb (ZOZ) and the more recently formed Bet Israel congregation sought a similar agreement with the state, and negotiations were under way between the Government and the two Jewish communities. The ZOZ earlier refused an offered agreement because of lack of progress on property restitution. An ongoing legal dispute between the two communities delayed the signing of the agreement that the Government proposed in December 2006. The dispute stemmed from the June 2006 registration of the Bet Israel congregation, which left the ZOZ in 2005. The ZOZ contested the Government's decision to register Bet Israel as a religious group on grounds that it did not meet the necessary legal requirements and filed a lawsuit to have the registration annulled. Bet Israel subsequently countersued, contesting ZOZ's qualifications as a religious organization. At the end of the period covered by this report, both suits were pending in the Zagreb Municipal Court.

The December 2005 case in which three religious groups—the Church of the Full Gospel, Alliance of Churches "Word of Life," and Protestant Reformed Christian Church—challenged the Government's refusal to conclude agreements to provide them benefits similar to those provided by agreements with the Roman Catholic, Serbian Orthodox, Islamic, and other communities remained pending in the Constitutional Court at the end of the period covered by this report.

The law broadly defines religious communities' legal positions and covers such matters as government funding, tax benefits, and religious education in schools. Other important issues, such as pensions for clergy, religious service in the military, penitentiaries and police, and recognition of religious marriages, are left to each religious community to negotiate separately with the Government.

Registration of religious groups is not obligatory; however, registered groups are granted "legal person" status and enjoy tax and other benefits. The law stipulates that to be eligible for registration, a religious group must have at least 500 believers and be registered as an association for 5 years. All religious groups in the country prior to passage of the law in 2003 were being registered without conditions; religious groups new to the country since passage of the law must fulfill the requirements for the minimum number of believers and time as an association. At the end of the period covered by this report, 42 religious groups had been registered, and an additional 13 had applied for registration. Religious groups based abroad must submit written permission for registration from their country of origin. No specific licensing is required for foreign missionaries.

Restitution of all nationalized or confiscated property is regulated under the 1996 Law on Restitution of Property Expropriated During Yugoslav Communist Rule, as amended in 2002. As of mid-2007, only persons who obtained citizenship by October 1996 may file claims under the law. With regard to the period covered by the law, government officials stated that a 1999 constitutional court decision has the effect of allowing claims relating to confiscations during the previously excluded period of World War II to be considered under the law's provisions. Noncitizens, including those who fled the country and lost their citizenship, are not allowed to file claims under the law and related regulations. At the end of the period covered by this report, an attempt to amend the legislation had not been approved.

=== Restrictions on religious freedom ===
Government policy and practice contributed to the generally free practice of religion. The Government imposed no formal restrictions on religious groups, and all religious communities were free to conduct public services and to open and operate social and charitable institutions.

SPC officials reported that they had access to hospitals and prisons to provide pastoral care but complained that they encountered difficulties assessing the level of need for Serbian Orthodox religious care in both the military and the police structures. In April 2007 the Ministry of Defense offered the SPC a contract to appoint a Serbian Orthodox priest exclusively to the military; a response from the Ministry of Interior was pending at end of the reporting period.

Facilitating the return of refugees (primarily ethnic Serbs) remained a challenge for the Government, which nevertheless made progress in a number of areas relating to returns. However, some ethnic Serbs who wished to return to the country, including Serbian Orthodox clergy, continued to encounter difficulties or delays in resolving various administrative matters. SPC officials reported that the number of Serbian Orthodox clergy, down to 30 after the 1991-95 war, gradually rose and remained steady at approximately 130 in the period covered by this report. The increase was most pronounced in the Dalmatian and Karlovac eparchies, where return of refugees had been the most intense. SPC sources continued to complain that new priests, particularly in Knin, had to renew their temporary work permits and residency status at relatively short intervals. The lack of a more permanent status deprived them and their family members of health care benefits and pensions. The SPC raised the problem with the Government in December 2006; however, the Government continued to insist on the application of the standard procedure for issuance of work permits and residency documents and refused to give priests preferential status.

The Government requires that religious training be provided in public schools, although attendance is optional. Because 85 percent of the population is Roman Catholic, the Roman Catholic catechism is the predominant religious teaching offered in public schools. Schools that met the necessary quota of seven students of a minority faith per school allowed separate religion classes for the students. While noting progress in Knin regarding availability of religious education in the schools, SPC officials complained that requests to change the agreement and lower the minimum number of seven students per school were denied.

SPC officials continued to report that many schoolchildren and their parents, particularly in cities where Serbian Orthodox believers do not live in compact communities, remained reluctant to identify themselves as Serbian Orthodox to avoid being singled out.

Restitution of property nationalized or confiscated by the Yugoslav communist regime remained a problem. Many religious communities identified property return as their top priority and complained about the lack of progress. The SPC was generally satisfied with the fact that it held three meetings with government representatives on the joint state-church commission and subcommissions during the period covered by this report but complained that the meetings had only limited results. The SPC noted that the pace of property restitution continued to be minimal. Early in 2007 Metropolitan Jovan Pavlovic wrote to both the U.N. High Commissioner for Refugees and the Organization for Security and Cooperation in Europe to ask for an analysis and propose changes to the 1996 property restitution law. The law effectively annulled previous legislation and opened the possibility for the Government to resell previously nationalized property to new private owners, making restitution more difficult, according to the SPC.

SPC officials were particularly concerned about the lack of progress in restitution of several valuable business and residential buildings in downtown Zagreb, most notably the Zagreb Cinema building. The dispute worsened in January 2007 after a private developer, who bought the cinema in March 2006, announced plans to demolish the building and construct a new structure in its place. The SPC accused Zagreb city officials of secretly supporting the sale to the developer and undermining negotiations on its purchase. In February 2007 the SPC filed a lawsuit in the Supreme Court over excessively lengthy legal procedures, largely because its earlier lawsuit against the alleged wrongful privatization of the cinema property had been pending before the Administrative Court for 3 years. The SPC also continued with legal action initiated in 2004 against the owners of 40 previously SPC-owned (and later nationalized) apartments in Zagreb to prevent further sale of the units. The SPC also claimed land in the north of Zagreb. No progress was made in this area during the reporting period or in the return of properties that belonged to monasteries, such as arable land and forests.

Reconstruction of a number of Serbian Orthodox churches continued, and approximately 50 Serbian Orthodox churches and other religious buildings received money from the state budget for reconstruction projects. Most notably, the Ministry of Reconstruction almost fully funded the reconstruction of the landmark St. Nicholas Church in the center of Karlovac, which was demolished during the 1991-95 war. SPC officials commended this progress but pointed out that other than in Karlovac, these were mostly small investments and the funding allocated was insufficient for costlier reconstruction of some of their capital objects from the priority list presented to the Government 2 years previously.

The Roman Catholic Church had considerable success in receiving restituted property during the reporting period. During the latter half of 2006, church officials reported that an order of nuns received a property to be used as a house in Koprivnica; the Government also returned part of a monastery in Makarska, a cinema building in Rijeka, and a monastery on Badija Island. In September 2006 a Roman Catholic group received a property to be used as a home for mentally disabled children. The Government returned property on Mali Losinj to the Sisters of the Holy Cross and a building on the island of Pag to a Benedictine order. Also in the fall of 2006, the Djakovo Diocese received an abandoned hospital building in exchange for an undetermined property located elsewhere. Negotiations that began 4 years ago were temporarily stalled on the Government's offer of a 25 percent stake in the Croatia Osiguranje insurance company as compensation for unreturned property.

Several Jewish properties, including some buildings in Zagreb, were not returned during the reporting period. The Jewish community stated that the process of returning nationalized property in Zagreb, halted in 2005, had not progressed. In April 2007 the Jewish Community of Osijek reported the successful return of one commercial property. Other claims remained stalled in court.

The Islamic Community had no property claims. After several years of delays, in March 2007 a zoning plan was accepted for construction of a mosque in Rijeka. Plans existed to build a mosque in Osijek, but administrative procedures for rezoning the land delayed construction.

There were no reports of religious prisoners or detainees in the country, or of forced religious conversions. There were reports of sporadic vandalism, particularly in the war-affected areas, directed against Serbian Orthodox Church (SPC) property.

=== Anti-Semitism ===
Acts of anti-Semitism are rare in Croatia. In February 2007 a sugar company in Požega produced and locally distributed sugar packets bearing an image of Adolf Hitler and containing offensive jokes about Holocaust victims. The State Prosecutor's Office reported that the case was under investigation.

In September 2006 a brochure that analyzed primary and secondary school history textbooks was prepared and published by The Jewish Community of Zagreb organisation in cooperation with Yad Vashem and the Visual History Foundation. The authors – several prominent historians – criticized the lack of information concerning Jewish ethnic identity and culture and the genesis of anti-Semitism. Historians stated that existing textbooks implied that implementation of racist laws had no roots in the World War II-era Independent State of Croatia but occurred exclusively under the influence of the Nazi-affiliated regime.

In July 2006 a private website in Pozesko-Slavonska County published an anti-Semitic satire involving the head of the Simon Wiesenthal Center, prior to his visit to the country. The text also mocked the Požega mayor's plans to reconstruct the Jewish cemetery and the Government's requests to speed up the extradition from Austria of an Ustasha commander formerly active in Požega.

== Societal abuses and discrimination ==
Religion and ethnicity were closely linked in society, and religion often was used historically to identify non-Croats and single them out for discriminatory practices. This link contributed to the ethnic conflicts of the 1990s and to the perpetration of violence and intimidation against religious persons, institutions, and symbols of all religious groups. Such incidents occurred sporadically, and their frequency and gravity continued to decrease.

Human rights nongovernmental organizations and religious leaders noted that overall ethnic and religious relations remained stable. The exceptions were occasional incidents largely involving desecration and vandalism of SPC property, which remained most pronounced in the Dalmatian hinterland and Knin area. In February 2007 the tower of the Holy Archangel Monastery in Kistanje was severely vandalized immediately following its restitution to the SPC. At the same time, the monastery received a threatening letter containing offensive remarks against ethnic Serbs. In the same month, the fence of the Serbian Orthodox cemetery in Biljane Donje, north of Zadar, was torn down. The unidentified perpetrators lit fires and used a bulldozer to pile rubble on two grave sites prepared for future tombs. In Koprivnica in January 2007, vandals broke into the Holy Trinity Church, removed relics from the altar, and damaged a valuable prayer book. In Zadar in December 2006, unidentified persons sprayed Ustasha symbols and offensive graffiti referring to a Serbian Orthodox saint on the fence of the St. Ilija Church. SPC sources also reported that an unknown perpetrator lit a fire in front of the Serbian Orthodox diocese building. Police investigated but did not identify perpetrators in the cases.

St. George's Church, near Knin, was vandalized twice, once in October 2006 and again in December 2006. In August 2006 police investigated the theft of church bells from the St. Dimitrije the Martyr Church in Bjelovar and from another church in the village of Toranja near Pozega but identified no perpetrators. In Sibenik five teenagers barged into the Holy Assumption Church during Mass and unsuccessfully attempted to throw a flammable item inside the church.

In contrast with the previous report, the Islamic Community reported no violence or harassment toward religious persons or sites during the reporting period.

The Jasenovac Memorial Museum and Education Center opened in November 2006. Numerous government officials, including the President, Prime Minister, and Speaker of Parliament as well as academic, religious, and diplomatic leaders attended the event. Representatives from the Simon Wiesenthal Center and several individuals from the Jewish community asserted that the new exhibits did not appropriately reflect the horrors that took place in the camp or the ethnic makeup of the victims, predominantly Serbs. President Mesic and ethnic Serb Member of Parliament Milorad Pupovac indicated that the center was "a work in progress" with adjustments to be made in the future. Visiting U.S. experts from the U.S. Holocaust Memorial Museum praised the new permanent exhibition.

In March 2007 Pozega Bishop Antun Skvorcevic became the first Roman Catholic bishop to visit Jasenovac when he led a delegation of 90 priests and deacons from the area to visit the new exhibit and pay respects to the victims. Skvorcevic later announced plans to begin holding ecumenical prayers in Jasenovac with representatives of other religious communities.

In April 2007 President Mesic spoke at the annual commemoration ceremony at the Jasenovac concentration camp. Representatives of Parliament, the Government, and national minorities as well as representatives of the Serbian Orthodox, Jewish, Islamic, and Roman Catholic faiths attended the ceremony.

In May 2007 Cardinal Bozanic spoke at the annual Bleiburg, Austria, commemoration of the 1945 execution of suspected Ustasha collaborators and a number of Croatian civilians by Yugoslav communists. The move was potentially controversial because Roman Catholic Church leaders at that level had not previously attended commemorations for Ustasha victims in Jasenovac. While calling on the Government to investigate communist crimes and identify the culprits, Bozanic for the first time publicly condemned Jasenovac as "the place of Ustasha crimes" and "the horrible execution ground and a place of inhumanity." One leading daily newspaper commended Bozanic for acting responsibly and having "directly demonstrated that all mass crimes are equally atrocious and cannot be justified." Croatian Helsinki Committee member Žarko Puhovski also welcomed Bozanic's words but added that balance would be achieved only if the cardinal attended the next commemoration for Holocaust victims in Jasenovac.

Zadar Archbishop Ivan Prendja supported reconciliation between ethnic Croats and Serbs in the Zadar area. In an August 2006 sermon at the inauguration of a reconstructed Franciscan monastery in the village of Karin, Prendja expressed hope that the monastery would become a place of coexistence between Roman Catholic and Serbian Orthodox believers.

== See also ==
- Religion in Croatia
- Human rights in Croatia
- Holy See-Yugoslavia relations
