= Rijeka Orthodox Synagogue =

Orthodox synagogue in Rijeka, Croatia

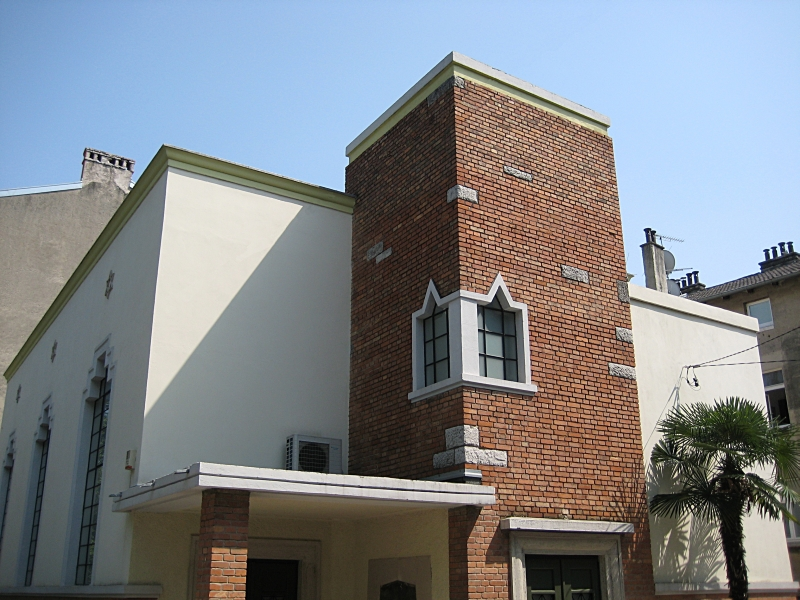
- The synagogue in 2008

- Location of the synagogue in Croatia

Religion
- Affiliation: Orthodox Judaism
- Ecclesiastical or organizational status: Synagogue
- Status: Active

Location
- Location: 9 Ivana Filipovića Street, Rijeka
- Country: Croatia
- Interactive map of Rijeka Orthodox Synagogue
- Coordinates: 45°19′52″N 14°26′03″E

Architecture
- Architects: Győzo Angyal; Pietro Fabbro
- Type: Synagogue architecture
- Style: Rationalism
- Completed: 1931
- Materials: Red brick; marble

Cultural Good of Croatia
- Official name: Synagogue (Croatian: Sinagoga)
- Type: Immovable material heritage
- Designated: March 27, 2008
- Reference no.: Z-341

The Rijeka Orthodox Synagogue is an Orthodox Jewish synagogue, located on Ivan Filipović Street, formerly Galvani Street (opposite the Faculty of Economics), in Rijeka in Croatia. The synagogue was built in a Rationalist style in 1931 (when Rijeka was part of Italy). It is one of the very few synagogues in Croatian territory to have survived the destruction of the Nazi period.

== History ==
The small orthodox synagogue of Rijeka was completed in 1931 to meet the needs of the Orthodox Jews who were in the minority in Rijeka compared to the large Jewish community, which met in the majestic Great Synagogue of Rijeka (built in 1903 and destroyed by the Nazis in 1944).

The project was entrusted to the architects Győzo Angyal and Pietro Fabbro. Together with the synagogue of Genoa, it is one of only two examples of a modern-style synagogue built in Italy during the Fascist period.

The synagogue has a simple tripartite façade with a central body in red brick and stone slabs with two doors (one of which under a portico leads directly to the women's gallery) and two small windows with an ornamental reference to the Star of David. The interior has a single room with the raised balcony of the women's gallery overlooking the entrance. The Italian-style marble tabernacle containing the holy ark with the books of the Torah was a gift in 1934 from the Jews of Trieste to the Fiuman confreres (until then it adorned the Schola grande in Piazza delle Scuole israelitiche in Trieste).

The Orthodox synagogue in Rijeka is one of the very few synagogues in Croatian territory that survived the destruction of the Holocaust. The temple remained standing, because during the Nazi occupation it was used as an ammunition depot, while the large synagogue in Rijeka was destroyed on January 25, 1944. After the war, the small Orthodox synagogue was thus able to house the few surviving Rijeka Jews of that which until a few years earlier was a thriving community of over 2,000 members.

The Orthodox synagogue became nationalized property on December 5, 1956. In 1996 it was declared a monument of historical and cultural interest of the city. In 2005–2008 it underwent major restoration works. The small Rijeka community (now reduced to a hundred members) uses it today for major holidays with the assistance of the neighboring communities of Trieste and Zagreb.

== See also ==
- History of the Jews in Croatia
- List of synagogues in Croatia
- Rijeka (Croatia)

== Gallery ==
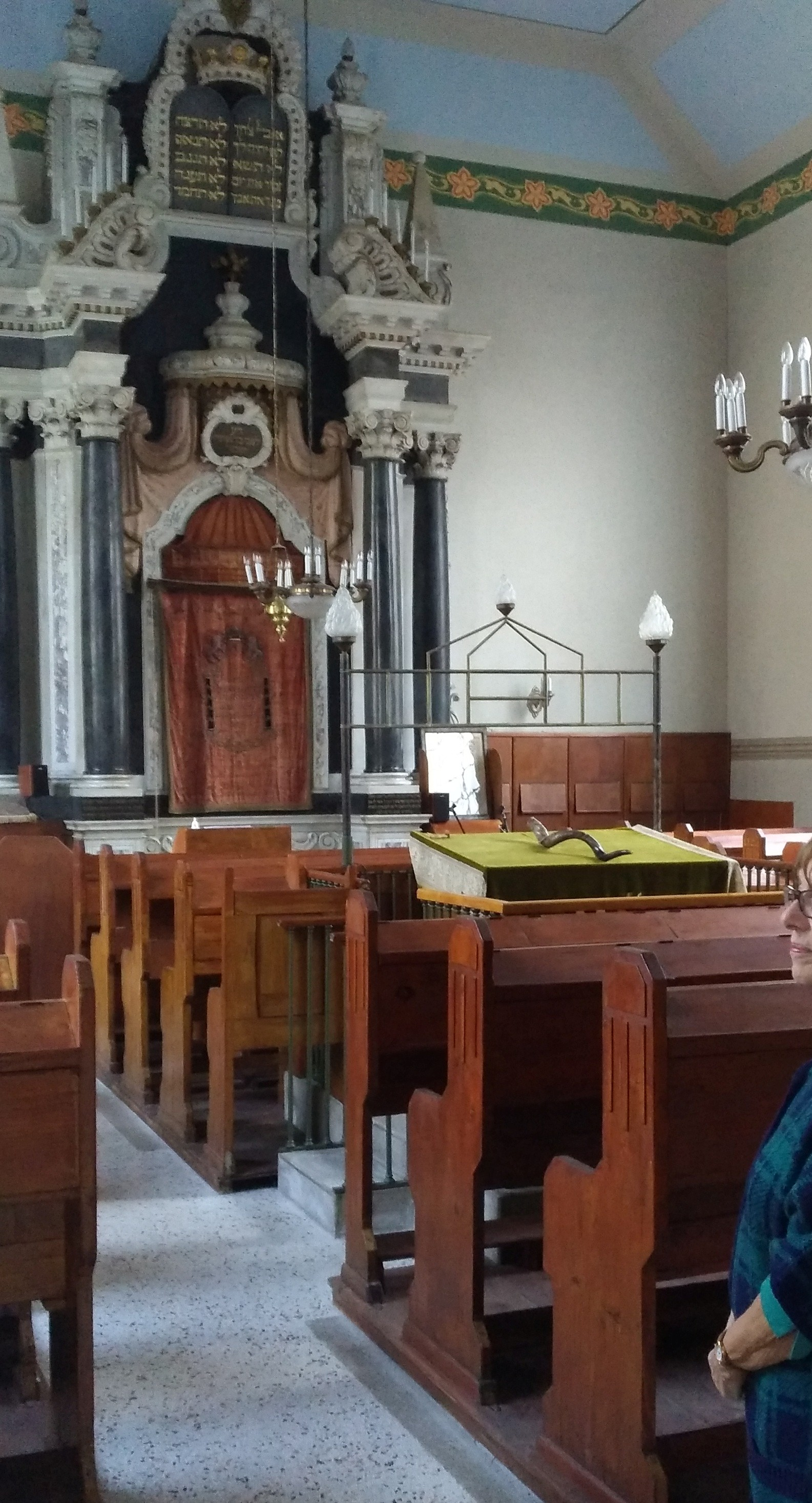
Interior of the synagogue

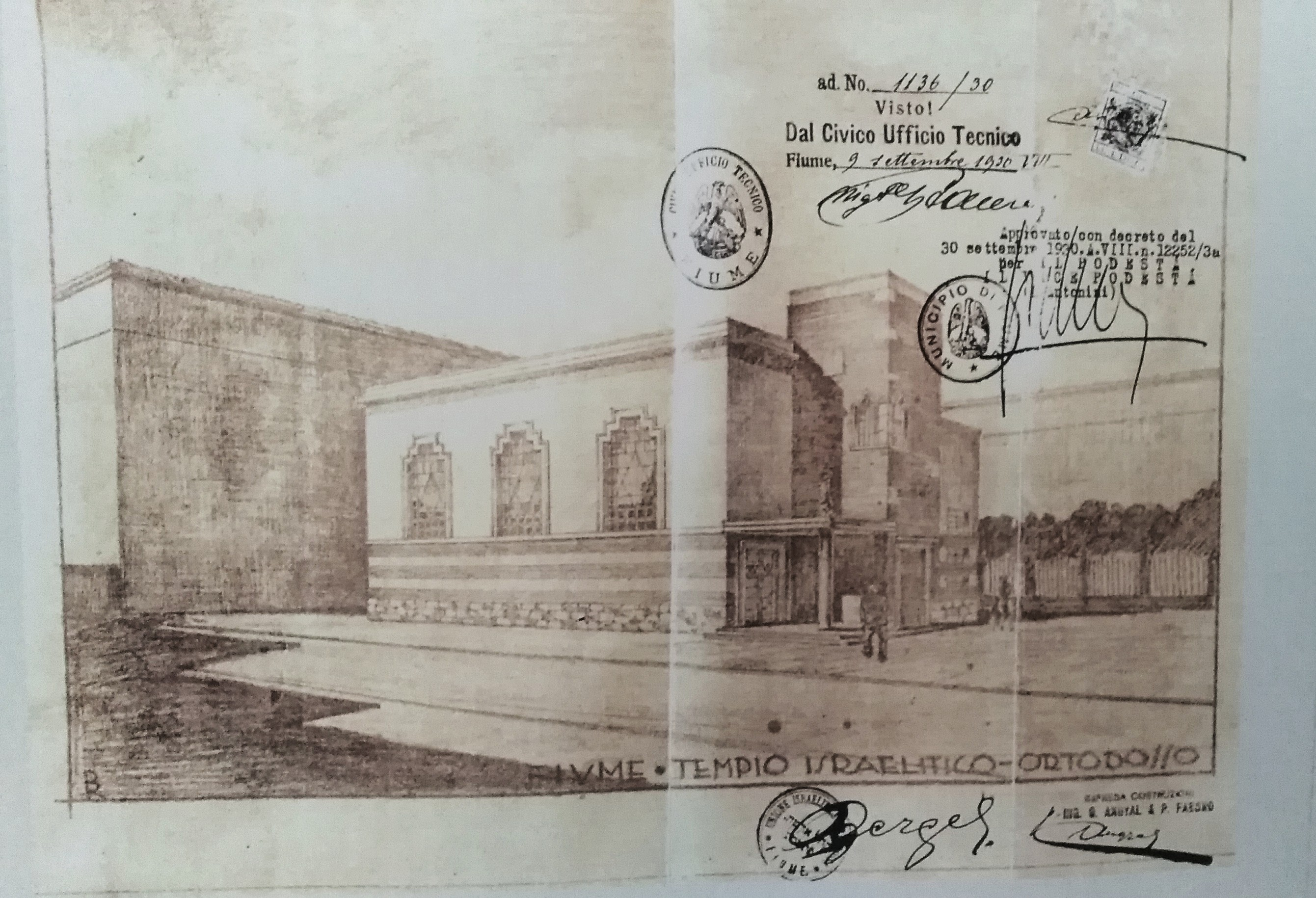
Project approval on 30 September 1930
