= Koprivnica Synagogue =

Former synagogue in Koprivnica, Croatia

- Croatian: Koprivnička sinagoga
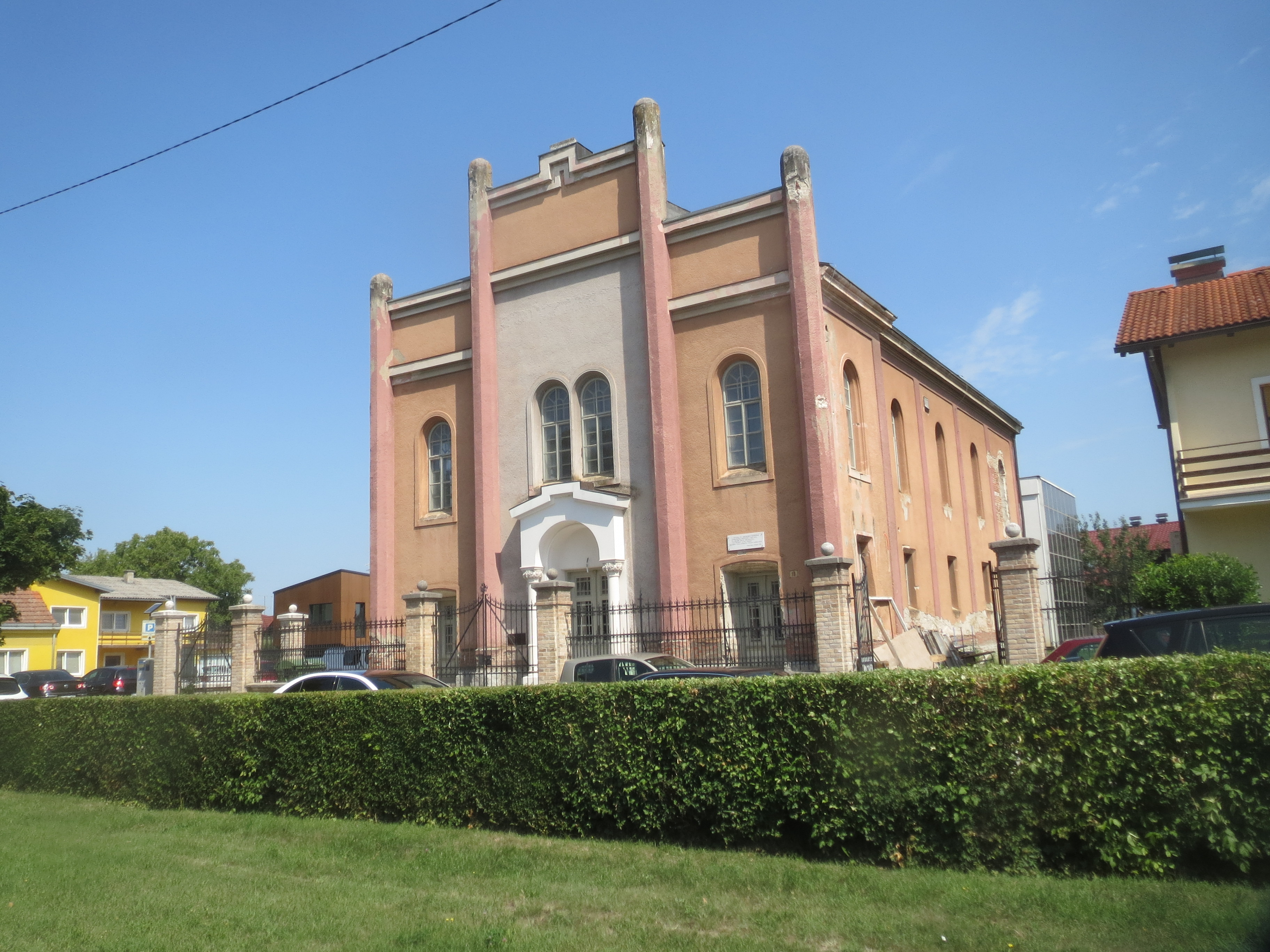
- The former synagogue in 2021

- Location of the former synagogue in Croatia

Religion
- Affiliation: Reform Judaism (former)
- Rite: Nusach Ashkenaz
- Ecclesiastical or organizational status: Synagogue (1875–1941); Warehouse (from 1950s); Cultural center (since 2013)
- Status: Closed (as a synagogue); Repurposed

Location
- Location: Svilarska Street 10, Koprivnica
- Country: Croatia
- Interactive map of Koprivnica Synagogue
- Coordinates: 46°09′51.4″N 16°49′55.3″E

Architecture
- Architects: Hönigsberg & Deutsch (1875); Slavko Löwy (1937)
- Type: Synagogue architecture
- Style: Moorish Revival
- Established: c. 1869 (as a congregation)
- Completed: 1875

Cultural Good of Croatia
- Official name: Synagogue (Croatian: Sinagoga)
- Type: Listed building
- Reference no.: Z-3382

The Koprivnica Synagogue (Croatian: Koprivnička sinagoga) is a former Reform Jewish synagogue, located in Koprivnica, Croatia. The congregation worshiped in the Ashkenazi rite. Completed in 1875 and used as a synagogue until World War II, the building has been used as the Krešimir Švarc Cultural Center, a cultural center, since 2013.

== History ==
In 1869, around a hundred Jews lived in Koprivnica. Although relatively small, the Jewish community of Koprivnica funded the construction of the Koprivnica Synagogue. The synagogue was designed by the architectural firm Hönigsberg & Deutsch and built in 1875, along with a Jewish school. The location of the synagogue, in the heart of Koprivnica, was a prestigious choice at the time. In 1937, the synagogue was thoroughly remodeled by architect Slavko Löwy.

During World War II, the synagogue was destroyed and used as a prison. The organ and some other items from the synagogue were saved and are now preserved at the Koprivnica Museum. The Jewish community of Koprivnica was devastated during the war, with most of its members perishing in the Holocaust. The last rabbi of Koprivnica's Jewish community was Izrael Kohn who was taken to the Gospić concentration camp in the night between July 23 and July 24, 1941 and eventually died in Jasenovac.

The Koprivnica Synagogue is one of the few synagogues in Croatia to survive the war. After the war, under the communist regime of SFR Yugoslavia, the synagogue was used as a tailoring factory and warehouse. Presently, a small Jewish community exists in Koprivnica.

In 2011, restoration of the Koprivnica Synagogue began and it was listed as a cultural monument. Further restoration of the building was announced in late 2023.

== See also ==
- History of the Jews in Croatia
- List of synagogues in Croatia
