= Karlovac Synagogue =

Former synagogue in Karlovac, Croatia

- Croatian: Karlovačka sinagoga
- An undated image of the former synagogue

Religion
- Affiliation: Orthodox Judaism (former)
- Rite: Nusach Ashkenaz
- Ecclesiastical or organizational status: Synagogue (1870–c. 1940); Warehouse (c. 1945–c. 1960)
- Status: Destroyed

Location
- Location: Šebetićeva Street 5, Karlovac
- Country: Croatia

Architecture
- Architects: Ljudevit Kappner; Ernest Mühlbauer
- Type: Synagogue architecture
- Style: Renaissance Revival; Gothic Revival
- Established: 1852 (as a congregation)
- Completed: 1870
- Destroyed: c. 1960
- Direction of façade: East

Karlovac Synagogue (Croatian: Karlovačka sinagoga) was an Orthodox Jewish synagogue, located in Karlovac, Croatia. The congregation worshiped in the Ashkenazi rite. Completed in 1870, the synagogue was destroyed in c. 1960. A memorial plaque is located at the site of the former synagogue, at Šebetićeva Street 5.

== History ==
The Jewish community in Karlovac was founded in 1852. The Karlovac Synagogue was built under Filip Rajner, president of the Jewish community Karlovac, who liked to call himself "Croatian nationalist of Moses religion". Completed in 1870 in the Renaissance Revival and Gothic Revival styles with five rosette on the façade as a symbol of the Pentateuch, the synagogue faces east, towards Eretz Yisrael. Consecrated in 1871, the synagogue had an organ inside.

During World War II, the synagogue was turned into a warehouse. After the war, around 1960, the Karlovac Synagogue was demolished.

== See also ==
- History of the Jews in Croatia
- List of synagogues in Croatia
