= Sisak Synagogue =

Former synagogue in Sisak, Croatia

- Croatian: Sisačka sinagoga
- An undated image of the former synagogue

- Location of the former synagogue in Croatia

Religion
- Affiliation: Judaism (former)
- Rite: Nusach Ashkenaz
- Ecclesiastical or organizational status: Synagogue (1870–c. 1942); Music school (since c. 1968)
- Status: Closed (as a synagogue); Repurposed

Location
- Location: 2 Ljudevita Posavskog Square, Sisak
- Country: Croatia
- Interactive map of Sisak Synagogue
- Coordinates: 45°29′16″N 16°22′27″E

Architecture
- Architect: Franjo Klein
- Type: Synagogue architecture
- Style: Romanesque Revival; Neo-Mudéjar
- Completed: 1880
- Materials: Brick

The Sisak Synagogue (Croatian: Sisačka sinagoga) is a former Jewish congregation and synagogue, located in Sisak, Croatia. Designed by Franjo Klein in the Romanesque Revival style and completed in 1880, the synagogue was devastated and robbed during World War II. The synagogue has served as the Fran Lhotka Music School, a music school, since c. 1968.

== History ==
Beno Heisz served as the founding rabbi and was killed during the Holocaust in 1943.

A memorial plaque was placed on the former synagogue building in 1999, in honor of those in the congregation who perished in the Holocaust.

The former synagogue suffered serious damage as the result of the 6.4 magnitude Petrinja earthquake that struck central Croatia in late 2020.

== Gallery ==
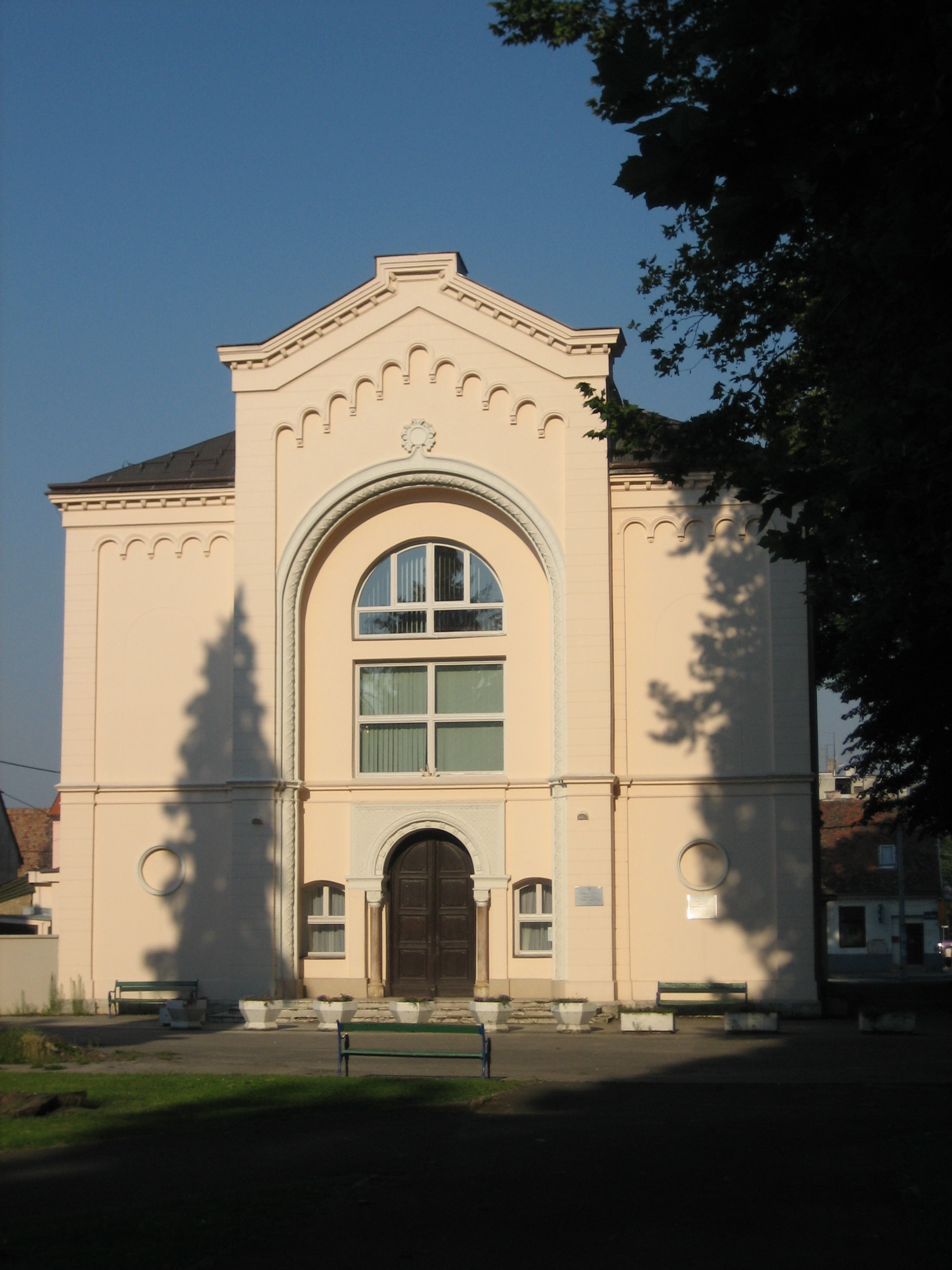
The synagogue as a music school

== See also ==
- History of the Jews in Croatia
- List of synagogues in Croatia
