= Rijeka Synagogue =

Former synagogue in Rijeka, Croatia

- Croatian: Riječka sinagoga
- An undated image of the former synagogue

- Location of the destroyed synagogue in Croatia

Religion
- Affiliation: Neolog Judaism (former)
- Rite: Nusach Ashkenaz
- Ecclesiastical or organizational status: Synagogue (1903–1944)
- Status: Destroyed

Location
- Location: Rijeka, Primorje-Gorski Kotar County
- Country: Croatia
- Interactive map of Rijeka Synagogue
- Coordinates: 45.32699°N 14.44202°E

Architecture
- Architect: Lipót Baumhorn
- Type: Synagogue architecture
- Style: Art Nouveau
- Established: September 26, 1781 (as a congregation)
- Completed: 1903
- Destroyed: January 25, 1944
- Materials: Red brick

The Rijeka Synagogue (Croatian: Riječka sinagoga), also called the Great Synagogue of Rijeka, was a former Neolog Jewish synagogue, located in Rijeka, Croatia. Completed in 1903, the synagogue served as the main synagogue of the city until it was destroyed by Nazis in 1944.

== History ==
The first Jews settled in Rijeka from the Italian Adriatic coast in the 15th century. The Jewish community of Rijeka was established on September 26, 1781. The first Rijeka synagogue was located in a three-storey house. In 1901, the Jewish community of Rijeka had 2,600 members.

The Jewish community of Rijeka collected voluntary contributions for the construction of the synagogue. Construction began in 1902 at Via del Pomerio 31, and it was finished on September 18, 1903. The new synagogue was opened on the holiday of the Jewish New Year, Rosh Hashanah, October 22, 1903.

The synagogue was a square-layout tower with a cupola above the shrine and two smaller cupolas at the entrance façade. Red façade brick was used for decoration, while the façade was emphasized with white horizontal lines and small relief architectural decorations. Large openings of pointy arched three-light mullioned windows were prominent on the façade. The interior of the synagogue was built in the Mudéjar style.

After German retreat from the area of Rijeka, the building was set on fire on January 25, 1944, and the price of its restoration was too high so the remains of the damaged synagogue were sold as construction material. Today at the site of the grandiose synagogue there is an inscription describing the former building.

The Rijeka Orthodox Synagogue, a much smaller and Orthodox synagogue, served as the synagogue for both congregations following the destruction of the Great Synagogue. The Rijeka Orthodox Synagogue was completed in 1931 in the Rationalist style, and is one of the very few Croatian synagogues that survived the destruction of the Nazi period.

== Gallery ==
Original building

== See also ==
- History of the Jews in Croatia
- List of synagogues in Croatia
