= Beno Heisz =

Rabbi Beno Heisz
- Died: Independent State of Croatia

Religious life
- Religion: Judaism
- Denomination: Orthodox Judaism
- Synagogue: Sisak Synagogue
- Position: Rabbi

Beno Heisz (died 1943) was the rabbi of the Sisak Synagogue.

With the establishment of the Independent State of Croatia and the rise to power of the Ustashe (the only quisling forces in Europe who operated their own extermination camps), the Sisak Synagogue was devastated and looted. Rabbi Beno Heisz shared the fate of the other Croatian Jews and was killed in 1943.
