= Izrael Kohn =

Rabbi Izrael Kohn

Personal life
- Born: 1885 Poland (?)
- Died: 1941 (aged 55–56) Jasenovac, Independent State of Croatia
- Spouse: Lina Breier
- Children: Frida, Gena, Marko

Religious life
- Religion: Judaism
- Denomination: Orthodox Judaism

Jewish leader
- Position: Rabbi
- Synagogue: Koprivnica Synagogue
- Began: 1924
- Ended: 1941

Izrael Kohn (1885–1941) was the last rabbi of the Koprivnica Synagogue.

== Biography ==
Kohn was the last rabbi of Koprivnica's Jewish community. He became rabbi in Koprivnica in 1924. He came to the Kingdom of Serbs, Croats and Slovenes from Poland. He was by then already a trained rabbi with a PhD. He married Lina Breier, by whom he had three daughters: Frida, Gena, plus a daughter with an unknown name, and a son, Marko. He is said to have lived secluded and modestly with his family in Koprivnica.

In the night between 23 July and 24 July 1941, he, along with his whole family and other Jews from Koprivnica, was taken by the Ustashe to the Gospić concentration camp, and eventually died in Jasenovac. His son Marko perished in Jasenovac as well.
