= Slavko Löwy =

Croatian architect

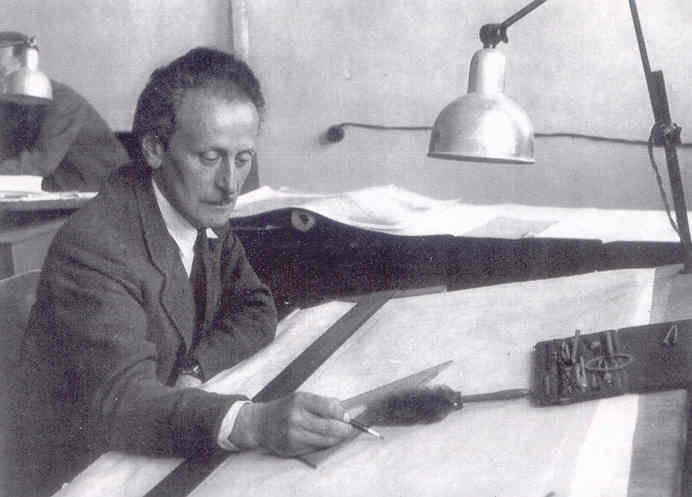
- Löwy, c. 1950
- Born: 7 August 1904; Koprivnica, Kingdom of Croatia-Slavonia, Austria-Hungary
- Died: 1 April 1996 (aged 91); Zagreb, Croatia

Slavko Löwy (August 7, 1904 – April 1, 1996) was a Croatian architect.

== Background, family and education ==
Löwy was born in Koprivnica to a respectable and wealthy Croatian Jewish family, who were engaged in trade. In Koprivnica he attended the gymnasium school, and after graduation in 1923, he was enrolled in the Vienna Technical College. After four semesters, in 1925 he continued his studies in Zagreb at the Department of Architecture at Royal Technical College. In 1927 he continued his education in Dresden, where he graduated in 1930.

== Career ==
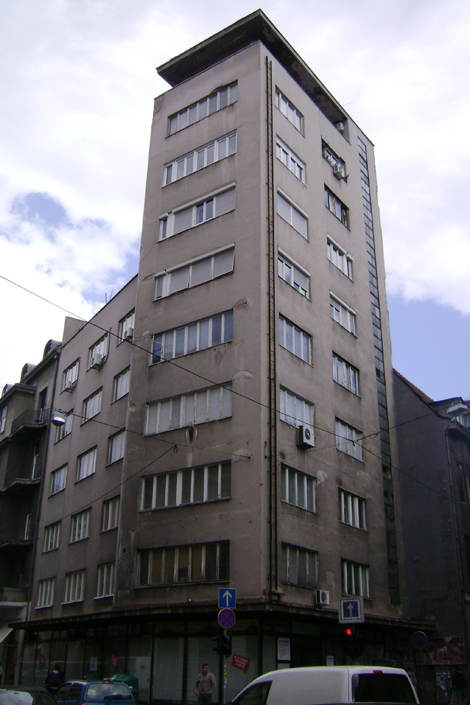
Lowy's building on Masarykova street

Löwy moved to Zagreb, in 1930, where he started working in the architectural studio of Ignjat Fischer. In 1931 in collaboration with Vlado Antolić, Löwy starts a tender for the city Savings Bank project in Sarajevo. That same year he moved into the architectural studio of Stanko Kliske. Löwy became a licensed architect in 1931, and that same year he established his own architectural studio, „Löwy“. That same year he performed his first self-derived house in Petrić Street 7, at the space of the former Zagreb Trust block. He married his wife Terezija Rakić in 1932, and on November 8, 1933, Löwy son Miroslav was born.

Löwy realized his most important achievement in 1933, the nine floors skyscraper in Masarykova street, which will be called the "first skyscraper of Zagreb". He moved his architectural studio, in 1934, at the top floor of that same skyscraper, in Masarykova street, that he designed. From 1934 until 1941 Löwy implemented a number of major housing and business establishments in Zagreb, which belong to the very top of Croatian modernism.

In 1945 he started to work on reconstruction of the Nama department stores in Croatia, Slovenia and Bosnia and Herzegovina. In 1946 Löwy was forcibly moved by communists regime to the Bureau of Architecture project (APZ), where he worked on the types of "rational residential buildings. Since 1950 until 1953 he was also forcibly moved to Macedonia, Skopje, where he designed the public buildings. Apartment with his studio, in Masarykova street, were returned to him in 1953 when he returned to Zagreb. After return Löwy renewed his studio in the original space. In 1962 the "Architectural firm Löwy" is merged with "Tehnoprojekt".

== Personal life ==
In 1942 the work of Löwy architectural studio was prohibited by Nazis and NDH regime. Apartment with his studio, in Masarykova street, was taken away from him, and most project documentation of his studio has been destroyed. Löwy parents were immediately deported to Nazi death camps, and he somehow survived while hiding in Zagreb, one of his hiding places was truss of Art Pavilion in Zagreb. Surviving members of his family claim that Löwy has changed, in that period, as many as 17 locations in Zagreb as he hide from Nazis and NDH regime. After the World War II things were not much better for Löwy. Under communists regime of newly founded SFR Yugoslavia he had a problems for being a Jew, but his acquaintance with sculptor Augustinčić partially helped him through those times.

== Retirement and death ==
He retired in 1966. In 1970 he was awarded with the prize of Viktor Kovačić for a lifetime achievement, and in 1977 he was also awarded with the prize of Vladimir Nazor for a lifetime achievement.

Löwy died on April 1, 1996, on the 9th floor of his apartment and studio skyscraper in Masarykova Street.

== Works ==
=== Zagreb ===
- Residential and commercial building Grünsberg, Petrićeva 7, 1932–1933.
- Residential and commercial building Schlenger, Bogovićeva 4, 1932–1933.
- Hirschler residential house, Gornje Prekrižje 2, 1932–1933.
- Nossan residential house, Zvonimirova 23, 1932–1933.
- Residential and commercial building Radovan, Masarykova 22, 1933. – 1934.
- Polak residential house, Tuškanova 15, 1936. – 1937.
- Lebinec residential house, Ribnjak 20, 1936. – 1937.
- Federbuš residential house, Novakova 19, 1936. – 1937.
- Residential and commercial building Schlenger, Boškovićeva 7b, 1936. – 1937.
- Wiener Bankverein residential house, Bulićeva 4, 1936. – 1937.
- Residential and commercial building Jadranskog osiguravajućeg društva, Draškovićeva 13, 1936. – 1937.
- Residential and commercial building Radovan, Savska 8, 1937.
- Beck residential house, Vinkovićeva 8, 1937.
- Prpić residential house, Solovljeva 22, 1938.
- Marko Kasumović villa, Njegoševa 1, 1936. - 1938.
- Löwy residential house, Mandrovićeva 12, 1938. – 1939.
- Bukovačka 149, 1941.
- Pichler residential house, Grškovićeva 7, 1941.
- Master workshop Vanje Radauša, Zmajevac 8, 1949.
- Master workshop Antuna Augustinčića, Jabukovac 10, 1949.
- Residential buildings factory „Rade Končar“, Gajnice, 1949.
- Residential buildings, Galjufova 4 – 12, 1949.
- Steiner residential house, Grškovićeva 25, 1955.
- Dorm „Cvjetno naselje“, Odranska 8, 1955.
- Nursing home „Lavoslav Švarc“, Bukovačka 55, 1955. – 1956.
- Economics institute, Kennedyjev trg 7, 1957. – 1963.
- Restaurant „Trnjanka“, Trnjanska cesta 31, 1959. – 1960.
- Dorm „Ante Starčević“, Ljubljanska avenija 2, 1961.
- Dorm „Stjepan Radić“, Horvoćanska cesta/ Jarunska cesta 2, 1961.

=== Croatia ===
- Arrangement of the Jewish cemetery, Koprivnica, 1930.
- Memorial to the Jews who died in World War I in the town of Koprivnica cemetery, Koprivnica, 1930.
- Löwy family tomb, Koprivnica, 1930.
- Remaking of the Koprivnica Synagogue, 1937.
- Elektroprimorje administration building, Viktora Cara Emina 2, Rijeka, 1953. – 1955.
- Central substation, Grohovčeva 2, Rijeka, 1960.
- Dorm, I. G. Kovačića 4, Osijek, 1962.
- Dorm Podmurvica, Čandekova 4, Rijeka, 1963.
- Excursion forest management „Crna Gora“, Koprivnica, 1970.
- Residential family house Švarc, Krešimirov trg 5, Koprivnica, 1973.
- Memorial to the Jews who died in World War I in the town of Koprivnica cemetery, (modification of the monument from 1930.)

=== Other countries ===
- The city public beach, Skopje, Macedonia, 1950–1951
- Student village, Skopje, Macedonia, 1950–1951
- Administrative centre, Skopje, Macedonia, 1952–1953
- Disabled persons home, Skopje, Macedonia, 1953
- City hotel with a Vardar promenade Vardar, Skopje, Macedonia
- Department store, Skopje, Macedonia, 1957
- Federal Chamber of Commerce building, Belgrade, Serbia, 1958–1965

== Bibliography ==
- Snješka Knežević, Aleksander Laslo (2011). Židovski Zagreb. Zagreb: AGM, Židovska općina Zagreb. ISBN 978-953-174-393-8.
