= Dubrovnik Synagogue =

Orthodox synagogue in Dubrovnik, Croatia

Dubrovnik Synagogue Old Synagogue
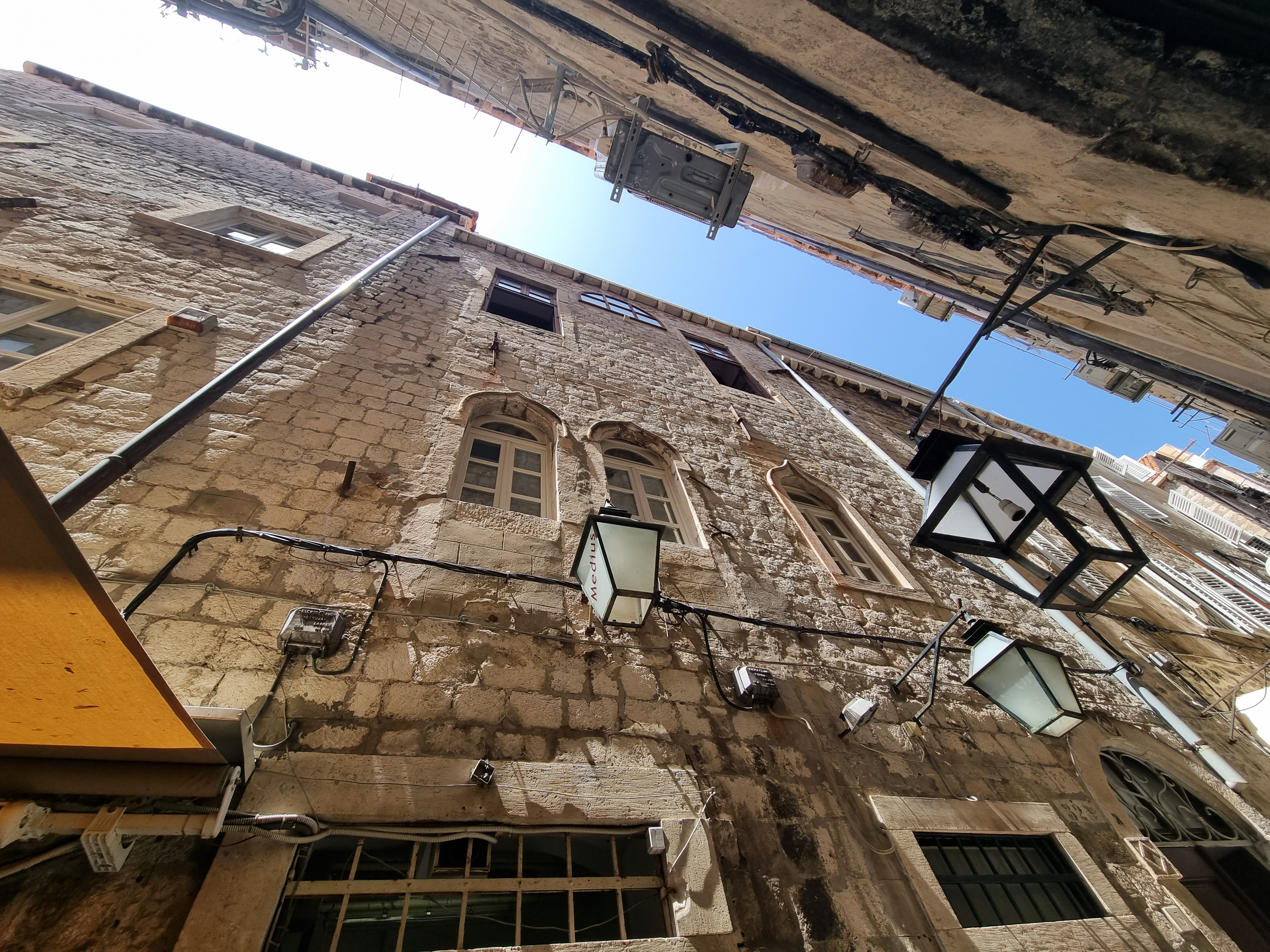
- The exterior of the synagogue in Old town Dubrovnik

- Location of the synagogue in Croatia

Religion
- Affiliation: Orthodox Judaism
- Rite: Nusach Edot HaMizrach
- Ecclesiastical or organizational status: Synagogue
- Status: Active (High Holy Days only)

Location
- Location: Žudioska 5, Old Town, Dubrovnik, Dubrovnik-Neretva County
- Country: Croatia
- Interactive map of Dubrovnik Synagogue; Old Synagogue
- Coordinates: 42°39′02″N 18°05′29″E

Architecture
- Type: Synagogue architecture
- Style: Baroque

The Dubrovnik Synagogue, commonly called the Old Synagogue, is an Orthodox Jewish synagogue, located in Dubrovnik, Croatia. The synagogue is the oldest Sefardic synagogue in use in the world and the second oldest synagogue in Europe. It is said to have been established in 1352, but gained legal status in the city in 1408. Owned by the local Jewish community, the main floor functions as a place of worship for the High Holy Days and special occasions, and is now mainly a Jewish museum which hosts numerous ritual items and centuries-old artefacts.

== Location ==
Located in one of the many tiny streets of the Old Town of Dubrovnik, it is connected to a neighboring building which has long been owned by the Tolentino family, who have been caretakers of the synagogue for centuries. The internal layout is different from other European synagogues and has undergone numerous refurbishments throughout the centuries, and has a mixture of designs from different eras. The building has sustained damage several times, with the great earthquake in 1667, World War II, and the Croatian War of Independence in the 1990s. The damage has been restored as closely as possible to its original design, and the synagogue reopened in 1997. The small museum contains many artefacts from throughout the Jewish community's history in the city.

== History ==
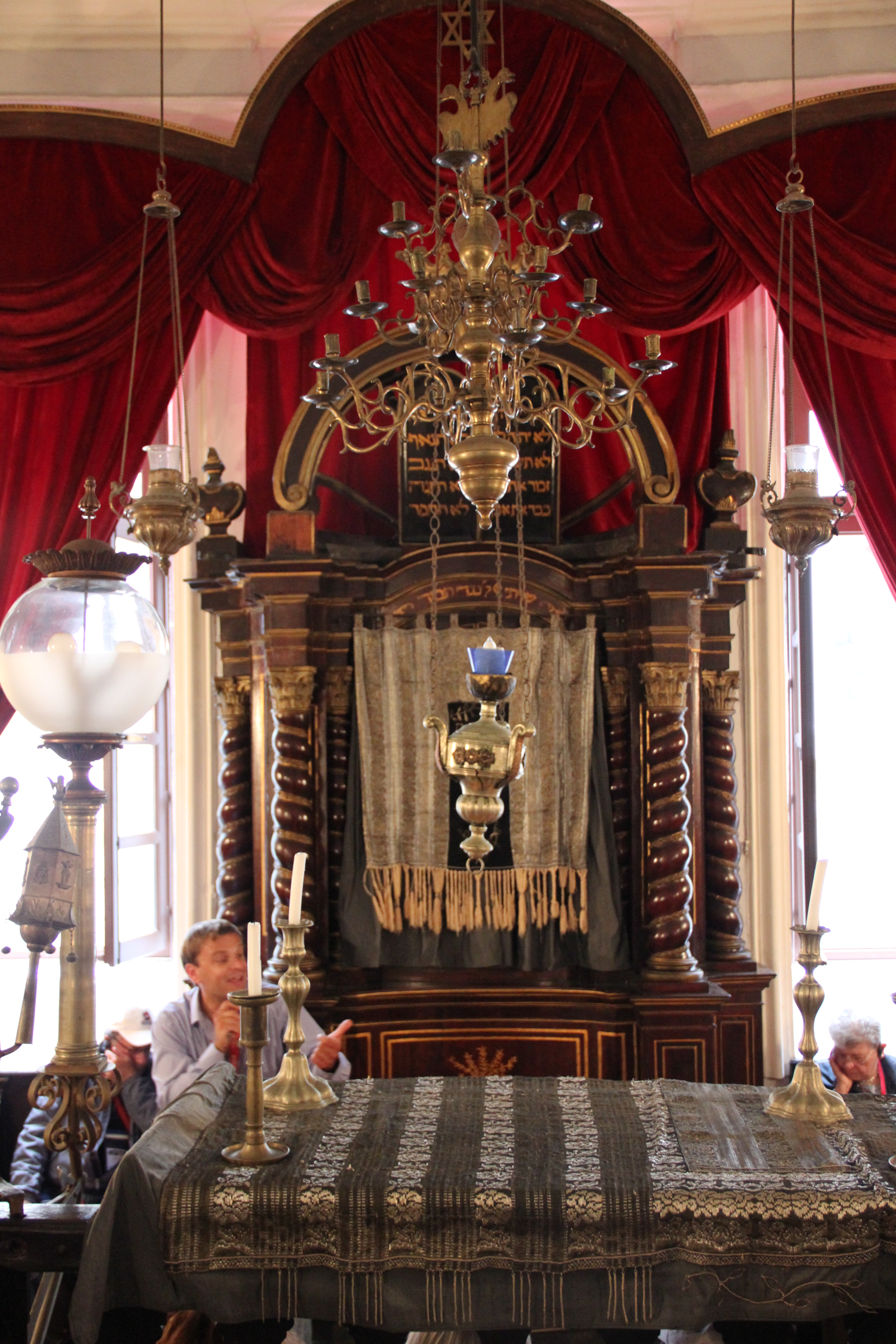
Interior view of the Synagogue

=== 16th to 19th centuries ===
After the expulsion of the Jews from Spain in 1492, many of the expelled went east and some eventually settled into independent city of Dubrovnik, where there was already a small Jewish community. In 1546, Dubrovnik officials allocated a Jewish settlement within the city, with the main street being called Žudioska ulica ("Jewish Street") in the Dubrovnik Ghetto. The 1667 Dubrovnik earthquake caused much damage to the city, including the synagogue.

=== 20th century and after ===
During the Croatian War of Independence, the city was besieged by the Serbian and Montenegrin paramilitary forces in what has been called the Siege of Dubrovnik. Approximately two thirds of the old city was in some way damaged, including the synagogue, where shells and grenades hit the adjacent buildings in 1991, shattering the windows of the sanctuary and Jewish Community Headquarters. In 1992, an artillery shell hit through the roof of the synagogue, causing the congregation to pack up over 80 items to send to the Yeshiva University museum, which included a 13th-century Torah and silver ornaments and textiles. After the war ended, a legal battle ensued between a Manhattan doctor Michael Papo, former president of Dubrovnik community and a direct descendant of Tolentino family, and at the time leader of the Dubrovnik Jewish community late Dr. Bruno Horowitz and the state of Croatia over the synagogue's treasures; eventually, a court ruled in 1998 that the treasures be returned to Dubrovnik.

Today, because of the small number of Jews in Dubrovnik, the synagogue does not have its own rabbi. On holy days, a visiting rabbi would conduct services for the small community. In 2003, Israeli president Moshe Katsav visited the Dubrovnik synagogue on a visit to Croatia.

== Gallery ==
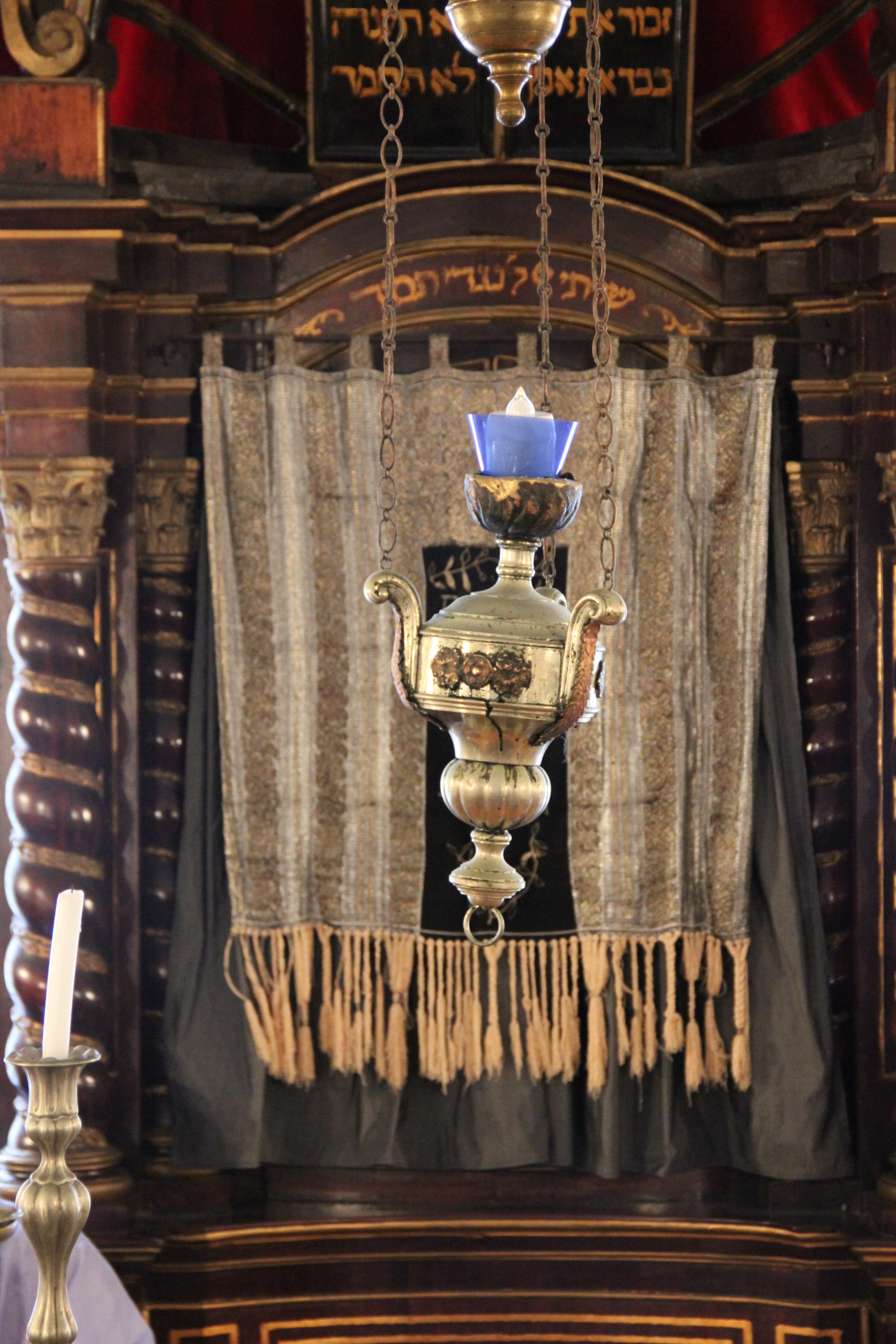

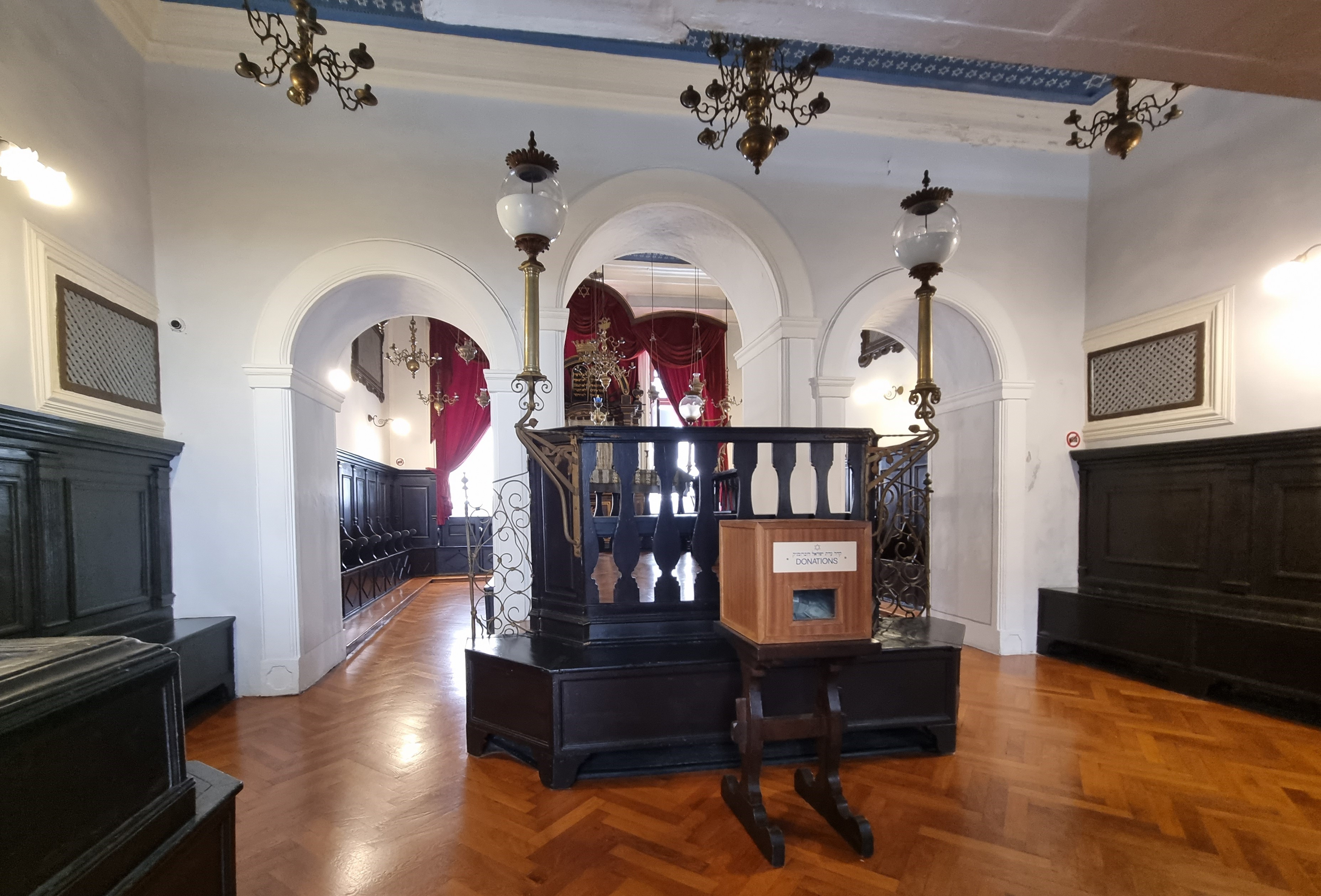

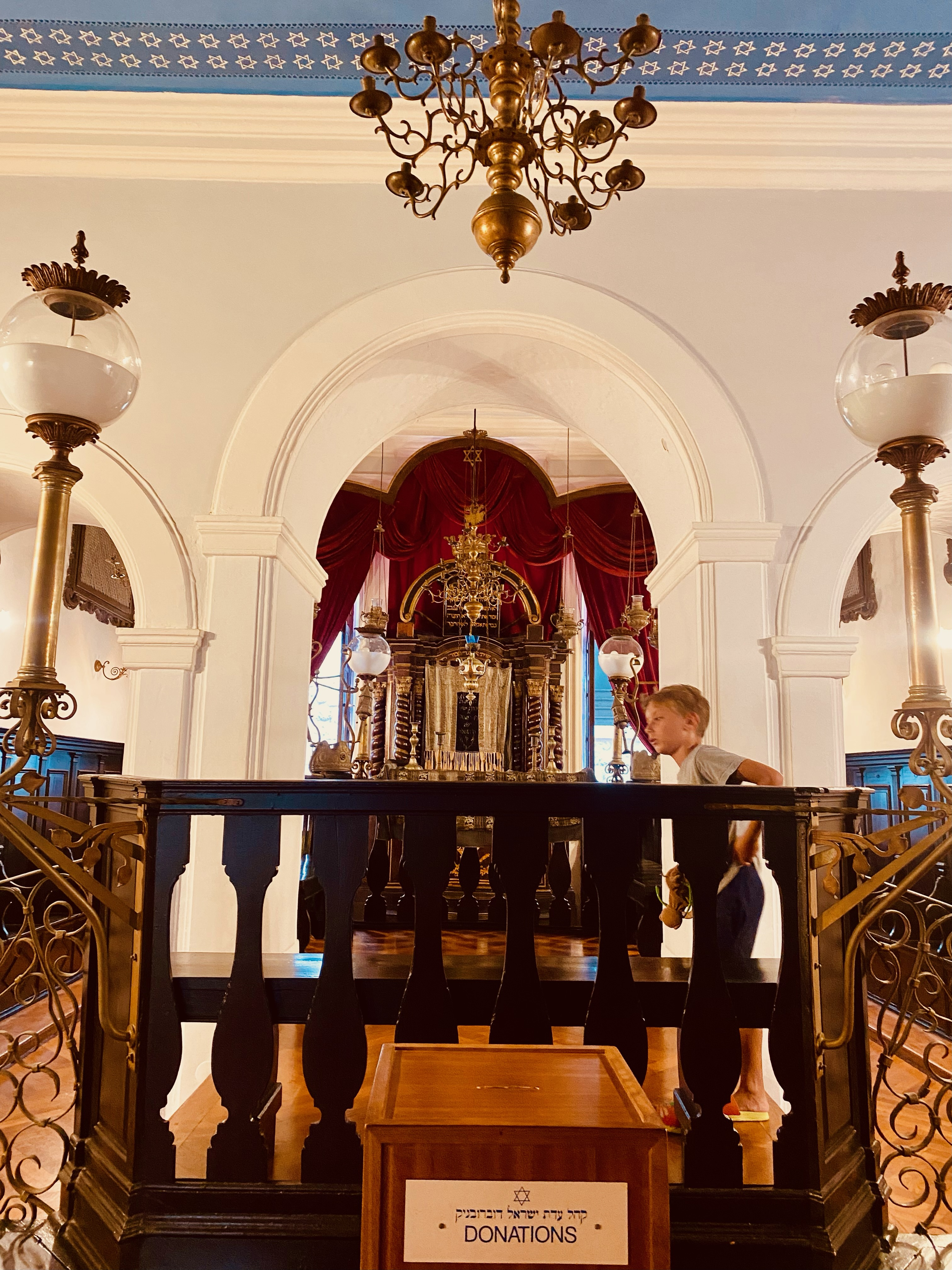

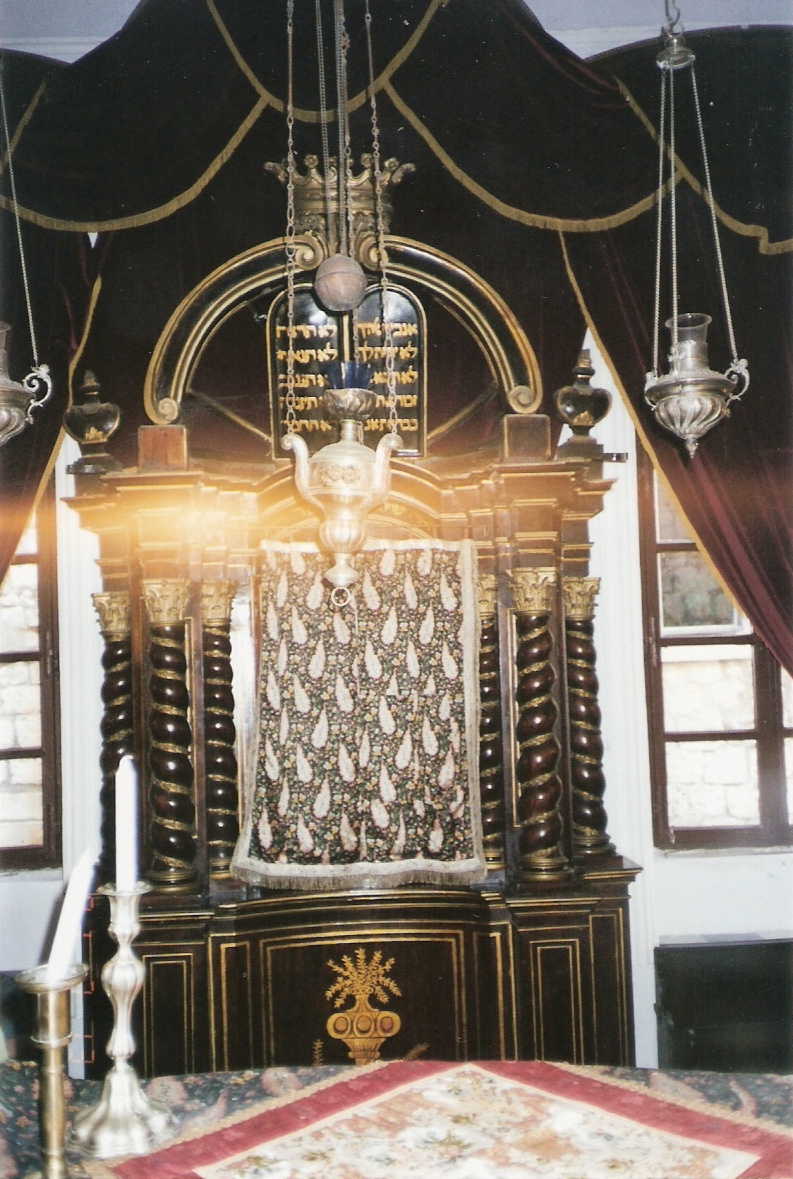

== See also ==
- History of the Jews in Croatia
- List of oldest synagogues in the world
- List of synagogues in Croatia
