= Split Synagogue =

Orthodox synagogue in Split, Croatia

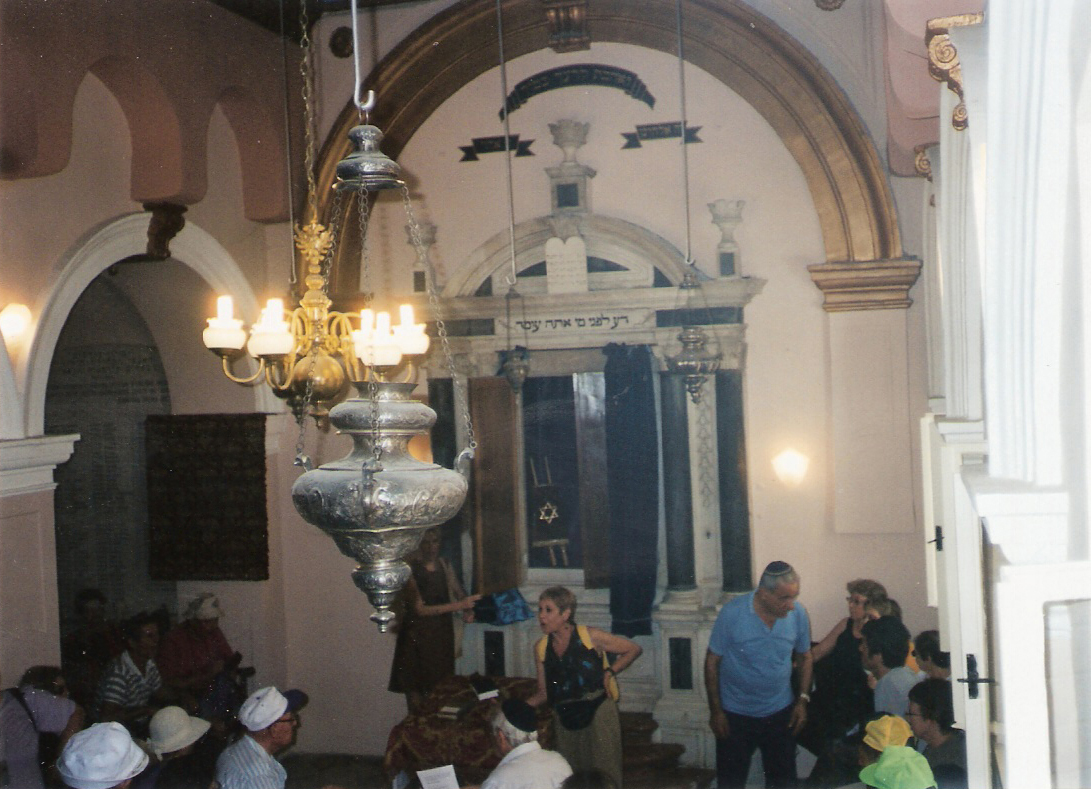
- Interior of the synagogue, in 2001

- Location of the synagogue in Croatia

Religion
- Affiliation: Orthodox Judaism
- Rite: Nusach Sefard
- Ecclesiastical or organizational status: Synagogue
- Year consecrated: c. 1507
- Status: Active

Location
- Location: Židovski Prolaz, Diocletian's Palace, Split, Split-Dalmatia County
- Country: Croatia
- Interactive map of Split Synagogue
- Coordinates: 43°30′33″N 16°26′22″E

Architecture
- Completed: c. 1500

Website
- www.zost.hr

The Split Synagogue is an Orthodox Jewish synagogue, located in Split, Croatia. Built in the early 1500s, the synagogue is one of the oldest Sefardic synagogues in use today.

Located on a small street called Židovski Prolaz (Jewish Lane), the synagogue was built into the western wall of Diocletian's Palace by Jews escaping the Inquisition in Spain and Portugal. In 1573, a Jewish cemetery was approved and built on Marjan Hill, which overlooks the city of Split.

== History ==
Romans established the city of Salona just north of modern-day Split in the 1st Century, where Jewish traders and craftsmen settled. Archaeological excavations have discovered artifacts of Jewish origin dating from this period, including a pendant, ceramic oil lamps decorated with menorahs, a fragment of a Jewish sarcophagus marked with a menorah, and a tombstones of a Syrian Jew named Malhos. Further excavations suggest the existence of a synagogue dating back to the time of Diocletian who was Roman Emperor from 284 to 305. The arrival of the Avars dispersed the community, but it was revived by the 16th century with the arrival of Sephardi Jews from Spain. Then there were two groups of Jews: Ponentine (from Italy or Spain) and Levantine (from the Ottoman east).

After a great fire ravaged an earlier place of worship in 1507, the Jewish community established the current synagogue in the northwest corner of Diocletian's Palace. One of the most notable members of the community was Daniel Rodriguez (Daniel Rodriga), who established a prosperous warehouse and business transporting goods from the Orient to Venice.

During World War II, Italian Fascists ransacked the synagogue and destroyed various religious objects, books, and scrolls in a bonfire in the town's main square. The Nazis and Ustaše then deported the Jews left in the city, with over 50% perishing by the end of the war.

The synagogue was restored after World War II, and subsequently renovated in 1996 and 2015. The building also houses the Jewish community headquarters of Split.

== Cemetery ==
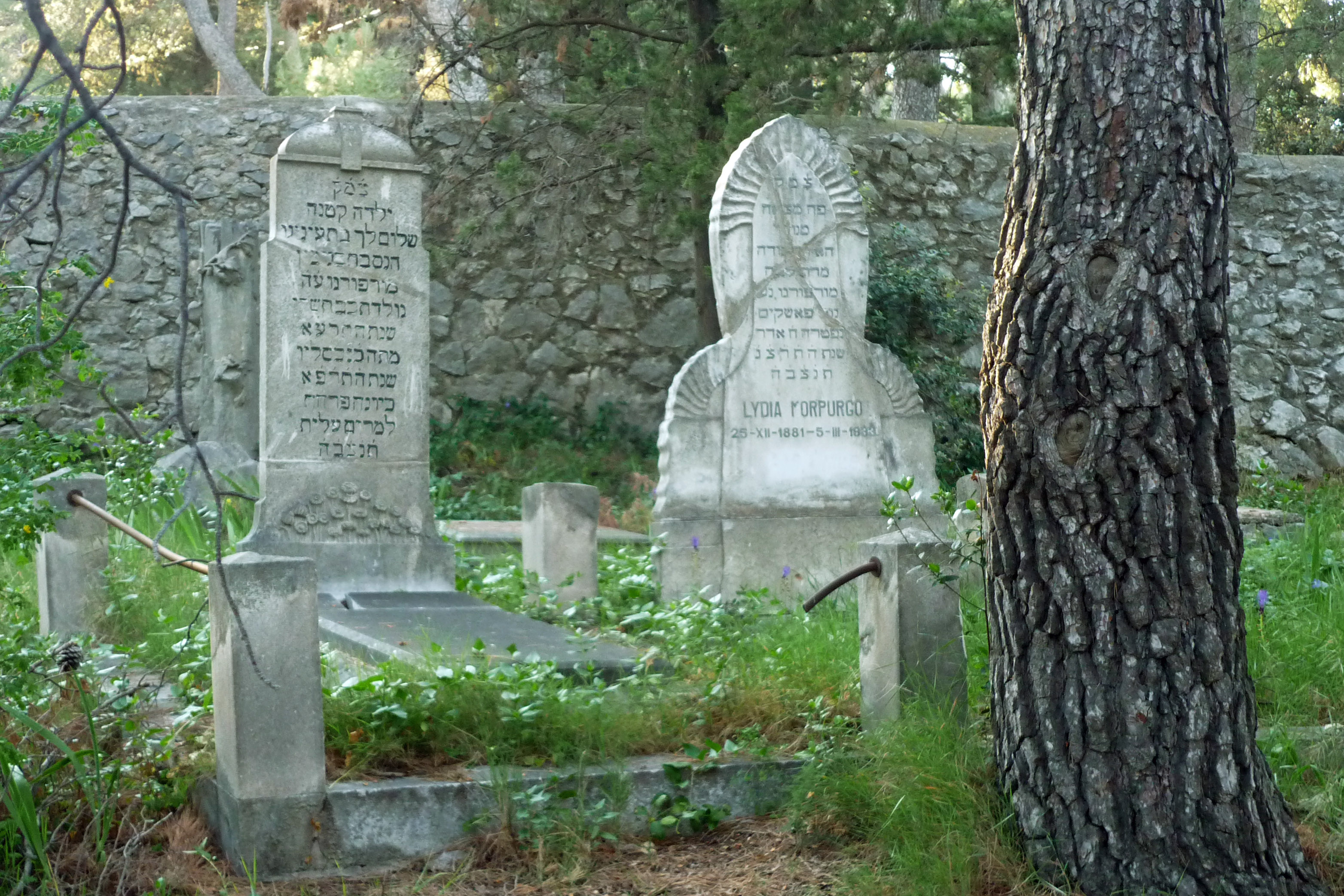
Graves inside the Jewish cemetery.

The old Jewish cemetery is located on Mount Marjan, a hill overlooking Split. It was established in 1573, and contains 700 tombstones, the oldest dating from 1717. The tombstones are in the Sephardi tradition, with some shaped like a sarcophagus roof, while others are flat, slightly inclined rectangular slabs. The inscriptions in Hebrew, although some of the newer monuments contain either Italian or Croatian. The entrance gate to the cemetery is next to a café that had formerly functioned as a mikveh, and still inscribed with the Jewish prayer Tziduk Hadin at the entrance.

The new Jewish cemetery is located in the city's Lovrinac municipal cemetery, which also contains a Holocaust memorial.

== See also ==
- History of the Jews in Croatia
- List of synagogues in Croatia
