= History of the Jews in Dubrovnik =

Jewish community of Dubrovnik

The Jewish community of Dubrovnik (modern day Croatia) existed as early as the 15th century, and grew significantly with the arrival of Jews and Marranos expelled from Spain and Portugal. The Jews of Dubrovnik played a significant role in the trade and diplomatic relations of the Republic of Ragusa but also experienced expulsions, restrictions and persecution. The Jews of Dubrovnik gained legal equality in the 19th century. The community was decimated in the Holocaust during the Second World War. Due to that and to the subsequent emigration, the community currently numbers about 30 members.

== 15th to 19th centuries ==
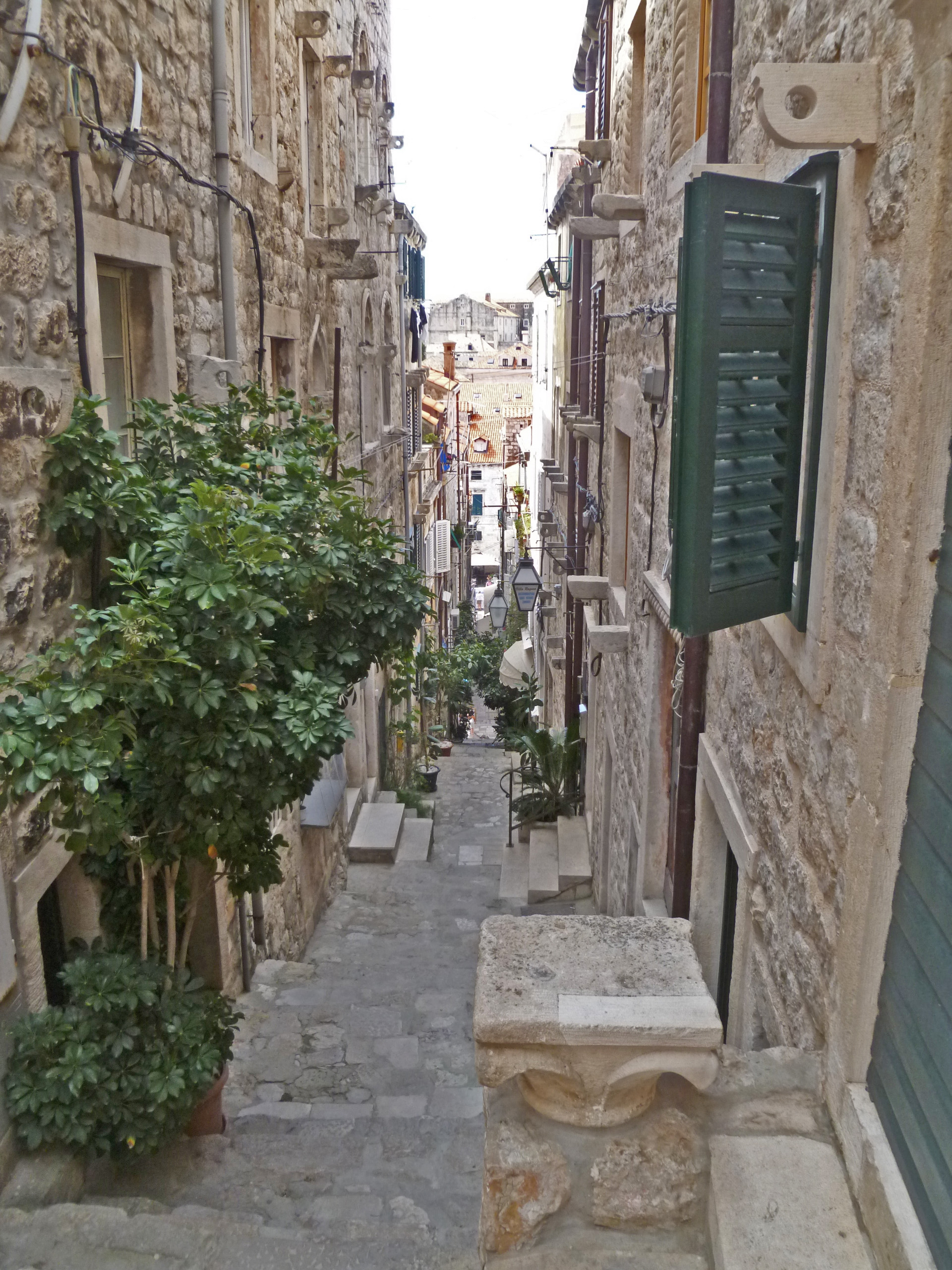
The Jewish Street (Ulica Žudioska) was the main street of the ghetto and had gates locked during the night on both ends

The first Jew residing permanently in Dubrovnik was recorded in 1421 and a small community existed in the city in the 15th century. It grew significantly after the expulsion of the Jews from Spain in 1492, when many of the expelled went east and some eventually settled in the city-state of Dubrovnik, the Republic of Ragusa.

As the local merchant-patricians feared the competition from the newcomers, and due to the local clergy's desire to follow the example of other Christian states, an edict was passed in 1515 expelling Jews from the republic. The edict made exceptions for Jewish merchants visiting the city and for Jewish doctors. It appears that it was not consistently enforced and did not last a long time. Jews were living in Ploče in 1538 and two years later several buildings in Dubrovnik itself were designated Jewish dwellings.

Conversos (Marranos)—Jews from Spain and Portugal—came to the city as well; in May 1544, a ship landed there filled exclusively with Portuguese refugees. Many Jews became traders and craftsmen, dealing with spices, silks, fabrics, and crafts that were in demand at a seaport city. They played an important role in the commerce of the city with the majority of commercial agents being Jewish in 1572.

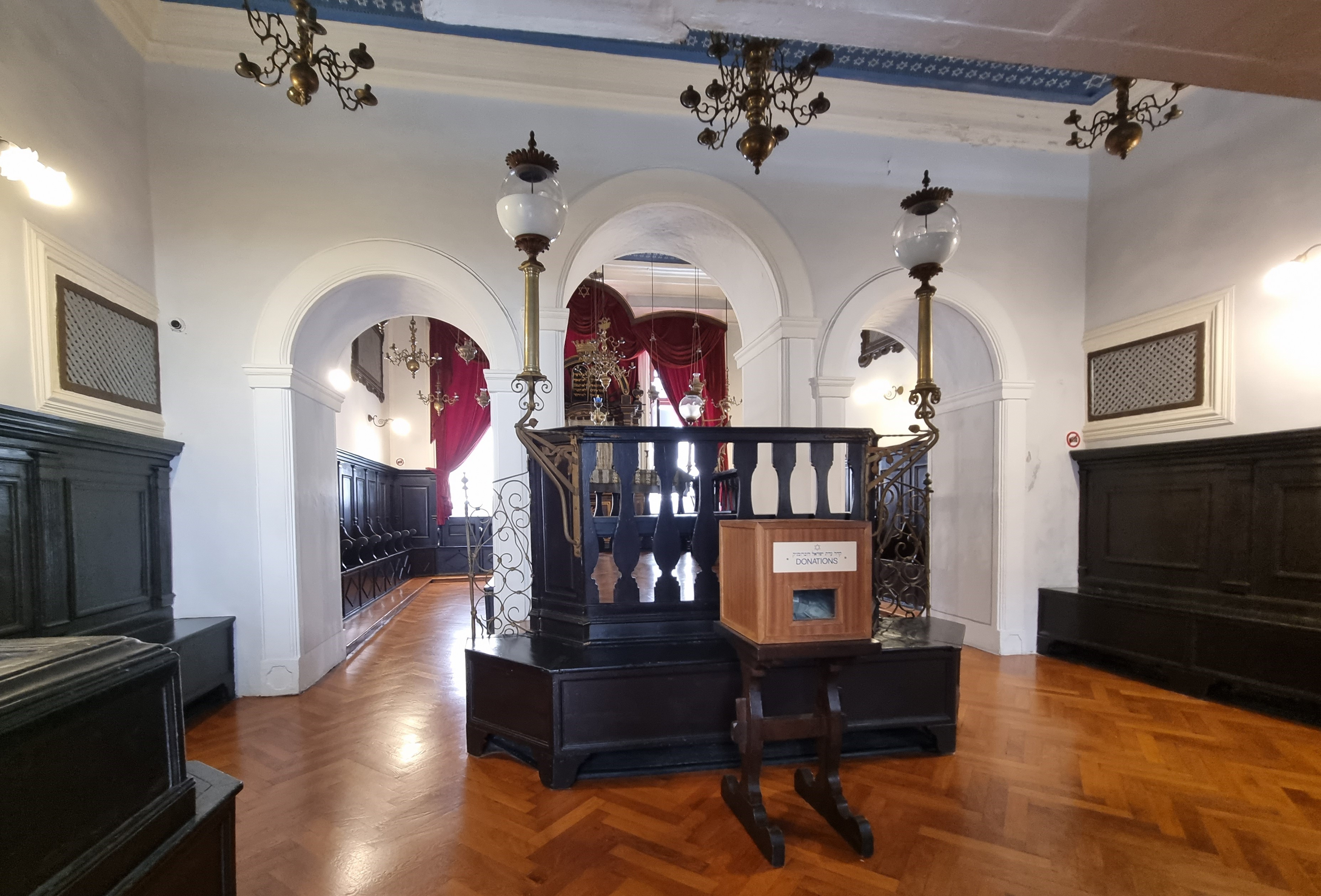
Interior of the Dubrovnik Synagogue

In 1546, Dubrovnik officials allocated a Jewish settlement within the city, with the main street being called Ulica Žudioska ("Jewish Street") in the Dubrovnik Ghetto. The ghetto included houses with storage space and a synagogue and was administered by its elected head. The residents paid a special tax and had to be inside the ghetto during the night, when its gates were locked. Some wealthy Jews lived outside of the ghetto in the city. Gracia Mendes, a philanthropist and businesswoman, had extensive economic interests in the city. When she came to Dubrovnik for a few months in 1553 she was received with pomp and lived near the Ploče gate. Afterwards she played an important role as an intermediary between the republic and the Ottoman Empire.

Located between the Ottoman Empire and the Christian lands, Dubrovnik was a meeting-point of both Christian and Muslim spies, such as David Passi. He had relatives in Italy and Constantinople and worked as a commercial agent in Dubrovnik, while likely being a double agent for Spaniards and Venetians.

Notable Marranos who lived and worked in Dubrovnik include the physician Amatus Lusitanus and the writer Didacus Pyrrhus.

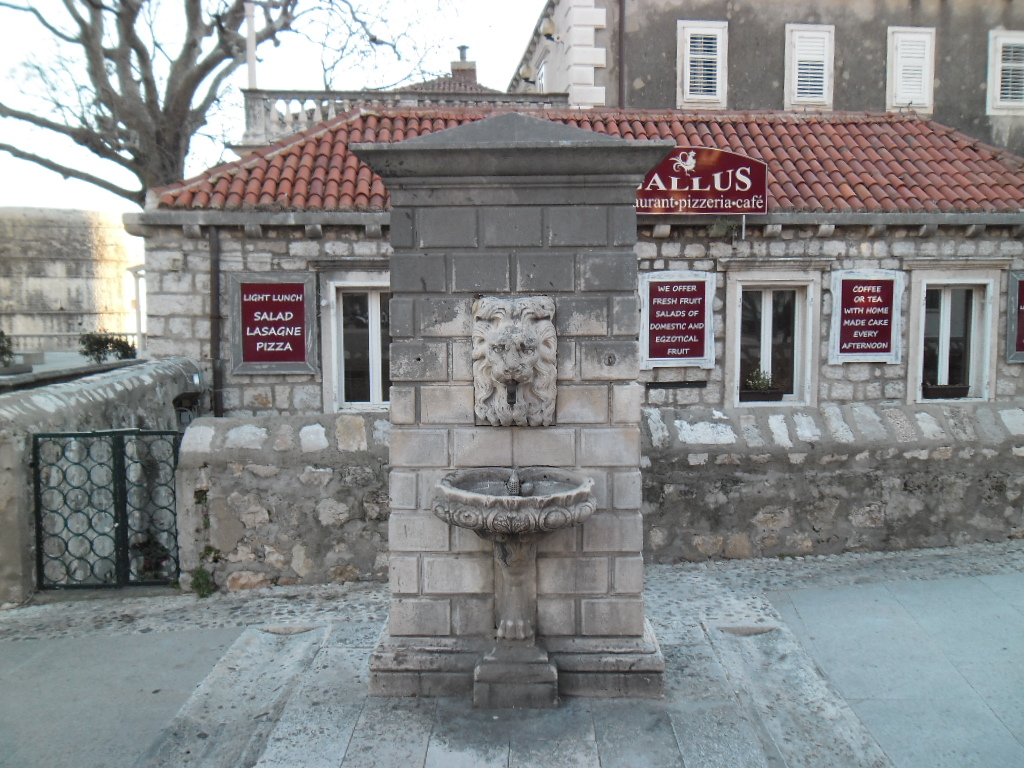
The Jewish fountain

After a Christian girl was found dead in 1622, a woman admitted to murdering her and spread a blood libel saying that she had been enticed to do it by a Jew, Isaac Jeshurun, who had needed the girl's blood for ritual purposes. Jeshurun was imprisoned for twenty years and spent three years in prison before the efforts of the community led to the commutation of the sentence. This outcome was considered a miracle by the Jews of Dubrovnik, however the substantial expenditures related to the case caused a conflict within the community. The restrictions imposed on the Jews of Dubrovnik led to the majority of them leaving the city for Venice or the Ottoman Empire. Only four families remained, among them that of Rabbi Aaron ben David Cohen. The restrictions were lifted or disregarded leading to a new resurgence, with 218 Jews out of the population of 6,000 in the 18th century. Jews participated in maritime ventures, maritime insurance and financing. Restrictions were imposed again in the second half of the 18th century when the republic entered a period of decline. The Jews could not engage in commerce and could not live outside the ghetto nor leave it at night.

When Dalmatia was occupied by Napoleonic forces, the Jews attained legal equality for the first time. In 1814, when the Austrian Empire annexed Dalmatia, legal equality was again withdrawn. Jews were granted legal equality under Croatian law in the mid 19th century.

== 20th century and after ==
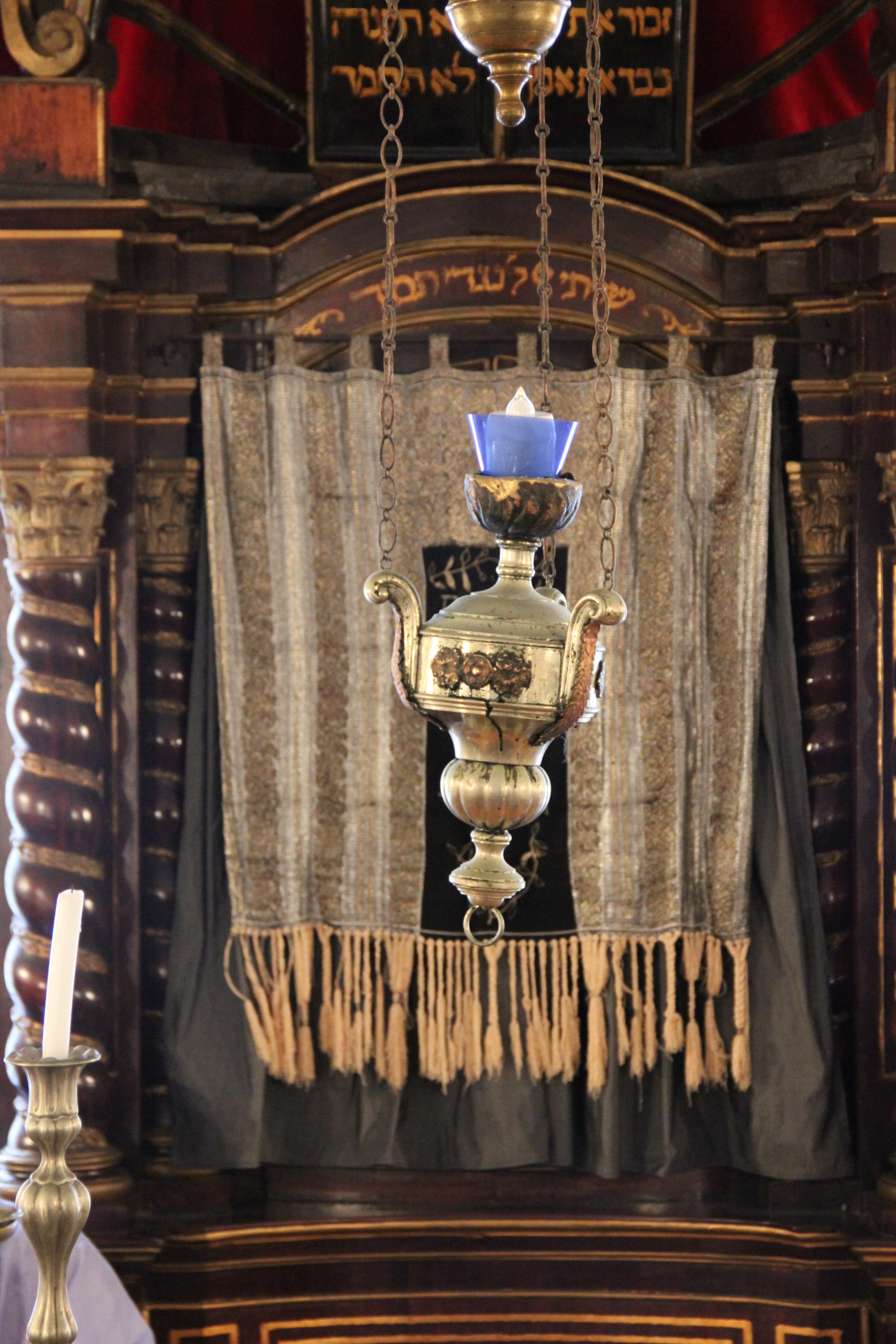
Interior of the synagogue

During World War II, Dubrovnik came under fascist rule: the city was occupied first by the Italian army, and then by the German army after 8 September 1943. Before the Holocaust, 250 Jews lived in Dubrovnik; many were transferred to the island of Lopud along with other Jews from different parts of Croatia, then in June 1943 they were transferred to the Rab concentration camp with most Jews from Italian-occupied lands. In October 1944 Josip Broz Tito's Partisans entered Dubrovnik, and many Jews were transferred by the Partisans to the freed territories; the rest were sent by the Germans to concentration camps. After the war, many of the surviving Dubrovnik Jews settled in Israel.

Whereas only 17 Dubrovnik Jews officially registered in the 2001 census, more recent heritage sources estimate that the local Jewish community today numbers approximately 20–30 residents, maintaining the historic Dubrovnik Synagogue and participating in religious life mainly on major holidays and special occasions. At the national level, the 2021 Croatian census recorded 410 persons identifying their ethnicity as Jewish.

== Sources ==
- Birnbaum, Marianna D. (2003). The Long Journey of Gracia Mendes. Central European University Press. ISBN 9789639241671.
- Gerber, Jane S. (2020). Cities of Splendour in the Shaping of Sephardi History. Liverpool University Press. p. 9781789624250.
- Ginio, Alisa Meyuhas (1992). Jews, Christians, and Muslims in the Mediterranean World After 1492. Taylor & Francis. ISBN 9780714680507.
- Goldish, Matt (2008). Jewish Questions Responsa on Sephardic Life in the Early Modern Period. Princeton University Press. ISBN 9780691122656.
- de Ridder-Symoens, Hilde (2013). Feingold, Mordechai (ed.). History of Universities, volume XXVII/1. OUP Oxford. ISBN 9780199685844.
- Furman, Daniel; Locker, Zvi (2007). Skolnik, Fred (ed.). Encyclopedia Judaica, volume 6. McMillan Reference USA. ISBN 9780028659343.
