= List of synagogues in Croatia =

This list of synagogues in Croatia contains active, otherwise used and destroyed synagogues in Croatia. The list of Croatia synagogues is not necessarily complete, as only a negligible number of sources testify to the existence of some synagogues.

Synagogues currently in active religious use

Location	Name	Built	Status	Remarks	Picture
Bjelovar	Bjelovar Old Synagogue	1882	?		
Bjelovar	Bjelovar Synagogue	1917	standing	No longer in service, currently servers as a home of culture in Bjelovar	
Đakovo	Đakovo Synagogue	1863–1880	Destroyed 1941	The building was set on fire.	
Čakovec	Čakovec Synagogue	1836	Destroyed 1944	The synagogue was demolished in May 1944 and a monument was erected to commemorate the place.	
Donji Miholjac	Donji Miholjac Synagogue	1913	Destroyed 1948	Abandoned in 1941, the building sold in 1948.	
Dubrovnik	Dubrovnik Synagogue	15th century	standing	Owned by the local Jewish community, the main floor still functions as a place of worship for Holy days and special occasions, but is now mainly a city museum which hosts numerous Jewish ritual items and centuries-old artifacts.	
Ilok	Ilok Synagogue	1855	destroyed 1949	The original synagogue was rebuilt after a fire in 1873. It was sold and demolished in 1949.	
Karlovac	Karlovac Synagogue	1870–1871	demolished 1960s	Demolished in the 1960s. There is a plaque monument to commemorate the place.	
Koprivnica	Koprivnica Synagogue	1875–1876	stand	The synagogue building has been preserved to this day, interior has been significantly altered due to significant alterations and changes in functions. Renovation since 2020.	
Križevci	Križevci Synagogue	1895	stand	The building has been preserved to this day, but its appearance has been completely altered by a number of renovations.	
Kutina	Kutina synagogue	Built 1913/1914	Demolished 1968		
Našice	Našice synagogue	1893–1898	Demolished 1942	The building was demolished.	
Osijek	Osijek Synagogue	1869	Destroyed 1950	It burned down in April 1941 and was completely demolished nine years later. The picture shown is an interior of the demolished synagogue in 1941.	
Osijek	Osijek Synagogue	1901–1903	stand	The building has lost its original function and is now owned by the Lutheran Pentecostal Church.	
Pakrac	Pakrac Synagogue	1875	Destroyed 1941	The building was destroyed.	
Podravka Slatina	Podravka Slatina Synagogue	1896	stand	The building is still standing, although it has been altered into different function during the Socialist Yugoslavia.	
Požega	Požega Synagogue	1885	Demolished 1941	The building was demolished.	
Rijeka	Rijeka Synagogue	1903	Demolished 1944	The Rijeka Synagogue was destroyed on January 25, 1944, during Nazi occupation of Rijeka.	
Rijeka	Rijeka Orthodox Synagogue	1931	Standing	Currently functioning as synagogues	
Sisak	Sisak Synagogue	1870–1880	Standing	Despite the fact that the synagogue was partially destroyed during World War II, it was transformed and transformed into a music school that still operates today.	
Slavonski Brod	Slavonski Brod Synagogue	1896	Destroyed 1944	The synagogue was reportedly destroyed in early 1945 by an Allied bombing.	
Split	Split Synagogue	16th century	stand	Owned by the local Jewish community.	
Varaždin	Varaždin Synagogue	1860–1862	stand	Damaged in 1941, during World War II. Confiscated in 1946, rebuilt for other functions. Renovated 2021.	
Vinkovci	Vinkovci Synagogue	1923	Destroyed 1941–1942	Vinkovci Synagogue was destroyed during World War II in 1941–1942 by the regime of the Independent State of Croatia.	
Virovitica	Virovitica Synagogue	1860–1863	Destroyed 1941	The synagogue was destroyed and looted in 1918 and completely demolished in 1941.	
Vukovar	Vukovar Synagogue	1889	Demolished 1958	Building looted during WW II; razed in 1958	
Zagreb	Zagreb Synagogue	1866–1867	Destroyed 1942	The synagogue was destroyed during World War II.	
Zagreb	Synagogue of the Jewish Community of Zagreb	1806	Standing	It was established in 1806 as Synagogue of Jewish Community Center and functions as a museum and Office of the Jewish Community of Zagreb.	

== Sources ==
- "Jewish Postcards | Europe - Synagogues and People | Croatia". judaica.cz.
