= History of the Jews in Croatia =

Croatian Jews - יהדות קרואטיה Židovi u Hrvatskoj
- The location of Croatia (dark green) in the European Union (light green)

Total population
- 509

Regions with significant populations

Languages
- Hebrew, Ladino, Croatian, and Yiddish

Religion
- Judaism

Related ethnic groups
- Ashkenazi Jews, Sephardi Jews

The history of the Jews in Croatia dates back to at least the 3rd century, although little is known of the community until the 10th and 15th centuries. According to the 1931 census, the community numbered 21,505 members, and it is estimated that on the eve of the Second World War the population was around 25,000 people. Most of the population was murdered during the Holocaust that took place on the territory of the Nazi puppet state called the Independent State of Croatia. After the war, half of the survivors chose to settle in Israel, while an estimated 2,500 members continued to live in Croatia. According to the 2011 census, there were 509 Jews living in Croatia, but that number is believed to exclude those born of mixed marriages or those married to non-Jews. More than 80 percent of the Zagreb Jewish Community were thought to fall in those two categories.

Today, Croatia is home to eight synagogues and associated organizations, located in Zagreb, Rijeka, Osijek, Split, Dubrovnik, Čakovec, Daruvar, Slavonski Brod. Of these, the Zagreb community is the largest and most active, organizing events such as the annual Zagreb Jewish Film Festival to promote Jewish culture and identity.

== History of the community ==
=== Ancient community ===
Jewish traders and merchants first arrived in what is now northern Croatia in the first centuries of the Common Era, when Roman law allowed free movement throughout the Empire. A coin from the Bar Kokhba revolt in Judaea (132–136 CE) was discovered in Zadar, though it remains unclear whether it was brought there by a Jewish refugee, an enslaved captive, or a Roman soldier who had fought in the war. There is also an ancient inscription from Senj that mentions "Aurelius Dionisius, a Jew from Tiberias." Archaeological excavations in Osijek reveal a synagogue dating to the 3rd century AD, and an excavation in Solin discovered Jewish graves from the same period. A Jewish community in Split was found to have also emerged in the 3rd century.

In the 7th century Jews sought refuge in Diocletian's Palace after the Dalmatian capital Salona was overrun by the Avars. A synagogue was built into the western wall of the palace in the 16th century, and descendants of the Salona refugees are still living in the area.

=== Early Middle Ages ===
One of the oldest written sources, which could indicate the presence of Jews on Croatian territory, comes from the letter of the vizier Hasdai ibn Shaprut, which was sent to King Joseph of the Khazars. This letter from the 10th century refers to the "King of the Gebalim - Slavs", see the article Miholjanec, whose country borders the country of the Hungarians. The King sent a delegation, which included "Mar (Aramaic:"Lord") Shaul and Mar Joseph", to the Caliph Abd-ar-Rahman III of Córdoba. Delegates reported that mar Hisdai Amram came to the Khazar king's palace from the country where the "Gebalim" lived. In Hebrew "gebal" means "mountain". Hungarian sources reported, that a vineyard near Miholjanec was named "master of the mountain". Croatia is also represented as a country of "Gebalim" in a letter of Bishop Gauderich addressed to Anastasius as a co-author of the legend of Cherson in the 9th century.

=== Late Middle Ages ===
The Jewish communities of Croatia flourished in the 13th and 14th centuries, with the communities enjoying prosperity and peaceful relations with their Croatian neighbors.

This ended in 1456, when Jews, along with most non-Catholic Croats, were forced out. There followed 200 years where there are no records of Jews in Croatia. In those 200 years Jews from Croatia were usually on diplomatic missions to Bosnia on behalf of the Republic of Venice.

==== Arrival of the Spanish Refugees ====
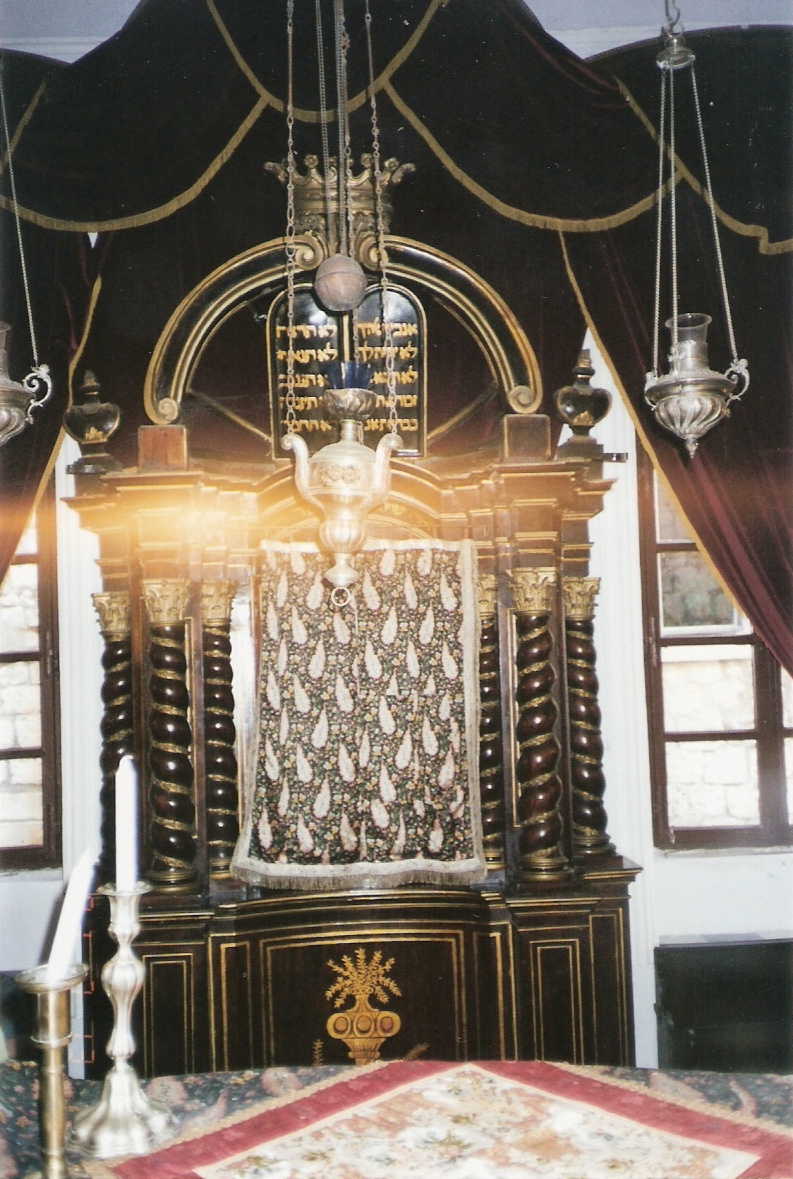
The Synagogue in Dubrovnik is the second oldest synagogue in Europe. It is built in the Sephardic style.

Percentage of Jewish population in the Banovina of Croatia prior to World War II in Yugoslavia, according to the 1931 census

The 15th century saw increasing persecution of Jews in areas of Spain retaken in the Reconquista. From 1492 onward, Jewish refugees fleeing the Spanish and Portuguese Inquisitions arrived in Ottoman territories, including the Balkan provinces of Macedonia and Bosnia. Some of these refugees found their way to Croatia, in particular to Split and Dubrovnik, on the Dalmatian coast.

In 1622, a blood libel case emerged in Dubrovnik (then Ragusa), when a Christian girl was found murdered in the home of a woman who was deemed mentally unstable. The woman claimed that Isaac Jeshurun, a Sephardic Jew, had persuaded her to commit the murder for ritual purposes. Jeshurun was initially given a severe sentence, but after three years, his sentence was commuted, an outcome viewed as miraculous by the Jewish community.

=== Habsburg rule ===
In the 17th century, Jews were still not permitted to settle in northern Croatia. Jews traveled to Croatia as traveling merchants, mostly from neighboring Hungary. They were generally permitted to stay only a few days. In the early part of the century, the Croatian Parliament ("Sabor") confirmed its ban on permanent settlement when a Jewish family attempted to settle in Đurđevac.

In 1753, although still officially banned, Jews were allowed to settle in Bjelovar, Koprivnica and Varaždin, by General Beck, the military commander of the Varaždin region. In order to streamline the treatment of Jews in Croatia, Count Franjo Patačić, by order of the Royal Office in Varaždin, wrote a comprehensive report advocating Jewish permanent residence in Croatia on the basis that "most of them are merchants, and trade makes towns flourish".

The prohibition against Jewish settlement in northern Croatia lasted until 1783, until the 1782 Edict of Tolerance issued by the Habsburg Monarch Emperor Joseph II went into effect. Jews were subsequently allowed to settle in Croatia, but were not allowed to own land or engage in any trade protected by a guild, and were not allowed to work in agriculture. Despite these measures, Jews settled in Zagreb and Varaždin.

In 1840, the Sabor (parliament) voted to "gradually" allow full equality for the Jews, and over the next 33 years there was gradual progress.

Year	Legislation
1843	Range of occupations open to Jews extended
1846	Possibility to buy freedom through payment of a "tolerance tax"
1859	Jews allowed to buy houses and land
1873	Full legal equality

In 1867 the new Zagreb Great Synagogue was inaugurated and Rabbi Dr. Hosea Jacobi became Chief Rabbi of Zagreb. In 1873, Ivan Mažuranić signed the decree allowing for the full legal equality of Jews and, as with other faiths, state funds were made available for community institutions.

By 1880, there were 13,488 Jews in Croatia, rising to 20,032 by 1900. At the beginning of the 20th century, there were 21 Jewish communities in Croatia, the largest being in Zagreb (3,000 people) and Osijek (3,000 people). The Jewish community of Croatia became highly successful and integrated. By 1900, 54% of Zagreb Jews and 35% of all Croatian Jews spoke Croatian as their mother tongue. Despite their small numbers, Jews were disproportionately represented in industrial and wholesale business in Croatia, and in the timber and food industries. Several Jewish families were amongst Croatia's wealthiest families. Despite the apparent wealth, most Jews were middle class, and many second generation Croatian Jews were attracted to the fields of law and medicine.

=== World War I ===
World War I brought about the collapse of the Austro-Hungarian Empire, and upheaval for the Jewish communities of the region. After the war, Croatia joined with Slovenia, Serbia which included Vardar Macedonia and Montenegro, and Bosnia and Herzegovina to form the Kingdom of Yugoslavia.

Prior to World War II, the Croatian, and especially the Zagreb Jewish community, was the preeminent community of Yugoslavia. In 1940 there were about 11,000 Jews living in Zagreb: about 76% were Ashkenazi Jews, 5% Sephardi Jews, 17% unaffiliated and the remainder being religious.

=== The Holocaust ===
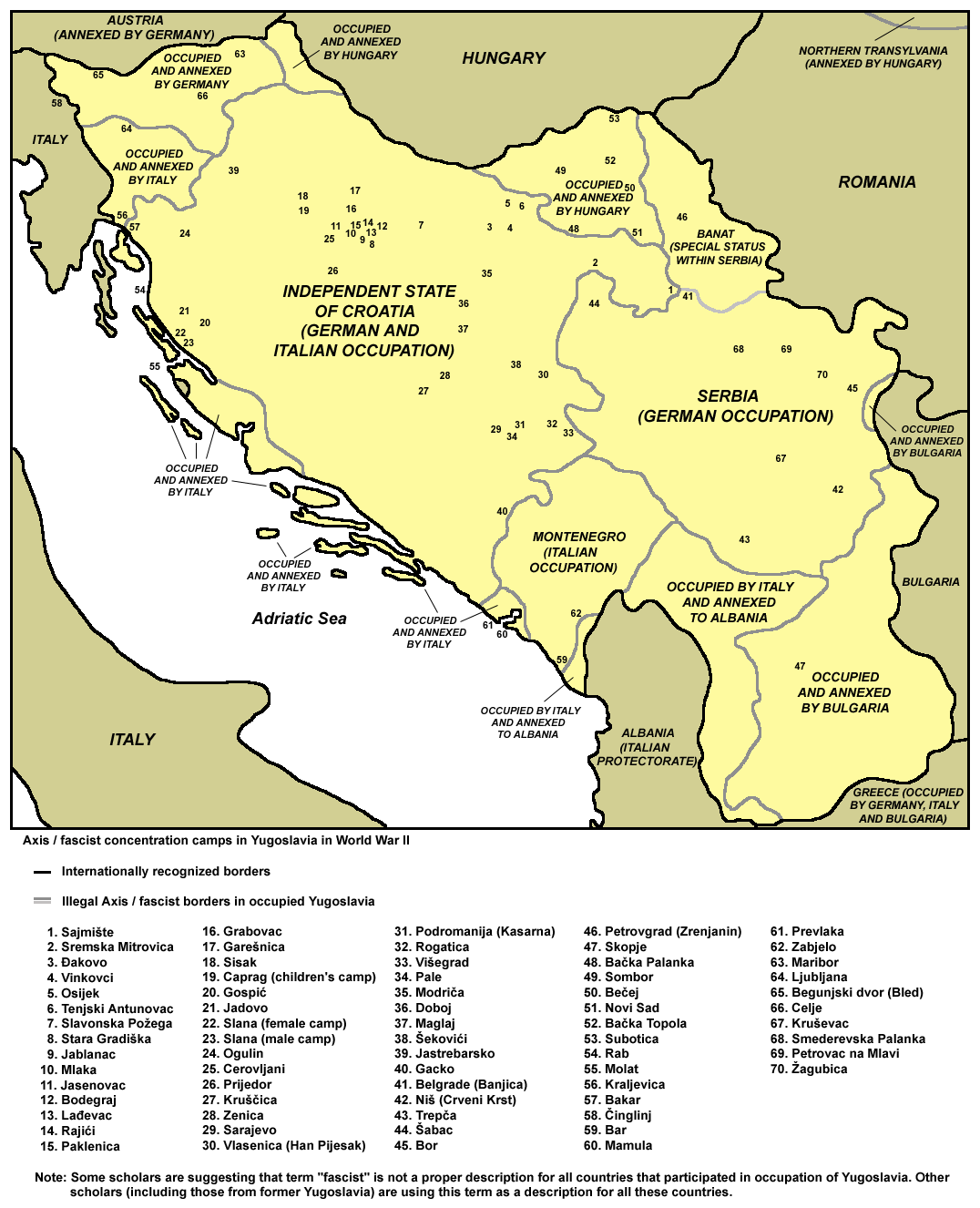
Concentration camps in Yugoslavia during World War II.

On 25 March 1941, Prince Paul of Yugoslavia, an ethnic Serb, signed Yugoslavia's alliance with the Axis powers under the Tripartite Pact. The decision was unpopular in many parts of the country, and massive demonstrations took place in the Yugoslav capital, Belgrade. Prince Paul was overthrown, and a new government under Peter II and Dušan Simović, also ethnic Serbs, took power. The new government withdrew its support for the Axis but did not repudiate the Tripartite Pact. Nevertheless, Axis forces, led by Nazi Germany, invaded Yugoslavia on 6 April 1941.

With Germany and Italy's support, the Croatian ultra-nationalist Ustaše movement came to power in the newly established puppet state called the Independent State of Croatia (NDH). The Ustaše were notoriously antisemitic, and wasted little time in instituting anti-Jewish legislation and persecuting the Jews under their control. Like Nazis forced Jews to wear armbands with a yellow Star of David, the Croatian Ustaše regime forced Jews to wear armbands with the letter "Ž" for "Židov", the word for "Jew" in Croatian. NDH Interior Minister Andrija Artuković said in 1941 upon the proclamation of ethnic laws: "The Government of NDH shall solve the Jewish question in the same way as the German Government did". Already in April 1941, the Ustaše and Volksdeutsche burned the synagogue and destroyed the Jewish cemetery in Osijek, while the Ustaše mayor of Zagreb, Ivan Werner, ordered the destruction of the main Zagreb synagogue, which was completely razed in 1942 The Ustaše set up a number of concentration camps with the most notorious being Jasenovac in which 20,000 Jews were murdered.

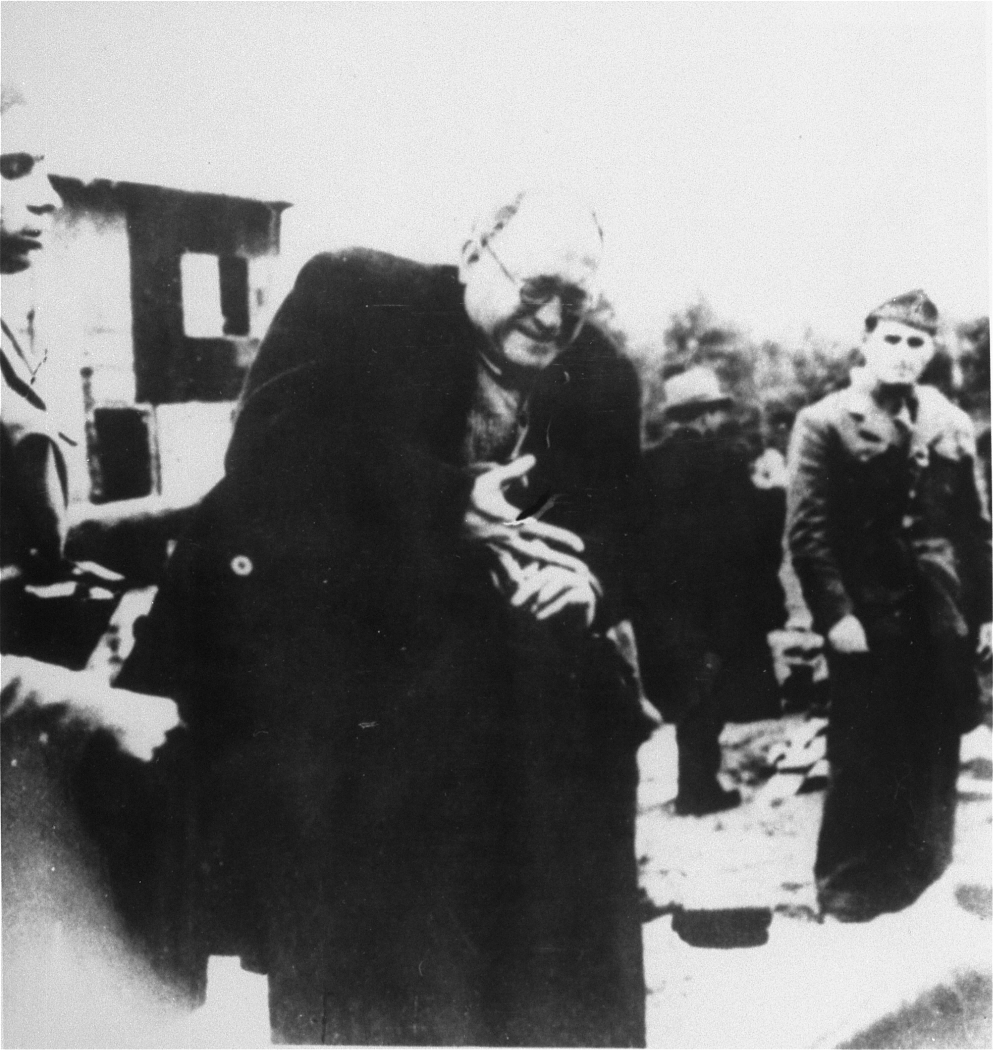
Teodor Grunfeld, known Croatian Jewish industrialist, being forced to remove his ring upon arrival at the Jasenovac concentration camp.

During the Holocaust, a total of 29–31,000 Jews in the NDH were killed, around 75% by the Ustaše and around 25% by the Germans. This constituted 79 percent of the country's pre-war Jewish population, including 20,000 of the 23,000-25,000 Croatian Jews. Only 5,000 Croatian Jews survived the war, most as soldiers in Josip Broz Tito's National Liberation Army or as exiles in the Italian-occupied zone. After Italy capitulated to the Allied Powers, the surviving Jews lived in free Partisan territory.

When Yugoslavia was liberated in 1945, Croatia became part of the new Yugoslav federation, which eventually became the Socialist Federal Republic of Yugoslavia.

=== Post-war community ===
After 1945, atheism became the official policy of Yugoslavia and Croatia, and because of this there were no rabbis in Croatia until the mid-1990s. Most Croatian Jews identified as Yugoslavs, or as Serbs or Croats. After the founding of Israel, about half of the survivors renounced their Yugoslav citizenship as a prerequisite for leaving the country and acquiring Israeli citizenship. Those who opted to leave for Israel signed a document by which they left all property, land, and other unmovable property to Yugoslavia.

The post-war Jewish community of Croatia became highly assimilated, with 80% of Zagreb's 1,500 Jews either born into mixed marriages, or married to non-Jews. In 1991, there were approximately 2,000 Jews in Croatia.

== Twenty-first century ==
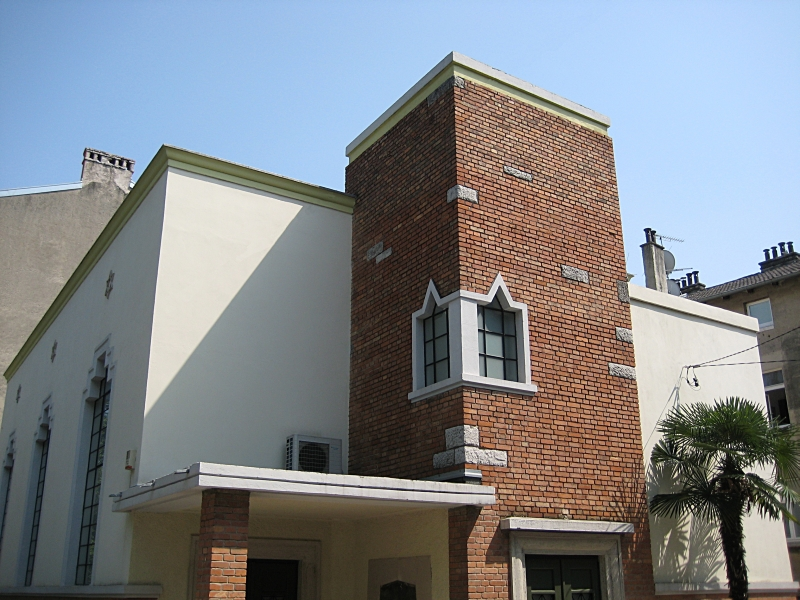
A synagogue in the town of Rijeka

The 2001 Croatian census listed only 495 Jews, with 323 in Zagreb. Approximately 20 Jews lived in each of Primorje-Gorski Kotar County, Osijek and Dubrovnik.

The Jewish community in Croatia is organized into ten Jewish "municipalities" (Croatian: Židovska općina) in the cities of Čakovec, Daruvar, Dubrovnik, Koprivnica, Osijek, Rijeka, Slavonski Brod, Split, Virovitica, Zagreb. Since 2005, Zagreb also has a separate Jewish organization named "Bet Israel", formed by a splinter group in the original organization led by Ivo Goldstein and others. A Chabad organization is also registered in Zagreb and held most Jewish activities around the year.

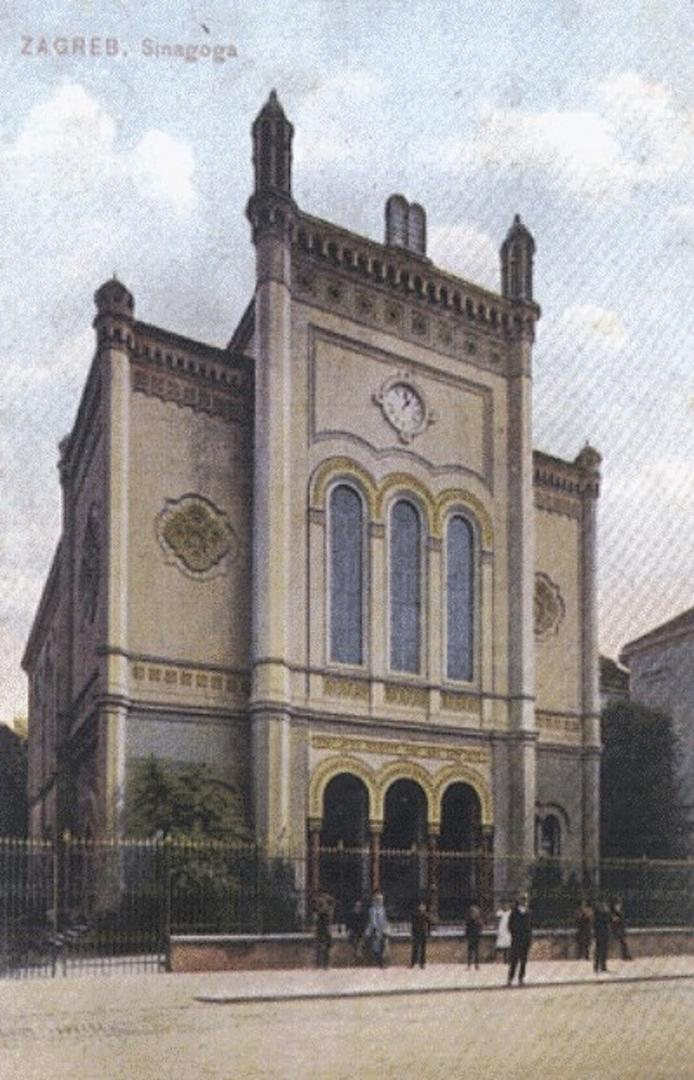
Zagreb synagogue

Jews are officially recognized as an autonomous national minority, and as such, they elect a special representative to the Croatian Parliament, shared with members of eleven other national minorities.

== Regional communities ==
=== Dalmatia ===
The Jewish communities of the Croatian coast of Dalmatia date back to the 14th century CE. A letter from 1326 refers to a Jewish doctor in Dubrovnik. The community remained small throughout the years (100-330 members), although the community distinguished itself in trade and medicine. The community was augmented from 1421 by refugees fleeing increasing persecution in Spain, and then from 1492 as Jews fled the Spanish and Portuguese Inquisitions.

The Jewish synagogue in Split is more than 500 years old and is the third oldest active synagogue in Europe. Except for a brief period during WW2 the synagogue has been in continuous use since it was established. Although there is no rabbi in Split, the 100-member strong community conducts regular Friday evening Shabbat services (the Jewish sabbath) and a kosher meal is prepared and served to all who come. The synagogue is open every day from 9 am until around 2 pm for tours. Although the interior of the synagogue was restored in 1996 the interior is from the 18th and 19th Centuries.

Antisemitism, based on the attitudes of the Catholic Church and on Venetian law (which applied at the time), was a constant issue for the community, which lived in ghettos in Dubrovnik and Split. When Dalmatia was occupied by Napoleonic forces, the Jews attained legal equality for the first time. In 1814, when the Austrian Empire annexed Dalmatia, legal equality was again withdrawn. Jews were granted legal equality under Croatian law in the mid 19th century.

== See also ==
- List of synagogues in Croatia
- Concentration camps in the Independent State of Croatia
- Croatia-Israel relations
- List of Croatian Righteous Among the Nations
- The Holocaust in the Independent State of Croatia
- History of the Jews in Yugoslavia
