= El Soplón =

Painting by El Greco

- Artist: El Greco
- Year: 1571-1572
- Medium: oil on canvas
- Dimensions: 60.5 cm × 50.5 cm (23.8 in × 19.9 in)
- Location: Museo di Capodimonte, Naples

El Soplón or Boy Blowing on an Ember is a 1571-1572 oil on canvas painting by El Greco, almost certainly produced during his stay in Venice. The work could emulate the ancient Greek artist Antiphilus, inspired by a passage in Pliny the Elder's Naturalis historia. The painting is part of El Greco's rare Italian phase. It and Portrait of Giulio Clovio are among the first of his paintings of figures. He later re-used the figure for The Fable (1580).

The nocturnal scene features a boy holding a flaming ember in his left hand and a candle in his right hand.

It may have been a direct commission from the Farnese family, though its origins are not known for sure. It is traditionally thought to have been influenced by Jacopo Bassano, though recent studies have shown that it was instead an attempt to reconstruct a lost ancient Roman painting. Pliny the Elder's Historia Naturalis named several artists who depicted the same theme. It formed part of the Farnese Collection. The painting was inherited by Charles of Bourbon in 1734 and moved to Naples. It is now in the Museo di Capodimonte in Naples.

== See also ==
- List of works by El Greco

== Bibliography ==
- (in Italian) J. Álvarez Lopera, El Greco, Madrid, Arlanza (2005), Biblioteca «Descubrir el Arte», (colección «Grandes maestros»). ISBN 84-95503-44-1
- (in Italian) M. Scholz-Hanzsel, El Greco, Colonia, Taschen (2003). ISBN 978-3-8228-3173-1
