= Museo di Capodimonte =

Art museum and historic site in Naples, Italy

National Museum of Capodimonte
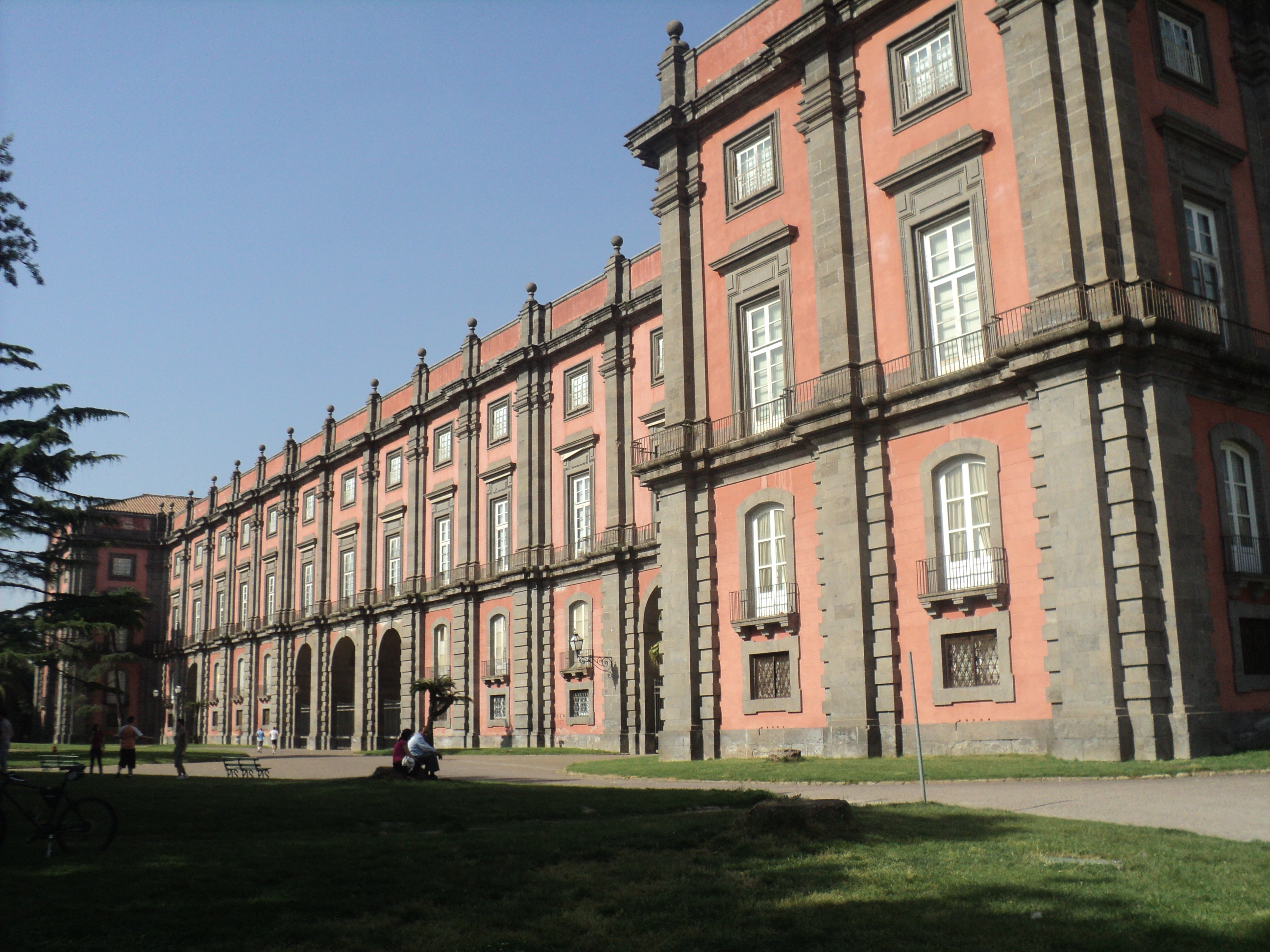
- Palace of Capodimonte
- Established: 1757
- Location: Via Miano, 2; 80131 Naples, Italy
- Coordinates: 40.86700°N 14.250555°E
- Type: Art museum, Historic site
- Visitors: 193 055(2016)
- Website: www.museocapodimonte.beniculturali.it

The Museo di Capodimonte or National Museum of Capodimonte is an art museum occupying the Palace of Capodimonte, a grand 18th-century Bourbon palazzo in Naples, Italy. The museum is the prime repository of Neapolitan painting and decorative art, with several important works from other Italian schools of painting, and some important ancient Roman sculptures. It is one of the largest museums in Italy. Though built on the royal collections of the Farnese family of Parma and the Kingdom of Naples, in its current form the museum was inaugurated in 1957.

== History ==
The museum building traces its origins back to 1738, when King Charles VII of Naples and Sicily (later Charles III of Spain) decided to build a hunting lodge on the Capodimonte hill, but then decided that he would instead build a grand palace, partly because his existing residence in the centre of the city, the Palace of Portici, was too small to accommodate his court, and partly because he needed somewhere to house the fabulous Farnese Collection which he had inherited from his mother, Elisabetta Farnese, last descendant of the sovereign ducal family of Parma.

Over the years, the palace was enlarged and filled with more art. In 1787, on the advice of Jacob Philipp Hackert, a laboratory for the restoration of paintings was created.

When the Parthenopaean Republic was declared in 1799, King Ferdinand IV fled to Palermo on board Nelson's Vanguard, taking the most valuable items from the museum with him. What remained was looted by the French troops of General Jean Étienne Championnet who were billeted there during the short life of the Republic in 1799. Later on, during the nine years of French reoccupation (1806 to 1815), the art collection was transferred to the Naples National Archaeological Museum. When King Ferdinand returned from Sicily in 1815, he employed many painters and sculptors to work on the redecoration of the palace. It was finally completed in 1840, and a gallery housing contemporary art was added.

After the palace passed in 1861 to the House of Savoy, further pieces were added to the art collections, appointing Domenico Morelli as consultant for new acquisitions. They also added an extensive collection of historic firearms and other weapons. In 1866, the boudoir of Maria Amalia of Saxony was transferred to Capodimonte from the Palace of Portici, and in 1877 a Roman era marble floor was brought in from a Roman villa on Capri.

After the end of the monarchy, the palace became purely a national museum in 1950, with many of the exhibits being returned from the National Museum.

== Collection ==
The first and second floors house the Galleria Nazionale (National Gallery), with paintings from the 13th to the 18th centuries including major works by Caravaggio, Raphael, Titian, El Greco, Giovanni Bellini, Simone Martini, Masaccio, Lorenzo Lotto, Giorgio Vasari, Jacob Philipp Hackert and many others. The museum is by far the best place to see paintings of the Neapolitan School, often under-appreciated by the wider world, with large holdings of Jusepe de Ribera, Luca Giordano, the Neapolitan Caravaggisti and many others (see List of works in the Galleria Nazionale di Capodimonte). Much of the ground floor is taken up by part of the magnificent Farnese collection of classical, mostly Roman, monumental sculpture, which survives here and in the Naples National Archaeological Museum largely intact.

Elsewhere in the palace, the royal apartments are furnished with antique 18th-century furniture and a collection of porcelain and majolica from the various royal residences

In 2022, the art dealer Lia Rumma donated more than 70 works made by 30 prominent Italian artists – including Vincenzo Agnetti, Giovanni Anselmo, Enrico Castellani, Luciano Fabro, and Michelangelo Pistoletto, and others – to the Italian government, to be displayed in the Museo di Capodimonte.

== Collection highlights ==
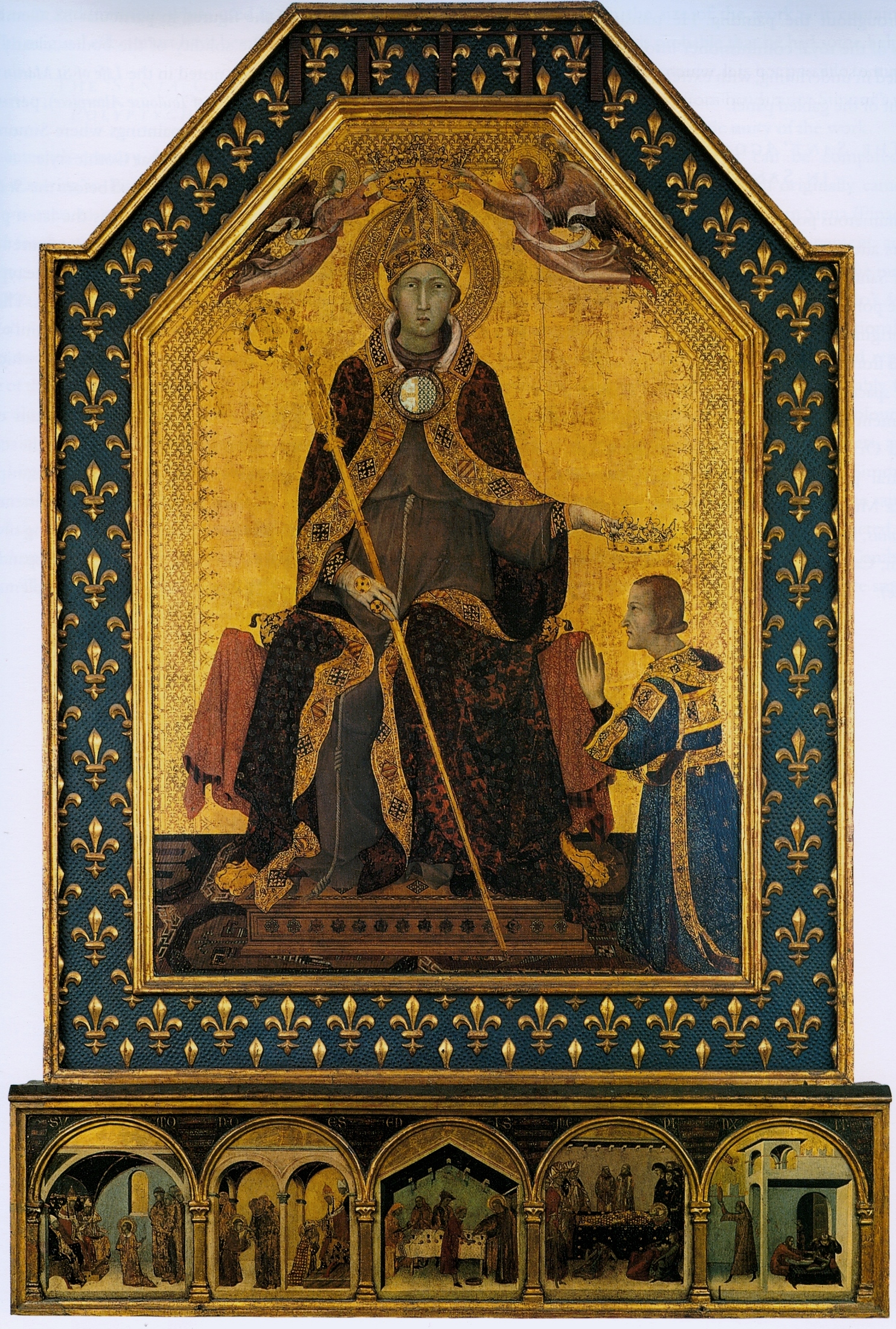
Toulouse Altarpiece by Simone Martini, c. 1317

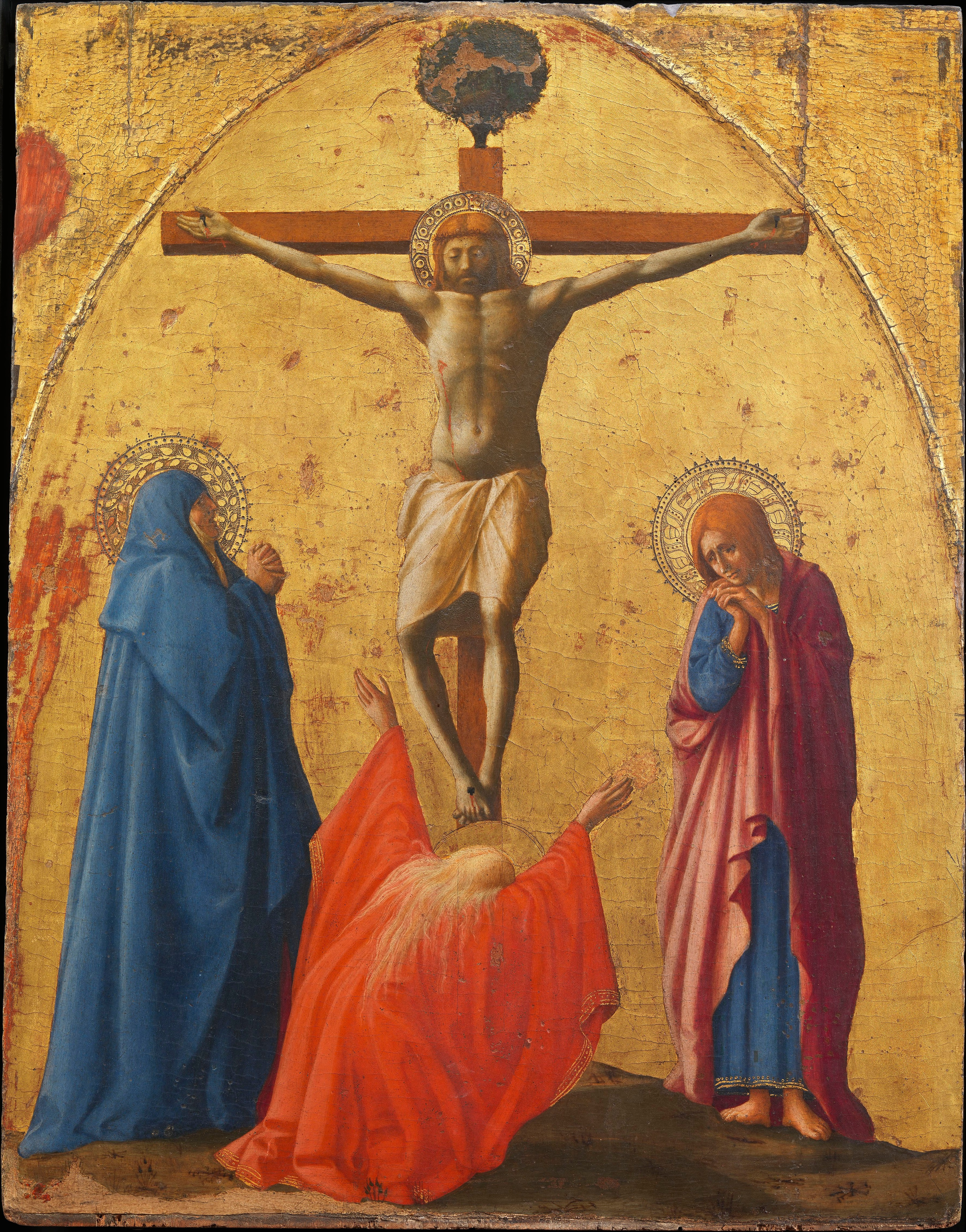
Crucifixion by Masaccio, c. 1426

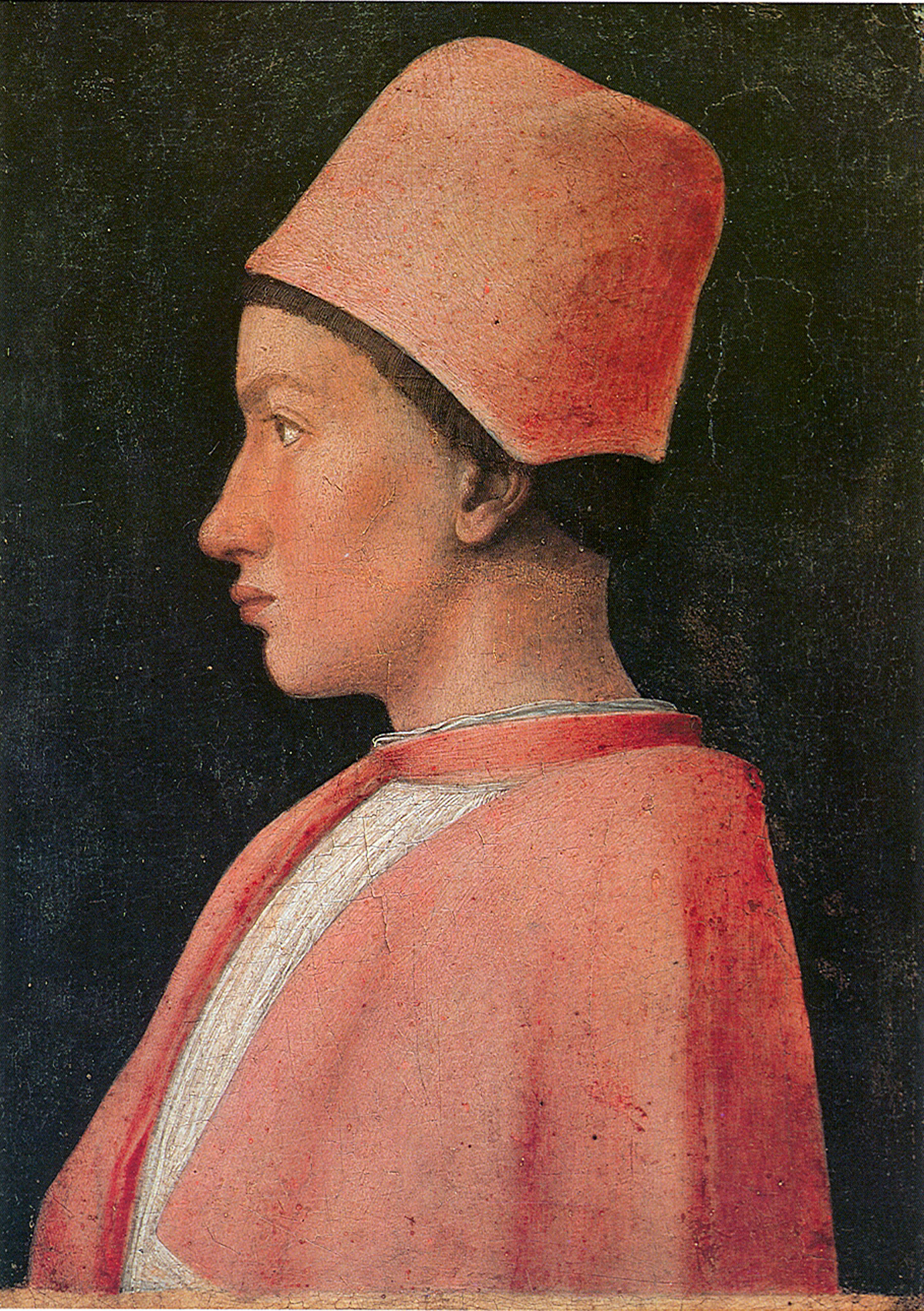
Portrait of Francesco Gonzaga by Andrea Mantegna, c. 1461

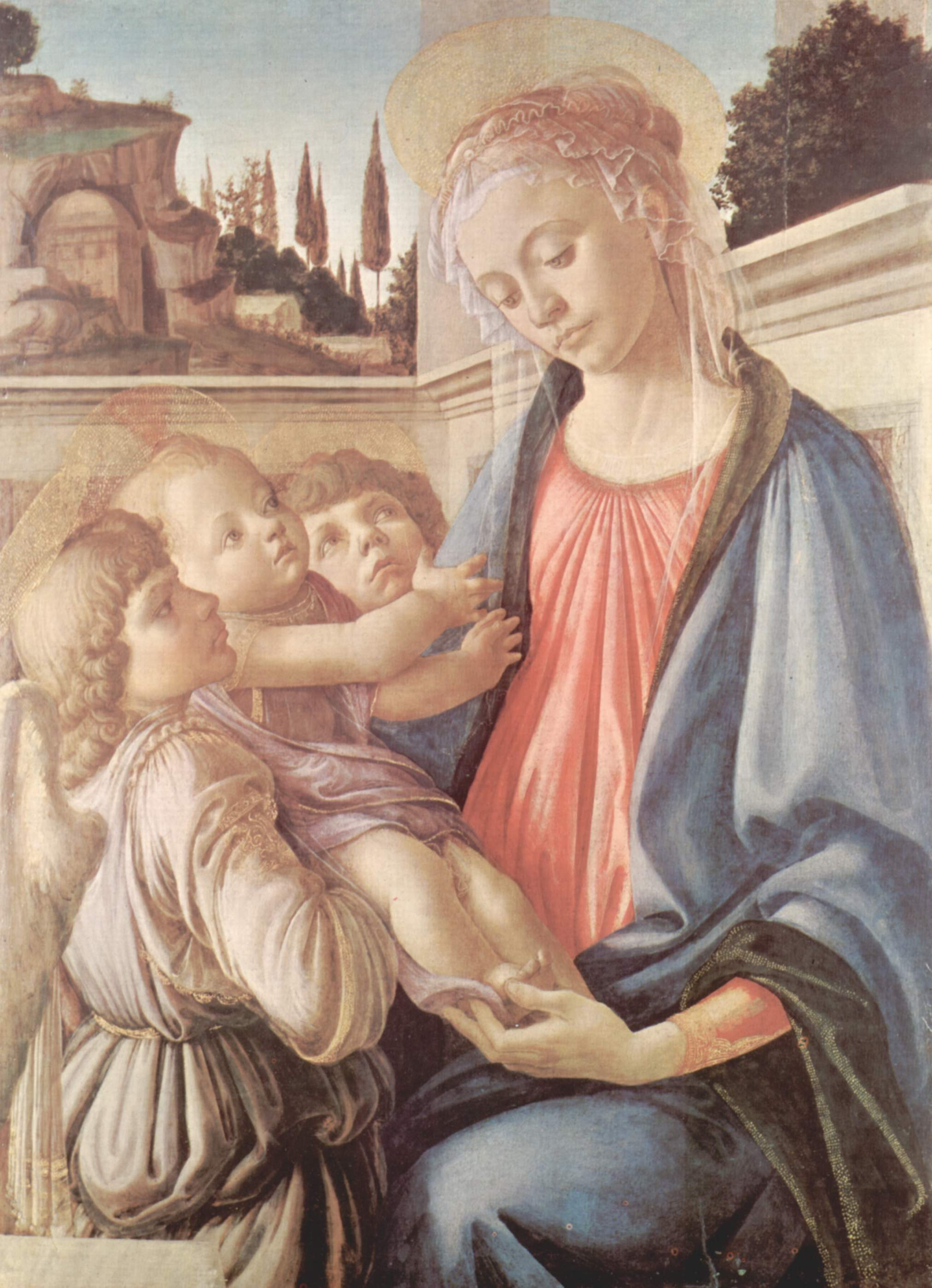
Madonna and Child and Two Angels by Botticelli, c. 1470

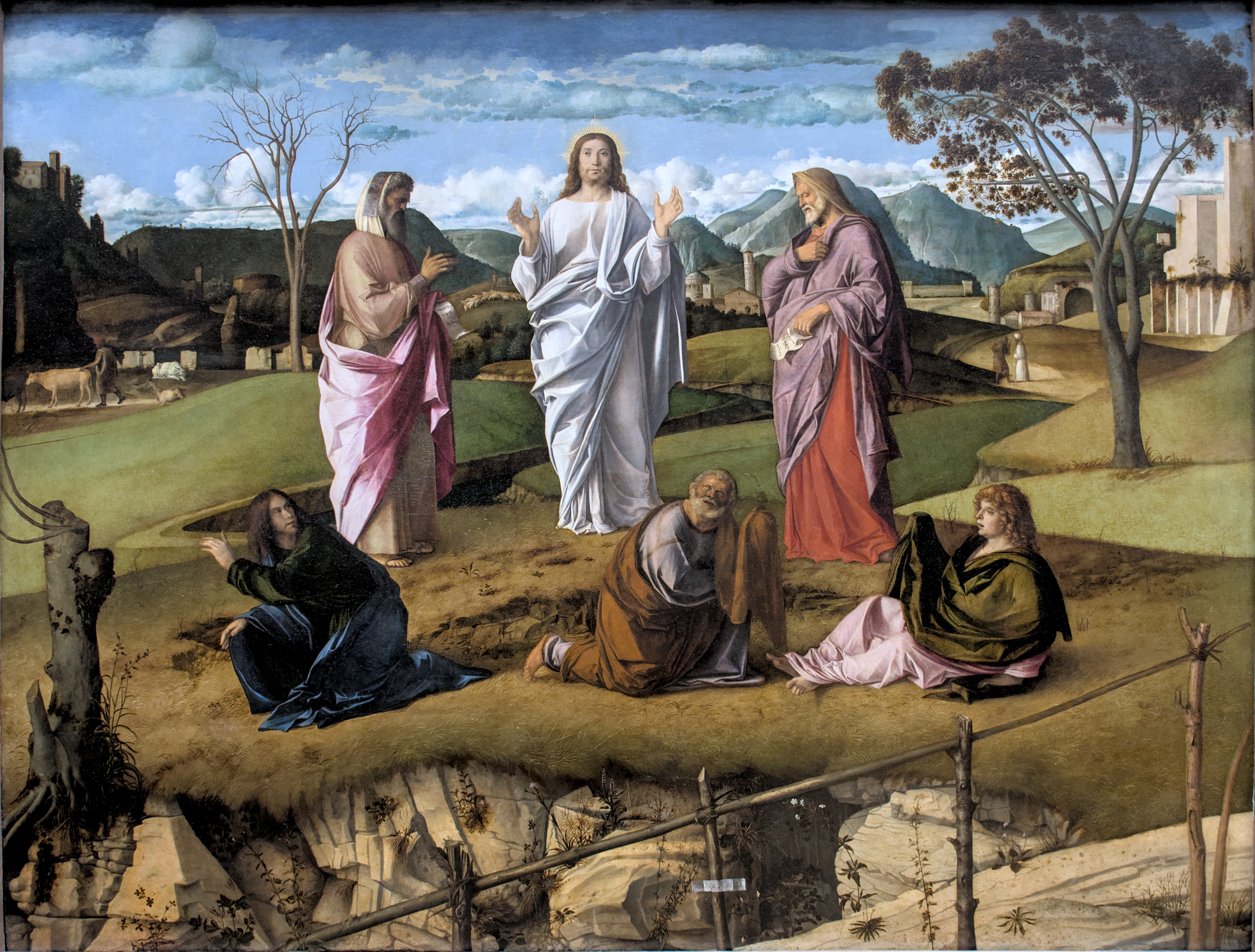
Transfiguration by Giovanni Bellini, c. 1480

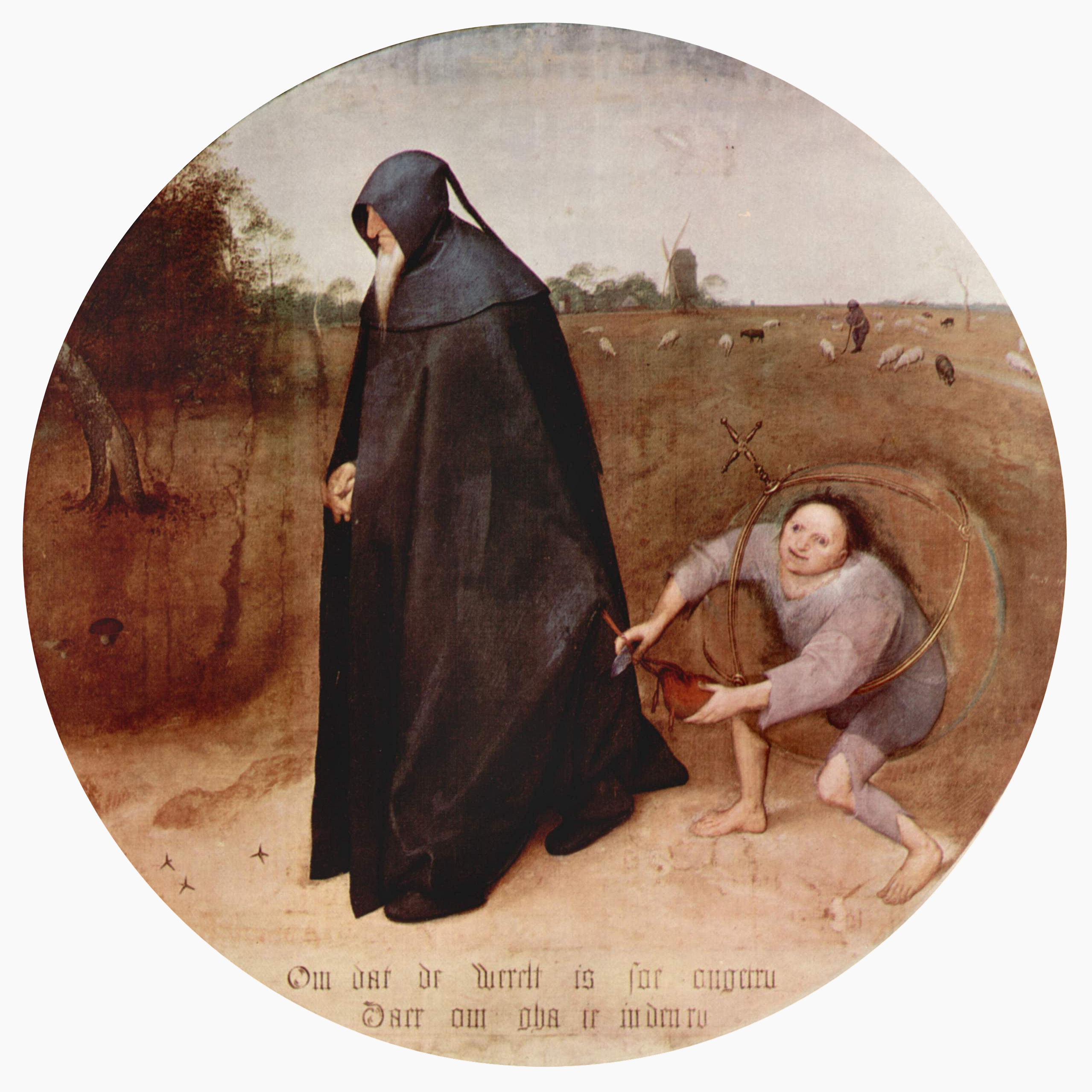
The Misanthrope by Pieter Bruegel the Elder, c. 1568

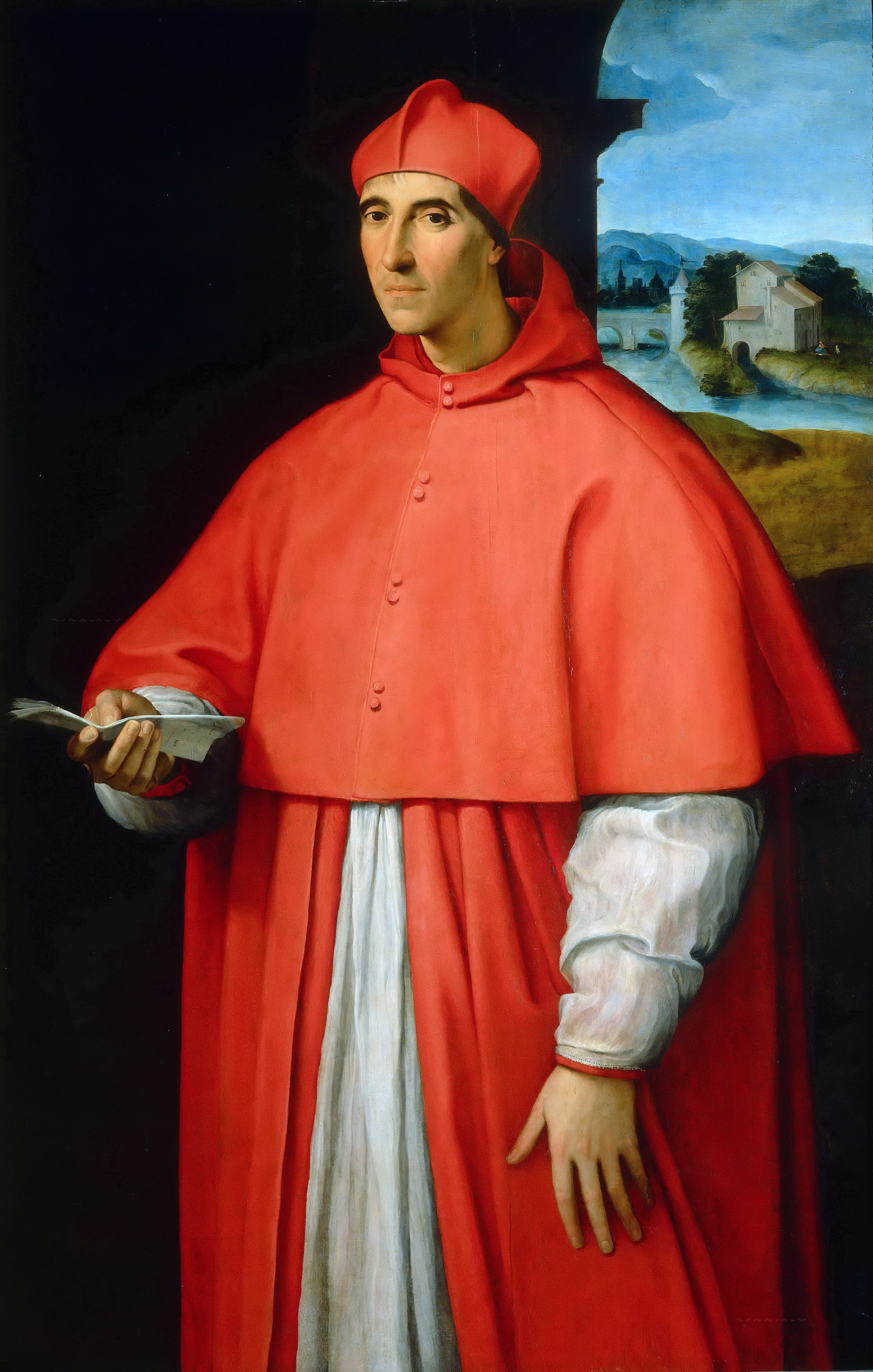
Portrait of Cardinal Alessandro Farnese by Raphael, c. 1509–1511

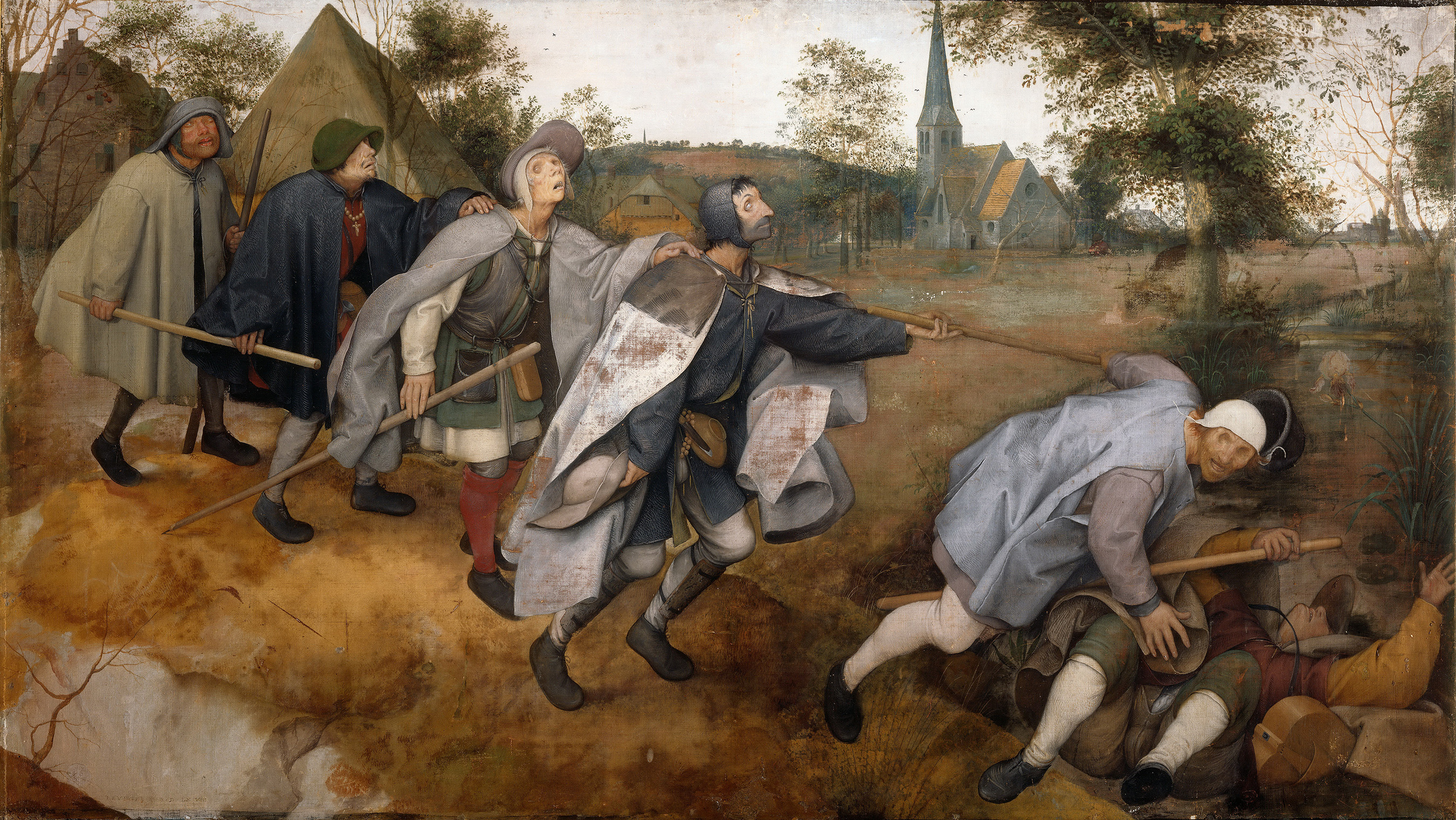
The Parable of the Blind Leading the Blind by Pieter Bruegel the Elder, c. 1568

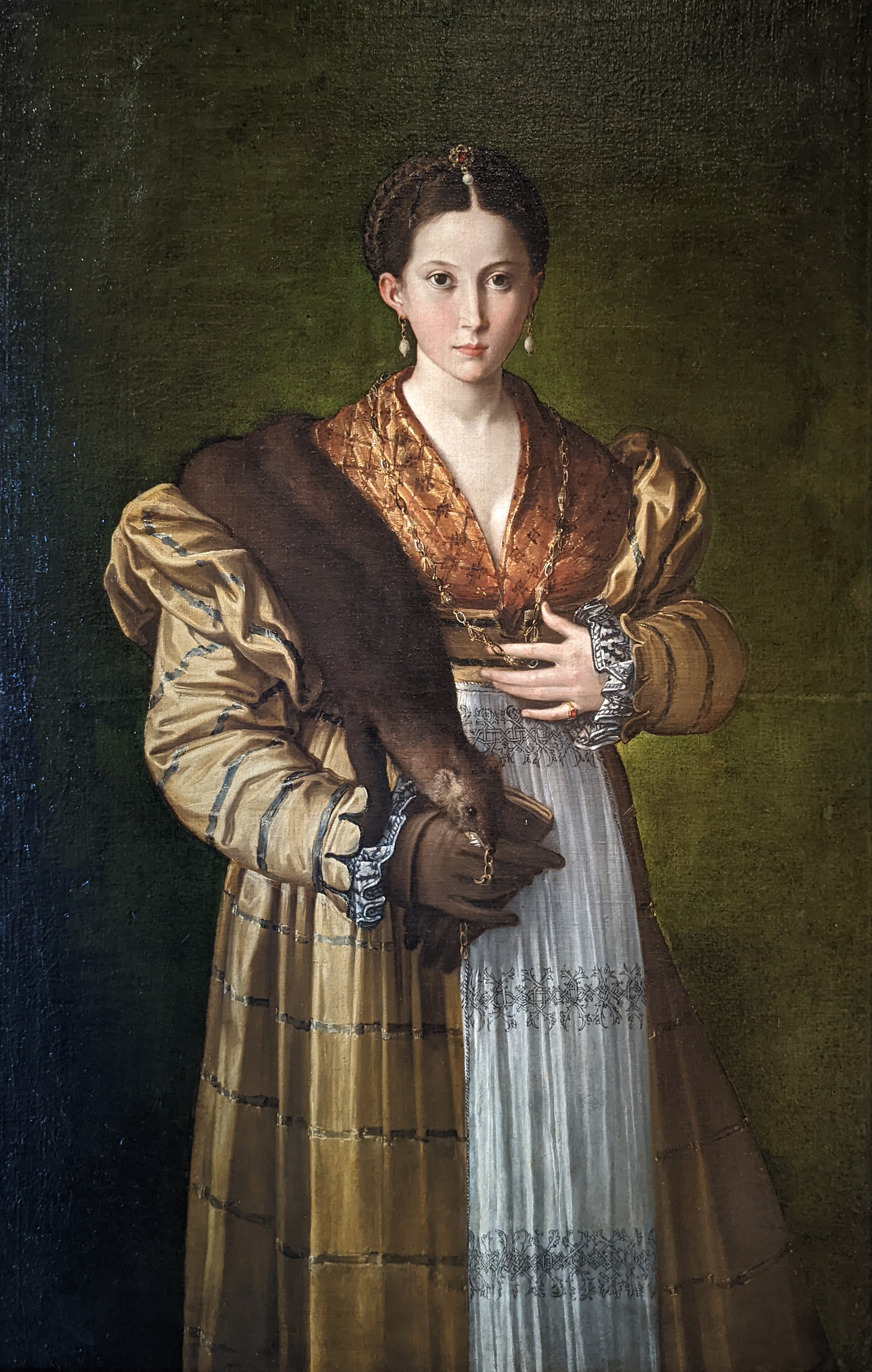
Antea by Parmigianino, c. 1524–1527

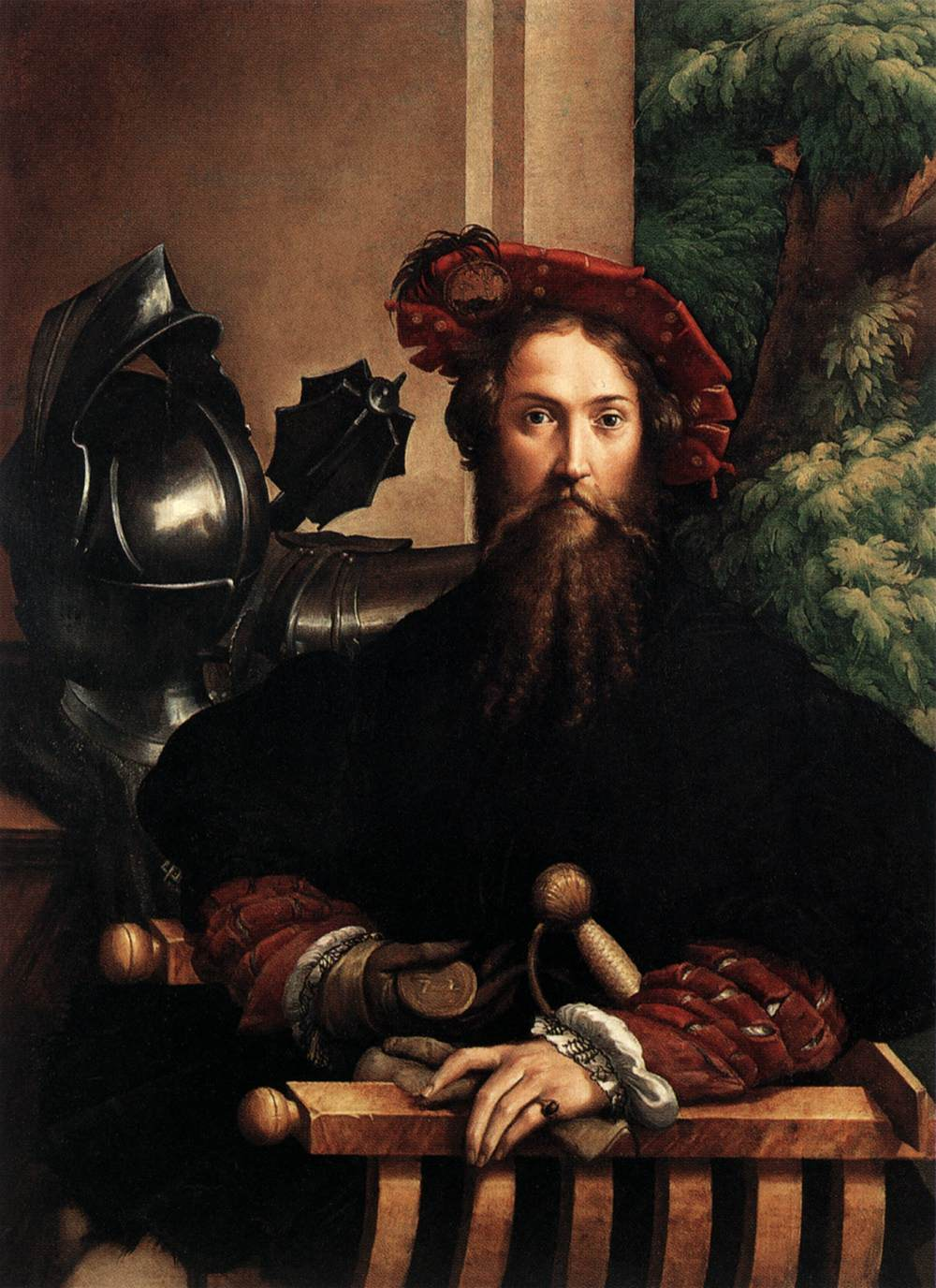
Portrait of Galeazzo Sanvitale by Parmigianino, c. 1524

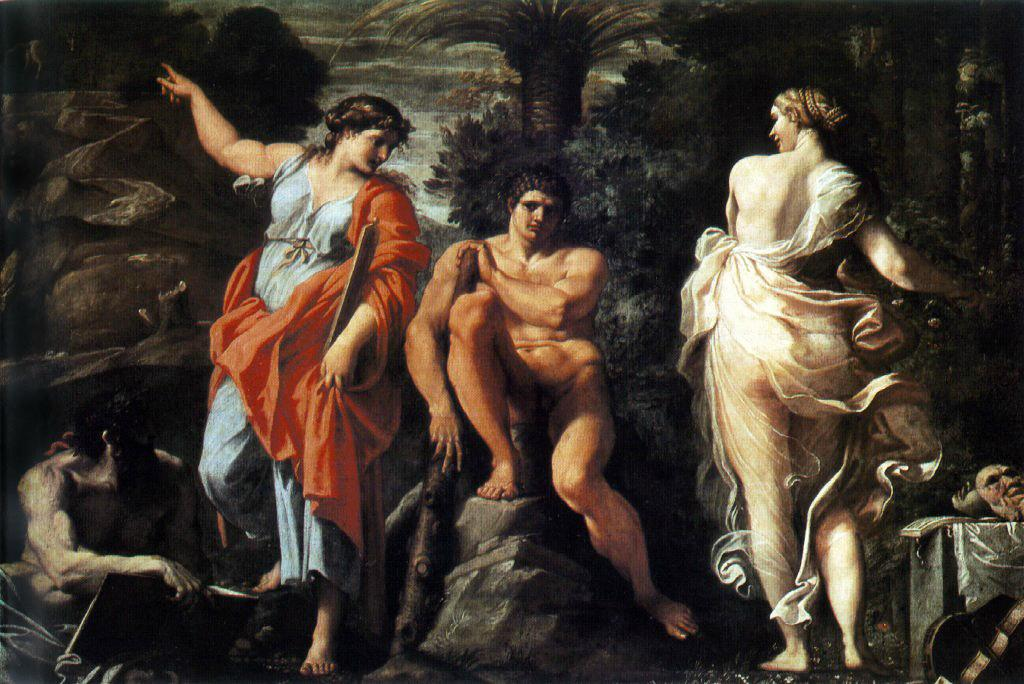
The Choice of Hercules by Annibale Carracci, c. 1596

Pope Paul III and his Grandsons by Titian, c. 1546

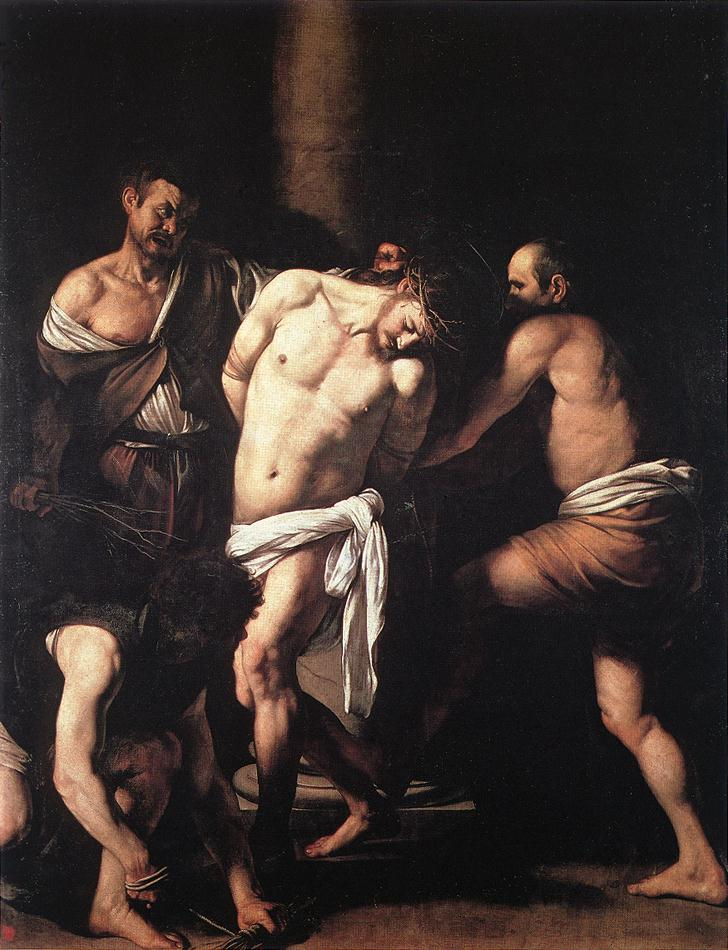
The Flagellation by Caravaggio, c. 1607–1608

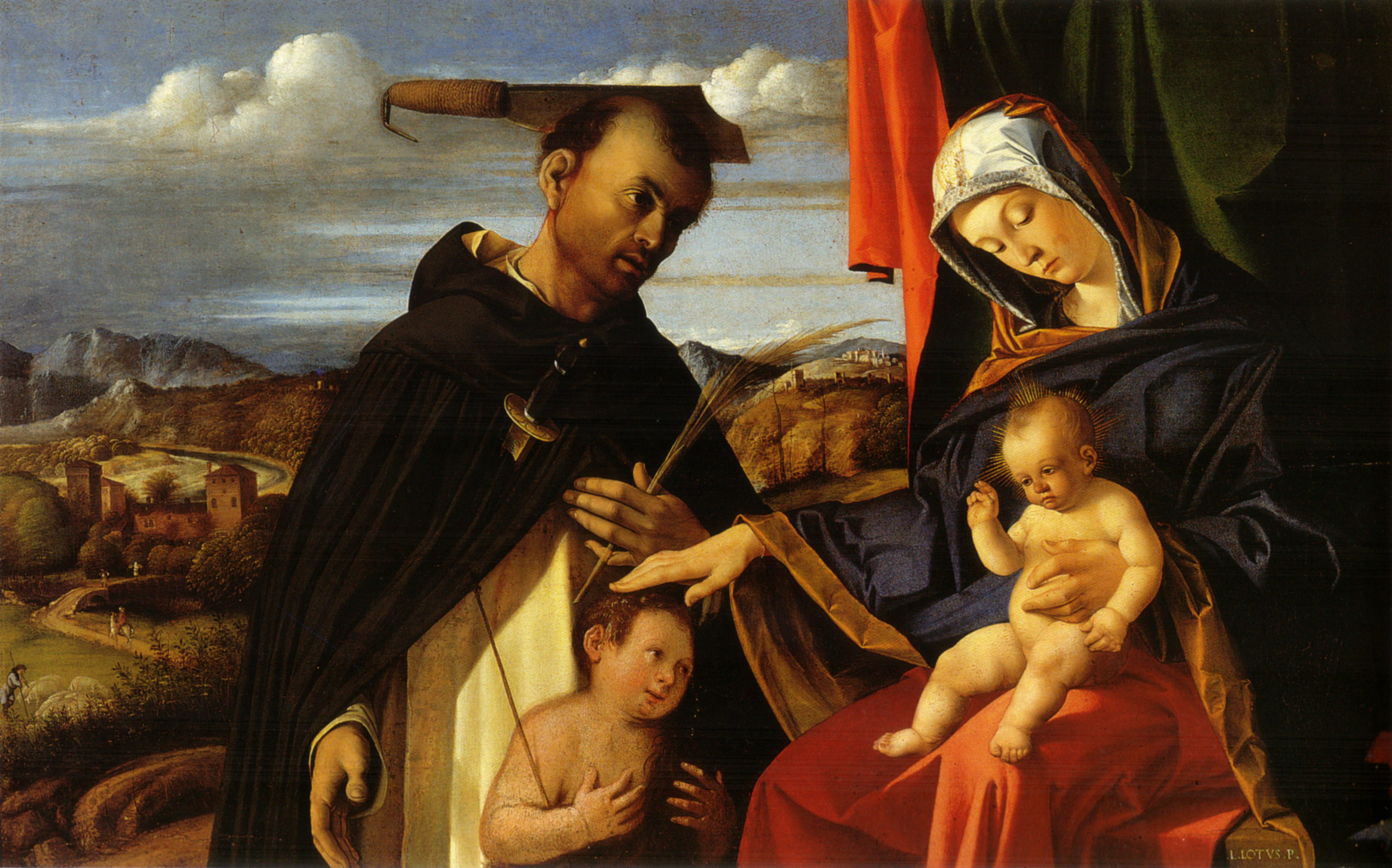
Madonna and Child with Saint Peter Martyr by Lorenzo Lotto, c. 1503

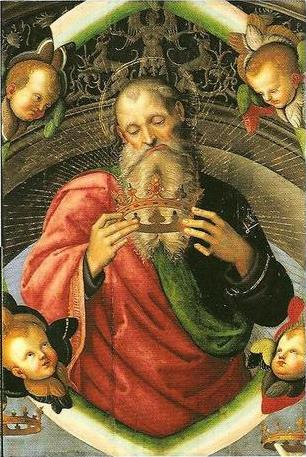
Baronci Altarpiece by Raphael, c. 1500–1501

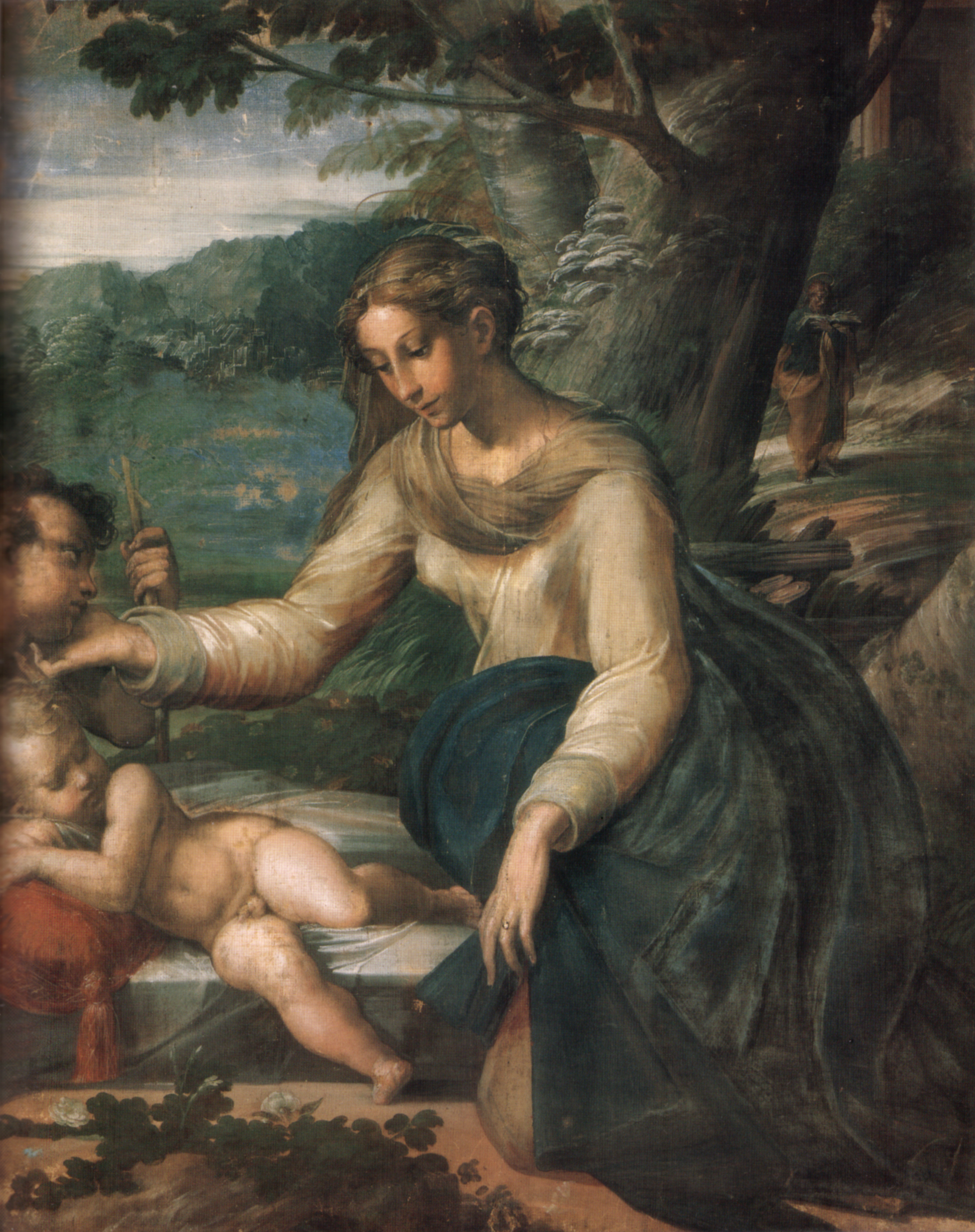
Holy Family with St. John by Parmigianino, c. 1528

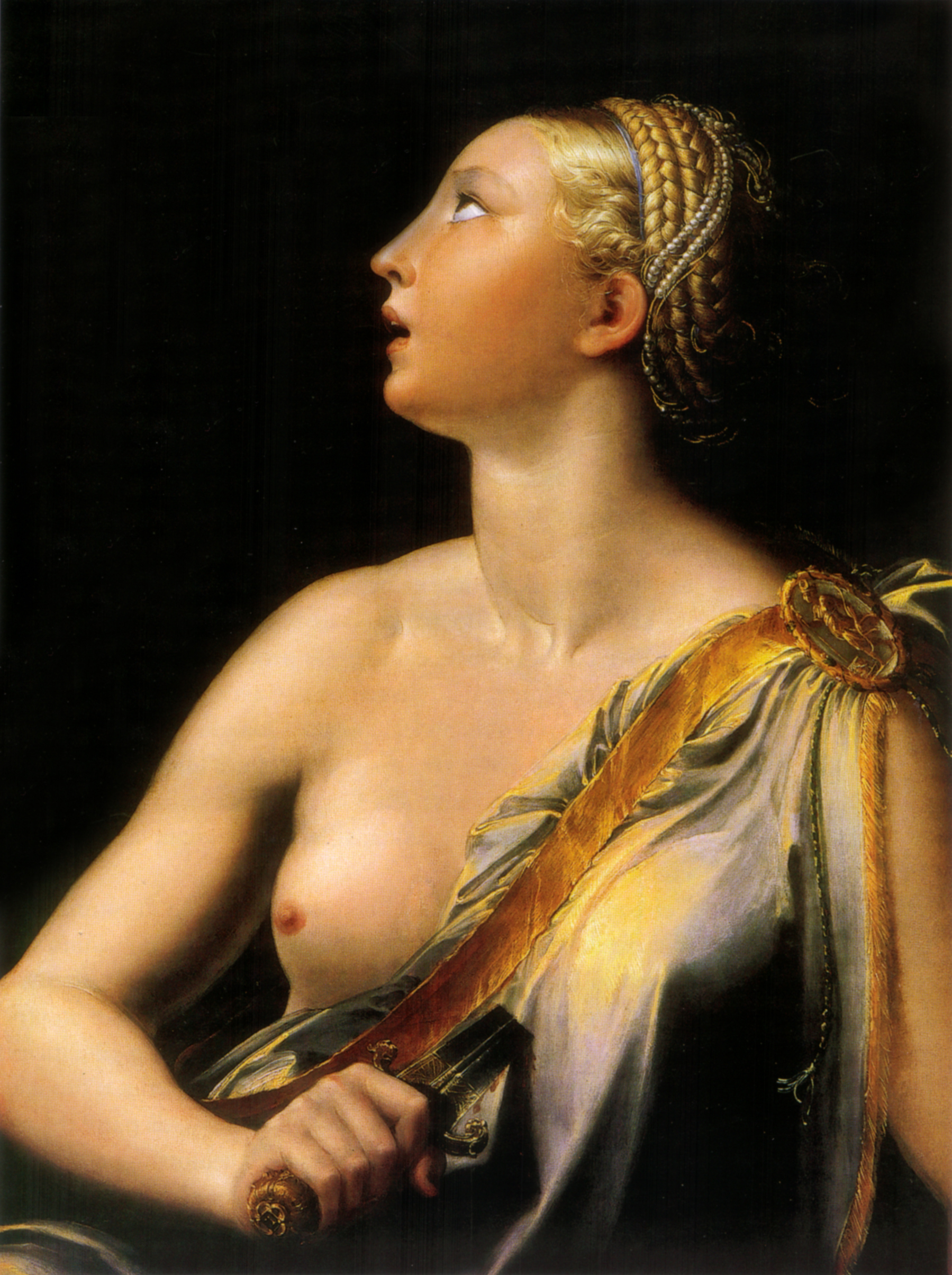
Lucretia by Parmigianino, c. 1540

A Boy Blowing on an Ember to Light a Candle by El Greco, c. 1570–1572

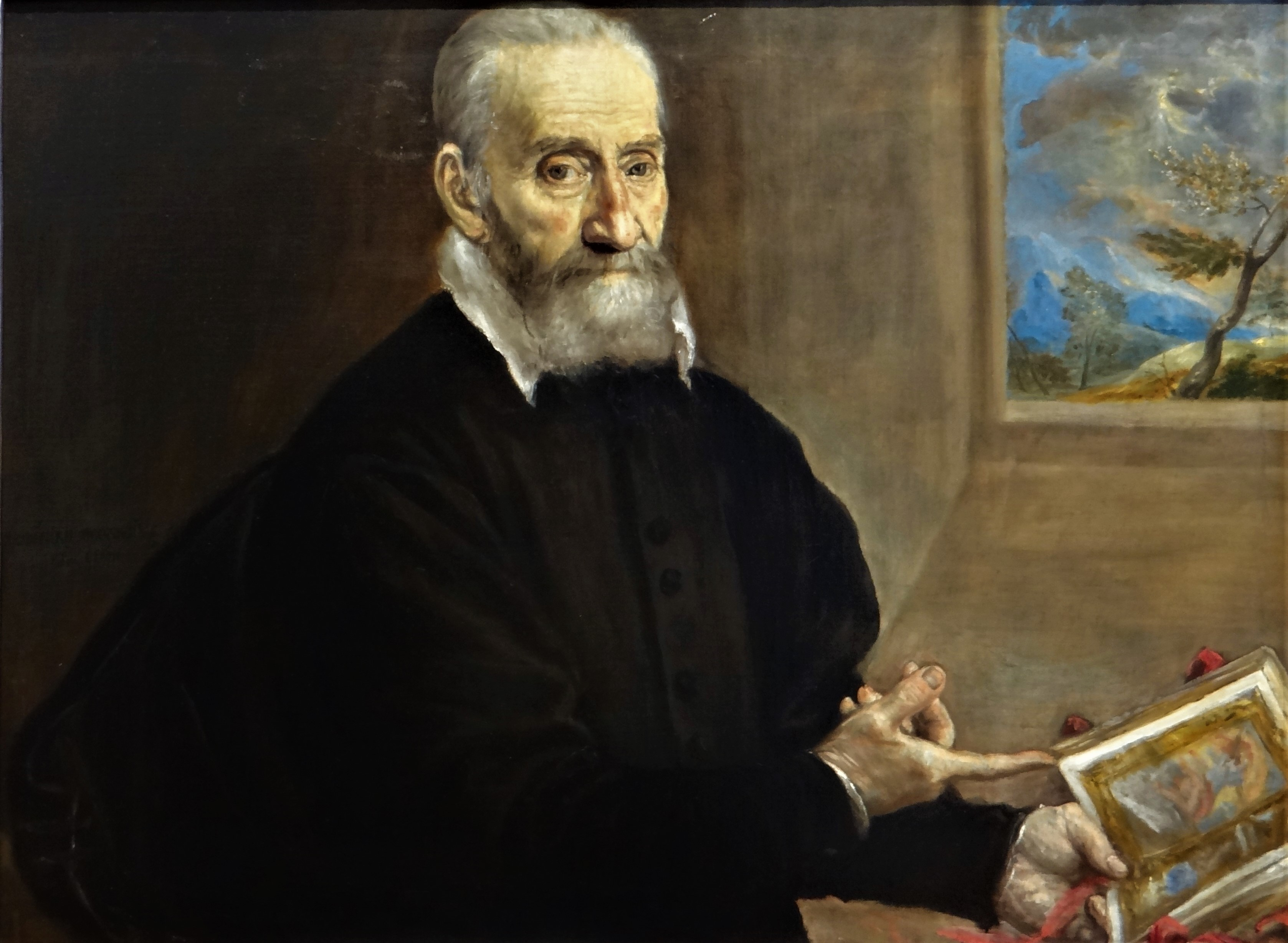
Portrait of Giulio Clovio by El Greco, 1571

Penitent Magdalene by Titian, c. 1550

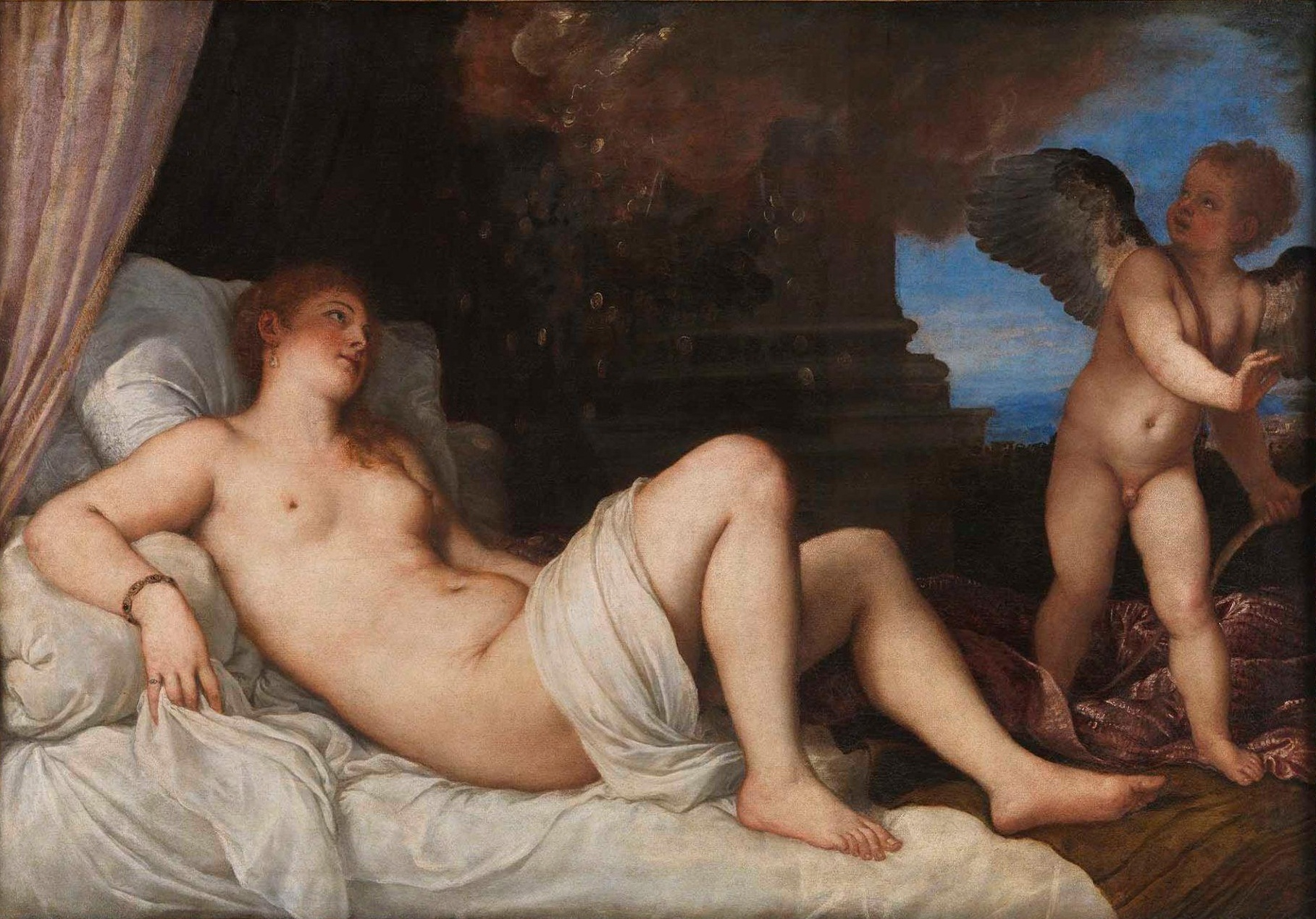
Danae by Titian, c. 1545

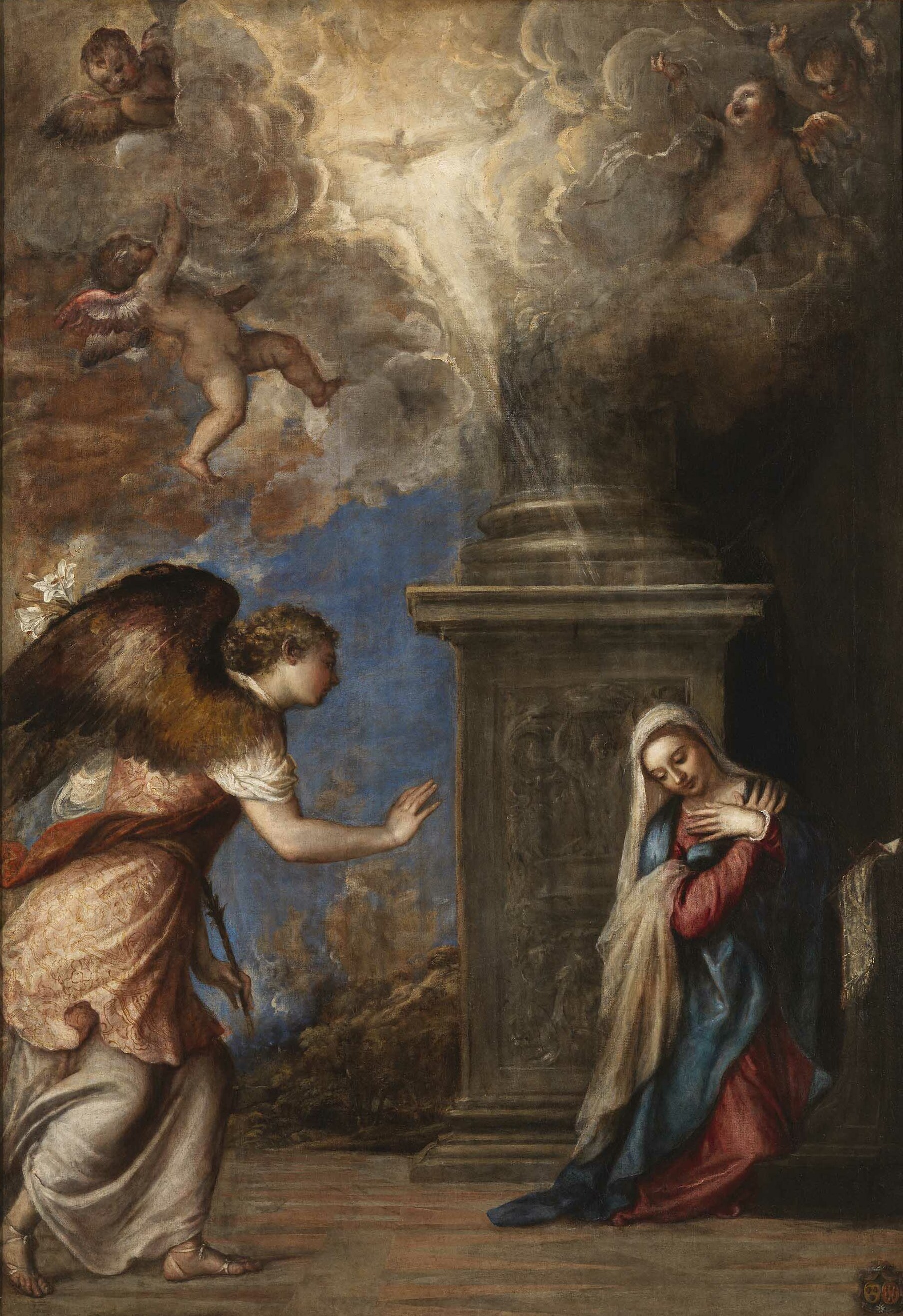
The Annunciation by Titian, c. 1557

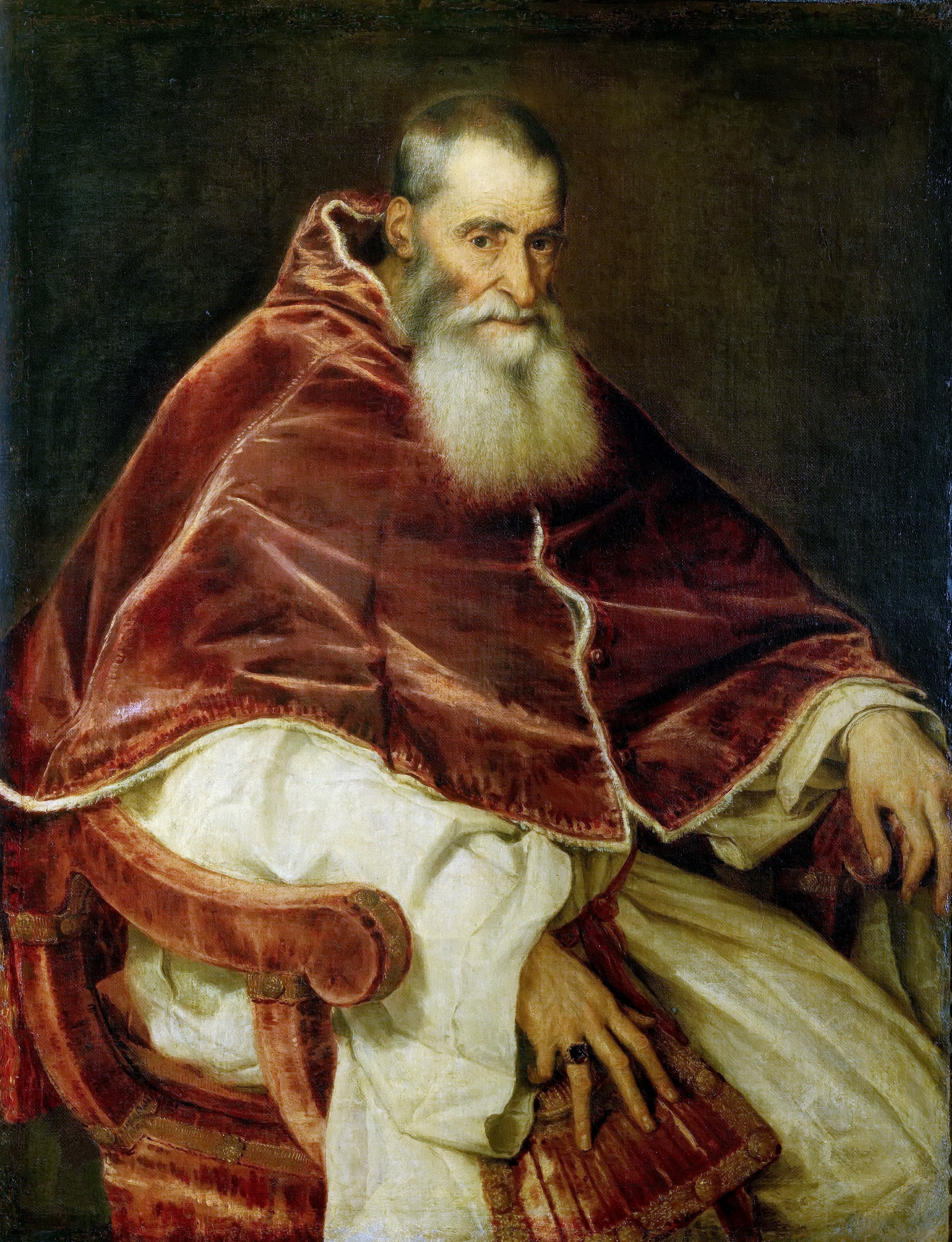
Portrait of Pope Paul III by Titian, c. 1543

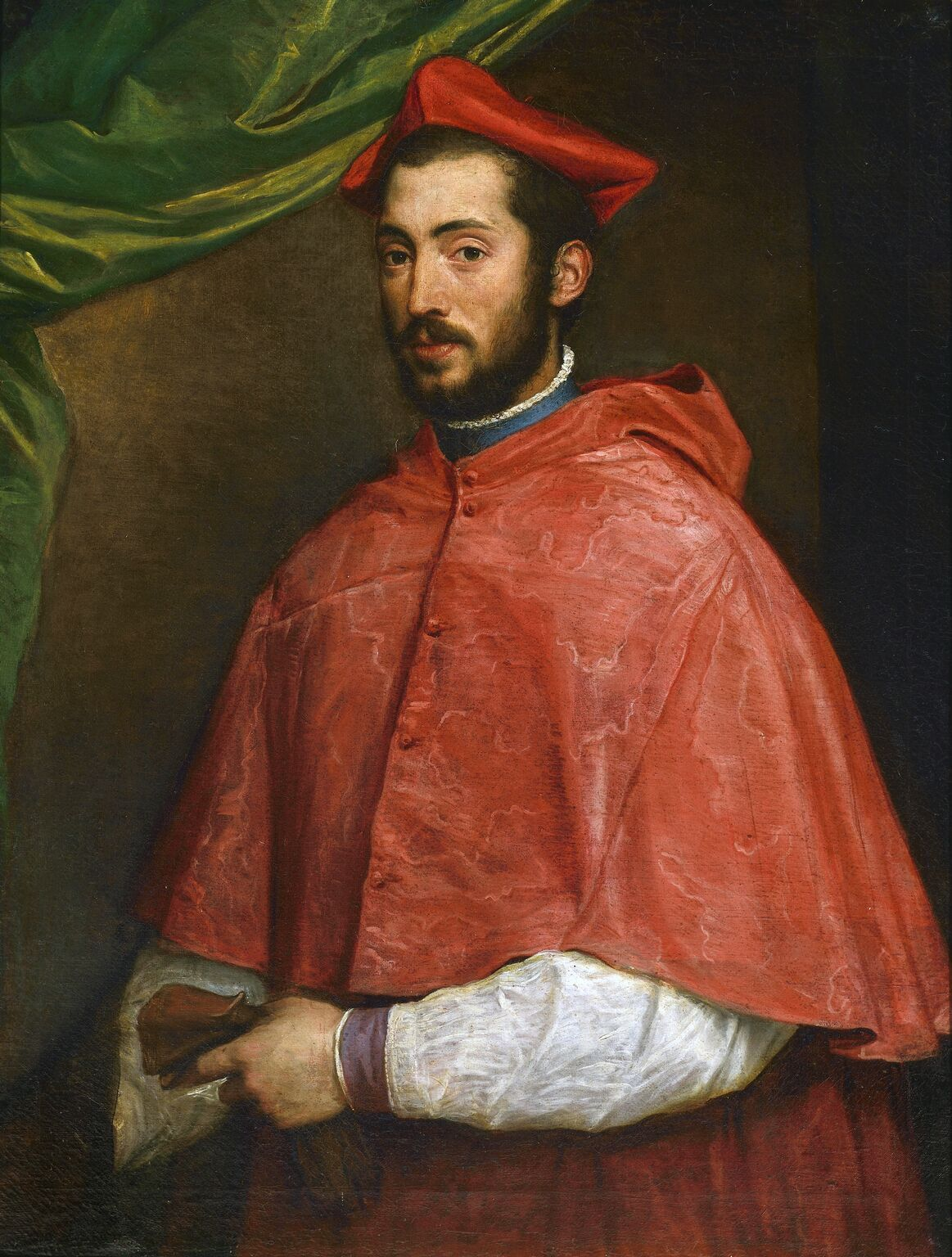
Portrait of Cardinal Alessandro Farnese by Titian, c. 1545–1546

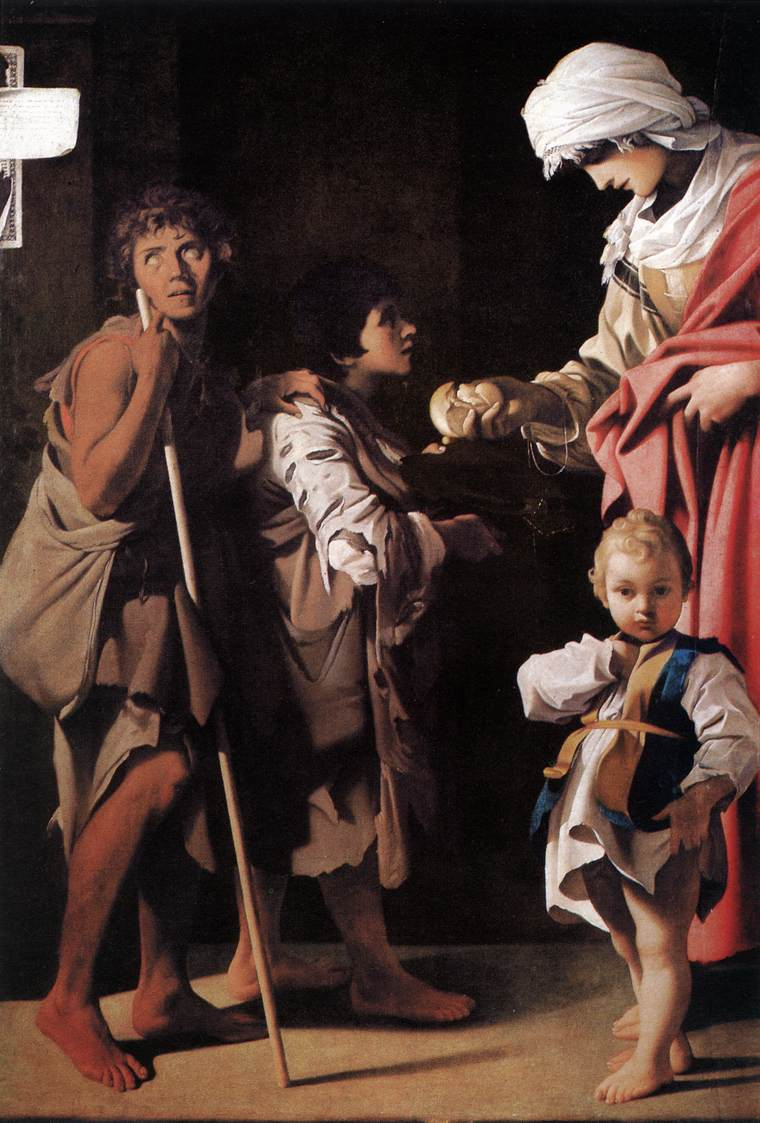
Charity by Bartolomeo Schedoni, c. 1611

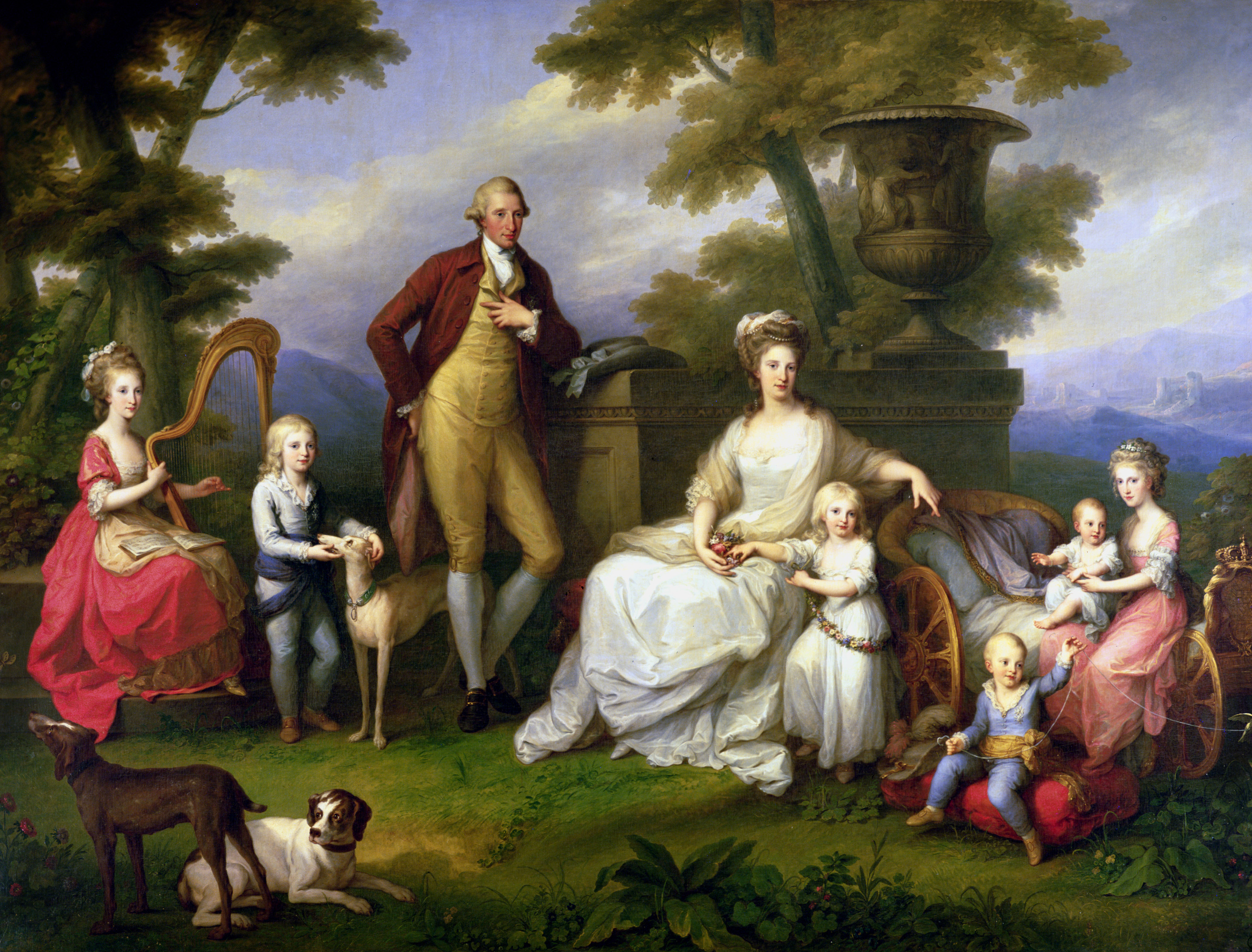
Ferdinando IV and His Family by Angelica Kauffman, c. 1783

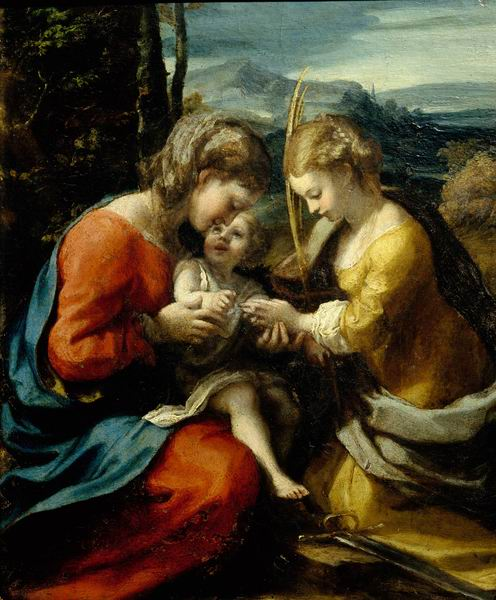
Mystical Marriage of St. Catherine by Correggio, c. 1520

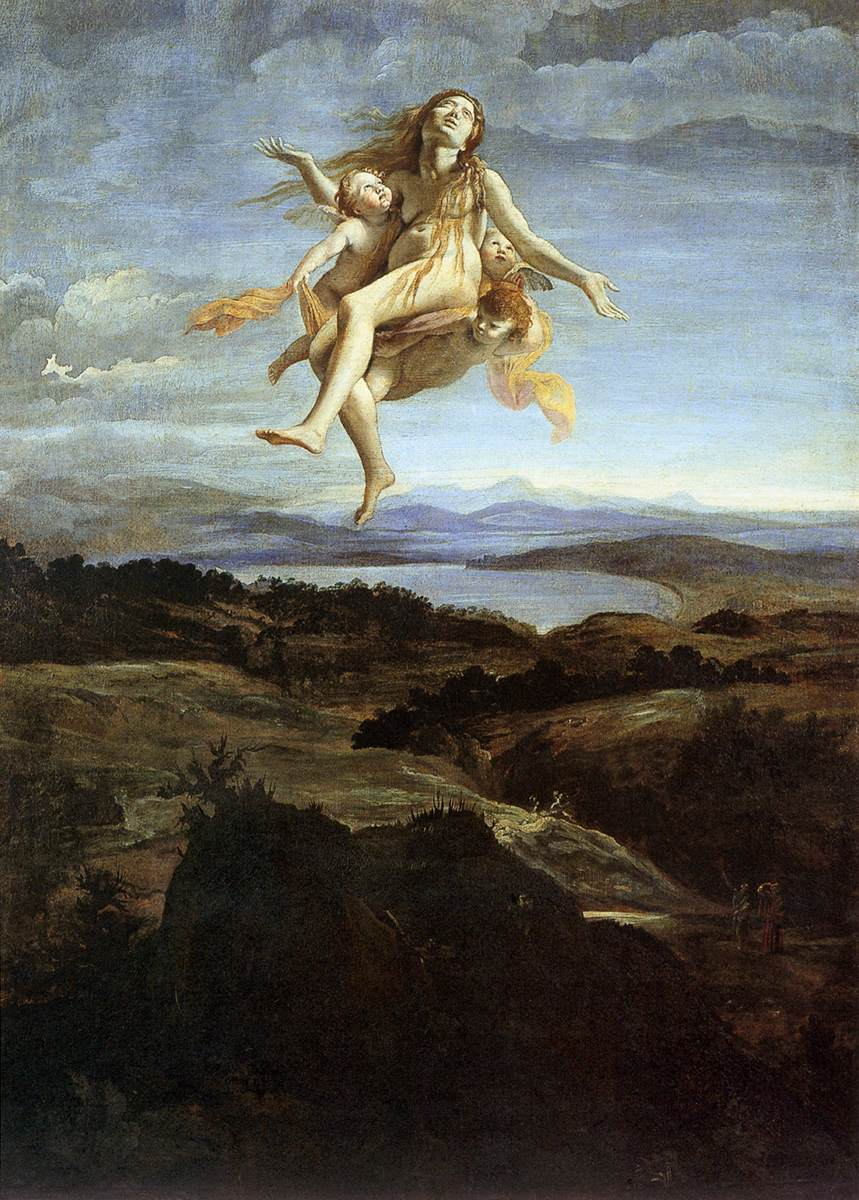
Glory of Mary Magdalene by Giovanni Lanfranco, c. 1616

== See also ==
- List of largest art museums

== Bibliography ==
- Nicola Spinosa (1999). Capodimonte (in Italian). Milan: Electa. ISBN 88-435-8613-0.
- Le Guide di Dove - Campania, Corriere della sera, 2007.
- Il Museo di Capodimonte, valori di Napoli, Pubblicomit, 2002.
