= The Fable (El Greco) =

1580 painting by El Greco

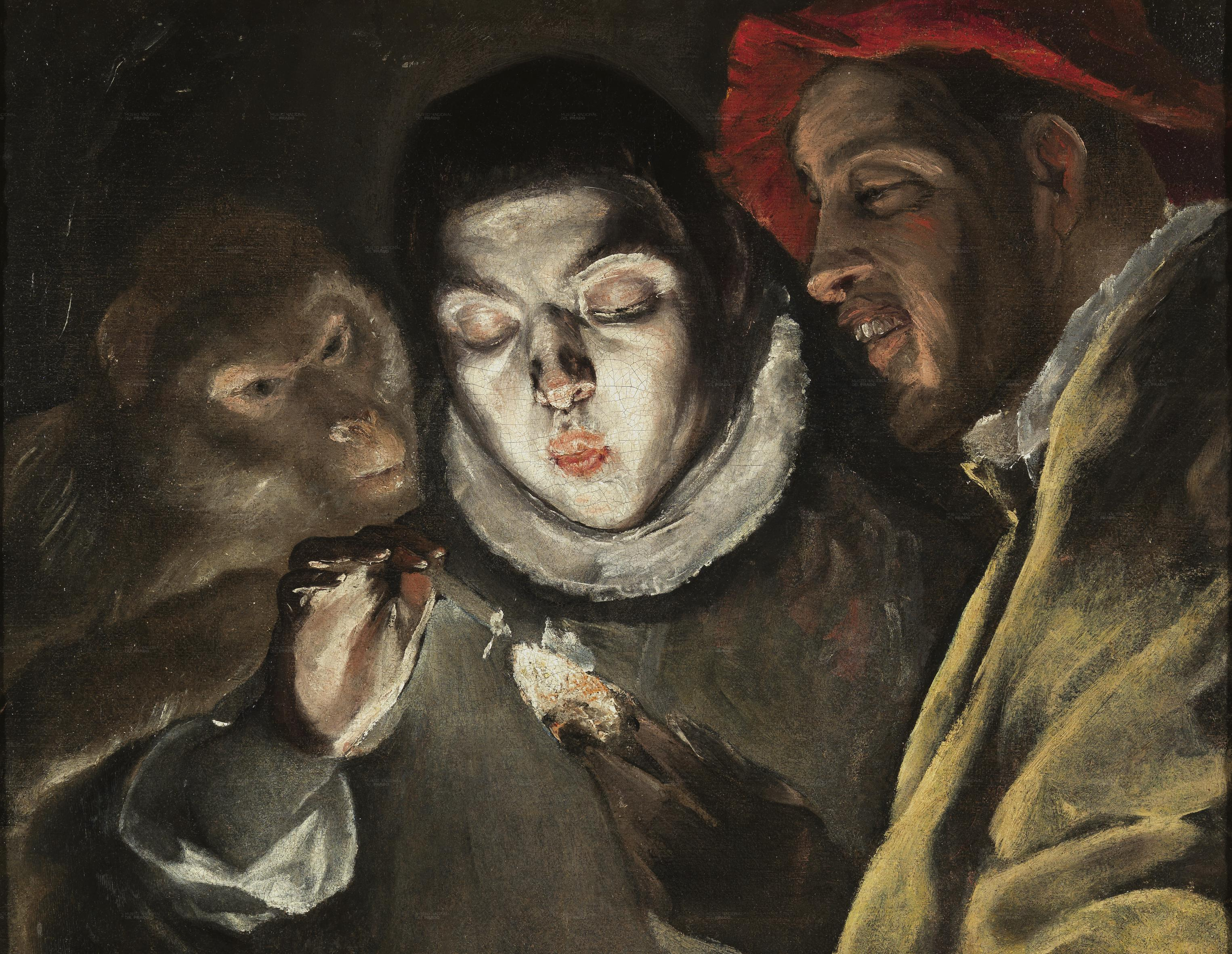
- Artist: El Greco
- Year: 1580
- Medium: oil on canvas
- Location: Museo del Prado, Madrid

The Fable (Spanish - La Fábula) is a 1580 allegorical painting by El Greco, produced early in his Toledan period and now in the Museo del Prado in Madrid.

The light effects and use of colour show the influence of Jacopo Bassano, which the painter had picked up in Italy. It shows a monkey and a rogue flanking a boy blowing on an ember or taper. The central figure was a frequent theme for the artist (he had painted it a few years earlier as El Soplón for example), drawn from a story in Pliny the Elder's Naturalis Historia.

The painting is probably a moralising warning about the consequences of lust, the ember bursting into flame symbolising sexual arousal, and the monkey and the buffoon the ever-present twin dangers of vice and folly.

== See also ==
- List of works by El Greco

== Bibliography (in Spanish) ==
- ÁLVAREZ LOPERA, José, El Greco, Madrid, Arlanza, 2005, Biblioteca «Descubrir el Arte», (colección «Grandes maestros»). ISBN 84-9550-344-1.
- SCHOLZ-HÄNSEL, Michael, El Greco, Colonia, Taschen, 2003. ISBN 978-3-8228-3173-1.
- https://web.archive.org/web/20100919104629/http://www.artehistoria.jcyl.es/genios/cuadros/824.htm
- http://www.museodelprado.es/coleccion/galeria-on-line/galeria-on-line/obra/fabula/
