= Giulio Clovio =

Croatian-Italian Renaissance painter, miniaturist

- Juraj Julije Klović
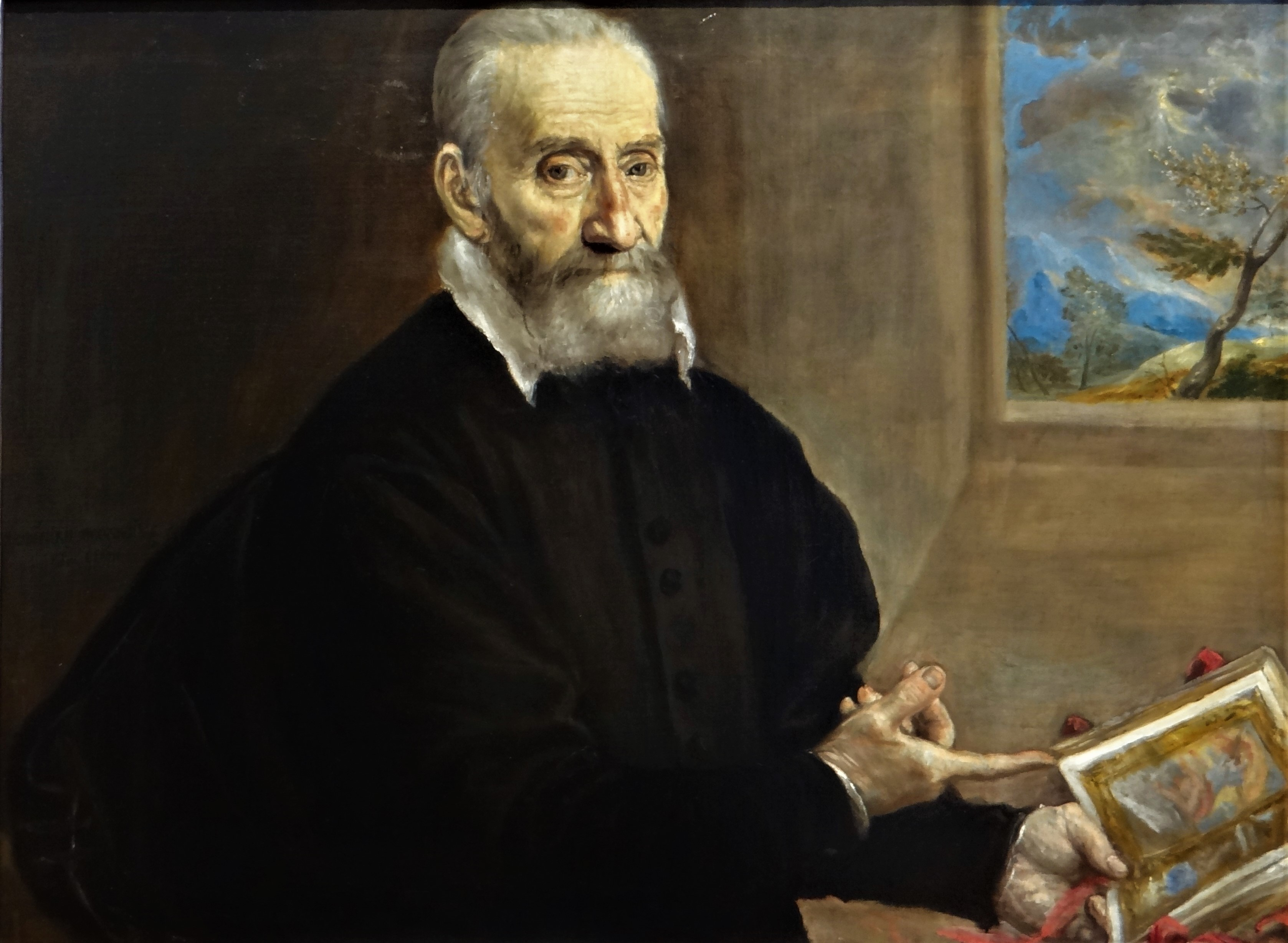
- Portrait of Giorgio Giulio Clovio, pointing to his Farnese Hours, by El Greco, 1571.
- Born: Juraj Julije Klović; 1498; Grižane, Kingdom of Croatia
- Died: 5 January 1578 (aged 79–80); Rome, Papal States
- Other names: Giorgio Giulio Clovio; Clovio Croata
- Known for: Illuminator, miniaturist, and painter
- Notable work: Farnese Hours (1546)
- Movement: High Renaissance

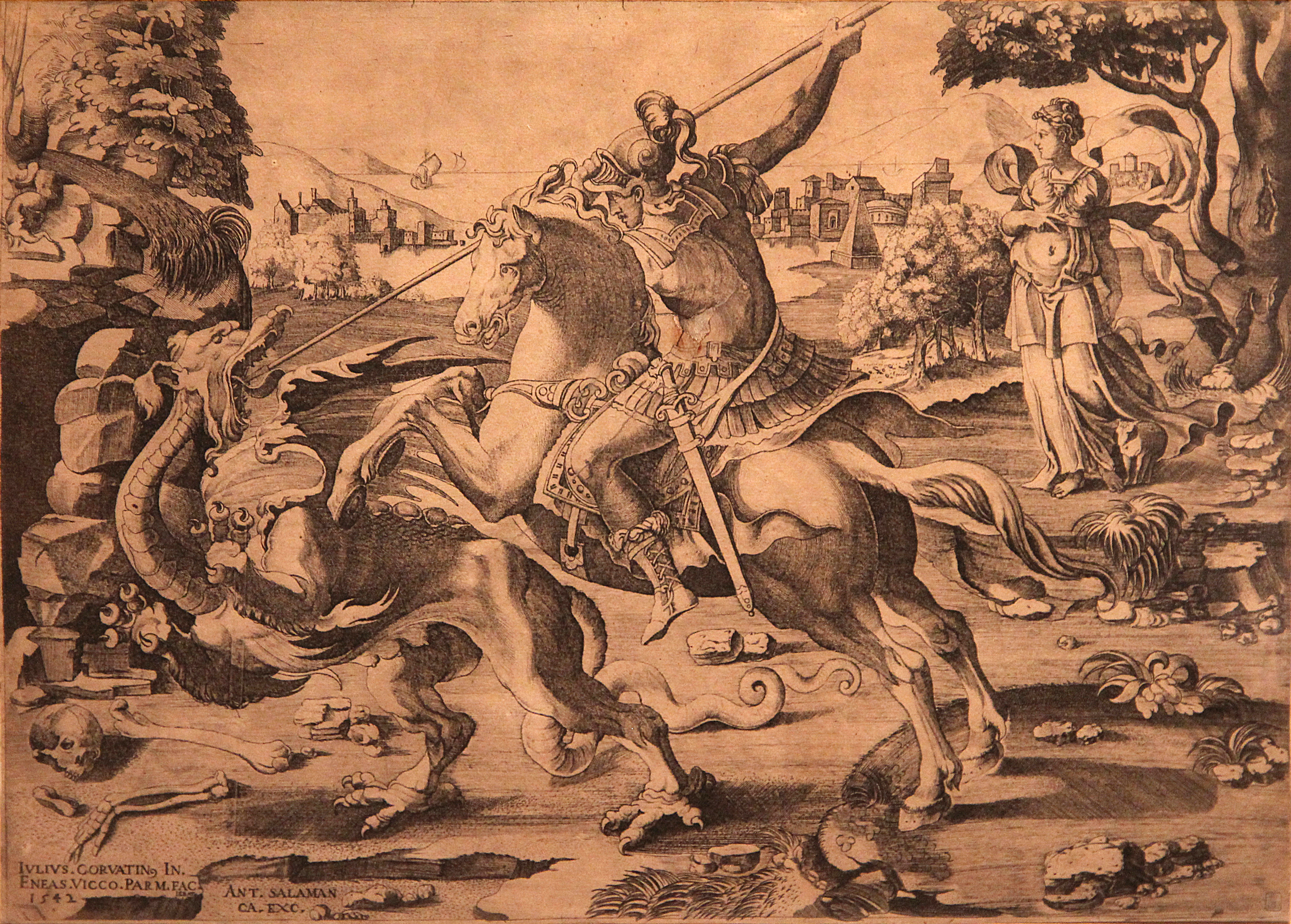
Engraving of the Cabinet des Estampes Enea Vico after Giulio Clovio (1522).

Juraj Julije Klović or Giorgio Giulio Clovio (1498 – 5 January 1578) was a Croatian–Italian illuminator, miniaturist, and painter born in the Kingdom of Croatia, who was mostly active in Renaissance Italy. He is considered the greatest illuminator of the Italian High Renaissance, and arguably the last very notable artist in the long tradition of the illuminated manuscript, before some modern revivals.

== Biography ==
Giulio Clovio was born in Grižane, a village in Kingdom of Croatia (today's Croatia). He came from a Croatian family, and he is known as Clovio Croata.

It is not known where he had his early training, but he may have studied art with monks at Rijeka of Novi Bazar when he was young.

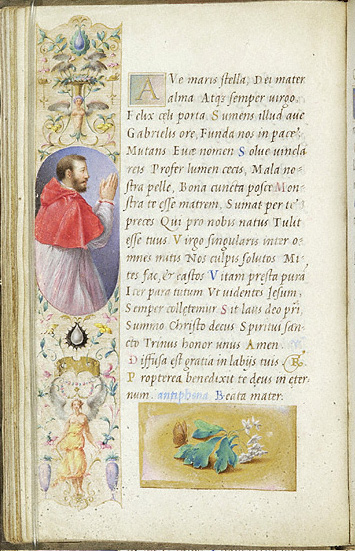
Clovio's patron, Cardinal Alessandro Farnese, from the Farnese Hours

He moved to Italy at age 18 and entered the household of Cardinal Marino Grimani where he was trained as a painter. Between 1516 and ca 1523 Clovio may have lived with Marino in the residence of the latter's uncle Cardinal Domenico Grimani in Rome. Clovio studied under Giulio Romano during this early period.

He also studied under Girolamo dai Libri.

While a protégé of Cardinal Domenico Grimani, Clovio engraved medals and seals for him, as well as the Grimani Commentary Ms., an important early illuminated book (now Sir John Soane's Museum, London).

By 1524 Clovio was at Buda, at the Hungarian court of King Louis II, for whom he painted the "Judgment of Paris" and "Lucretia". After Louis' death in the Battle of Mohács, Clovio travelled to Rome where he continued his career.

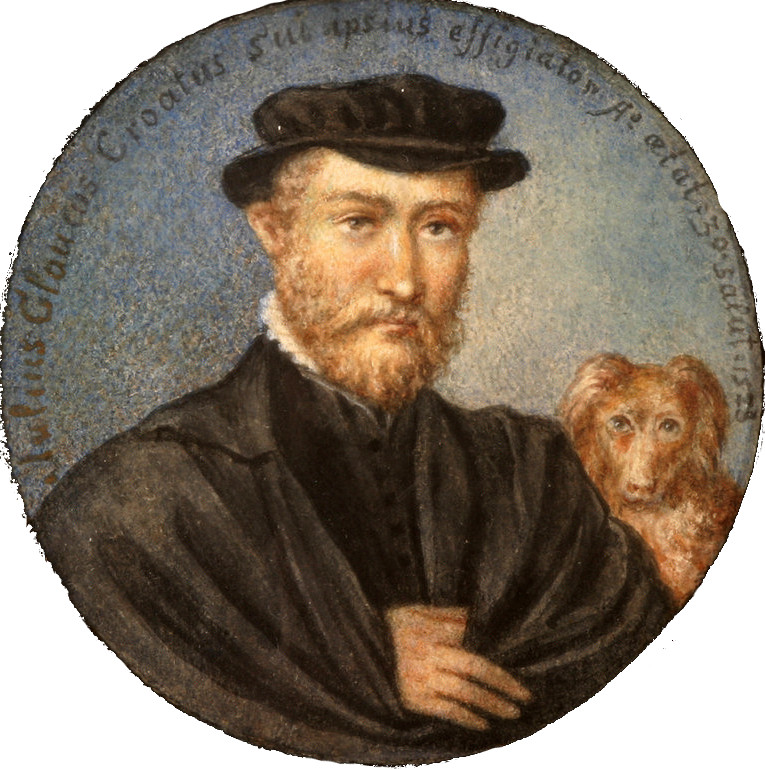
1528 autoportrait in the Strossmayer Gallery donated by Ivan Kukuljević in 1891

After 1527 he visited several monasteries of the Canons Regular of St. Augustine. In 1534 Clovio returned to the household of Cardinal Marino Grimani. A year later Clovio may have followed Marino when the latter was appointed as a papal legate to Perugia, where Clovio is thought to have worked on illustrations for the Soane Manuscript written by Marino Grimani around that time. Clovio likely returned to Rome by the end of 1538 when he is known to have met with the writer Francisco de Hollanda.

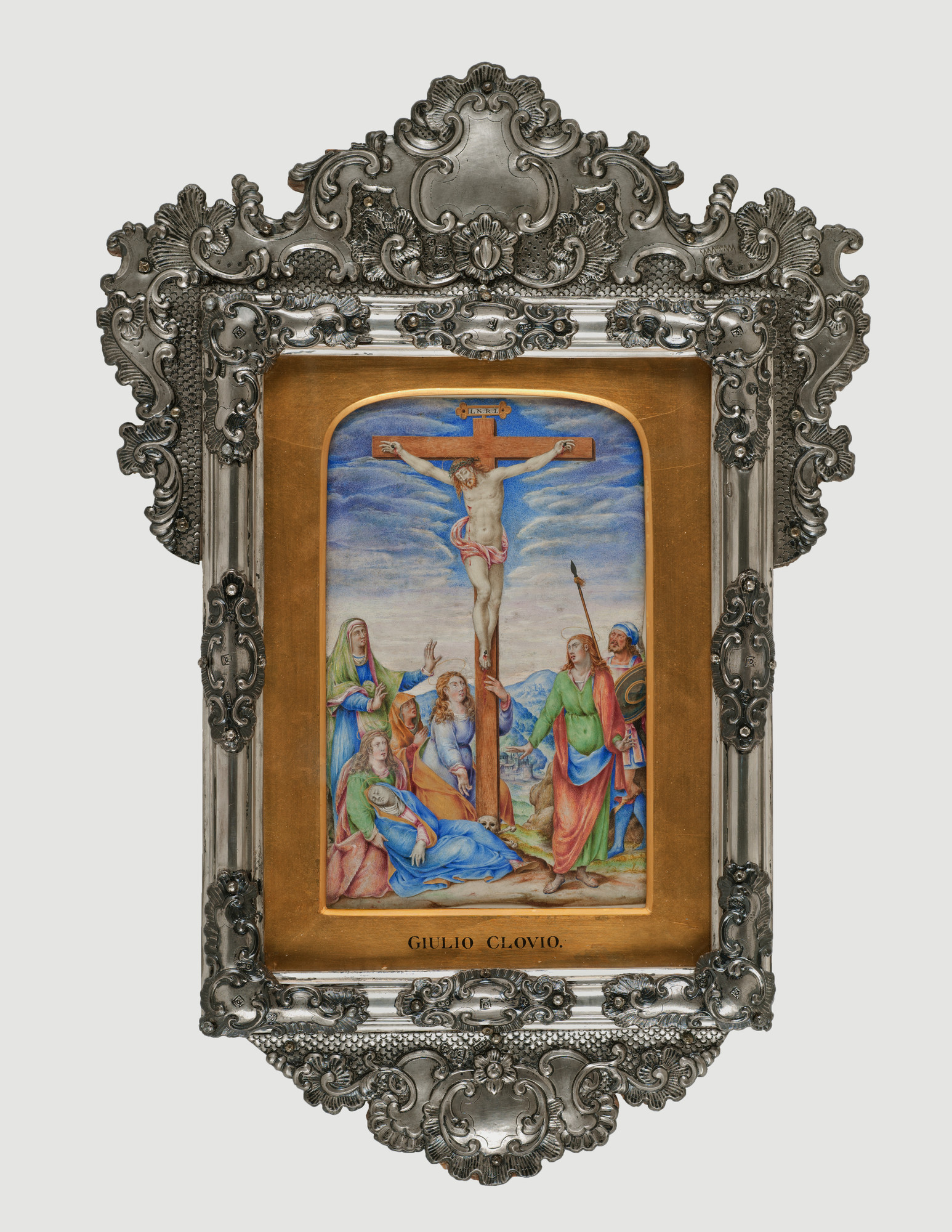
Attributed to Giulio Clovio (Italian, 1498–1578). Crucifixion, ca. 1572. Tempera on parchment, 9 1/8 x 5 5/8 in. (23.2 x 14.3 cm). Brooklyn Museum, Gift of A. Augustus Healy

Clovio later became a member of the household of Alessandro Farnese with whom he would be associated until his death. It was during his time with Farnese that Clovio created one of his masterpieces, the Farnese Hours. Other well-known works from this period include the illustrations for the Towneley Lectionary.

From 1551 to 1553 Clovio is known to have worked in Florence. During this time he painted a miniature of Eleanor of Toledo (England, Welbeck Abbey, Private Collection).

== Contact with other artists ==
Clovio was a friend of the much younger El Greco, the celebrated Greek artist from Heraklion on Crete, who later worked in Spain, during El Greco's early years in Rome. El Greco painted two portraits of Clovio; one shows the four painters whom he considered his masters; in this, Clovio is side by side with Michelangelo, Titian, and Raphael. Clovio was also known as Michelangelo of the miniature. Books with his miniatures became famous primarily due to his skilled illustrations. He was persuasive in transferring the style of Italian high Renaissance painting into the miniature format.

Pieter Bruegel the Elder was a personal friend of Giulio Clovio, and stayed with Clovio in Rome during his Italian trip of 1553. Breugel executed a small medallion depicting ships in a storm on a Clovio miniature of the Last Judgment (New York Public Library), but the six Bruegels mentioned in Clovio's will have all disappeared.

== Major works ==
=== Soane Manuscript ===
Clovio illuminated the Commentary of Marino Grimani on St Paul's Epistle to the Romans. This work is now in the Sir John Soane Museum in London. The commentary consists of 130 vellums. Two large miniatures are included, as well as richly decorated borders. The miniatures depict the conversion of St Paul.

=== Farnese Hours ===
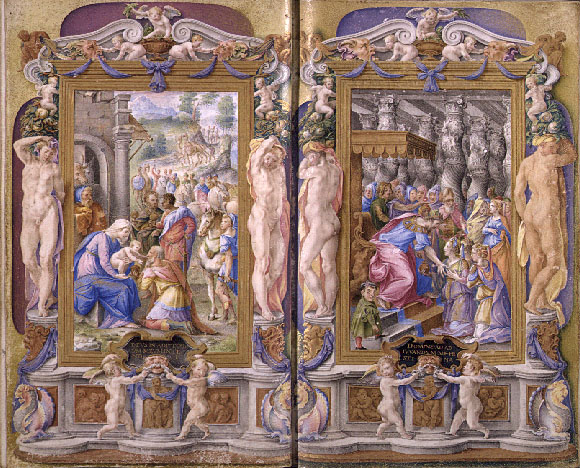
Farnese Hours (1546), Morgan Library & Museum, New York

His most famous work is the Farnese Hours, completed in 1546 for Cardinal Alessandro Farnese, which was nine years in the making (now Morgan Library, New York). He is pointing to this work in the El Greco portrait (above). This contains twenty-eight miniatures depicting Adoration of the Magi and Solomon Adored by the Queen of Sheba, from Old and New Testament scenes, but with a famous double-page picture representing the Corpus Christi procession in Rome. It has splendid silver-gilt covers, although they are not by Benvenuto Cellini, as Vasari claimed.

=== Towneley Lectionary ===
The Towneley Lectionary is now in the New York Public Library and probably belonged to Cardinal Alessandro Farnese. Used during services, the book contained six majestic, full-page miniatures opposite miniature depictions of the Evangelists. The illustrations introduced the relevant readings from the Scripture. They include the Nativity, the Resurrection and the Last Judgment.

=== Colonna Missal ===
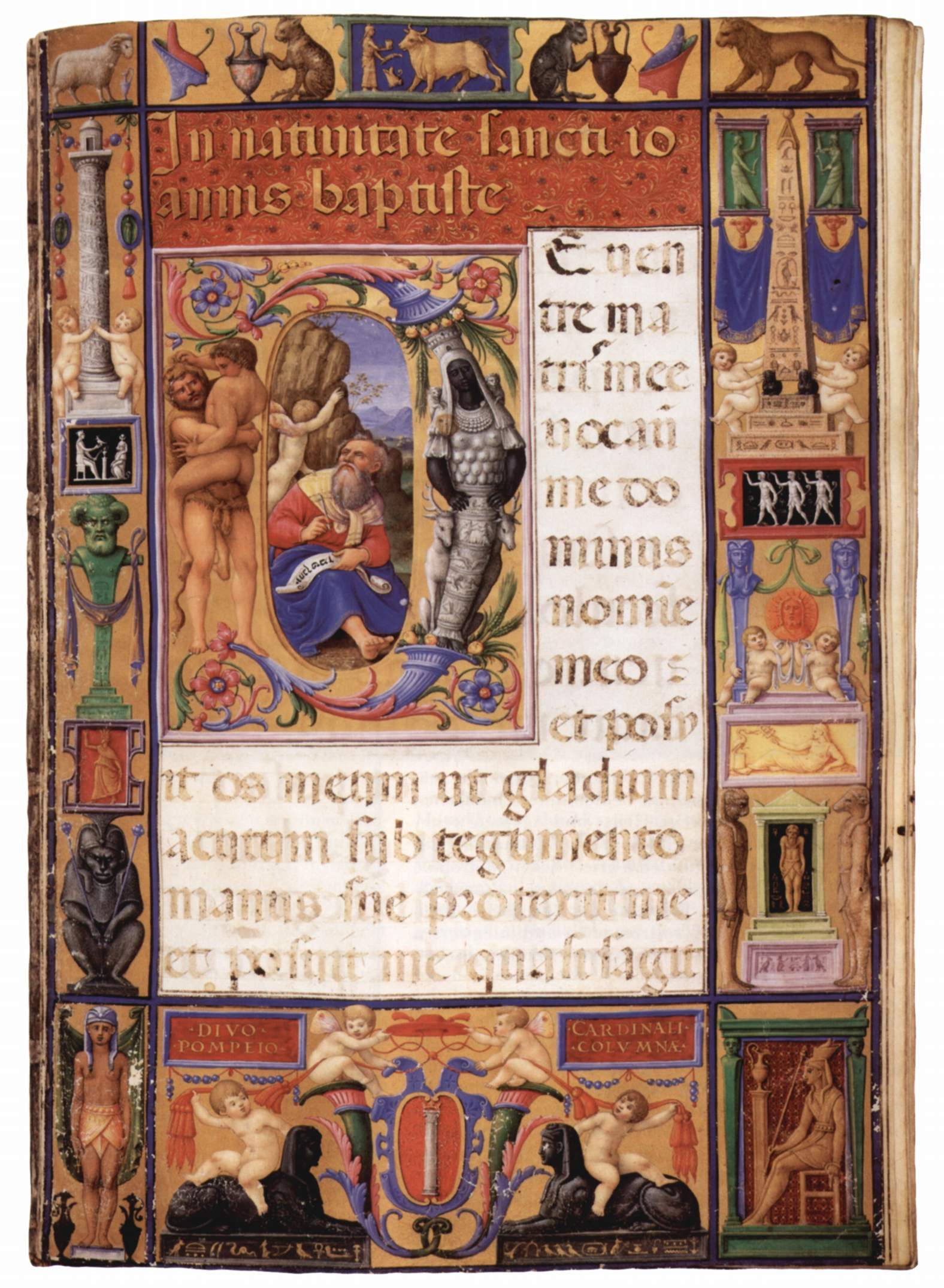
An illuminated page from his Colonna missal, 1530s, John Rylands Library, Manchester

This work is now in the John Rylands Library in Manchester. The Colonna Missal was made for Cardinal Pompeo Colonna. There had been some debate about the identity of the artist. Some had attributed the missal to Raphael (about 1517). It has also been suggested that the work may belong to Vinzenzio Raimondi. It is now generally attributed to Clovio.

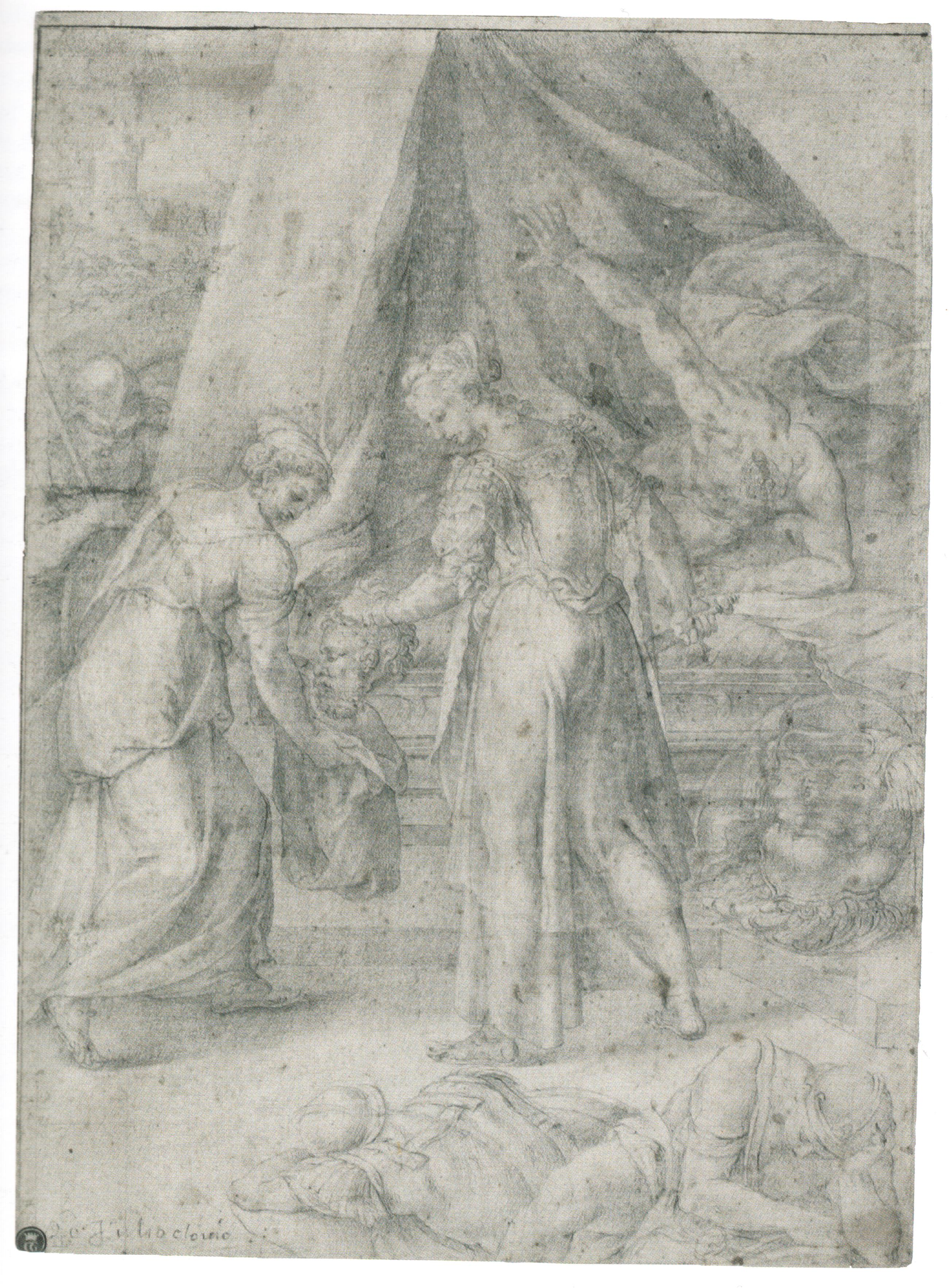
Judith Beheading Holofernes, drawing, silwerpoint or charcoal, 322*238 mm, 1550–1560., Zagreb, Croatian Academy of Sciences and Arts - Department of Prints and Drawings

=== Other ===
The British Library has his twelve full-page miniatures of the victories of the Emperor Charles V, and the Stuart de Rothesay Book of Hours, which was originally commissioned by Cardinal Marino Grimani and includes 4 miniatures by Giulio Clovio.

The Vatican Library has a manuscript life of Federigo III di Montefeltro, Duke of Urbino, superbly illustrated by Clovio. Other illustrations by him are kept in libraries in Vienna, New York City, Munich, and Paris, and in many private collections. A large exhibition of his works was held in 2012 in Klovićevi Dvori ("Palace of Klović"), the art gallery dedicated to him in Zagreb.

According to a description written for publication by Antonfrancesco Cirni, he also designed many of the costumes for the famously elaborate wedding festivities of Ortensia Borromeo in March 1565, which were held in the Vatican and included a tournament in the Belvedere courtyard. Such duties were often expected of a Renaissance court painter. The costumes are carefully recorded in a series of anonymous etchings, some probably based on Clovio's design drawings.

== Death and burial ==
Giulio Clovio died in Rome on 5 January 1578. His tomb is in the Basilica of San Pietro in Vincoli, the church containing Michelangelo's celebrated Moses.

== 500th anniversary ==
Croatia celebrated the 1998 500th anniversary of his birth. The Croatian National Bank issued a special 200 kuna silver coin in commemoration. A monument to Clovio was also raised in Drivenik. The Croatian government recently made news by purchasing Clovio's The Last Judgement, a painting Clovio gave as a gift to Pope Clement VII. Bernardin Modrić released his film The Gospel According to Klović in 2006. The Vatican celebrated this anniversary with postal stamps.

== Legacy ==
Today, Giulio Clovio is celebrated in Italy and Croatia. He was born in the Kingdom of Croatia and stated his Croatian identity. But, for most of his life he worked in Italy, and is therefore often referred to as an Italian painter.

== Sculptures ==
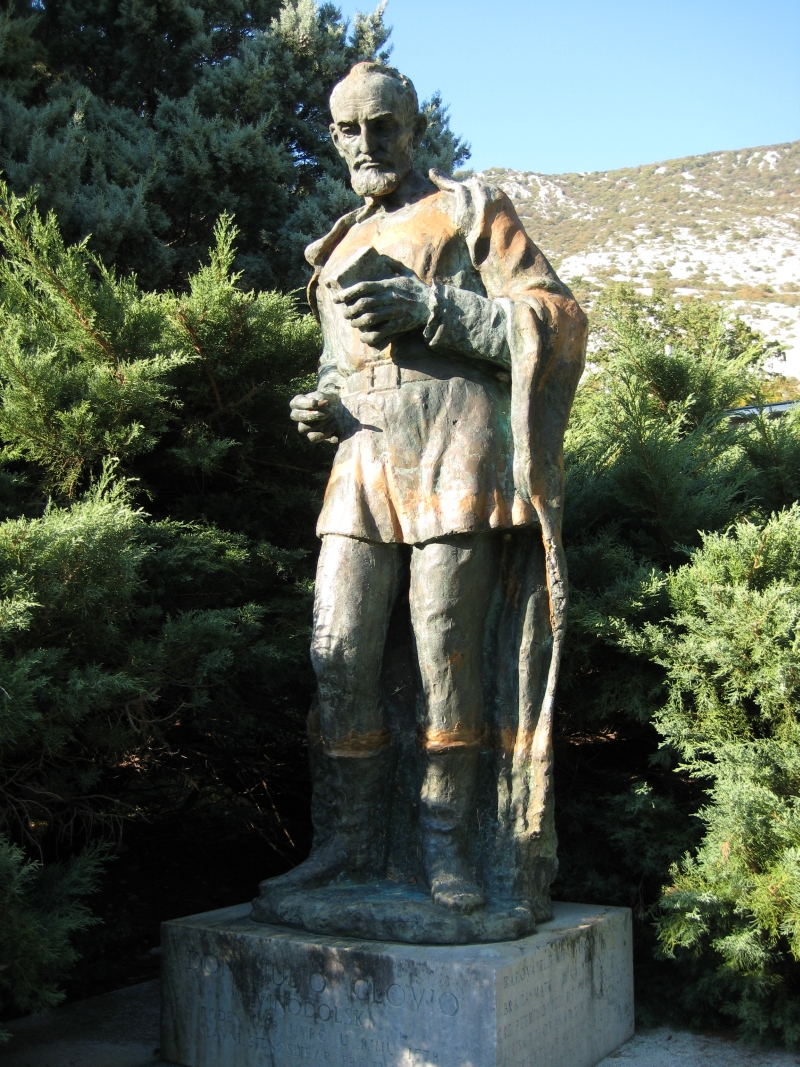
Statue in Drivenik

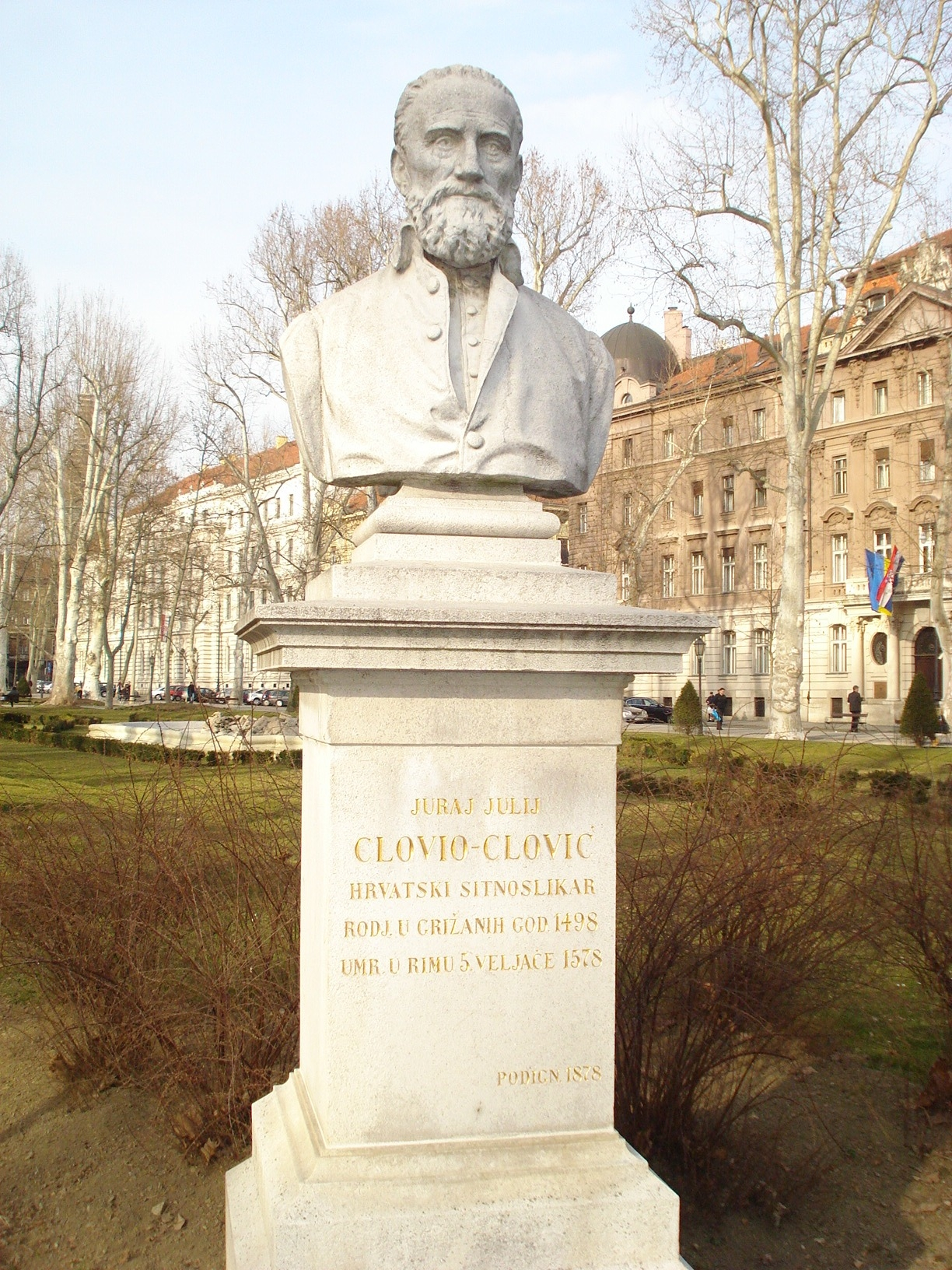
Bust in Zrinjevac park, Zagreb

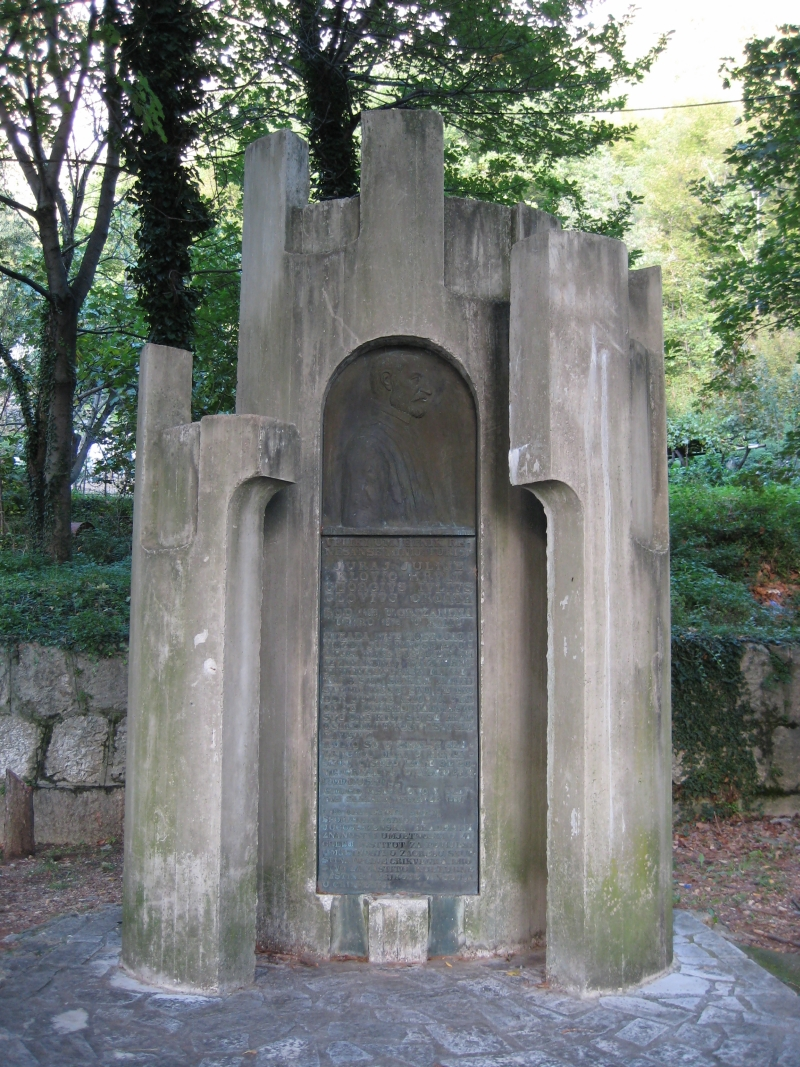
Monument in Grižane

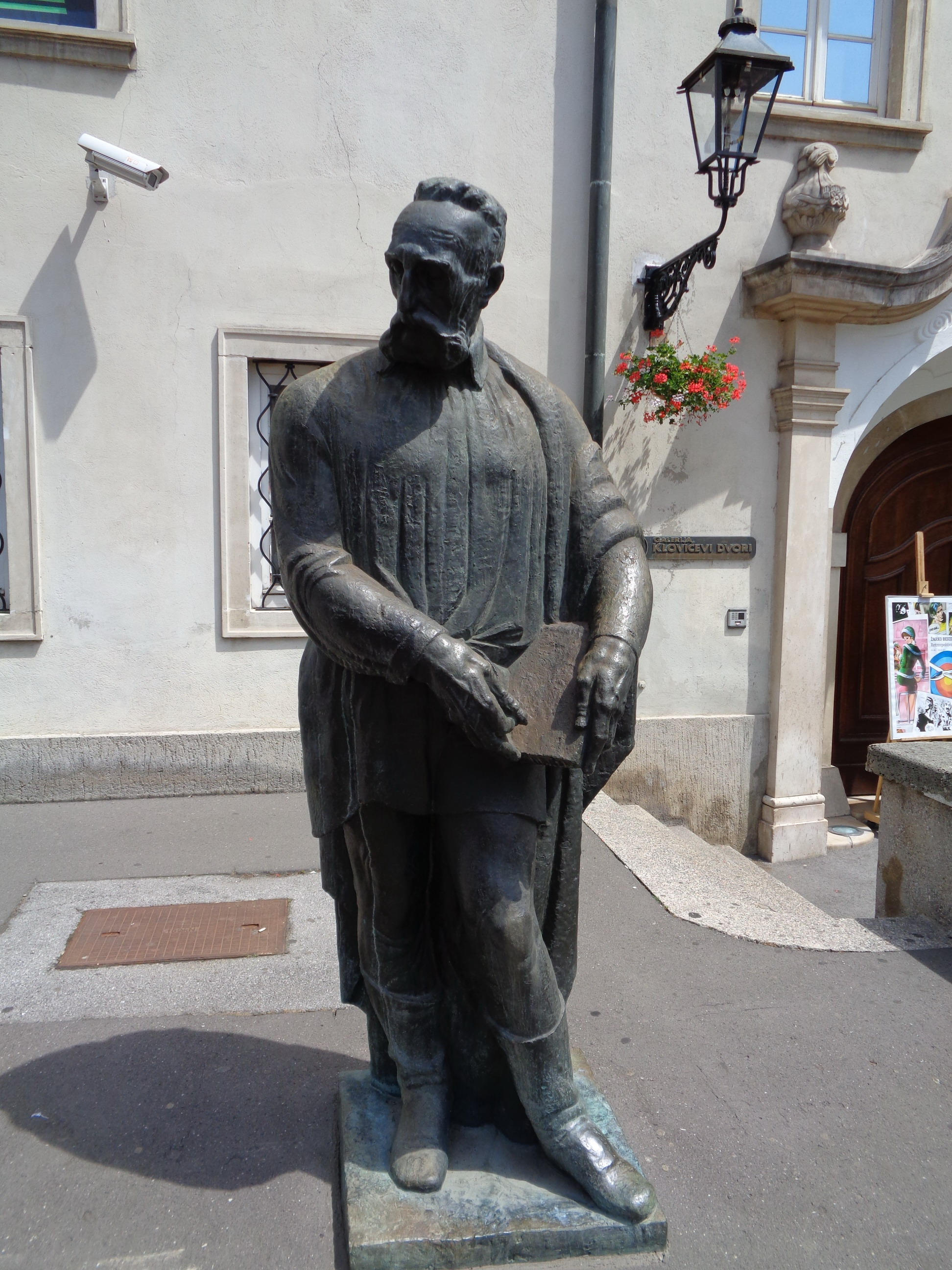
Statue in front of Klovićevi Dvori Gallery, Zagreb

== See also ==
- Croats of Italy

== Sources ==
- Bradley, John W. (2004). The Life and Works of Giorgio Giulio Clovio Miniaturist with Notices of His Contemporaries and of the Art of Book Decoration in the Sixteenth Century. Kessinger Publishing. ISBN 978-1-4179-4605-1.
