= Portrait of Giulio Clovio =

Painting by El Greco

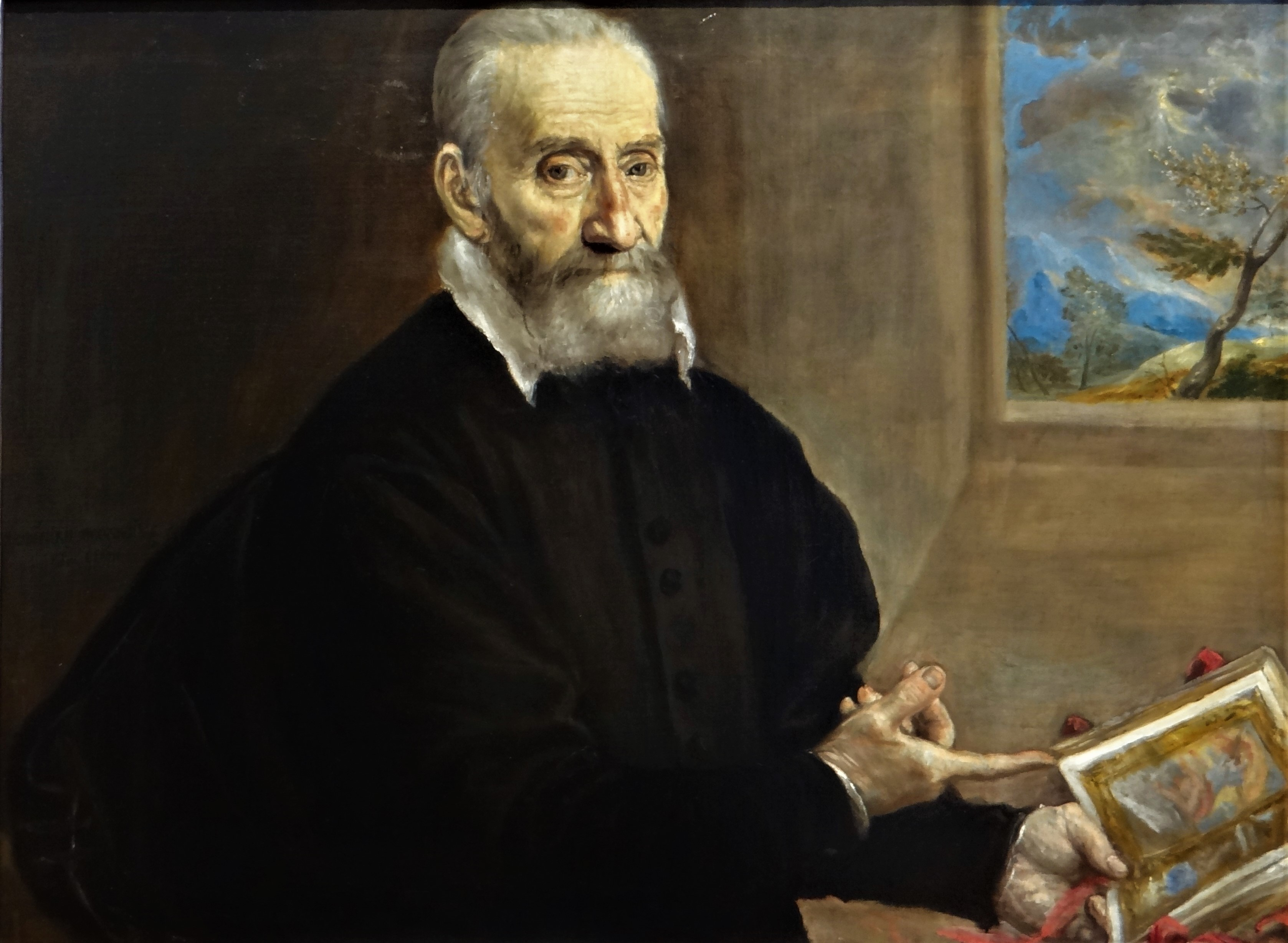
- Artist: El Greco
- Year: c. 1571
- Medium: oil on canvas
- Dimensions: 58 cm × 86 cm (23 in × 34 in)
- Location: Museo nazionale di Capodimonte, Naples, Italy

Portrait of Giulio Clovio is a Renaissance era painting by El Greco c. 1571. It was commissioned by Italian cardinal Alessandro Farnese during the artist's stay in Rome. It formed part of the Farnese collection. Charles of Bourbon inherited it in 1734 and moved it to Naples, where it now hangs in the Museo di Capodimonte.

Its subject Giulio Clovio (Julije Klović, born 1498 in Croatia) was a noted miniaturist, called "the Michelangelo of the miniature" by Giorgio Vasari. He had helped El Greco settle in Rome. Clovio is shown holding his masterpiece work, the Farnese Hours. In the background, there is a window showing a landscape and a stormy sky.

== See also ==
- List of works by El Greco

== Bibliography ==
- (in Spanish) J. Álvarez Lopera, El Greco, Madrid, Arlanza (2005), Biblioteca «Descubrir el Arte», (colección «Grandes maestros»). ISBN 84-95503-44-1
- (in Spanish) M. Scholz-Hanzsel, El Greco, Colonia, Taschen (2003). ISBN 978-3-8228-3173-1
