= Antiphilus =

Greek painter

Antiphilus (Ancient Greek: Ἀντίφιλος) was an ancient Greek painter from Naucratis, Egypt, in the age of Alexander the Great. He worked for Philip II of Macedon and Ptolemy I of Egypt. Thus, he was a contemporary of Apelles, whose rival he is said to have been, but he seems to have worked in quite another style. Quintilian speaks of his facility: the descriptions of his works which have come down to us show that he excelled in light and shade, in genre representations, and in caricature.

== Paintings of Antiphilus on display in ancient Rome ==
In ancient Rome, according to Pliny the Elder, the Schola Octaviae was ornamented by paintings by Antiphilus, among which were his Hesione and his painting of the group of Alexander and Philip with Minerva. The Curia Pompeii, famous as the place of assassination of Julius Caesar, was of the form called an exedra, or hall furnished with seats, and was decorated with pictures of Cadmus and Europa by Antiphilus.
