= Farnese Hours =

Illuminated manuscript by Giulio Clovio from 1546

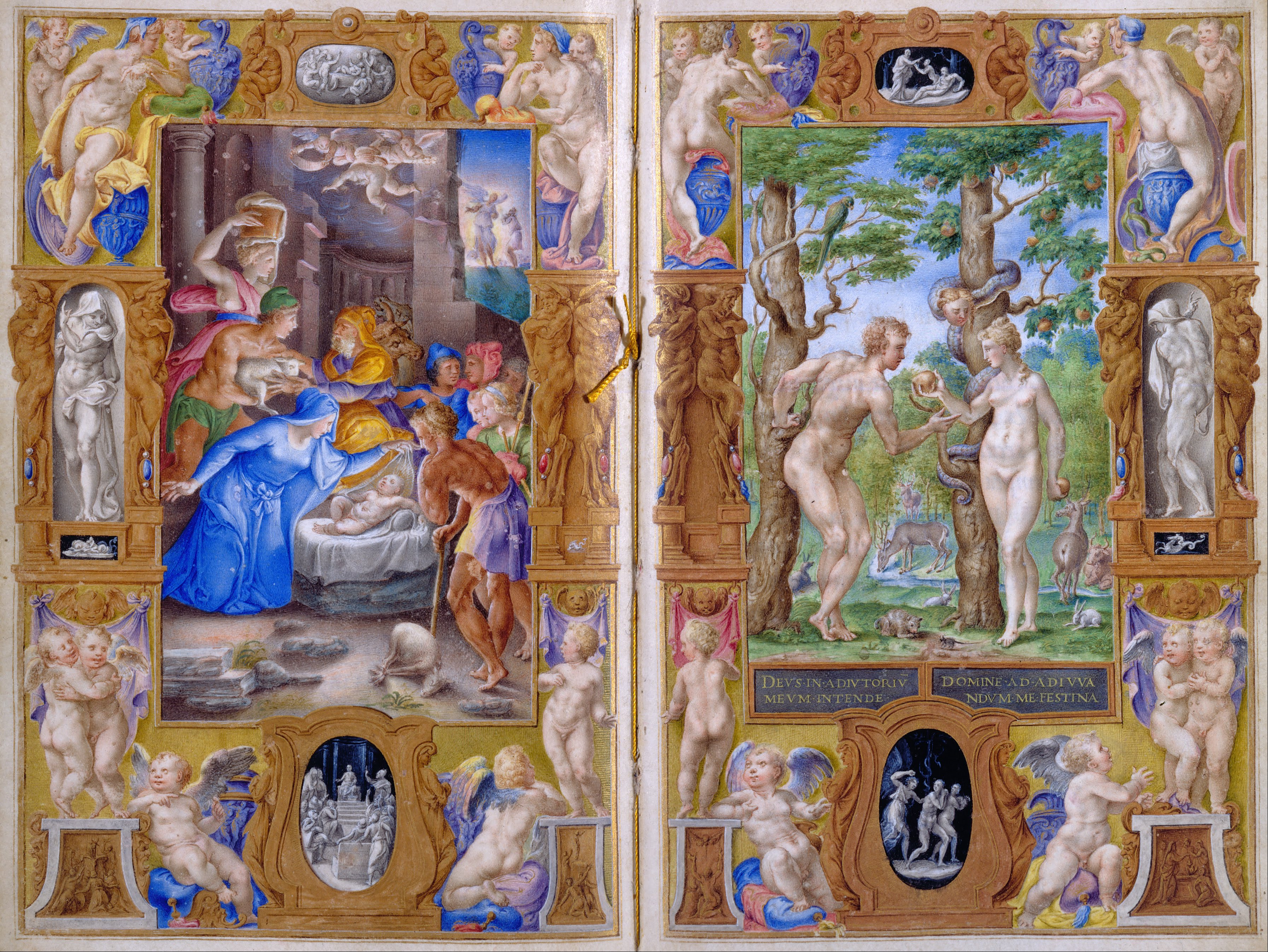
- Artist: Giulio Clovio
- Year: 1546
- Medium: Illumination on parchment
- Dimensions: 11.1 cm × 17.1 cm (4.38 in × 6.75 in)
- Location: The Morgan Library & Museum, New York City

The Farnese Hours is an illuminated manuscript book of hours created by Giulio Clovio for Cardinal Alessandro Farnese in 1546. Considered the masterpiece of Clovio, it is now in the Morgan Library & Museum in New York City.

It is often regarded as the last major manuscript book of hours. It contains the usual texts and prayers, and illustrations with architectural borders and classical nudes.
