= Vidima (river) =

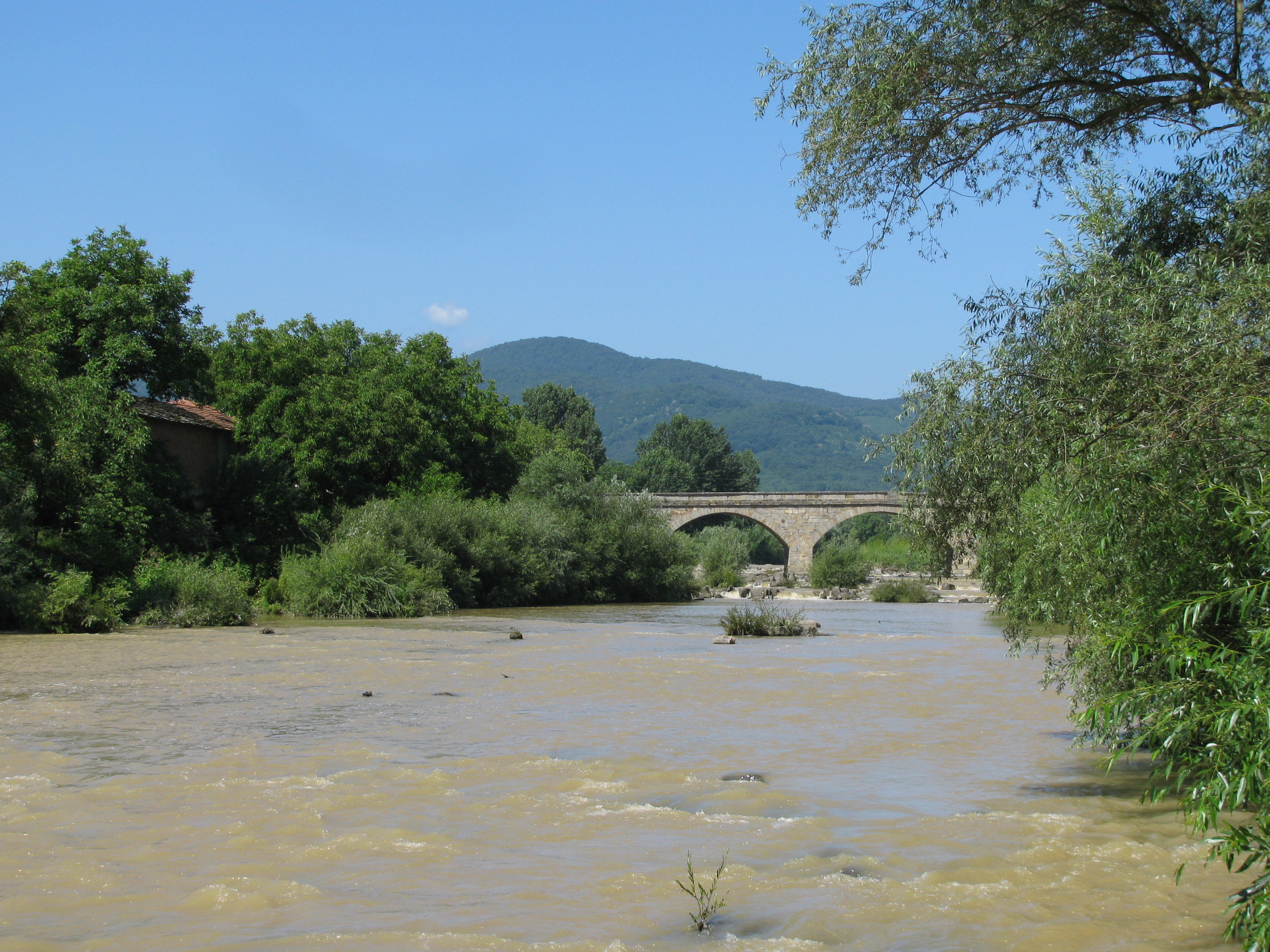

Location
- Country: Bulgaria

Physical characteristics
- Source
  - location: NW of Botev Peak, Balkan Mountains
  - coordinates: 42°43′17.04″N 24°54′16.92″E
  - elevation: 2,040 m (6,690 ft)
- Mouth
  - location: Rositsa
  - coordinates: 42°59′41.04″N 25°54′38.88″E
  - elevation: 206 m (676 ft)
- Length: 68 km (42 mi)
- Basin size: 554 km^{2} (214 sq mi)

Basin features
- Progression: Rositsa→ Yantra→ Danube→ Black Sea

The Vidima (Bulgarian: Видима) is a 68 km-long river in northern Bulgaria, a left tributary of the Rositsa, itself a left tributary of the river Yantra of the Danube basin. It is the largest tributary of the Rositsa.

== Geography ==
The Vidima takes its source under the name Vasilkovitsa at an altitude of 2,040 m on the northwestern foothills of the Botev Peak (2,376 m), the highest summit of the Balkan Mountains. Its uppermost course falls within the Severen Dzhendem Reserve in the Central Balkan National Park. It flows north in a deep forested valley until the outskirts of the town of Apriltsi. In the town its receives the Dyasna (Right) Vidima, which is considered the starting point of the river proper. Downstream of Apriltsi the river turns northwest and runs through the Novoseltsi Valley. The Vidima again heads north between the villages of Velchevo and Debnevo, forming a picturesque canyon-like valley. It then turns east and the valley widens. The river flows into the Rositsa at an altitude of 206 m some 3 km south of the town of Sevlievo.

Its drainage basin covers a territory of 554 km^{2} or 24.2% of the Rositsa's total.

The Vidima has rain–snow feed with high water in April–June and low water in August–October. The average annual discharge at its mouth is 5.6 m^{3}/s.

== Settlements and economy ==
The river flows in Lovech and Gabrovo Provinces. There are one town and six villages along its course: Apriltsi (town), Skandaloto and Velchevo in Apriltsi Municipality, Debnevo in Troyan Municipality, and Berievo, Gradinitsa and Dushevo in Gabrovo Municipality. Its waters are utilized for irrigation in the lower course and small scale electricity production in the upper course at the Vidima Hydro Power Station.

On its upper tributary the Praskalska reka in the Balkans Mountains is located the 80 m high Vidimsko Praskalo waterfall, situated in a dramatic difficultly accessible area of the Severen Dzhemdem Reserve.

There are two roads along its course: a 12.4 km stretch of the third class III-404 road Bogatovo–Sevlievo–Debnevo follows the river's right bank between Gradinitsa and Debnevo, a 14 km section of the third class III-404 road Kalofer–Apriltsi–Troyan follows its valley between Apriltsi and Velchevo, and an 11.3 km section of the third class III-3505 road runs along the Vidima between Debnevo and Velchevo.

== Gallery ==
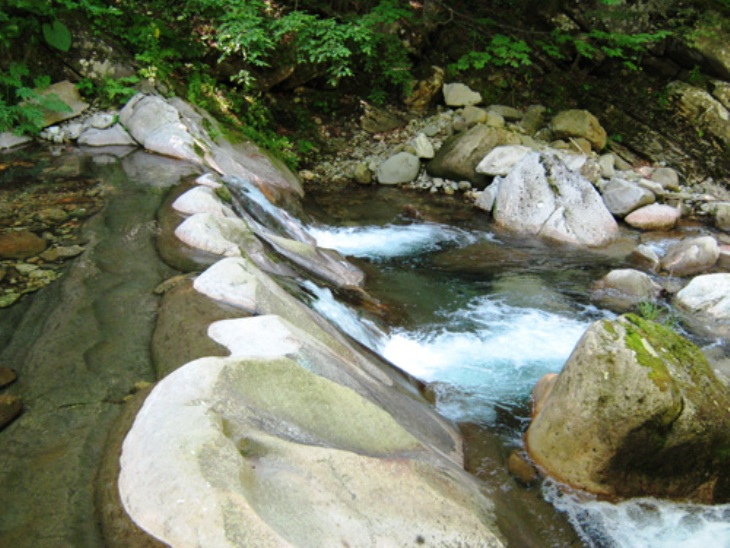
The upper course of the Vidima

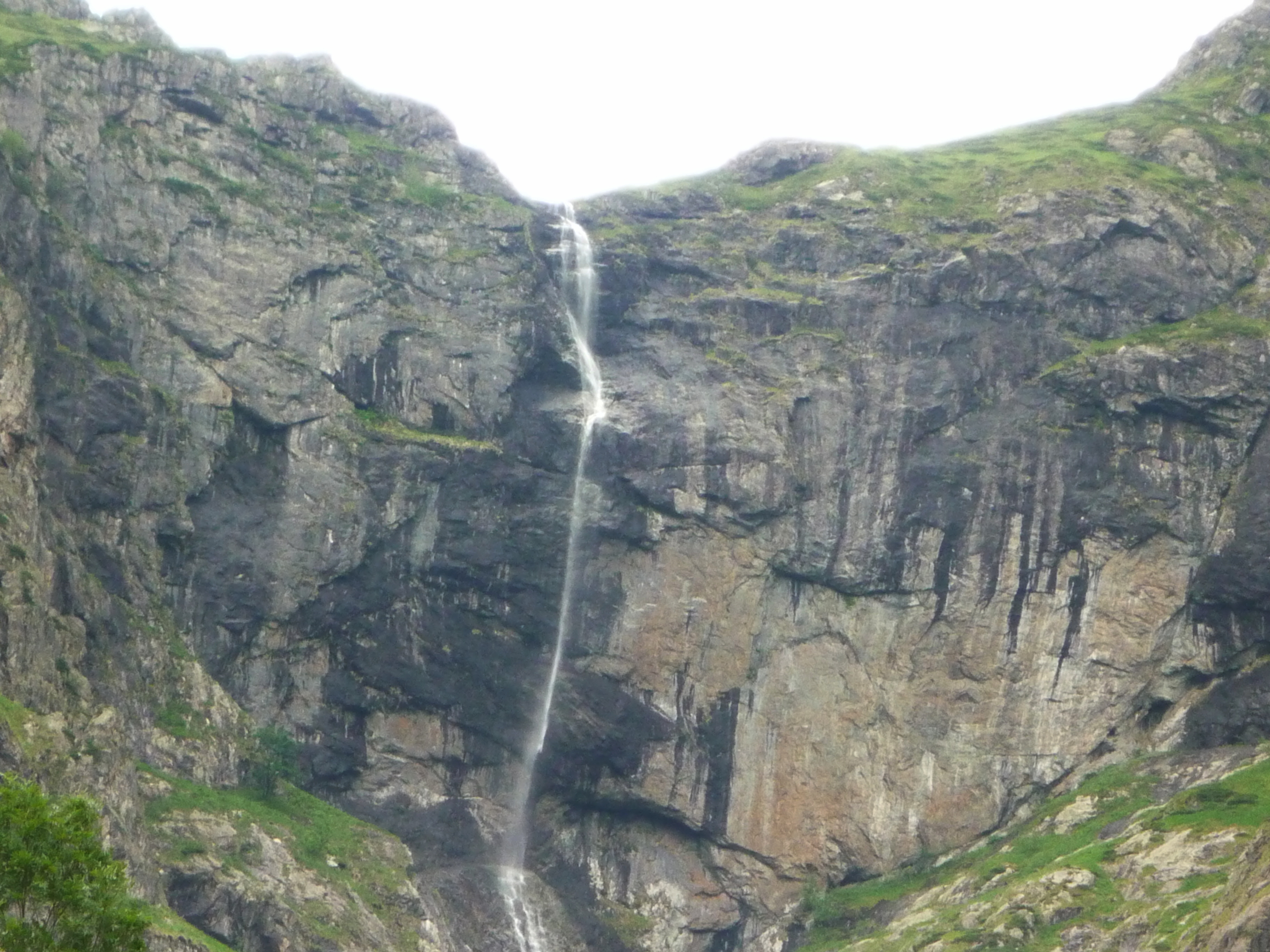
Vidimsko Praskalo Waterfall

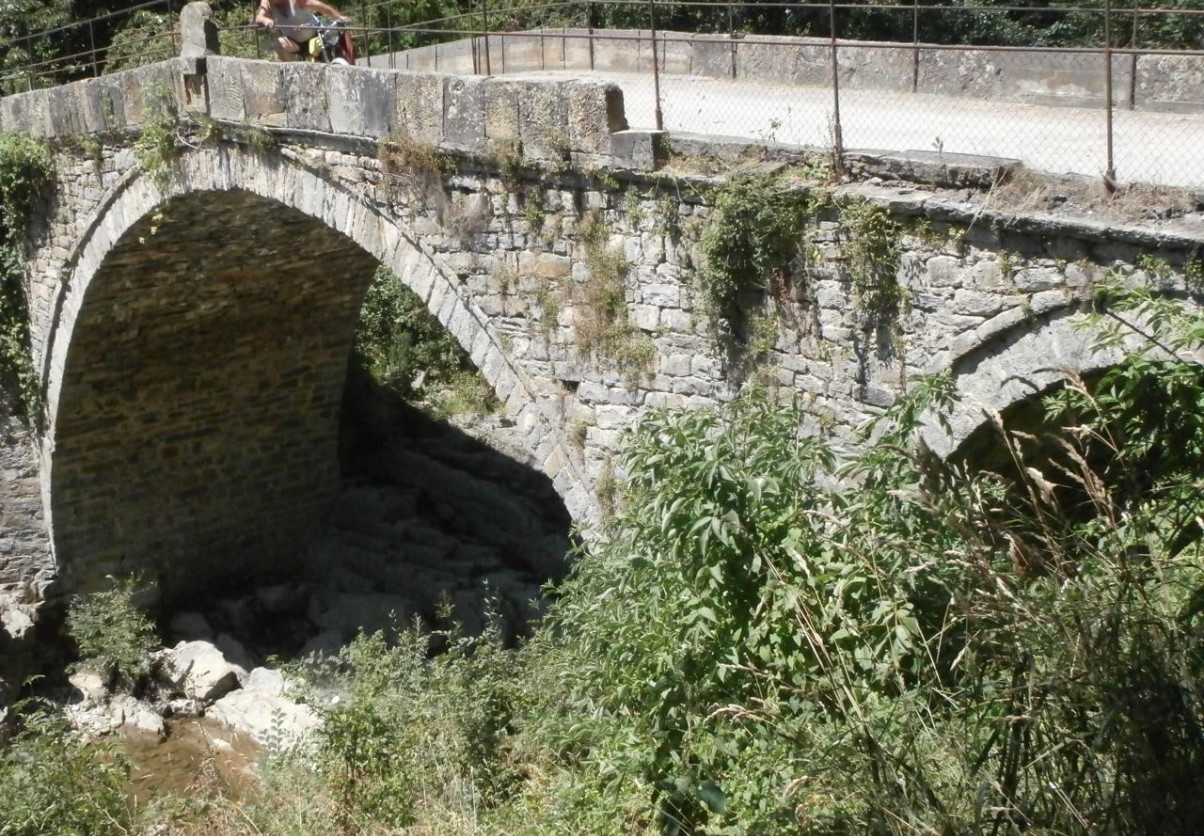
A stone bridge over the river
