= Drivenik Castle =

Castle in Croatia

- Gradina Drivenik
- Vinodol, Croatia
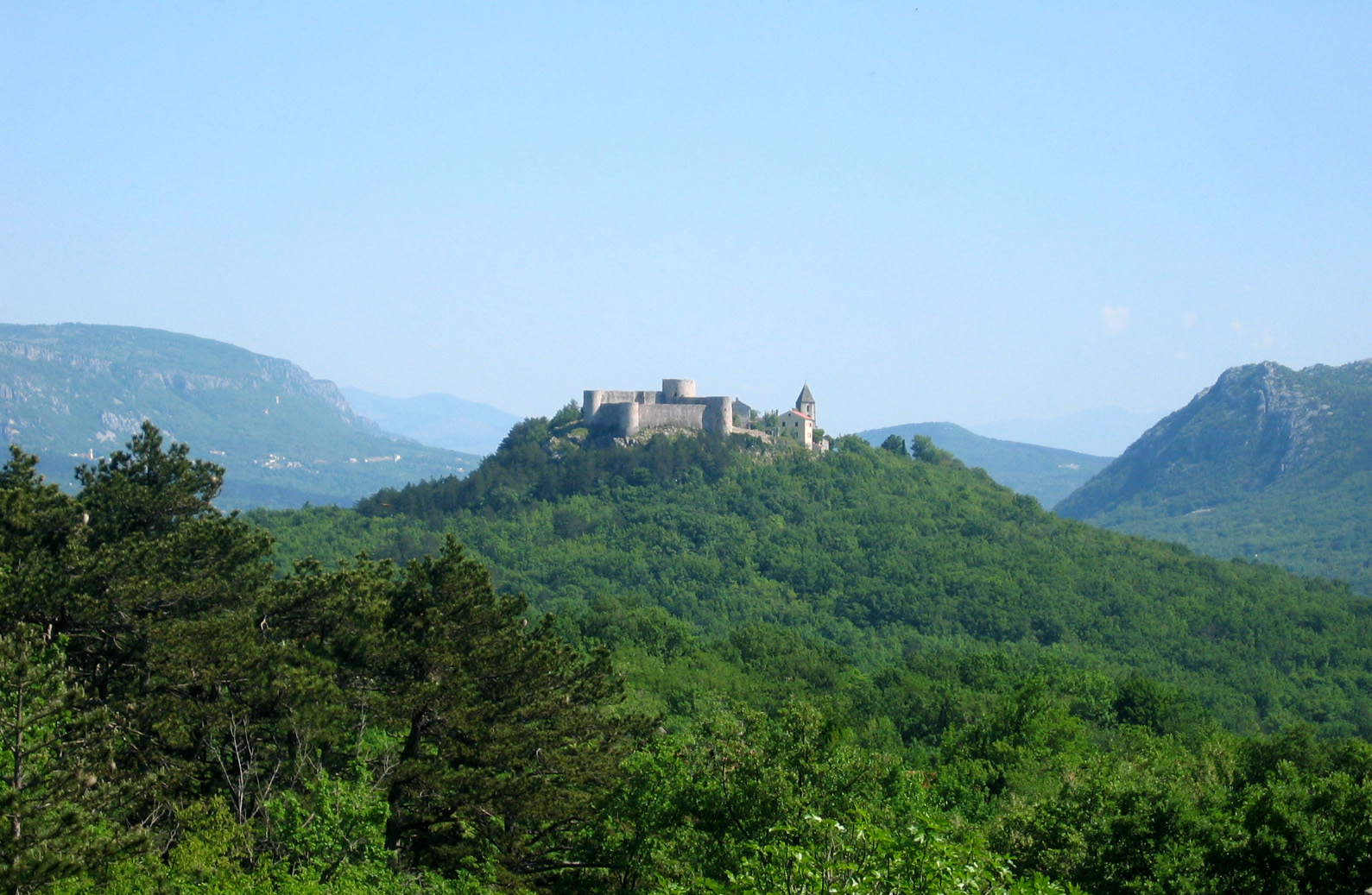

Site information
- Type: Castle
- Condition: Ruins

Location
- Coordinates: 45°14′17″N 14°38′48″E

Site history
- Built: 13th century

Drivenik Castle (Croatian: Gradina Drivenik) is a castle in the hinterland of Crikvenica and Novi Vinodolski, in the northern part of the Adriatic coast, western Croatia.

== History ==
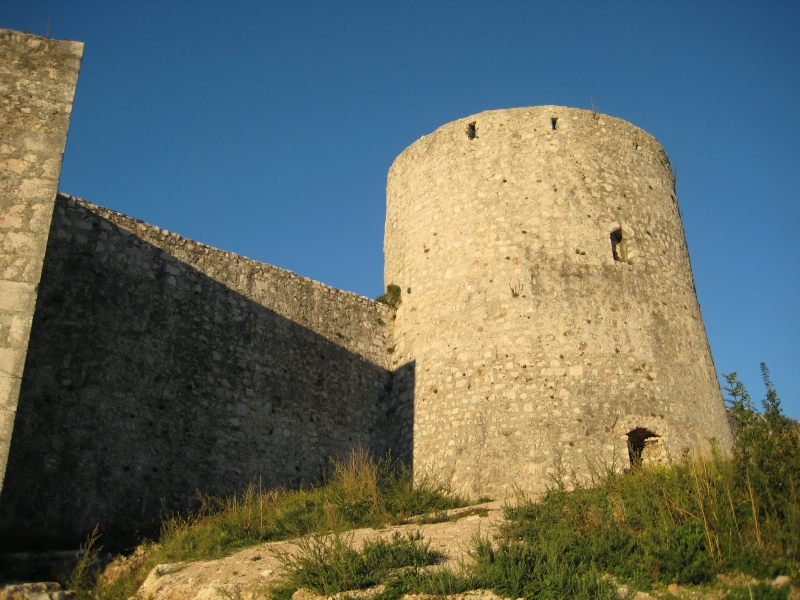
Drivenik Castle

The castle of Drivenik is first mentioned in 1228 as one of the co-signers of the Vinodol Code. It is near the village of Drivenik in the Vinodol region, on a high point named "Glavica", 181 metres (594 ft) above sea level. The castle sits in front of the mountain range called ‘Križišće’ opposite Driveničko polje (Drivenik field). It is in a small village of Drivenik, near a larger village of Tribalj, around 8 kilometres (5 mi) from Crikvenica.

From the 13th century the castle was the seat of the district administration, and upon the arrival of the Frankopans, their deputy Dragoljub resided there in 1288. In the 16th century (1571 based on an inscription on its walls) the castle was expanded in size and in the style of Renaissance fortresses it received round towers on its corners. Then in 1577, the castle was ruled by the noble family Zrinski.

The construction of the road in 1746 linked Drivenik to Novi Vinodolski and Bakar. This allowed the inhabitants to move from the hilltop down into the valley where present day Drivenik village developed along the roadway. Ultimately the castle was abandoned as an active settlement, only the church of Sveti Dujam (St. Domnius) and its cemetery remained as active properties.

Near the castle is the chapel of St. Stephen, built probably at the end of the 16th century with its tower containing three bells. The church has three building phases: Romanesque, Gothic and Baroque. The church originally contained a late Gothic period 'Pieta' sculpture titled the "Mourning of Christ" and a Baroque period wood carved "Golden Altar". Today both are in the Museum of Art and Crafts in Zagreb.

The chapel of St. Martin is situated at the cemetery. It has Baroque frescoes dating from the 18th century. On its wall is a fresco "Taken down from the Cross". There is the Way of the Cross with four shrines near the cemetery and at its end Calvary is marked with three high crosses dating from 1768. The cemetery also contains a monument to fallen fighters from World War II.

The parish church of Sveti Dujam (St. Domnius) contains three naves and a bell-tower in the front. Originally it was built with one nave, without the open bell-tower. Sveti Dujam's bell tower was built in 1806 and the entrance beneath the bell tower was constructed in 1846.

The sanctuary was decorated by Anton Cej in 1894 when the main marble altar was constructed. The church floor contains burial vaults with the remains of a prominent local family Klarić (Gaspar 1653 and Marko 1753). The church underwent partial restoration in 1968.

In the nearby town of Drivenik, a monument has been erected to the famous Croatian miniaturist J.J. Klović (Julio Clovio).

Villages (selo) within Drivenik are named after various local family surnames: Selo Benkovići, Selo Klarići, Selo Jerčinovići, Selo Benići, Selo Šimići, Selo Kružići, Selo Plišići, Selo Petrinovići, Selo Čandrli, Selo Cerovici, Selo Blažići, Selo Ropci, Selo Belobrajići, Selo Klanfari, Selo Goričine, Selo Domijani, Selo Domijančići, Selo Kokanj, and Selo Rudenice.

Between 1871 and 1875, Selce obćina, Grižane obćina, Belgrad obćina, Drivenik obćina, Sveta Jelena obćina and Sveti Jakov obćina were all merged as Grižane-Crkvenica obćina.

== Demographics ==
In 1895, the obćina of Drivenik (court at Drivenik), with an area of 34 square kilometres (13 mi^{2}), belonged to the kotar of Novi (Novi court but Selce electoral district) in the Modruš-Rieka županija (Ogulin court and financial board). There were 462 houses, with a population of 2730. Its 38 villages and 18 hamlets were divided for taxation purposes into 2 porezne obćine, under the Bakar office.

== Governance ==
=== Local ===
Drivenik is the seat of its own local committee.
