= Croatian Natural History Museum =

- Hrvatski prirodoslovni muzej
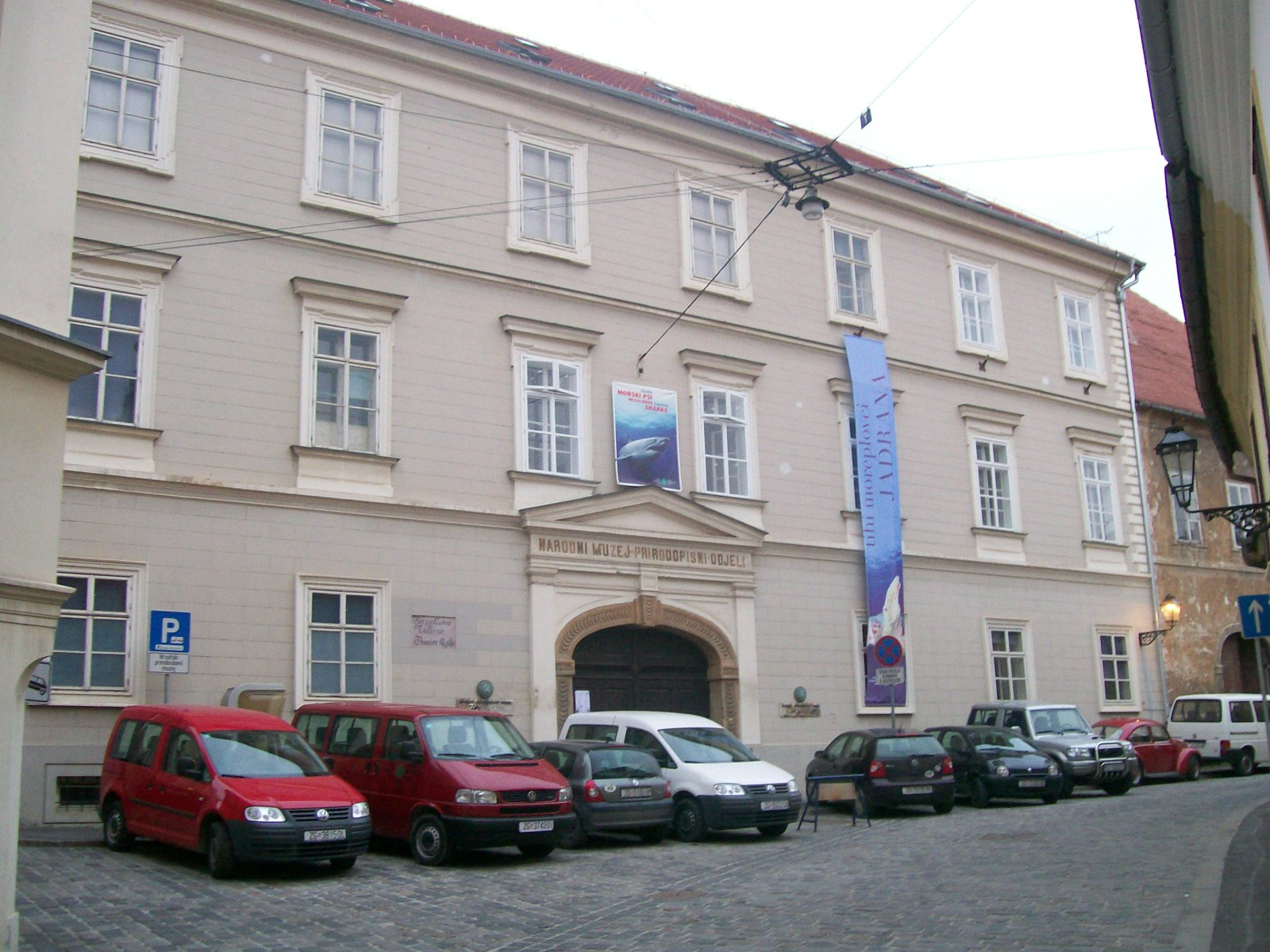
- Entrance to the Croatian Natural History Museum
- Former name: National Museum
- Established: 9 October 1846; 180 years ago
- Location: Demetrova 1, Zagreb, Croatia
- Coordinates: 45°49′02″N 15°58′20″E
- Type: Natural history museum
- Accreditation: Croatian Museum Council
- Key holdings: Krapina remains (Neanderthal)
- Collections: Botanical; Geological-palaeontological; Mineralogical-petrographic; Zoological
- Collection size: 1,4 million
- Visitors: 12,370 (2017)
- Director: Tatjana Vlahović
- Website: hpm.hr

The Croatian Natural History Museum (Croatian: Hrvatski prirodoslovni muzej) is the oldest and biggest natural history museum and the main body for natural history research, preservation and collection in Croatia. Located on Dimitrije Demeter Street in Gornji Grad, one of the oldest neighbourhoods of the Croatian capital Zagreb, it owns one of the biggest museum collections in Croatia, with over 2 million artefacts, including over 1.1 million animal specimens. It was founded in 1846 as the "National Museum". The National Museum was later split up into five museums, three of which were in 1986 merged as departments of the newly named Croatian Natural History Museum. The museum contains a large scientific library open to the public, and publishes the first Croatian natural history scientific journal, Natura Croatica.

The permanent display of the Croatian Natural History Museum consists of mineralogical, petrographical and zoological collections, as well as two permanent exhibits in the atrium: the Rock Map of Croatia and the Geological Pole. It is home to the remains of the Neanderthal from Krapina. In 2021, the museum was closed pending the completion of reconstruction following the 2020 Zagreb earthquake, and then reopened in 2024.

== History ==
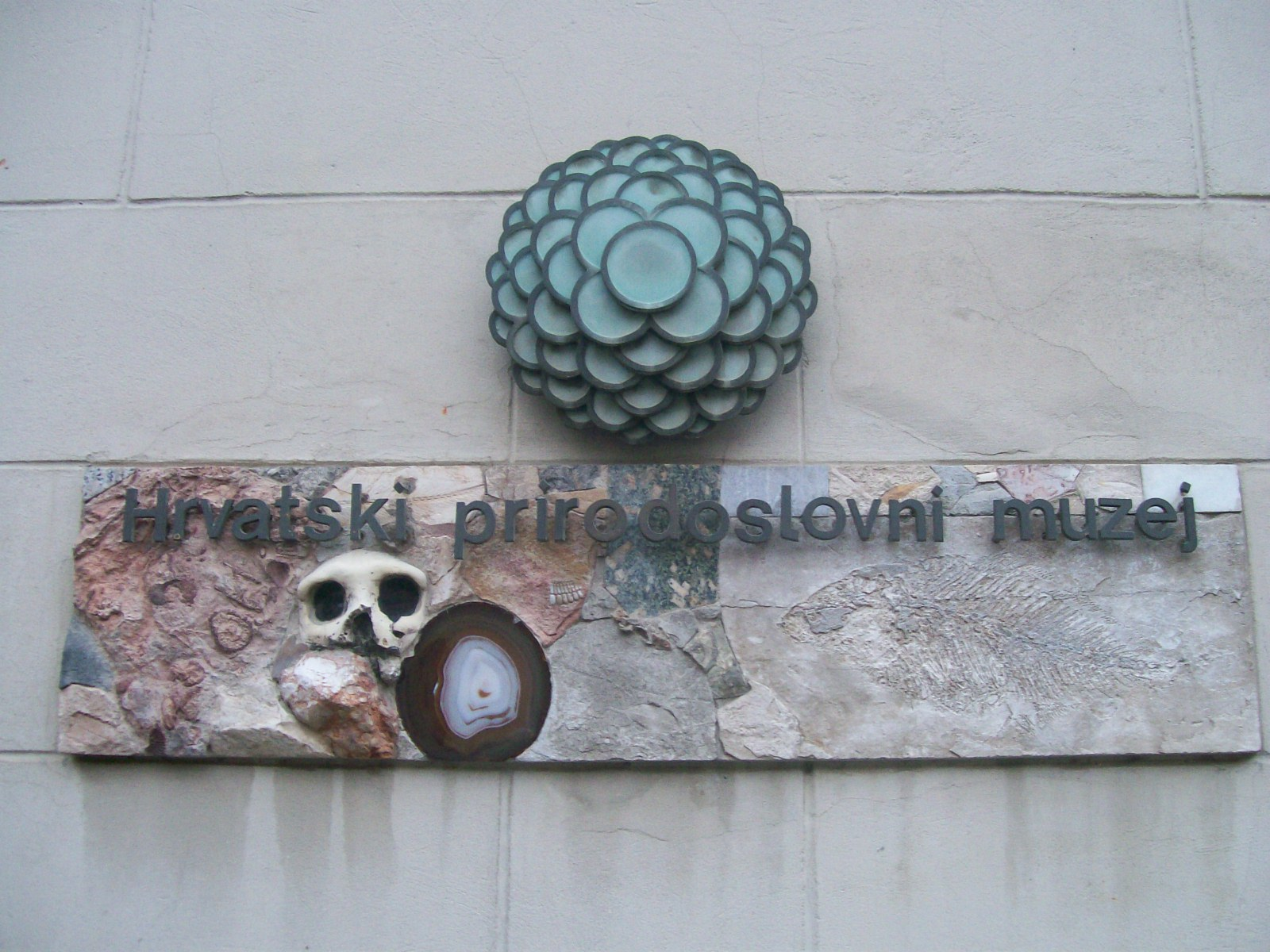
Museum plaque

The history of the Croatian Natural History Museum begins with the founding of the so-called "National Museum" (Narodni muzej) on 10 September 1846, the first museum for historic and pre-historic objects related to Croatia. In 1867, it was moved to its current address. The National Museum grew and was split into five new museums by the end of the 19th century. Three of them covered natural history: the Croatian National Zoological Museum (Hrvatski narodni zoološki muzej), the Geological–Palaeontological Museum (Geološko-paleontološki muzej) and the Mineralogical–Petrographic Museum (Mineraloško-petrografski muzej). All three were housed in the same building on Demeter Street 1, and, in 1986, united into the Croatian Natural History Museum.

The museum's current building, the Amadeo Palace, was earlier home to Amadeo's theatre, the first theatre in Zagreb. Formed in 1797 by Antal Amade de Varkony, the prefect of Zagreb County, it operated until 1834. In 2000, Amadeo's theatre was revived as a yearly summer series of theatrical plays entitled Scena Amadeo ("Amadeo Scene") held in the museum atrium.

Despite a recent renovation, the museum building was severely damaged in the 2020 Zagreb earthquake and was provisionally declared unfit for use. Many exhibits were damaged or destroyed in the earthquake. In late 2020, the museum holdings were moved to a specialised storage building, pending the completion of repairs to the Amadeo Palace. As of March 2021, the completion and reopening of the museum is scheduled for late 2023.

== Library ==
The museum is home to a large scientific library open to the public. Its oldest books were printed in 17th-century Italy, and includes works by Ulisse Aldrovandi, Niccolò Gualtieri and Carl Linnaeus. The library was founded in 1868 by a newly appointed museum director, Spiridon Brusina. Starting from a meager corpus acquired from the National Library, including only three books on zoology, Brusina traveled throughout then-Austria-Hungary in order to acquire books. In 1875, the museum acquired the large library and natural history collection of Francesco Lanza, a physician and archaeologist from Split, Croatia. Brusina retired in 1901, reporting a collection 1,800 works in 3,948 volumes three years earlier. In 1928, it was recorded that the library held 5,838 books in 9,901 volumes. As the library was not professionally maintained during the Croatian War of Independence or inventoried since, it is not known how many titles it holds. A 1999 estimate is 30,000 volumes and 13,100 monographs.

== Journals ==
In 1885, Brusina led a successful initiative to publish The Journal of the Croatian Natural History Society (Glasnik Hrvatskoga naravoslovnoga družtva). The journal is published since 1972 under the title Periodicum biologorum, and focuses on biology and biomedicine, forestry and biotechnology. In 1992, the museum began publishing Natura Croatica, a peer-reviewed biological and geological academic journal. The natural history journal was the first of its kind in Croatia, despite the existence of seven natural history museums. The journal is published quarterly in English, and reviewed by both Croatian and foreign scholars.

== Holdings ==
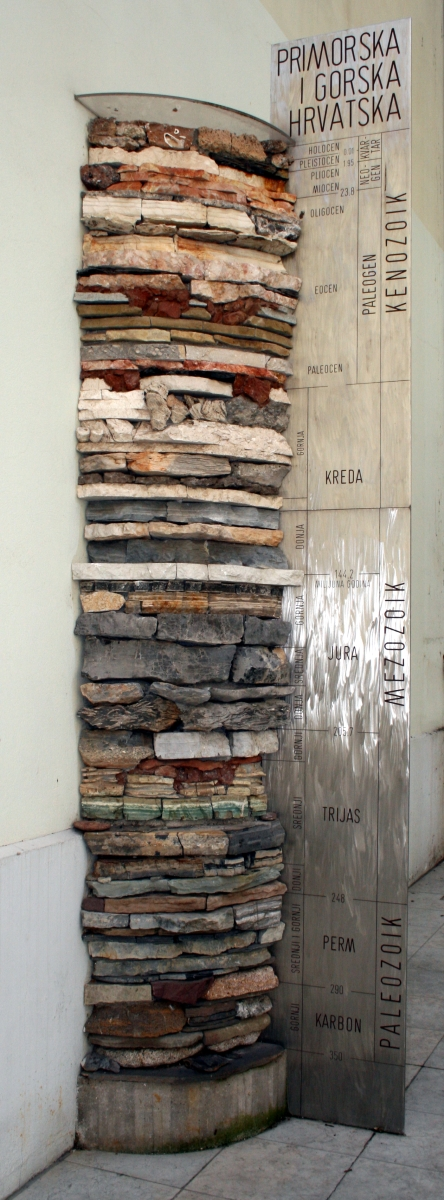
Rock samples from Littoral Croatia and Gorski Kotar region arranged by age

The museum is divided into Mineralogical–Petrographical, Geological–Palaeontological, Zoological and Botanical Departments. The first three are successors to the National Museum's 19th-century offspring museums, while the Botanical Department was established in 1990.

The museum's holdings number over 2 million rocks, minerals, fossils, and other artefacts collected all over the country. The zoological collection consists of 1,135,000 animal specimens, including a tissue bank for DNA analysis. It also holds the remains of the Neanderthal man found near Krapina by Dragutin Gorjanović-Kramberger, a former director of the National Museum. The original remains are held in the museum's vault, while a replica is being exhibited in the Krapina museum.

The museum's permanent display encompasses mineralogical and petrographical collections, as well as a collection of animals, the bulk of which dates back to the 19th century. The zoological collection is on the second floor of the museum. It includes the skeleton of a Mediterranean monk seal, a basking shark native to the Adriatic Sea and an Atlantic puffin, a bird today native to the Arctic area, which is believed to have nested in the Adriatic in the 19th century.

The mineralogical and petrographical collections are divided into three exhibitions. "From a Collection to a Museum" (Od zbirke do muzeja) showcases the work of Croatian mineralogists and petrographers through history, including a geological map of Moslavačka gora in central Croatia by Ljudevit Vukotinović, as well as the work of Đuro Pilar, one of the first Croatian academic geologists. "The Empire of Minerals" (Carstvo minerala) displays a collection of minerals assembled by location of discovery, including collections of agate from Lepoglava and opal, gemstones rare in Croatia. "Rocky Planet Earth" (Stjenoviti planet Zemlja) is organized by rock types, and also contains meteorites, lava from Vesuvius and speleothems. In 2014, the exhibitions were made accessible to blind people.

The atrium of the museum contains two exhibits: the Rock Map of Croatia (Kamenospisna karta Hrvatske) and the Geological Pole (Geološki stup). The Rock Map of Croatia is a mosaic map assembled from various pieces of rock found in Croatia into the country's shape.

== Exhibitions ==
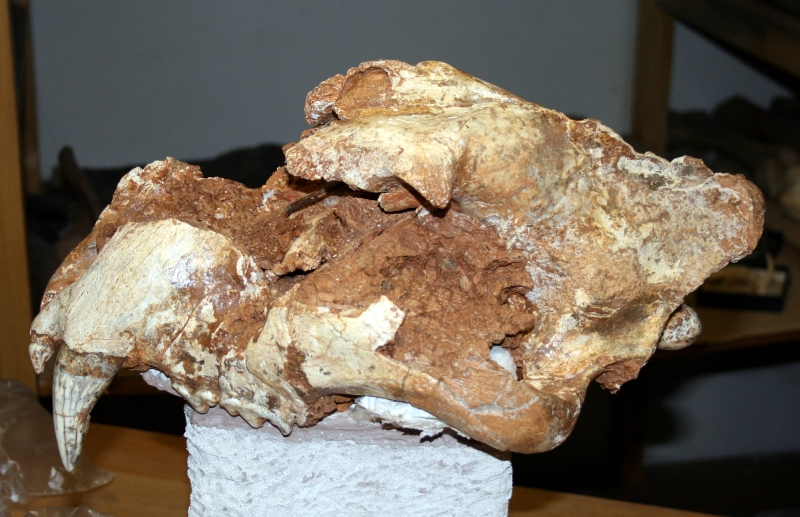
Skull of a cave lion, exhibited in the Croatian Natural History Museum

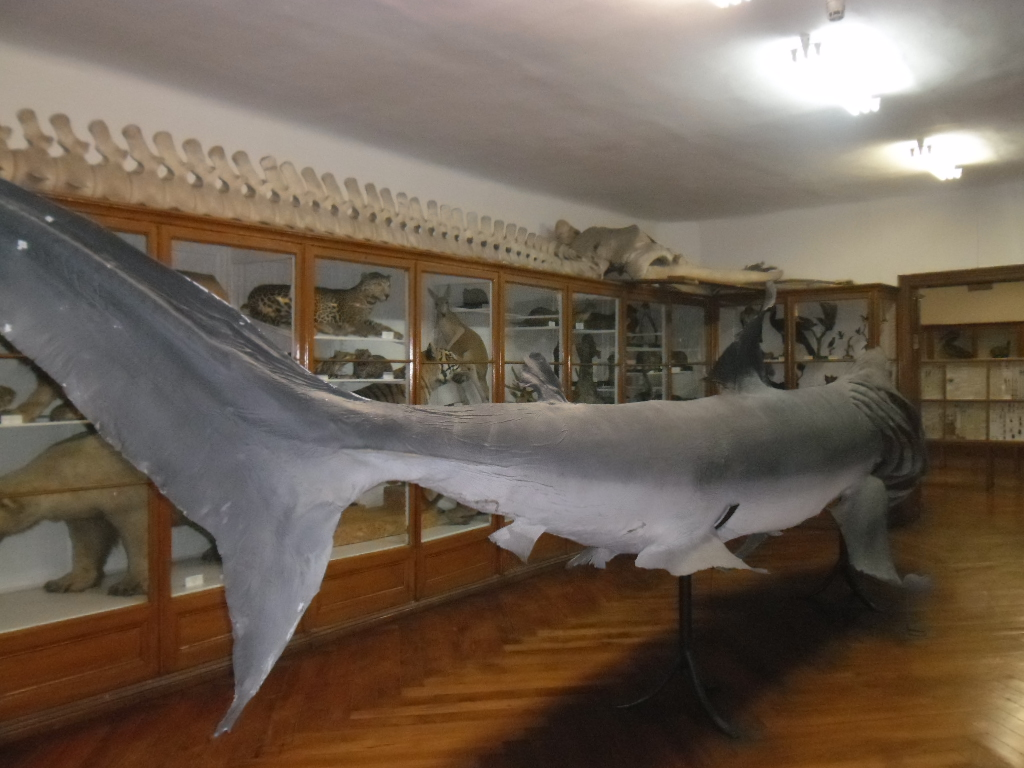
Permanent exhibition

Exhibitions at the Croatian Natural History Museum have included "Dormice: in Biology and the Kitchen" and "Lion's Pit", exhibiting the remains of a cave lion (Panthera leo spelaea), found deep in Vrtare Male, a pit cave near Dramalj, Croatia. With a body length of 3.6 metres (12 ft), the lion was at the time of discovery claimed to be one of the biggest found in the world thus far. Another notable exhibition displayed the reconstruction of a megalodon, an extinct giant shark found in the plains of northern Croatia, where the Paratethys ocean once stood. The museum held the first moss animal exhibition in the world in 2006, entitled "Neptune's Lace". In 2009, visitors had the opportunity to view crocodile fossils from the island Pag, while eighty live snakes owned by the Slovenian breeder Aleš Mlinar were exhibited in 2013.

The museum takes part in the Croatian Museum Night (Noć muzeja), an annual event whereby the public is allowed free entrance to many museums in Croatia during one night in the year. In the 2014 event, the museum was visited by more than 11,000 people.

== See also ==
- List of museums in Croatia
