= Amadeo Theatre and Music Company =

Theatre and Music Company

Coordinates: 45°49′02″N 15°58′22″E

Amadeo Theatre and Music Company started its activities in the summer of 2000 in the atrium of the Croatian Natural History Museum at Upper Town in Zagreb, Croatia. Between 1797 and 1834, that same building was the founding place of the first Croatian public theatre called Amadeo's theatre, named after its founder, the Hungarian count Anton Amade de Varkony, who was also a notable county prefect of Zagreb. In the period between 2006 and 2009, the company was placed in the Museum of Arts and Crafts, Zagreb. In the summer of 2010, it relocated back to the atrium of the Croatian Natural History Museum.

Amadeo Theatre and Music Company is the only polyvalent summer scene in Zagreb with its program going on from July until September. Overall, during one summer there are about 50 plays, concerts and film events with the participation of renowned Croatian and foreign artists.

== Programme ==
The programme of Amadeo Theatre and Music Company consists of a musical and a theatrical part. In the musical part, Amadeo houses classical music concerts, with great emphasis on the participation of young talented musicians, jazz, world music and popular music. In the theatrical part, there are premieres and re-runs of chamber plays, ballet, monodrama and stand-up comedy. Besides the main program, Amadeo Theatre and Music Company runs theatrical program for pre-school and primary school children called 'Little Amadeo', and the alternative stage dedicated to unconventional and amateur art forms called 'Amadeoff Festival'.

== Other programs ==
In the seasons from 2002 until 2005, 12 works of Croatian contemporary composers have been premiered.

In the seasons of 2001 and 2007 Amadeo has displayed a range of movies from the Motovun Film Festival.

From the season of 2006 up until today, Amadeo arranges performances of works by Croatian composers presented by chamber bands and orchestras.

From the season of 2007 up until today, Amadeo has been cooperating with the Jewish Community of Zagreb within the program of the Israel week.

In the season of 2010, Amadeo has displayed a range of movies from the Pula Film Festival.

== Projects ==
Situated in the historic site of the Croatian Natural History Museum, Amadeo Theatre and Music Company has given a number of contributions to its revitalization.

In 2001, on the facade of the building of the Croatian Natural History Museum in Zagreb, Amadeo Theatre and Music Company revealed a memorial with a historic bilingual name from the beginning of the 19th century: Kazaliscna Vulicza – Theater Gasse (Theatre Street).

In 2003, Amadeo Theatre and Music Company refurbishes the derelict atrium of the Croatian Natural History Museum guided by the idea of the museum adviser Jakov Radovcic. The “Kamenopisna karta Hrvatske” (a map of Croatia made out of stone tiles) dominates in the newly refurbished atrium. The map is made out of 2500 stone tiles of Croatian stone, collected in situ from all over Croatia, and the atrium itself is covered in characteristic Croatian stone. There is also a unique geological pillar in the atrium, floor and side illumination by the idea of maestro Ivo Pogorelic.

== Programme board ==
The founders of the Amadeo Theatre and Music Company are: Nenad Jandric, Rada Vnuk, Zvonimir Zoricic, Bozidar Oreskovic (1942–2010), Neven Franges and August Faulend Heferer.

Today, Program board of the Amadeo Theatre and Music Company has the following members: Nenad Jandric (director), Rada Vnuk, Jakov Jandric, August Faulend Hefere and Izabela Simunovic (1970–2010).

== List of premiered works by contemporary Croatian composers ==
- Stanko Horvat (2002) Dah i dodir, for oboe, clarinet, bassoon and piano
- Sanda Majurec-Zanata (2002) Four for two for two violins
- Berislav Sipus (2002) Dies irae, for a brass quintet
- Sanja Drakulic (2003) Limeni stavak, piece for a brass quintet
- Olja Jelaska (2003) Kaleidoskop, for flute, clarinet, two violins, viola and a violoncello
- Ivana Kis (2003) Parasax, for a saxophone quartet
- Mladen Tarbuk (2004) Cetiri jahača i dva proroka, for organ and percussions
- Kresimir Seletkovic (2004) Vertigo, for a brass quintet
- Davor Bobic (2004) Drevne zagorske fanfare, for a trombone quartet
- Antun Tomislav Saban (2005) Plavo-Crveno-Zuto, for a painter (Dusko Sibl) and a chamber ensemble
- Sanja Drakulic (2005) Portreti, for the Croatian brass quintet
- Dubravko Palanovic (2005) Gudacki kvartet, for a painter (Izabela Simunović) and a string quartet
