= Grižane-Belgrad =

Village in Croatia

- Village
- Location within Croatia
- Coordinates: 45.202411°N 14.718471°E

Area
  - Total: 56.4 km^{2} (21.8 sq mi)

Population (2021)
  - Total: 818
  - Density: 14.5/km^{2} (37.6/sq mi)

Grižane-Belgrad is a village in Primorje-Gorski Kotar County of Croatia. It is located near Crikvenica and Novi Vinodolski. It has a population of 953 (census 2011) and the post code HR-51244.

The modern-day settlement includes the former villages Grižane and Belgrad, and numerous nearby hamlets.

The Grižane Castle overlooks the village.

== History ==
Between 1871 and 1875, Selce obćina, Grižane obćina, Belgrad obćina, Drvenik obćina, Sveta Jelena obćina and Sveti Jakov obćina were all merged as Grižane-Crkvenica obćina.

== Demographics ==
In 1895, the obćina of Grižane-Belgrad (court at Grižane), with an area of 61 square kilometres (24 mi^{2}), belonged to the kotar of Novi (Novi court but Selce electoral district) in the Modruš-Rieka županija (Ogulin court and financial board). There were 711 houses, with a population of 4100. Its 23 villages and 14 hamlets were divided for taxation purposes into 2 porezne obćine, under the Bakar office.

== Governance ==
=== Local ===
It is the seat of its own local committee.

== Notable people ==
- Giulio Clovio
