= Selce, Croatia =

Coordinates: 45°09′18″N 14°43′16″E

Selce
- Village
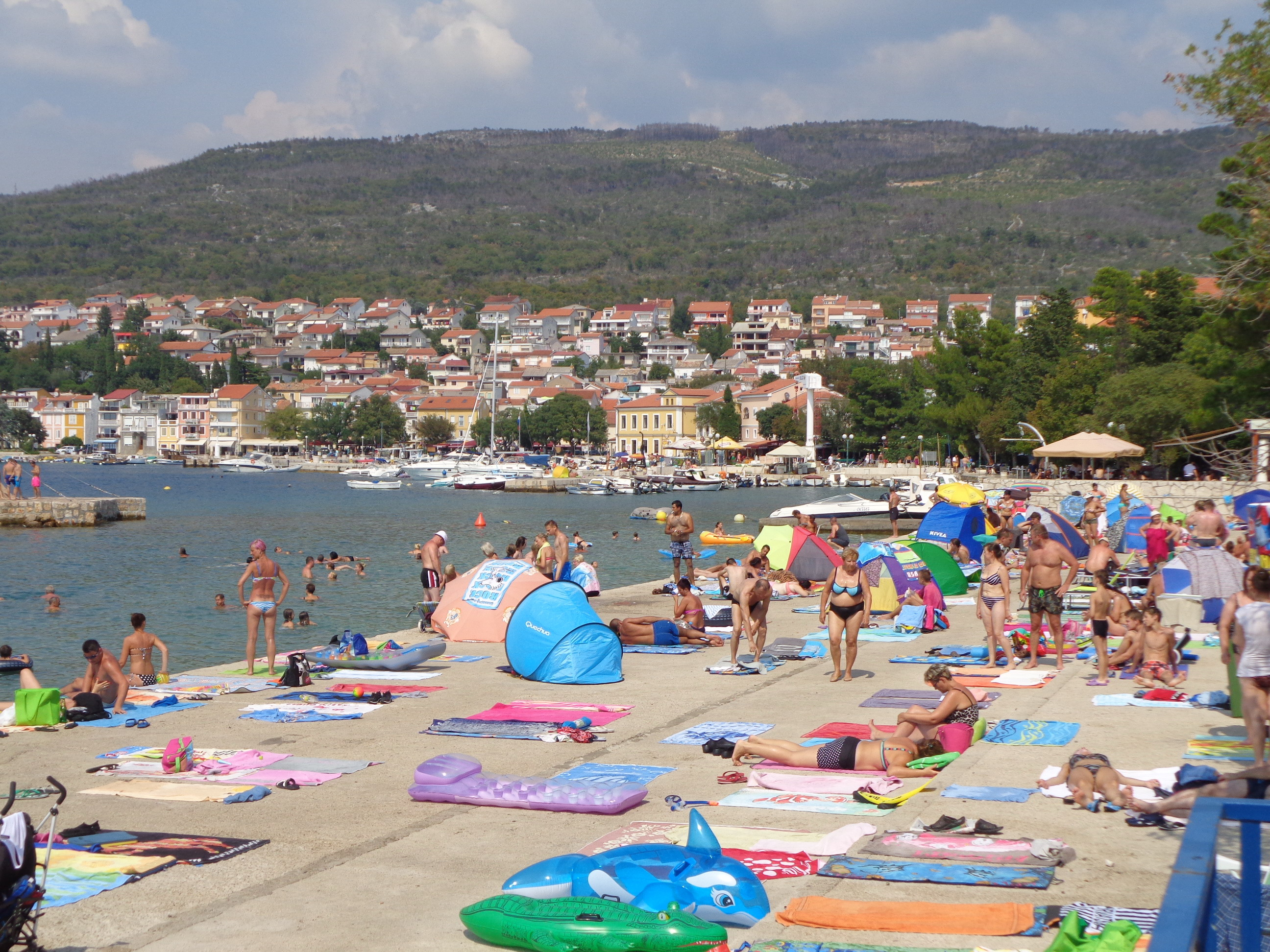
- beach in Selce
- Interactive map of Selce
- Country: Croatia

Area
  - Total: 2.7 sq mi (7.0 km^{2})

Population (2021)
  - Total: 1,298
  - Density: 480/sq mi (190/km^{2})
- Time zone: UTC+1 (CET)
  - Summer (DST): UTC+2 (CEST)
- Website: www.holidayincroatia.net

Selce is a resort village in Croatia. It is a popular destination in Northern Croatia, both with Croatian and international tourists especially in the summer due to its mild Mediterranean climate. Selce also has an important rehabilitation centre – treatment centre for people with rheumatic, respiratory and physical disabilities.

== History ==
In the 13th century, as part of the old Croatian municipality of Bribir, Selce came into the possession of the Frankopan family. This event significantly influenced the development of Selce as a trading town.

Between 1871 and 1875, Selce obćina, Grižane obćina, Belgrad obćina, Drvenik obćina, Sveta Jelena obćina and Sveti Jakov obćina were all merged as Grižane-Crkvenica obćina.

The last two days of November 2008, the maximum wave height as recorded at nearby Bakar reached a record. Little rain fell, but the city was flooded anyway thanks to a strong sirocco wind. Firefighters had to pump water from basements and the HEP had to repair broken power lines. Some of the Selce's beaches lost all their sand during the storm.

On 16 September 2017, the Dubračina and Suha Ričina Novljanska streams overflowed, flooding Selce, Crikvenica and Novi Vinodolski. This was after 183 millimetres (7.2 in) of rain fell by 6:00.

=== 2012 Crikvenica fire ===
In 2012, the most dangerous fire on record in Vinodol, and of the largest, happened near Selce, encompassing 520 hectares (1,300 acres) of mostly forest. At 8:35 on 23 July, smoke was noticed in Jargovo uphill from Selce. Att 8:36, the DVD Bribir left to fight it, and at 8:38 the JVP Grada Crikvenice joined them. At 8:50, the commander of the JVP declared the 2nd degree of the Operative Plan (Croatian: drugi stupanj Operativnog plana), mobilising in addition to the aforementioned the DVD "San Marino" Novi Vinodolski. At 9:15, this was increased to the 3rd degree by the Županija commander. By 9:30, there were 87 firefighters and 16 vehicles on the scene.

Carried by a powerful bura, the fire reached the residential area Studenčić above the D8, triggering active defence of the Rabkomerc and DPD auto service buildings together with adjacent buildings, but the fire spread across the D8 anyway around 10:00.

It took a total of 550 firefighters, 105 vehicles, 47 foresters and so on, to stop put the fire out on the 24th.

== Demographics ==
In 1895, the obćina of Selce (court at Selce), with an area of 6.9872 square kilometres (2.6978 mi^{2}), belonged to the kotar of Novi (Novi court but Selce electoral district) in the Modruš-Rieka županija (Ogulin court and financial board). There were 344 houses, with a population of 1445 (the lowest in Novi kotar). Its 3 villages were encompassed for taxation purposes by a single porezna obćina, under the Bakar office.

== Governance ==
=== Local ===
It is the seat of its own local committee.
