= Drashkova Polyana =

Drashkova Polyana Драшкова поляна
- Village
- Location within Bulgaria
- Coordinates: 42.9000°N 24.8000°E
- Country: Bulgaria
- Province: Lovech Province
- Municipality: Apriltsi
- Time zone: UTC+2 (EET)
  - Summer (DST): UTC+3 (EEST)

Drashkova Polyana is a village in Apriltsi Municipality, Lovech Province, northern Bulgaria.
