= Grižane Castle =

Coordinates: 45.129°N 14.835°E

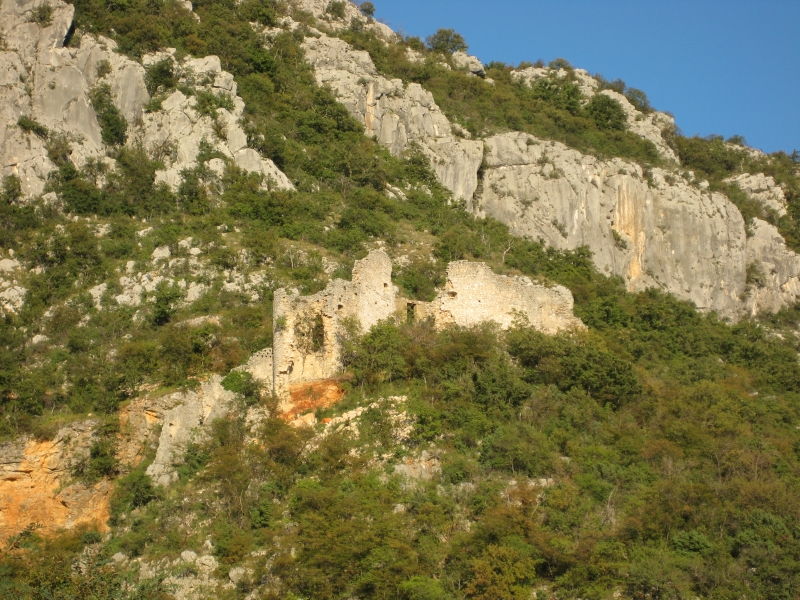
Gradina Grižane

Grižane Castle (Croatian: Gradina Grižane) is a ruined castle and site near Grižane in Vinodol, in the northern part of the Adriatic coast, western Croatia. The castle of Grižane had an odd, rectangular form with circular towers, and this irregularity was due to the construction of the structure on the irregular rocky terrain of a steep hillside.

In the medieval ages it was a strategic point in Vinodol valley, but it was damaged in an earthquake in 1321 or 1323. Its owners were members of the Frankopan family. The castle was first described as a fort in a document in 1449, which describes the division of the Frankopan estates.

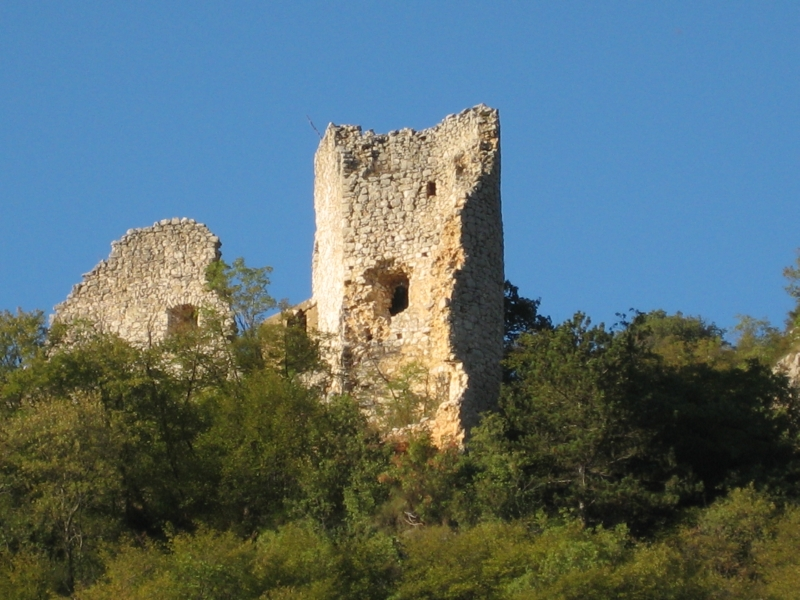
Grižane Castle
