= Milica Mihičić =

Croatian actress (1864–1950)

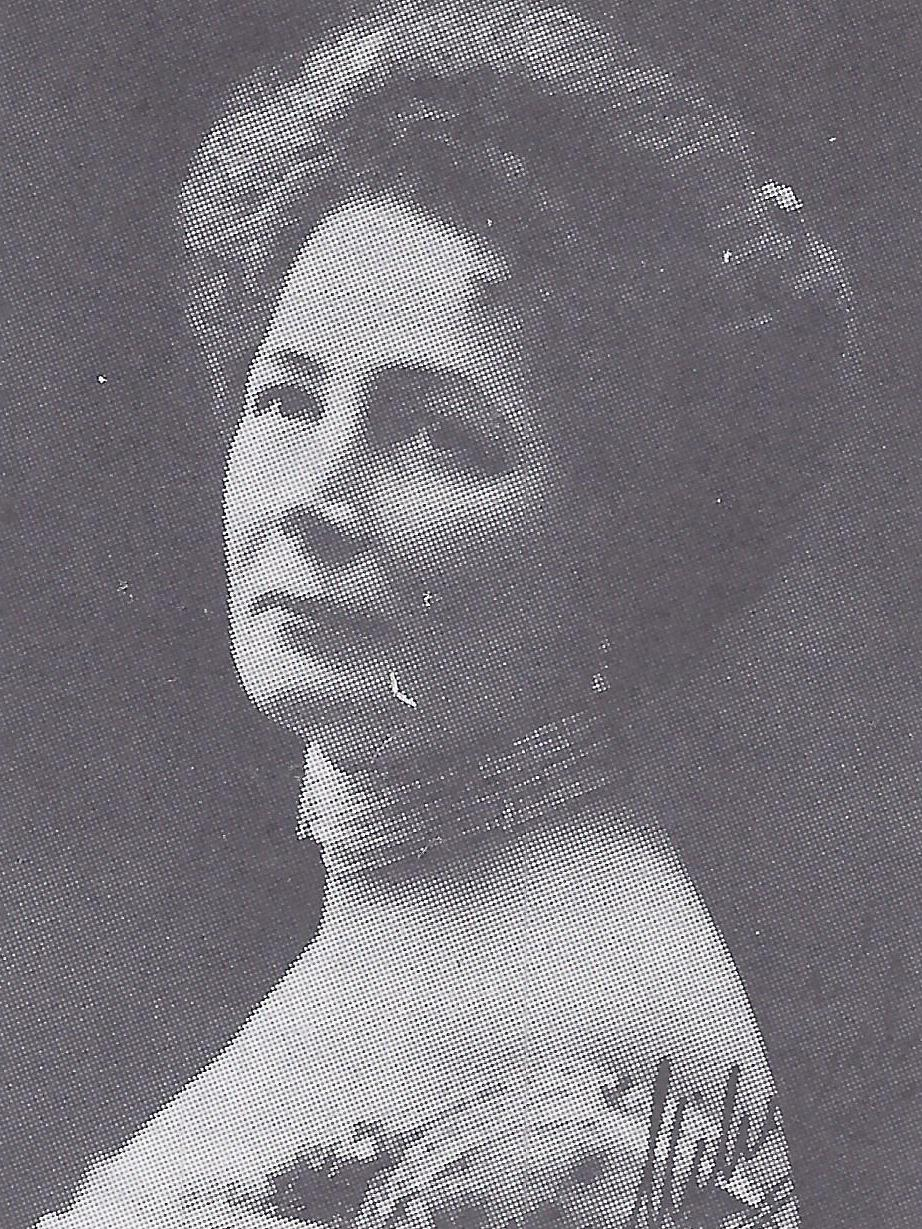
Milica Mihičić

Milica Mihičić (17 January 1864 – 9 February 1950) was a Croatian actress.

Milica Mihičić was born in Crikvenica Croatia. She was schooled at an Italian-language school at the Benedictine nunnery in Rijeka, later received private education. She studied acting in Zagreb and made her debut at the Croatian National Theater in 1890. She stayed with the theater for her whole acting career (part time in later years). Her repertoire included roles of various personal character traits from various strata of society. She was among pioneers of realistic acting in the theatre.

She also taught acting privately and translated plays from French. She acted in two silent films (Dvije sirote (Two Orphans, 1918), Dama sa crnom krinkom (The Lady in the Black Mask, 1918) and in the 1942 documentary Baroque in Cratia (Barok u Hrvatskoj )

She was described as "a highly intelligent actress of suggestive personality, appeared, and for five decades remained the protagonist of the social comedy as well as of a psychological repertoire."

== Commemoration ==
A street in Zagreb bears her name and sculptor Ferdo Ivanščak created a bronze bust of her around 1915.
