= Dramalj =

Coordinates: 45°11′31″N 14°40′05″E

Dramalj Sveta Jelena
- Village
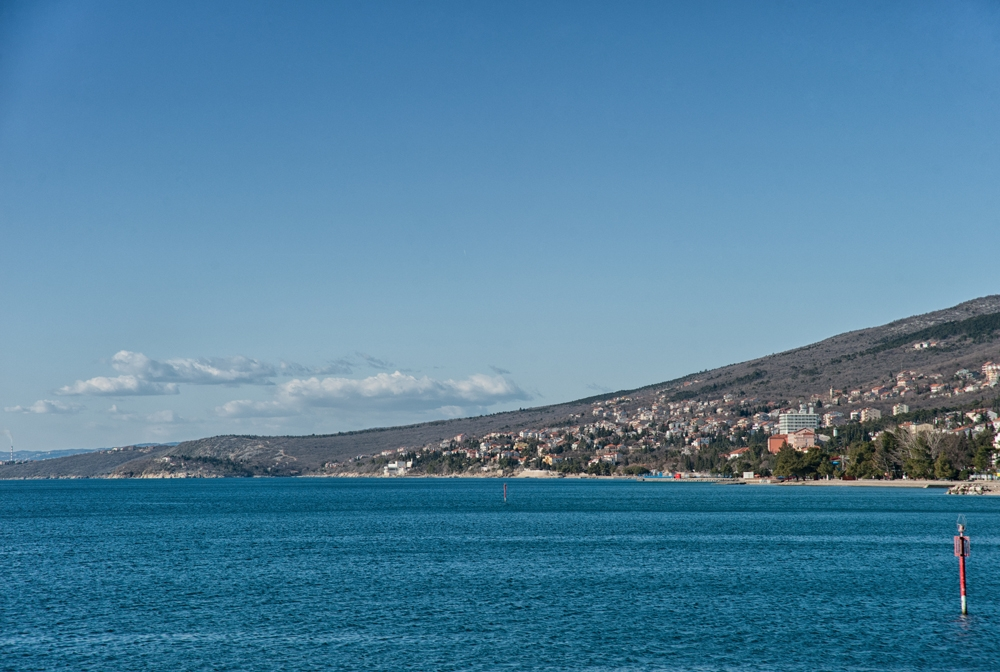
- Dramalj coast
- Interactive map of Dramalj
- Country: Croatia

Area
  - Total: 5.8 km^{2} (2.2 sq mi)

Population (2021)
  - Total: 1,366
  - Density: 240/km^{2} (610/sq mi)
- Time zone: UTC+1 (CET)
  - Summer (DST): UTC+2 (CEST)
- Postal code: 51265
- Area code: 051
- Website: tzm-dramalj.hr

Dramalj is a small fishing village in Croatia. It is part of the town of Crikvenica, extending from the neighborhood Crni mol to the tourist complex Kačjak. A tourism boom in the nearby Crikvenica area and the rest of the Croatian Littoral in the 19th century drove the development of Dramalj.

The village is home to the Dramalj Culture Hall, where traditional carnival feasts are held during the winter.

== History ==
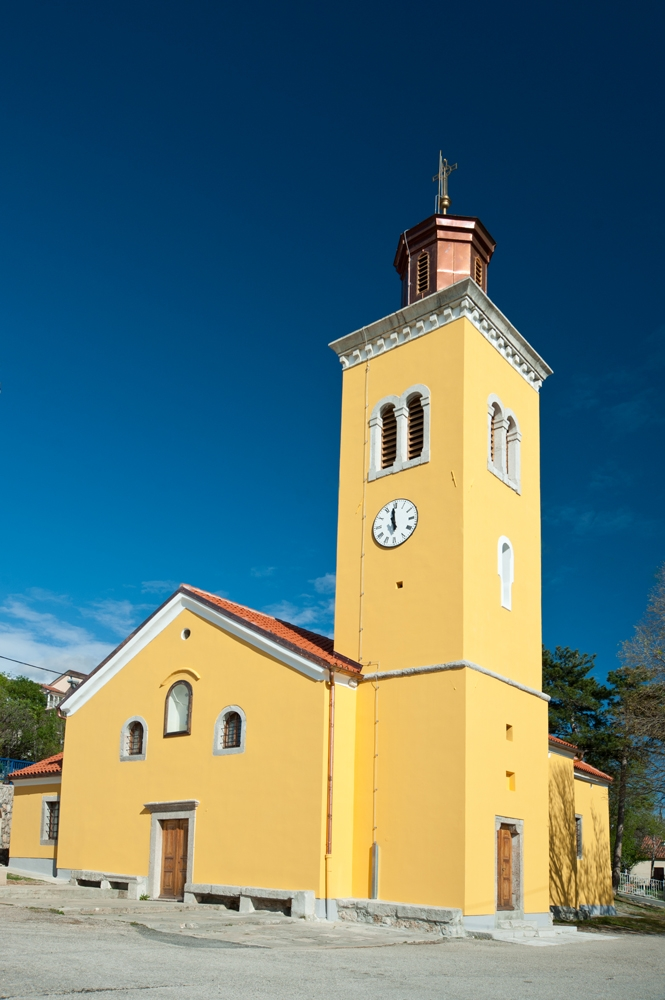
Church of St. Helen

Dramalj was first mentioned in the 18th century, when it was named Zagorje - Dramalj. It began as a fishing port with olive groves, most of which were owned by the inhabitants of Tribalj Valley.

There are ruins of an ancient Liburnian hill fort enclosed with a dry-stone dyke above Dramalj. Amphorae found around the Kačjak Peninsula are evidence of an ancient Roman port located there at the time.

In the Austro-Hungarian times, Dramalj was part of Sveta Jelena County (St. Helen), which was founded in 1809. The parish house and the Church of St. Helen were built after 1812. The church was built on the foundations of an old chapel, when Dramalj belonged to Belgrad parish. G. Capovilla, a stone carver from Rijeka, made the altar in 1796. The construction of the church was financed by the parish and initiated by Mate Balas, then parish priest. The interior of the church was refurbished in the 19th century, the pulpit in 1837 and the main altar in 1845. The name of the village was soon after changed to Sveta Jelena. After the World War II, the former name Dramalj was restored.

Between 1871 and 1875, Selce obćina, Grižane obćina, Belgrad obćina, Drvenik obćina, Sveta Jelena (Dramalj) obćina and Sveti Jakov obćina were all merged as Grižane-Crkvenica obćina.

The Culture Hall is located in the vicinity of the church. In 1939, the building was home to the first public library in Dramalj.

== Climate ==
The North Adriatic, especially in this part of the Quarner Riviera experiences a mild Mediterranean climate with some continental influence. The summers are sunny, dry and hot, while the winters are rainy and relatively mild with characteristic winds. The average annual air temperature is 14.2 °C. The coldest month is January, while the hottest one is July.

Average cloud cover in Dramalj is 0.51 (5.1 tenths of obscured sky), varying from 0.33 to 0.62. Average annual relative humidity is 70%, while the peak rainy period is in October and November. Air pressure averages 761.8 millimetres of mercury (1,015.6 hPa).

Bora and jugo are the predominant winds in the area, while Ostro, maestral and levant are also present. Bora typically blows from November to February, peaking in strength in January, while jugo is most frequently experienced from May to August with the average maximum in July. Ostro, a southern wind, reaches its maximum in November.

The soil in Dramalj area is mostly composed of porous karst (limestone). The sea is shallow, even at a considerable distance from the coast.

== Governance ==
=== Local ===
It is the seat of its own local committee.

== Notable Sites ==
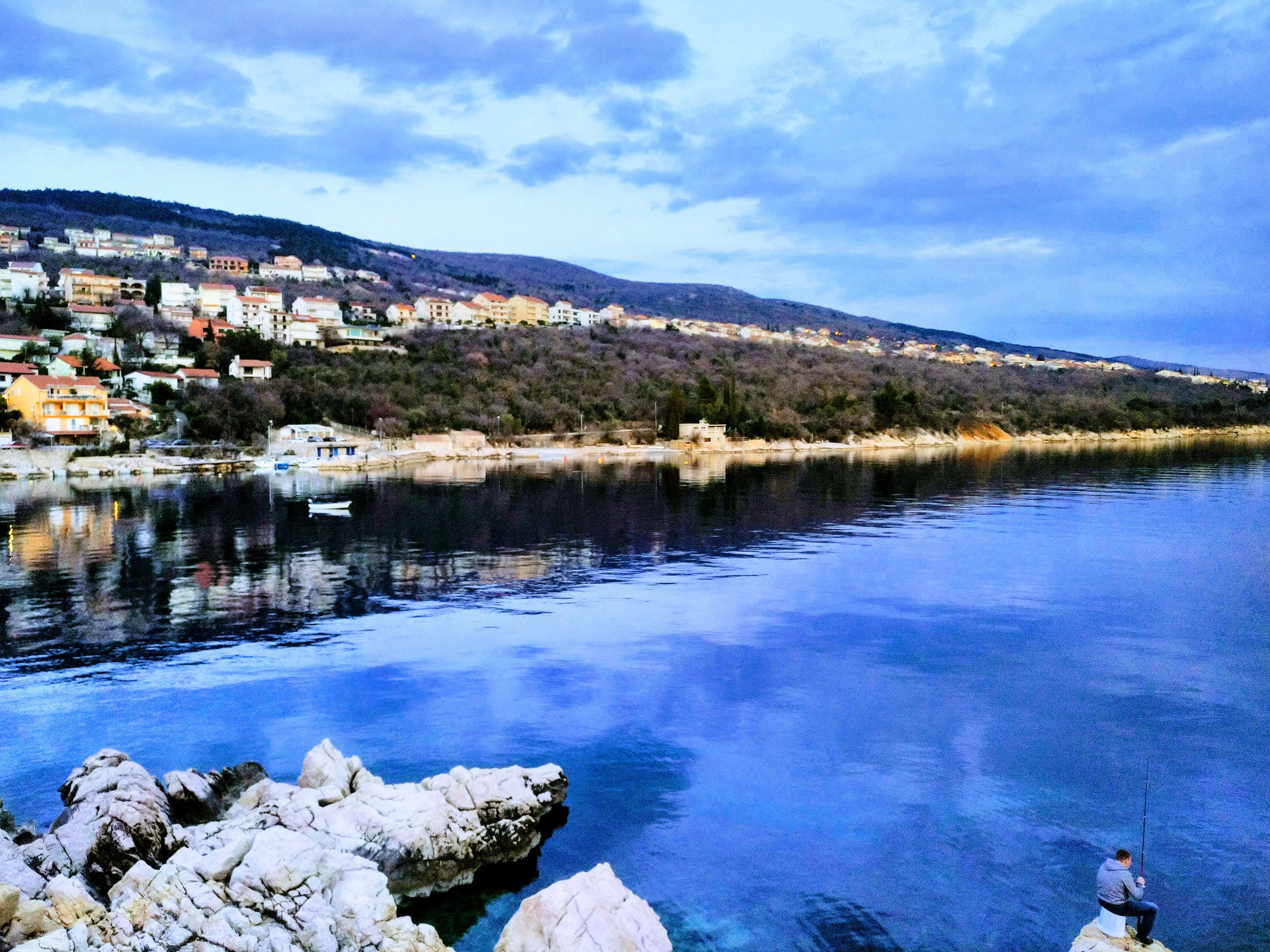
Kačjak

Local attractions in Dramalj include:

- The Dramalj Culture Hall
- Kacjak Beach
- Kacjak East Beach
- Beach Omorika
- Lanterna Beach
- Pazdehova Beach
- Riviera Beach
- Vali Beach

== See also ==
- Vrtare Male
