= Antal Amade de Várkony =

Hungarian count

Antal Amade de Várkony (25 November 1761 – 1 January 1835) was a Hungarian count and notable comes of Zagreb, Croatia, who established the first public theatre in the city of Zagreb in 1797.

== Early life ==
He was born in Böős on 25 November 1761. His father was Count Tádé Amade, (1724–1807), and his mother was the Countess Mária Angélika Nyáry von Bedegh (b. 1734).

== Career ==
He established the first public theatre in the city of Zagreb in 1797, called Amadeo's theatre. It was open until 1834. Amadeo's theatre was situated in the former Blatna (Mud) and Kazalisna (Theatre) Street, which afterwards got the name Demetrova. After closing his theatre, Amade withdrew to his estate in Hungary. The building in which it was situated is now the Croatian Natural History Museum and, from 2000, the home of the Amadeo Theatre and Music Company.

== Personal life ==
Amade de Várkony was married to Anna Mária Esterházy (1745–1830), a daughter of Count Miklós Esterházy von Galántha and Princess Maria Susanna Anna Lubomirska. Together, they were the parents of:

- Ferenc Szerafin Amade de Várkony (1783–1823), who married Josefa von Boymund zu Payrsperg, a daughter of Johann Adam von Boymund zu Payrsperg.
- Antónia Amade de Várkony (b. 1790), who married Francis Taaffe, 8th Viscount Taaffe, son of Rudolph Taaffe, 7th Viscount Taaffe, in 1811.

Amade de Várkony died in Marcaltő on 1 January 1835.
