= Apriltsi Municipality =

Apriltsi Municipality Община Априлци
- Municipality
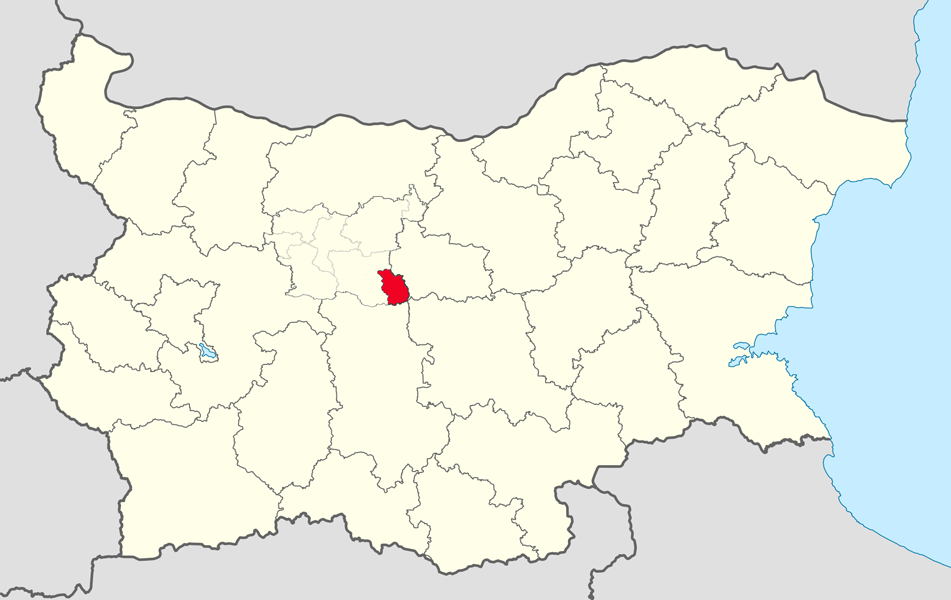
- Apriltsi Municipality within Bulgaria and Lovech Province.
- Coordinates: 42°48′N 24°54′E
- Country: Bulgaria
- Province (Oblast): Lovech
- Admin. centre (Obshtinski tsentar): Apriltsi

Area
  - Total: 240 km^{2} (93 sq mi)

Population (December 2009)
  - Total: 3,554
  - Density: 15/km^{2} (38/sq mi)
- Time zone: UTC+2 (EET)
  - Summer (DST): UTC+3 (EEST)

Apriltsi Municipality (Bulgarian: Община Априлци) is a municipality (obshtina) in Lovech Province, Central-North Bulgaria, located from the northern slopes of the central Stara planina mountain to the area of the Fore-Balkan. It is named after its administrative centre - the town of Apriltsi.

The municipality embraces a territory of 240 km^{2} (93 sq mi) with a population of 3,554 inhabitants, as of December 2009.

The area covers parts of the Central Balkan National Park which is listed as Category 2 by The World Conservation Union (IUCN).

== Settlements ==
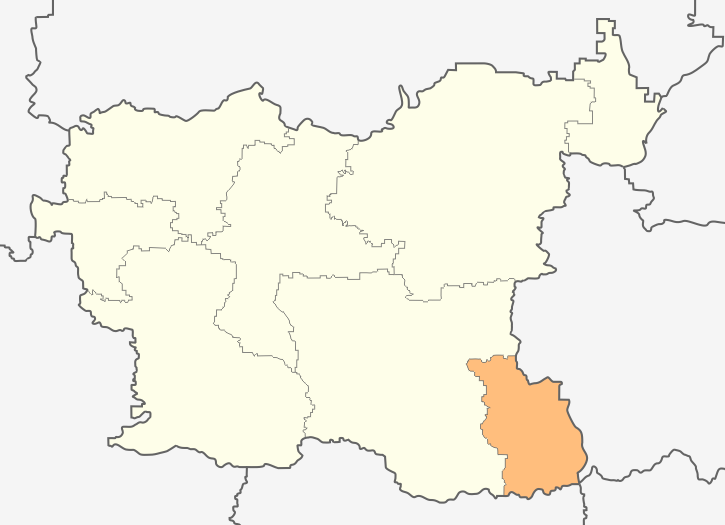
Apriltsi Municipality within Lovech Province

Apriltsi Municipality includes the following 4 places (towns are shown in bold):

Town/Village	Cyrillic	Population (December 2009)
**Apriltsi**	**Априлци**	3,207
Drashkova Polyana	Драшкова поляна	101
Skandaloto	Скандалото	67
Velchevo	Велчево	179
Total		3,554

== Demography ==
The following table shows the change of the population during the last four decades.

Apriltsi Municipality
**Year**	1975	1985	1992	**2001**	2005	2007	2009	**2011**
**Population**	6,203	5,313	4,720	4,137	3,788	3,647	3,554	...
Sources: Census 2001, Census 2011, „pop-stat.mashke.org“,

=== Religion ===
According to the latest Bulgarian census of 2011, the religious composition, among those who answered the optional question on religious identification, was the following:

Religious composition of Apriltsi Municipality
Orthodox Christianity	96.8%
Catholicism	0.4%
Protestantism	0.0%
Islam	0.2%
No religion	1.2%
Prefer not to answer, others and indefinable	1.4%

== See also ==
- Provinces of Bulgaria
- Municipalities of Bulgaria
- List of cities and towns in Bulgaria
