= Crikvenica =

- Town
- Grad Crikvenica; Town of Crikvenica
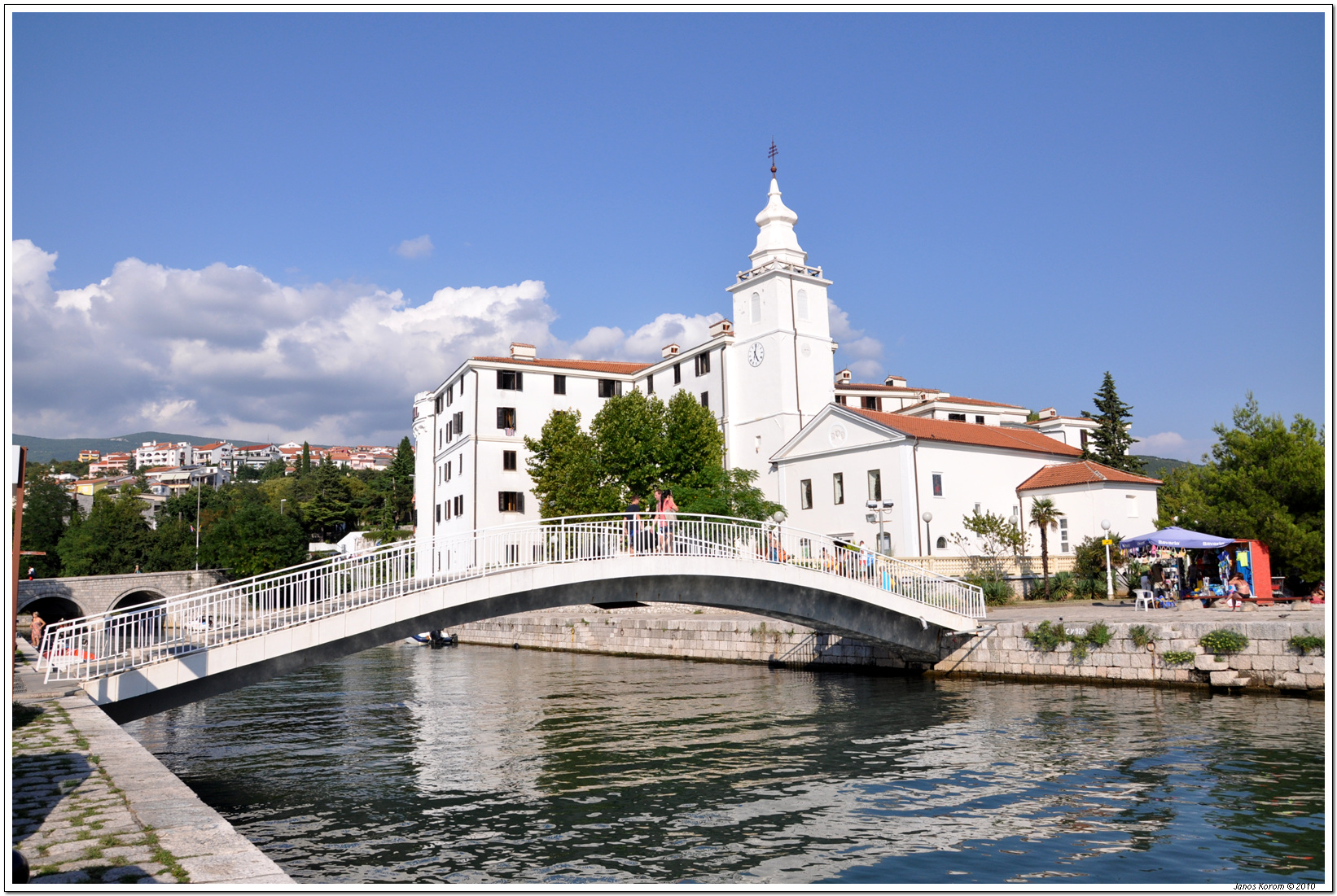
- Crikvenica
- Interactive map of Crikvenica
- Location of Crikvenica within Croatia
- Coordinates: 45°11′N 14°42′E
- Country: Croatia
- Region: Central Croatia (Croatian Littoral)
- County: Primorje-Gorski Kotar County

Government
  - Mayor: Damir Rukavina (HDZ)
  - Town Council: 17 members: HDZ-HSP AS-HSS-HSLS (8); _; SDP-HNS-PGS (6); _; Independents (2); _; ŽZ (1)

Area
  - Town: 28.5 km^{2} (11.0 sq mi)
  - Urban: 8.1 km^{2} (3.1 sq mi)
- Elevation: 0 m (0 ft)

Population (2021)
  - Town: 9,980
  - Density: 350/km^{2} (907/sq mi)
  - Urban: 6,239
  - Urban density: 770/km^{2} (2,000/sq mi)
- Time zone: UTC+1 (CET)
  - Summer (DST): UTC+2 (CEST)
- Postal code: 51 260
- Area code: 051
- Website: crikvenica.hr

Crikvenica (pronounced [ˈt͡srikvɛnit͡sa]) is a town in west Croatia, located on the Adriatic in the Primorje-Gorski Kotar County.

== Names ==
The names of the town in various languages include:

- Latin: Ad Turres
- Italian: Cirquenizza
- Hungarian: Cirkvenica, Cirkvenicza, Czirkvenicza, Czirkwenicza
- German: Cirknenz

== Geography ==
Crikvenica is located southeast of Rijeka and is the largest settlement on the coast of the Vinodol coastal area.

Towns near Crikvenica include Kraljevica, Selce and Novi Vinodolski.

Over the last twenty years, urban expansion of Crikvenica itself and of the nearby town of Selce has resulted in the two merging into a mini-conglomerate.

== Climate ==
Since records began in 1895, the highest temperature recorded at the local weather station was 39.0 °C (102.2 °F), on 17 July 1928. The coldest temperature was −14.0 °C (6.8 °F), on 11 February 1929.

== Demographics ==
In 1895, the obćina of Crikvenica (court at Crikvenica), with an area of 11 square kilometres (4.2 mi^{2}), belonged to the kotar of Novi (Novi court but Selce electoral district) in the Modruš-Rieka županija (Ogulin court and financial board). There were 585 houses, with a population of 3337. Its 13 villages and 12 hamlet were divided for taxation purposes into 2 porezne obćine, under the Bakar office. Crikvenica also had one of two statistical markets in Novi kotar, the other being in Novi itself.

In 1910, the court of Crikvenica encompassed an area of 450 square kilometres (170 mi^{2}), with a population of 24,131. Crikvenica had its own cadastral jurisdiction, but its business court was in Bakar.

In the 2021 census, Crikvenica had a total municipal population of 9980, in the following settlements:

- Crikvenica, population 6239 ▼
- Dramalj, population 1366 ▼
- Jadranovo, population 1077 ▼
- Selce, population 1298 ▼
Town of Crikvenica: Population trends 1857–2021
v

| population | 4566 | 5145 | 5575 | 5910 | 6935 | 7375 | 7817 | 7392 | 5997 | 6170 | 6346 | 8207 | 9501 | 10584 | 11348 | 11122 | 9980 |
| | 1857 | 1869 | 1880 | 1890 | 1900 | 1910 | 1921 | 1931 | 1948 | 1953 | 1961 | 1971 | 1981 | 1991 | 2001 | 2011 | 2021 |

Sources: Croatian Bureau of Statistics publications

== History ==
Crikvenica was developed on the site of a Roman era settlement and military base called Ad Turres. Old Crikvenica was originally an offshoot of the village of Kotor, which is located on a nearby hill and shares its name with that of the village.

The name of the town derives from the word for 'church' (Croatian: crkva, in Chakavian dialect crikva), referring to the monastery church of the Pauline Fathers, which was built by Nikola IV Frankopan nearby in 1412. Nikola IV. Frankopan issued a grant in Modruš, which is also the oldest written document in which the name Crikvenica is mentioned. Beside the church and the monastery at the mouth of the Dubračina, the nearby port of Grižane grew up. In 1760 the local worthy moved from Bribir to Crikvenica and thus it became the centre of the whole Vinodol coast. A great fire of 1776, in which nearly entire Kotor was burnt down, accelerated the migration from the hills towards the coastal areas.

In the 19th century Crikvenica began to attract many tourists, which brought about a turning point in its history. In 1877 a harbour was built in Crikvenica, in 1888 a bathing beach and as early as 1891 the first hotel had opened. In 1895 the Hotel Therapia was opened with 120 beds and a Hydrotherapy Institute. In 1902 the Hotel Crikvenica was built, in 1903 the Bellevue and in 1905 the Miramare. In 1906 Crikvenica became officially a health resort and due to its favourable climate, in the space of just 16 years Crikvenica became the most important resort on the riviera. Today, together with Selce, it is one of the most attractive parts of the Kvarner coast, as well as of the North Adriatic coast of Croatia in general.

In the late 19th and early 20th century, Crikvenica was a district capital in the Modruš-Rijeka County of the Kingdom of Croatia-Slavonia.

=== Kingdom of Yugoslavia ===
During an HRSS rally in Crikvenica 4 February 1923 with 1500 participants including a number from Grižane, Bribir, Selce, Sveta Jelena and Krk, a group of ORJUNA began to jeer the HRSS members, escalating into a skirmish in which the Orjunaši wounded 20, of which 4 seriously, with revolver fire and a bomb.

In 1930, an HKD Napredak branch was founded in Bakar.

=== Recent ===
The last two days of November 2008, the maximum wave height as recorded at nearby Bakar reached a record. Little rain fell, but the city was flooded anyway thanks to a strong sirocco wind. Firefighters had to pump water from basements and the HEP had to repair broken power lines. Some of the Crikvenica's beaches lost all their sand during the storm.

On 16 September 2017, the Dubračina and Suha Ričina Novljanska streams overflowed, flooding Selce, Crikvenica and Novi Vinodolski. This was after 183 millimetres (7.2 in) of rain fell by 6:00.

== Governance ==
=== Local ===
It is divided into three local committees: West Crikvenica, Central Crikvenica and East Crikvenica.

== Archaeology ==
A Roman ceramic workshop was discovered at Crikvenica, in an archaeological site called Igralište. The workshop operated from the latter part of the 1st century BC until the conclusion of the 2nd century AD, producing various ceramic items such as construction materials, amphorae, and pottery.

== Infrastructure ==
In 1913, the only gendarmerie in Crikvenica kotar was in Crikvenica itself, except for the tourist season when one was open in Novi.

== Sport ==
NK Crikvenica is an association football team that play in the Third Football League, at the Gradski stadion, which is located near the centre of Crikvenica. The European route E65 (Jadranska magistrala) dominates the view to the south. The stadium once had a motorcycle speedway track around the pitch and hosted significant competitions such as a qualifying round of the 1970 Speedway World Team Cup and the Yugoslavian National championship.

== Notable people ==
- Milica Mihičić (1864–1950), Croatian actress
- Josif Pančić (1814–1888), botanist
- Ljerko Spiller (1908–2008), Croatian and Argentine violinist
- The family of Argentine Cardinal Estanislao Esteban Karlic (1926–2025) came from in the village of Karlići near Grižane, a small village approximately 5 kilometers (3.1 mi) outside Crikvenica

== Photo gallery ==
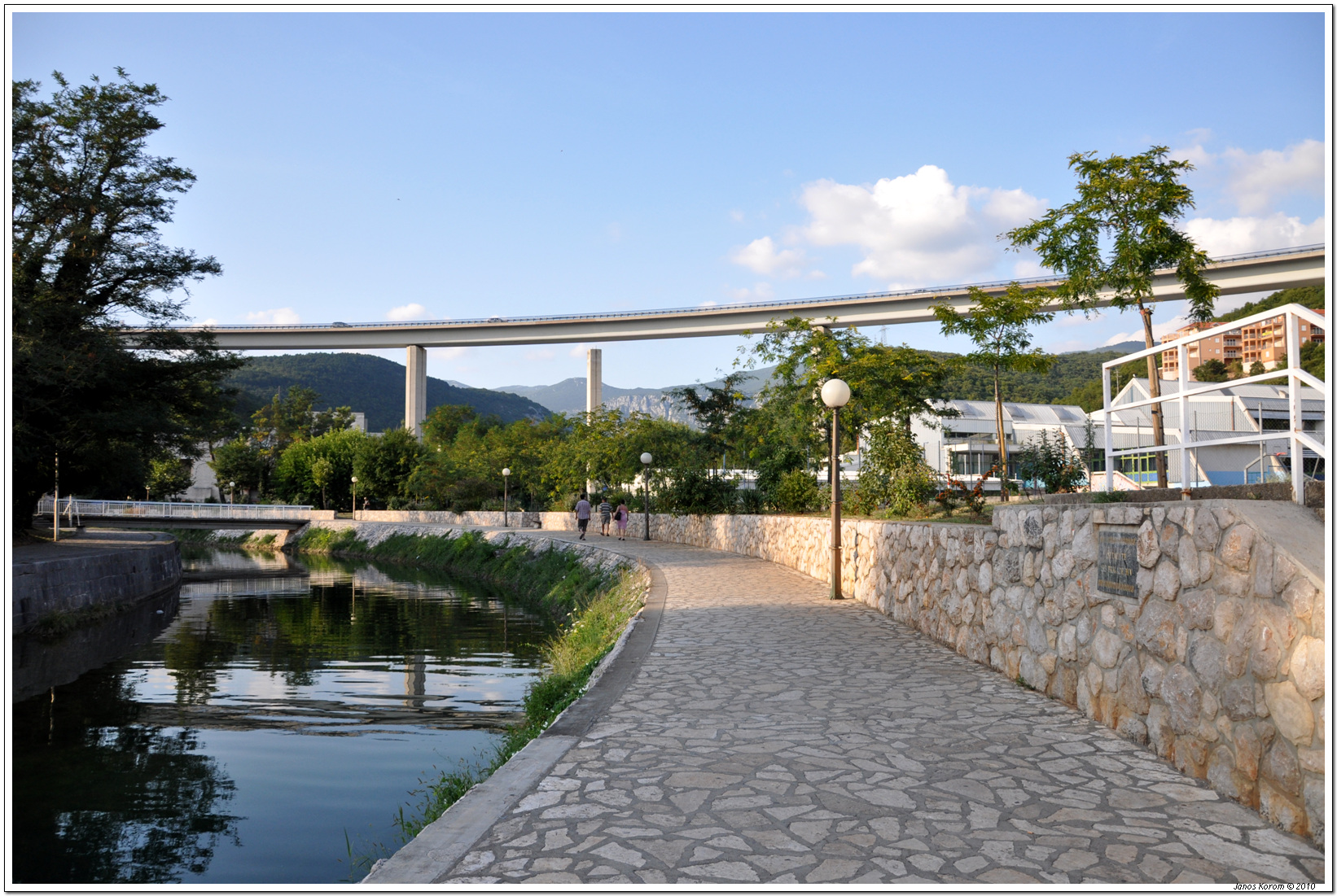
Viaduct passing through the town

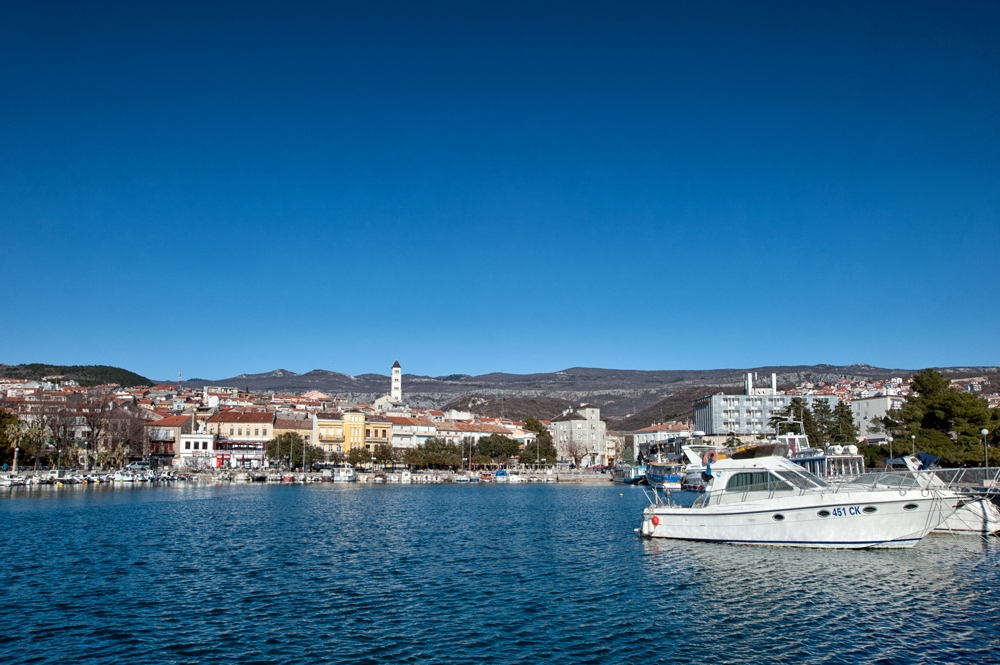
Port of Crikvenica

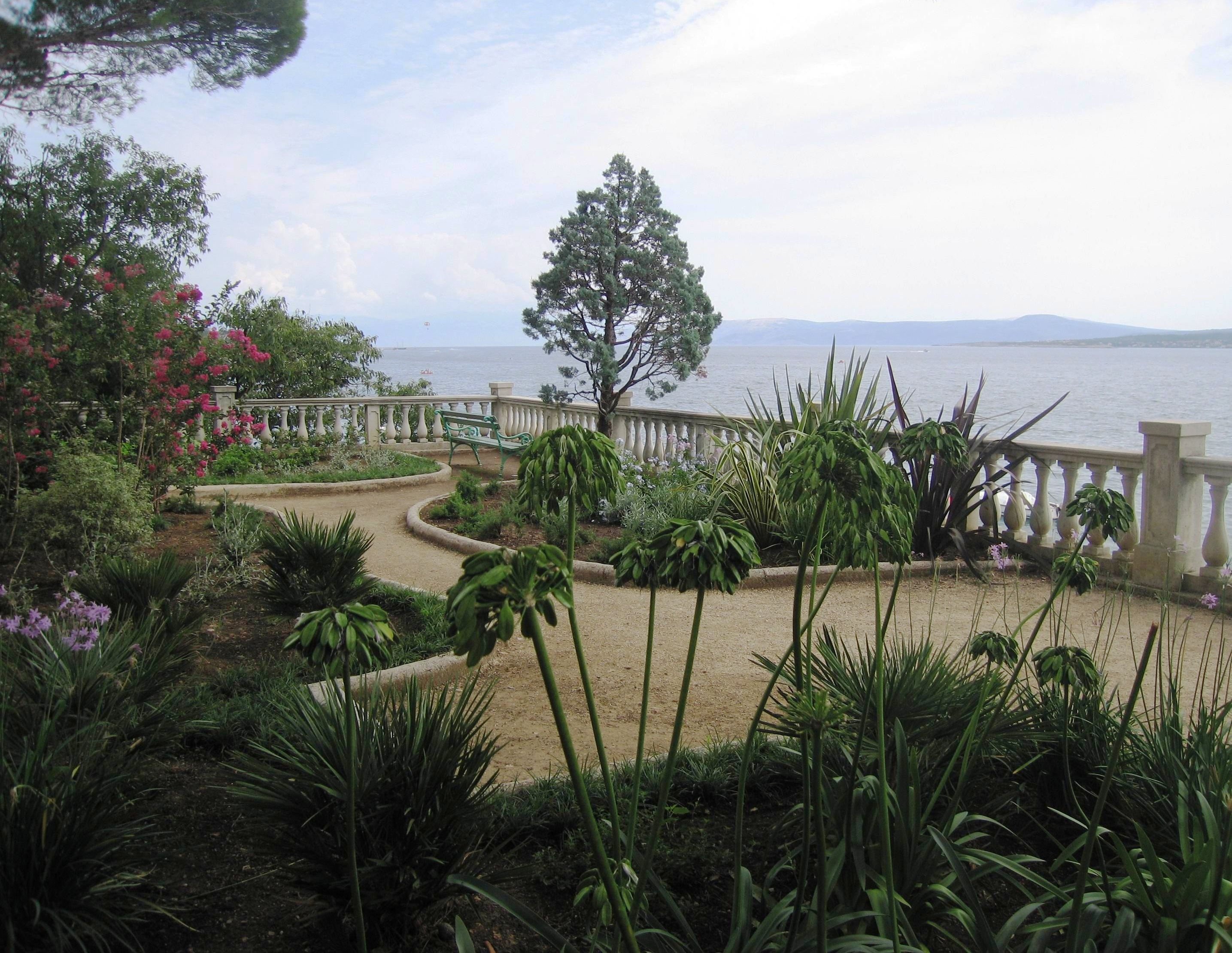
Town park

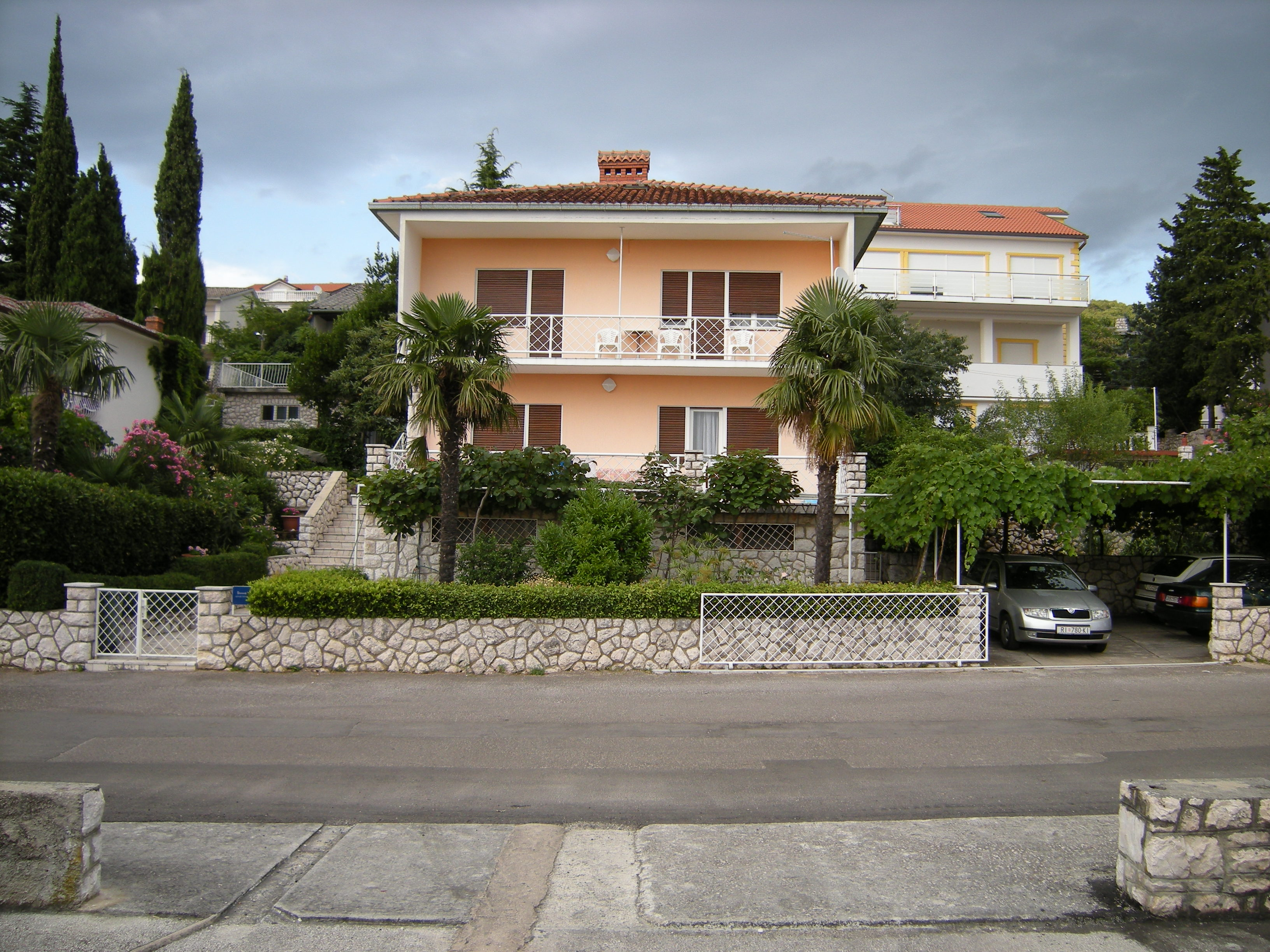
Dramalj

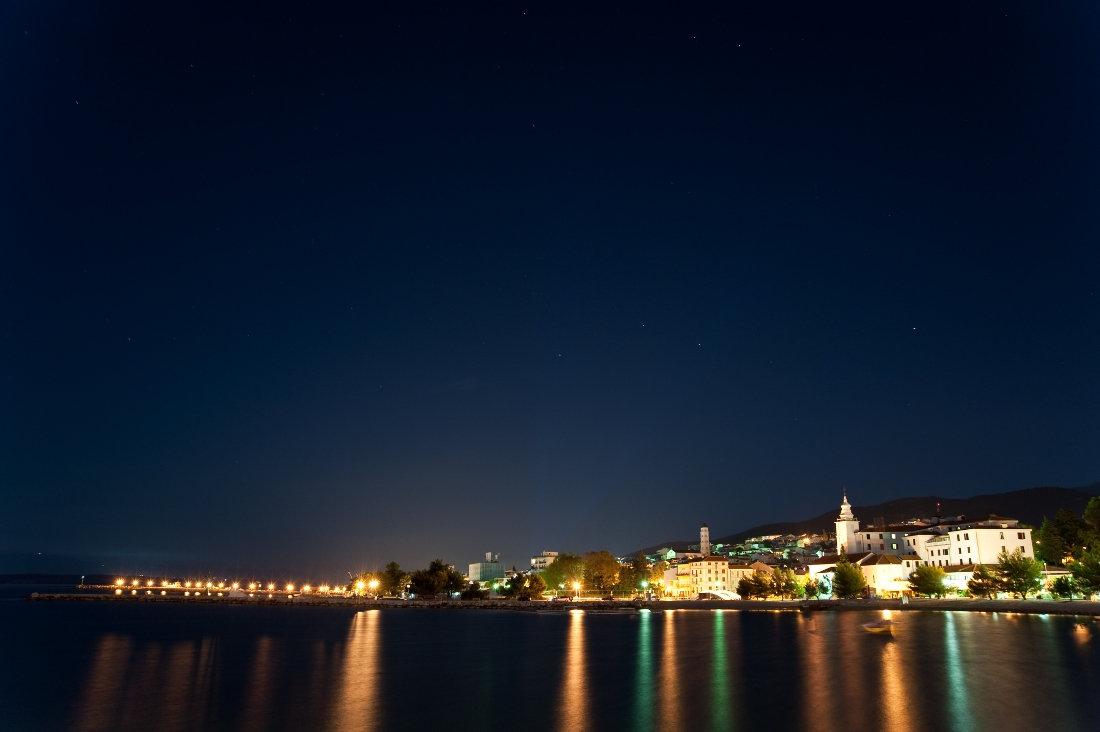
Nighttime view of the town

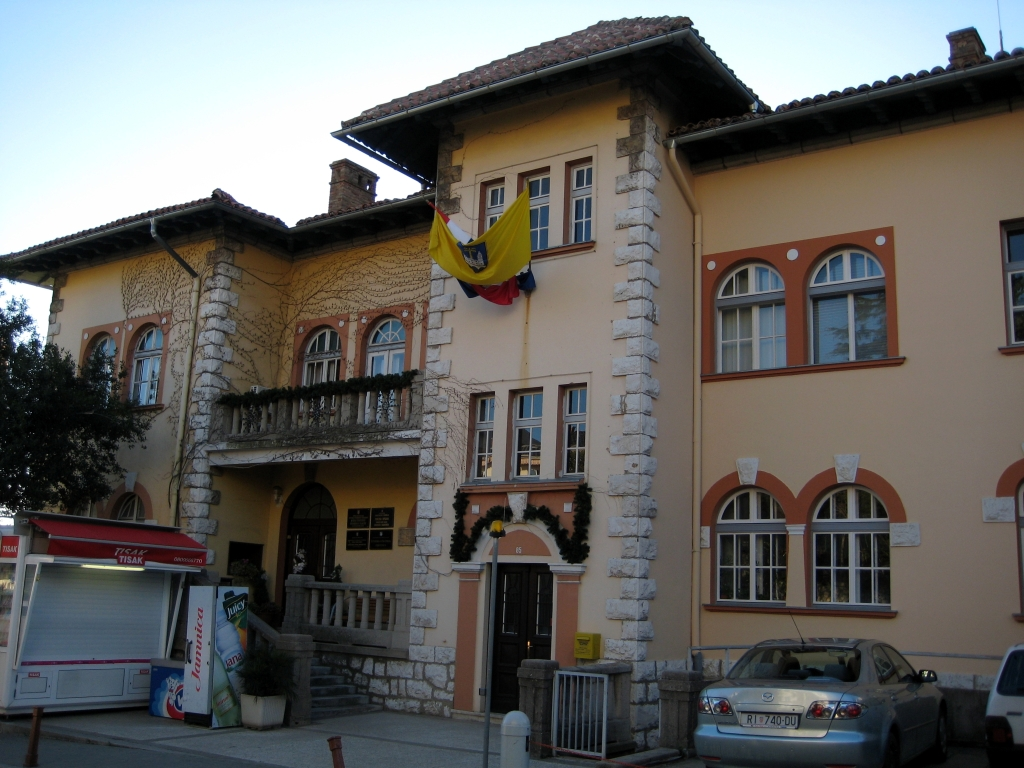
Crikvenica Town Hall

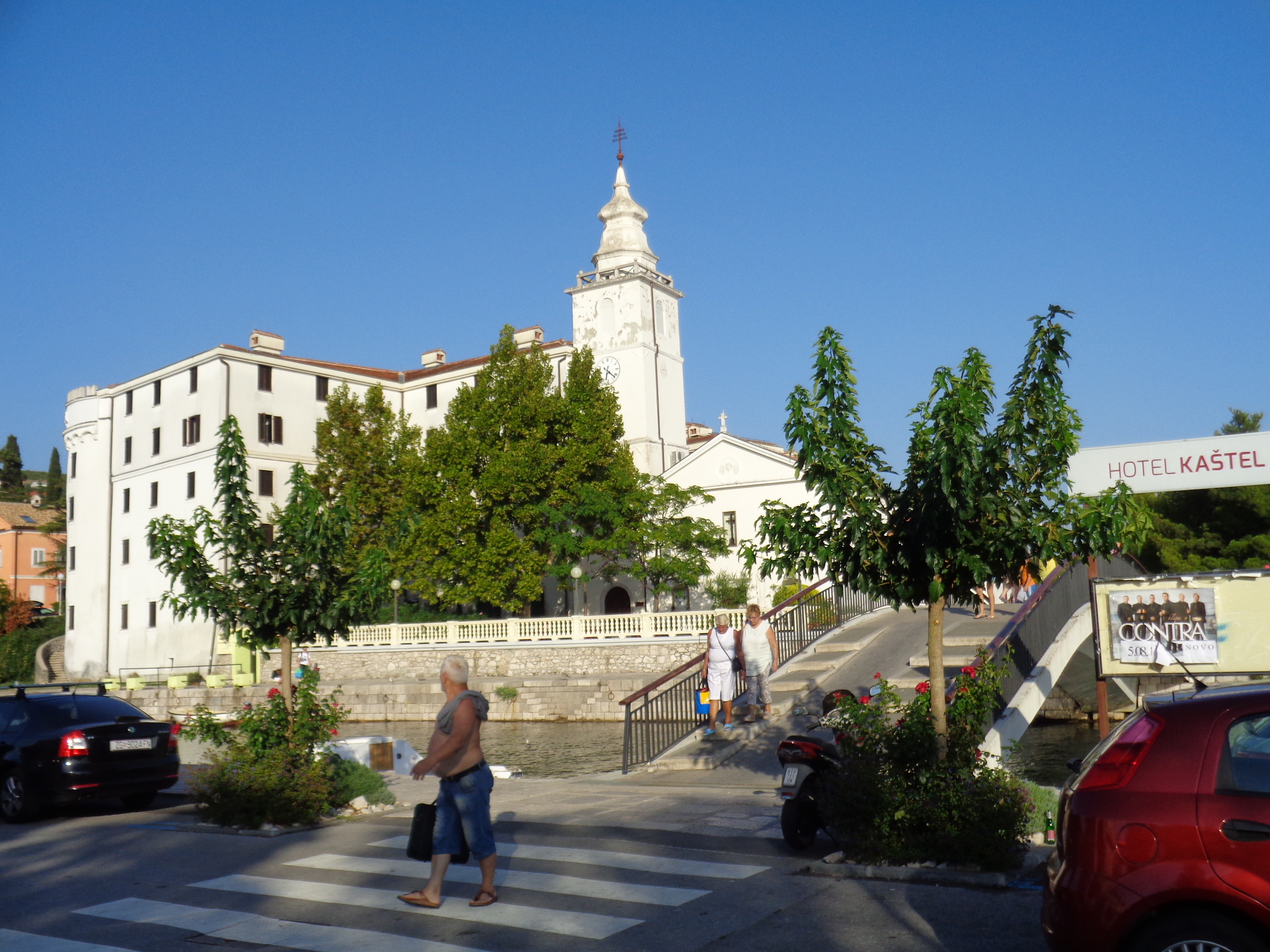
Monastery (today Kaštel Hotel) and Church of the Assumption of the Blessed Virgin Mary

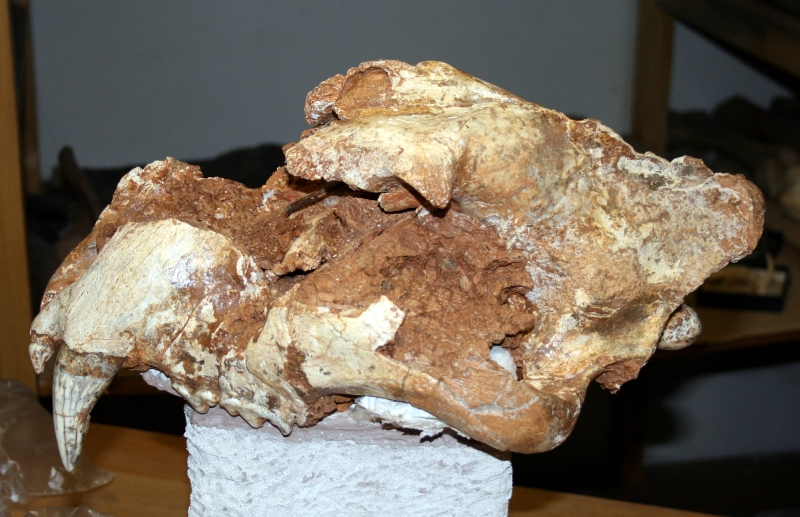
Cave lion skull found in Vrtare Male cave

== See also ==
- Giulio Clovio

== Bibliography ==
- Bašić, Martina (2009). "Crikvenička toponimija" [The toponymy of Crikvenica] (PDF). Folia onomastica Croatica (in Croatian) (18): 1–52.
