= Vrtare Male =

Cave in Croatia with remnants of prehistoric animals

- Jama Vrtare male
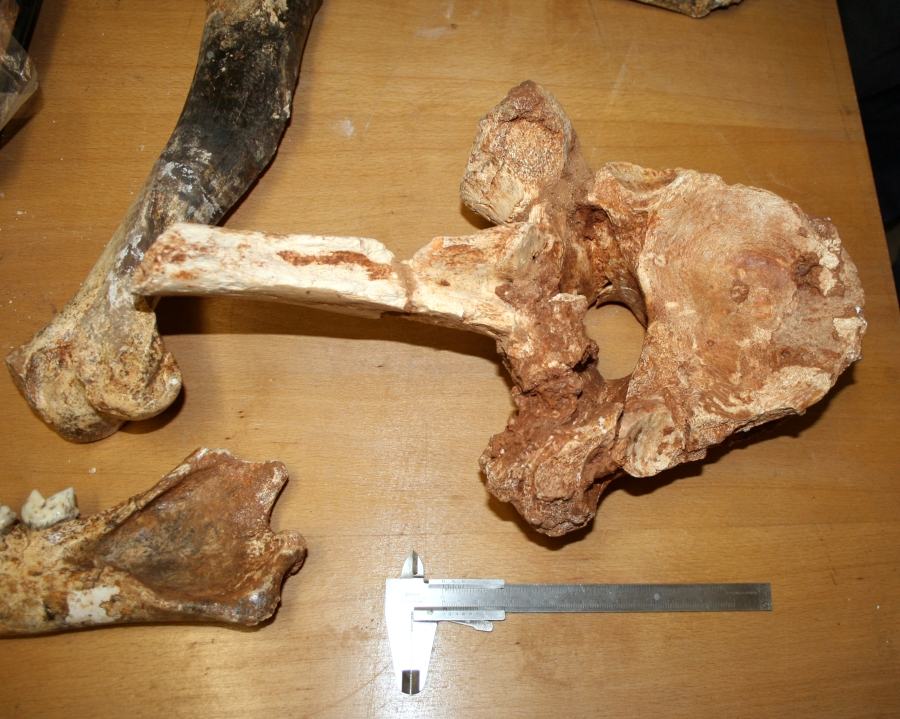
- Vertebra of a mammoth found in Vrtare Male

- Location within Croatia
- Location: Dramalj, Croatia
- Coordinates: 45°11′55″N 14°39′31″E
- Depth: 39 metres (128 ft)

Vrtare Male is a pit cave located near Dramalj, a seaside village in Croatia. Its depth is believed to be 39 metres (128 ft), with around 10 metres (33 ft) submerged. It was first explored in 1966 by the Mountaineering Society Velebit. In 1996, Dragan Pelić, a photographer and spelaeologist from nearby Crikvenica, descended into the cave and found a rare Decapoda specimen, which was confirmed by Croatian spelaeologist Branko Jalžić. This prompted further cave expeditions, starting in 2005, and the establishment of a protected area around Vrtare Male.

The cave is home to the freshwater cave prawn (Troglocaris anophthalmus), endemic to Dinaric karst. Vrtare Male is part of the National Ecological Network of Croatia. It is registered under the code HR3000257, and potential for inclusion in Natura 2000. In 2009, it was proclaimed a geological-palaeontological natural monument. The area under protection covers around 310 square metres (3,300 sq ft).

== Expeditions and exhibitions ==
In 2007, Croatian Natural History Museum organized a palaeontological expedition in Vrtare Male, led by Jalžić, recovering the remains of several specimens of Pleistocene megafauna on the submerged cave floor. The specimens included, among others, a cave lion, one of the largest discovered at the time; a specimen of southern mammoth, a cave bear, a Merck's rhinoceros, a steppe bison and wolves, as well as extinct relatives of fallow deer and horses. The animals were exhibited in 2009 and 2010 in the Crikvenica City Museum and the Croatian Natural History Museum. Panthera Spelaea, a documentary film about Vrtare Male directed by Marin Leko, accompanied the opening of the exhibition in Crikvenica.

Another expedition to Vrtare Male, as well as neighbouring caves Vrtare Vele and Vrtare Nove, was organized in July 2011. A total of 184 Pleistocene fossils were collected and stored by the Crikvenica City Museum. The neighbouring caves are thought to have been originally part of a bigger cave system, which was fractioned in a catastrophe during the Pleistocene. Similarly, the cave entrance is thought to have been larger than today, as large animals have been found in the cave.

== See also ==
- List of Dinaric caves
