= Skandaloto =

Skandaloto Скандалото
- Village
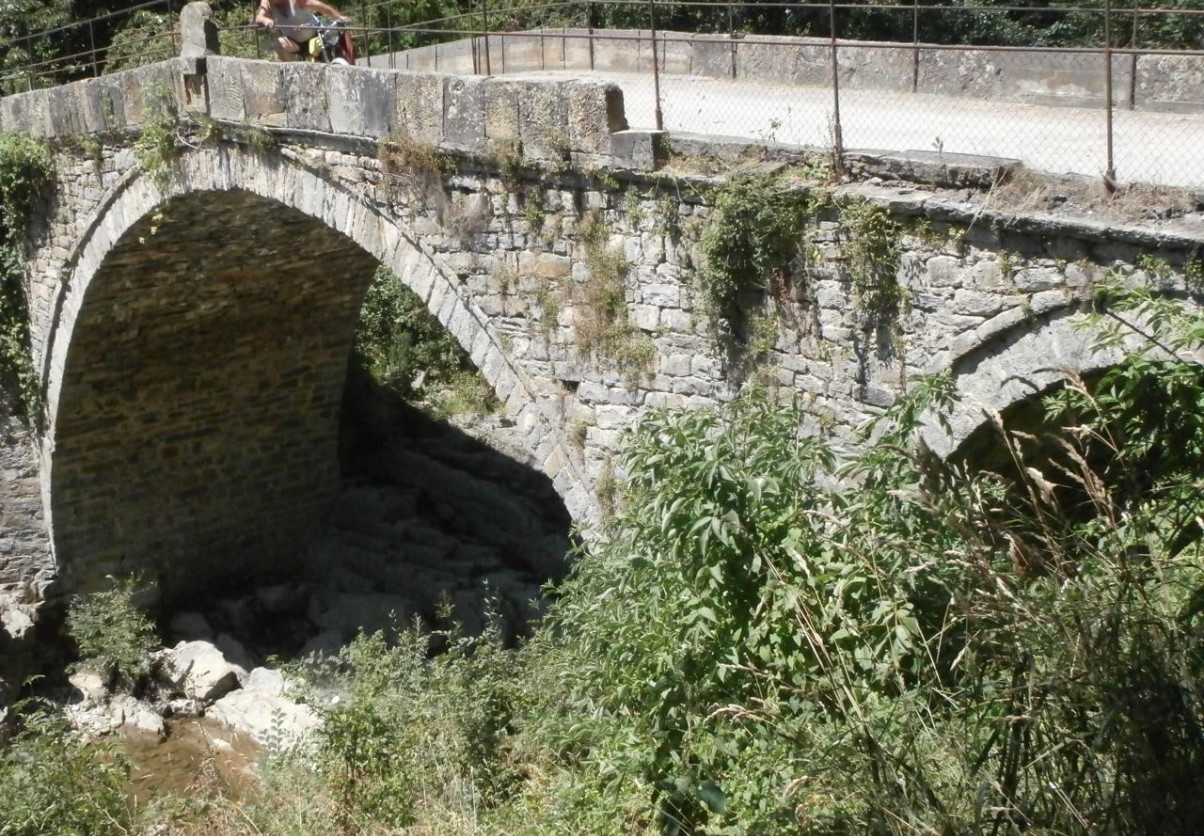
- The old bridge over the River Vidima at Skandaloto.

- Location within Bulgaria
- Coordinates: 42.8833°N 24.8667°E
- Country: Bulgaria
- Province: Lovech Province
- Municipality: Apriltsi
- Time zone: UTC+2 (EET)
  - Summer (DST): UTC+3 (EEST)

Skandaloto (Bulgarian: Скандалото) is a village in Apriltsi Municipality, Lovech Province, northern Bulgaria. It is situated on the banks of the river Vidima.

At the Bulgarian 2011 census, the population of Skandaloto was 65 inhabitants who were entirely ethnic Bulgarians.

The church of the village, St. Archangel Michael, was built in 1870. In is part of the Bulgarian Orthodox Diocese of Lovech.
