= Amadeo's theatre =

Public theatre in Croatia, 1797–1834

Coordinates: 45°49′02″N 15°58′21″E

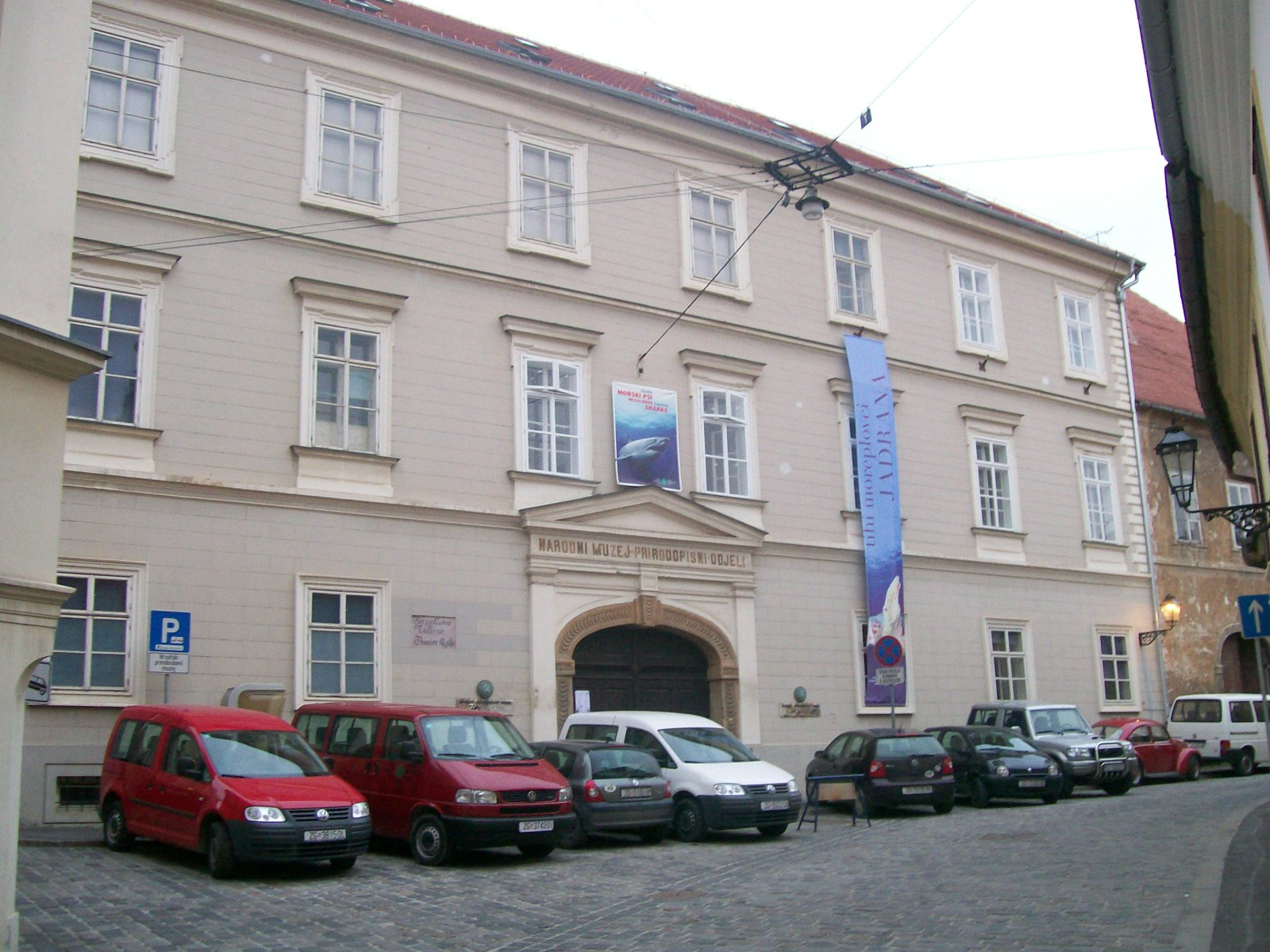
Former Amadeo's palace, now Croatian Natural History Museum, is located at 1 Demetrova Street, in Zagreb's Upper Town.

Amadeo's theatre was founded in Zagreb, Croatia, in 1797 and lasted until 1834. It was the first continuously operating theatre in Zagreb.

== Overview ==
Amadeo's theatre was named after Anton Amade de Varkony, Hungarian count and notable county prefect of Zagreb. Amadeo's theatre was situated in the former Blatna (Mud) and Kazališna (Theatre) Street, which afterwards got the name Demetrova. The building in which it was situated is the present location of the Croatian Natural History Museum and, from 2000, the home of the Amadeo Theatre and Music Company.

Amadeo's theatre was a public theatre which was rented by its owner to a contractor – the principal of the theatrical group with the highest offer. Posters, tickets, announcements and advertisements were printed for plays and other events. The earliest preserved poster, dated January 1799, advertised a comic opera by Giovanni Paisiello.

After the death of Amade de Varkony in January 1835, his son sold the building, and theatre life in Zagreb moved to the then newly built Stanković's theatre in St. Mark's Square.

== Repertoire ==
The plays in Amadeo's theatre were performed almost exclusively in the German language. In 1832 and 1833 German actors in Amadeo's theatre performed the first public and professional plays in the Croatian Kajkavian dialect. Dragutin Rakovac (1813–1854) translated two comedies by Kotzebue to Kajkavian, and Josef Schweigert, director and actor of a German group who was performing at the theatre at the time, portrayed the following plays:

- 2 October 1832 Ztari mladosenja i kosharice (by Kotzebue)
- 28 January 1833 Vkanjeni Vkanitel (by Florijan)
- 23 July 1833 Ztari zaszebni kuchish Petra III (by Kotzebue)

A collective German language repertoire with standard features of the Austrian province of the time was portrayed in Amadeo's theatre: dramas, operas, ballets and a special kind of uncomplicated plays with singing sections which later developed into an operetta called Singspiel. At the beginning of the 19th century, the occurrence of writers pertaining to the Vienna circle, who marked the beginning of the Vienna folk theatre with their works, is becoming more and more frequent, and without them it would be impossible to imagine the genesis of the Croatian folk play.

In the Croatian theatrical history, Amadeo's theatre had a primarily educational role.
