= Tourist season =

Tourist season may refer to:

- For tourism destinations, the months of peak demand or the months in which seasonal attractions are open
- Tourist Season, a 1986 novel by Carl Hiaasen

== See also ==
- Tourist (disambiguation)
