= Mladen Tarbuk =

- Born: 19 July 1962 (age 63); Sarajevo, PR Bosnia and Herzegovina, Yugoslavia
- Genres: classical music
- Occupations: conductor, composer, producer, music pedagogue, music writer
- Years active: 1987 –
- Labels: Cantus, Croatia Records, HoneyRock, Doblinger

Mladen Tarbuk (Sarajevo, 1962) is a Croatian conductor, composer and music pedagogue.

== Biography ==
At the Faculty of Science, University of Zagreb, he studied physics, while at the Zagreb Academy of Music, he studied composition under Prof. Stanko Horvat and conducting under Prof. Igor Gjadrov. He continued his conducting studies at the University of Music and Performing Arts in Graz with Milan Horvat. At the University of Music and Performing Arts in Vienna, he further refined his skills in composition with Friedrich Cerha and in conducting with Uroš Lajovic.

Tarbuk conducted many prestigious symphony orchestras and opera companies, such as Hungarian State Opera House, Teatro Verdi Trieste, Nordic Symphony Orchestra, Musikverein, Slovenian Philharmonic Orchestra, Hungarian Radio and Television Orchestra, Symphonic Orchestra of the State Mexico, Opera Lyra Ottawa, Prague State Opera, Budafok Symphony Orchestra Dohnanyi, Orchestra Sinfonica Siciliana, Haifa Symphony Orchestra, Sinfonietta Cracovia, at the National Music Festival in Chestertown, just to name a few.

From 2004 to 2009, he worked regularly at the Opera at Rhine in Düsseldorf as a guest conductor, conducting there a large repertoire including An Abduction from Seraglio to Il Trittico and La Wally. Between 2020 and 2024 he was the president of Croatian Composers' Society. In 2013-2014, he held the position of music director, and 2014-2017 of general artistic director at Dubrovnik Summer Festival. From 2002 to 2005, he was the general director of Croatian National Theatre in Zagreb. He is also a full-time professor at the Zagreb Music Academy where he teaches subjects like composition, conducting and symphonic orchestra.

There he induced huge stage productions realized in collaboration with all artistic components of the University of Zagreb, including Music, Drama, Fine Arts and the Textile Design Academy. Since 2017 he has taught and has created projects at Bern Academy of Arts, in collaboration with Schweizer Opernstudio.

Tarbuk has written about 90 compositions, ranging from chamber music to large symphonic forms, or pieces for music theatre. His compositions have been performed in major festivals of contemporary music, among which are Wien Modern, George Enescu Festival Bucharest, The World Music Days, Europamusicale Munich, Musicora Paris, Trieste Prima, World Saxophone Congress Glasgow, Moscow Autumn and Music Biennale Zagreb. His works appear in many recordings by labels such as HoneyRock, Doblinger and Cantus. His ballet Streetcar Named Desire opened The World Days of Music 2005 in Zagreb.

Tarbuk has been honored with several prizes for his conducting and compositions, like Dr. E. Vogel, Tolosa 93, Janaček, as well as the Croatian prizes Golden Bell, Šulek, Slavenski (five times), Croatian Academy of Sciences and Arts Award (two times), Trnina and Papandopulo (two times).
