= Apriltsi =

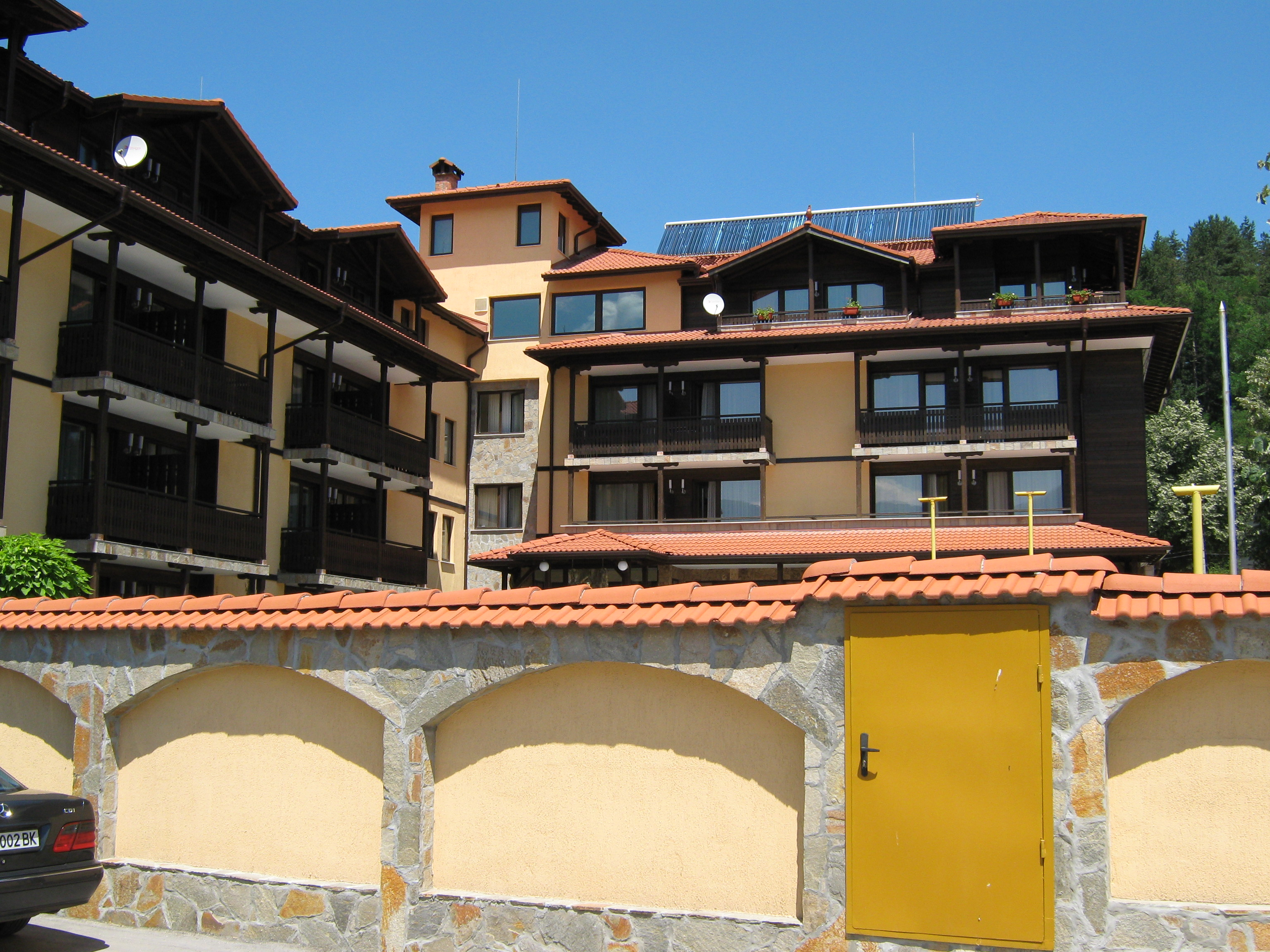
- Hotel in Apriltsi

- Location of Apriltsi
- Coordinates: 42°50′N 24°55′E Mayor=Tihomir Kukenski (GERB)
- Country: Bulgaria
- Provinces (Oblast): Lovech
- Elevation: 550 m (1,800 ft)

Population (15.03.2022)
  - Total: 2,613
- Time zone: UTC+2 (EET)
  - Summer (DST): UTC+3 (EEST)
- Postal Code: 5641
- Area code: 06958

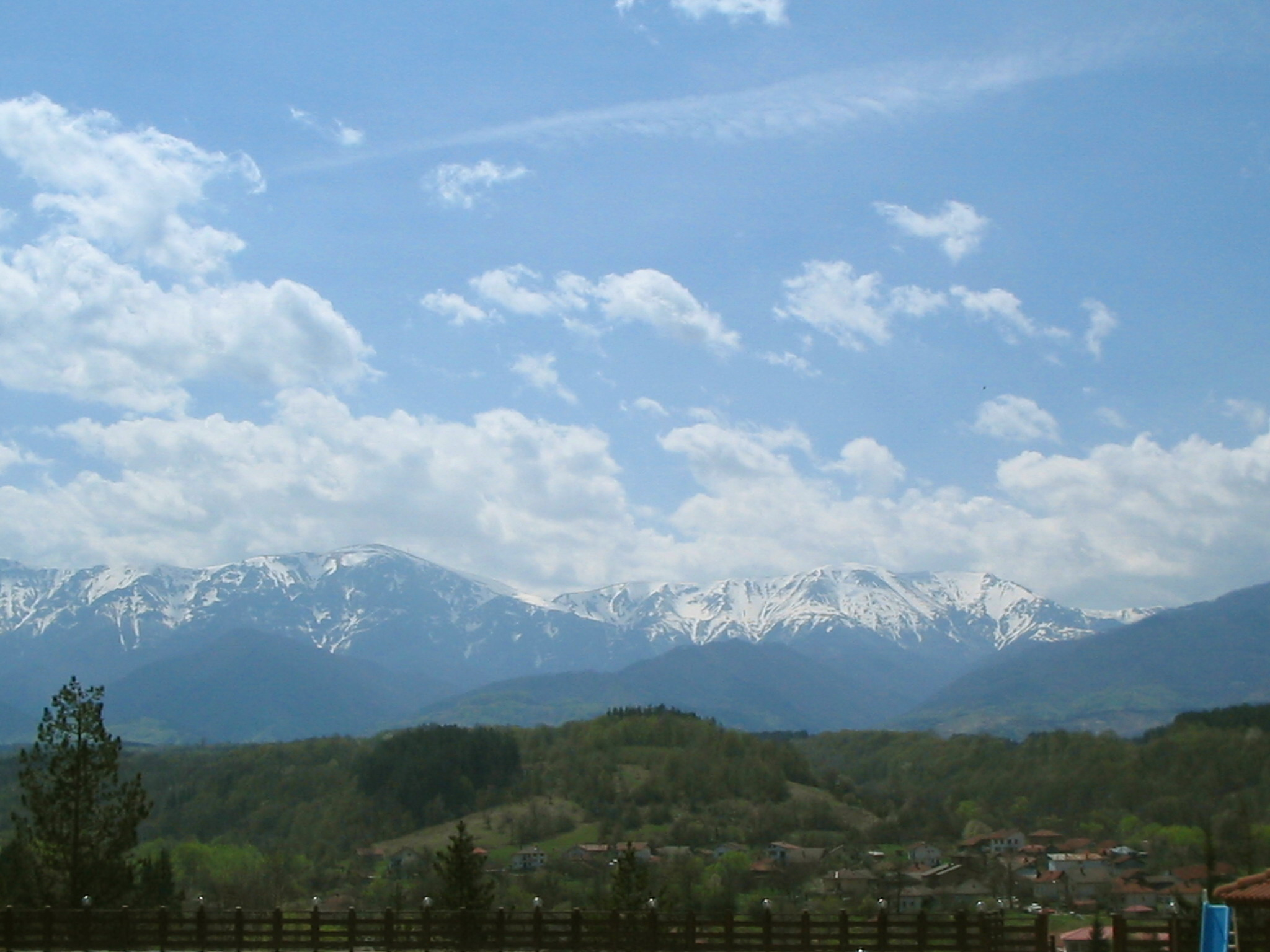
View of the Central Balkan Mountains from Apriltsi

Apriltsi (Bulgarian: Априлци [ɐˈpriɫt͡si]) is a small town in Lovech Province, Central-North Bulgaria, located in the vicinity of the highest part of Stara Planina mountain. It is the administrative centre of the homonymous Apriltsi Municipality. As of December 2009, the town had a population of 3,318.

Due to its favourable location in a valley at the foot of Botev Peak in the Balkan Mountains, Apriltsi is a newly developing tourist resort in the region. Besides Botev, notable peaks in the area are Triglav and Maragidik.

The town was founded by the merging of four large mountain villages: Novo Selo, Zla Reka, Vidima, and Ostrets, which are today the town's neighbourhoods. Due to this, it has a rather rural appearance with some 19th-century Bulgarian houses preserved.
