= Opština =

Administrative subdivision in Slavic countries roughly equivalent to a municipality

Opština, općina, občina, obshtina or obshchina (Cyrillic: општина, опћина or община), is a local government unit in Slavic-speaking countries, most commonly translated as municipality in English. It is used by the following countries:

Country	Singular	Dual	Plural	related article
Bosnia and Herzegovina	općina / опћина, opština / општина		općine / опћине, opštine / општине	municipalities of Bosnia and Herzegovina (3rd level in FB&H, 2nd level in RS; see also City#Municipal services)
Bulgaria	община (obshtina)		общини (obshtini)	municipalities of Bulgaria (2nd level)
Croatia	općina		općine	municipalities of Croatia (2nd level)
North Macedonia	општина (opština)		oпштини (opštini)	municipalities of North Macedonia (1st level)
Kosovo	општина / opština		oпштине / opštine	municipalities of Kosovo (Albanian: komunë or komuna, plural: komuna or komunët) (1st level)
Montenegro	opština / општина		opštine / oпштине	municipalities of Montenegro (1st level)
Russia	община (obshchina)		общины (obshchiny)	commune, plural: communes
Serbia	општина / opština		oпштине / opštine	municipalities of Serbia (2nd level)
Slovenia	občina	občini	občine	municipalities of Slovenia (1st level)
