= Male Orjule =

Island in Croatia

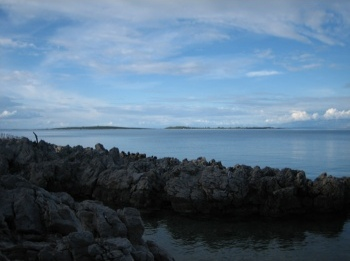
- Vele Orjule (left) and Male Orjule (right) from Sveti Petar
- Interactive map of Male Orjule

Geography
- Location: Adriatic Sea
- Coordinates: 44°29′25″N 14°33′51″E
- Archipelago: Cres-Lošinj
- Area: 0.33 km^{2} (0.13 sq mi)
- Highest elevation: 11 m (36 ft)

Administration
- Croatia

Demographics
- Population: 0

Male Orjule is an uninhabited Croatian island in the Adriatic Sea located southeast of Lošinj. Its area is 0.33 km^{2} (0.13 sq mi).

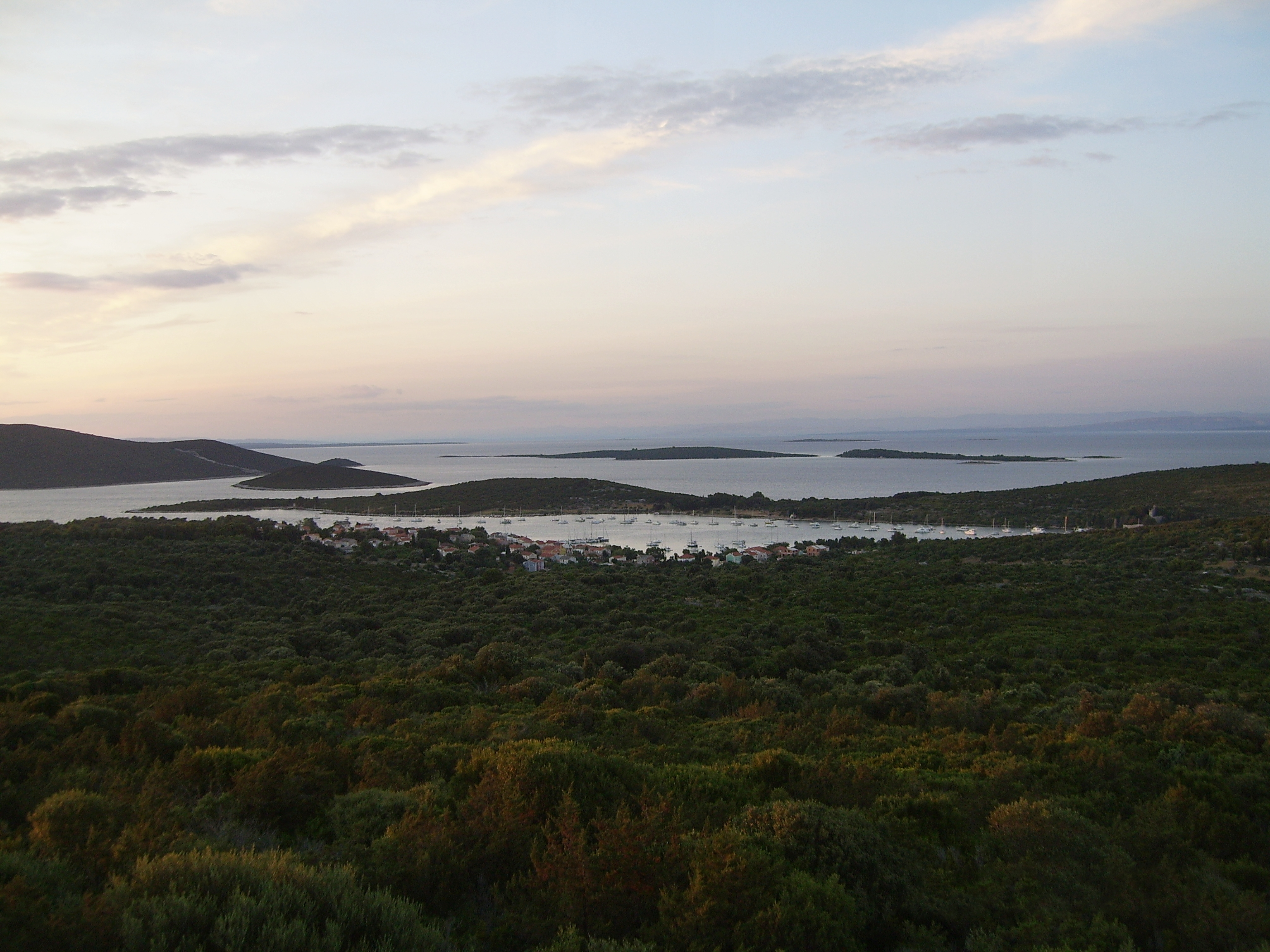
View from the highest hill of the island Ilovik
