= Vele Orjule =

Island in Croatia

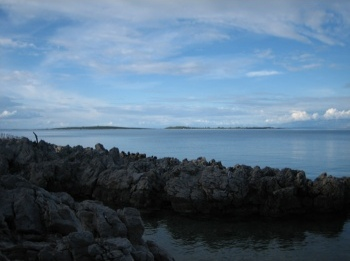
- Vele Orjule (left) and Male Orjule (right) from Sveti Petar

- Location within Croatia
- Interactive map of Vele Orjule

Geography
- Location: Adriatic Sea
- Coordinates: 44°30′00″N 14°33′21″E
- Archipelago: Cres-Lošinj
- Area: 1.06 km^{2} (0.41 sq mi)
- Highest elevation: 30 m (100 ft)
- Highest point: Pristavnica

Administration
- Croatia
- County: Primorje-Gorski Kotar County

Demographics
- Population: 0

Vele Orjule is an uninhabited Croatian island in the Adriatic Sea located southeast of Lošinj. Its area is 1.06 km^{2} (0.41 sq mi).

The west side of the island provide good and sheltered anchorage.

In 1996, the statue of Croatian Apoxyomenos was discovered there.

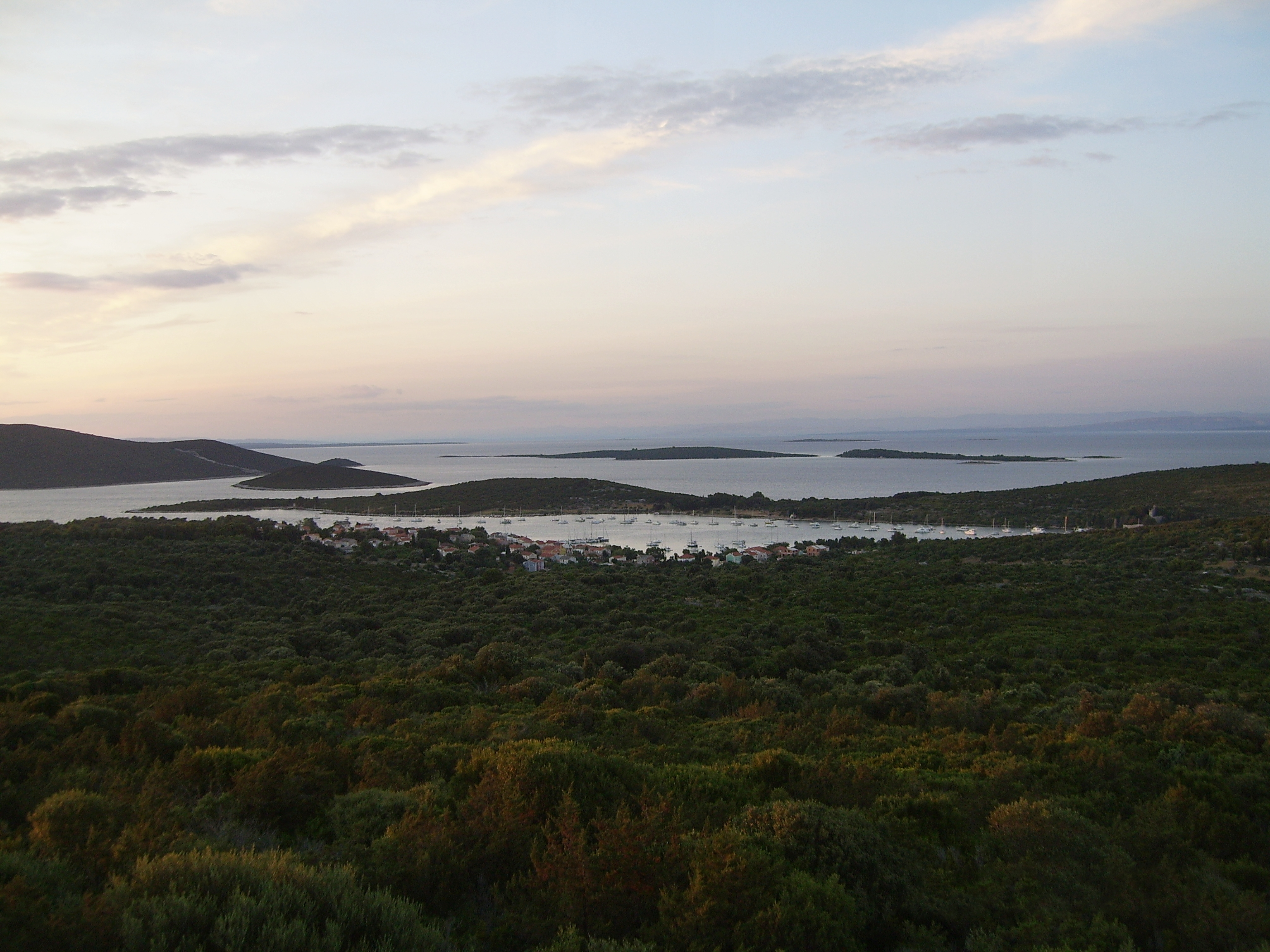
View from the highest hill of the island Ilovik
