= OCM =

OCM may refer to:

- Observe, copy, modify, also known as observe, imitate, modify.
- OCM (gene), also known as LOC4951, a human gene
- O'Callaghans Mills, a small village in Ireland (local folkloric slang)
- Occupy Central Movement
- Ocean Colour Monitor, an instrument launched on the IRS-P4 satellite on 1999-May-26
- Office for Coordination and Management, a component of the European Space Agency
- Ohio Community Media, a newspaper company in the United States
- Oil cleansing method, an alleged skin-cleansing method
- Oil content meter, a measuring device used on Marine Oily Water Separators
- Oil-Cut Mud, in oil drilling parlance
- Oka Chinna Maata,
- Olympic Council of Malaysia
- On-camera meteorologist
- One Caribbean Media
- Online Condition Monitoring, for maintenance
- Open Cloud Manifesto, also known as the Cloud Computing Manifesto
- Optical Channel Monitor, a device for optical performance monitoring in fiber-optic communications networks
- Oracle Certified Master, a designation in the Oracle Certification Program
- Oracle Configuration Manager, a service of Oracle Corporation
- Ordo Sancti Constantini Magni, Order of Saint Constantine the Great
- Organisation civile et militaire (English "Civilian and Military Organisation"), a group of the French Resistance
- Organizational Change Management
- Oriental Carpet Manufacturers, a London-based company involved in the production of, and trade with, Oriental carpets
- Original component manufacturer
- Oxidative coupling of methane
- Boolgeeda Airport, IATA airport code "OCM"
