= Strigil =

Ancient Greek and Roman cleaning tool

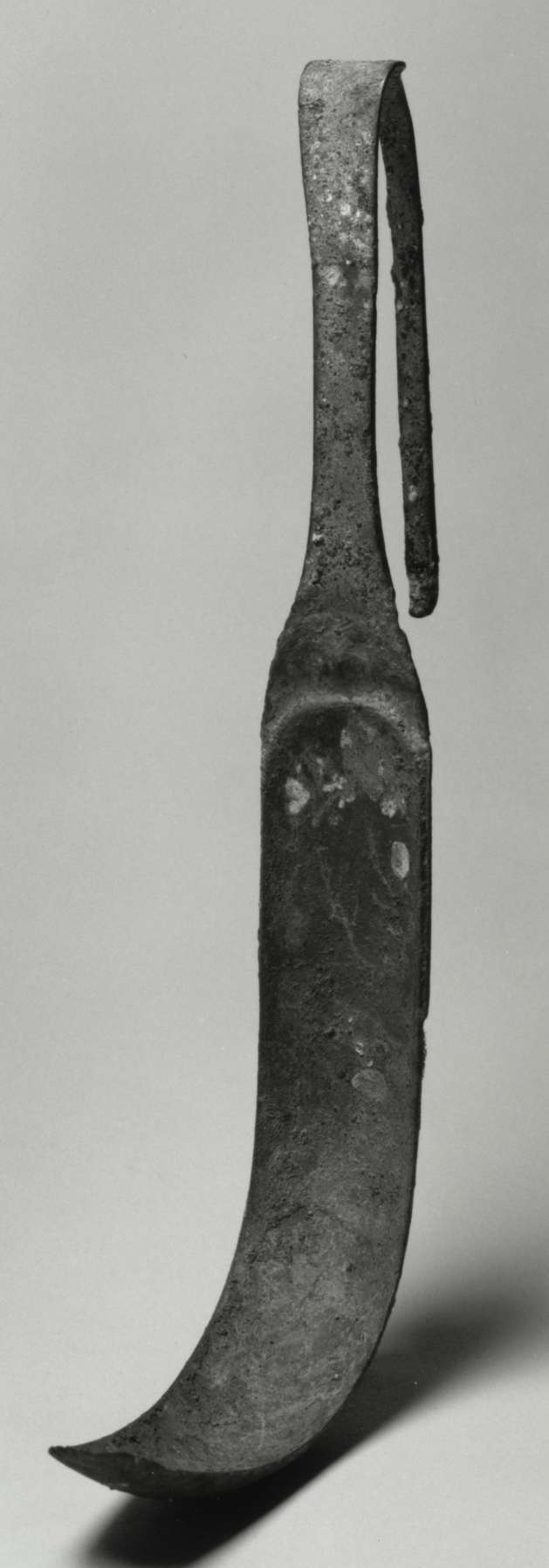
Bronze strigil (Roman, 1st century AD, Walters Art Museum

The strigil (Latin: strigilis) or stlengis (Ancient Greek: στλεγγίς, probably a loanword from the Pre-Greek substrate) is a tool for cleansing the body by scraping off dirt and perspiration, as well as oil that was applied before bathing in Ancient Greek and Roman cultures. In these cultures the strigil was primarily used by men, specifically male athletes; however, in Etruscan culture there is evidence of strigils being used by both sexes. The standard design is a curved blade with a handle, all of which is made of metal.

Strigils were commonly used by individuals who were engaging in vigorous activities, in which they accumulated large amounts of dirt and sweat on their bodies. The people who used the strigil included athletes, the wealthy, soldiers, and more. However, wealthy or prestigious individuals often had slaves to wield the strigils and clean their bodies, rather than doing it themselves.

Strigils were not only significant in a practical sense, but culturally as well. They are often found in tombs or burials, in some cases along with a bottle of oil.

== Representations ==
=== Timeline ===
Strigils were apparently not used in the earlier ages of Greek history. This is supported by Homer's poems, which state that oil was applied after bathing and was not removed. Furthermore, strigils are not mentioned in literature until the later portion of the 5th century BC. As early as the 6th century BC, however, representations of strigils can be found on vases. By the 4th century BC, strigils are depicted in other types of artwork, such as skyphoi and statues.

In Book 23 of the Iliad, during the funeral games for Patroclus, Homer describes the athletes using strigils to clean themselves after physical contests. This is one of the earliest literary references to the strigil in Greek culture, illustrating its use in the context of athletic events, which were an important part of Greek social and religious life.

=== Cultural depictions ===
As stated above, strigils are represented throughout Greek, Roman, and Etruscan cultures in varying ways. Strigils were often depicted alongside olive oil and an athlete. The Croatian Apoxyomenos is a bronze statue that displays the use of a strigil by an athlete. Strigils were also represented on some sarcophagi, such as the marble strigil sarcophagus of a Greek physician, which has elaborate S-shaped curves on it to symbolize strigils.

One source offers an alternative portrayal of strigils, "a secondary meaning for the word stlengis, strigil, is wreath or tiara." To support the claim that a strigil may have been viewed as a tiara or wreath, there was a 5th-century grave that had a strigil across the forehead of a corpse.

==== Burials and tombs ====
Strigils were significant beyond merely being tools for cleansing; they were also a common offering given to the deceased during burial. For instance, three graves from Greece in the 3rd century BC, which contained adult males, all had iron strigils.

In the excavation of another 3rd-century BC tomb, which contained an Etruscan woman, there was an inscribed silver strigil along with a mirror. Strigils were commonly found in the tombs of Etruscan women, and it seemed to be an essential part of women’s bathing equipment. The inscribed silver strigil of the Etruscan tomb has two inscriptions on the handle: One being "śuthina", an inscription found on numerous objects in the tomb. While the other, more significant inscription is a monogram, R:M, which reads as Ra:Mu. The monogram is speculated to be the beginning of the Etruscan woman’s name.

In 2018, archaeologists discovered in Assos many strigils. Some of the strigils found were iron, but most were made of bronze.

=== Composition and design ===
As is obvious from the strigils found in the previously discussed tombs, strigils could differ in the type of metal used, design, etc., depending on the status of the individual it belonged to, time period, and other relevant factors. The typical metals used for strigils were bronze and iron. Some other variations of strigils are as follows: Hippias, an ancient Greek sophist who created his own strigil, made it in a unique way which allowed for sweat to drain through a small channel. Literature from Plutarch states that Spartans used reeds at times instead of the typical metal strigils.

== Gallery ==
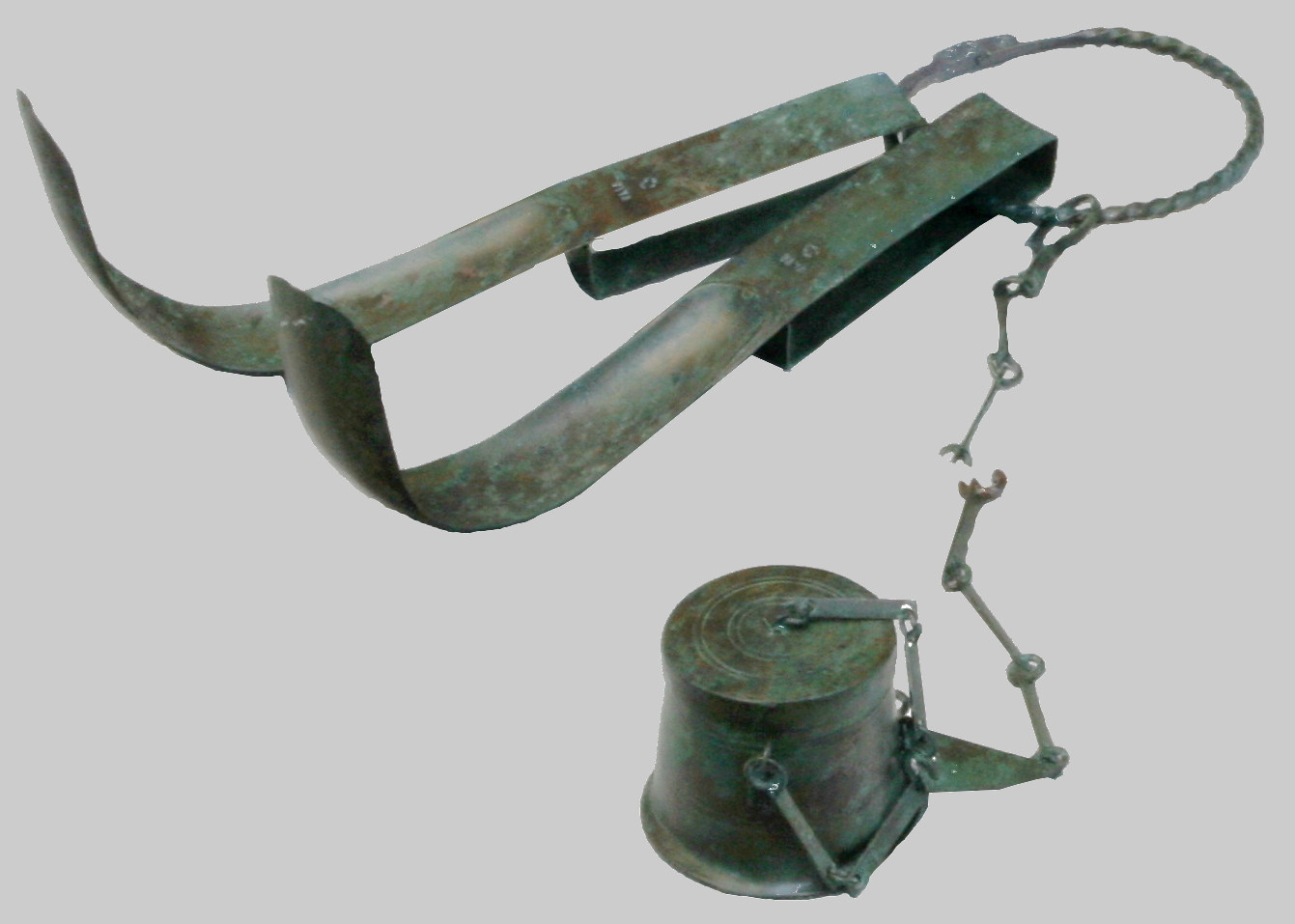
Roman strigils, 1st century BC

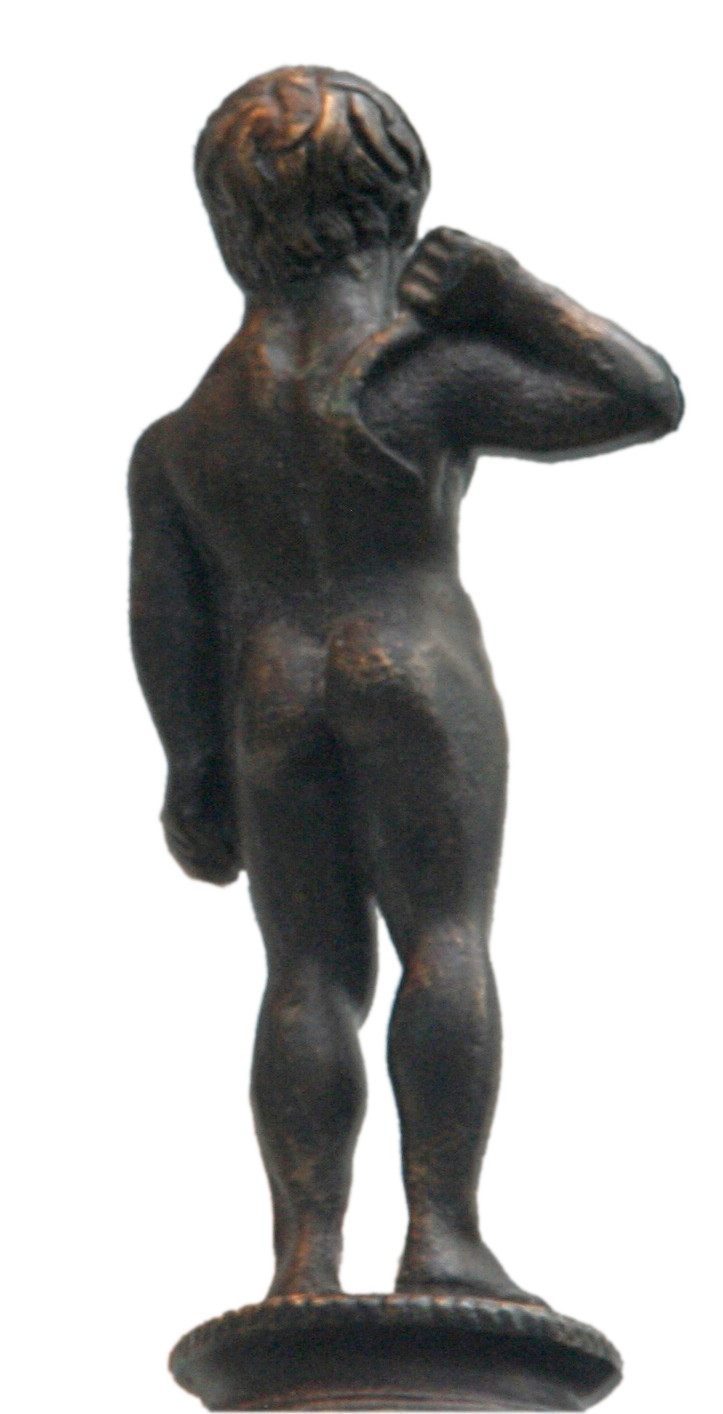
Apoxyomenos: an athlete cleaning himself

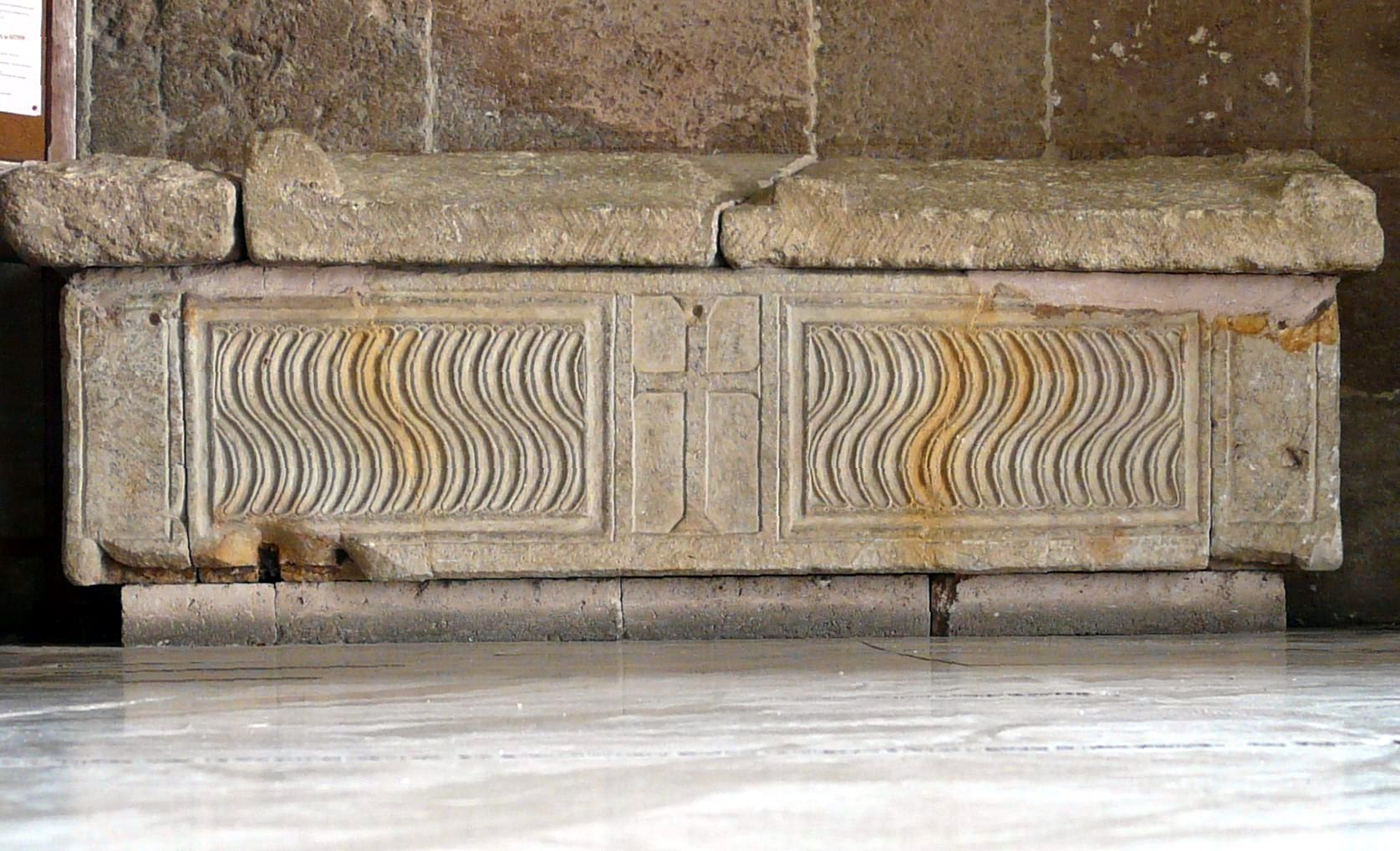
Strigil Sarcophagus in Saint-Victor de Marseille Abbey

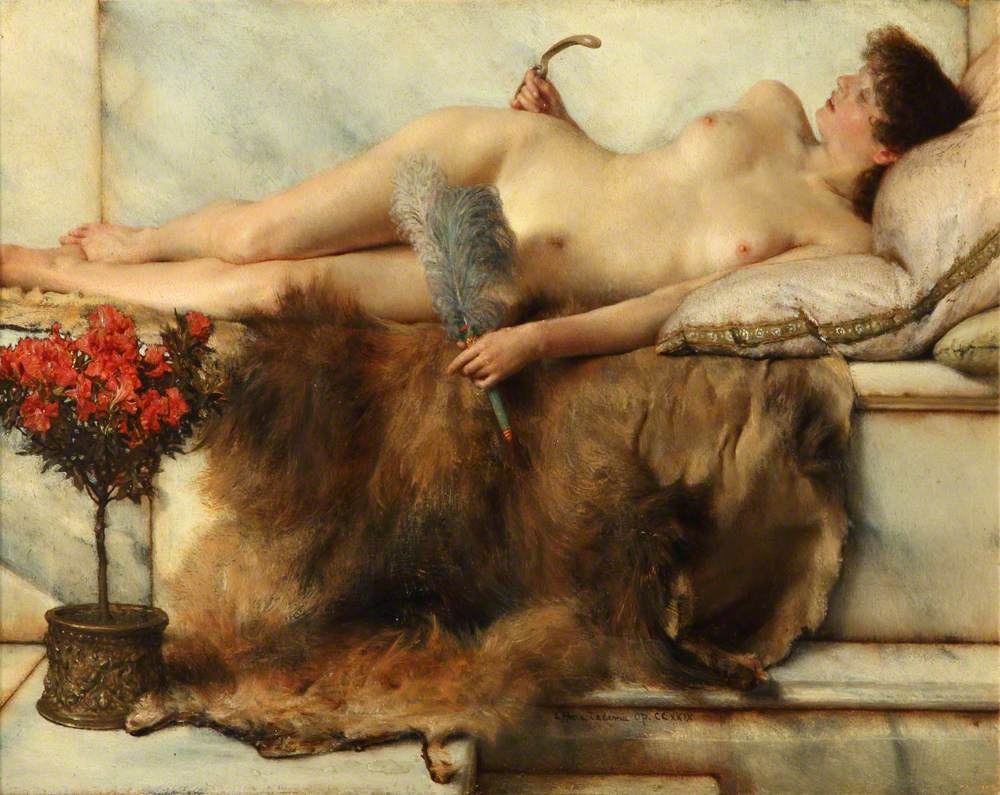
The Tepidarium by Lawrence Alma-Tadema, 1881

== See also ==
- Gymnasium (ancient Greece)
- Roman bath
- Oil cleansing method
- Gua sha
