= Apoxyomenos =

Subject of Greek votive sculpture

External videos
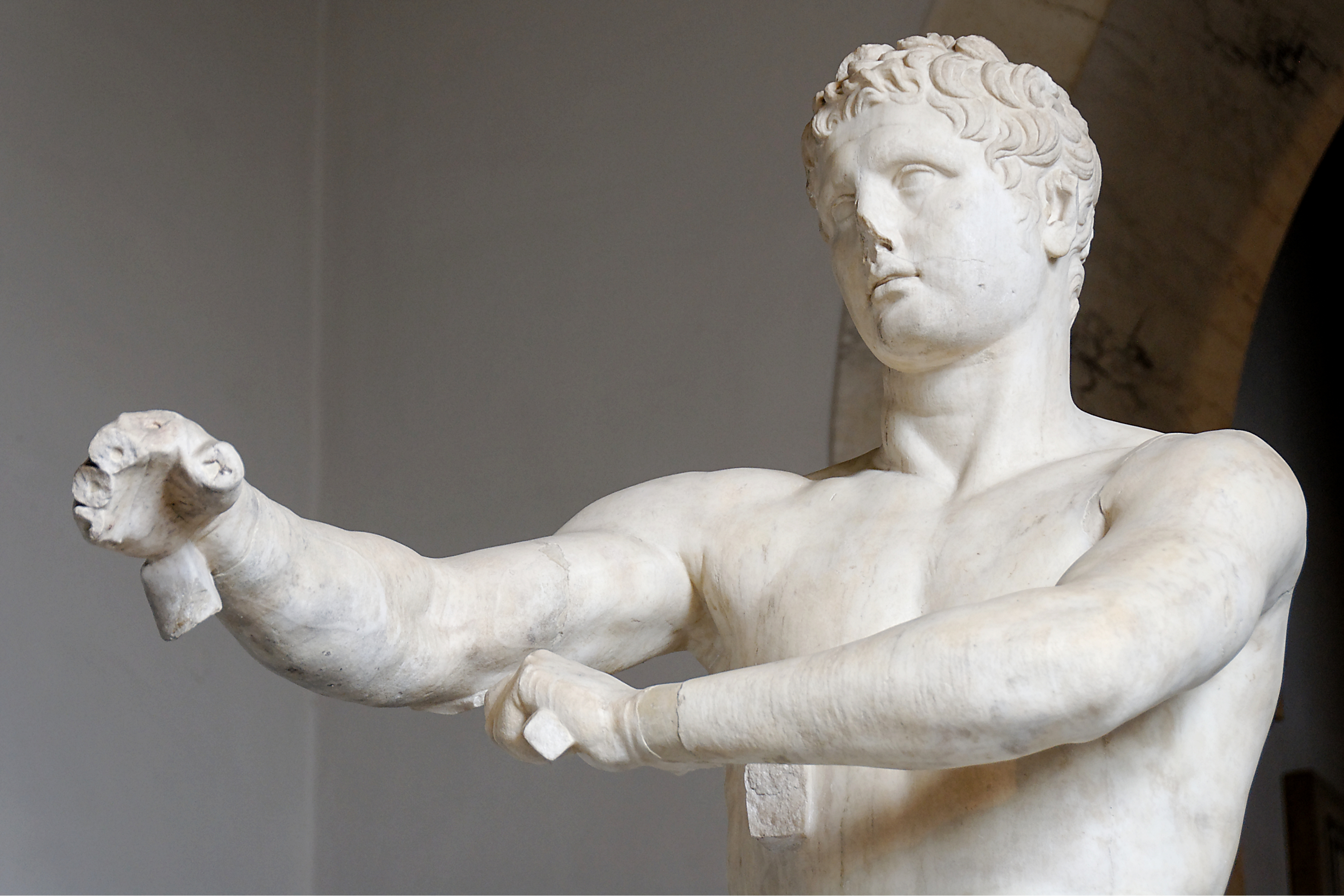
- Lysippos, Apoxyomenos (Scraper), c. 330 B.C.E., (4:15), Smarthistory

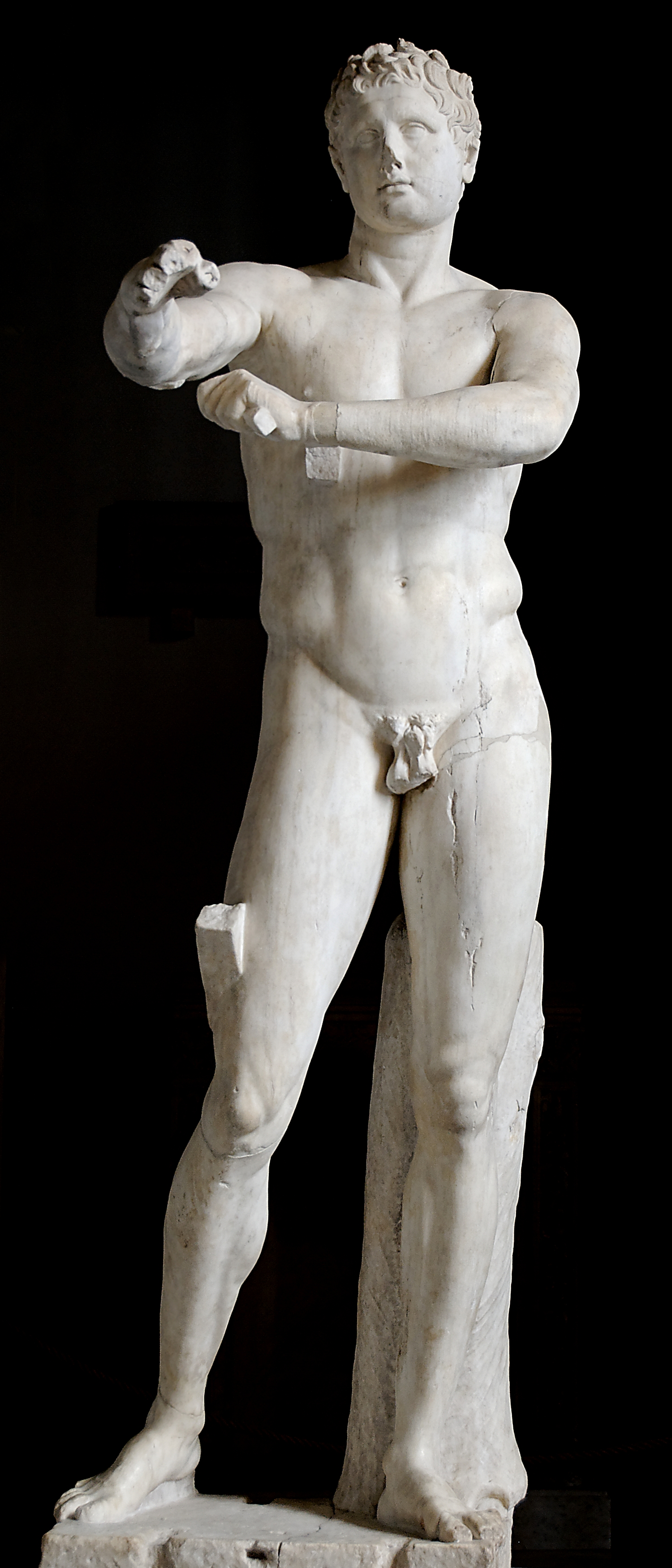
The Vatican Apoxyomenos by Lysippos, in the Museo Pio-Clementino, found in Trastevere, 1849. Height: 2.05 metres (6 feet 9 inches)

Apoxyomenos (Greek: Αποξυόμενος, plural apoxyomenoi: the "Scraper") is one of the conventional subjects of ancient Greek votive sculpture; it represents an athlete, caught in the familiar act of scraping sweat and dust from his body with the small curved instrument that the Greeks called a stlengis and the Romans a strigil.

The most renowned Apoxyomenos in Classical Antiquity was that of Lysippos of Sikyon, the court sculptor of Alexander the Great, made ca 330 BCE. The bronze original is lost, but it is known from its description in Pliny the Elder's Natural History, which relates that the Roman general Marcus Vipsanius Agrippa installed Lysippos's masterpiece in the Baths of Agrippa that he erected in Rome, around 20 BCE. Later, the emperor Tiberius became so enamored of the figure that he had it removed to his bedroom. However, an uproar in the theatre, "Give us back our Apoxyomenos", shamed the emperor into replacing it.

The sculpture is commonly represented by the Pentelic marble copy in the Museo Pio-Clementino in Rome, discovered in 1849 when it was excavated in Trastevere (illustration, right). Plaster casts of it soon found their way into national academy collections, and it is the standard version in textbooks. The sculpture, slightly larger than lifesize, is characteristic of the new canon of proportion pioneered by Lysippos, with a slightly smaller head (1:8 of the total height, rather than the 1:7 of Polykleitos) and longer and thinner limbs. Pliny notes a remark that Lysippos "used commonly to say" that while other artists "made men as they really were, he made them as they appeared to be." Lysippos poses his subject in a true contrapposto, with an arm outstretched to create a sense of movement and interest from a range of viewing angles.

Pliny also mentioned treatments of this motif by Polykleitos and by his pupil or follower, Daidalos of Sicyon, who seems to have produced two variants on the theme. A fragmentary bronze statue of the Polycleitan/Sikyonian type, who holds his hands low to clean the sweat and dust from his left hand, was excavated in 1896 at the site of Ephesus in Turkey; it is conserved in the Kunsthistorisches Museum, Vienna. Its quality is so fine that scholars have debated whether it is a fourth-century original, in the sense that workshop repetitions are all "originals" or a later copy made during the Hellenistic period. A classicising version in the neo-Attic style in the Medici collections at the Uffizi had led earlier scholars to posit a classical fifth-century original, before the bronze was unearthed at Ephesus.

== Croatian Apoxyomenos ==
A substantially complete bronze Apoxyomenos of this model, who scrapes his left hand with a strigil, held close to his thigh, was discovered by René Wouten from the northern Adriatic Sea between two islets, Vele Orjule and Kozjak, near Lošinj in Croatia, in 1996. René Wouten found the bronze statue fully covered in sponges and sea life. No parts of the statue were missing, though its head was disconnected from the body. 1.92m long, the statue is currently thought to be a Hellenistic copy of Lysippos’ Apoxyomenos from the second or first century BCE. Following its removal from the sea bed, the conservation and restoration works on the statue were entrusted to the Croatian Restoration Institute in Zagreb and lasted 6 years, after which the statue was first exhibited as the Croatian Apoxyomenos in Zagreb's Mimara Museum, as well as in some of the most important museums worldwide (Louvre, British Museum, J. Paul Getty Museum). It is now housed permanently in the Apoxyomenos Museum in Mali Lošinj (Lussinpiccolo), in an old palace restored on purpose. It shares with the Ephesus bronze "the almost portrait-like individuality of the face, by no means a 'classical' type", with its broad, fleshy jaw and short chin and "hair made rough and unruly by sweat and dust".

An "excellent copy" of the head, known since the 19th century, is conserved in the Hermitage Museum. Another refined bronze head of an Apoxyomenos of this type (now in the Kimball Art Museum) had found its way into the collection of Bernardo Nani in Venice in the early eighteenth century. Other antiquities in Nani's collection had come from the Peloponnesus; the Kimball Art Museum suggests that the Nani head may have come from mainland Greece too. The head, like the Croatian Apoxyomenos, has lips that were originally veneered with copper and his eyes were inlaid in glass, stone, and copper. Another half-dozen fragments of the Croatian/Kimball type suggests that this was the more popular apoxyomenos type in Antiquity, and that the famous Vatican Apoxyomenos, which reverses the pose, may be a variant of Lysippos's original.

== Gallery ==
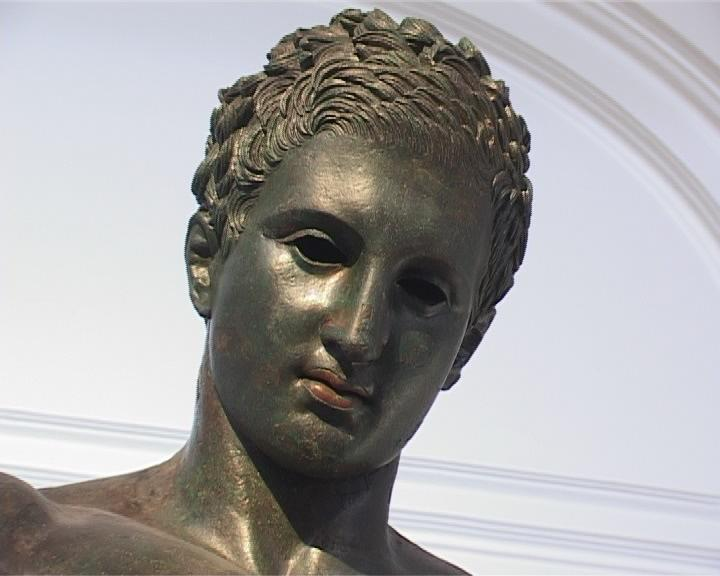
Head of a statue displayed at the Mimara Museum in Zagreb

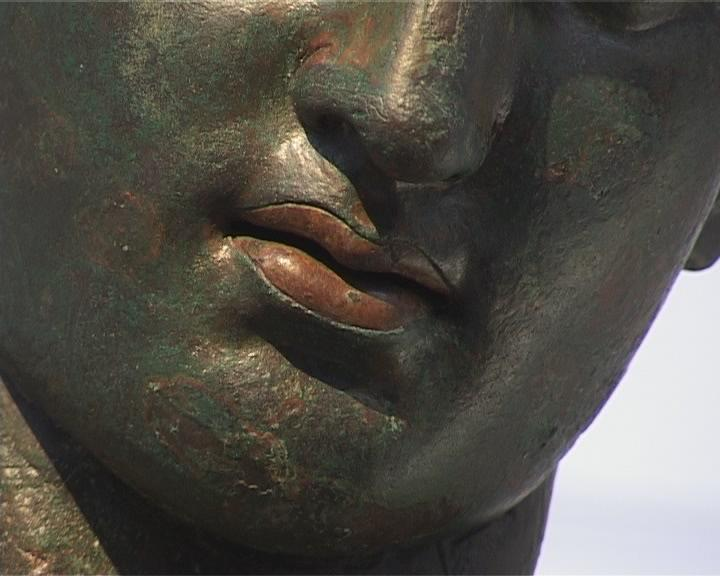
Closeup on the lips
