= Baths of Agrippa =

Ancient Roman bath, a landmark of Rome, Italy

- Thermae Agrippa
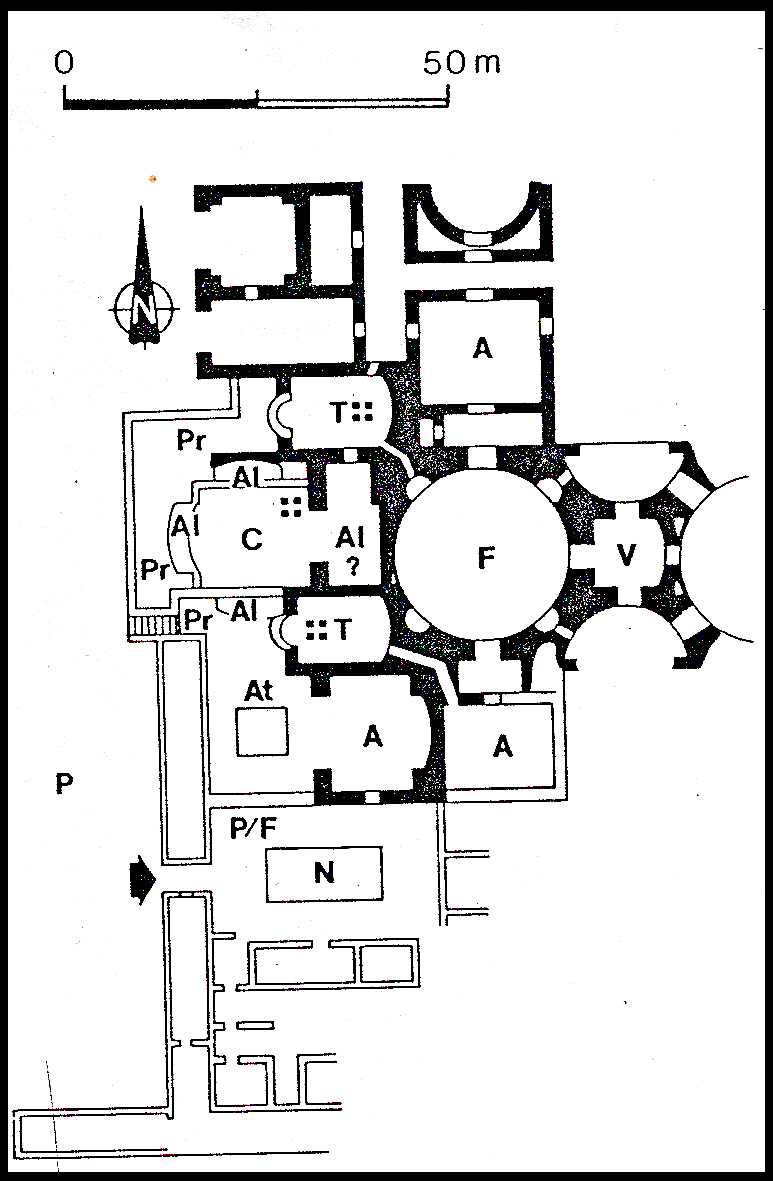
- Plan of the Baths of Agrippa
- Click on the map for a fullscreen view
- 41°53′48.86″N 12°28′37.19″E
- Location: Rome, Italy

History
- Built: 25 B.C.

Site notes
- Area: 10,000 m^{2} (110,000 sq ft)

The Baths of Agrippa (Latin: Thermae Agrippae) was a structure of ancient Rome, Italy, built by Marcus Vipsanius Agrippa. It was the first of the great thermae constructed in the city, and also the first public bath.

The remains were incorporated into more modern buildings including the massive 25 m diameter wall that was part of the hall. Old plans drawn by Peruzzi and Palladio record the remains from the period when much was still intact.

== History ==
In the bath's first form, completed in 25 BC, it was a hot-air room also known as a "laconian sudatorium or gymnasium". With the completion of the Aqua Virgo in 19 BC, the baths were supplied with water and with the addition of a large lake and canal (Stagnum Agrippae).

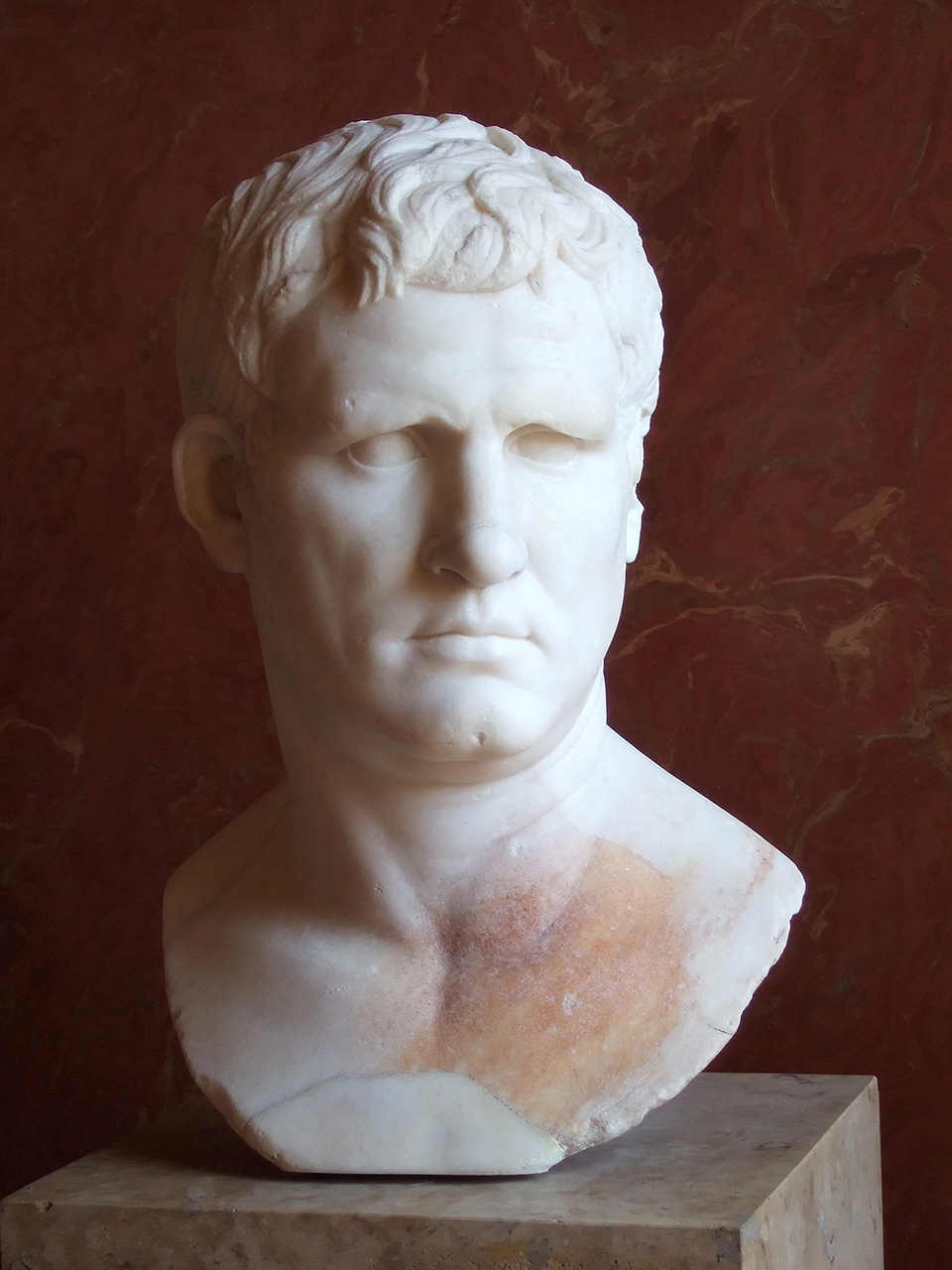
Marble portrait head of Marcus Vipsanius Agrippa, currently in the Louvre

Between the construction and Agrippa's death in 12 BC, the Baths were open to the public with an entrance fee charge. This charge was typically a quadrans. Upon his death, Agrippa left the baths to the citizens of Rome to use free of charge in exchange for donating various estates to Augustus, creating the first public bath structure.

The Baths of Agrippa were damaged along with many other structures by a large fire in AD 80, but were restored shortly thereafter by Domitian.

The thermae were enlarged under Hadrian in the second century AD and later by the emperors Constantius and Constans in the fourth century AD. Sidonius Apollonaris mentions that the Baths of Agrippa were still being used in the fifth century.

In 599, Pope Gregory I transformed the Baths into a nunnery.

In the 7th century the structure (no longer in use after the Ostrogoths cut off the Roman aqueducts in the 530s) was being mined for its building materials, but much of the Baths were still standing in the 16th century, when the ruins were drawn by Baldassare Peruzzi and Andrea Palladio, among others.

Today just part of the circular wall of the rotunda remains.

== The baths ==
The first version of the Baths of Agrippa, also known as the Laconicum, was finished in 25 BC. A laconicum appears to have been an earlier version of a heated bath which was also associated with a running track and exercise facilities for youths. Dio tells us that they “gave the name Laconian to the gymnasium because the Lacedaemonians had a greater reputation at that time than any one else for stripping and exercising after anointing themselves with oil”. Agrippa also dedicated his Pantheon, the original structure where the current Trajanic reconstruction sits, in the same year. In fact, Cassius Dio claims that three structures were completed by Agrippa in this year, the third being the Stoa of Neptune, suggesting that all three were related.

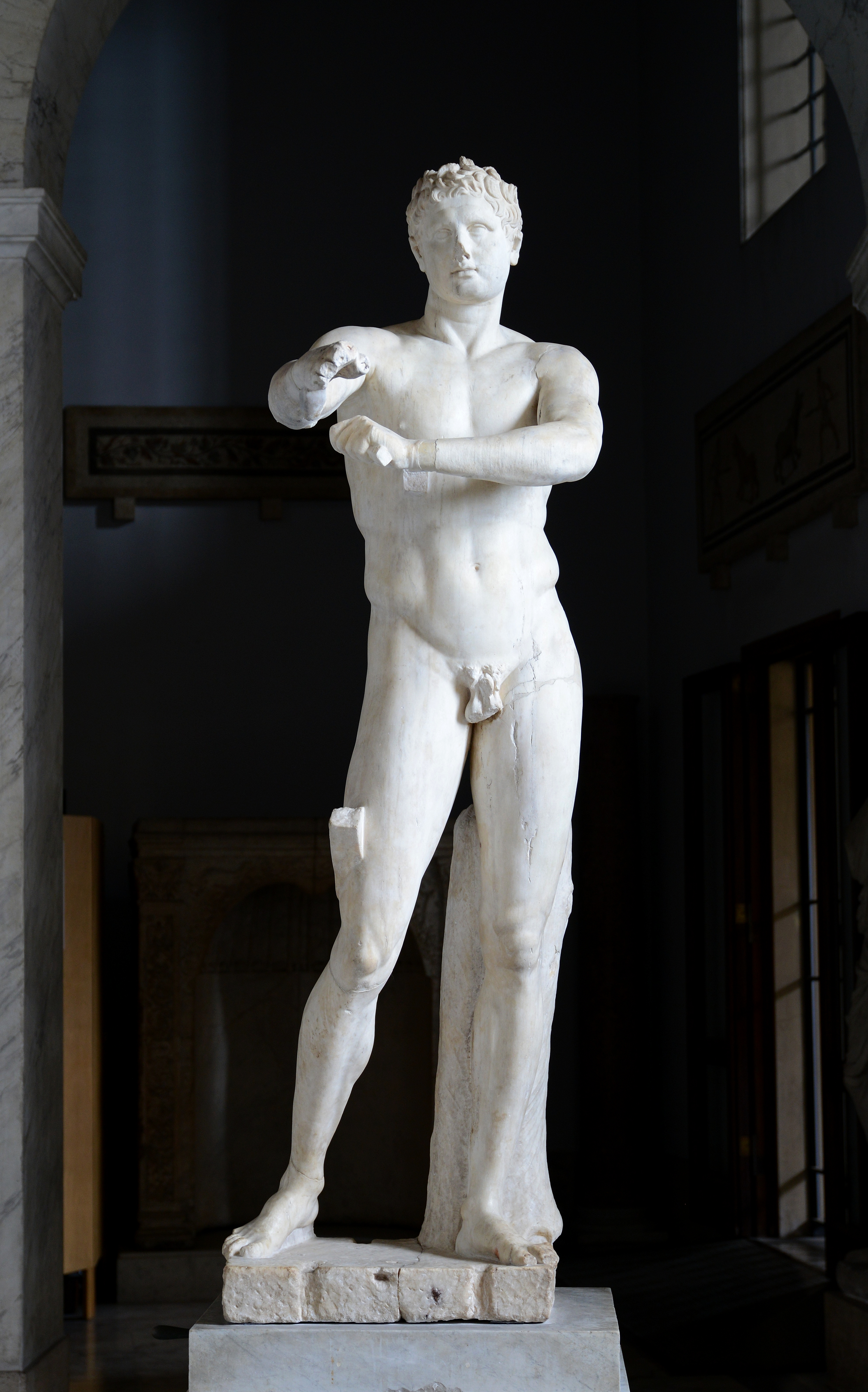
Marble copy of the Apoxyomenos of Lysippus (Pius Clementine Museum, Vatican)

The Baths of Agrippa are the first known to have contained monumental sculpture, including the famous Apoxyomenos of Lysippus, the famed court sculptor of Alexander the Great. In fact, Pliny the Elder mentions the baths several times, noting that they were "a point of departure in artistic endeavor, implying that the building was perceived as groundbreaking in certain respects".

The full version of the thermae, or Baths of Agrippa, did not come into use until after the completion of the Aqua Virgo in 19 BC. This new aqueduct was paid for by Agrippa himself and was one of a series of works connected with Roman water supply and sewers over which Agrippa seems to have had managerial control. The Aqua Virgo is still in use today after almost 2000 years, terminating, and currently supplying the waters to, the Trevi Fountain. These building projects were a few of the many which Agrippa undertook within the Roman Campus Martius and across the Empire, constituting aqueducts, fountains, porticoes, baths, roads, a voting precinct, a theatre, a bridge, and a harbour.

Agrippa built up the area around the complex to include gardens with nice walks and colonnades with resting places and shelters from the sun. Wright claims that "The total effect was somewhat like the Athenian gymnasia, the Lyceum, or the grove of Academus, but on a very much larger and more sumptuous scale." That the bath itself could have served a multitude of functions, serving as a type of club with “a restaurant, a reading-room, and a bathing establishment with every kind of bath then known, hot, tepid, cold, vapour, and shower”. Indeed, it would appear as though bathing had begun to become more complex around the time of the late Roman Republic going into the early Empire, introducing three different types of rooms and pools: the frigidarium (cold pool), the tepidarium (or lukewarm to room temperature pool), and the caldarium (hot room and pool). Whether or not the caldarium within the Baths of Agrippa contained window glass to sufficiently heat up the room and keep the heat in, as was the case within the Baths of Trajan and other later examples of Imperial bathing facilities, remains unknown due to the scant archaeological evidence of the site.

However, the baths, being a highly experimental project within the city of Rome, seem to have lacked a larger swimming pool, present in later Imperial bathing structures. It has been pointed out that this need could have been met with the man-made Stagnum (lake) of Agrippa or, more likely, the Euripus (canal) which allowed for runoff from the Stagnum to flow into the Tiber (please see below for more information on both the Stagnum and the Euripus).

Agrippa's baths, along with his other work within the Campus Martius, were burned down in the great fire of 80 AD in the reign of Titus. These appear to have been restored almost immediately during the reigns of either Titus or Domitian as Martial mentions they were often frequented. Repairs and rebuilding were completed again under the Antonines as well as the Severan emperors. There was a further reconstruction during the reign of Constantius and Constans in 354–355 AD which was noted on an inscription found near Santa Maria in Monterone, found not far from the west side of the baths.

== Structure and location ==
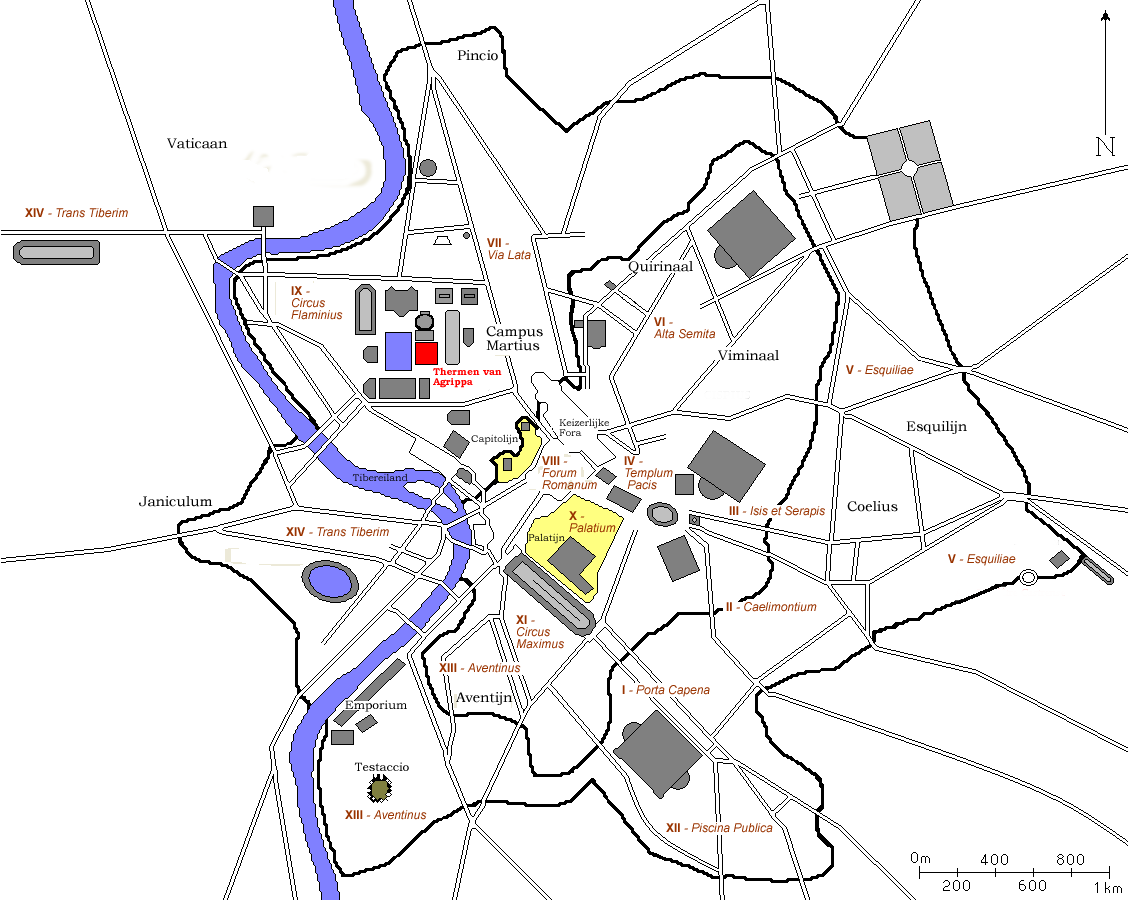
Map of the Roman Campus Martius. Highlighted in red are the Baths of Agrippa.

Knowledge of the structure and location of the Baths of Agrippa is based on a small fragment of the Marble Plan that was discovered in 1900 as well as drawings made in the 16th century of the ruins while they were still standing. Today scant archaeological evidence of the Baths remains.

It was constructed on the Campus Martius along with the original Pantheon under Agrippa's large building program. The area covered by the structure was about 110 meters North/South and 90 meters East/West. Along with the rest of Agrippa's buildings, the Baths were surrounded by gardens.

There was a large rotunda (Arco Della Ciambella) on the north side of the building 25 meters in diameter, that is visible in the sketches found in the seventeenth century. The dome was believed to be a social gathering spot for the bathers.

The area west of the rotunda had evidence of a hypocaust system and hollow terra-cotta tiles, indicating several heated rooms.

== Adornment ==
The baths were decorated with glazed terracotta tiles, paintings, and with the Apoxyomenos of Lysippus at the entrance.

== Bathing in the Roman world ==
By the late Republic and into the early Principate, bathing within Rome had started to become more complex: Imperial bathing structures, including those of Agrippa, became grander and more and complex. According to some, no public bathing complexes were built for some time as they were felt to host shady activities. Recent studies state that while the building of certain structures was considered virtuous (such as temples, fora, roads, and aqueducts), other structures (brothels, taverns, and other lowly structures) were symbolic of vice. It would appear that public baths occupied a middle ground, "standing somewhere between useful public monuments and lowly havens of corporeal dissipation". This is a likely explanation as to why there were no senatorially decreed bathing complexes during the Republic. Although senators likely did not avoid the baths altogether, they did not want to spend public money on their construction.

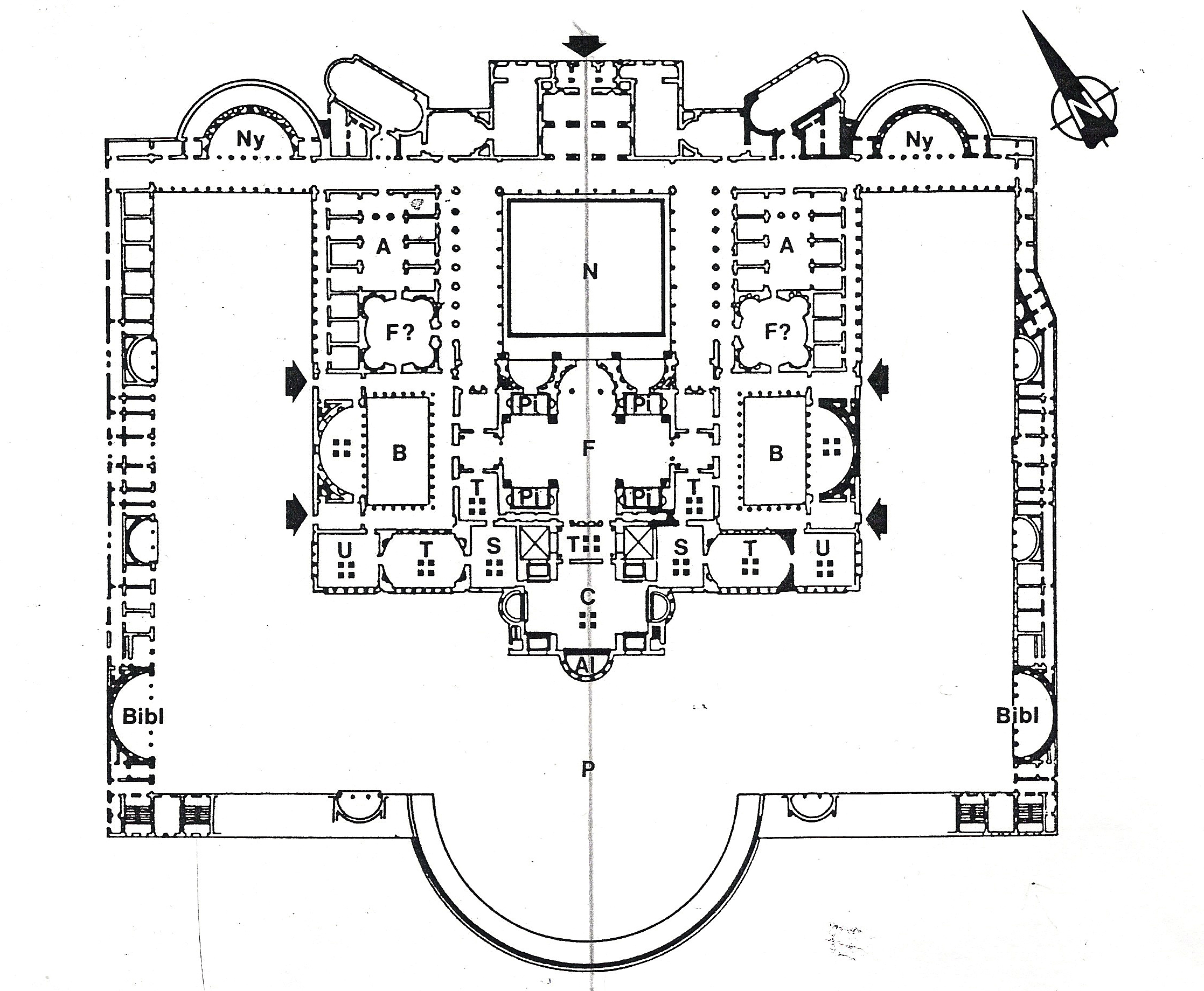
The later Baths of Trajan showing the frigidarium (N), the tepidarium (F), and the caldarium (C), a form which became popular in the late Republic to early Principate. Whether or not the Baths of Agrippa were symmetrical remains unknown due to the scant archaeological evidence which has survived.

Before the completion of the Bath of Agrippa, during the Republic, water brought into the city via one of its many aqueducts was not used for baths. Owners of private bathing complexes were forced to purchase water which had run off from publicly accessible troughs. Marcus Vipsanius Agrippa innovated here as well, servicing his baths with water fed directly from his freshly built aqueduct, the Aqua Virgo. However, the Baths of Agrippa also began as a private bathing complex, paid for personally by Agrippa himself, who was, by this time, one of the most wealthy men in the Roman world. However, upon his death in 12 BC, the baths were bequeathed to the Roman people in Agrippa's will, making it the first public bathing complex in the city of Rome (although not the first in the Empire). This action caused a change in attitudes within the Senate towards bathing complexes, removing their construction from the grey area and placing them into the realm of virtuous structures, although Agrippa's example was not repeated until Nero constructed his baths in the early to mid 60s AD. Indeed, it would seem as though the technological achievement of the baths was not lost on the Roman people, being able to control and contain vast amounts of water and even control the desired temperature at which certain pools were kept.

Evidence suggests that bathing became much more popular within Rome during the first century BC, when far greater numbers of Romans began bathing in public with more frequency. These numbers again drastically increased during the first century AD. A passage within Varro states that when baths were originally introduced within the city of Rome there were separate sections for men and women, which is hinted at archaeologically within Republican baths, which often feature an architectural division. In a passage of Cicero, detailing a particularly heated exchange between L. Licinius Crassus and M. Junius Brutus, it is brought to light that it was considered improper at the time for father and son to bathe together. However, the passage also indicates that, although the senators were not building baths at the time, they were still frequenting the private bath houses.

A trip to the Baths of Agrippa, along with other private baths, was meant to be a pleasurable experience. According to Lucian, commenting on a trip to the Baths of Hippias, they were "brightly lit throughout, adorned with marbles from Phrygia and Numidia, and inscribed with citations from Pindar". There appears one inscription that mentions a museum which was attached to a bathing complex where art was put on display and where discussions and lectures could be organized. Indeed, the baths of Rome have been recognized as social hubs within the Roman world, where members of the senatorial class would rub shoulders with the lower classes of society, even slaves, marking a strangely egalitarian feature of Roman life.

The Baths of Agrippa appear to have featured the main three types of pools and rooms which were the staple of Roman baths: frigidarium (cold pool), tepidarium (mild/tepid pool), and caldarium (hot room and pool). There is research that suggests that these rooms could be visited in both orders, going from cold to hot, or hot to cold. The hottest of the rooms, the caldarium, would have relied on a system of underfloor heating, created by fanning hot air from fires underneath the water basin, as well as heat from the sun, a feature which exploded after window glass became increasingly popular throughout Rome. It has also been suggested that the ringing of a bell (tintinnabulum) may have communicated to nearby Romans that the hot pools were open. However, this has also been criticized for various reasons of practicality, preferring the more reasonable explanation that bells were used to mark the imminent closing of the bathing complex.

Baths in the Roman world were a one-stop-shop of socialization, health, and entertainment; where one could exercise, play sports or ball games, play board games, philosophize, create business arrangements, and wash away the dirt and grime of everyday life within ancient Rome. There is no doubt that these complexes were microcosms of Roman life and even potentially small embodiments of the Roman world itself.

== The Aqua Virgo ==
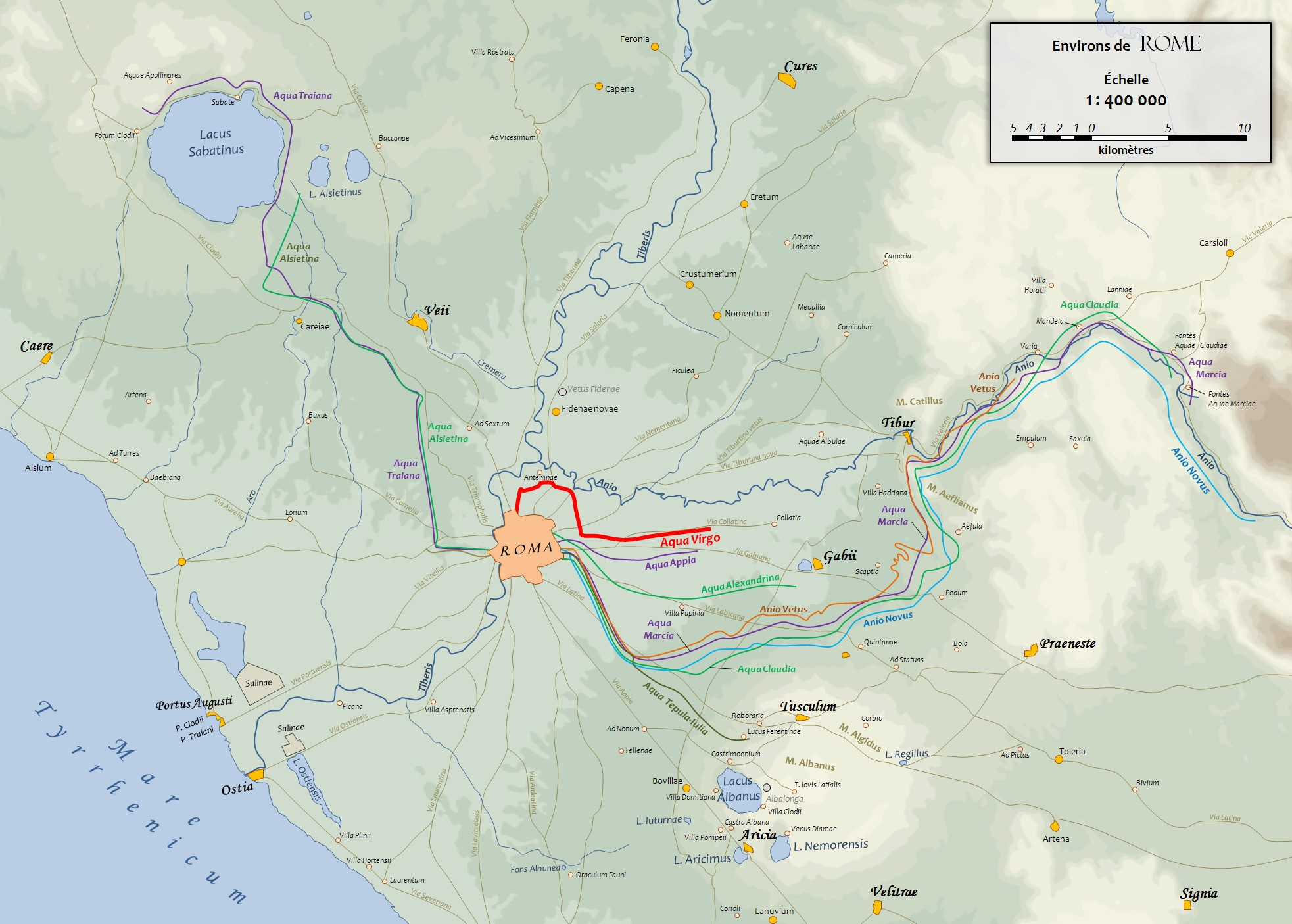
Route of the Aqua Virgo to Rome.

The Aqua Virgo was completed in 19 BC and was the last of a series of constructions initiated by Agrippa concerning water management within the city of Rome. Without a proper water supply the Baths of Agrippa would not have been able to function. The Aqua Virgo provided this water, along with supplying regions VII, IX, and XIV. This complemented the Aqua Julia which Agrippa also built in 33 B.C. to supply regions II, III, V, VI, VIII, X, and XII.

The source of the water transported by the aqueduct was located within the villa of Lucullus, 8 miles from the city along the Via Collatina. In antiquity, the Aqua Virgo travelled past the Baths of Agrippa, bringing water as far as the Trans Tiberim (across the Tiber), potentially using the Pons Agrippae (Bridge of Agrippa) to do so. Today the Aqua Virgo is still in use, almost 2000 years after its initial opening, terminating at, and supplying the waters for, the Trevi Fountain.

== Euripus ==
The Euripus was a canal which ran from the area of the Stagnum and drained into the Tiber. It was originally thought that Agrippa's lake was fed exclusively by the Aqua Virgo, using the canal to drain the lake directly into the Tiber. However, Strabo's mention of Agrippa setting up a statue (“The Fallen Lion” of Lysippus) in a grove which lay between the Stagnum and the Euripus leads one to believe that the two were actually distinct features of the landscape. Therefore, it seems likely that the canal was indeed fed exclusively by the Aqua Virgo with water that was mentioned to have been quite cold. In fact, Frontinus mentions that the waters were given to the Euripus by the Aqueduct which gave it its name, Euripus Virginis, essentially meaning the canal of the Aqua Virgo. Seneca also stated that he enjoyed bringing in the new year with a good-luck plunge into the Virgo, which he did in the Euripus. Thus, as Lloyd has suggested, the Euripus could have served as a cold plunge-pool for the Baths of Agrippa. The large size of the Euripus could also imply that it could have stood in as a swimming area for the baths.

== Stagnum ==
The Stagnum, along with the Euripus were very likely added into the landscape as features to complement the pleasure gardens which Agrippa placed around his baths. The lake is most often placed to the west of the bath structure and, as previously mentioned above, there are, in fact, no references to anyone swimming in the Stagnum, using it in lieu of the lacking swimming pool in the bath structure. Some theories postulate the lake was lined with quays, suggesting that boating on the lake may have been popular. The Stagnum may have been fed by runoff waters from the baths. This runoff of used water would certainly have dissuaded people from swimming in the lake. However, it might appear more likely to some that the Aqua Virgo fed most of the water into the lake.

The Stagnum was indeed quite large, being able to host a large banquet for Nero, hosted by Tigillinus, which was held on a raft towed by other boats. The lake could also have served a more practical purpose, serving as a drainage area for the low-lying region of the Campus Martius, which was prone to flooding throughout antiquity.

== See also ==
- Baths of Caracalla – Ancient Roman bath, a landmark of Rome, Italy
- List of Roman public baths

Preceded by Cloaca Maxima	Landmarks of Rome; Baths of Agrippa	Succeeded by Baths of Caracalla
