= Santa Maria in Monterone =

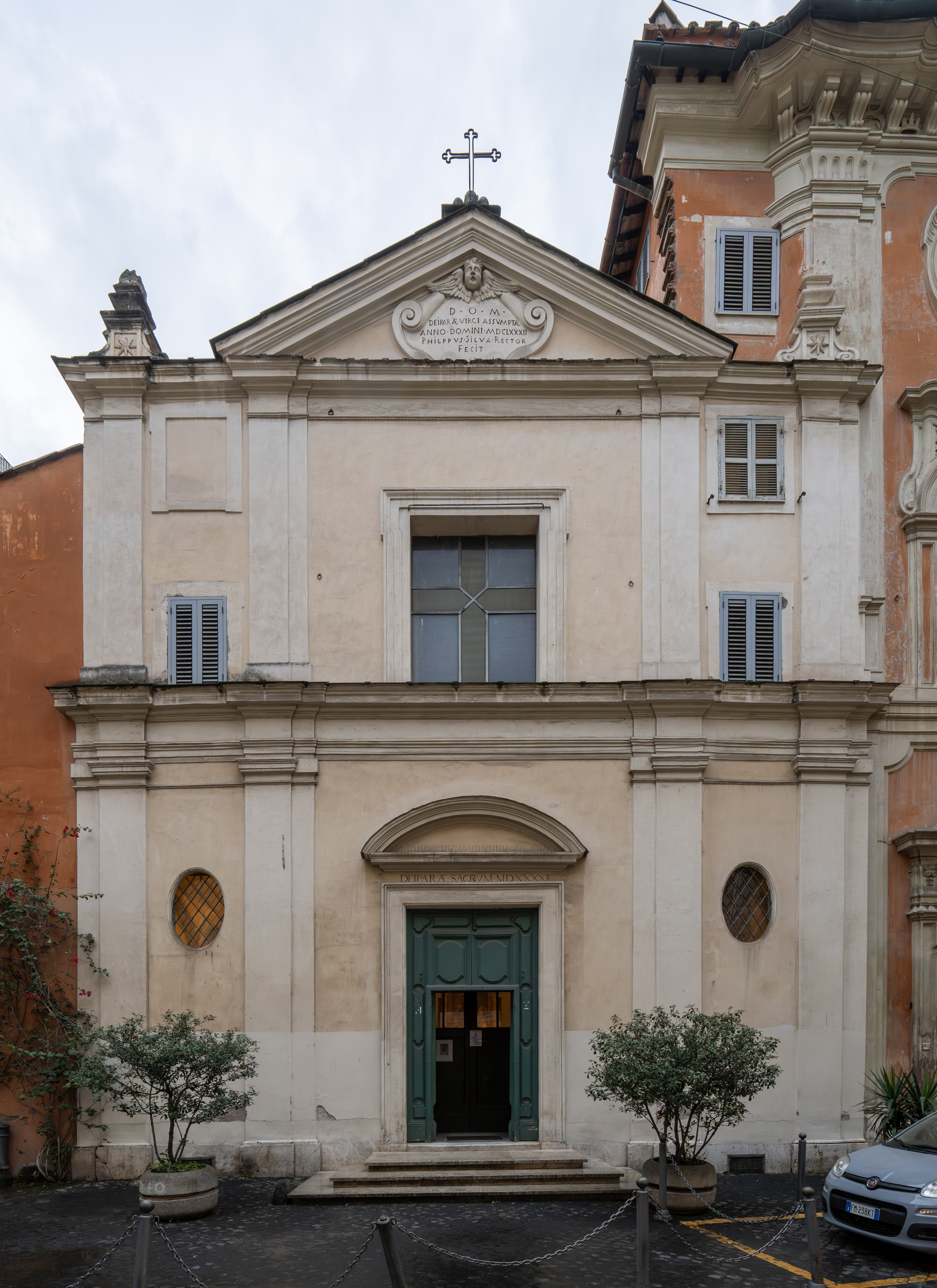
- Santa Maria in Monterone.
- Click on the map for a fullscreen view
- 41.89673°N 12.47571°E
- Location: Via Santa Maria in Monterone, Rome
- Country: Italy
- Denomination: Roman Catholic
- Religious institute: Redemptorists

Architecture
- Architectural type: Church

Santa Maria in Monterone is a Roman Catholic church in Rome, Italy. Its suffix originates from the Sienese Monteroni family, whose patronage rebuilt the church and built a small hospice next to it for pilgrims from Siena. It is located on Via Santa Maria in Monterone in the Sant'Eustachio rione. Next to the church is a Redemptorist monastery, whose clergy manage the church.

== History ==
Its origins are unknown but it may first have been housed in the ruins of a 1st-century BC pagan temple or in the area around the stagnum Agrippae, after which the surrounding region is given its suffix "della Valle". The church first appears in the documentary record in an 1186 bull of pope Urban III, which mentions it as one of the daughter-churches of San Lorenzo in Damaso. It was restored in 1245 and 1597 - during the latter restoration it was raised after its repeated flooding by the river Tiber.

Pope Clement X granted the painting a decree of Canonical coronation and it took place on 1676.

Under pope Innocent XI it was completely rebuilt in 1682. It remained a parish church until pope Leo XII (1823–29), when its parish was transferred to the nearby church of Sant'Eustachio. Once belonging to the Mercederians, it was transferred in the 19th century to the order of the Blessed Alfonso Liguori.

== Description ==
The building has three naves separated by ancient columns, each with an Ionic capital of a different design, first erected in the church in the medieval era. Its main altarpiece depicts a Madonna and Child with Saints Peter Nolasco and Peter Pascual by Pompeo Batoni. On the left hand side of the chancel is the baroque funerary monument of Cardinal Stefano Durazzo (1594–1667), who was once archbishop of Genoa; a skeletal memento mori holds a bas-relief portrait of the cardinal; the sculptor is unknown.

== Sources ==
- M. Armellini, Le chiese di Roma dal secolo IV al XIX, Rome 1891
- C. Hulsen, Le chiese di Roma nel Medio Evo, Florence 1927
- "F. Titi, Descrizione delle Pitture, Sculture e Architetture esposte in Roma, Rome 1763".
- C. Rendina, Le Chiese di Roma, Newton & Compton Editori, Milan 2000, p. 237
- G. Carpaneto, Rione VIII Sant'Eustachio, in AA.VV, I rioni di Roma, Newton & Compton Editori, Milan 2000, Vol. II, pp. 499–555
