= Croatian Apoxyomenos =

Ancient Greek bronze statue

- Hrvatski Apoksiomen (Croatian)
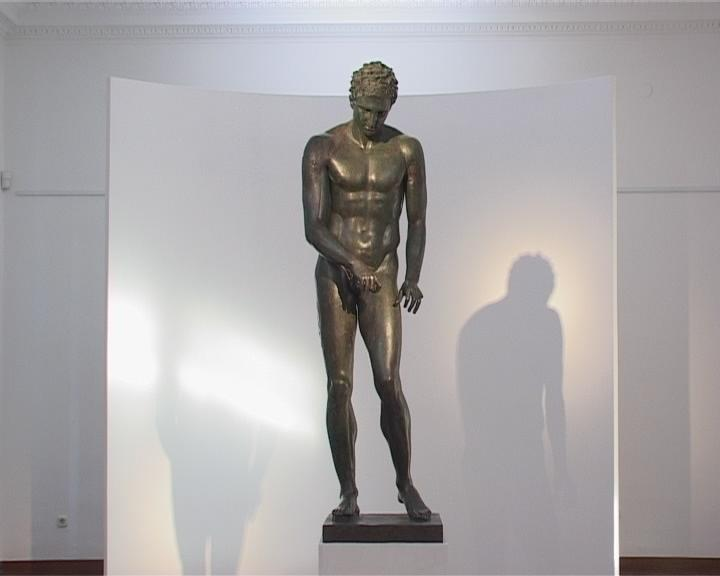
- Artist: Unknown
- Year: 2nd or 1st century BC
- Type: Statue
- Medium: Bronze
- Dimensions: 192 cm (76 in)
- Location: Museum of Apoxyomenos Mali Lošinj, Croatia

The Croatian Apoxyomenos (Croatian: Hrvatski Apoksiomen) is an Ancient Greek statue cast in bronze in the 2nd or 1st century BC; it was discovered in 1996 on the bottom of the sea near the Croatian islet of Vele Orjule, southeast of the island of Lošinj. It represents an athlete – Apoxyomenos ('the Scraper') – in the act of scraping sweat and dust from his body with the small curved instrument called a strigil.

After the Croatian Apoxyomenos was raised from the sea in 1999, it was extensively restored. It was not publicly displayed until 2006. It is the most complete and best preserved among eight known Apoxyomenos statues.

== Discovery ==
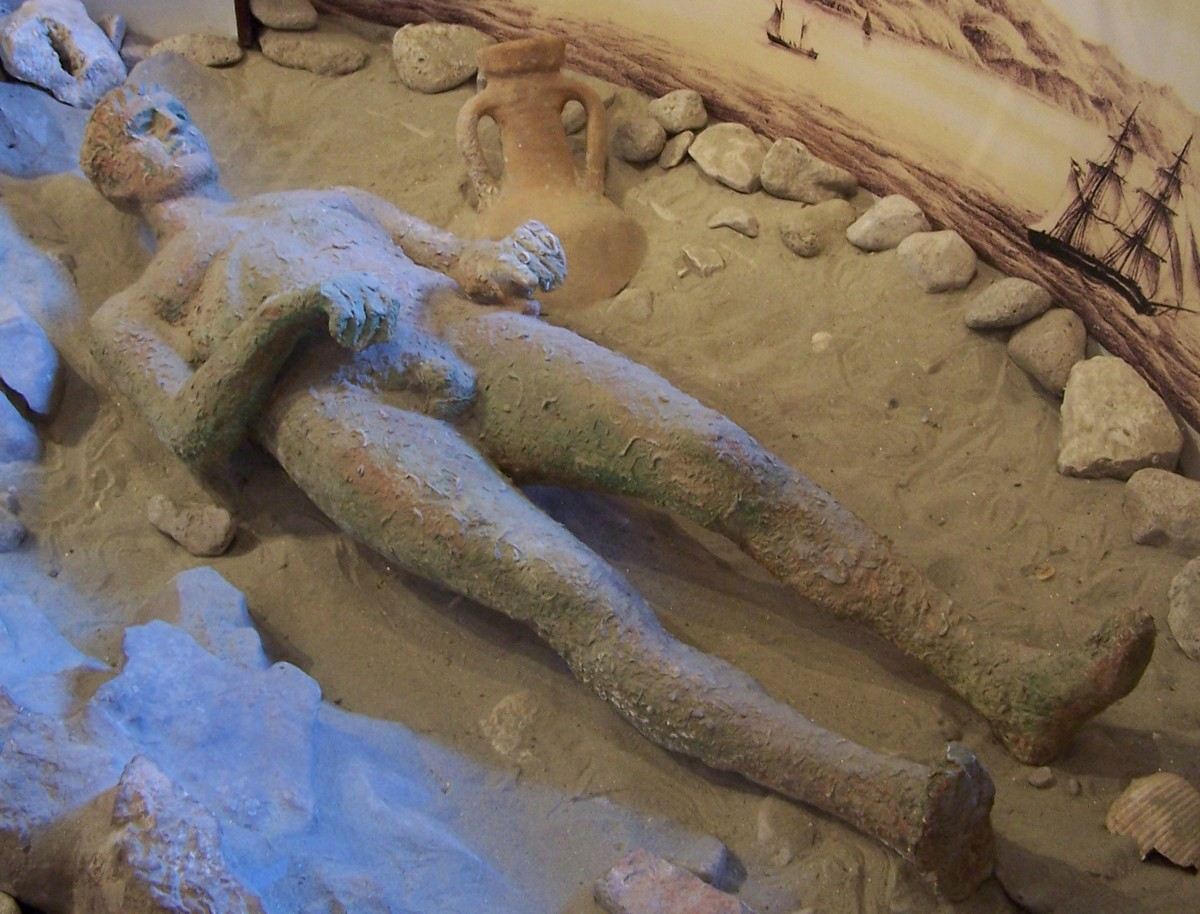
Replica showing how the statue appeared when it was found

Apoxyomenos was found in 1996 by Belgian tourist René Wouters in the sea near the islet of Vele Orjule, on the sandy bottom between two rocks at a depth of about 45 metres (148 ft). Wouters, an avid sports diver and amateur photographer who had been visiting Croatia and the island of Lošinj for several years, discovered the statue by chance during one of his dives. Wouters reported the find to the Croatian Ministry of Culture in 1998. He was present when a team of divers from the Ministry of Culture and Archaeological Museum in Zadar, the Special Police, and the Submar d.o.o., raised the statue from the sea on 27 April 1999.

== Restoration ==
When brought from the sea, Apoxyomenos was covered with marine organisms which had adhered to it. Scientists did not use chemical agents to remove them: instead, only mechanical precision hand tools (and the occasional machine) were used in the conservation process, which was the first of its kind in Croatia. Cracks and breaks were repaired, and a specially designed construction that supported the whole figure from the inside was made.

== Appearance and typology ==
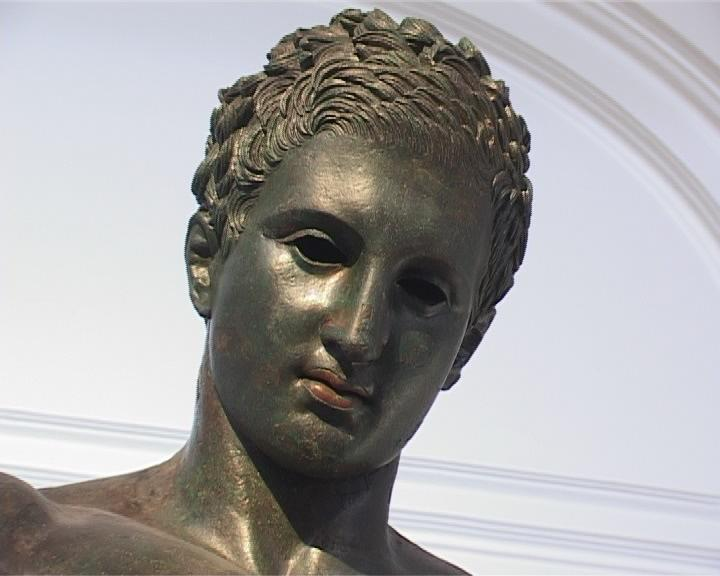
Head

Croatian Apoxyomenos is 6 feet 3.5 inches (1.92 m) high, and stands on a 10-centimetre (3.9 in) high original bronze base which is decorated with alternating square and swastika ornamentation. The alternating square-and-swastika is repeated three times on the sides of the base, four times on the front, while the back side of the base is undecorated. Art historians Nenad Cambi from Split and professor Vincenzo Saladino from the University of Florence believe that this bronze statue dates from 2nd or 1st century BC. The author is unknown, but the statue's beauty, as well as the quality of its casting, indicate a highly skilled craftsman.

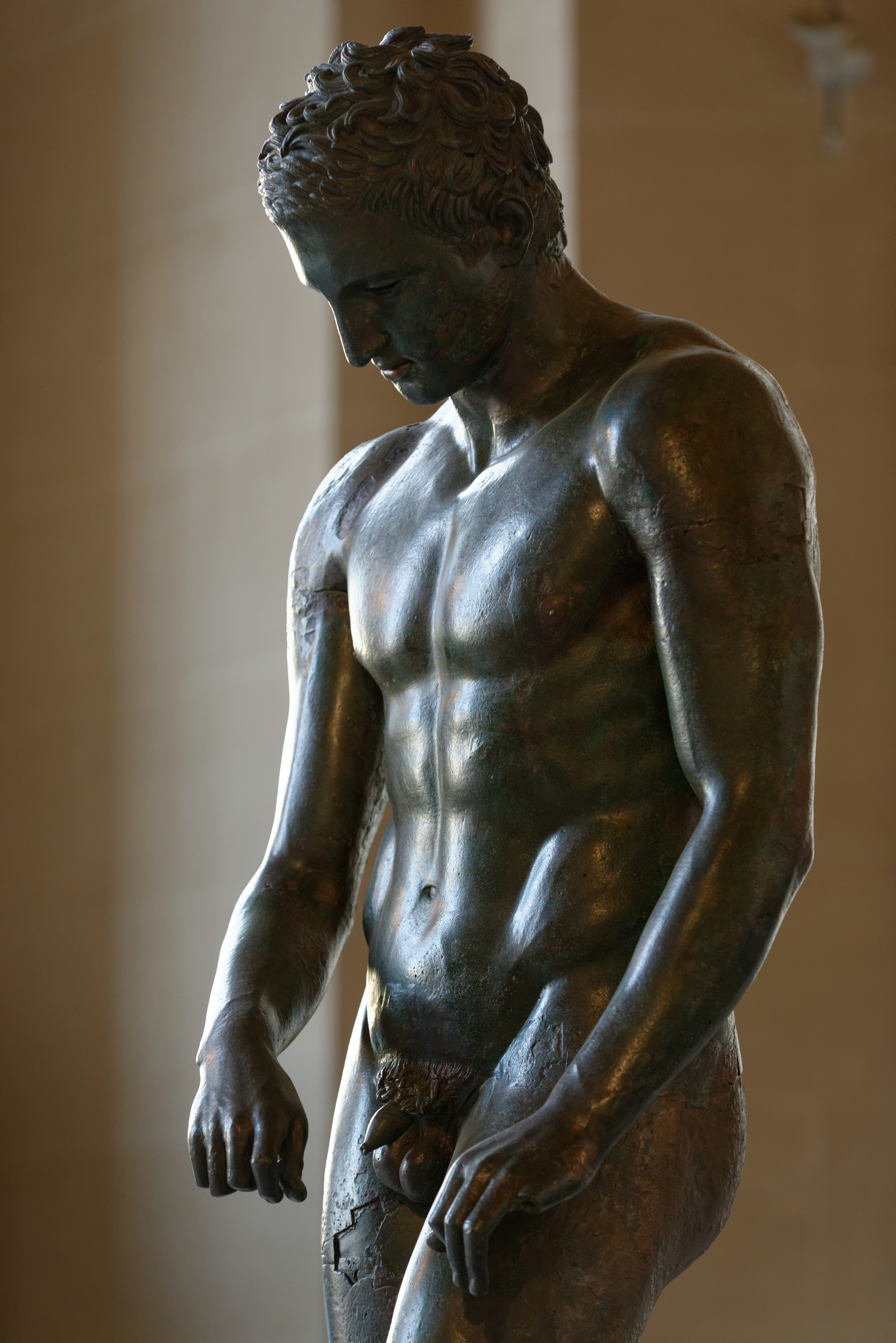
Torso

A similar statue was found in 1896 in Ephesus, in present-day Turkey, and is now held by the Kunsthistorisches Museum in Vienna. Croatian Apoxyomenos is different from the Vatican Apoxyomenos made by Lysippos, primarily because the Croatian keeps his hands at the level of the hip and not the forearm. A larger number of fragmentary finds of this type suggests the popularity of the figure in antiquity. The Vatican Apoxyomenos may have been created as a variation on the Lysippos theme style. Of the eight known Apoxyomenos statues, the Croatian one is the most complete and best preserved.

Art historian and professor Antun Karaman described Apoxyomenos:

Apoxyomenos' bronze glow flashes just like the last flashes of the Greek classical period when man, with the help of philosophy, begins to seek refuge in the invisible (Plato advocates an escape to the fold of higher consciousness), but also in a safe and solid shelter of knowledge (Aristotle's gnoseological thesis). Therefore, Apoxyomenos is dignified and calm. Viewing his perfect form, one can almost touch what would otherwise remain hidden from one's sight, which would be limited to the observation of external forms. Apoxyomenos and its sculptor stoically accept the relativity of the foundation of existence, because he lives in the midst of constant change. By accepting impermanence as an effective value and fact, he reveals buried emotions that tomorrow are going to rise to a boiling point in Hellenism.

== Analysis and open questions ==
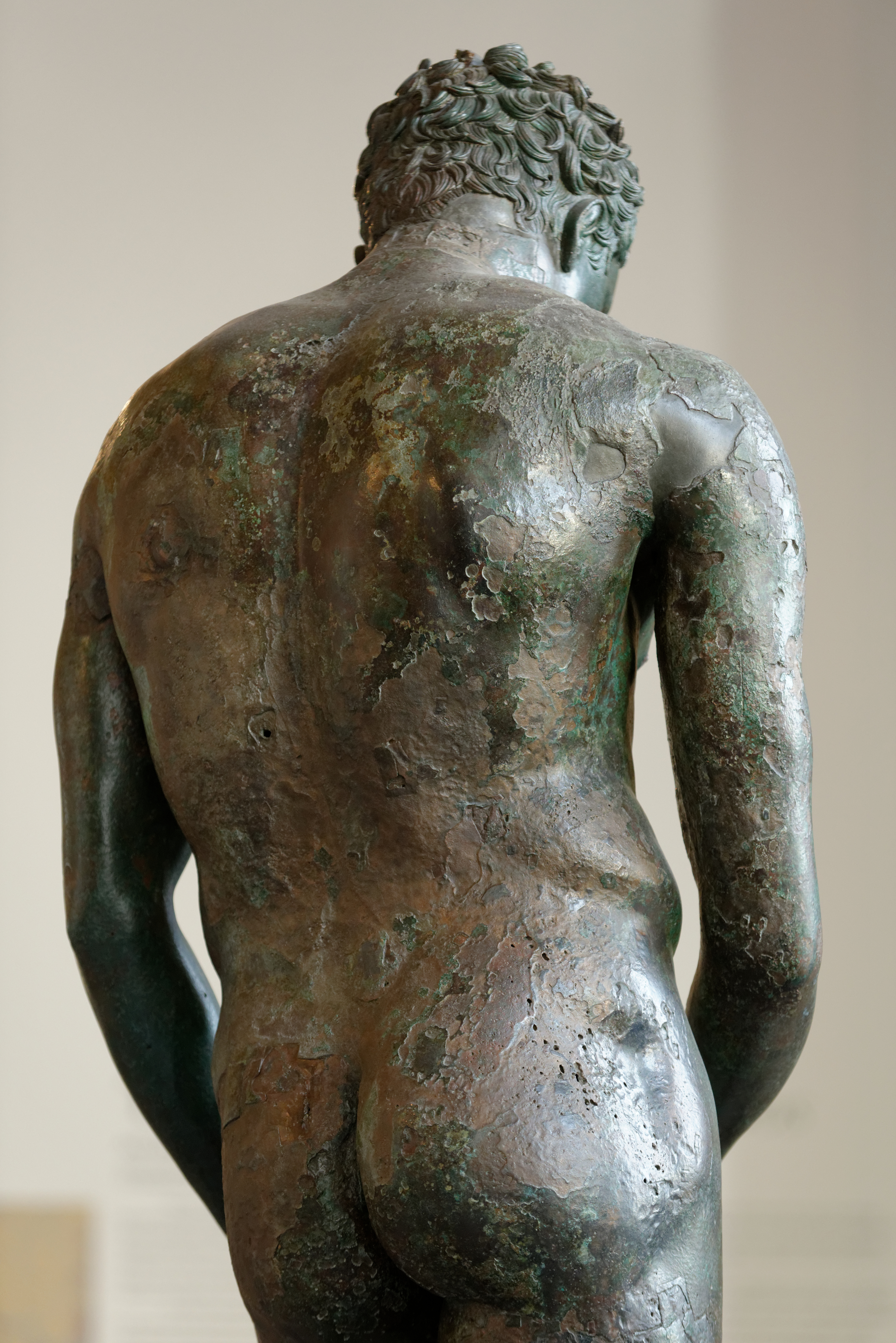
Back

Shards of wood, twigs, a few seeds of fruits, pitted olives and cherries, and the nest of a small rodent were found inside Apoxyomenos. Radiocarbon dating of organic material found inside the statue indicated that Apoxyomenos did not fall into the sea immediately after it was made, but, according to the results, sometime between 20 BC and 110 AD.

Extensive underwater search on an area of 50,000 square meters (540,000 sq.ft) around the find, using robotic probes and metal detectors, revealed fragments of the bronze base of the statue, a lead anchor bar, and some amphorae remains. Since the finds do not indicate a shipwreck, researchers believe that Apoxyomenos was thrown into the sea from a Roman merchant ship during a storm, but the reason remains a mystery.

At the beginning of 2nd century AD, this Apoxyomenos was already considered to be an antique. It may have been in the process of being transported to one of major cities in the Northern Adriatic, such as Aquileia, Trieste, Ravenna, Pula or Poreč. An early Roman villa with thermae in Verige Bay on the island of Veli Brijun is also one of the likely destinations.

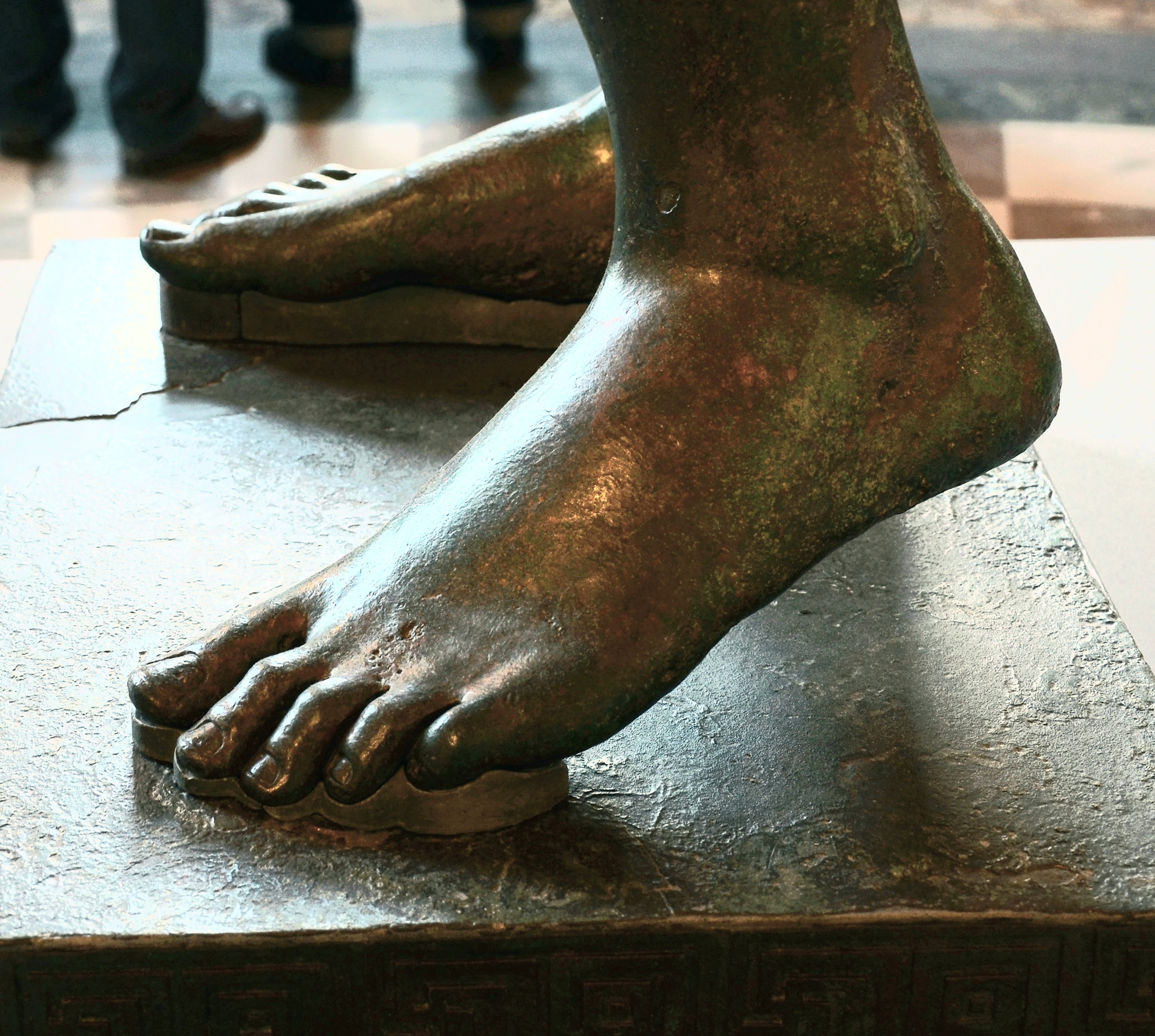
Base of the statue

Since the discovery, archaeologists are divided over the question of whether the model for the sculptor was left-handed or right-handed. While he was visiting the Apoxyomenos exhibition in Palazzo Medici Riccardi, Italian Education Minister Giuseppe Fioroni concluded that the model was left-handed. He based this on his observation that the left shoulder muscles of the model are more developed than those on the right.

Croatian archaeologist Nenad Cambi analysed the body type and proportions of the statue and concluded – based on the muscular development of the upper torso – that it most probably represents a wrestler.

Cambi has challenged the classification and naming of the sculpture. In his view, Apoxyomenos is not the correct name for the statue because the model is cleaning the scraping instrument, not his body. In this respect, this statue is different from the others, except for the Viennese one, found in 1896. Cambi believes that statue, too, is misclassified. Cambi argues that the correct name for the statue of this type would be the Strigil Cleaner.

== Exhibition ==
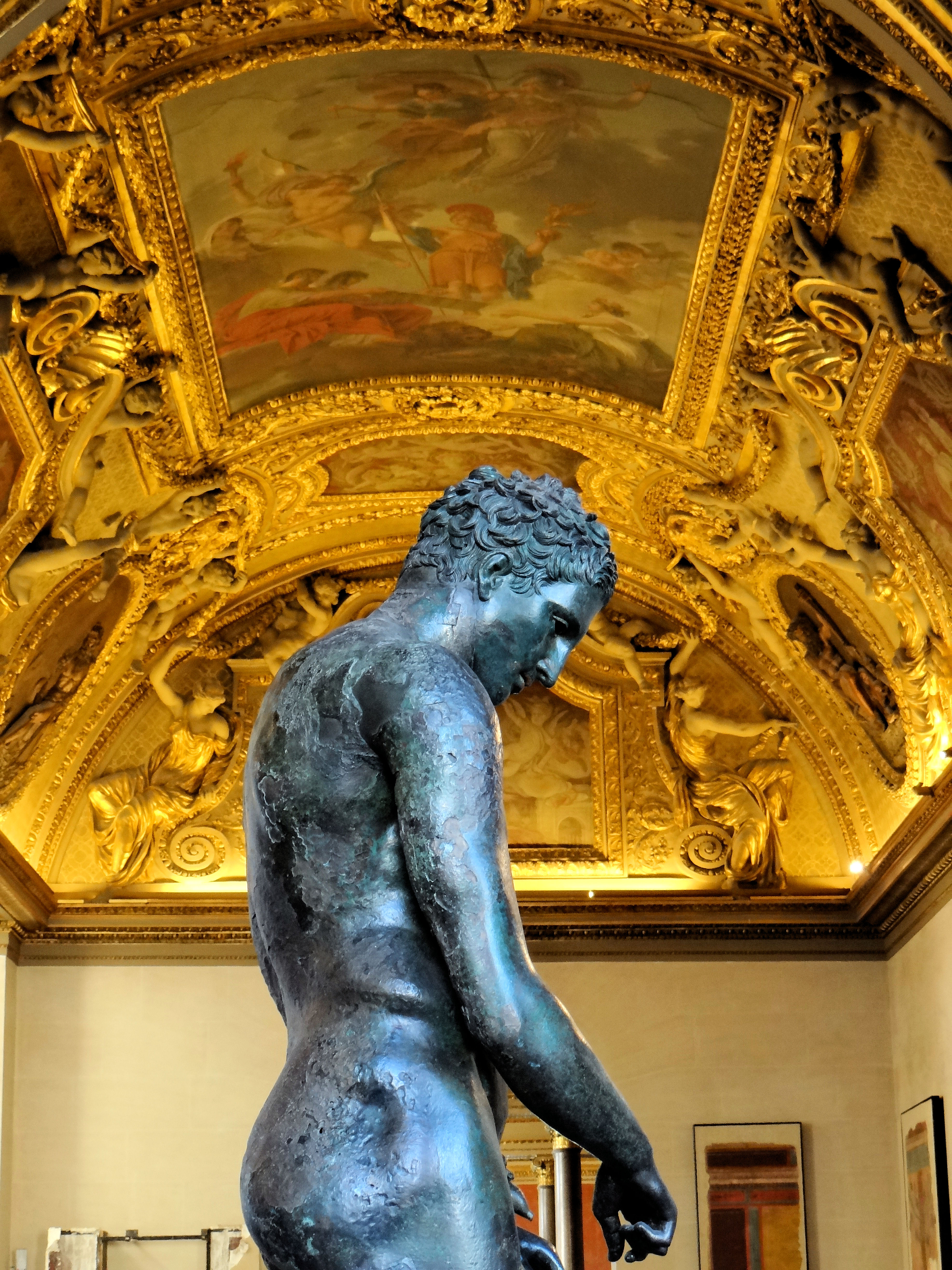
Apoxyomenos on the exhibition in Louvre, France

After years of desalination and careful restoration, Apoxyomenos was exhibited at the Archaeological Museum in Zagreb from 18 May to 17 September 2006. From 1 October 2006 to 30 January 2007, it was exhibited at the Italian Palazzo Medici Riccardi in Florence, where it was seen by around 80,000 people, "greatly increasing the number of visits to Palace". For the following two years, Apoxyomenos was returned to display at the Archaeological Museum in Zagreb.

In 2007, Apoxyomenos was awarded the Europa Nostra, European Union Prize for Cultural Heritage.

In February 2007, Croatian Prime Minister Ivo Sanader advocated moving Apoxyomenos to the island of Lošinj, the archipelago it was found in, but he left the final decision to the experts from the Council for Cultural Heritage. In October 2007, the Council unanimously decided that Apoxyomenos will be moved to the Apoxyomenos Museum that is being built as an addition to the historic Kvarner Palace in Mali Lošinj. This decision was supported by the Ministry of Culture.

As of 30 April 2016, the Apoxyomenos is being kept in the Museum of Apoxyomenos in Mali Lošinj. The cost of the museum, which has been under construction from 2009 until 2016, according to the plan of architects Saša Randić and Idis Turato, is around 20 million kuna (cca. €2.6 million).

Following its return to Zagreb in 2007, Apoxyomenos has been exhibited in many international museums, including the British Museum in London and J. Paul Getty Museum in Los Angeles:

- 21 February – 20 April 2008, Osijek, Osijek Archaeological Museum
- 28 April – 30 June 2008, Rijeka, Maritime and History Museum of the Croatian Littoral
- 8 July – 1 December 2008, Split, Split Ethnographic Museum
- 31 March – 7 September 2010, Zadar, Museum of Antique Glass
- 15 September 2010 – 30 January 2011, Zagreb, Klovićevi Dvori Gallery –
- 3 March – 30 May 2011, Ljubljana, Ljubljana City Museum
- 2 February – 4 November 2012, Zagreb, Mimara Museum.
- 22 November 2012 – 25 February 2013, Paris, Louvre Museum

== Literature ==
- Hrvatski Apoksiomen/The Croatian Apoxyomenos, exhibition catalogue, (ed.) M. Domijan, I. Karniš, Zagreb, 2006, second revised edition 2008
- Apoxyomenos: The Athlete of Croatia/Apoxyomenos: l'Atleta della Croazia, exhibition catalogue, (ed.) Maurizio Michelucci, Florence, 2006

== Sources ==
- Cambi, Nenad (October 2007). "Brončani kip čistača strigila iz mora kod otočića Vele Orjule blizu Lošinja" [A Bronze Statue of a Strigil Cleaner Found Underwater at the Islet of Vele Orjule near Lošinj] (PDF). Archaeologia Adriatica (in Croatian). 1 (1). University of Zadar, Department of Archaeology: 85–109. doi:10.15291/archeo.898.
