= Oil cleansing method =

Alleged skin-cleansing method

The oil cleansing method, often abbreviated as OCM, is a system for cleaning the human body. It is sometimes used for treating acne. Sometimes, oils can be mixed; one example is 50% extra virgin olive oil and 50% castor oil. This mixture can be optimized based on skin type and personal preference.

In accordance with skin type variations, castor oil may be too harsh in some skin-care regimens and is sometimes used in a 1:9 ratio. However, overly oily skin can make use of a larger proportion of castor oil. Other oils that are commonly used are jojoba oil, sweet almond oil, coconut oil, argan oil, rose hip seed oil, sunflower oil, safflower oil, and grapeseed oil. Furthermore, some sources say that the oil cleansing method is not viable for sensitive skin.

== History ==
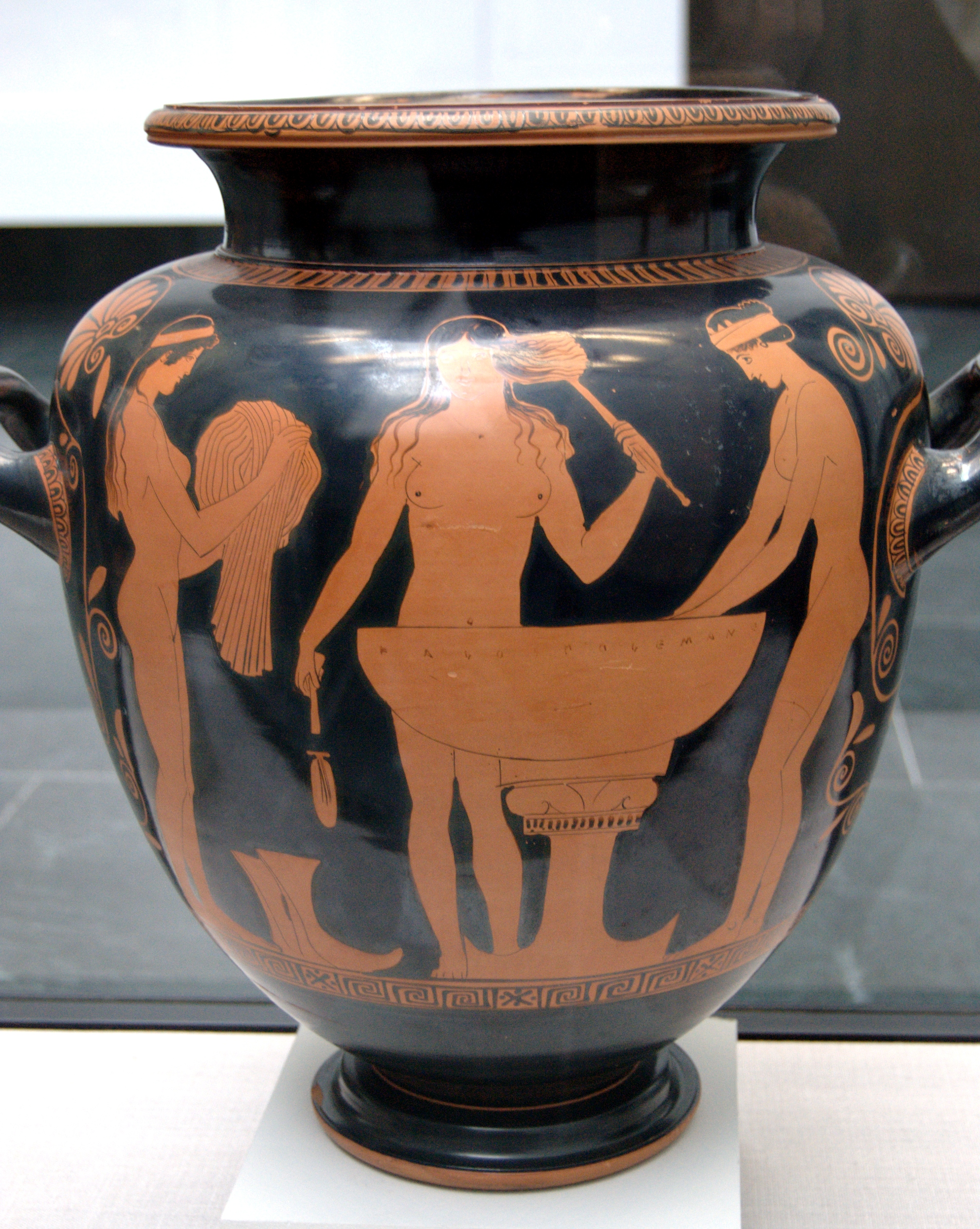
Stamnos women bath Staatliche Antikensammlungen 2411

The modern OCM method claims to be derived from ancient bathing practices. It differs from these practices in its focus solely on oil, and the ancients would also use water. Modern soap was not produced industrially until the 19th century. In the ancient world people would use olive oil as part of their bathing. They may have combined the oil with ash, and we know they used a scraping implement called a strigil.

In the Roman baths, a man would bathe in this way before taking a Caldarium or 'hot bath'. Pliny the Elder himself mentions ancient bathing practices.

== Method ==
In this beauty treatment, the oil is rubbed into skin for approximately two minutes. Next, a warm, damp microfiber wash cloth is used to wipe off the excess oil. Applied sparingly, oil may be used to moisturize the skin after the cleansing oil has been removed from the face.
