= Sveti Petar (island) =

Island in Croatia

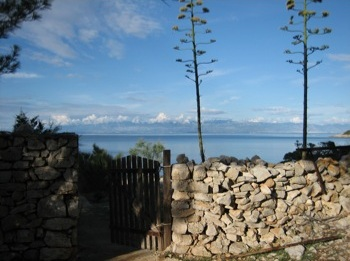
- Interactive map of Sveti Petar

Geography
- Location: Adriatic Sea
- Coordinates: 44°27′52″N 14°33′18″E
- Archipelago: Cres-Lošinj
- Area: 0.96 km^{2} (0.37 sq mi)
- Highest point: 62

Administration
- Croatia

Demographics
- Population: 0

Sveti Petar is an uninhabited Croatian island in the Adriatic Sea located east of Ilovik. Its area is 0.96 km^{2} (0.37 sq mi).

On the island are the remains of Benedictine Monastery, which belonged to the former abbey on the island of Susak. Nowadays, there is the cemetery where inhabitants of Ilovik bury their dead.

In the history, Sveti Petar served as a quarantine on the way to Venice, from this era, the ship berths and the remains of the administration building are still visible.

It is also said that Saint Peter walked on this island, thus earning its name of Sveti Petar, which is Saint Peter in Croatian.
