= Ilovik =

Island of Croatia

Native name: Ilovik, Sveti Petar Nickname: San Piero, Šan Pjero
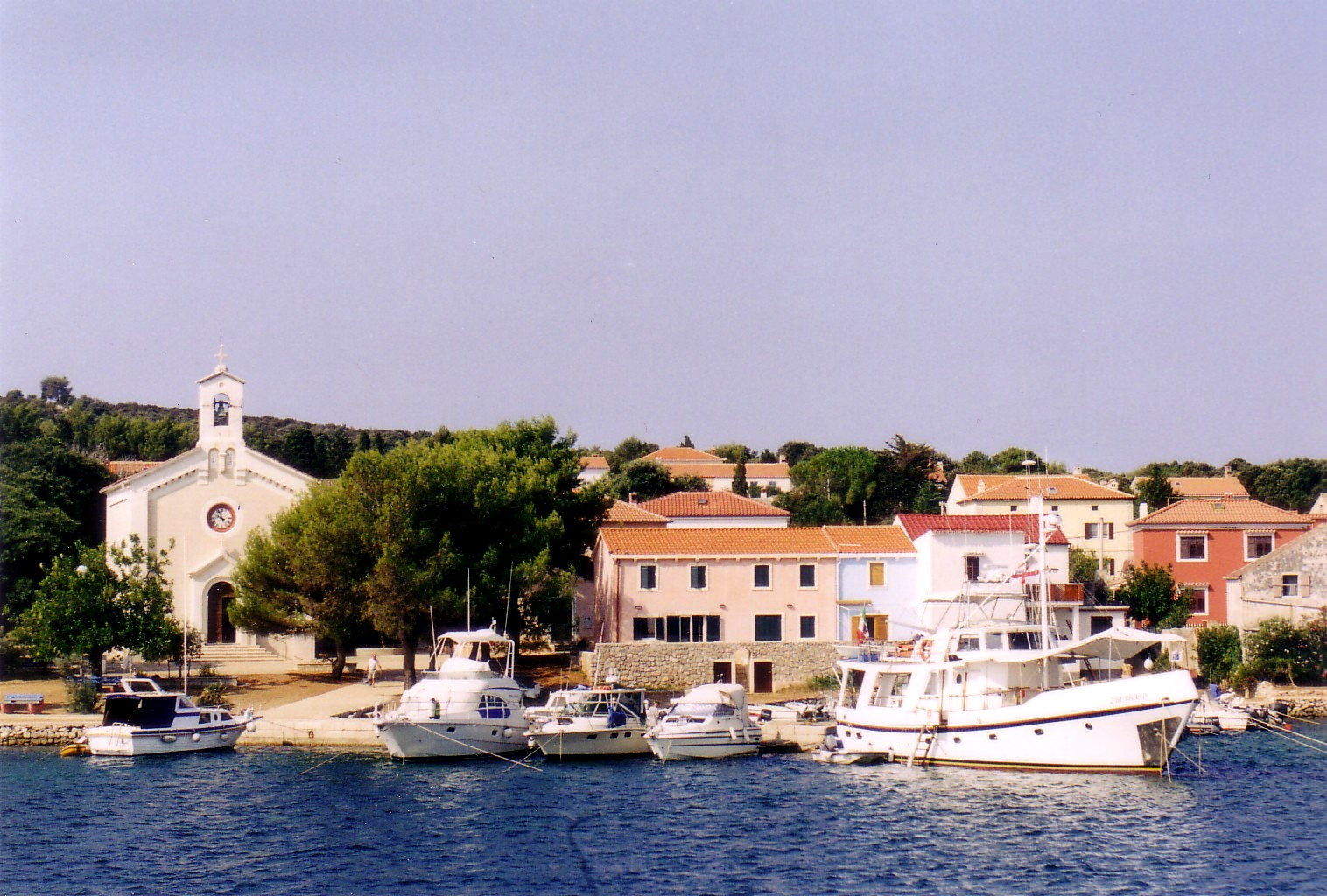
- Port of Ilovik

- Location within Croatia
- Interactive map of Ilovik

Geography
- Location: Adriatic Sea, Kvarner Bay
- Coordinates: 44°27′09.37″N 14°32′54.57″E
- Archipelago: Cres-Lošinj archipelago
- Area: 6.7 km^{2} (2.6 sq mi)
- Coastline: 14.9 km (9.26 mi)
- Highest elevation: 95 m (312 ft)
- Highest point: Dida

Administration
- Croatia
- County: Primorje-Gorski Kotar County
- Capital and largest city: Ilovik (pop. 106)

Demographics
- Population: 106 (2021)
- Pop. density: 18.27/km^{2} (47.32/sq mi)

Additional information
- Vehicle registration: RI (Rijeka); Boats: ML (Mali Lošinj)

The islands of Ilovik (Italian: Asinello) and Sveti Petar (Italian: San Pietro) are located in Croatia south of the island Lošinj, separated by the Strait of Ilovik (Croatian: Ilovačka vrata).

== Geography ==
The only village located on the island of Ilovik is also called Ilovik. The circumference of the island is 15.4 km (9.6 mi), and it occupies an area of 5.8 km^{2} (1,400 acres). The coast is accessible from all sides with many secluded bays. The largest bay with a sandy beach is Paržine, located on the southeastern part of the island. Paržine is connected to the village by a road, as is the beach Parknu, which includes a World War II bunker. Beaches with easier access from the village include Harbac, Šoto Pini, and Sidro. Also at Šoto Pini, which means "under the pines", there is a small soccer field. The island also has a bocce court and playground.

Ilovik and Sveti Petar are separated by an inlet which is 2.5 km (1.6 mi) long and 300 metres (980 feet) wide. The location of the inlet offers a natural barrier from most winds, except partially from the sirocco and bora. The convenient location of this harbor makes it a favorite rest stop between the northern and southern parts of the Adriatic. In only a few hours, you can reach Istria, Rijeka, Krk, Rab, Pag, Kornati and other mid-Dalmatian destinations.

In the town, you will find a convenience/grocery store, post office, a currency exchange office, and a few restaurants.

== Vegetation ==
Ilovik is covered with Mediterranean vegetation, mostly macchia. By the mid-20th century, the island was largely stripped of vegetation due to extensive goat and cattle farming, as well as exploitation of forest for firewood and construction. In the following decades, a gradual abandonment of animal husbandry and the introduction of electricity and LPG cylinders have resulted in natural reforestation, and by the early 21st century approximately 65% of the island was covered with forest and macchia.

Throughout the town, laurel, rosemary, and tamarisk are common, and the island is well-known for its flowering plants, oleander in particular, earning it the nickname of "the island of flowers". Olive trees and grape vines still populate the island and are cultivated by inhabitants for personal use. Pine trees are found throughout the island, the most impressive of which are found on the northeast side.

== History ==
Due to its geographic location, the harbor between Ilovik and Sveti Petar has been used as a safe anchorage since ancient times. This also brought the first inhabitants to these islands.

The oldest traces of civilization are from the Ilirian tribe Liburni. Visitors can also see evidence of the presence of the civilization of Ancient Rome on the island. The remains of Roman buildings, mosaics, coins, a burial sarcophagus as well as an underwater archaeological site have been located in this area.

One notable feature of Ilovik's culture is the burial rites. After church services are held on the main island of Ilovik in the church of Saints Peter and Paul (Croatian: Sveti Petar i Sveti Pavao), the body is taken by boat to the cemetery, which is located across the water on another small island named Sveti Petar. The walls enclosing the present-day cemetery date back to the 11th century and were part of a Benedictine monastery. Sveti Petar also houses a summer monastery for monks of the Franciscan Order and the remnants of a small castle, which was built in 1600 by the Republic of Venice. The castle was erected by Filippo Pasqualigo to defend the area from pirates (uskoks). The first Croats arrived on Ilovik at the end of the 18th century from Veli Losinj. This marked the beginning of the modern-day Ilovik.

The oldest recorded name of this island, Neumae Insulae (translated from Latin: "Island with No Name"), is from AD 1071. In the 13th century, it is mentioned as Sanctus Petrus de Nimbis (translated from Latin: "Saint Peter of the Cloud") and later San Pietro dei Nembi (translated from Italian: "Saint Peter of the Cloud"). The Croatian inhabitants named the smaller island Sveti Petar (Saint Peter), more known as 'Priko' the larger Tovarnjak ("Donkey" in English), and finally Ilovik i Sveti Petar. Locals call it San Piero.

From 1920 to 1947, Ilovik and Sveti Petar were part of the Kingdom of Italy following the Treaty of Rapallo, which assigned the Cres and Lošinj archipelago to Italy. Administratively, it belonged to the Province of Pola, within the District of Lussinpiccolo, as part of the municipality of Lussingrande. The islands remained under Italian rule until the 1947 Paris Peace Treaty, when they were ceded to Yugoslavia, later becoming part of modern Croatia.

== Population ==
Historical population
1857	1921	1931	1948	1953	1961	1971	1981	1991	2001
385	512	473	393	399	346	213	147	145	104

The island population has been on a steady decline since the early 1960s when the heavily religious community was granted passports by the extant Yugoslav government. Almost a quarter of the inhabitants left quickly with many crossing to nearby Italy where they were accepted as political refugees. Just under 100 people continue to live year-round on the island of Ilovik, while three times that amount live in the United States. For remaining inhabitants their main occupations continue to be fishing, sheep herding, agriculture and more recently tourism. Common family names are Baričević, Belanić, Budinić, Mezić, Radelić, Raguzin, and Simičić. Because of the Italian occupation and emigration to the United States, many of these names of certain families have been Italianized and anglicized to Bellani, Belanich; Budinis, Budinich; Mezzich, Mezich; Simicich.

People from Ilovik who live in the United States mainly live in the New York City - Long Island/Astoria area. Many others live in New Jersey and Washington. Each summer the island population will often double or triple in size when these expatriates return home with their families for vacation. People in the New York area have organized a club called the Ilovik Social Club.

== Dialect ==
The official language of the island of Ilovik is Croatian. During Italian rule, the main language was Italian.

The dialect of Ilovik is a unique one. It is based on the Istrian dialect of Istria and is much comparable to it as well. It can be summed up as a combination of Italian and Croatian, considering many of the words are Italian. This dialect will only be understood around the Lošinj archipelago and Istria, and not on mainland Croatia.

== Tourism ==
Over the years, Ilovik has become an increasingly popular tourist destination in the Northern Adriatic. There are daily excursion boats that come from Mali Lošinj during the summer. The main attractions are the church of Sts. Peter and Paul; the various beaches, particularly Harbac; the town well; and the small village.

The port of Ilovik has been taken advantage of by sailors from the past to present because of the natural harbor, defending sailors from all winds, particularly Jugo, or the southern wind. During the summer, the harbor is packed with yachts and sailboats from the town cemetery to the Venetian castle.

== Music ==
Music on the island is an important aspect of life. One of the main modes of entertainment is one or more men playing the accordion. Often in the evening, and at certain places and events, such as in front of the church, or for Petrova (day of Sts. Peter and Paul), accordionists will gather to entertain the populace.

Ilovik also has its own traditional song, called "O Sanpjero":

Oj Sanpjero, misto moje
Misto moje
Misto moje
Oj Sanpjero, misto moje
Misto moje
Misto moje

O ljubavi, zavežena
zavežena
zavežena

O ljubavi, zavežena
zavežena
zavežena

Chorus

Oj joj joj!
Anđeliću moj
Kad će doći ona ura da ćeš biti moj!

== Bibliography ==
- Magaš, Damir; Faričić, Josip; Lončarić, Robert (2005). "Osnovni geografski čimbenici suvremene preobrazbe Ilovika" [Basic Geographical Factors of Modern Transformation of Ilovik Island] (PDF). Geoadria (in Croatian). 10 (1): 21–51. doi:10.15291/geoadria.72.
