= Croatian Littoral =

Geographical region of Croatia

Croatian Littoral Hrvatsko primorje
- Geographical region of Croatia^{a}
- Croatian Littoral on a map of Croatia; Croatian Littoral; Sometimes considered part of the Croatian Littoral
- Country: Croatia
- Largest city: Rijeka

Area^{b}
  - Total: 2,997 km^{2} (1,157 sq mi)

Population (2021)^{b}
  - Total: 227,951
  - Density: 76.06/km^{2} (197.0/sq mi)
- ^{a} Croatian Littoral is not designated as an official region; it is a geographical region only.^{b} The figure is an approximation based on the territorial span and population of the municipalities bounded by geographical regions of Istria, Mountainous Croatia, and Dalmatia, including the Kvarner Gulf islands.

Croatian Littoral (Croatian: Hrvatsko primorje) is a historical name for the region of Croatia comprising mostly the coastal areas between traditional Dalmatia to the south, Mountainous Croatia to the north, Istria and the Kvarner Gulf of the Adriatic Sea to the west. The term "Croatian Littoral" developed in the 18th and 19th centuries, reflecting the complex development of Croatia in historical and geographical terms.

The region saw frequent changes to its ruling powers since classical antiquity, including the Roman Empire, the Ostrogoths, the Lombards, the Byzantine Empire, the Frankish Empire, and the Croats, some of whose major historical heritage originates from the area—most notably the Baška tablet. The region and adjacent territories became a point of contention between major European powers, including the Republic of Venice, the Kingdom of Hungary, and the Habsburg and Ottoman Empires, as well as Austria, the First French Empire, the Kingdom of Italy, and Yugoslavia.

== Geography ==
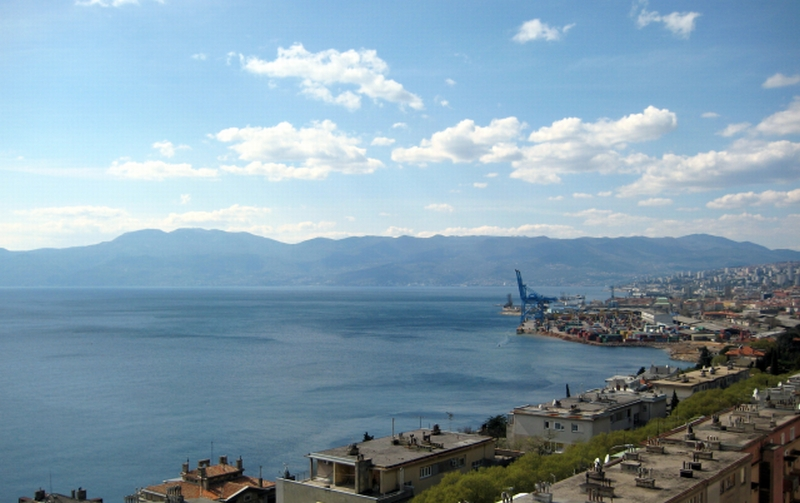
Kvarner Gulf shore near Rijeka

Croatian Littoral is a geographical region of Croatia comprising the area between Dalmatia to the south, Mountainous Croatia to the north and east, and Istria and the Kvarner Gulf of the Adriatic Sea to the west. The region encompasses a large part of Primorje-Gorski Kotar County and the coastal part of Lika-Senj County. The island of Pag is sometimes included in the region, although it is normally considered to be part of Dalmatia. The islands of Cres, Lošinj, Krk, and Rab, as well as further comparatively small nearby islands, are also considered part of the region, contributing to an alternate name for the region—Kvarner Littoral or Kvarner. Various definitions exist as to the extent of "Croatian Littoral" and "Kvarner Littoral" as geographical terms. Specifically, Kvarner Littoral is variously considered to extend east to Senj, or even further east. On the other hand, Kvarner is normally considered to include Istria east of Učka mountain, making Kvarner synonymous with the coastal areas and islands of Primorje-Gorski Kotar County.

Croatian Littoral covers 2,830 square kilometres (1,090 square miles), has a population of 228,725, and the region as a whole has a population density of 80.82/km^{2} (209.3/sq mi). The islands, encompassing 1,120 square kilometres (430 square miles), are home to 39,450 residents. More than half the region's population lives in the city of Rijeka—by far the largest urban centre in the area. All other settlements in the region are relatively small, with only four of them exceeding a population of 4,000: Crikvenica, Mali Lošinj (the largest island settlement), Senj, and Kostrena.

Cities and municipalities of the Croatian Littoral
County	City or municipality	Area (km^{2})	Population
Lika-Senj	Karlobag	287	787
Lika-Senj	Senj	663	5,978
Primorje-Gorski Kotar	Bakar	63	7,581
Primorje-Gorski Kotar	Baška	101	1,673
Primorje-Gorski Kotar	Cres	292	2,738
Primorje-Gorski Kotar	Crikvenica	58	10,004
Primorje-Gorski Kotar	Čavle	85	7,081
Primorje-Gorski Kotar	Dobrinj	55	2,153
Primorje-Gorski Kotar	Jelenje	109	5,077
Primorje-Gorski Kotar	Kastav	11	10,265
Primorje-Gorski Kotar	Klana	94	1,856
Primorje-Gorski Kotar	Kraljevica	18	4,073
Primorje-Gorski Kotar	Krk	111	6,846
Primorje-Gorski Kotar	Kostrena	12	4,438
Primorje-Gorski Kotar	Lopar	26	1,097
Primorje-Gorski Kotar	Mali Lošinj	223	7,565
Primorje-Gorski Kotar	Malinska-Dubašnica	39	3,235
Primorje-Gorski Kotar	Novi Vinodolski	262	4,345
Primorje-Gorski Kotar	Omišalj	39	3,020
Primorje-Gorski Kotar	Punat	82	1,908
Primorje-Gorski Kotar	Rab	102	7,168
Primorje-Gorski Kotar	Rijeka	44	108,622
Primorje-Gorski Kotar	Vinodol	152	3,242
Primorje-Gorski Kotar	Viškovo	19	16,015
Primorje-Gorski Kotar	Vrbnik	50	1,184
TOTAL:		2,997	227,951
Sources: Croatian Bureau of Statistics, United Nations Development Programme, Primorje-Gorski Kotar County

The most populous urban areas in Croatian Littoral
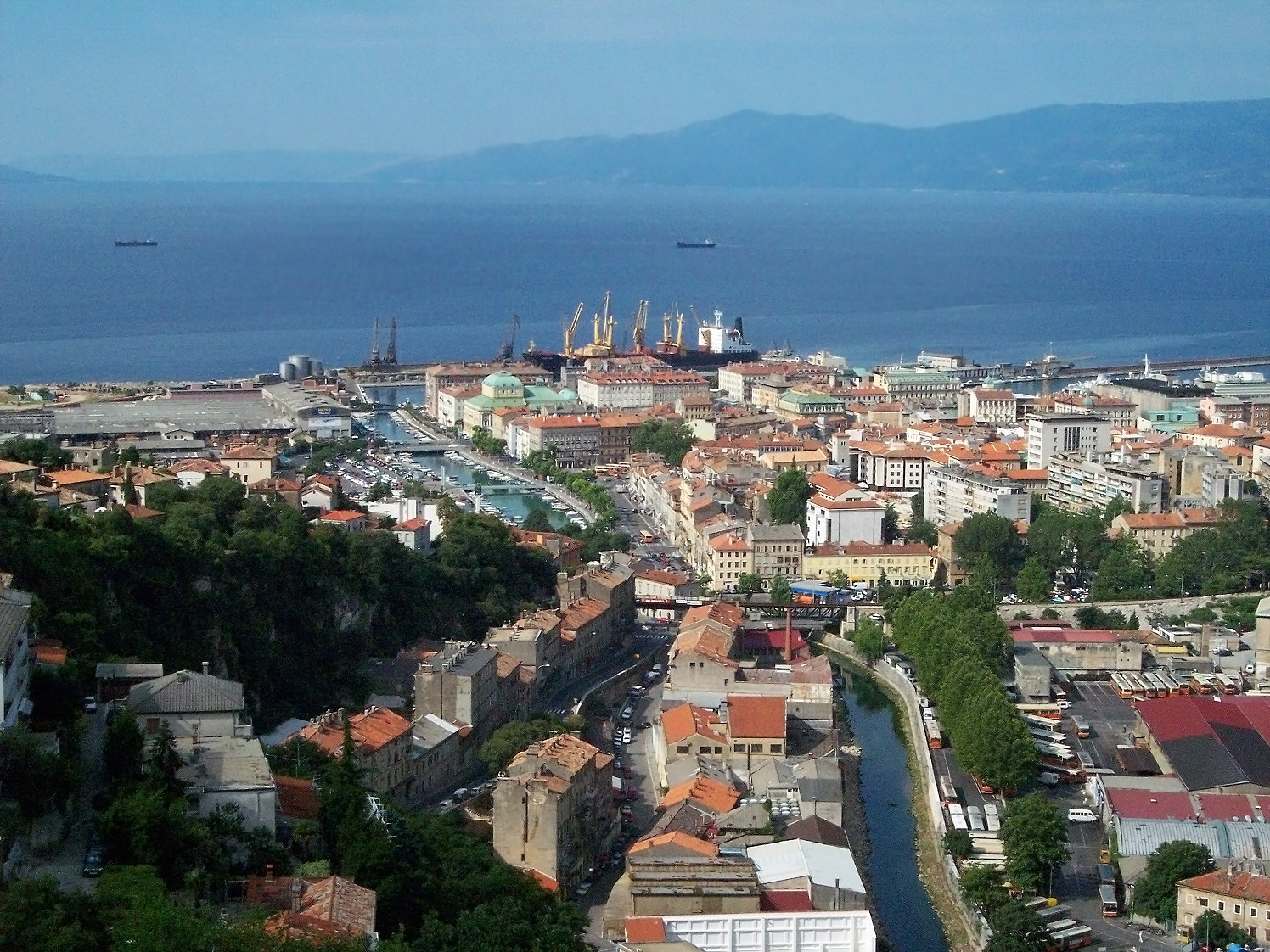
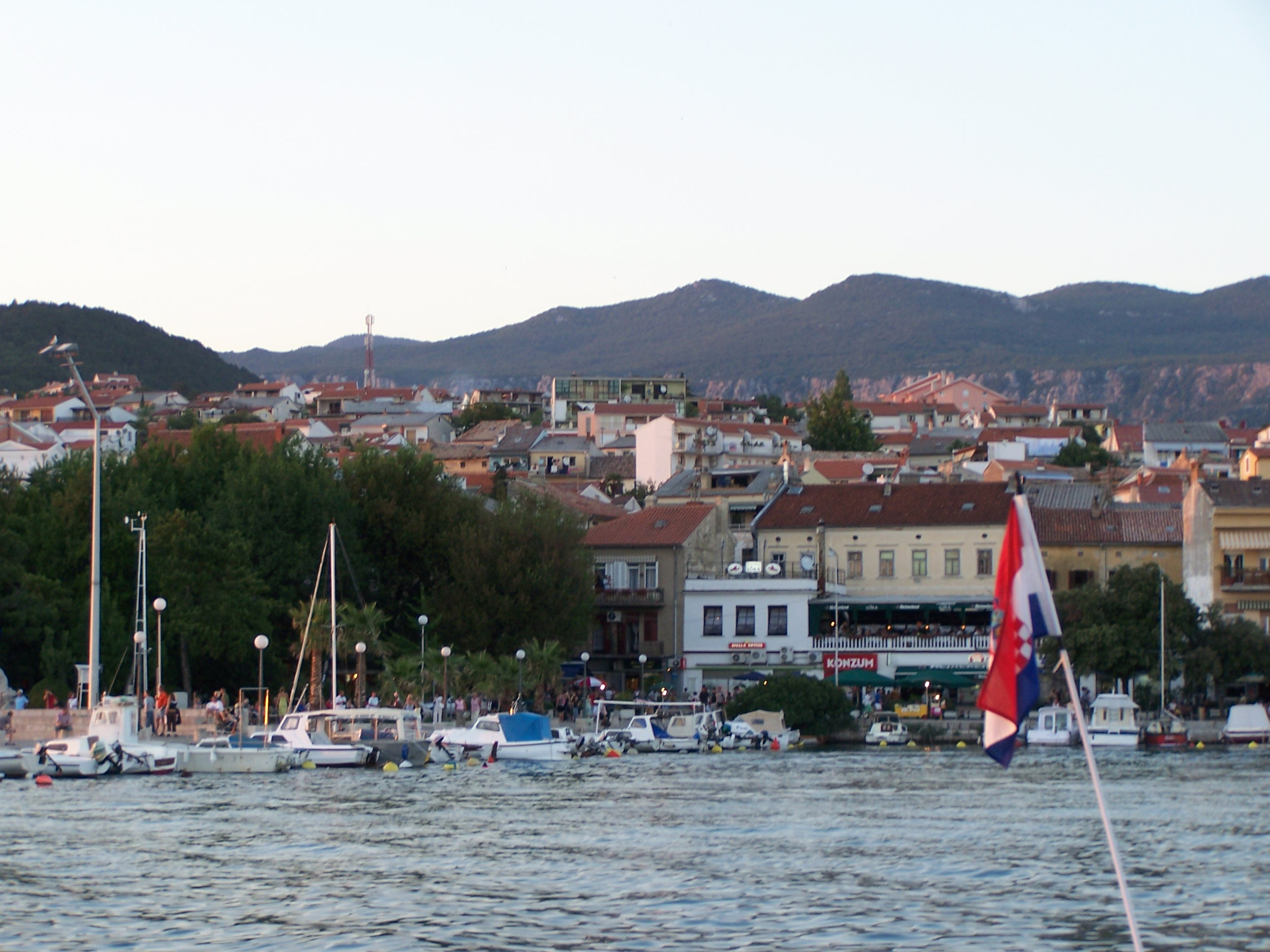
Rijeka	Rank	City	County	Urban population	Municipal population	Crikvenica
1	Rijeka	Primorje-Gorski Kotar	108,622	108,622
2	Crikvenica	Primorje-Gorski Kotar	6,218	10,004
3	Mali Lošinj	Primorje-Gorski Kotar	5,577	7,565
5	Kostrena	Primorje-Gorski Kotar	4,438	4,438
4	Senj	Lika-Senj	4,145	5,978
- Sources: Croatian Bureau of Statistics, 2011 Census

=== Topography and geology ===
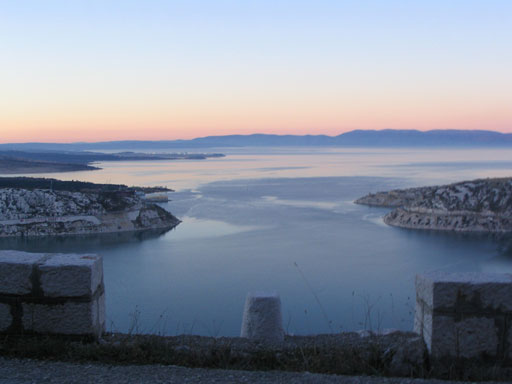
Bay of Bakar

The foothills of mountains that form the northeast boundary of the region, as well as islands in the Kvarner Gulf, are part of the Dinaric Alps, linked to a fold and thrust belt continuously developing from the Late Jurassic to recent times. The thrust belt is a part of the Alpine orogeny and extends southeast from the southern Alps. Geomorphologically the region was formed as the Adriatic Plate is subducted under structural units comprising the Dinaric Alps. The process formed several seismic faults, with most significant among them being the Ilirska Bistrica – Rijeka – Senj fault, which was the source of several significant earthquakes in past centuries. The Dinaric Alps in Croatia encompass the regions of Gorski Kotar and Lika in the immediate hinterland of the Croatian Littoral, as well as considerable parts of Dalmatia. Their northeastern edge runs from 1,181-metre (3,875 ft) Žumberak to the Banovina region, along the Sava River, and their westernmost landforms are the 1,272-metre (4,173 ft) Ćićarija and the 1,396-metre (4,580 ft) Učka mountains in Istria to the west of the Croatian Littoral region.

Karst topography makes up about half of Croatia and is especially prominent in the Dinaric Alps and the Croatian Littoral. Though most of the soil in the region developed from carbonate rock, flysch is significantly represented on the Kvarner Gulf coast opposite Krk. The karst topography developed from the Adriatic Carbonate Platform, where karstification largely began after the final raising of the Dinarides in the Oligocene and Miocene epochs, when carbonate rock was exposed to atmospheric effects such as rain; this extended to 120 metres (390 ft) below the present sea level, exposed during the Last Glacial Maximum's sea level drop. It is surmised that some karst formations are related to earlier drops of sea level, most notably the Messinian salinity crisis.

Cres – Lošinj and Krk – Rab island chains divide the Kvarner Gulf into four distinct areas: Rijeka Bay, Kvarner (sensu stricto), Kvarnerić, and Vinodol Channel. The Cres – Lošinj group also includes the inhabited islands of Ilovik, Susak, Unije, Vele Srakane, and Male Srakane, as well as a larger number of small, uninhabited islands. The Zadar Archipelago extends to the southeast of the island group. The Krk – Rab island group includes only uninhabited islands in addition to Krk and Rab, the largest among them Plavnik, Sveti Grgur, Prvić, and Goli Otok. The Krk – Rab island group is usually thought to represent a single archipelago with the island of Pag (southeast of Rab) and islets surrounding Pag.

Data on the populated islands of Croatian Littoral as of 31 March 2001
Island	Population	Area	Highest point	Population density	Coordinates
Krk	17,860	405.78 km^{2} (100,270 acres)	568 m (1,864 ft)	44.0/km^{2} (0.178/acre)	45°4′N 14°36′E
Rab	9,480	90.84 km^{2} (22,450 acres)	410 m (1,350 ft)	104.4/km^{2} (0.422/acre)	44°46′N 14°46′E
Lošinj	7,771	74.68 km^{2} (18,450 acres)	589 m (1,932 ft)	104.1/km^{2} (0.421/acre)	44°35′N 14°24′E
Cres	3,184	405.78 km^{2} (100,270 acres)	639 m (2,096 ft)	7.8/km^{2} (0.032/acre)	44°57′N 14°24′E
Susak	188	3.8 km^{2} (940 acres)	98 m (322 ft)	49.5/km^{2} (0.200/acre)	44°31′N 14°18′E
Ilovik	104	5.2 km^{2} (1,300 acres)	92 m (302 ft)	20.0/km^{2} (0.081/acre)	44°28′N 14°33′E
Unije	90	16.92 km^{2} (4,180 acres)	132 m (433 ft)	5.3/km^{2} (0.021/acre)	44°38′N 14°15′E
Vele Srakane	8	1.15 km^{2} (280 acres)	59 m (194 ft)	5.3/km^{2} (0.021/acre)	44°35′N 14°19′E
Male Srakane	2	0.61 km^{2} (150 acres)	40 m (130 ft)	3.3/km^{2} (0.013/acre)	44°34′N 14°20′E
Note: All the islands are located in the Primorje-Gorski Kotar County.

=== Hydrology and climate ===
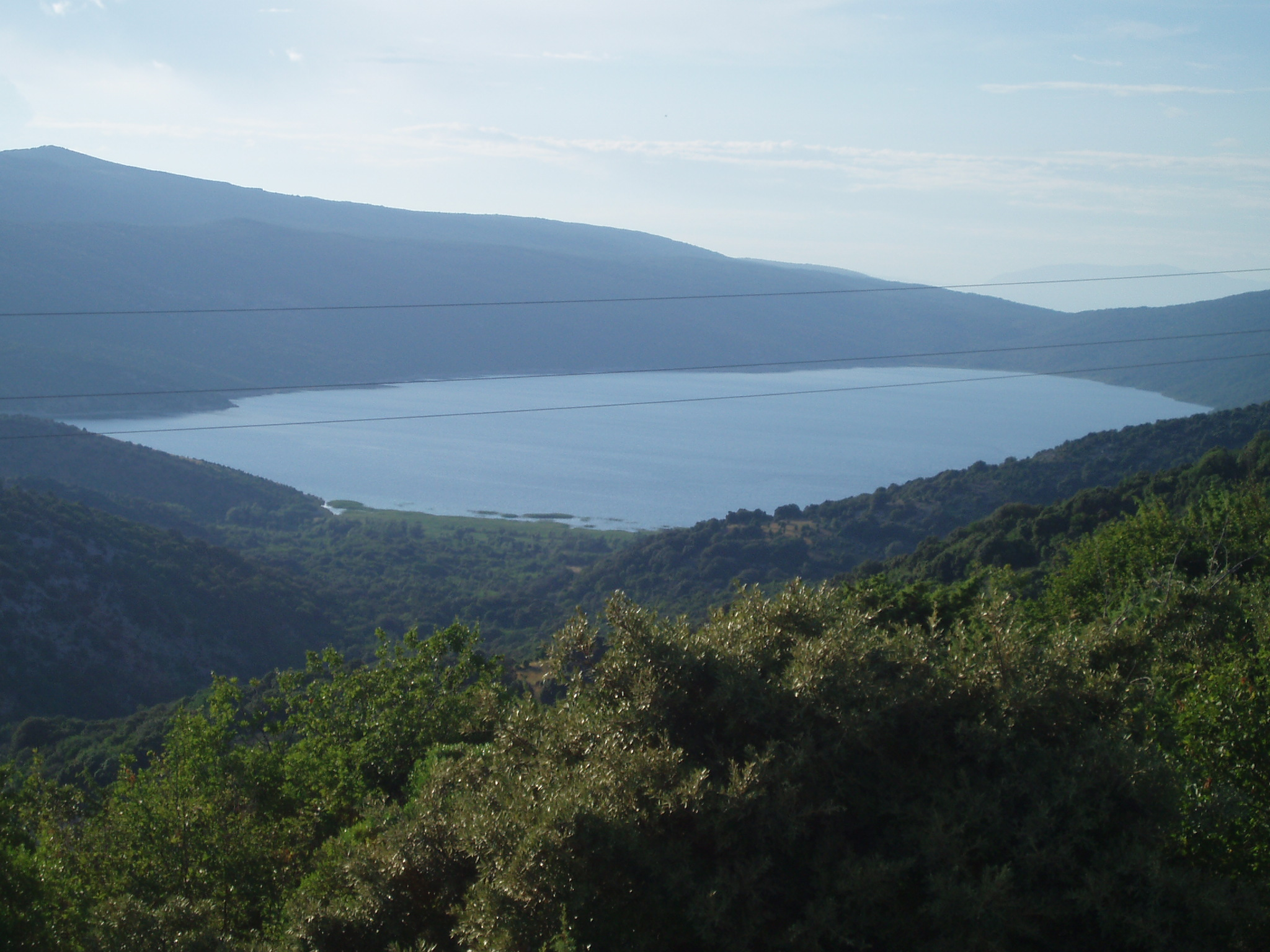
Lake Vrana on the island of Cres

The availability of water varies significantly throughout the region. The area between Rijeka and Vinodol contains numerous freshwater springs that are largely tapped for water supply systems. Water significantly contributed to the geomorphology of the area, especially in the Bay of Bakar, a ria located between Rijeka and Kraljevica. At the seaward slopes of Velebit, in areas near Senj and Karlobag, surface watercourses are sparse. They form losing streams flowing to the sea, while springs of lower yield dry up during summer. The most significant watercourse in the region is the 17.5-kilometre (10.9-mile) long Rječina River, flowing into the Adriatic Sea in the city of Rijeka. The islands of Cres, Krk, and Lošinj have significant surface water that is used as the primary water supply source on those islands. The most significant among them is Lake Vrana on the island of Cres, containing 220,000,000 cubic metres (7.8×10^{9} cubic feet) of water. The surface of the freshwater lake is at 16 metres (52 feet) above sea level, while its maximum depth is 74 metres (243 feet). The Gulf of Kvarner is an especially significant area for the preservation of biodiversity.

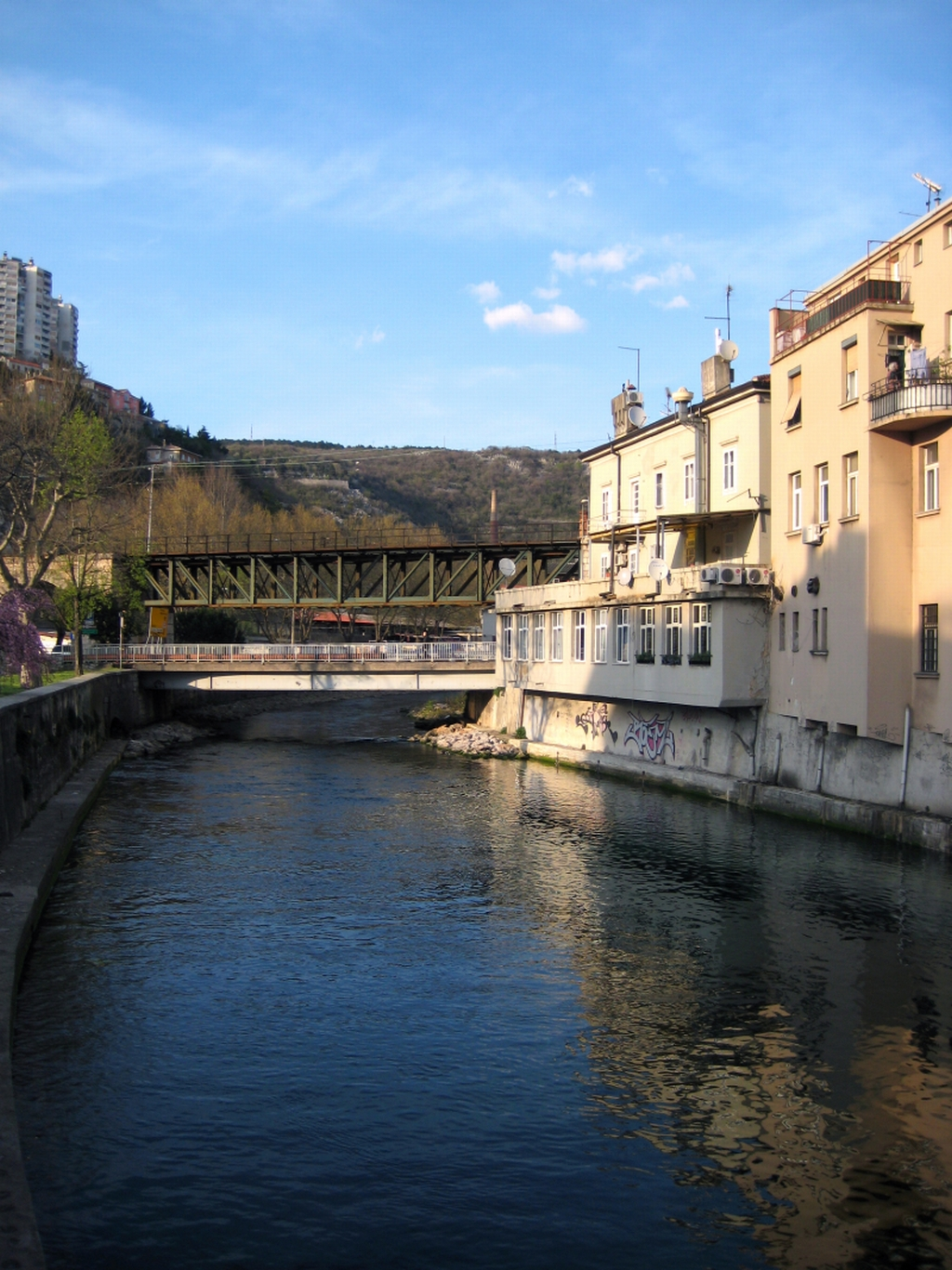
Rječina River in Rijeka

The Kvarner Gulf islands and the immediate mainland coastal areas enjoy a moderately warm and rainy hot-summer Mediterranean climate (Cfa), although the southern part of the Lošinj Island enjoys hot-summer Mediterranean climate (Csa) as defined by the Köppen climate classification. Areas of the Croatian Littoral further away from the coast enjoy a moderately warm and rainy oceanic climate (Cfb), similar to the continental climate of most inland regions of Croatia. The mean monthly temperature varies throughout the region. On the mainland coast it ranges between 5.2 °C (41.4 °F) (in January) and 23 °C (73 °F) (in July). On the Kvarner Gulf islands the mean monthly temperature is somewhat higher; it ranges from 7.3 °C (45.1 °F) (in January) to 23.8 °C (74.8 °F) (in July), while at higher elevations, in the mountains found along the northern and eastern peripheral areas of the region, temperatures range between −1.2 °C (29.8 °F) (in January) and 16.8 °C (62.2 °F) (in July). The lowest air temperature recorded in the region, −16.6 °C (2.1 °F), was measured in Senj, on 10 February 1956. The islands of Lošinj, Cres, Krk, and Rab receive the most sunshine during the year—with 217 clear days per year on average. Seawater temperatures reach up to 26 °C (79 °F) in summer, while dipping to 16 °C (61 °F) in spring and autumn and as low as 10 °C (50 °F) in winter. The predominant winter winds are the bora and jugo. The bora is significantly conditioned by wind gaps in the Dinaric Alps bringing cold and dry continental air—the point where it reaches its peak speed is at Senj, with gusts of up to 180 kilometres per hour (97 kn; 110 mph). The jugo brings humid and warm air, often carrying Saharan sand that causes rain dust.

Climate characteristics in major cities in Croatian Littoral
City	Mean temperature (daily high)				Mean total rainfall					
City	January		July		January			July		
City	°C	°F	°C	°F	mm	in	days	mm	in	days
Rijeka	8.7	47.7	27.7	81.9	134.9	5.31	11.0	82.0	3.23	9.1
Source:World Meteorological Organization

=== Secondary definition ===
In modern times, the term Croatian Littoral is also applied to entire Adriatic coast of the Republic of Croatia in general terms, which is then divided into the Southern Croatian Littoral (Južno hrvatsko primorje) comprising Dalmatia, and the Northern Croatian Littoral (Sjeverno hrvatsko primorje) comprising Istria and Croatian Littoral in the strict meaning of the term.

== History ==
=== Middle Ages ===
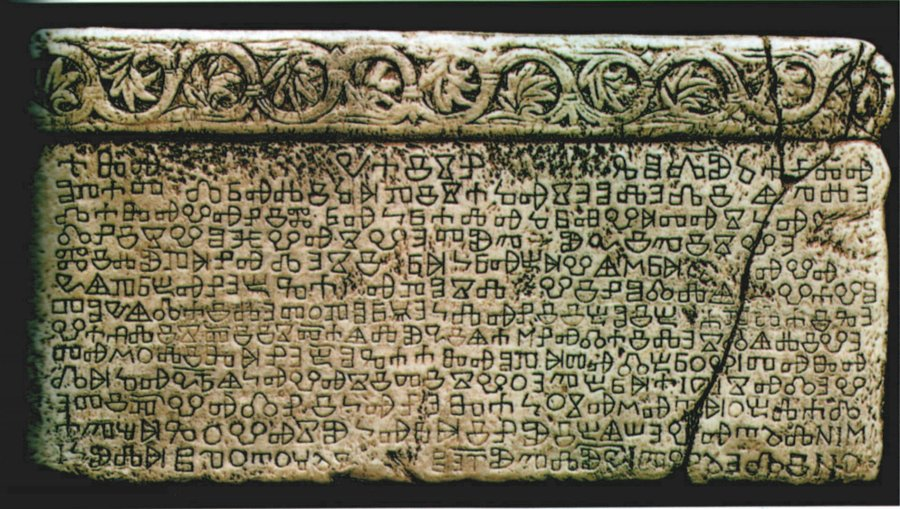
Baška tablet found on Krk island

In the Early Middle Ages, after the decline of the Roman Empire, the Adriatic coasts of the region were ruled by Ostrogoths, Lombards, and the Byzantine Empire. The Carolingian Empire arose in the last part of the period and subsequently the Frankish Kingdom of Italy took control of the Adriatic Sea's western coast extending to the Kvarner Gulf, while Byzantine control of the opposite coast gradually shrunk following the Avar and Croatian invasions starting in the 7th century. The region was gradually incorporated into the medieval Kingdom of Croatia by the 11th century, when the kingdom reached its territorial peak, and the city of Senj became the most important centre of the region. Items of significance to Croatian historical heritage originated from the region in that period. The most notable among them is the Baška tablet, one of the oldest surviving inscriptions in Croatian.

The region continued to be contested throughout the High Middle Ages as the Republic of Venice started to expand its influence and territory, gradually pushing back Croatia, which had been in a personal union of Croatia and Hungary since 1102. By 1420, Venice controlled Istria and Dalmatia, as well as all the Kvarner Gulf islands except Krk. The island became a part of the realm in 1481, but Venice never captured the region's mainland, which would have entirely linked Venetian possessions in the eastern Adriatic.

=== Habsburg era ===
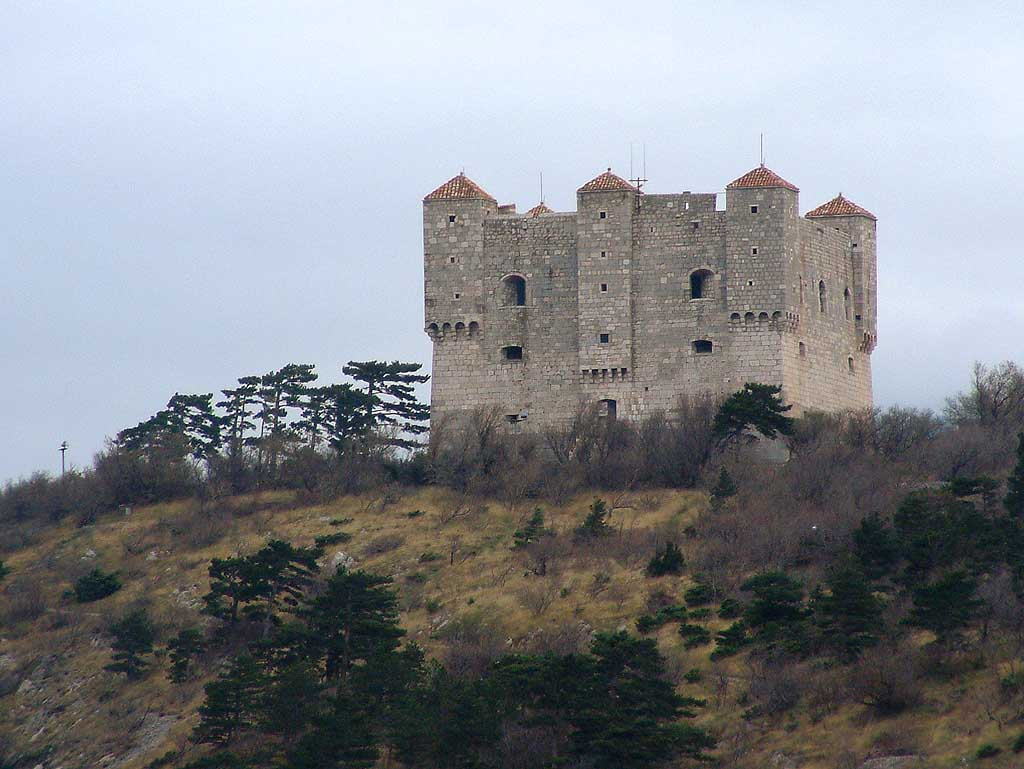
Nehaj Fortress near Senj

Ottoman conquests led to the Battle of Krbava field (1493) and the Battle of Mohács (1526), both decisive Ottoman victories, the latter of which caused a succession crisis in the Kingdom of Hungary. In the 1527 election in Cetin, Ferdinand I of Habsburg was chosen as the new ruler of Croatia, under the condition that he provide protection to Croatia against the Ottoman Empire, which had extended as far as Lika in the immediate hinterland of the region since 1522. As the region became a point of contention between the Habsburgs, Ottomans, and Venetians, its defense was given high importance in the newly established Croatian Military Frontier, as exemplified by the Uskoks of Senj. After the Ottoman conquest of their original base in Klis, the Uskoks established a new headquarters in Nehaj Fortress as a bulwark against westward expansion by the Ottomans. They also launched raids against Christian communities under Ottoman rule and Venetian commerce and subjects. Increasing conflict between the Uskoks and Venice culminated in 1615 – 1617 Uskok War, which resulted in the resettling of the Uskoks, whose final years in Senj were marked by piracy and looting. Between 1684 and 1689, the Ottomans were forced to retreat from Lika and the entire hinterland of the region.

In 1797 the Republic of Venice was abolished after the French conquest. The Venetian territory was then handed over to the Archduchy of Austria. The territory was returned to France after the Peace of Pressburg in 1805. However, the former Venetian possessions on the eastern Adriatic shore, including the present-day Croatian Littoral, were joined into a set of separate provinces of the French Empire: the Illyrian Provinces, created in 1809 through the Treaty of Schönbrunn. Days before the Battle of Waterloo, the Congress of Vienna awarded the Illyrian Provinces (spanning from the Gulf of Trieste to the Bay of Kotor) to the Austrian Empire.

In 1816 the Kingdom of Illyria—an Austrian crown land—was carved out of the former French possession. The territory originally included Carinthia, Carniola, Gorizia and Gradisca, Trieste, Istria, Rijeka, and Civil Croatia south of the Sava River, corresponding to present-day Croatian Littoral and Mountainous Croatia, except the island of Rab. The island and the rest of the former Illyrian Provinces were made a separate crown land, named Kingdom of Dalmatia, in 1817. Rijeka and Civil Croatia were restored to the Kingdom of Croatia and thus the Lands of the Crown of Saint Stephen in 1822, reflecting a series of 18th-century royal letters patent assigning Rijeka to Civil Croatia and the Kingdom of Hungary, giving rise to use of the term "Hungarian Littoral" (Hungarian: Magyar partvidék).

Illyria was abolished in 1849 and the crown lands of Carinthia, Carniola, and Austrian Littoral (German: Österreichisches Küstenland) were established in its place, with the latter including the Krk and Cres – Lošinj island groups. Through the Croatian–Hungarian Settlement of 1868 a corpus separatum was formed containing the city of Rijeka, as a territory directly controlled by Hungary. In 1881, the military frontier, containing the Senj and Velebit foothills, was absorbed by the Kingdom of Croatia-Slavonia.

=== 20th century ===
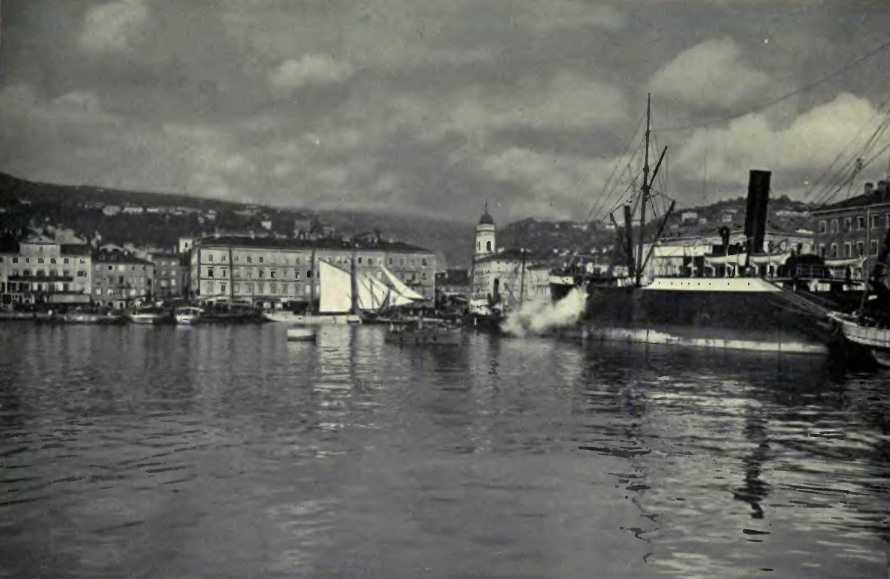
Port of Rijeka in 1923

Following World War I, the dissolution of Austria-Hungary, and the Treaty of Trianon, Hungary lost its possessions in the region. In 1918, a short-lived, unrecognised State of Slovenes, Croats and Serbs was formed out of parts of Austria-Hungary, comprising most of the former monarchy's Adriatic coastline and the entire present-day Croatian Littoral. Later that year, the Kingdom of Serbia and the State of Slovenes, Croats and Serbs formed the Kingdom of Serbs, Croats and Slovenes—subsequently renamed to Yugoslavia. The new union's proponents at the time in the Croatian Parliament saw the move as a defence against Italian expansionism such as via provisions of the 1915 Treaty of London. The treaty was largely disregarded by Britain and France because of conflicting promises made to Serbia and a perceived lack of Italian contribution to the war effort outside Italy itself.

The 1919 Treaty of Saint-Germain-en-Laye did transfer the Austrian Littoral to Italy, but awarded Dalmatia to Yugoslavia. Following the war, a private force of demobilized Italian soldiers seized Rijeka and set up the Italian Regency of Carnaro—seen as a harbinger of Fascism—to force the recognition of Italian claims to the city. After sixteen months of the Regency's existence, the 1920 Treaty of Rapallo redefined the Italian–Yugoslav borders, among other things transferring Zadar and the islands of Cres, Lastovo, and Palagruža to Italy, securing the island of Krk for Yugoslavia, and establishing the Free State of Fiume; this new state was abolished in 1924 by the Treaty of Rome that awarded Rijeka to Italy and Sušak to Yugoslavia.

In April 1941, Yugoslavia was occupied by Nazi Germany and Italy, the latter annexing or occupying the Croatian Littoral, although the armistice between Italy and Allied armed forces of World War II and the 1947 Treaty of Peace with Italy reversed wartime Italian territorial gains, awarding the entire region and adjacent territory to Yugoslavia and the Federal State of Croatia. After the fall of communism, Yugoslavia broke apart as Slovenia and Croatia declared independence in 1991. Although the region suffered an economic decline during the Croatian War of Independence, there was no fighting in the region.

== Culture ==
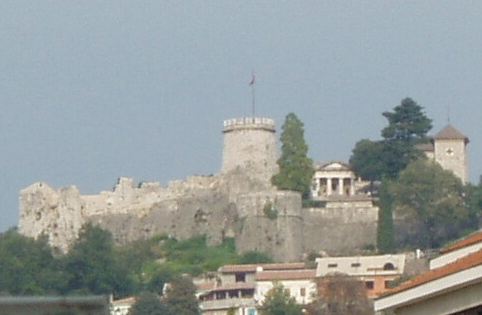
Trsat Castle in Rijeka

Since classical antiquity, the area around Kvarner Bay has been characterized as a meeting point of diverse cultures—from Hellenic and Roman cultures, through the Middle Ages and a succession of various rulers, to the present day. This blending is reflected in the folklore of the area, including Zvončari—bell-ringers best known for annual pageant in Kastav, listed on UNESCO's Representative List of the Intangible Cultural Heritage of Humanity. Crossbowmen from Rab are a living history company reenacting an arbalest tournament first held in 1364 to commemorate the successful defence of the island using that weapon. A typical decorative motif used in the region is morčić (plural: morčići)—a dark skinned Moor used as a centerpiece on jewelry, usually earrings. Legend has it that the motif is related to a hypothesized battle between Croatian and Ottoman armies on Grobnik north of Rijeka, but it is more likely that it is of Venetian origin, as it is similar to the Venetian moretti motif, used mostly on brooches and pins.

The earliest architectural heritage of the region includes ruins of Roman and Byzantine buildings throughout the area and early medieval Croatian burial grounds in the Vinodol area. There are preserved examples of the Romanesque architecture on the island of Krk, in Vinodol, and in the Kastav area—largely churches, monasteries, and fortifications such as Drivenik Castle. Several preserved examples of Gothic churches exist on the mainland, but during the Renaissance, construction largely consisted of fortifications because of the Ottoman conquest of the hinterland of the region. The most powerful noblemen in the region, the House of Zrinski and the House of Frankopan, built numerous castles in the area. They include the castles of Trsat, Grobnik, Bakar, Kraljevica, Ledenice, Bribir, Hreljin, Grižane, Novi Vinodolski, Krk, Drivenik and Gradec near Vrbnik. The most representative piece of Baroque architecture is the St. Vitus Cathedral in Rijeka.

The region was birthplace or home to several writers who made their marks in Croatian, Italian, and Austrian literature. These include Ivan Mažuranić—one of the foremost authors of Croatian literature in the first half of the 19th century—Janko Polić Kamov, Ödön von Horváth, and many others. Chakavian dialect, spoken in the region, is widely present in the works of poets born or living in the region. The most significant artist from the region is Juraj Julije Klović (Italian: Giorgio Giulio Clovio)—a 16th-century miniaturist, illuminator, and artist born in Grižane in Vinodol. 20th-century artists born or active in the region are Romolo Venucci, Jakov Smokvina, Vladimir Udatny, Antun Haller, Ivo Kalina, Vjekoslav Vojo Radoičić, and many others. Churches and monasteries in the region treasure a great number of works of art. These include a 1535 altar polyptych by Girolamo da Santacroce in the Franciscan monastery on the island of Košljun, while a Paolo Veneziano polyptych from Benedictine abbey in Jurandvor near Baška is in the collection of the Roman Catholic Diocese of Krk.

== Economy ==
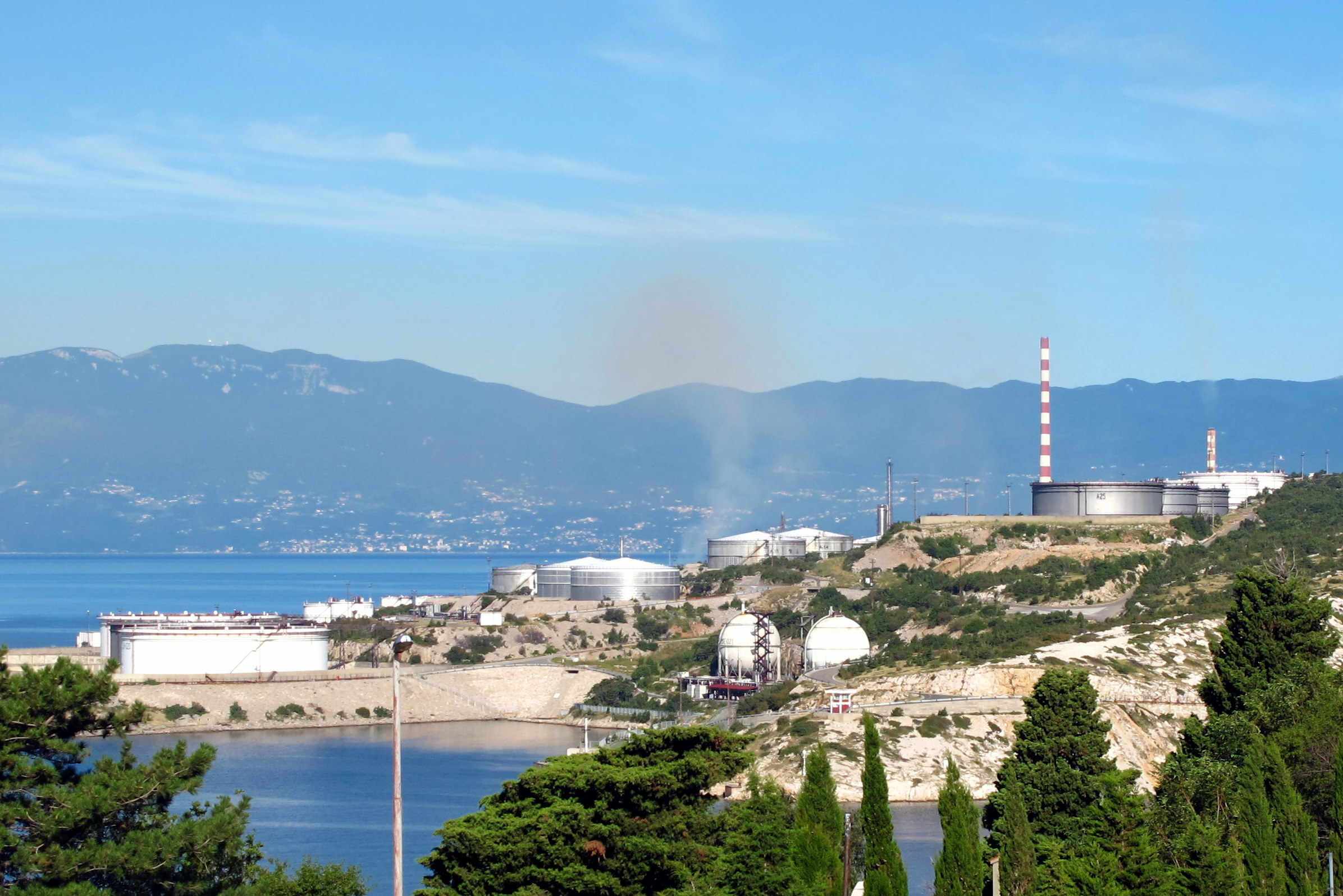
INA oil refinery in Urinj near Rijeka

The economy of the Croatian Littoral is largely centered on the city of Rijeka, whose economic impact is felt directly not only in the geographic region, but also in other parts of Primorje-Gorski Kotar County—Gorski Kotar and Liburnia (modern region)—and a substantial part of Lika-Senj County. The most significant economic activities in the Primorje-Gorski Kotar County are transport, largely based on activities of the Port of Rijeka, shipbuilding and tourism in the coastal areas representing a part of the Northern Croatian Littoral, and forestry and wood processing in the Gorski Kotar region in the hinterland. In the city of Rijeka itself, the most significant economic activities are civil engineering, wholesale and retail trade, transport and storage services, and the processing industry. Tourism, wood processing, and agriculture are the predominant economic activities in Lika-Senj County, where nearly all businesses are small and medium enterprises.

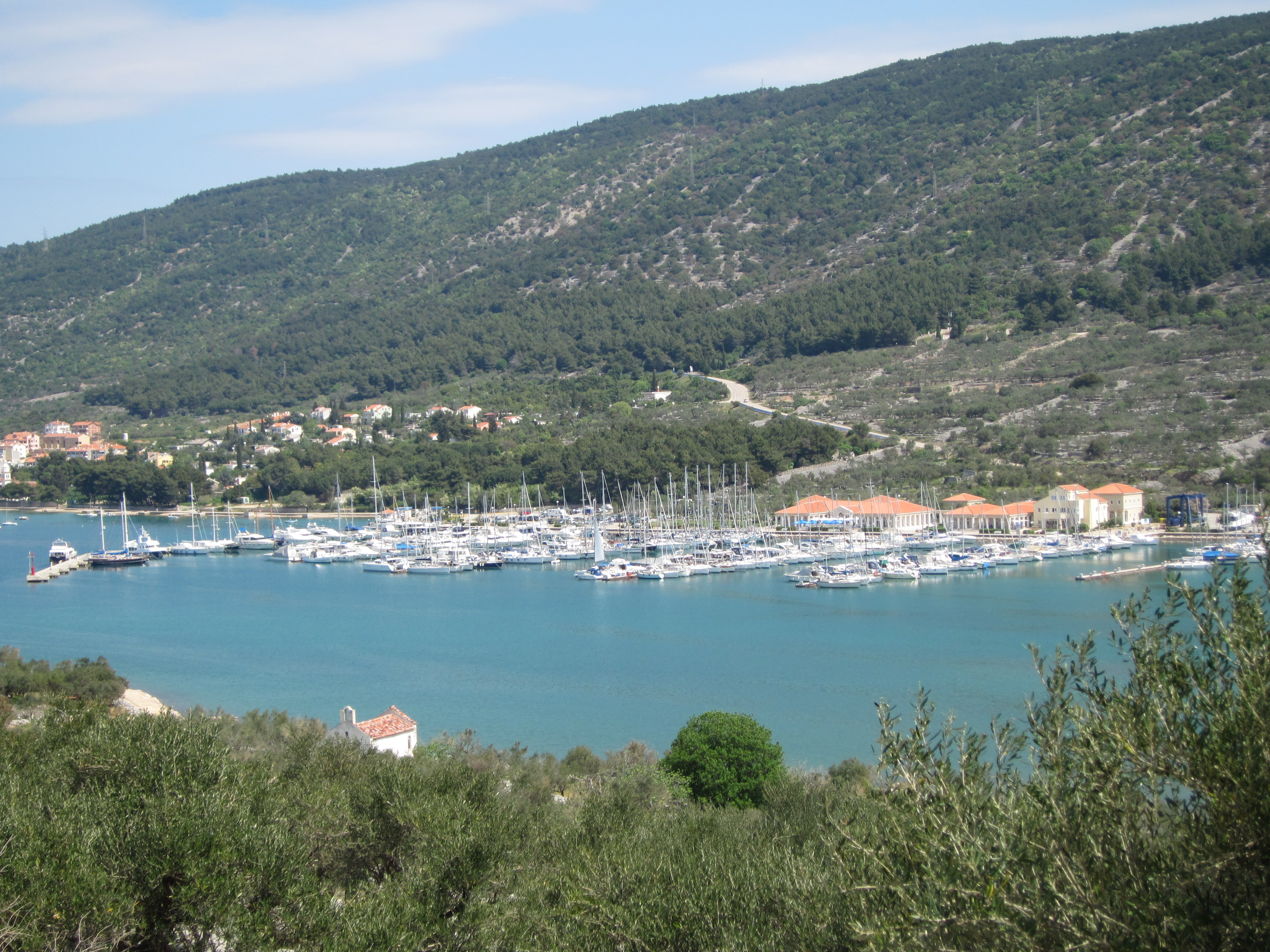
Marinas contribute significantly to the region's tourist industry.

In 2021, two companies headquartered in the Croatian Littoral ranked among the top fifty among Croatian companies by operating income. The highest ranked among them was the Rijeka-based Plodine supermarket chain, which ranked 11th, and Erste & Steiermärkische Bank which ranked 26th.

County	GDP		GDP per capita	
County	million €	Index (Croatia=100)	€	Index (Croatia=100)
Lika-Senj	435	1.0	8,707	86.1
Primorje-Gorski Kotar	3,744	8.4	12,305	121.7
TOTAL:	4,179	9.4	12,038	119.1
Source: Croatian Bureau of Statistics (2008 data)

=== Infrastructure ===
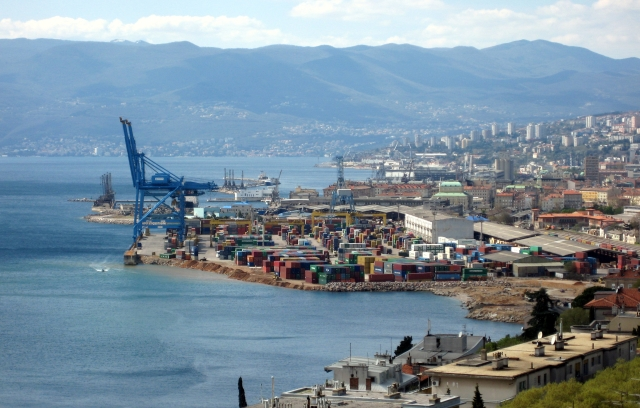
Port of Rijeka container cargo terminal

Pan-European transport corridor branch Vb runs through the Croatian Littoral region. The route encompasses the A6 motorway spanning from the Orehovica interchange—part of the Rijeka bypass where the A6 and the A7 motorways meet—to the Bosiljevo 2 interchange, where the corridor route switches to the A1 motorway before proceeding north to Zagreb and Budapest, Hungary. The corridor also comprises a railway line connecting the Port of Rijeka to Zagreb and further destinations abroad. Another significant road transport route in the region is the A7 motorway, connecting Rijeka to Slovenia. The island of Krk is connected to the mainland via the Krk Bridge—comprising a 390-metre (1,280 ft) reinforced concrete arch, the longest in the world when completed in 1980.

The Port of Rijeka is the largest port in Croatia, handling the greatest portion of the country's imports and exports. Its facilities include terminals and other structures in the city and in the area reaching from the Bay of Bakar, where the bulk cargo terminal is located, approximately 13 kilometres (8.1 miles) east of Rijeka, to Bršica to the west of Rijeka, where there is a multi-purpose terminal. The Port of Rijeka also serves passenger and ferry lines operated by Jadrolinija to the nearby islands of Cres, Mali Lošinj, Susak, Ilovik, Unije, Rab, and Pag, as well as to Adriatic ports further south, such as Split and Dubrovnik. The line to Split and Dubrovnik also serves the islands of Hvar, Korčula, and Mljet. There are two international airports in the region—Rijeka and Lošinj. Both of the airports serve few flights, but the Rijeka Airport is busier of the two.

Pipeline transport infrastructure in the region comprises the Jadranski naftovod (JANAF) pipeline connecting the Omišalj oil terminal—a part of the Port of Rijeka—to Sisak and Virje crude oil storage facilities and terminals and to a terminal in Slavonski Brod further east on the Sava River. JANAF also operates a pipeline between the terminal and the INA's Rijeka Refinery.

== See also ==
- Geography of Croatia
- Liburnia
