= Ambroz Haračić =

Croatian botanist

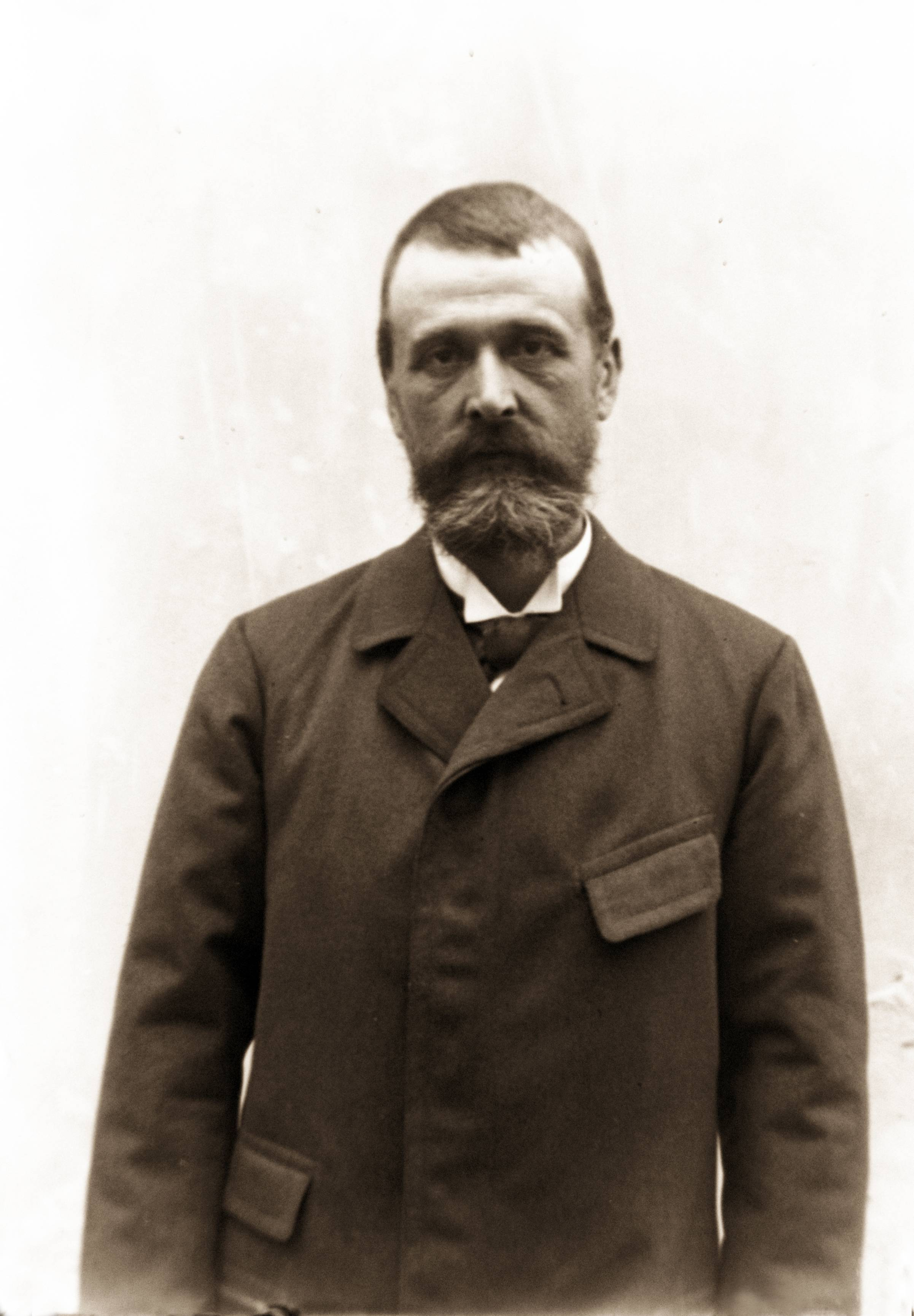
- Haračić in 1894
- Born: 5 December 1855; Mali Lošinj
- Died: 1 October 1916 (aged 60); Mali Lošinj
- Notable work: Otok Lošinj, njegova klima i vegetacija
- Scientific career
- Fields: botany meteorology
- Institutions: Mali Lošinj Maritime School

Ambroz Haračić (born Mali Lošinj, 5 December 1855, died Mali Lošinj, 1 October 1916), was a Croatian botanist.

Haračić studied mathematics and natural sciences in Vienna. In 1879 he started teaching at Mali Lošinj nautical school, and in 1897 he was transferred to Trieste. He spent 18 years in his hometown conducting meteorological measurements and observations, and based on the results of the research, the Austro-Hungarian government declared Mali Lošinj to be a health resort, which resulted in development of tourism on the island.

Haračić studied vegetation of Lošinj and several smaller nearby islands like Ilovik, Susak, Unije, Male Srakane, Vele Srakane, Murtar, Oruda, always connecting the island climate with the flora of the island. He also helped with forestation of the island of Lošinj. His rich collection of herbs is preserved in Botanics department of Faculty of Natural sciences and Mathematics of the University in Zagreb. He published many works based on his research. A complete bibliography of his work can be found in Zbornik radova o prirodoslovcu Ambrozu Haračiću (Proceedings of the natural scientist Ambroz Haračić).

For his efforts, a statue was erected on the south part of the Čikat cove.

== Sources ==
- "Enciklopedija Jugoslavije" (Encyclopedia of Jugoslavia) (4 E-Hrv), Zagreb, 1986.
