= Srakane =

Srakane is the name of two islands on the Croatian coast:

- Male Srakane
- Vele Srakane
