= List of historical maps =

The following is a list of notable extant historical maps.

== Early world maps ==
- Babylonian Map of the World (flat-earth diagram on a clay tablet, c. 600 BC)
- Tabula Rogeriana (1154)
- Psalter world map (1260)
- Tabula Peutingeriana (1265, medieval map of the Roman Empire, believed to be based on 4th century source material)
- Hereford Mappa Mundi (c. 1285; the largest medieval map known still to exist)
- Map of Maximus Planudes (c. 1300), earliest extant realization of Ptolemy's world map (2nd century)
- Gangnido (Korea, 1402)
- Bianco world map (1436)
- Fra Mauro map (c. 1450)
- Map of Bartolomeo Pareto (1455)
- Genoese map (1457)
- Map of Juan de la Cosa (1500)
- Cantino planisphere (1502)
- Piri Reis map (1513)
- Dieppe maps (c. 1540s-1560s)
- Mercator 1569 world map
- Theatrum Orbis Terrarum (Ortelius, Netherlands, 1570–1612)
- Kunyu Wanguo Quantu (1602)

== Notable atlases ==
- Atlas Maior (Blaeu, Netherlands, 1635–1658)
- Klencke Atlas (1660)
- Atlas Maior (Blaeu, Netherlands, 1662–1667)
- Cary's New and Correct English Atlas (London, 1787)
- Andrees Allgemeiner Handatlas (Germany, 1881–1939; in the UK as Times Atlas of the World, 1895)
- Times Atlas of the World (United Kingdom, 1895)
- Rand McNally Atlas (United States, 1881–present)
- Stielers Handatlas (Germany, 1817–1944)
- Atlante Internazionale del Touring Club Italiano (Italy, 1927)
- Atlas Mira (Soviet Union/Russia, 1937)

== Early regional maps ==
- Ancient Egypt
  - Turin Papyrus Map (c. 1150 BC)
- Cartography of Europe
  - Carta Pisana (13th century)
  - Corbitis Atlas (late 14th century collection of portolan charts)
- Early Chinese cartography
  - Da Ming Hunyi Tu (late 14th century Ming dynasty Chinese map)
- Maps of Russia
  - Godunov map (1667)
- Maps of Scandinavia
  - Carta marina (c. 1530)
  - Det Kongelige danske Søkortarkiv (1784)
- French cartography:
  - Cassini maps (1756–1789)
- Cartography of India
  - Survey of India (1767)
  - Great Trigonometrical Survey (1802–1858)
- Maps of Korea
  - Haedong Samgukdo
- Cartography of Switzerland
  - Dufour Map (1863)
  - Siegfried Map (1895–1926)
- Cartography of the United States
  - Americae Sive Quartae Orbis Partis Nova Et Exactissima Descriptio (1562)
  - New and Correct Map of the United States of North America Abel Buell (1784)
  - Samuel Augustus Mitchell (1867)
  - United States Geological Survey, National Program for Topographic Mapping (1884)
  - War of the Rebellion Atlas (1895)
- Maps of the United Kingdom
  - The Brittania (John Ogilby, 1670–1676)
  - Principal Triangulation of Great Britain (1784–1853)

== See also ==
- History of cartography
