= Adriatic Littoral =

Adriatic Littoral may refer to:

- Austrian Littoral, under the Habsburg Empire
- Operational Zone Adriatic Coast, under Nazi occupation
- Croatian Littoral, in Yugoslavia and at present
