= Haračić =

Haračić is a surname. Notable people with the surname include:

- Ambroz Haračić (1855–1916), Croatian botanist
- DiDi Haračić (born 1992), American soccer player
- Dženan Haračić (born 1994), Bosnia and Herzegovina footballer
- Emina Haračič (born 1995), Slovenian rhythmic gymnast
- Izet Haračić (1965–2015), Bosnian bobsledder
