= Romolo Venucci =

Italian painter

Romolo Venucci (Wnoucsek) (1903–1976) was an Italian-Croatian painter and sculptor. He is considered Rijeka's greatest visual artist of the 20th century. His painting work can be systematically traced through the periods of post-impressionism, expressionism, cubism, architectural impressionism, geometric abstraction and figurative painting.

== Biography ==
Romolo was of Czech, Hungarian and Slovenian origin. His father, Antal Wnoucsek, had moved from Pécs to Rijeka, where he married Anna Maria Rostan, a woman from a French-Slovenian family. Their six children spontaneously assimilated into the local Italian (Fiuman) culture (the multiethnic city of Rijeka/Fiume was part of the Kingdom of Hungary at the time and was mainly inhabited by Italians and Croats). Romolo went on to graduate from the Hungarian Royal Drawing School in Budapest.

By the time he returned to his hometown, the latter had been incorporated into the Kingdom of Italy. In 1935 he decided to change his Czech surname into a more Italian-sounding form. He performed several public works such as the wall paintings and decorations in the atrium of the Upper Capuchin Church (1929), and the two angels in high relief for the main facade of the church at Kozala (1933). Among his best works from that time are his charcoal drawings on the subject of the human figure and cuboconstructivist paintings, which the public accepted with difficulty ("I came to spoil the taste of my fellow citizens," the artist declared at the time).

After the Second World War, Rijeka was incorporated into Croatia, within Yugoslavia, which led most of its Italian population to leave the city permanently. However, Romolo and his twin brother, engineer and organist Remo stayed on. In 1946, Venucci, together with Jakov Smokvina, Vinko Matković and Vilim Svečnjak, was the founder of the city branch of the Association of Visual Artists of Croatia, today's Croatian Society of Visual Artists of Rijeka.

== Artistic work ==
After his first post-impressionist phase (Cantrida, 1922), his paintings are characterized by expressionist drama (Portrait of a Young Man, 1927). In the period between 1929 and 1935, he achieved in his paintings a synthesis of futurism and cuboconstructivism (Decomposed Nude, 1927; Figure, 1930; Portrait of Francesco Drenig, 1931), which he applied to three sculptures (The Bather, 1932; The Power of Will, 1933; Female Nude). In his works up to 1960, he remained faithful to the expressionist palette and constructivist modelled form. In the period from 1960 to 1970, he painted abstract compositions (Musical Composition, 1963; Abstract Composition, 1968) and the Gromače cycle. From 1970 to 1976 he painted motifs from Rijeka and Sušak, as well as ports and ships in the manner of expressive realism. He was engaged in art pedagogy, illustration, restoration of paintings and graphic design. He started exhibiting his works in 1927; independent exhibitions were held in Rijeka (1944, 1957, 1971, 1993) and Varese (1965). He played three instruments, and in particular was an excellent violinist.

The works created between 1927 and 1935 probably form the most valuable of all the phases in his oeuvre. Venucci's charcoal drawings from 1927 move towards expressiveness of the line, gesturality of strokes, and reduction of details, shapes and colours in paintings or coloured drawings. Striving more and more to simplify the form, he intensified the sharpness of the line, and multiplied the parallel lines, thus emphasizing the darkening, depressions and shadows, the boundaries of volume, shaping a new reality and space with darker and brighter undefined surfaces. The drawing became firmer over time, and the subject became less and less important, although still recognizable: self-portraits, portraits, or female nudes (standing, sitting, or lying down). These human figures with undefined features often turn into the sole purpose of drawing. Linear shaping and volume definition develop in two directions: 1) a crystalline, sharp crumbling and breaking of volume into smaller parts thus approaching the specifically broken drawings of Italian futurists; 2) towards the integration, summarization and rounding of the volume and shape of the human figure and object, rejecting details and reducing all the presented content to condensed embryonic forms.
