= Vjekoslav Vojo Radoičić =

- Born: 10 November 1930; Slavonska Požega, Kingdom of Yugoslavia
- Died: 15 July 2017 (aged 86)
- Education: Maritime Academy of Rijeka
- Known for: Painting, drawing, sculpture printmaking, stage design
- Movement: Cubism, Surrealism
- Awards: Grigor Vitez Award, Vladimir Nazor Lifetime Achievement Award, Order of Croatian Danica for contributions to culture

Vjekoslav Vojo Radoičić, also known as Vojo Radoičić (10 November 1930 – 15 July 2017), was a Croatian painter, sculptor, printmaker, and stage designer. He was born in Požega while Croatia was still under the Kingdom of Yugoslavia. He lived and worked in Vienna, London and Zagreb, and had close and intimate ties with those places as depicted in his artwork, however he spent most of his time in Rijeka, Croatia. Vojo Radoicic has held more than 180 independent exhibitions in Croatia, as well as abroad. He was known for depicting the places he has traveled to in vibrant colors through a child's mindset to tell stories of his experiences. He was awarded the Order of Croatian Danica for contributions to culture.

== Early life ==
Vojo Radoičić was born in Požega in 1930, he later moved to Zagreb as a boy and lived there during the second world war. He attend primary school in Zagreb and has fond memories of his teachers and classmates. He moved to Rijeka to attend the Rijeka Maritime Academy. After graduation Vojo worked on a number of ships and started drawing and painting. He has lived in London and Vienna, and was good friends with the renowned Austrian artist and architect Friedensreich Hundertwasser. Vojo Radoičić has had independent exhibitions in Rijeka, Opatija, Dubrovnik, Zagreb, Venice, Florence, Vienna, London, Melbourne, New York and Oslo. He is also a member of the Croatian Painters Society of Rijeka and Zagreb as well as the Verein Bildenden Kunstler Osterreichs, Wien - Schonbrun.

== Paintings ==
Vojo Radoičić is well known in Croatia and abroad for his unique style of painting and the themes that he tries to depict in his artwork. He has stated that through his artwork he tries to tell a story of an experience or a place that he has visited and that has left an impact on his life. All of his paintings represent real places, people and events and are painted through the eyes of a child. Bright and vivid colors are used and maritime themes dominate most of his artwork. Radoičić has stated his belief that a nicer and lovelier world exists out there, and he wants to show it to the world.

== See also ==
- Vladimir Nazor Award for Life Achievement (visual arts)
- Croatian Artists
- Dalmatia
- Friedensreich Hundertwasser
