= Antemurale myth =

The Antemurale myth or the Bulwark myth is one of the nationalist myths which implies a certain nation's mission of being a bulwark against the other religions, nations or ideologies. The word "Antemurale" is derived from Latin ante (before, in time and space) and murale (wall, attributive).

== Characteristics ==
The Antemurale myth is different than other nationalist myths because it does not insist on the uniqueness of a certain group, but on its inclusion into some larger cultural entity which is allegedly superior to other groups which do not belong to it.

The characteristics of antemurale myths are:

- Difference – It can always be found in areas with certain differences, i.e. different ethnic groups or religions.
- Demarcation – It implies a need for demarcation from something different.
- Defence – It implies that something different is of such nature that one has to defend against it.
- Protection – It implies a need for protection of one's life or way of living from something different.
- Commitment – It embraces a commitment to some larger cultural entity that is supposed to be protected, like religion, confession, culture or civilisation.

Demarcation or boundary building element of Antemurale myth-making magnifies the differences that distinguish one group from the selected neighbour and in the same time de-emphasizes boundaries toward the other. Therefore, the Antemurale myth is opposed to the Sui generis myth because it implies that the group is not that unique because it is part of the larger identity, which is something that skillful myth-maker needs to explain.

== Myth of Antemurale Christianitatis ==
One of the religious versions of this myth is often regarded as myth of Antemurale Christianitatis which implies a certain nation's mission of being the first line of defense of Europe against Islam.

The Champion of Christ (Latin: Athleta Christi) is honorary title used since 15th century and granted by pope to men who led military campaigns against Ottoman Empire. Those who were awarded with the title include: John Hunyadi, George Kastrioti Skanderbeg and Stephen the Great.

In the 16th century the "Defence against the Turks" had become central topic in East Central and South East Europe. It was put in functional use and served as propaganda tool and to mobilize religious feelings of the population. People who participated in campaigns against Ottoman Empire were referred to as "antemurale Christianitatis" (the protective wall of Christianity).

== Southeast Europe ==
The antemurale myth became an archetypal myth of nationhood in Southeastern Europe. Nationalists developed narratives about their nations being Antemurale Christianitatis who protect the West from the invasion of Islam, while the West ungratefully forgets this fact. Almost every nation in southeast Europe has perception and national myth of being bulwark of some universal system of values (Christianity, Islam,...).

=== Albania ===
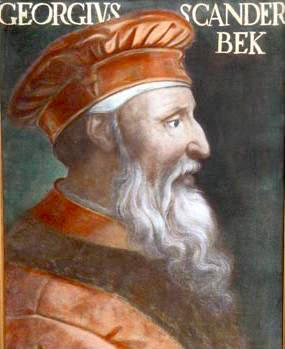
Skanderbeg is built-in part of the Antemurale myth

The Antemurale myth portrays Albanians as bulwark of civilisation and defenders of the religious tolerance in Europe and Balkans. Before Albanians were Islamized Antemurale myth presented Albanians as Antemurale Christianitatis. In Albanian nationalist myths Skanderbeg is a built-in part of the Antemurale myth complex which portrays Albanians united by Skanderbeg as protectors of the nation and Christendom against "invading Turks". After the Ottoman Empire implemented Islam into Albania, there is another example of Antemurale myth. The ulama's depiction of predominantly Muslim Albanians as bulwark of more civilized, religiously tolerant and democratic, opposed to undemocratic Greeks and Serbs who remained Orthodox.

=== Bosnia ===
The Bosnian Muslims (Bosniaks) were seen as a bulwark of Islam; the Ottoman frontier at Bosnia was perceived as the "Islamic border" toward the "enemy of the faith". When the Austrian army attacked Bosnia, Bosnian Muslims perceived their army as an "Islamic army" of "chosen soldiers" who "guard the Islamic borders".

=== Croatia ===
Pope Leo X called Croatia the Antemurale Christianitatis in 1519, given that Croatian soldiers made significant contributions to the struggle against the Turks. The idea of defending the West against East was proven to be of crucial importance for definition of the Croatian self-identity. Croats are perceived as defenders of the western world against barbarous East. The first form of Antemurale concept was aimed against Ottoman Empire and later against Serbs who were portrayed as the "last of the barbarians" which are "trying to invade Europe". The territorial rights of Croatians to land within borders of Croatia inhabited by Serbs (Krajina) were justified by racial differentiation between Croats and those Serbs. There were some attempts to ethnically separate Serbs living in Krajina from the rest of Serbs by claims that they were not of Slavic origin, but Vlachs who were settled in Croatia during the 16th century.

The Croatian Antemurale myth was seen through the perception of Roman Catholicism and its position toward other religions, as described in the Nesting Orientalisms concept. Because Croats adopted Roman Catholicism, they are presented as peace-loving, honest, civilized, democratic and more European than Serbs because they adopted Orthodox Christianity, which is more Eastern than Catholicism according to the Nesting Orientalism concept.

=== Serbia ===
The Antemurale myth is one of the most important Serbian myths and has a very long tradition in historiography in Serbia and academic and political discourse portray Serbs as the defenders of Christian European civilisation. The Antemurale myth in Serbia does not refer only to medieval history and events like the Battle of Kosovo where Serbs are portrayed as altruists who defend entire civilization of the west against attacks of Ottomans. The NATO bombing of Serbia in 1999 was interpreted through antemurale concept in which FR Yugoslavia heroically defended the world against US domination.

== Central Europe ==
In Central Europe the Antemurale myth evolved. In the medieval period it emphasised the mission of protecting the West from the Turks and Cossacks. The 19th century saw Russia as the enemy; the 20th century sought bulwarks against communism.

=== Poland ===
The concept of antemurale in Poland has its origin in that nation's geopolitical position. At the beginning this myth was employed to justify the defense of Catholic Europe against Turks, Tartars, and Orthodox Russia, and later against Communism or Fascism.

Starting from the middle of the 15th century, national consciousnesses and political thought in Poland was influenced by the perception of Poland being part of civilized west on the border of non-European barbaric pagan east. In the late 17th century, the king of Polish–Lithuanian Commonwealth, John III Sobieski, allied himself with Leopold I, Holy Roman Emperor to impose crushing defeats on the Ottoman Empire. In 1683 the Battle of Vienna marked a turning point in struggle against the Islamic Ottoman Empire. For its centuries-long stance against the Muslim advances, the Commonwealth would gain the name of Antemurale Christianitatis (bulwark of Christianity).

An additional version of the perception of Poland as a bulwark emerged in the 20th century. Some Polish ideologists, like Roman Dmowski (1864–1939), viewed Poland as partner of Russia in controlling Germany. The Antemurale myth revived in Poland in the 1980s with the rise of Solidarity. The new form portrayed Poland as defender of European countries against atheistic communism.

As one of the consequences of Antemurale myth in Poland, the Polish elite concluded that Poland had a right to be "rescued" by the civilized world because they believed that Poland's cause was the cause of the whole civilized world. In the vision of the poet Adam Mickiewicz, the persecution and suffering of the Poles was to bring salvation to other persecuted nations, just as the death of crucified Christ brought redemption to mankind. Thus the phrase "Poland the Christ of Nations" ("Polska Chrystusem narodów") was born.

== Eastern Europe ==
=== Russia ===
One Russian version of history sees Mother Russia as Europe's last bulwark against invading Mongol hordes in the early 13th century, Orthodox Christianity's defence against Asian "otherness", and the civilised response to Islamic expansionism.

=== Ukraine ===
The Ukrainians, living on the religious borderlands of Christian Europe with the Islamic Tatars and Ottomans saw themselves as "the bastion of Christianity".
