= Haedong Samgukdo =

Historic Korean map

- Hangul: 해동삼국도
- Hanja: 海東三國圖
- Revised Romanization: Haedong Samgukdo
- McCune–Reischauer: Haedong Samgukto

Haedong Samkukdo (Korean: 해동삼국도; lit. map of three eastern countries) is a historic Korean map drawn by an anonymous author. It is a crude road map from Manchuria to the southern coast of China, Taiwan, Ryukyu, Japan, and Joseon. It is kept at Kyujanggak, the former Joseon royal library, now located in Seoul National University, Seoul, South Korea. The map is 248.0 cm by 264.4 cm.

The map's accuracy is superior to that of other maps from the same era. It is assumed that some parts of China were based on Hwangyeocheonramdo, and parts of Joseon referred to Dongkukjido drawn by Jeong Sanggi (정상기). Japan is described in detail except for Hokkaido, and the western coast line of Taiwan is also shown in the map. The map shows that Eastern Asia was becoming a defined area, with precise information of roads, post-houses, and signal-fires.

Joseon had no interest in road information before this map. The utility of the map came to fruition in the age of Yeongjo of Joseon, who ruled from 1724 to 1726. Many maps of East Asia were drawn showing Joseon as a cultural core among neighboring countries; their aims were to prove their cultural pride rather than accurate depict the geographical layout of the area.

Haedongsamkukdo was a new type of map in terms of being a more objective and realistic recognition of Eastern Asia in the late Joseon era.
