= Vele Srakane =

Island of Croatia

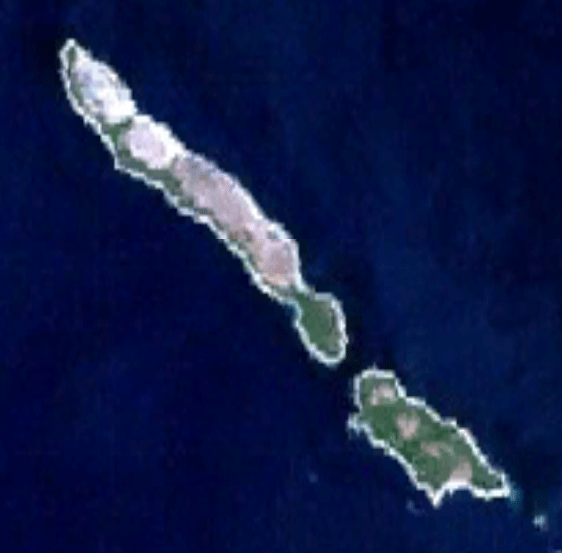
- Satellite image of Vele Srakane (bigger) and Male Srakane (smaller)

- Location within Croatia
- Interactive map of Vele Srakane

Geography
- Location: Adriatic Sea
- Coordinates: 44.582245°N 14.309671°E
- Area: 1.15 km^{2} (0.44 sq mi)
- Highest elevation: 59 m (194 ft)
- Highest point: Vela straža

Administration
- Croatia
- County: Primorje-Gorski Kotar County

Demographics
- Population: 4 (2021)

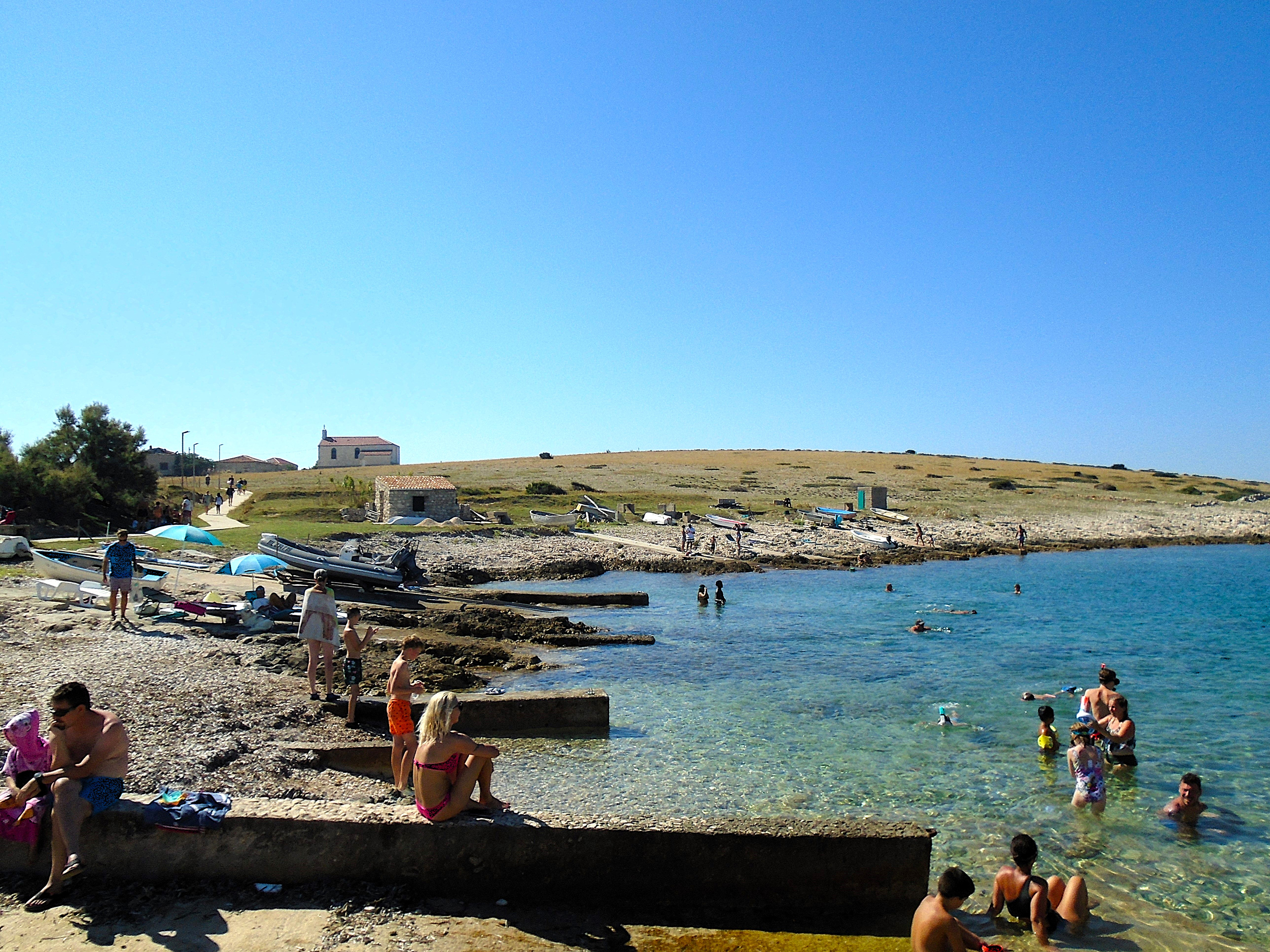
Small beach and grounded boats in the background

Vele Srakane (lit. 'Great Srakane'; Italian: Canidole Grande) is an island in the Croatian part of Adriatic Sea. It is situated between Lošinj, Unije and Susak, just north of Male Srakane. Its area is 1.15 km^{2}, and as of 2021, it had a population of 4, down from 8 in 2001.

Administratively, it is part of the town of Mali Lošinj. Highest peak is Vela straža, 59 meters high. As of 2012 there are no cars, no shops and no running water on the island. Electricity, however, is available.

There is no harbour suitable for sheltering on the island, just two concrete piers unsuitable for longer containment, and the coast contains numerous reefs. This leads the islanders to ground their boats rather than anchor them.

The island has been inhabited since prehistory. On Vela Straža, there are remnants of this prehistoric settlement. In the main part of the village one can see the fantastic ruins of the house where Ivo Andrić, the author of 'The Bridge on the Drina' and Nobel Prize winner is said to have lived during his childhood.
