= Male Srakane =

Island of Croatia

Nickname: Canidole Piccola
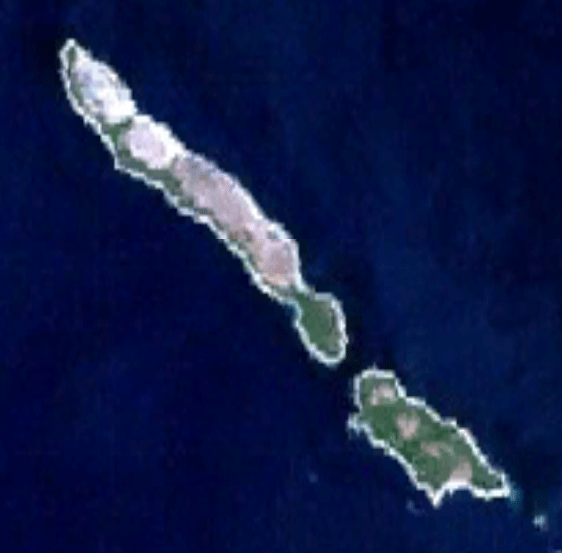
- Satellite image of Vele Srakane (bigger) and Male Srakane (smaller)

- Location within Croatia
- Interactive map of Male Srakane

Geography
- Location: Adriatic Sea, Kvarner Bay
- Coordinates: 44.56434°N 14.33129°E
- Archipelago: Cres-Lošinj archipelago
- Area: 0.605 km^{2} (0.234 sq mi)
- Coastline: 3.92 km (2.436 mi)

Administration
- Croatia
- County: Primorje-Gorski Kotar County
- Capital and largest city: Male Srakane (pop. 3)

Demographics
- Population: 3 (2025)
- Pop. density: 3.30/km^{2} (8.55/sq mi)

Additional information
- Vehicle registration: RI (Rijeka) (no cars); Boats: ML (Mali Lošinj)

Male Srakane (lit. 'Little Srakane'; Italian: Canidole Piccola) is an island in the Croatian part of the Adriatic Sea, situated between Lošinj, Unije and Susak, just south of Vele Srakane. Administratively, it is part of the town of Mali Lošinj. As of 2025, it has a population of 3.

== Name ==
During the Austro-Hungarian Empire (until the end of World War I) the two islands were called Klein- und Gross-Kanidol.

== Inhabitants ==
According to statistics, it has a current, reported population of just three people, who reside on the island during the whole year. The inhabitants usually make a living from fishing and agriculture. In 1940-50 approximately 30 people made a living on the island and by late 1960 only two women remained on the island. The three residents who live on the island are not original residents.
