= Lubenice =

Ancient fort city in Croatia

Lubenice Lubenizze
- Village
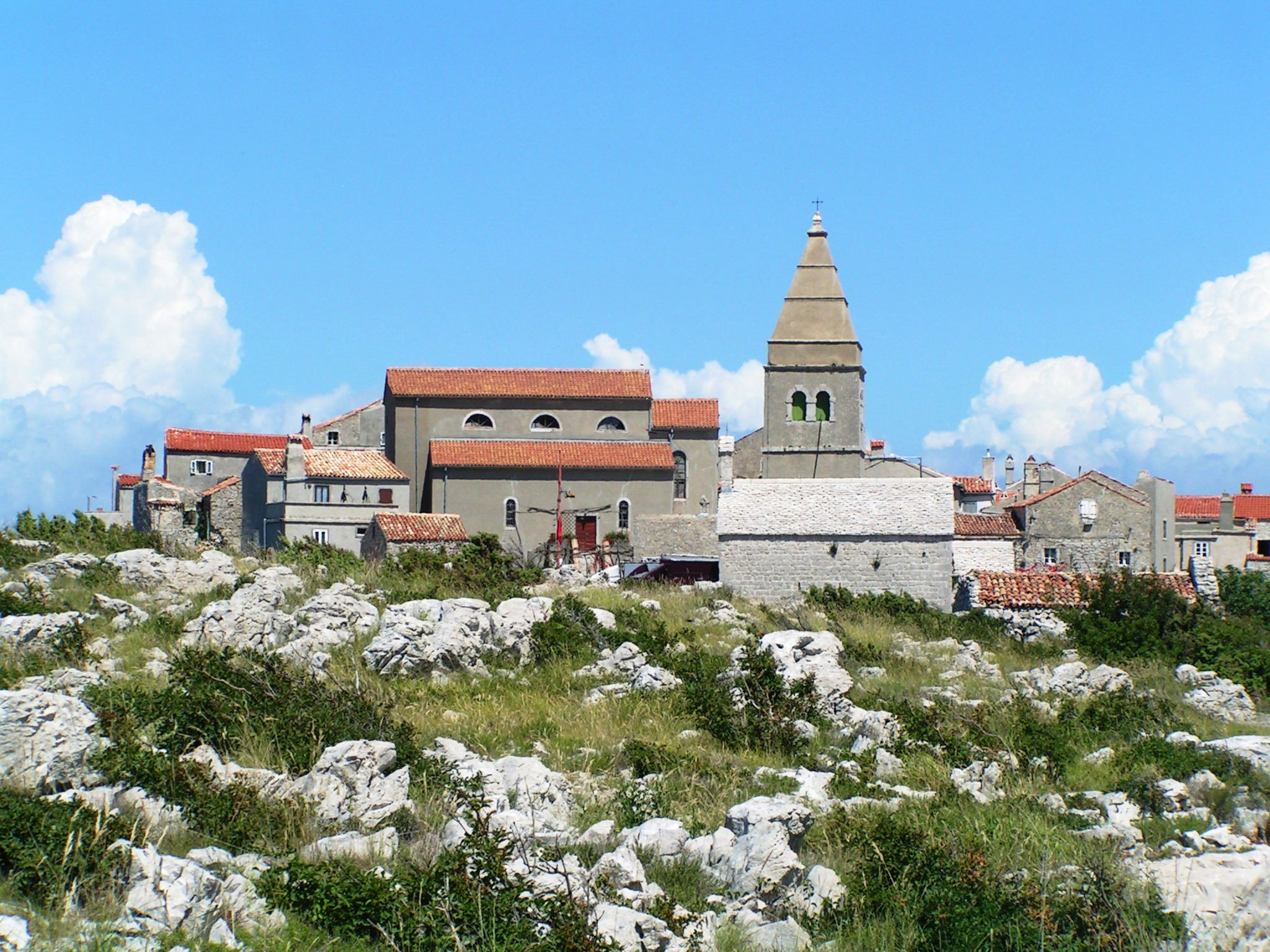
- View of Lubenice

- Location within Croatia
- Coordinates: 44.88784°N 14.33160°E
- Country: Croatia
- County: Primorje-Gorski Kotar
- Town: Cres

Area
  - Total: 7.8 km^{2} (3.0 sq mi)
- Elevation: 378 m (1,240 ft)

Population (2021)
  - Total: 6
  - Density: 0.77/km^{2} (2.0/sq mi)
- Time zone: UTC+1 (CET)
  - Summer (DST): UTC+2 (CEST)
- Postal code: 51557
- Area code: 051
- Vehicle registration: RI

Lubenice (Croatian pronunciation: [luběnit͡sɛ], Italian: Lubenizze), historically known as Ljubenice or Zubjenice, is an ancient fortified settlement on the Croatian island of Cres. It sits on a ridge 380 m-high (1,250 ft) above the Adriatic Sea and may have been inhabited as early as 4,000 years ago. Today, Lubenice is a small local centre with around forty buildings and only six permanent residents. Most of its structures are built from the same stone as the surrounding cliffs. Part of the settlement dates back to the Roman period. The town was once walled, although very little remains of the walls apart from two gates and some of the eastern portion. There are 9 churches in the town; an unusually high number for its population, explained in part by the relative financial independence of the town in the late medieval period. Today, it is almost a ghost town for most of the year, but in the summer it is a prominent tourist destination for its beaches, cliffs and proximity to Lake Vrana.

== Etymology ==
Its name is sometimes connected in folk etymology, with the South Slavic term lubenica "Citrullus lanatus", though the local Chakavian dialect uses the borrowing angȗrija (< Venetian anguria "watermelon" < Greek ἀγγουριον "cucumber") instead and consequently has alternative folk etymologies. It was proposed by Petar Skok to refer to the cold winters, connecting the name to the Roman oikonym Hibernitia/Hibernicia.

== Geography ==
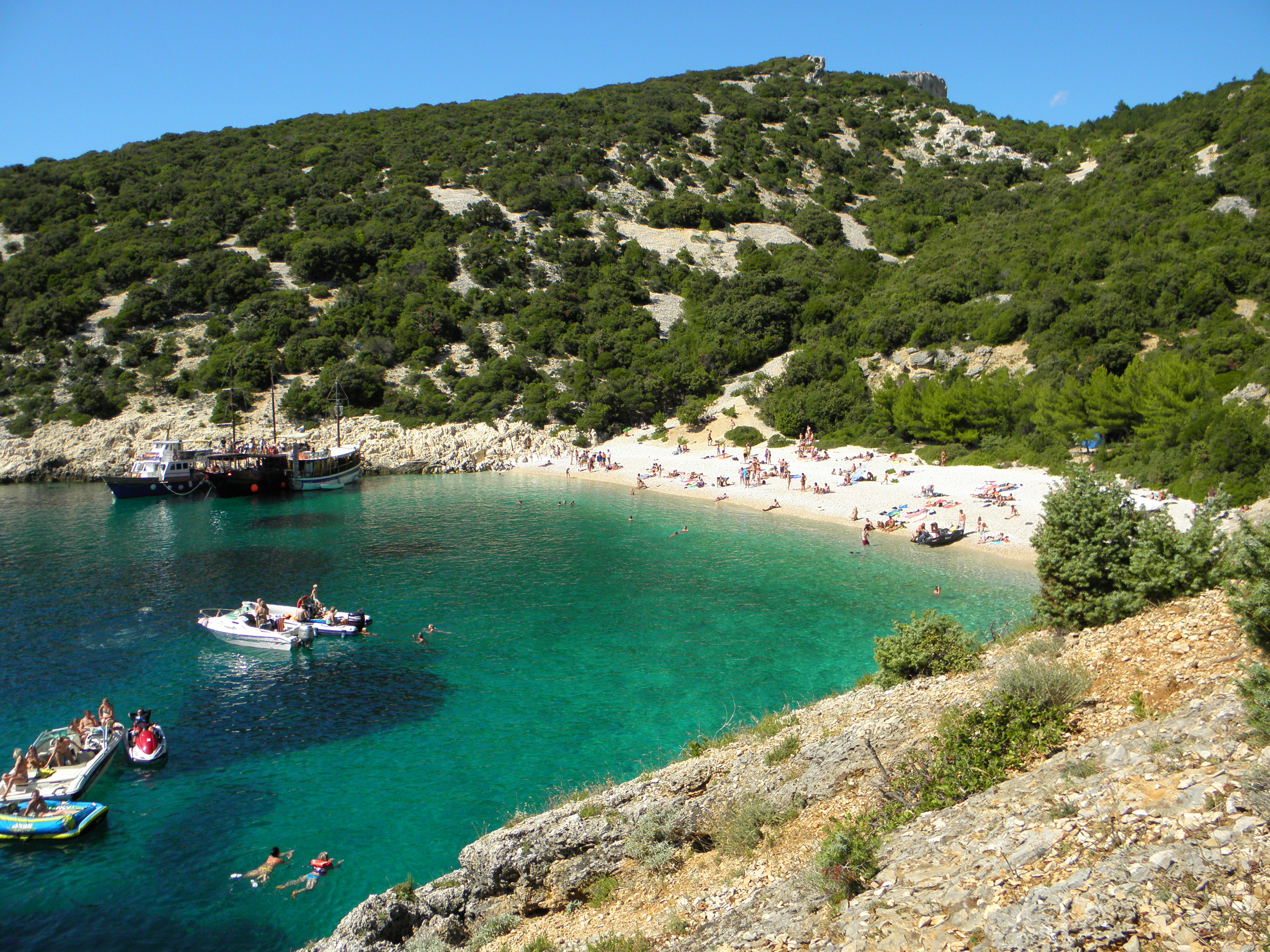
Lubenice - Plaza Plava Grota

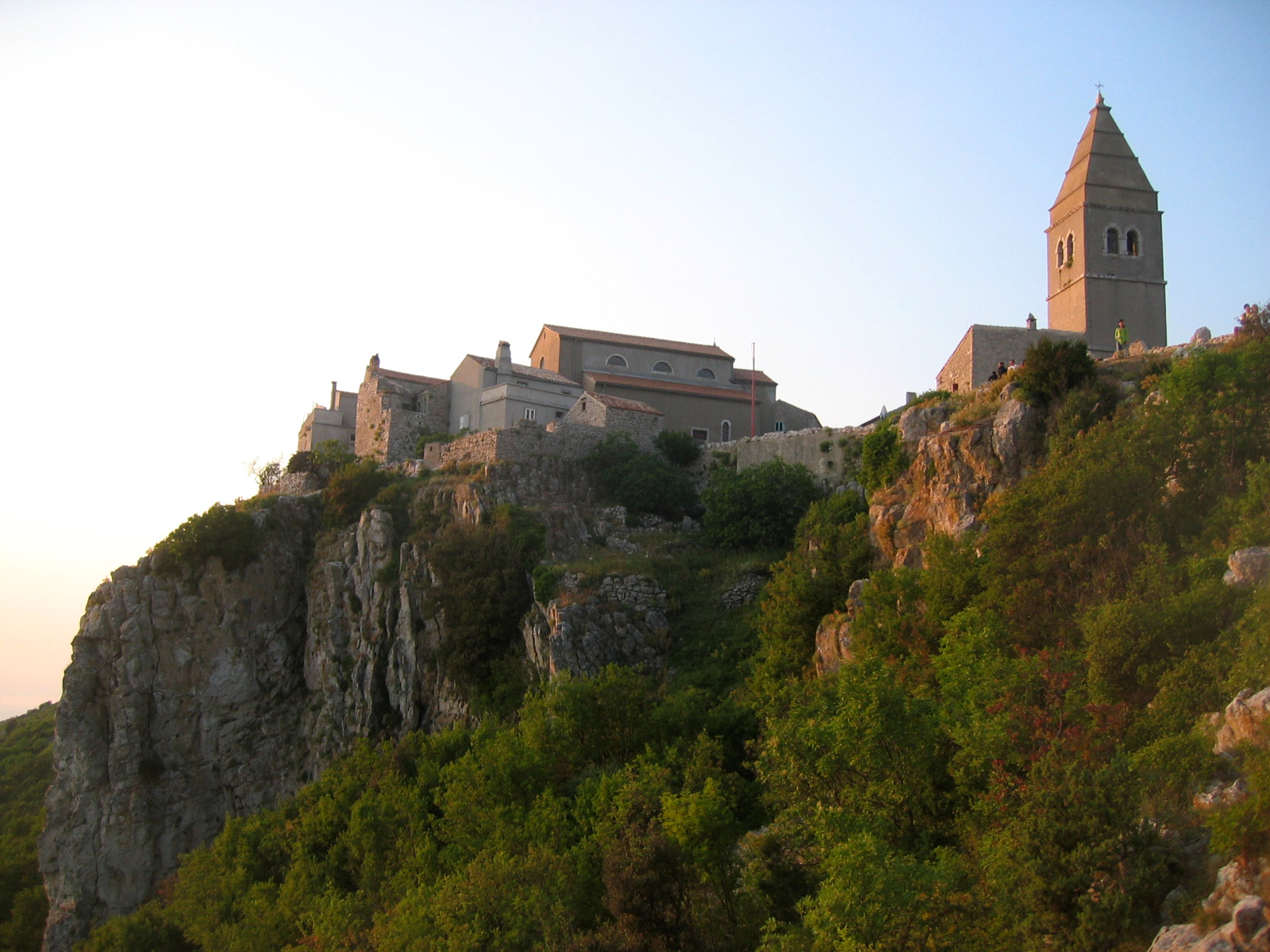
Town with cliff

Lubenice is located on a part of the island known as Gerbin, a peninsula that also includes Zbičina, Valun and Pernat. Excluding narrow trails, the nearest connections by road to the sea are at Valun and Martinšćica, and to the nearby Lake Vrana at Zbičina.

The town is built on a cliff whose ledge lies at an elevation of 378 m (1,240 ft). Alongside several nearby cliffs, this cliff has been developed as a sport climbing location. The first routes were equipped in 2000, and the routes were renovated and expanded in 2017–2018. As of 2025, there are 34 routes.

There are two land-accessible pebble beaches nearby: Sveti Ivan ("Luka") and Žanja, although the latter requires descending a narrow switchback trail. These are usually ranked among the best on Cres. There are also several such beaches only accessible from the sea or by relatively dangerous paths (Miračine, a different Luka, Skopji bok a.k.a. Nedjelja, Karjotul, Prašćarići, Vrutek)

In the Žanja bay, there is a 74 m-long (243 ft) flank margin sea cave Plava Grota (HR00727), also known as Plava špilja or Škuja va Žanji. From the main entrance it is only 2.7 m (8 ft 10 in) deep, but the total vertical difference from the highest point to the lowest point in the cave is 10.7 m (35 ft). There are a total of 6 larger entrances along with a number of smaller entrances, some partly or completely submerged. The total volume of the cave is 5,100 m^{3} (180,000 cu ft). The cave was once larger, but coastal erosion has led to the loss of space at the entrance, with an orientation particularly vulnerable to the large waves of the sirocco. It formed in Pleistocene breccia in the zone of freshwater-saltwater mixing. Seasonal freshwater springs within the cave have a marked influence on the temperature of the water inside. Its largest chamber is 27×24 m. On 7 October 2007 it was explored by the Speleološki klub "Samobor" and the Inštituta za raziskovanje krasa (Postojna), who produced a topographic map of the cave and conducted geomorphological and hydrochemical analyses. It was the first flank margin cave to be described along the Adriatic Sea. It is thought to have formed during the MIS 5e highstand, unrelated to the hydrology of Lake Vrana. Several smaller caves and rock shelters have formed in the same breccia near the cave. The cave's formation was the main subject of a detailed 2010 study.

Nearby (44.87107°N 14.33604°E) at elevation is the large cave Morska peć, with constant drippage of water, for the collection of which a well has been constructed.

Other caves in the Lubenice area include Grancina (HR02011), 9 m (30 ft) deep and with 59 m (194 ft) of passageway; and Škuja na lokvice (HR02448), 26 m (85 ft) deep and with 30 m (98 ft) of passageway. There is also a pit cave in the Nevestina area, to the right of the road into Ledenice.

There is a spring at a low elevation on the south end of the Sveti Ivan bay.

The Sveti Ivan bay has one islet, Zakamik, connected to the island only by a submerged isthmus.

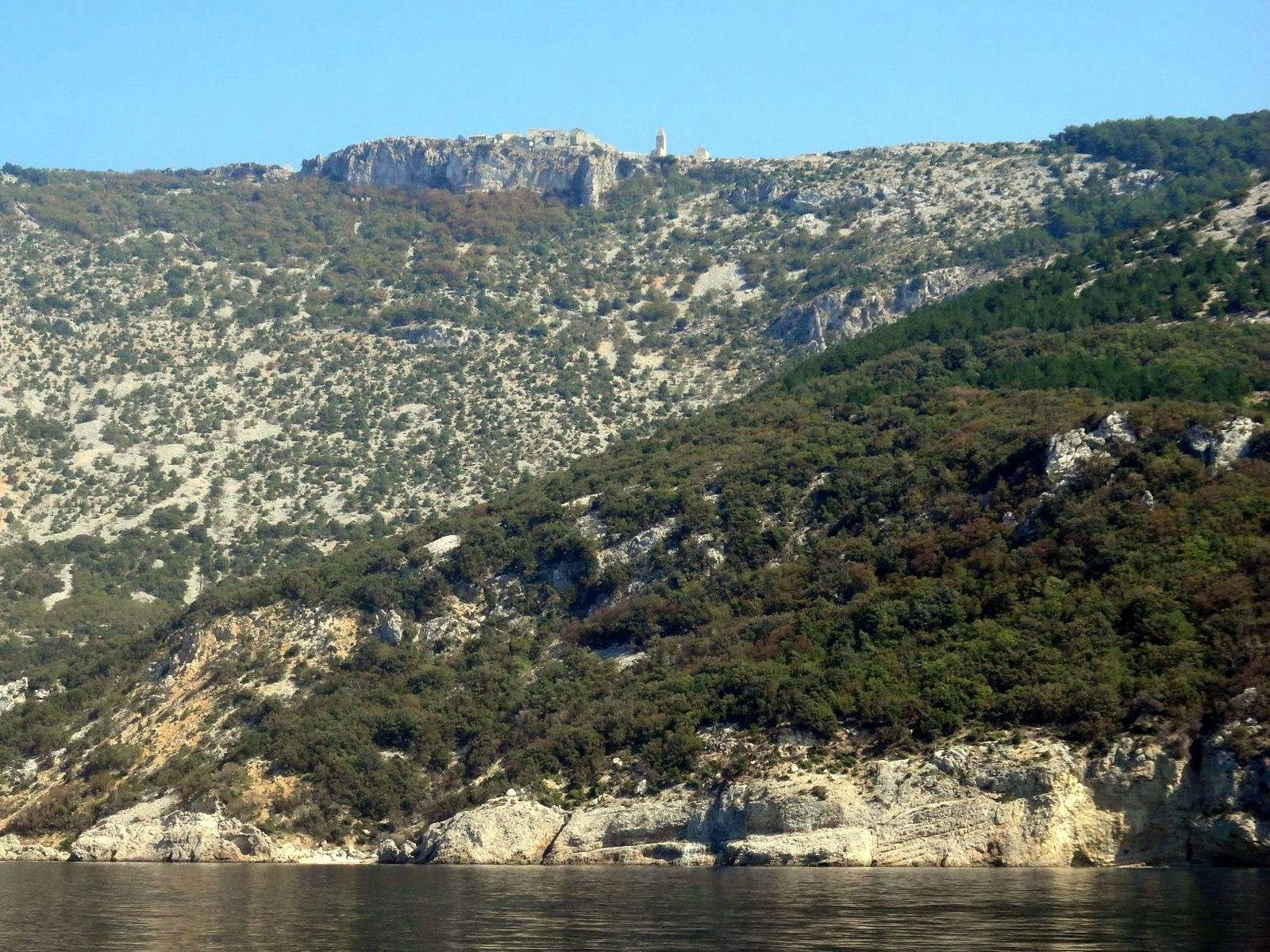
View from sea

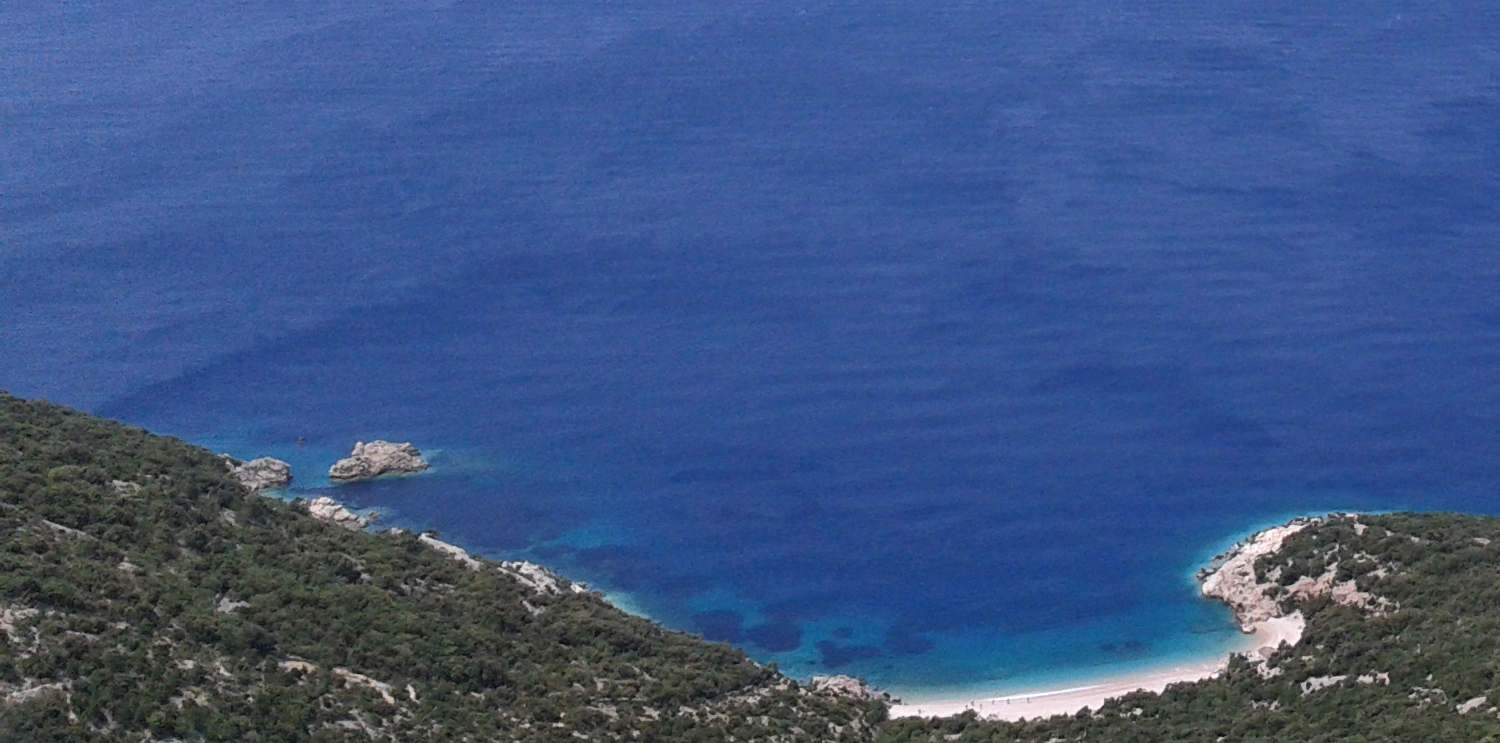
Sveti Ivan beach (above)

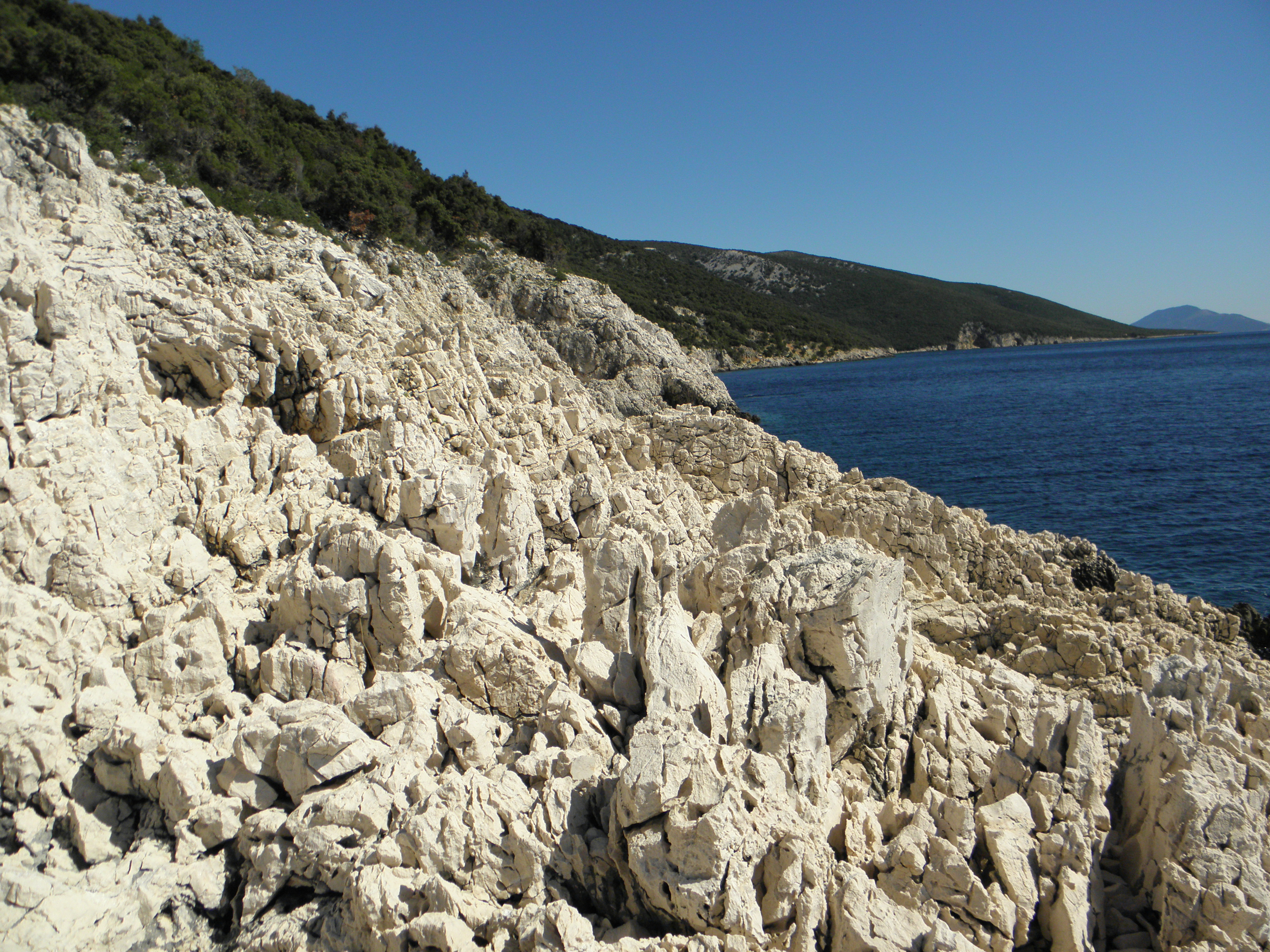
Coastal rocks

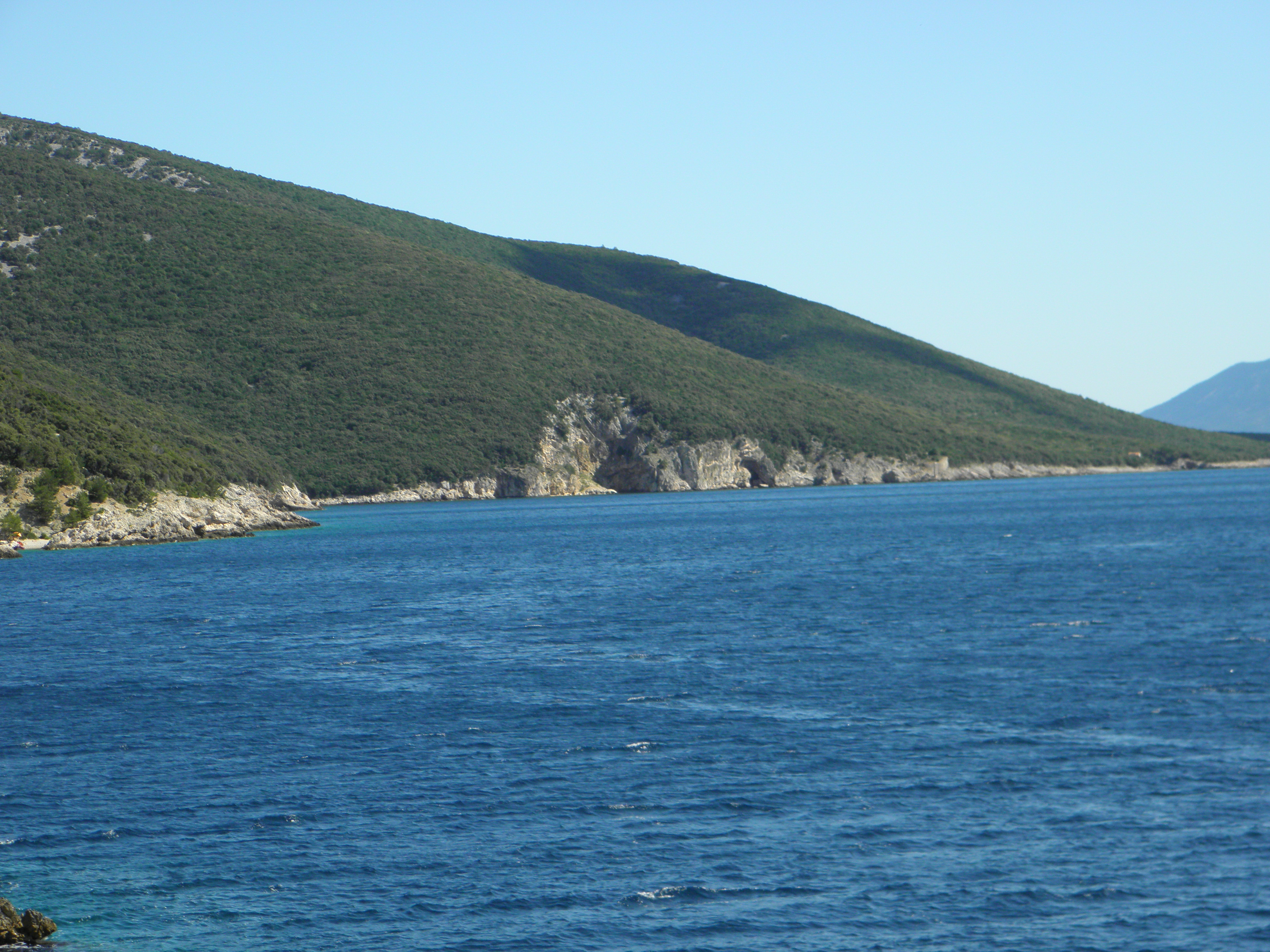
Sea cliffs

== Architecture ==
=== Sacral ===
Despite its small population, Lubenice has one of the highest concentrations of churches on the island, alongside Cres, Osor, Mali Lošinj and Veli Lošinj.

The Sv. Nedjelje chapel (44.88676°N 14.33251°E), first on the left on the paved road entering the town, dedicated to Holy Sunday, is a Romanesque church, currently in a ruined state. It may be the oldest church in Lubenice, but the foundations of the current parish church are largely unexplored.

The Sv. Antuna pustinjaka chapel (44.88716°N 14.33211°E), second to the left on the paved road entering the town, dedicated to saint Anthony the Great, is one of the oldest Gothic buildings with a quadratic apse on the island, alongside Svetog Petra near Hrasta, south of Lubenice. It is 12 m (39 ft) long with a 6 m-wide (20 ft) façade, with a side portal on the north. It is of Franciscan origin, constructed in the early 15th century. It was renovated in 2000–2003.

The Sv. Nikole chapel (44.8876°N 14.33125°E) is outside the city walls, next to the belltower of the Pohođenja Blažene Djevice Marije church. It too was built in the late 14th or early 15th century.

The Pohođenja Blažene Djevice Marije church (44.8876°N 14.332155°E), dedicated to the Annunciation (although Candlemas is the chief parish holiday), servers as the parish church. It was built on the site of an older parish church in the 18th century, while its belltower was built in the early 19th century.

The Sv. Jakova i Barbare chapel (44.88818°N 14.33177°E), dedicated to saints James and Barbara, is situated along the east wall of the town, next to the old parish priest's house, which dates to the early 19th century. century. The complex of the parish priest's house has been listed as Z-2686 in the Register of Cultural Goods of Croatia since 2005.

The Sv. Stjepana cemetery chapel (44.88901°N 14.33067°E), dedicated to saint Stephen, is just north of the town, outside its walls. It was finished in 1772.

Outside the town in a line with Sv. Stjepana towards the hills are the medieval chapels Sv. Mihovila (44.8898°N 14.3339°E), dedicated to the archangel Michael, and Sv. Petra (44.8876°N 14.3369°E), dedicated to saint Peter. There is also a medieval chapel Sv. Ivana (44.8800°N 14.3244°E) in the location Pod Lubenice, closer to the Sveti Ivan bay than to Lubenice itself. Sv. Mihovila is in a degraded state, while Sv. Petra and Sv. Ivana are in ruins.

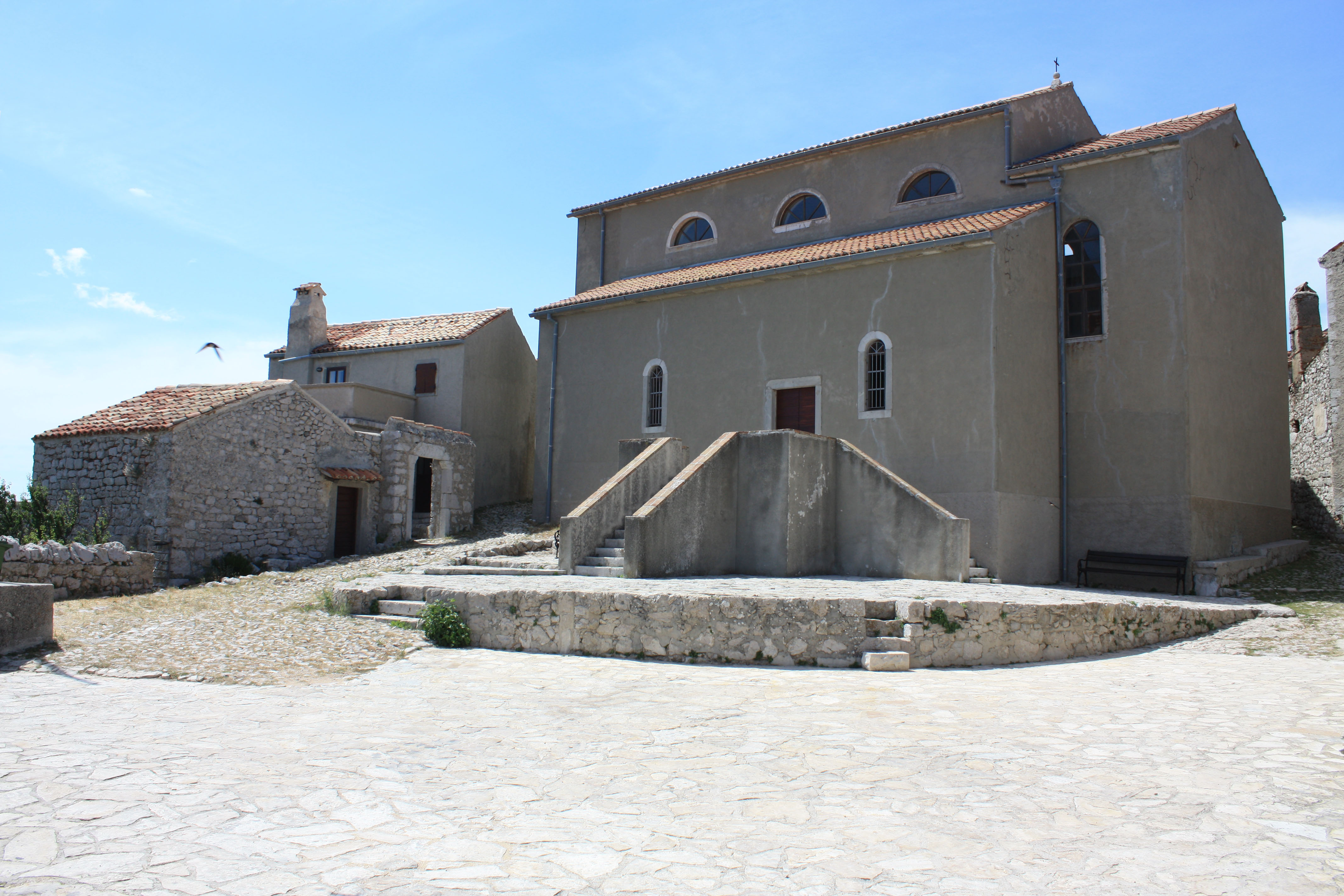
Parish church

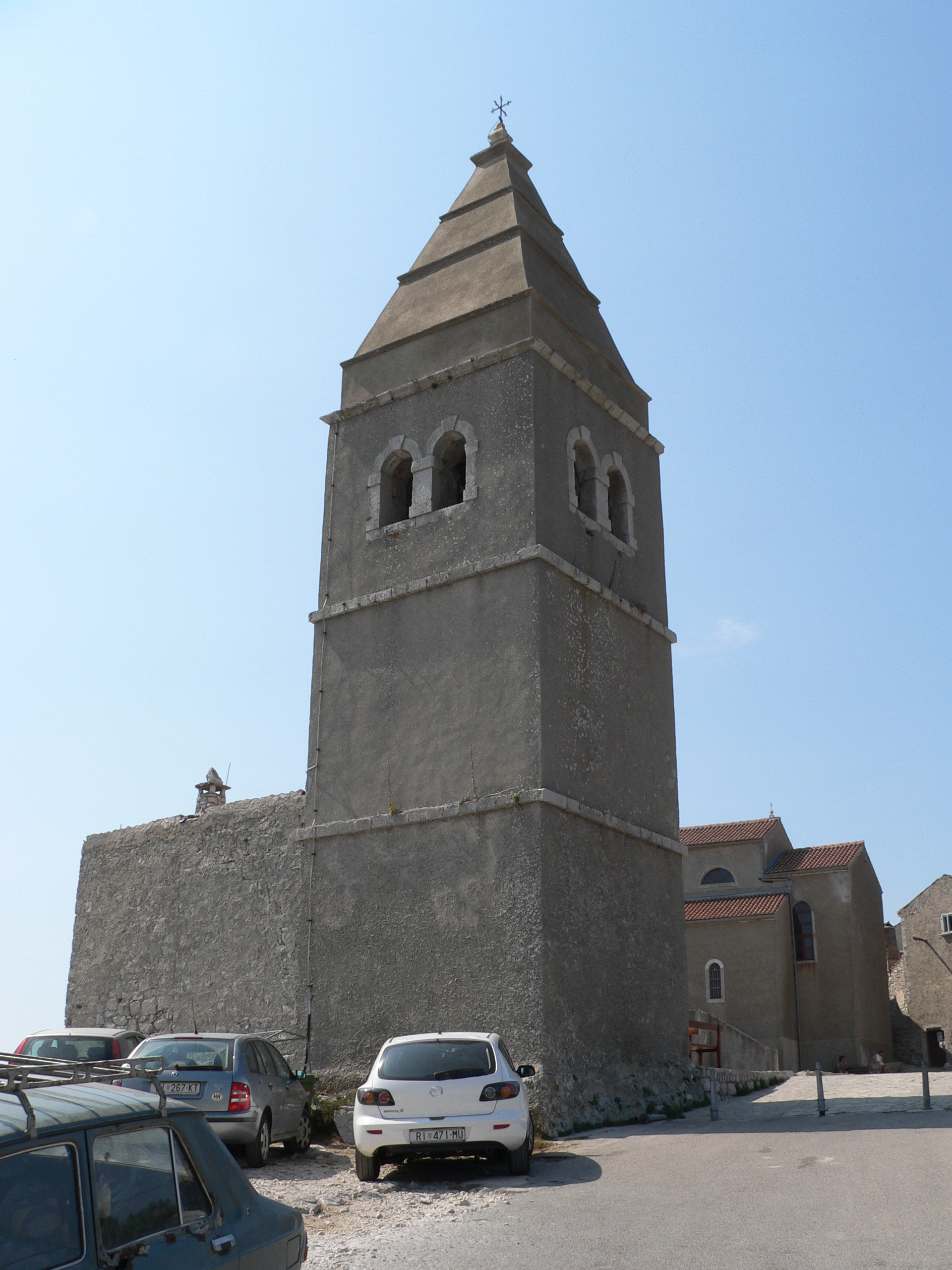
Belltower

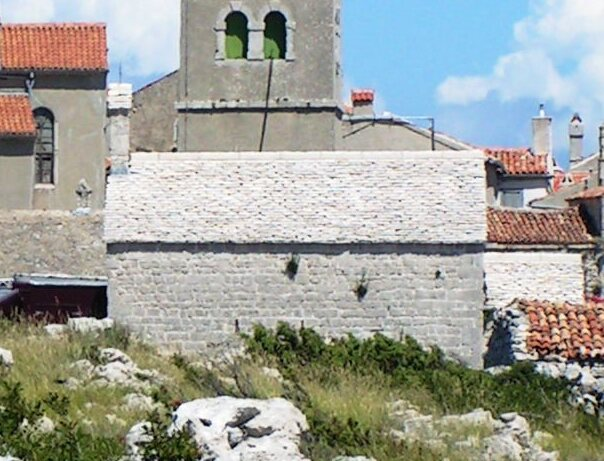
Sv. Nikole chapel

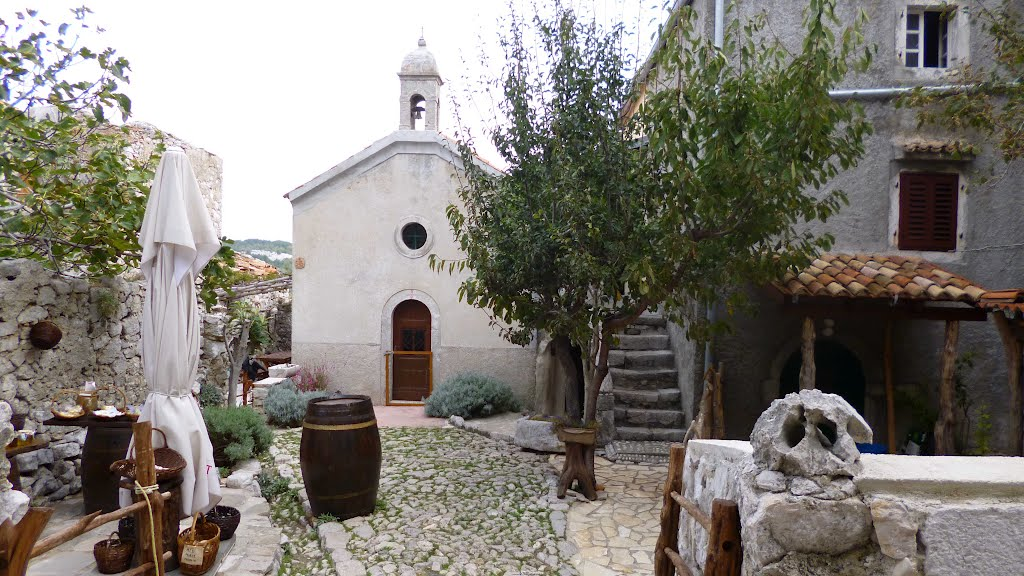
Sv. Jakova i Barbare chapel

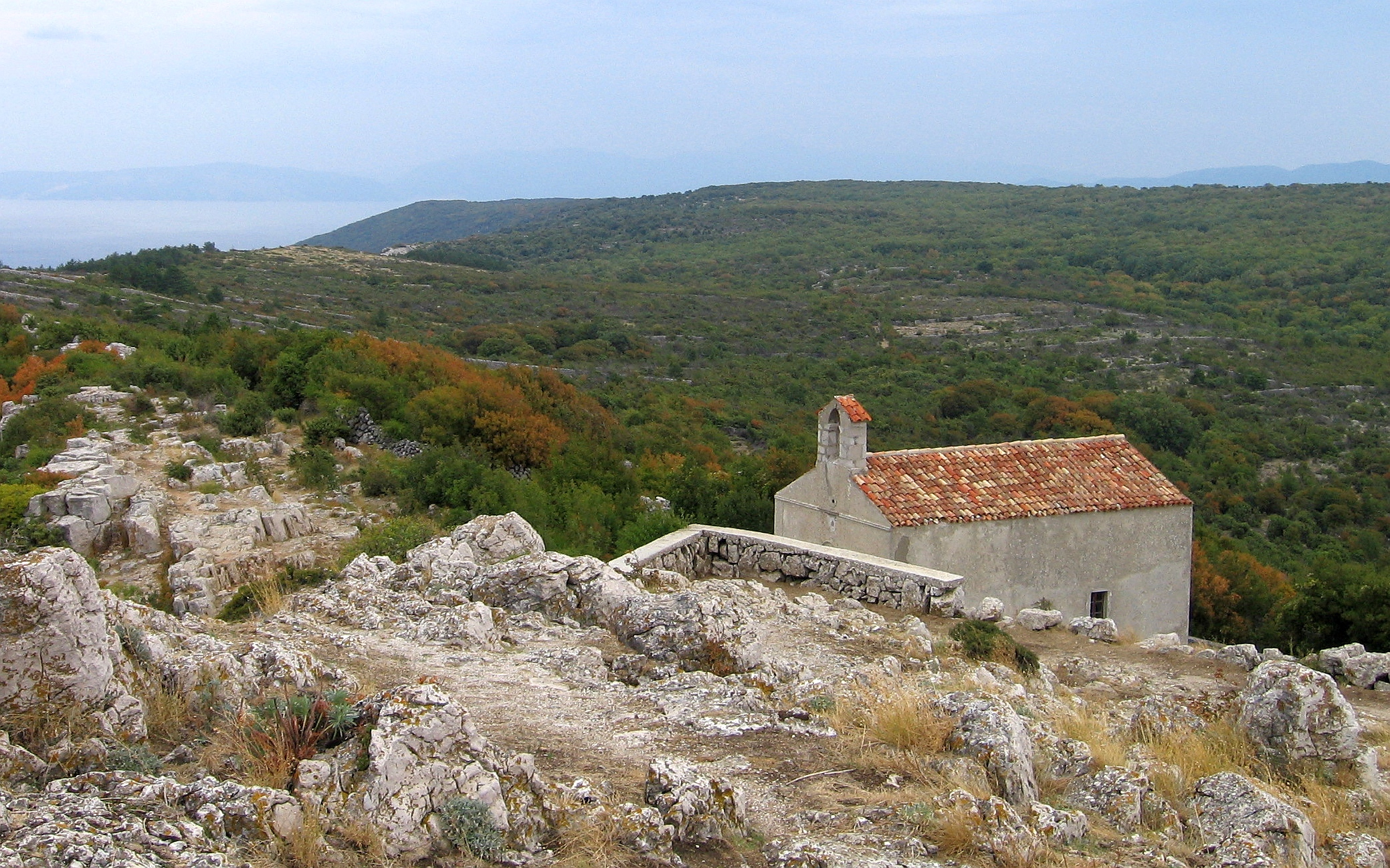
Sv. Stjepan chapel

=== Secular ===
The road leading from Mali Podol to Lubenice was built in 1962 and asphalted in 1980, and remains the only asphalted route to the town. Within the town, traditional pavement dominates, but even the main streets are often just compacted natural soil.

Lubenice is known for its concentration of intact dry stone architecture, which in places continues to be maintained to the present. Architect Andre Mohorovičić dated some of them to the prehistoric era. The dry stone walls in the Ograda and Presleh areas were formed in part to create pasture, since the natural vegetation of the uplands of Cres is relatively scarce.

Although most of the city walls have been reused to build houses, two of their gates remain. One on the north, and one on the southeast. Much of the eastern wall survives The walls date to the 11th-17th centuries.

The plaza is at the entrance to the town, and is bound by the parish church with its belltower, including a well by the belltower. The well is no longer in traditional use, since the construction of the water storage tank VS Lubenice of capacity 100 m^{3} (3,500 cu ft) at an elevation of 399.37 m (1,310.3 ft) on the hill Vrh, the line running under the well and then north into the town. Adjacent to the belltower is the town loggia, built at the same time. Since 1989, the plaza hosts an annual music festival, the Lubeničke glazbene večeri. There are at least 12 wells within and in the immediate vicinity of the town.

The town still does not have a municipal wastewater system, although one is planned.

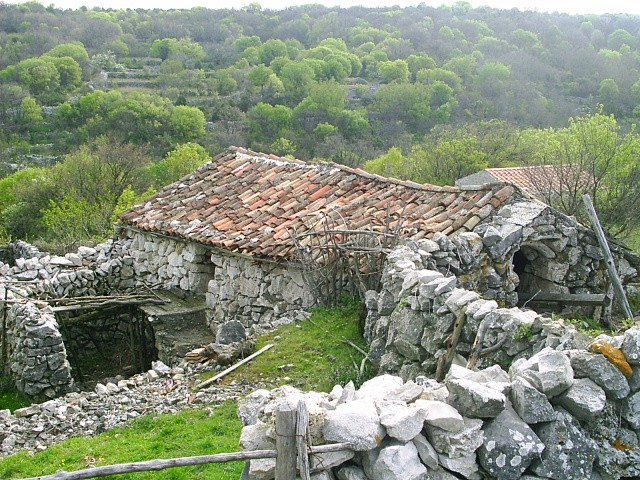
Dry stone enclosures

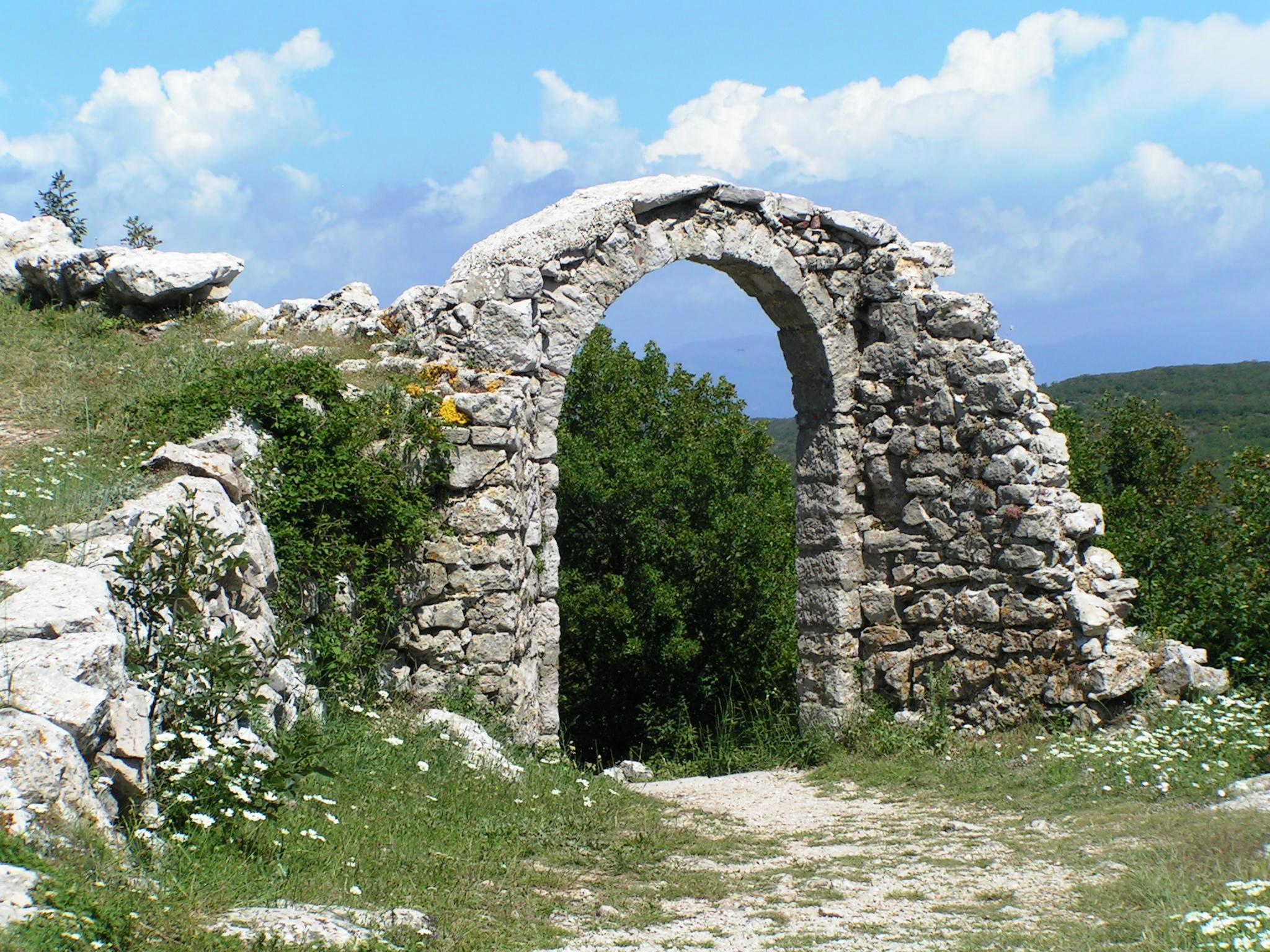
Southeast gate

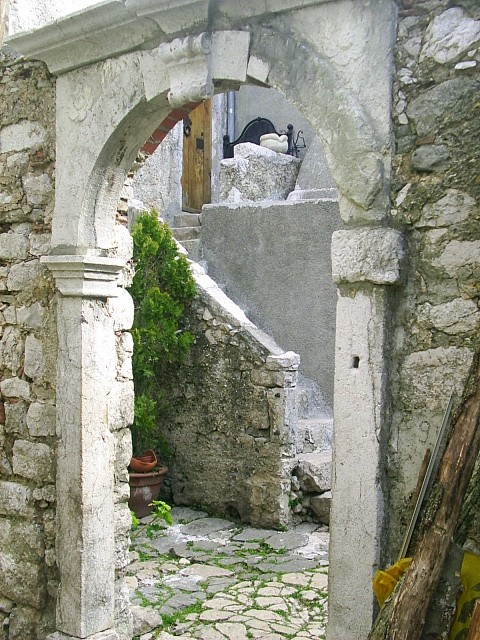
Portal

=== History ===
Lubenice was an independent commune until the Venetian government subjected it to the town of Cres in 1484, ten years before the same was done to Beli.

The Sv. Stjepana chapel was built in 1772.

Of the approximately 70 surviving residential buildings, 75% predate the 1821 cadastre, 4% were built between then and 1892, 12% between then and the fin de siècle, 7% between then and 1933 and 1% after 1933. About 30% of residential buildings have been abandoned, 14% are only used for tourism, 25% are only periodically inhabited, 24% are inhabited by "permanent" residents, and several buildings have been repurposed, for example as restaurants in the north.

The first cadastre was made by the Franciscans in 1821, followed by a cadastral map in 1830.

In the 19th century, an 8 grade primary school was built, as well as a post office and an općinska uprava.

The town was electrified in 1969.

It was nominated to be a UNESCO World Heritage site in 2005.

A sheep farming museum was founded inside of the former school on the north end of the town in 2008.

In 2023, a camp with a capacity of 200 beds was planned south of Lubenice to help slow the population decline. The nearest existing camps are in Valun (1060 beds) and Martinšćica (7050 beds).

== Demographics ==
In 1747, its parish had a population of 238. This grew to 249 in 1797, 348 in 1818, 357 in 1850, 410 in 1880, 562 in 1912. Lubenice itself in 1797 had 105 inhabitants in 20 families. In 1818 it had 131 inhabitants in 24 houses. Its cadastral općina had a population of 198 in 1869, 234 in 1880, 250 in 1910, 266 in 1945. Compare with the population of 185 in Lubenice itself in 1945. The population fell consistently after WWII. As of 2021, the permanent population of Lubenice is 1.

Village of Lubenice: Population trends 1857–2021
v

population	147	148	175	193	187	177	247	246	171	154	109	82	57	43	24	12	6
	1857	1869	1880	1890	1900	1910	1921	1931	1948	1953	1961	1971	1981	1991	2001	2011	2021

Note:Includes data for Zbičina in 1857, 1869, 1921 and 1931. Sources: Croatian Bureau of Statistics publications

Parish registers survive for Lubenice from 1700 on:

- HR-RiDAR 275, 299 (Christenings 1700–1819)
- HR-RiDAR 275, 300 (Christenings 1817–1826)
- HR-RiDAR 275, 301 (Christenings 1827–1891)
- (Marriages 1809–1816)
- HR-RiDAR 275, 302 (Marriages 1817–1826)
- HR-RiDAR 274, 303 (Marriages 1827–1891)
- HR-RiDAR 274, 304 (Marriages 1892–1901)
- HR-RiDAR 275, 305 (Deaths 1703–1818)
- HR-RiDAR 275, 306 (Deaths 1817–1827)
- HR-RiDAR 275, 307 (Deaths 1827–1891)

== Dialectology ==
The dialect of Lubenice exhibits /e/ as the reflex of the yers (in common with Cres, Sv. Vid by Merag, Orlec, Vrana, Belej, Stivan, Martinšćica, Podol, Valun, and Pernat), instead of the /a/ heard from Vodice north or Osor south. This connects it to the most archaic speech on the Kvarner islands, including that of Omišalj and Vrbnik on Krk. Consequently, the syllabic /r̥/ and /l̥/ become /er/ and /el/.

The younger phenomenon, under Venetian influence, of cakavism, includes Lubenice (in common with Valun, Cres, Mali Lošinj, Veli Lošinj, and Susak). It is absent from Glagolitic documents written on the island in the 16th and 17th centuries.

== Selected works ==
=== Architecture ===
- Solis, Inge (2014). Crkve i kapele cresko-lošinjskog arhipelaga. Vol. 1. ISBN 978-953-99919-7-3.
- Dlačić, Marijana (2016). Crkve i kapele cresko-lošinjskog arhipelaga. Vol. 2. ISBN 978-953-7902-15-5.
- Ćus-Rukonić, Jasminka (2013). Utvrde cresko-lošinjskog otočja od pretpovijesti do današnjih dana. Mali Lošinj: Lošinjski muzej. ISBN 978-953-7902-07-0.

=== Dialectology ===
- Velčić, Nikola (2003). Besedar Bejske Tramuntane. Beli: Tramuntana. ISBN 953-219-128-3.

== See also ==
- List of Tentative World Heritage Sites in Croatia
