= Vidovići =

Vidovići may refer to the following places:

== Bosnia and Herzegovina ==
- Vidovići, Bosansko Grahovo
- Vidovići, Visoko

== Croatia ==
- Vidovići, Croatia
