= Vrana, Cres =

Village in Primorje-Gorski Kotar, Croatia

Vrana Passo
- Village
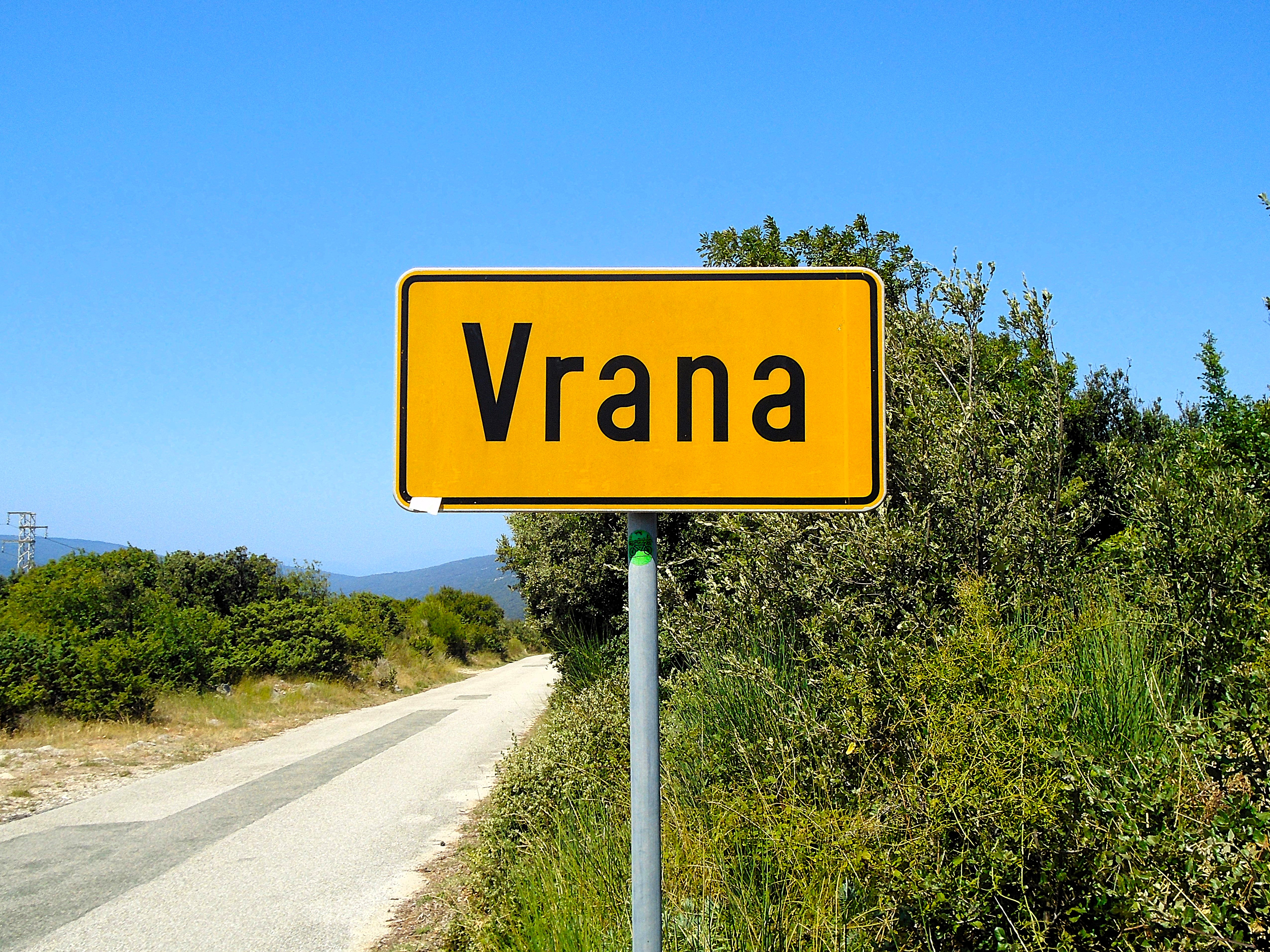
- place name road sign

- Location within Croatia
- Coordinates: 44.83687°N 14.41337°E
- Country: Croatia
- County: Primorje-Gorski Kotar
- Town: Cres

Area
  - Total: 18.9 km^{2} (7.3 sq mi)

Population (2021)
  - Total: 7
  - Density: 0.37/km^{2} (0.96/sq mi)
- Time zone: UTC+1 (CET)
  - Summer (DST): UTC+2 (CEST)
- Postal code: 51557
- Area code: 051
- Vehicle registration: RI

Vrana (Croatian pronunciation: [ʋrâna], Italian: Passo, Villa Vrana) is a village on the Croatian island of Cres, in Primorje-Gorski Kotar. Administratively, it is part of the town of Cres. As of 2021, it had a population of 7. It is located southeast of the eponymous Lake Vrana.
