= Mali Podol =

Village in Primorje-Gorski Kotar, Croatia

Mali Podol Podoli Piccolo
- Village
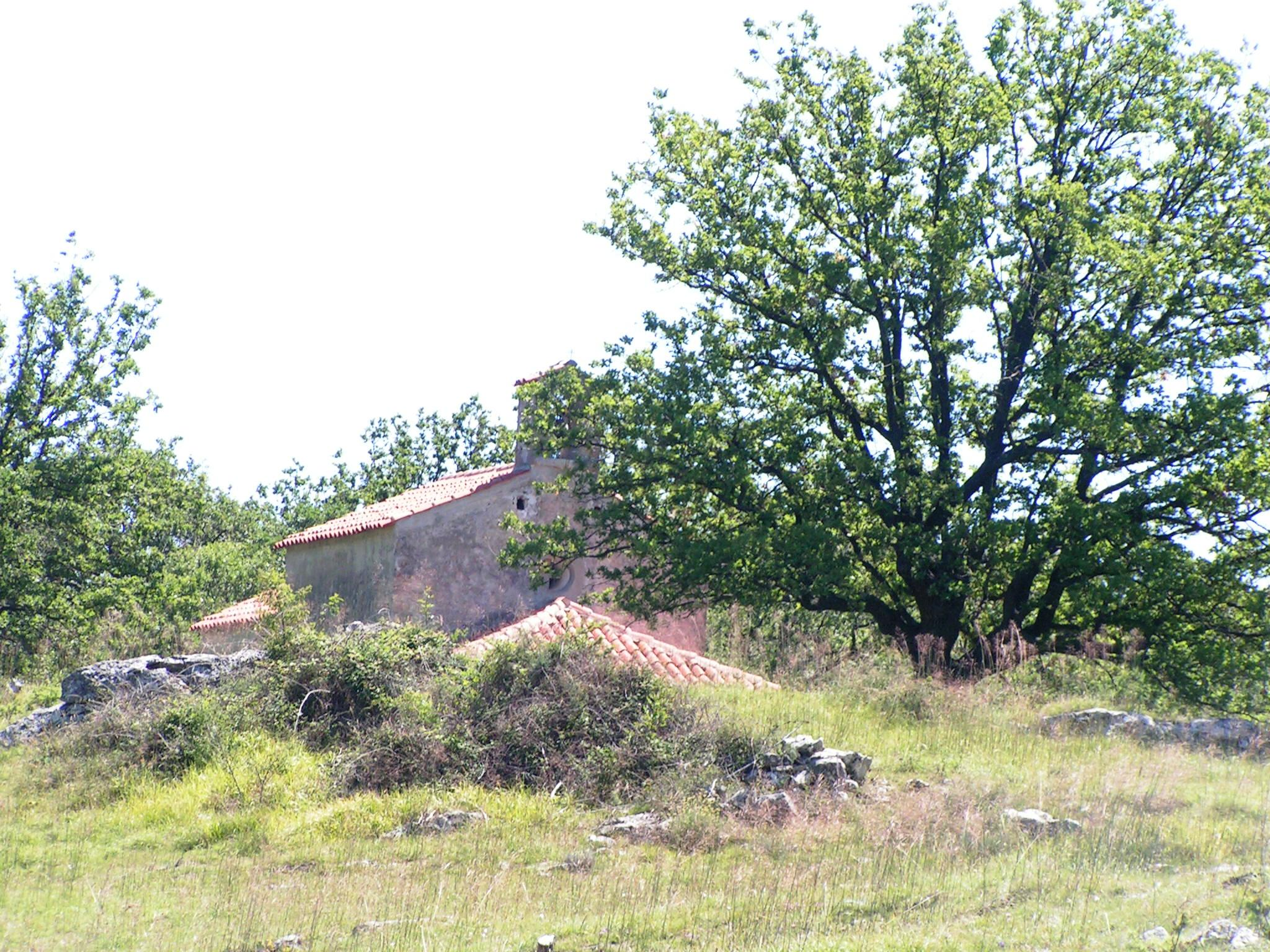
- Sv. Uršule church in Mali Podol

- Location within Croatia
- Coordinates: 44.87885°N 14.35774°E
- Country: Croatia
- County: Primorje-Gorski Kotar
- Town: Cres

Area
  - Total: 13.1 km^{2} (5.1 sq mi)

Population (2021)
  - Total: 3
  - Density: 0.23/km^{2} (0.59/sq mi)
- Time zone: UTC+1 (CET)
  - Summer (DST): UTC+2 (CEST)
- Postal code: 51557
- Area code: 051
- Vehicle registration: RI

Mali Podol (Italian: Podoli Piccolo, Pédol, Mallipodol, Podolli) is a village on the Croatian island of Cres, in Primorje-Gorski Kotar. Administratively, it is part of the town of Cres. As of 2021, it had a population of 3. It is located just to the northeast of Lake Vrana.

== Architecture ==
The Sv. Uršule church, dedicated to Saint Ursula, (Note: 44.8677°N 14.3595°E) is in the village.

A church dedicated to Saint Jerome (Note: 44.8619°N 14.3435°E) is at the edge of the plateau facing the sea.

== Gallery ==
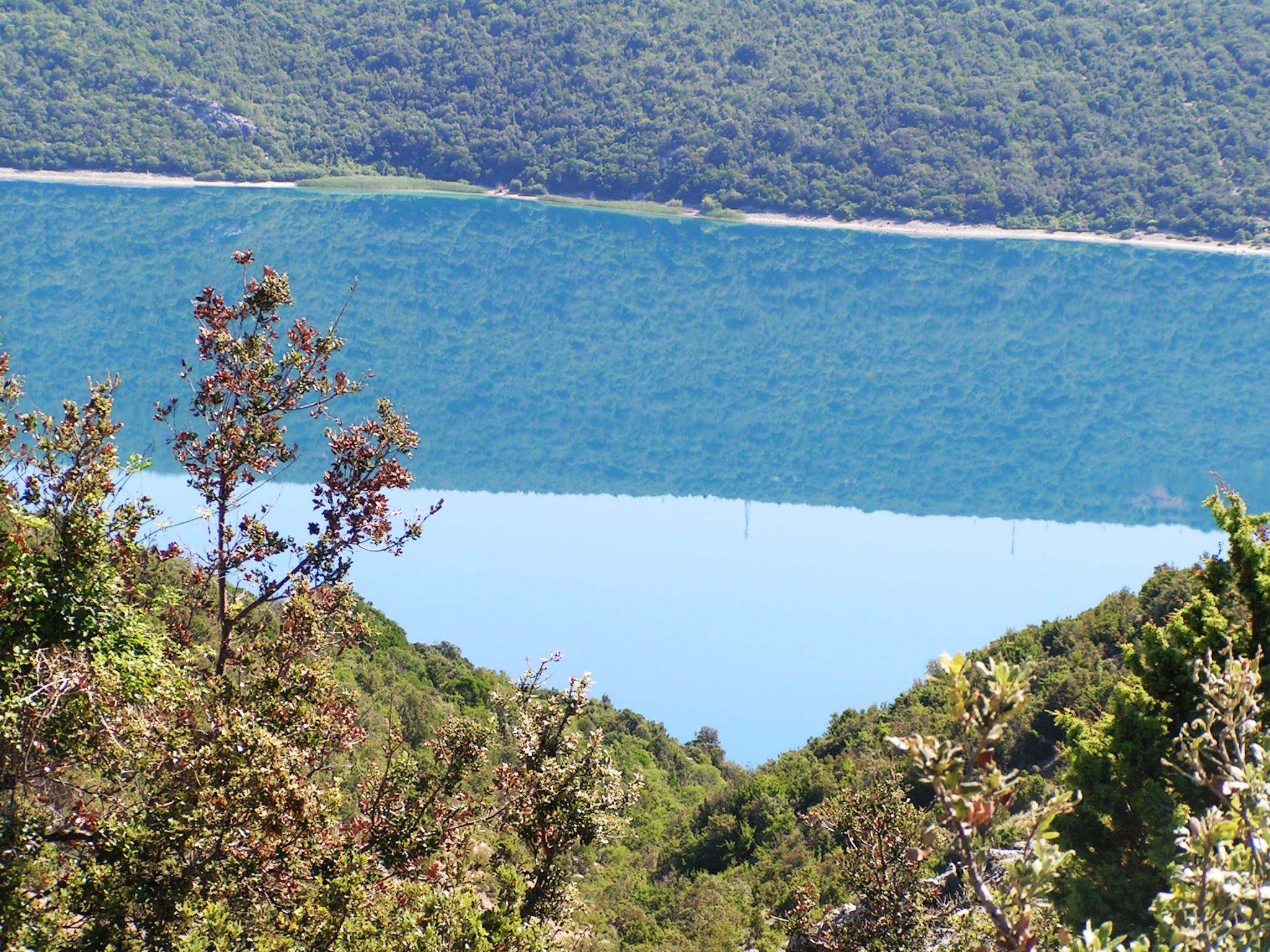
View of Vrana from Mali Podol
