= Vidovići, Croatia =

Village in Primorje-Gorski Kotar, Croatia

Vidovići Vidovici
- Village
- Location within Croatia
- Coordinates: 44.83496°N 14.34951°E
- Country: Croatia
- County: Primorje-Gorski Kotar
- Town: Cres

Area
  - Total: 5.5 km^{2} (2.1 sq mi)

Population (2021)
  - Total: 4
  - Density: 0.73/km^{2} (1.9/sq mi)
- Time zone: UTC+1 (CET)
  - Summer (DST): UTC+2 (CEST)
- Postal code: 51556
- Area code: 051
- Vehicle registration: RI

Vidovići (Italian: Vidovici, Vidovisi) is a village on the Croatian island of Cres, in Primorje-Gorski Kotar. Administratively, it is part of the town of Cres. As of 2021, it had a population of 4. It is located to the north of Martinšćica.
