= Orlec =

Coordinates: 44°53′N 14°25′E

- Village
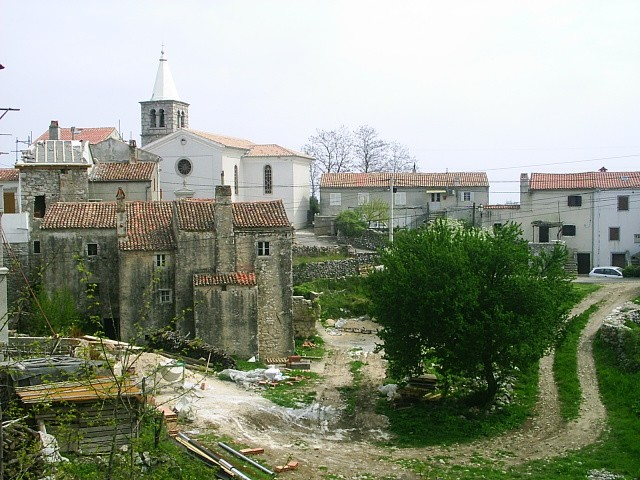
- Street of the village of Orlec on the Cres Island, Croatia
- Interactive map of Orlec
- Country: Croatia

Area
  - Total: 22.6 km^{2} (8.7 sq mi)

Population (2021)
  - Total: 88
  - Density: 3.9/km^{2} (10/sq mi)
- Time zone: UTC+1 (CET)
  - Summer (DST): UTC+2 (CEST)

Orlec (Italian: Aquilonia) is a village on the island of Cres in Croatia. Orlec is near cliffs where the endangered Eurasian griffon vulture (Gyps fulvus) nests.
