= Vidovići, Visoko =

Vidovići Видовићи
- Village
- Location within Bosnia and Herzegovina
- Coordinates: 43.9237919°N 18.2002102°E
- Country: Bosnia and Herzegovina
- Entity: Federation of Bosnia and Herzegovina
- Canton: Zenica-Doboj
- Municipality: Visoko

Area
  - Total: 0.82 sq mi (2.13 km^{2})

Population (2013)
  - Total: 44
  - Density: 54/sq mi (21/km^{2})
- Time zone: UTC+1 (CET)
  - Summer (DST): UTC+2 (CEST)

Vidovići is a village in the municipality of Visoko, Bosnia and Herzegovina.

== Demographics ==
According to the 2013 census, its population was 44, all Bosniaks.
