= Cres =

Island of Croatia

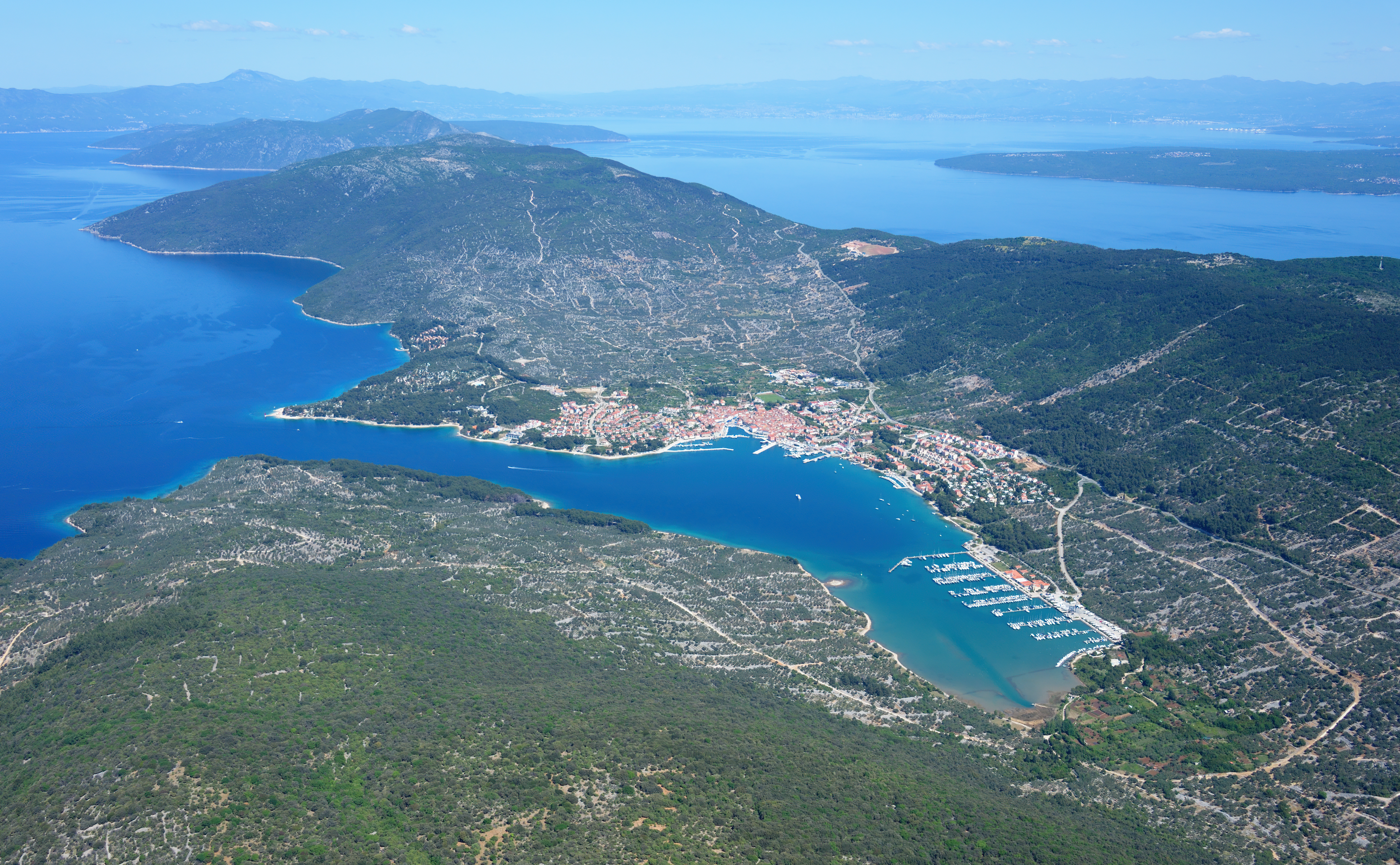
- Aerial view of the northern part of Cres with the town of Cres in the center of the image

- Location within Croatia
- Interactive map of Cres

Geography
- Location: Adriatic Sea
- Coordinates: 44°57′36″N 14°24′29″E
- Area: 405.78 km^{2} (156.67 sq mi)
- Highest elevation: 639 m (2096 ft)
- Highest point: Gorice

Administration
- Croatia
- County: Primorje-Gorski Kotar County
- Largest settlement: Cres (pop. 2289)

Demographics
- Population: 3079 (2011)
- Pop. density: 7.58/km^{2} (19.63/sq mi)

Additional information
- Official website: www.tzg-cres.hr

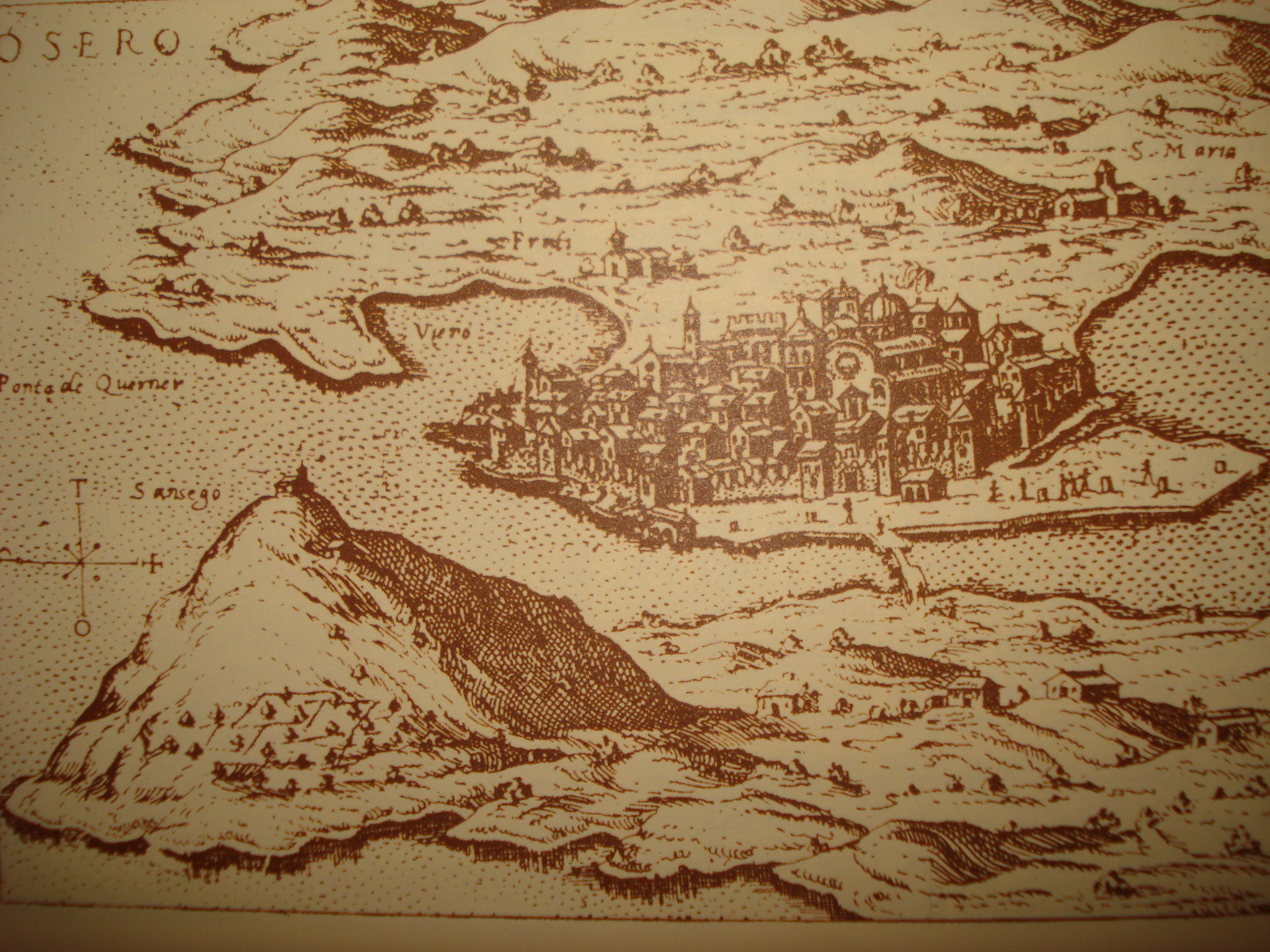
An old depiction of Osor and a part of Cres

Cres (Note: Croatian pronunciation: [t͡srês]; Ancient Greek: Κρέψα, Latin: Crepsa;, Dalmatian: Crepsa, Venetian: Cherso, Italian: Cherso, Greek: Χέρσος) is an Adriatic island in west Croatia. It is one of the northern islands in the Kvarner Gulf and can be reached via ferry from Rijeka, Krk island or from the Istrian peninsula (line Brestova-Porozina).

With an area of 405.78 square kilometres (156.67 mi^{2}), Cres has the same size as the neighbouring Krk island. In 2011, Cres had a population of 3,079 people.

In Earths earlier history, Cres and the neighbouring island of Lošinj used to be one island, but now they are divided by a channel and connected by a bridge that starts from the town of Osor. Cres's only freshwater source is Lake Vrana.

== History ==
Cres has been inhabited since the Paleolithic time period. In ancient times, Cres and Lošinj were called Apsyrtides. In the past, the two islands were connected, but due to the needs of trade, these islands were separated by an artificially dug canal near Osor. Its name predates classical antiquity and derives from Proto-Indo-European *(s)quer- ("cliff"). When the town was founded and inhabited by ancient Greeks, it was called Chersos (Χέρσος), which in Greek means "barren land", "uncultivated land" or "dry heaths". Later, "Chersos" was resounded to "Cresta", from which eventually the modern name "Cherso-Cres" came.

Cres was ruled by the Greeks until the first century B.C., when the Roman Empire made the island part of the province of Liburnia. After the fall of the Roman Empire the island became part of the Byzantine Empire as one of the Dalmatian city-states, and remained this way for centuries. Slavs first arrived on the island in the early 9th century (believed to be somewhere around 812).

Around 866, the inhabitants saw their first conflicts with the Republic of Venice. The Venetians eventually took control of Cres and the neighboring islands during the 10th and 11th centuries.

After Napoleon's victory over the Venetians, the control of the island was given to the Austrian Empire. After the defeat of Austria by Napoleon in 1809, the island became part of the French Empire.

After the fall of Napoleon, Austria took control of the island once again and kept it for a century. During this time the economy developed, thanks to the olive trees, sage, and other plants becoming a key part to the success of the island. At the end of World War I, with the Treaty of Rapallo signed in 1920, the island was handed over to the Kingdom of Italy.

Italian rule over the island did not last long. Because of Italy alliance with the Axis powers during World War II, Cres was handed over to Yugoslavia in 1947 along with neighbouring islands and the Istrian Peninsula.

The island has gone through an agricultural downturn as many residents left the island for the mainland or abroad. This has resulted in many former agricultural areas becoming overgrown with local vegetation. Recently, people, primarily retirees, have been returning to live on the island. Tourism has become an increasingly important industry and the population experiences significant seasonal variation.

== Towns of Cres ==
The island has several villages, all of them connected by a road that runs down the middle of the island. On one side is the ferry from Porozina to Brestova (in Istria). Another ferry runs from Merag to Valbiska (on the neighbouring island of Krk); on the other is the bridge to Lošinj, which was once connected by land, but is now separated by a waterway.

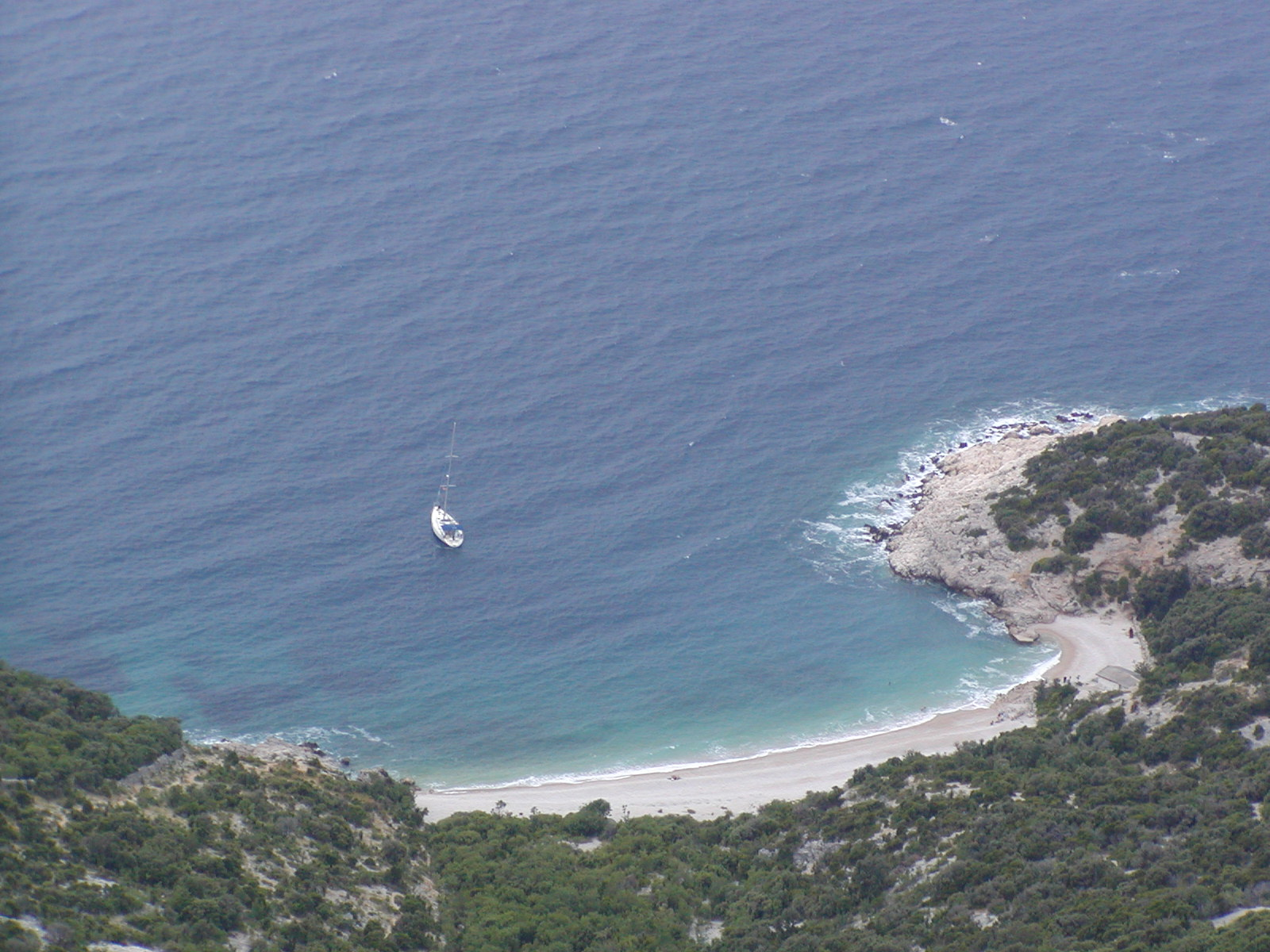
Lubenice Beach.

A list of the villages with descriptions is below:

- Belej
- Beli – This small village, at the end of a long and very narrow road, is home to a famed bird species, the endangered Griffon vulture.
- Cres
- Lubenice – An ancient mountain village with a great view of the sea and neighboring islands. A restaurant and bar operate during the warmer months. Weekly musical concerts take place during the peak tourist season.
- Martinšćica – The home of a large vacation complex, Slatina, along with beaches and cafes. It also has an essential oils distillery. The town also has a small castle, known as "Kastel", which was once inhabited by a "Sforza" family of Italian nobility (apparently unrelated to the famous Milanese house) and by Napoleonic Imperial forces, before becoming a restaurant which recently closed.
- Merag - with ferry connections.
- Miholašćica – A small village with a church which shares the same name as the community. Tourism has grown here since the arrival of the Zaglav community nearby.
- Orlec – Another small village at the end of a narrow road, also home to the endangered vulture.
- Osor – A town on the "border" between two islands. Founded by the Romans who also dug the channel thus dividing what was then known as the Osor island into Cres and Lošinj. Then a major port and commercial centre started to fade with coming of larger ships that could not pass the narrow channel or dock in the shallow port.
- Pernat – The westernmost village on Cape Pernat. A quaint and rustic village forming a gateway to numerous walking trails and secluded beaches.
- Mali Podol – Between Lubenice and Valun. A tiny hamlet that resembles a large farmhouse. Its key feature is the mulberry tree located in the middle of the road.
- Porozina – A small village comprising the ferry terminal and a few shops.
- Punta Križa – The southernmost part of Cres. FKK resort is here.

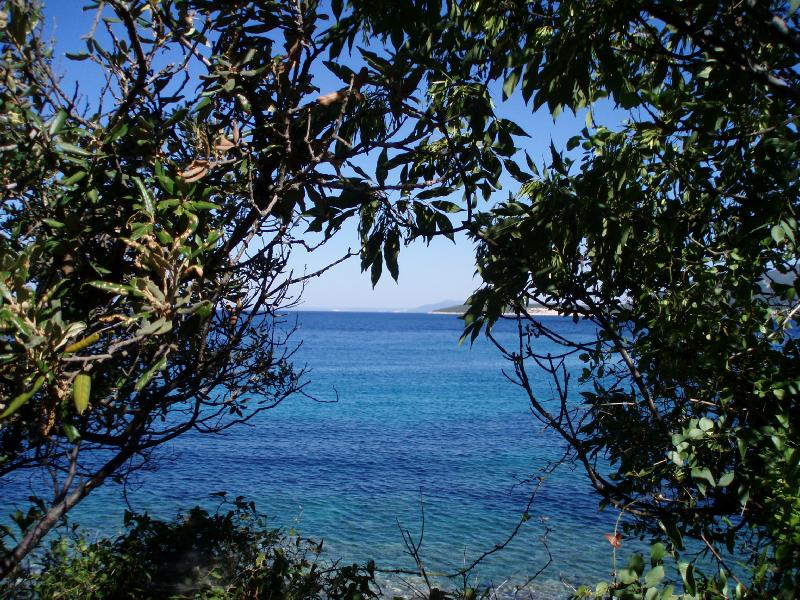
Stivan Beach

- Stivan – On a side street this small hamlet of 16 people features a very private beach, old houses and a church, and is on the way to other villages.
- Valun – Visible on the way to Lubenice (see below), this village does not permit cars. A fee is charged for parking.
- Vidovići – A short distance uphill from Martinšćica. A village with an extraordinary view of the Istrian Peninsula and numerous islands including Zeča, Lošinj, and Unije forming part of the archipelago. A restaurant "Mali Raj" once operated in the evenings during the warmer months.

== Lake Vrana ==
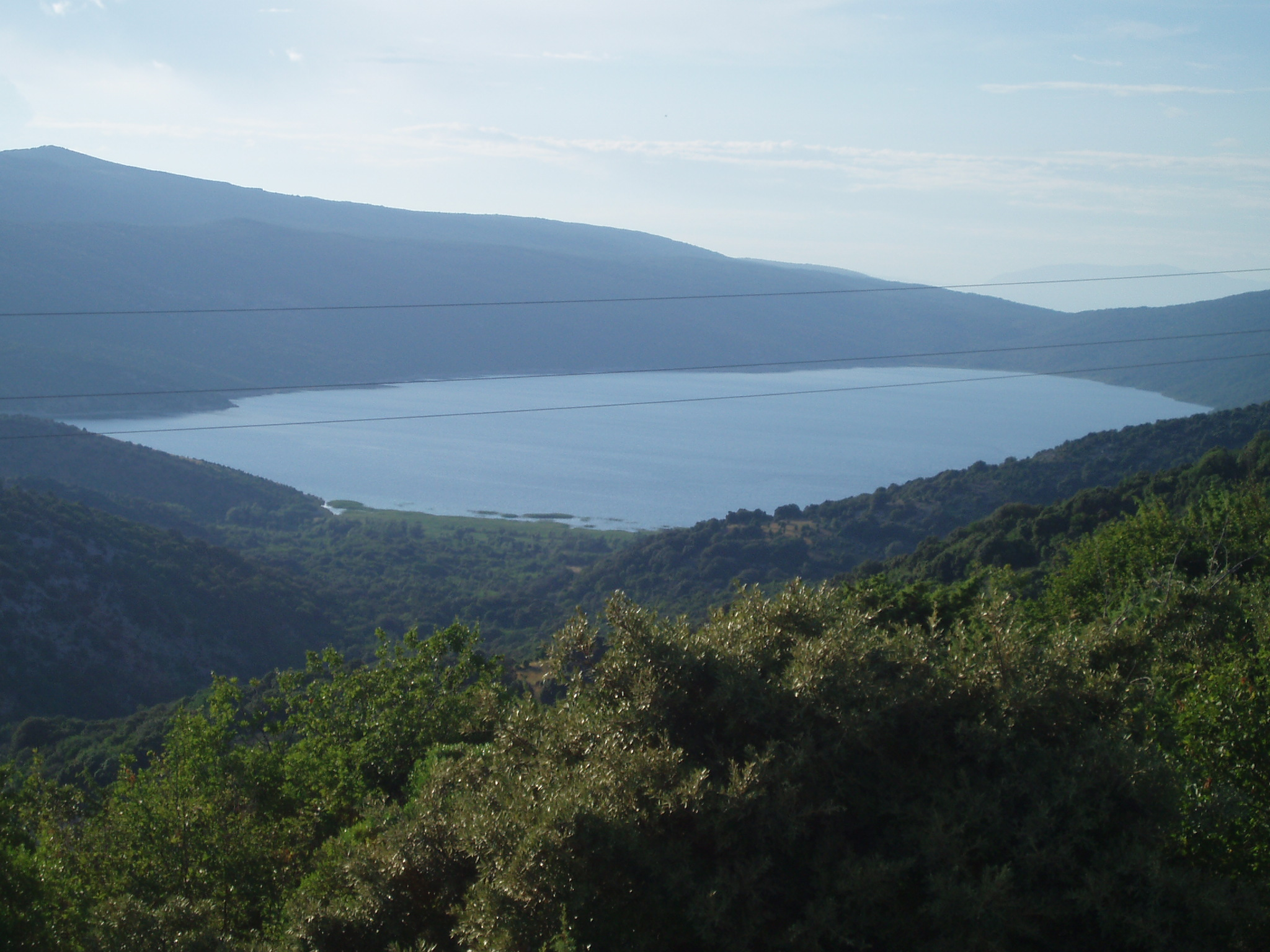
Lake Vrana.

Cres has its own fresh water lake, which is very highly guarded and illegal to swim or fish in. It supplies water to neighboring Lošinj as well. It is the largest lake in Croatia by volume and one of the deepest fresh water lakes in Eastern Europe, going down 76 metres (249 ft) at its deepest point (>50 metres (160 ft) below sea-level).

== Flora and fauna ==
Cres is home to many different types of nonvenomous snakes, including Elaphe quatuorlineata, Zamenis longissimus, Zamenis situla, and Natrix tessellata, a snake rare or absent on other Adriatic islands.

=== Birds ===
The island has a relatively large breeding population of the endangered Eurasian griffon vulture, which can often be seen soaring over the island. It forms part of the Kvarner Islands Important Bird Area (IBA), designated as such by BirdLife International because it supports significant numbers of many bird species, including breeding populations of many birds of prey.

== Climate ==
The main part of Cres features a mid-latitude humid subtropical climate (Köppen : Cfa) under the Köppen climate classification. Winters are cool and damp, punctuated by the Bora wind and summers are hot and quite dry, bordering on a hot-summer mediterranean climate (Csa). Further south, Lošinj island enjoys a true hot-summer mediterranean climate (Csa) with cool and damp winters and hot, distinctly dry summers.

== See also ==
- List of islands in the Adriatic
- Lake Vrana

== Bibliography ==
=== Name ===
- Šenoa, Milan (1949). "Prilog poznavanju starih naziva naših otoka" [A Contribution to Learning the Old Names of Our Islands]. Hrvatski geografski glasnik (in Serbo-Croatian) (11–12) (published 15 June 1950): 75–82. ISSN 1331-5854.

=== General ===
- Luigi Tomaz, La Magnifica Comunità di Cherso, Foreword by Arnaldo Mauri, Conselve 2010.

=== Alpinism ===
- "Auf Cherso" [On Cherso]. Mitteilungen des Deutschen und Österreichischen Alpenvereins (in German). 16 (12): 156–159. 1890.

=== Geography ===
- Slukan Altić, Mirela (2000). Stari zemljovidi otoka Cresa [Old Maps of the Island of Cres] (in Croatian). Rijeka: Centar za održivi razvoj Ekopark Pernat. ISBN 953-6852-02-0.

=== History ===
- Luigi Tomaz, Ossero e Cherso nei secoli prima di Venezia, Foreword by P. Antonio Bonmarco patriarch of Aquileia, Conselve 2002.
- Arnaldo Mauri, The economic and social life in the community of Cherso (Cres) through the centuries: a foreword, SSRN

=== Toponymy ===
- Šimunović, Petar (March 2013). "Predantički toponimi u današnjoj (i povijesnoj) Hrvatskoj" [Pre-Roman placenames in present-day (and historical) Croatia] (PDF). Folia onomastica Croatica (in Croatian) (22). Zagreb: Croatian Academy of Sciences and Arts: 147–214.

=== Tourism ===
- Grofelnik, Hrvoje (2017). "Lokalni plavi vodni otisak turizma na otocima Cresu i Lošinju" [The local blue water footprint of tourism on the islands of Cres and Lošinj]. Hrvatski geografski glasnik (in English and Croatian). 79 (2): 27–50. doi:10.21861/HGG.2017.79.02.02.
- "Cres and Losinj: Strolling through the islands and islets" Nadir Mavrovic, Nerezine 1997. Televrina d.o.o. Nerezine
