= Stivan =

Village in Primorje-Gorski Kotar, Croatia

Stivan San Giovanni
- Village
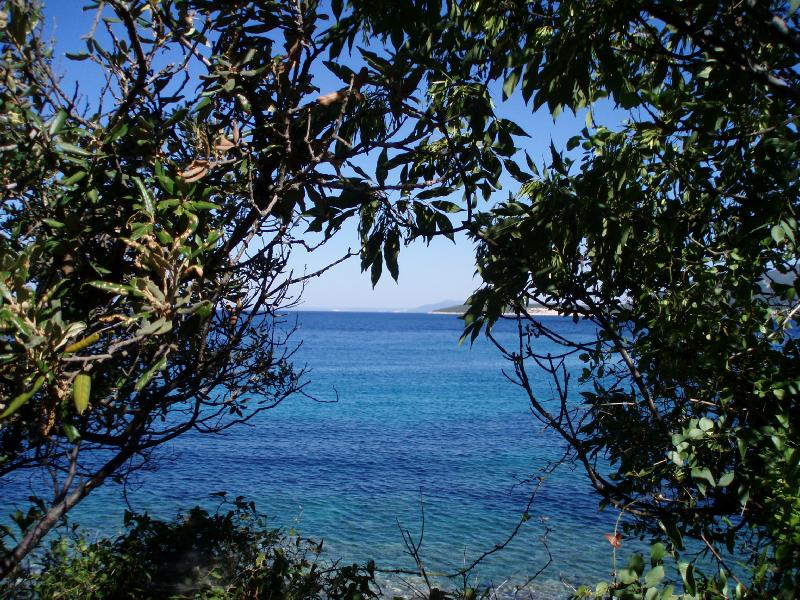
- View from Stivan

- Location within Croatia
- Coordinates: 44.79043°N 14.38142°E
- Country: Croatia
- County: Primorje-Gorski Kotar
- Town: Cres

Area
  - Total: 23.5 km^{2} (9.1 sq mi)

Population (2021)
  - Total: 24
  - Density: 1.0/km^{2} (2.6/sq mi)
- Time zone: UTC+1 (CET)
  - Summer (DST): UTC+2 (CEST)
- Postal code: 51556
- Area code: 051
- Vehicle registration: RI

Stivan (Italian: San Giovanni, Stivano) is a village on the Croatian island of Cres, in Primorje-Gorski Kotar. Administratively, it is part of the town of Cres. As of 2021, it had a population of 24. A church devoted to St. John the Baptist (Croatian: Crkva sv. Ivan Krstitelj) is situated in the village.
