= Beli, Croatia =

Beli
- Village
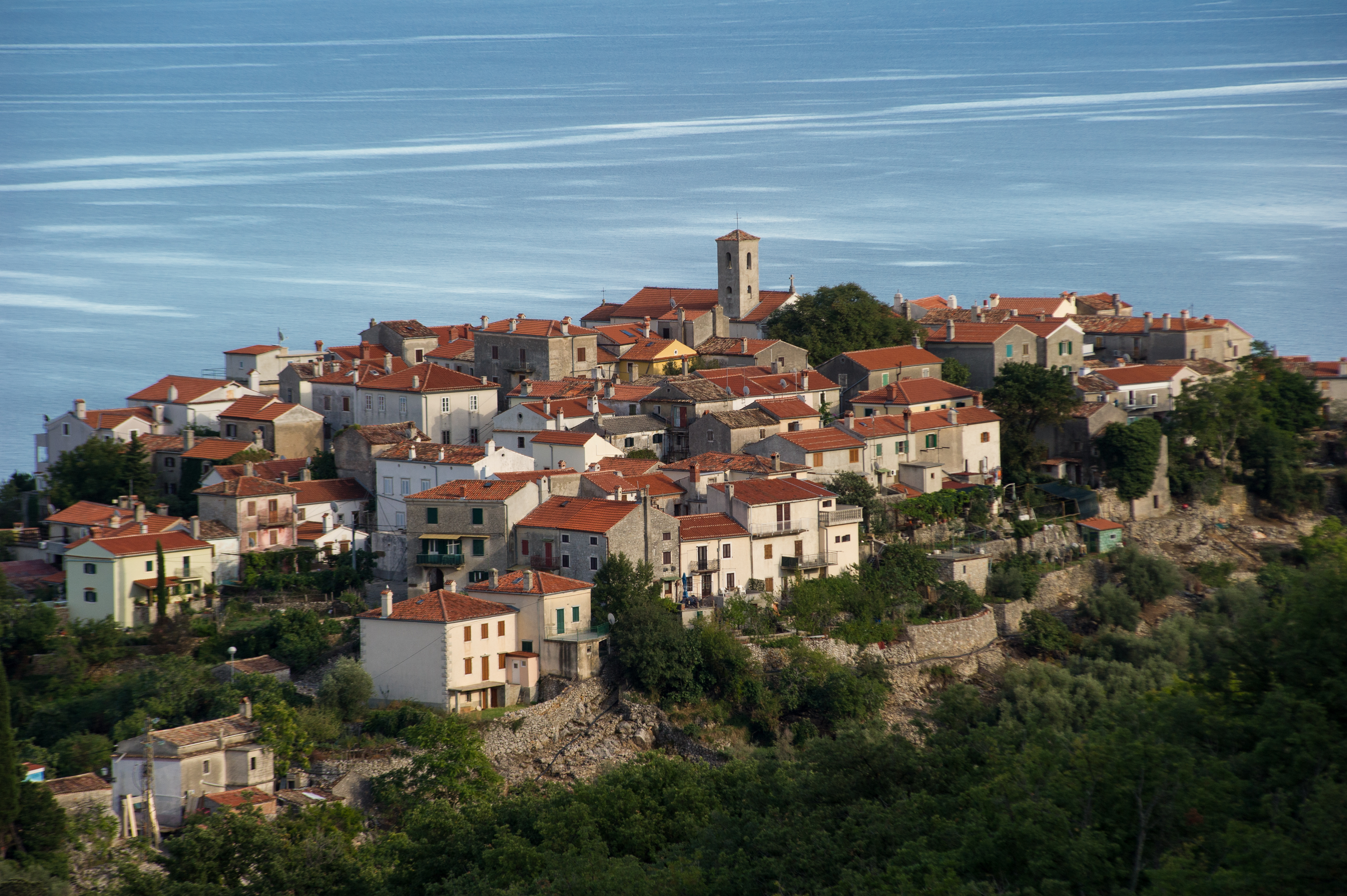
- Interactive map of Beli
- Coordinates: 45°07′N 14°21′E
- Country: Croatia
- County: Primorje-Gorski Kotar
- Municipality: Cres

Area
  - Total: 2.0 sq mi (5.1 km^{2})
- Elevation: 371 ft (113 m)

Population (2021)
  - Total: 54
  - Density: 27/sq mi (11/km^{2})
- Time zone: UTC+1 (CET)
  - Summer (DST): UTC+2 (CEST)
- Postal code: 51559
- Area code: +385 (0)51

Beli is a village in Croatia. It is located on the island of Cres.

== Architecture ==
The Sv. Prikazanja Gospodinova church (45.1104°N 14.3553°E), dedicated to the Presentation of the Lord, serves as the parish church. It was built on the site of an older Romanesque church, dated to the beginning of the 12th century. The final adaptation of the nave of the new church took place in the 18th century.

A church dedicated to Saint Mary (45.1102°N 14.3552°E) is on the square opposite the parish church.

The Sv. Antuna opata cemetery church (45.1119°N 14.3540°E), dedicated to Saint Anthony the Great, is to the north of the old town. It is a 16th century Gothic built for the local confraternity, which renovated it in 1584. There are no traces of frescoes.

A church dedicated to Saint John the Baptist (45.10775°N 14.3382°E) is at the edge of a polje on the mountain above Beli.

== History ==
There are traces of a 9th/10th century church in the stones of the town lodge.

In 1584, the local Saint Anthony confraternity renovated their Sv. Antuna opata church, as recorded in the confraternity's Glagolitic register

== Gallery ==
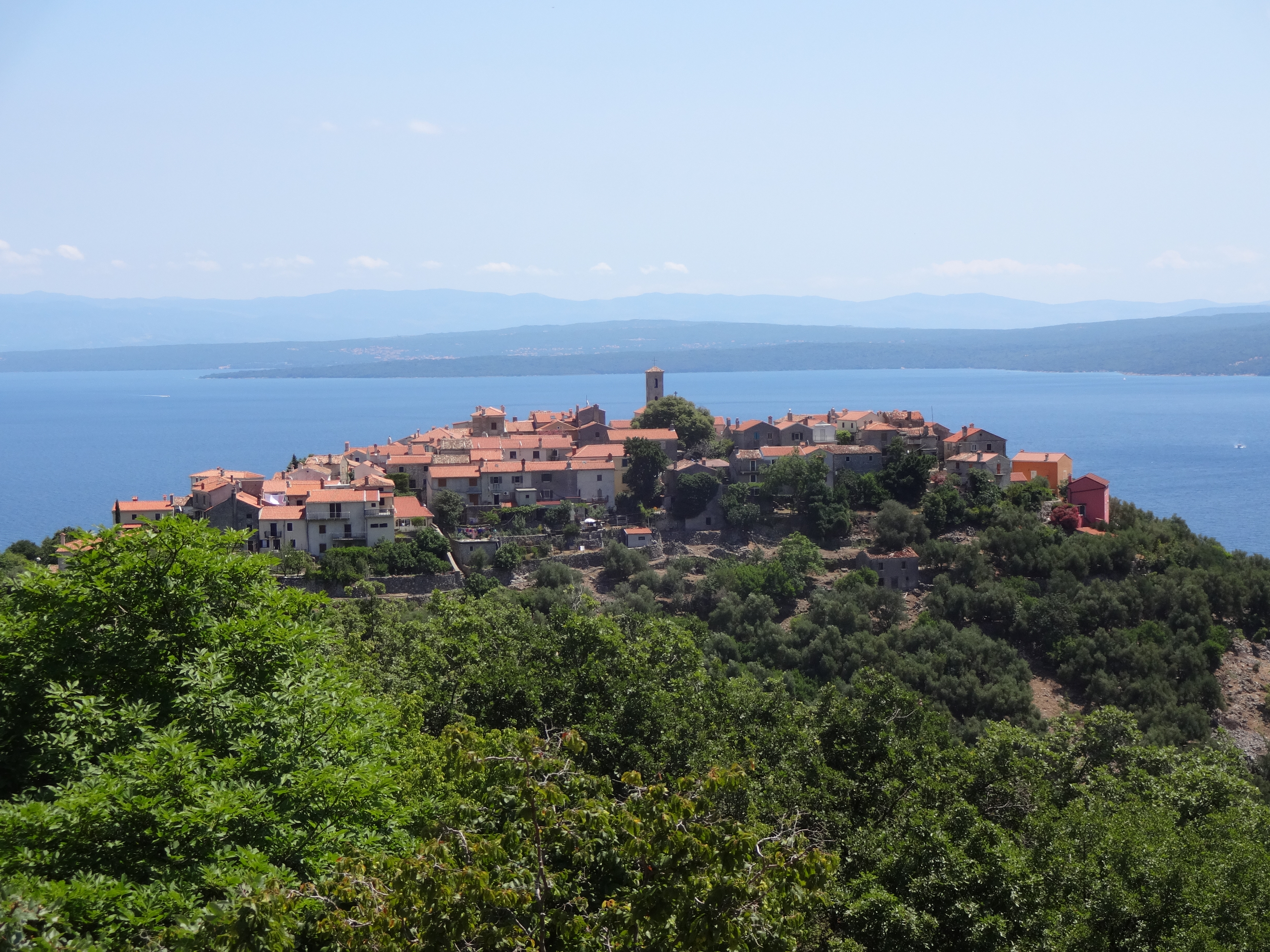
Skyline (daytime)

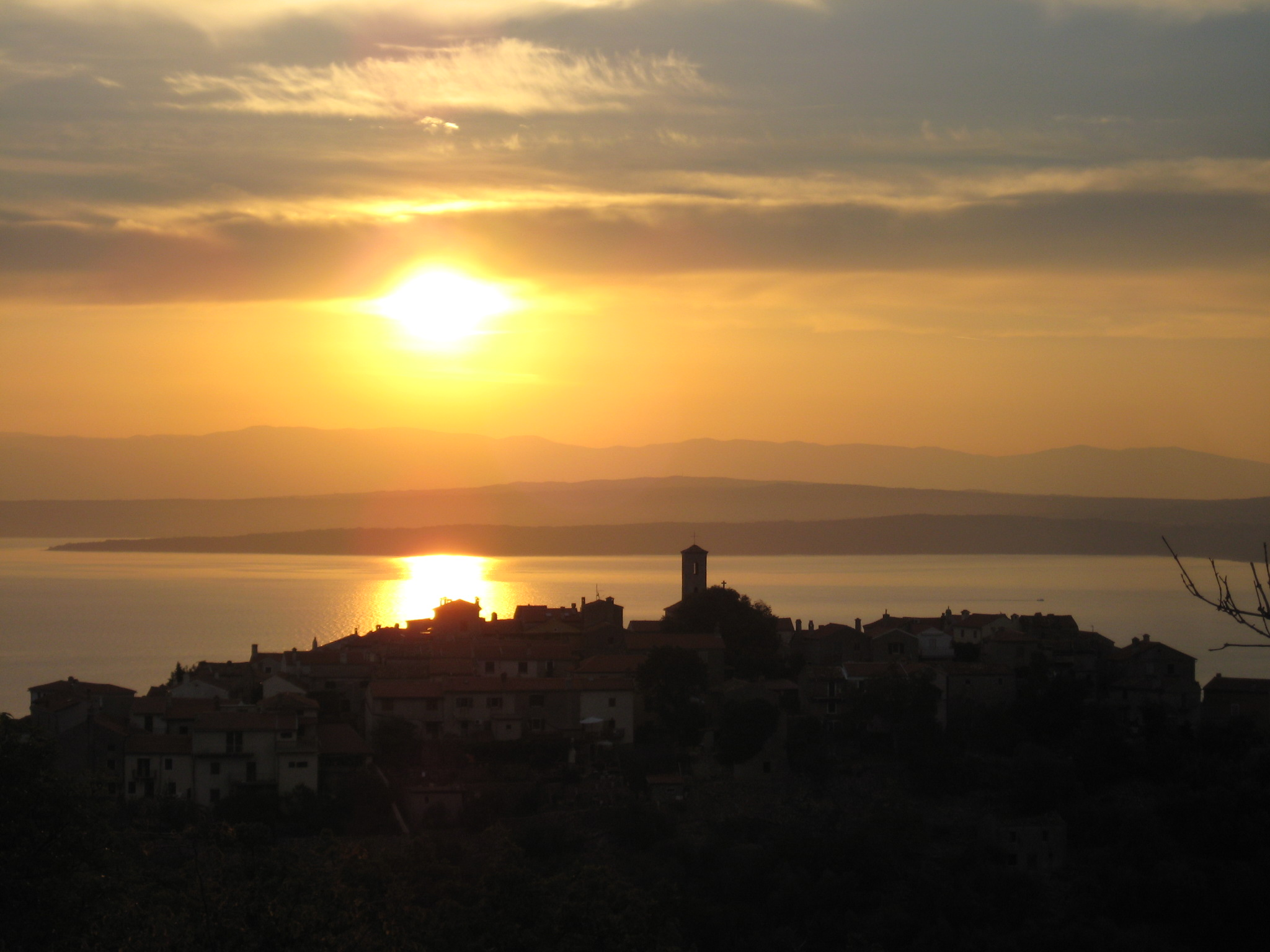
Skyline (sunrise)

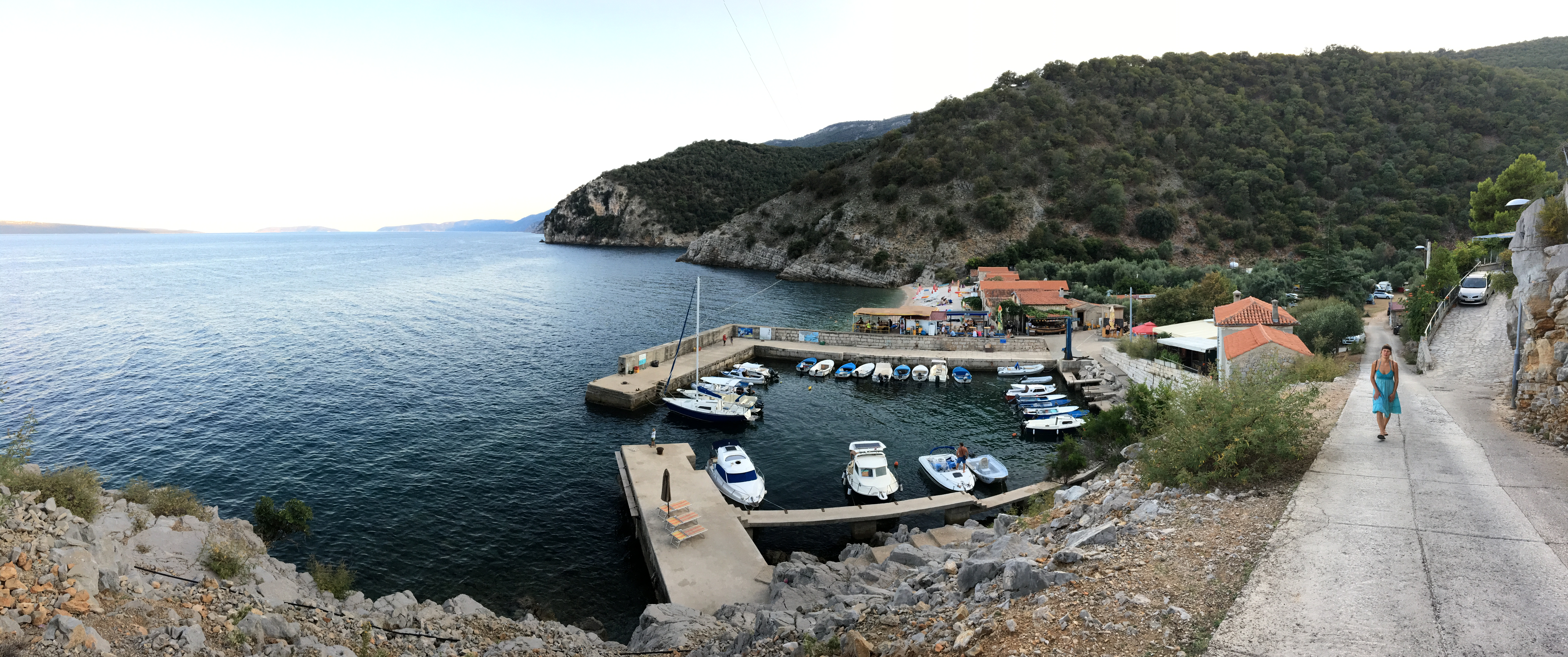
Port

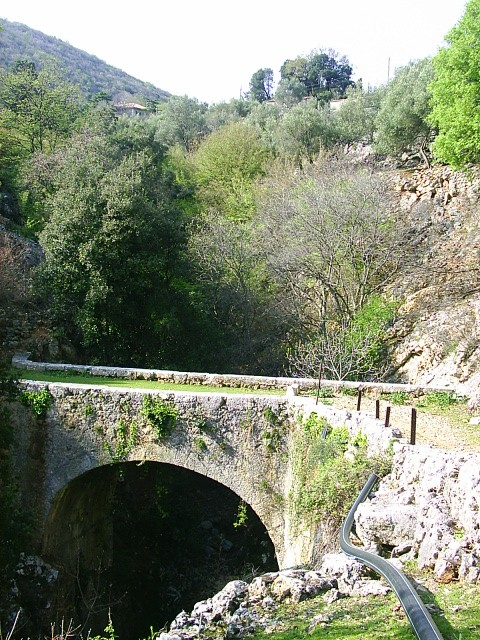
Bridge

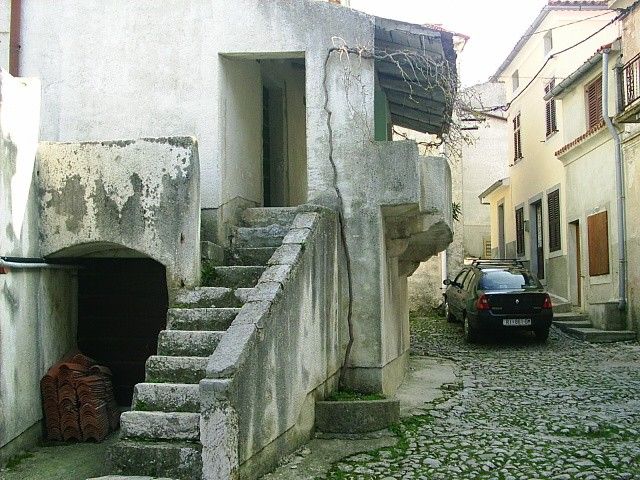
Early 19th century house

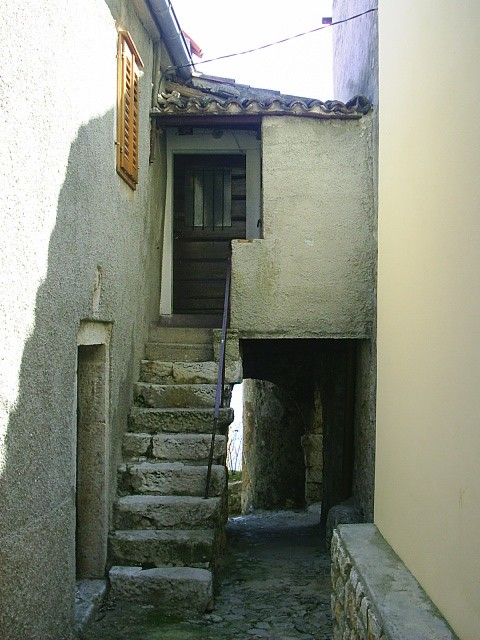
Skybridge entryway

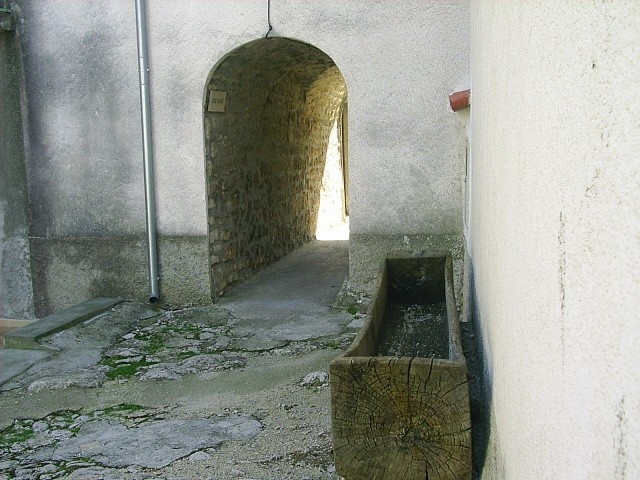
Passage

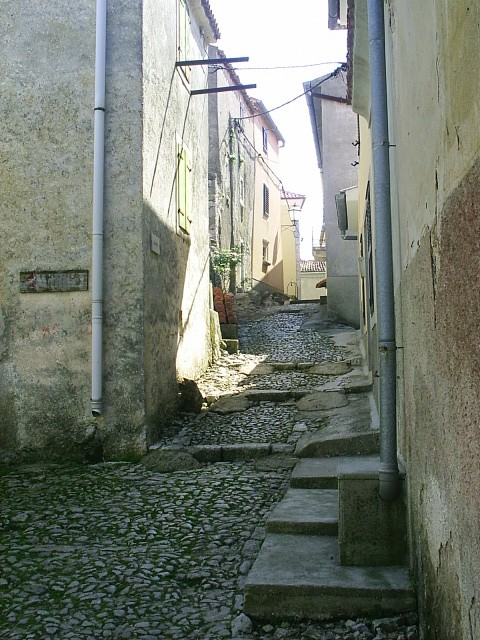
Stepped street

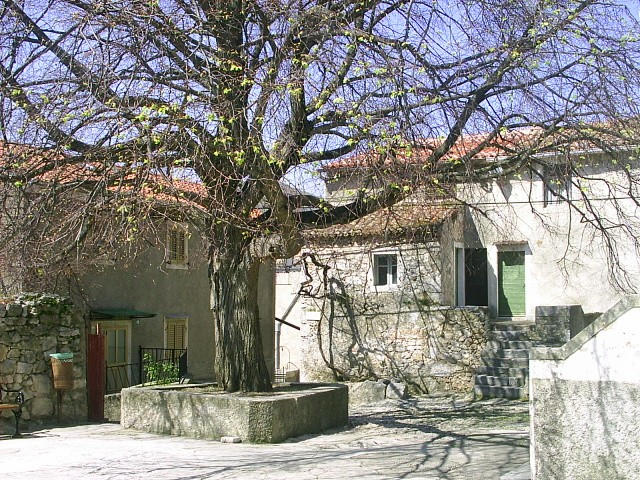
Tree skirt

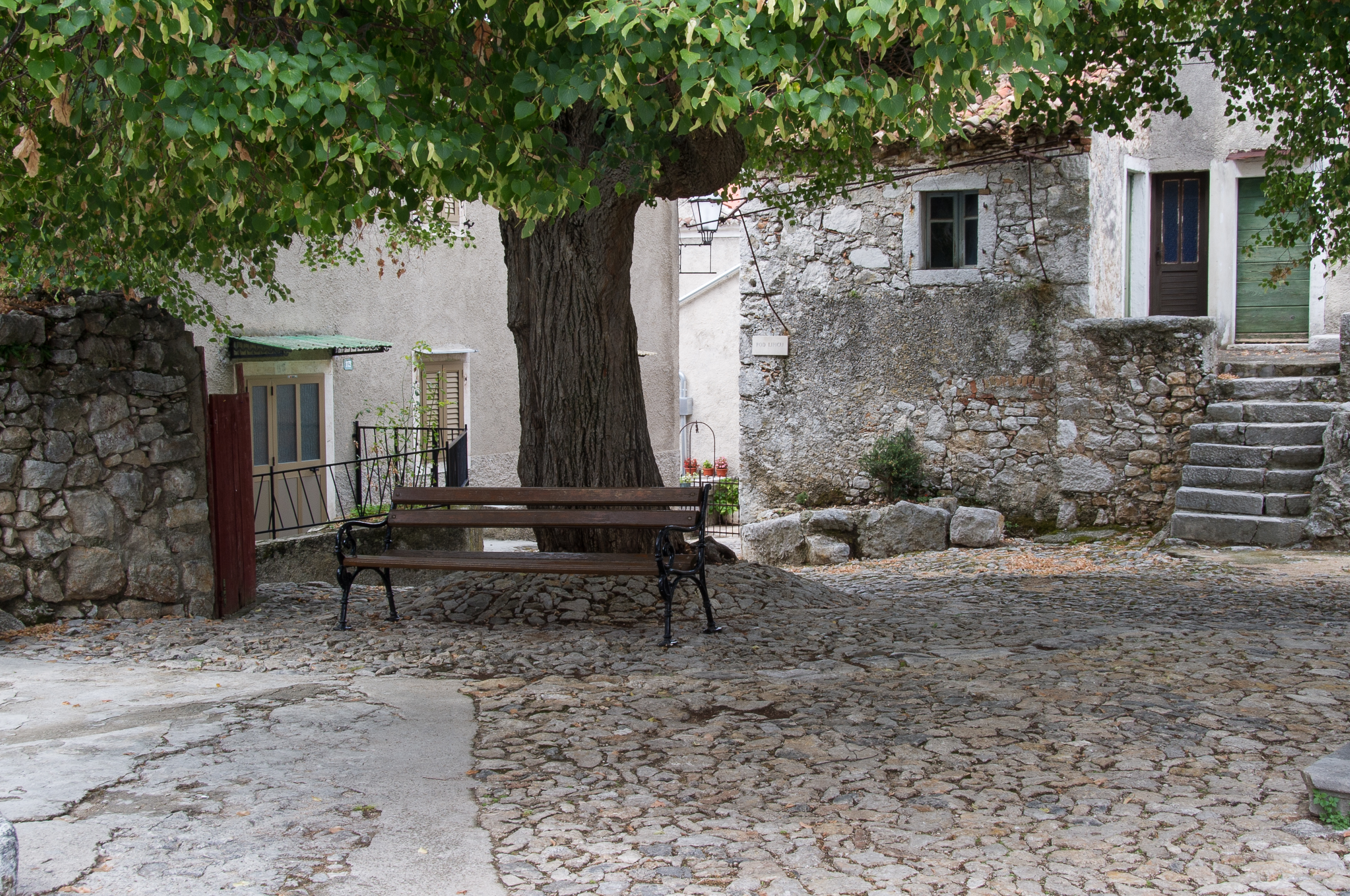
Linden tree
