= Martinšćica =

Village in Primorje-Gorski Kotar, Croatia

Martinšćica San Martino di Cherso
- Village
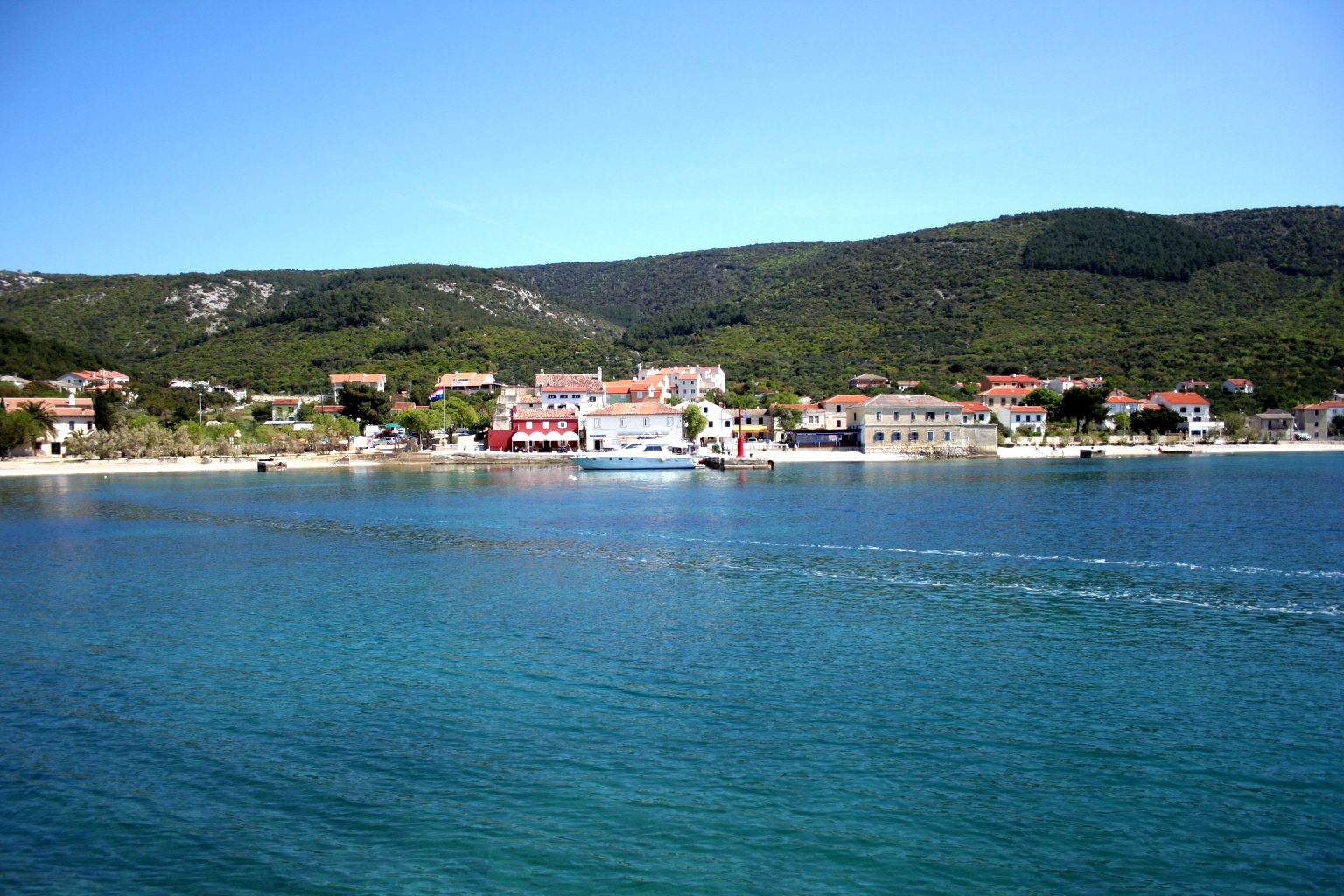
- View of Martinšćica

- Location within Croatia
- Coordinates: 44.81943°N 14.35158°E
- Country: Croatia
- County: Primorje-Gorski Kotar
- Town: Cres

Area
  - Total: 10.0 km^{2} (3.9 sq mi)

Population (2021)
  - Total: 103
  - Density: 10.3/km^{2} (26.7/sq mi)
- Time zone: UTC+1 (CET)
  - Summer (DST): UTC+2 (CEST)
- Postal code: 51556
- Area code: 051
- Vehicle registration: RI

Martinšćica (Italian: San Martino di Cherso, San Martino in Valle) is a coastal village on the Croatian island of Cres, in Primorje-Gorski Kotar. Administratively, it is part of the town of Cres. As of 2021, it had a population of 103. With a marina providing direct access to the Adriatic Sea, Martinšćica is a popular tourist destination with many tourist facilities.

== Gallery ==
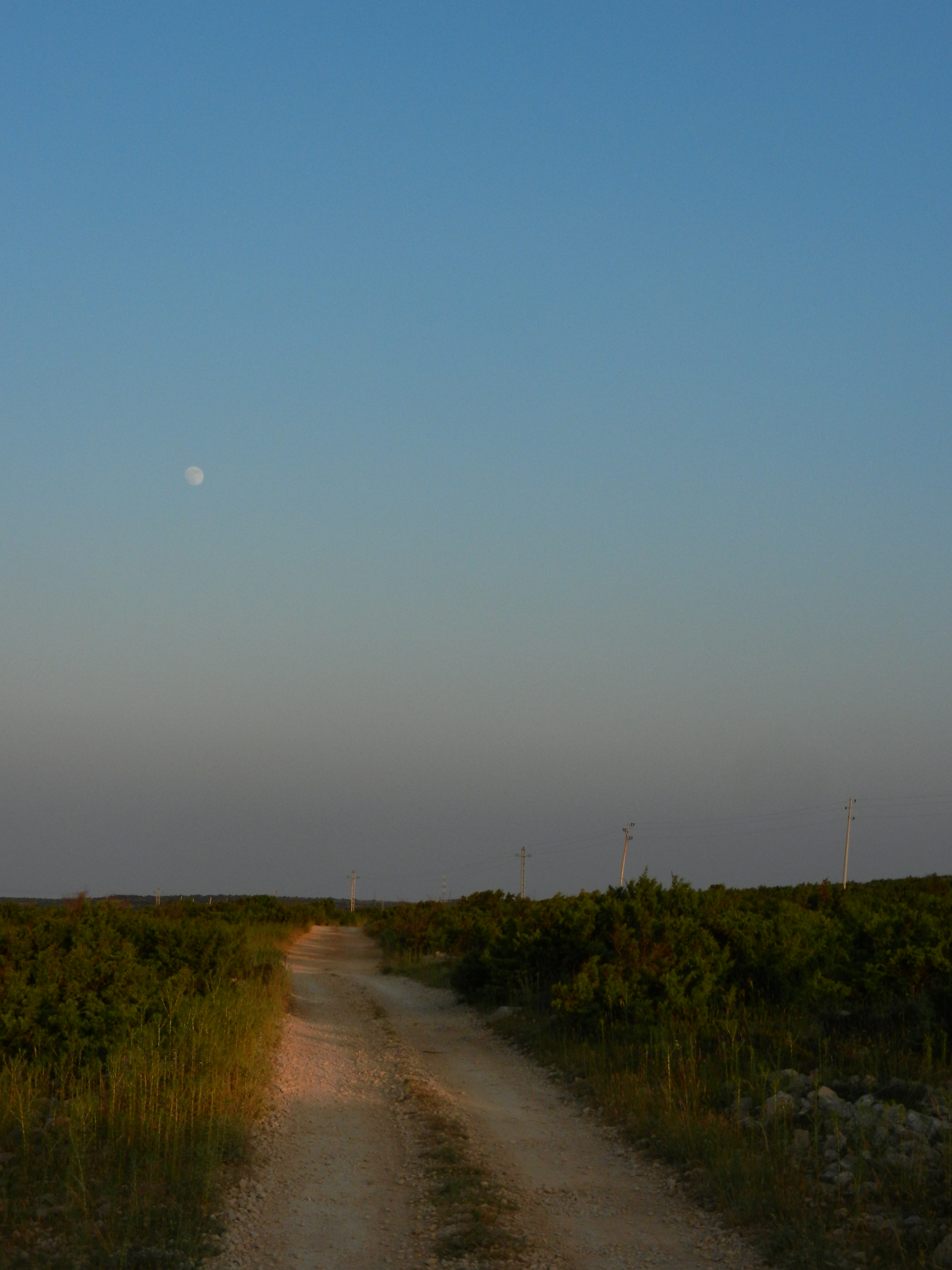
Gravel road
