= Lake Vrana (Cres) =

- Vransko jezero (Croatian)
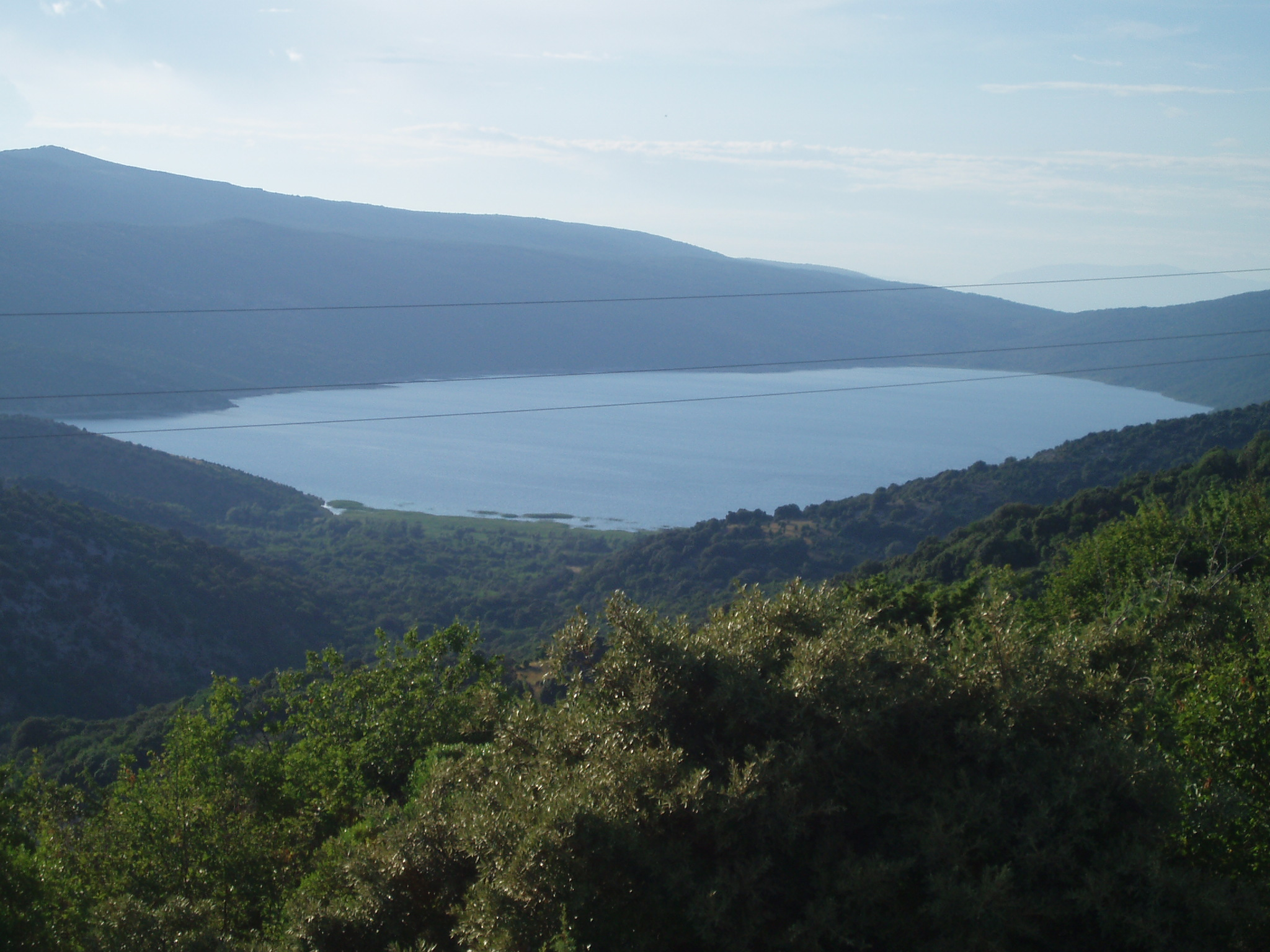
- Lake Vrana on the island of Cres.

- Location within Croatia
- Interactive map of Lake Vrana
- Location: Croatia
- Coordinates: 44°51′N 14°23′E
- Type: lake
- Max. length: 4.8 kilometres (3.0 mi)
- Max. width: 1.5 kilometres (0.93 mi)
- Surface area: 5.8 square kilometres (2.2 sq mi)
- Max. depth: 74 metres (243 ft)
- Water volume: 220,000,000 cubic metres (7.8×10^{9} cu ft)

Lake Vrana (Croatian: Vransko jezero), in the centre of Cres island, is a fresh water lake, 1.5 kilometres (0.93 mi) wide and about 4.8 kilometres (3.0 mi) long. The town of Cres has been supplied with drinking water from the lake since 1953, and the towns of Mali and Veli Lošinj received their supplies ten years later. It was thought at one time that the water in the lake was linked to some mainland source by underground streams, but it has since been established that in fact it originates from the atmosphere.

== Description ==
The lake is one of cryptodepression characteristics. It was formed by very heavy tectonic movements along a longitudinal relaxation fault which now contains 220,000,000 cubic metres (7.8×10^{9} cu ft) of fresh water. Comprising an area of 5.8 square kilometres (2.2 sq mi), the depression reaches a depth of around 60 metres (200 ft) below the sea level, but its surface lies about 14 metres (46 ft) above it, oscillating by about half a metre, meaning the maximum depth is 74 metres (243 ft). It is surrounded by mountains like the 483 metres (1,585 ft) high Mount Elmo and Mount Perskra of 429 metres (1,407 ft).

The village of Vrana, above the lake, is located 15 kilometres (9.3 mi) south of the town of Cres.

The lake contains pike, tench and carp. There are also eels, but their origin is still unclear.

== Myth of Lake Vrana ==
There is a local legend that there is a castle under the lake. According to the legend, a rich sister who lived in the castle would not give her much poorer sister money or food. As a result, she was punished by having her castle flooded during a severe thunderstorm which caused Lake Vrana to be created. The story goes on to tell that on some windy days, if one is to listen very carefully the tower bells can still be heard ringing to this day.

== Gallery ==
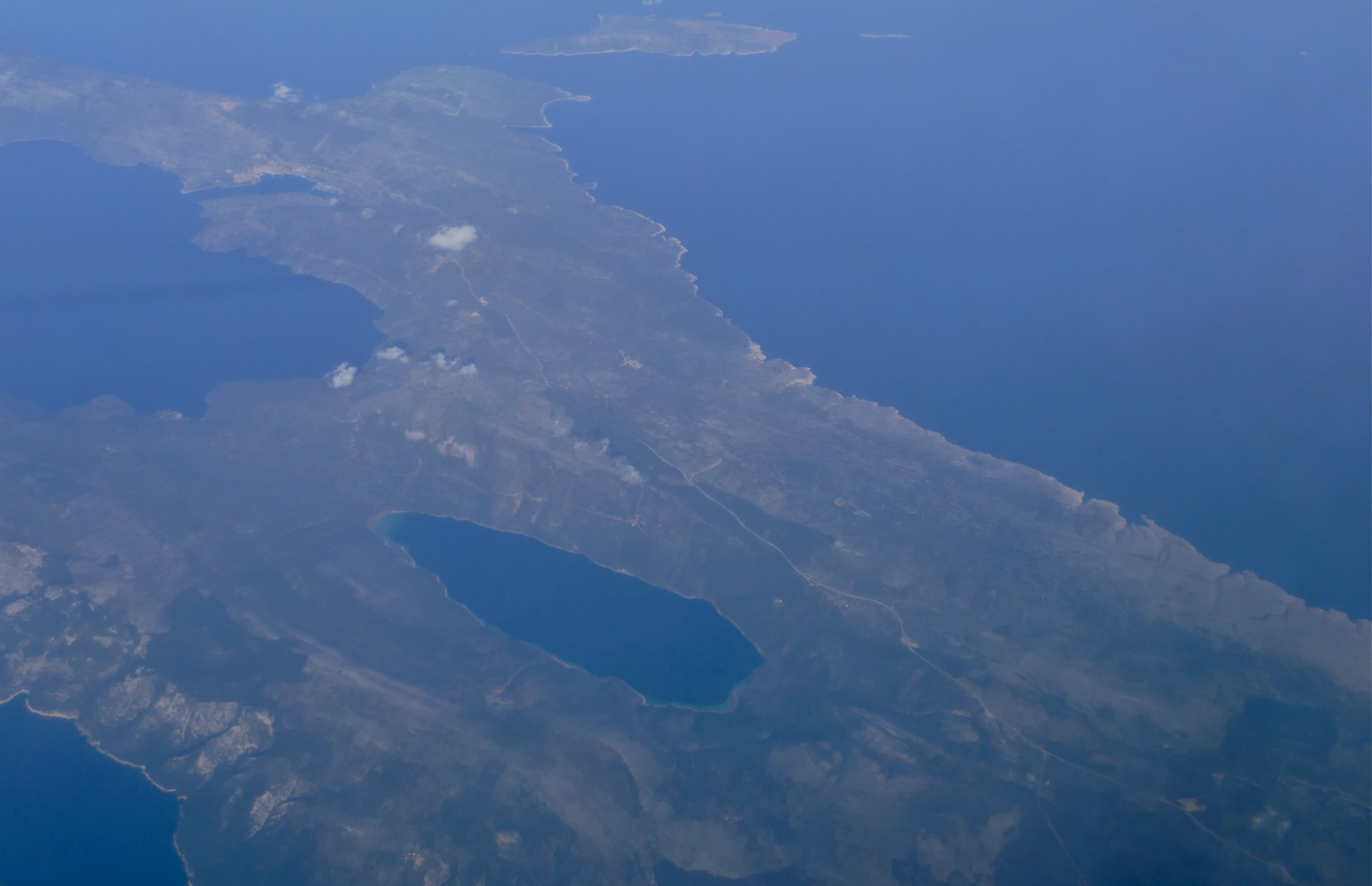
Satellite view

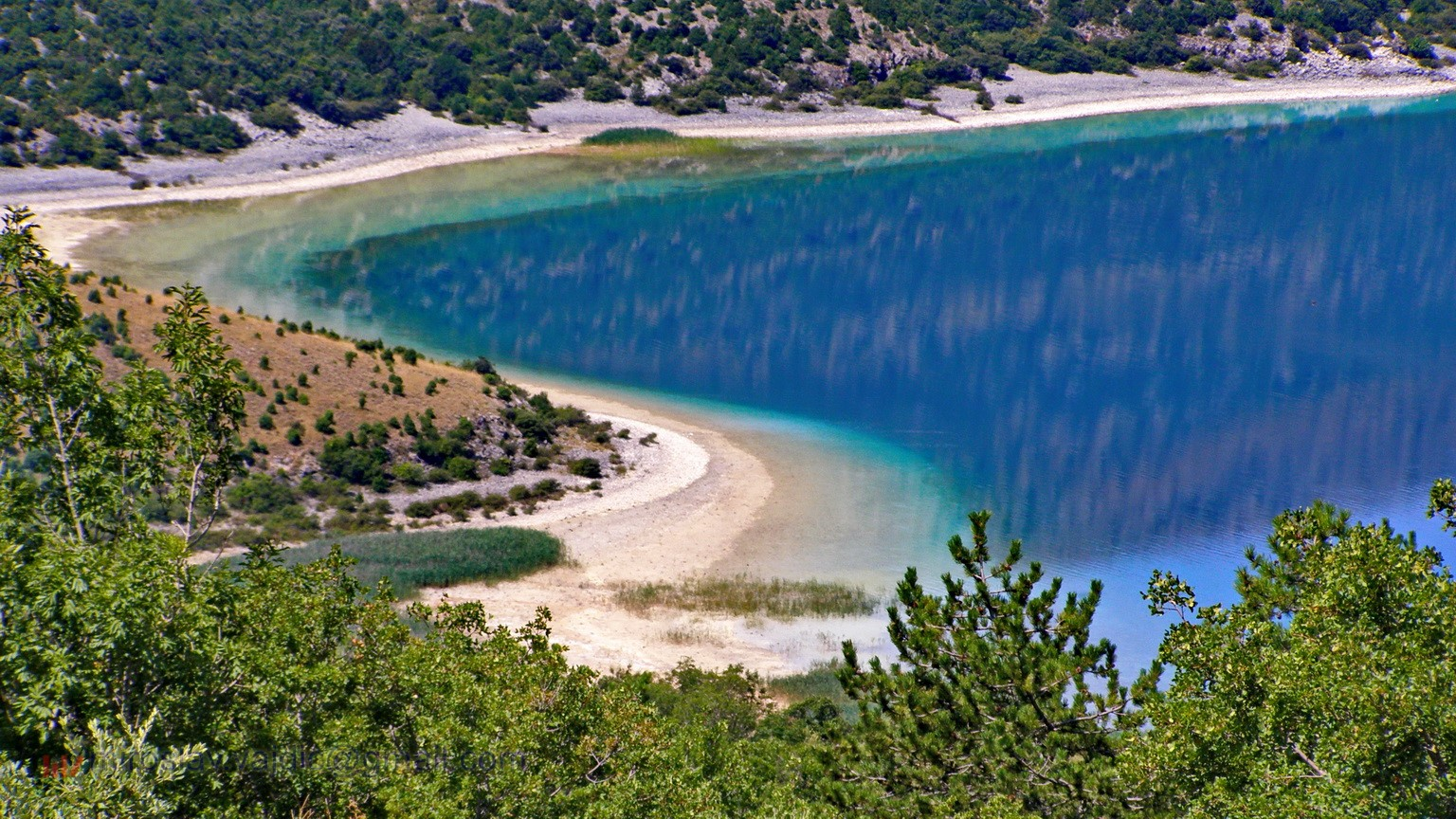
Southern shore

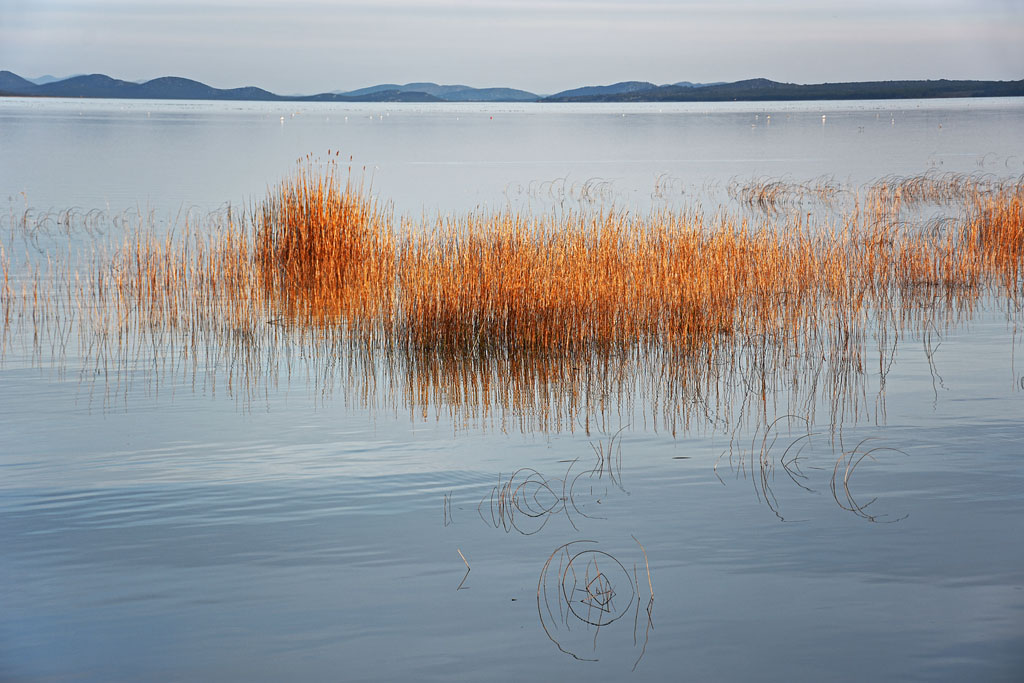
Rushes
