= D100 road =

Road in Croatia

D100 state road

Route information
- Length: 81.0 km (50.3 mi)

Major junctions
- From: Porozina ferry port, island of Cres (ferry link to the mainland)
- D101 to Merag ferry port (ferry link to island of Krk)
- To: Mali Lošinj

Location
- Country: Croatia
- Counties: Primorje-Gorski Kotar

Highway system
- Highways in Croatia

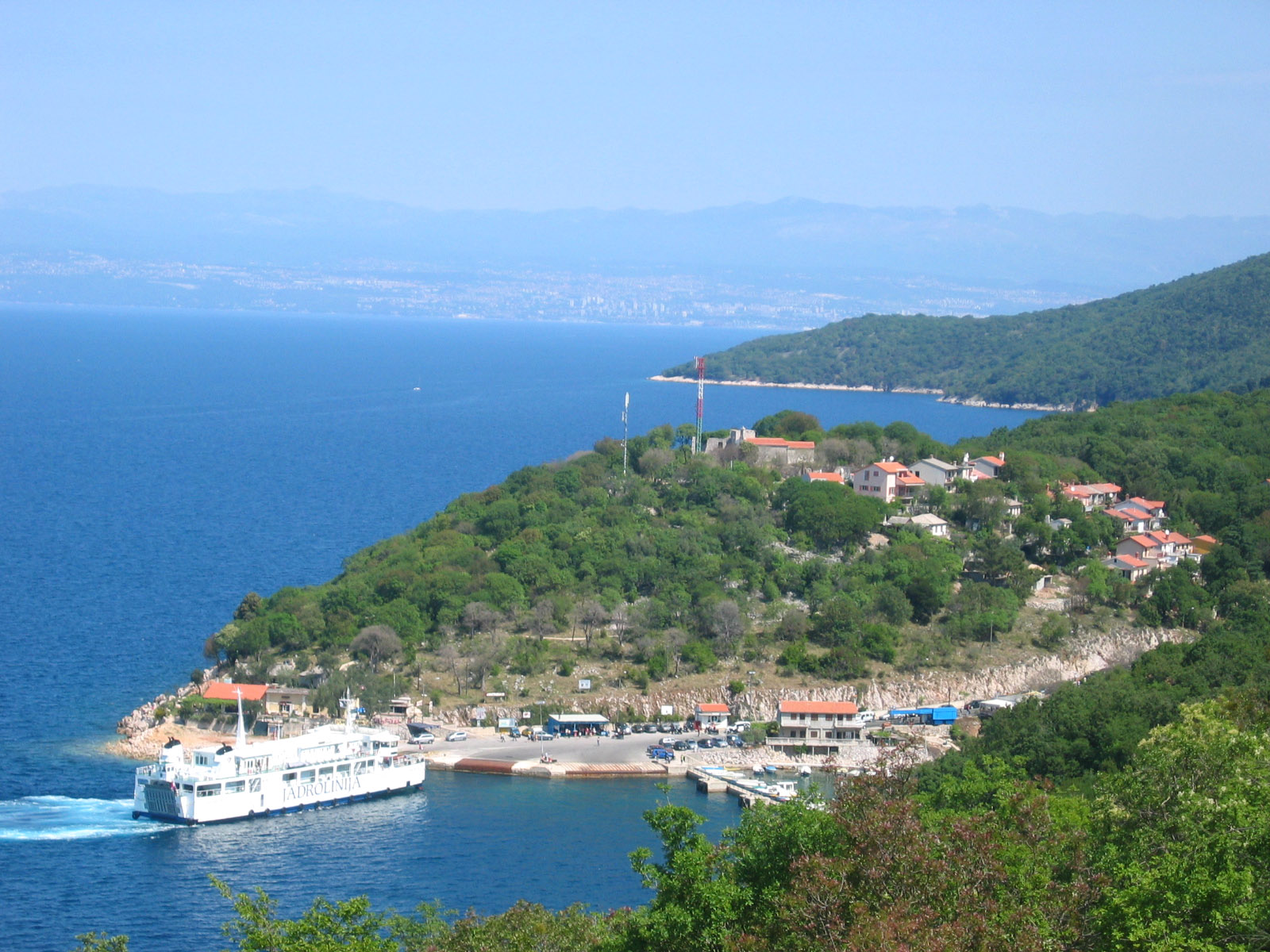
Porozina ferry port, the northern terminus of D100

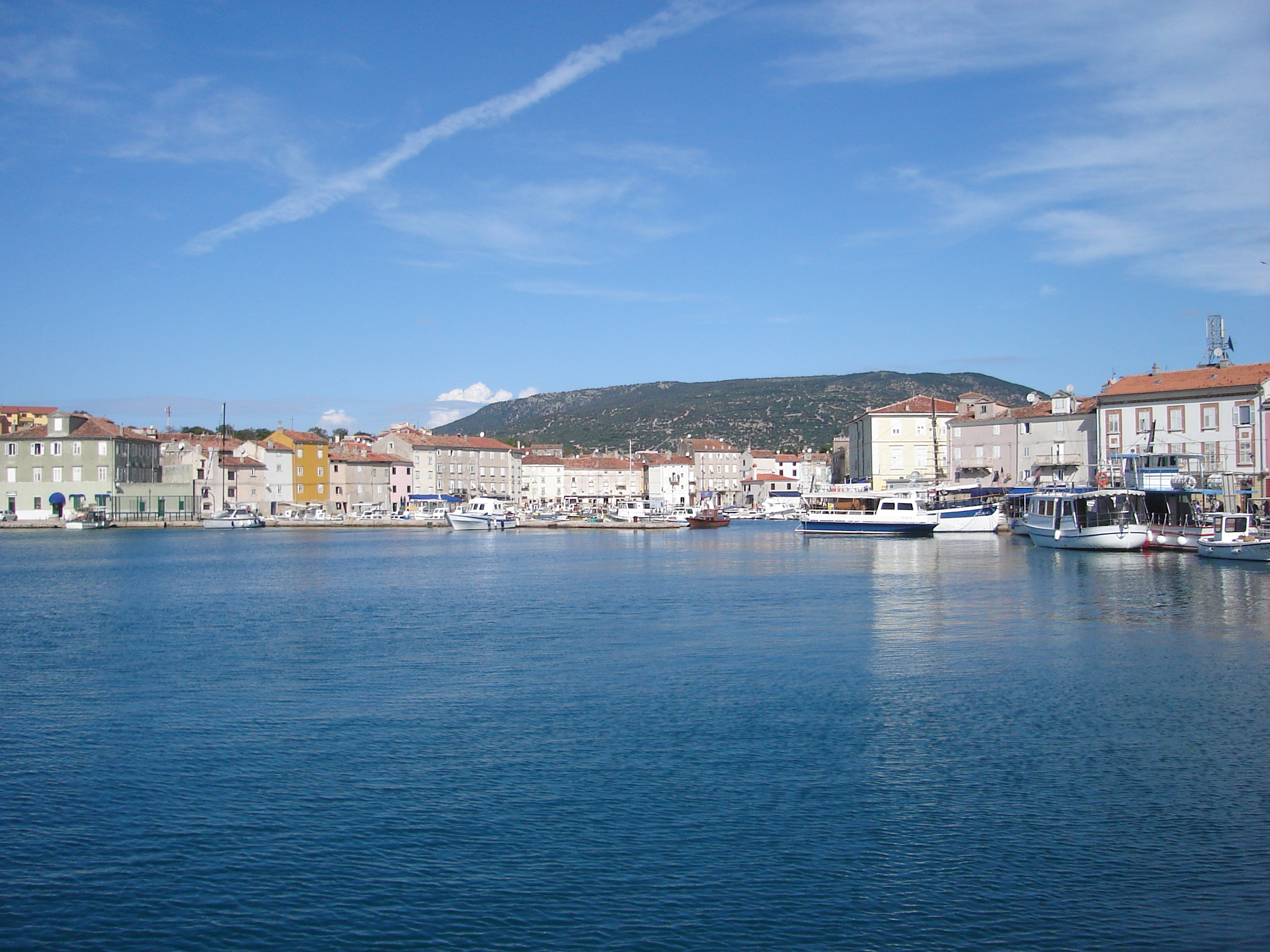
Cres, next to the D100 route

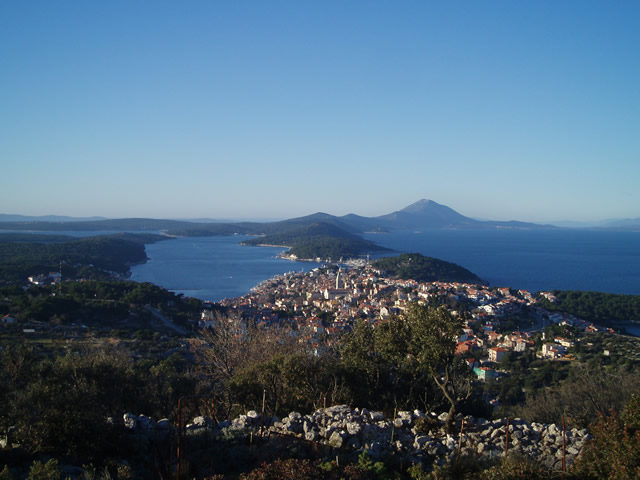
Mali Lošinj, at the southern terminus of D100

D100 is a state road in Croatia connecting Porozina ferry port - ferry access to Brestova on the mainland (via Jadrolinija) (D402) and D101 state road to Cres and Mali Lošinj. The D100 road is carried between Cres and Lošinj islands via a swing bridge in Osor across a 12 m (39 ft) wide strait. The road is 81.0 km long.

The road, as well as all other state roads in Croatia, is managed and maintained by Hrvatske ceste, a state-owned company.

== Traffic volume ==
Traffic is regularly counted and reported by Hrvatske ceste, operator of the road. Substantial variations between annual (AADT) and summer (ASDT) traffic volumes are attributed to the road carrying substantial tourist traffic along Cres and Lošinj.

D100 traffic volume
Road	Counting site	AADT	ASDT	Notes
D100	4001 Predošćica	978	3,122	Between L58084 and D101 junctions.
D100	4003 Ćunski	2,166	4,383	Between L58115 and Ž5157 junctions.

== Road junctions and populated areas ==
D100 junctions/populated areas
Type	Slip roads/Notes
	Porozina ferry port - Jadrolinija ferry access to the mainland port of Brestova and D402 state road. Northern terminus of the road.
	L58084 to Beli
	Vodice
	D101 to Merag ferry port - Jadrolinija ferry link to island of Krk
	Ž5124 to Cres
	L58096 to Loznati
	L58093 to Valun and Lubenice
	L58097 to Orlec
	L58100 to Vrana - the road actually loops from D100 to the village and back, forming two intersections with D100.
	Ž5137 to Martinšćica and Miholašćica
	Belej
	L58099 to Ustrine
	Osor - junction with L58101 to Punta Križa
	L58115 to Nerezine - the road actually loops from D100 to the settlement and back, forming three intersections with D100.
	Sveti Jakov
	Ž5157 to Lošinj Airport
	Ćunski
	L58103 to Artatore
	Mali Lošinj: Ž5158 to Mali Lošinj ferry port - Jadrolinija ferry access to Zadar (D407); Ž5159 to Čikat and Sunčana Uvala resorts Ž5161 to Veli Lošinj; Southern terminus of the road.

== See also ==
- State roads in Croatia
- Hrvatske ceste
- Jadrolinija
