= D66 road =

Road in Croatia

D66 state road

Route information
- Length: 90.1 km (56.0 mi)

Major junctions
- From: D400 in Pula
- A9 in Pula interchange D401 in Pula; D64 in Vozilići; D402 near Brestova
- To: D8 in Matulji

Location
- Country: Croatia
- Counties: Istria, Primorje-Gorski Kotar
- Major cities: Pula, Labin, Lovran, Opatija

Highway system
- Highways in Croatia

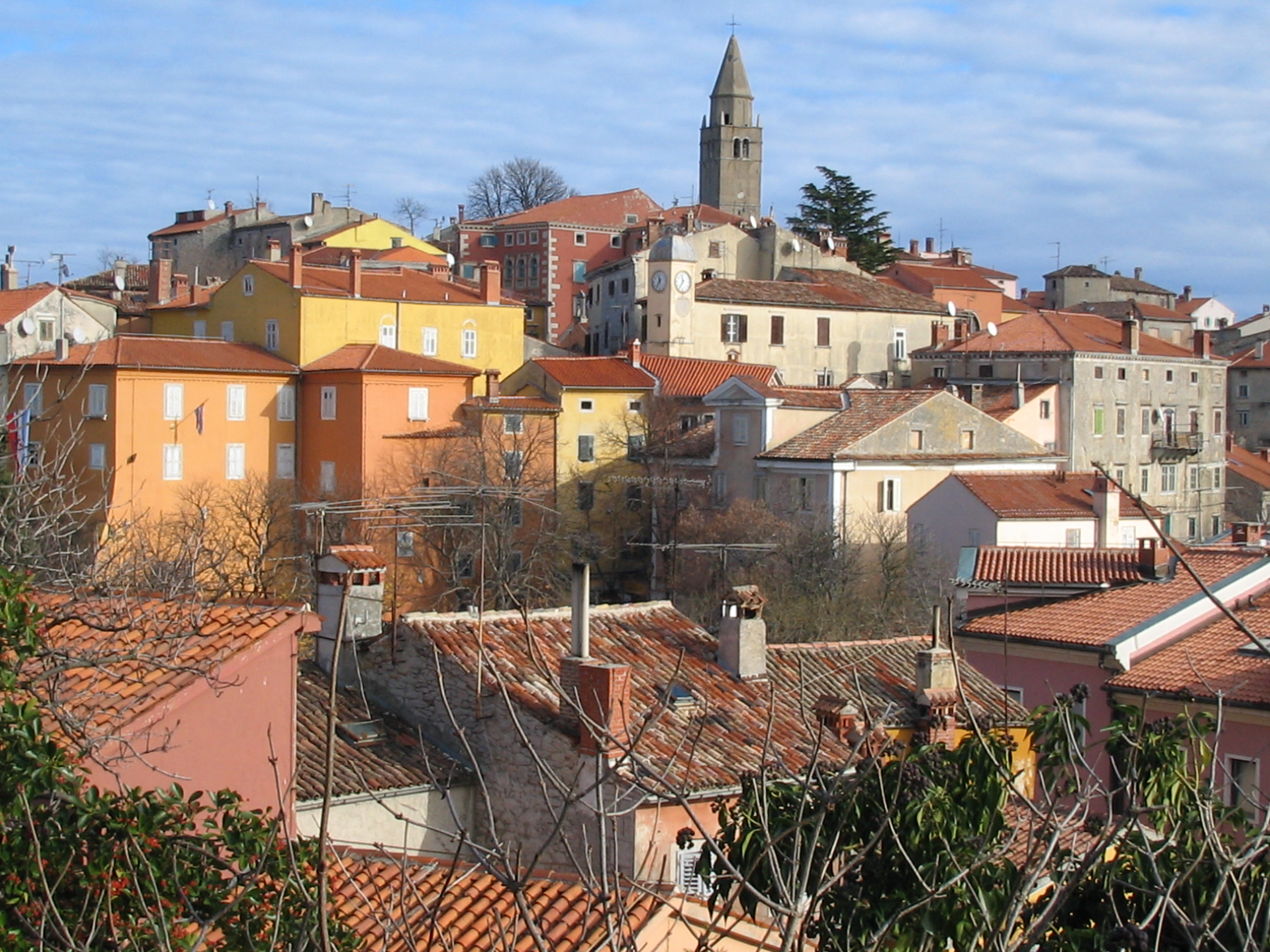
Labin, on the D66 route

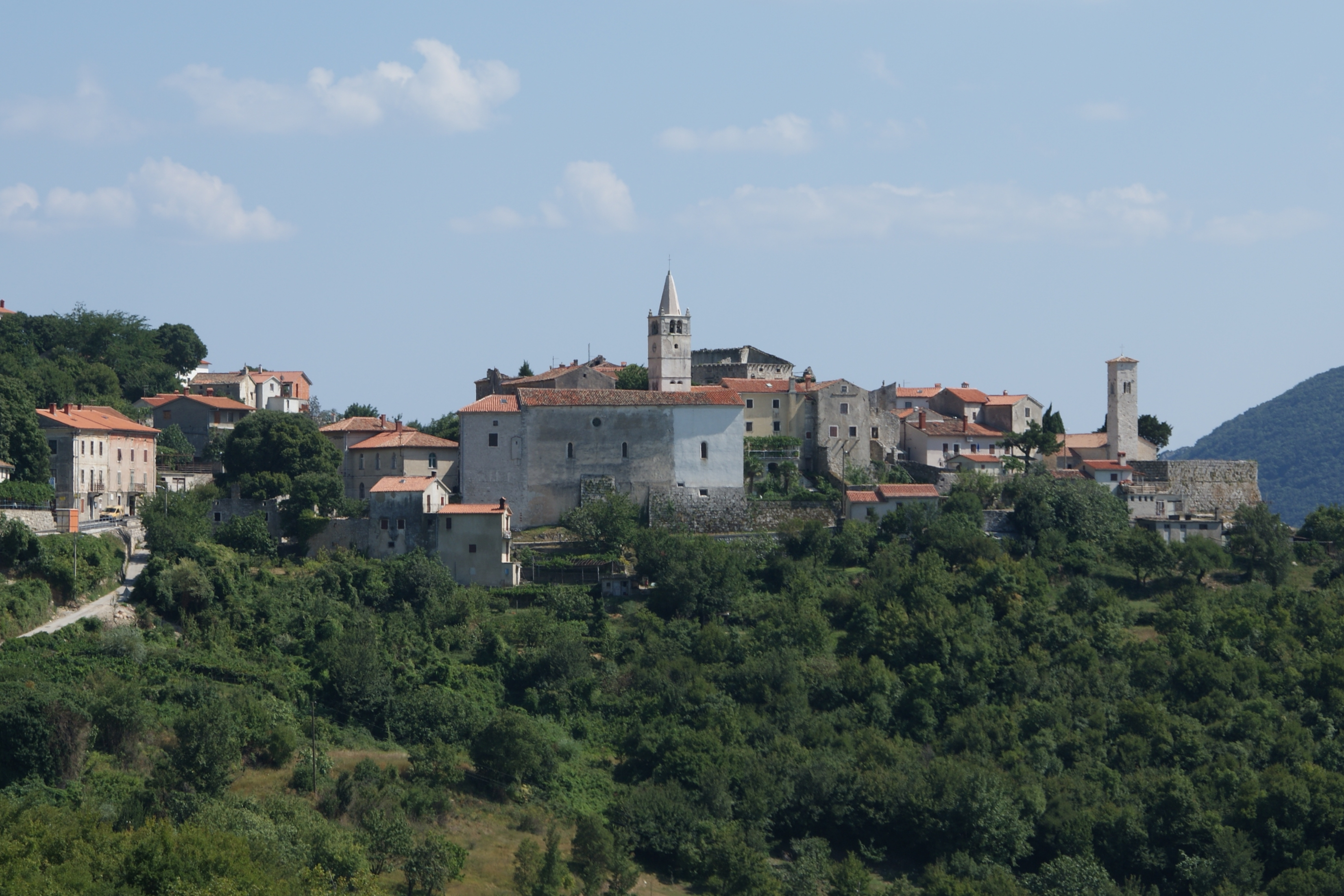
Plomin

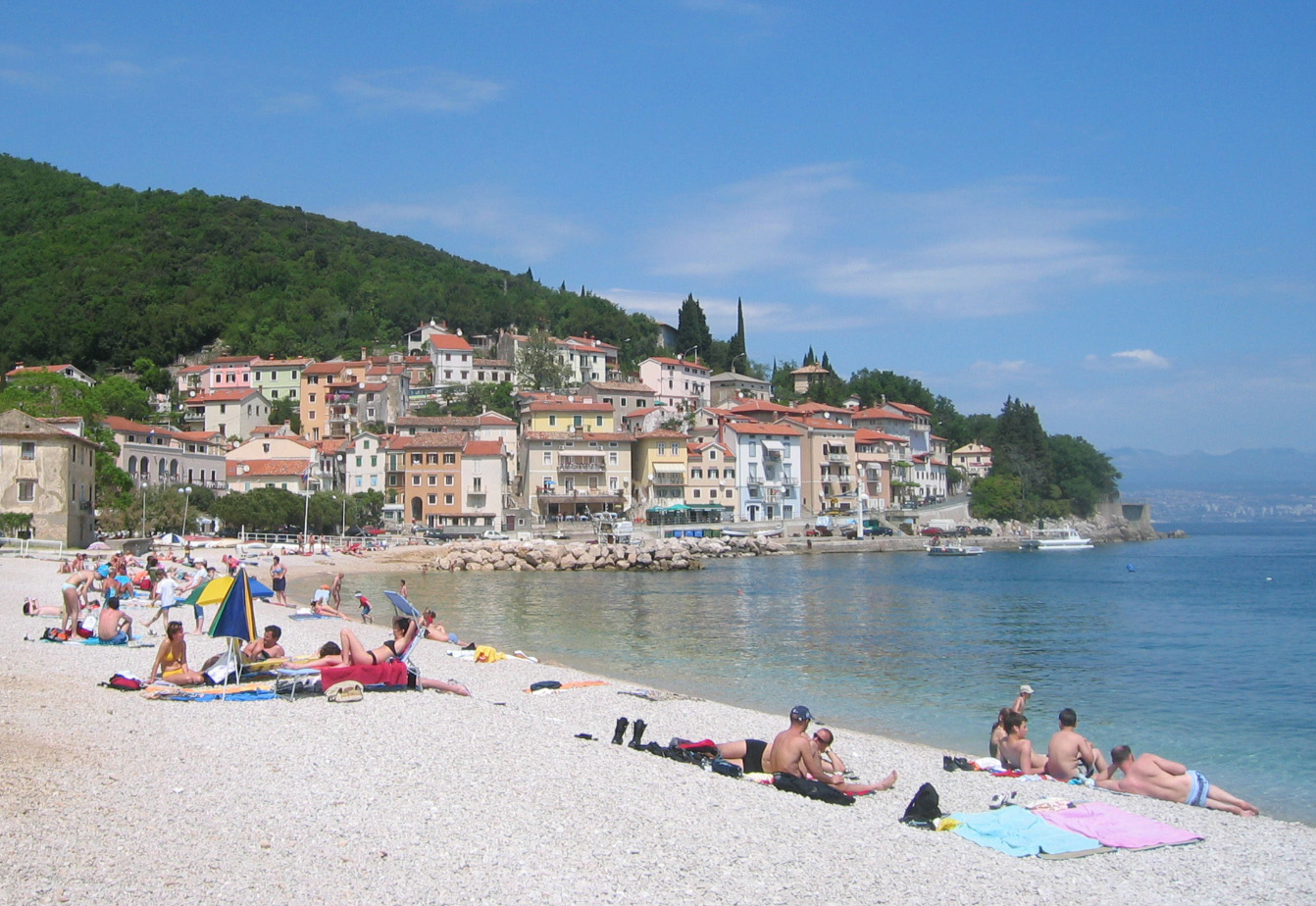
Mošćenička Draga

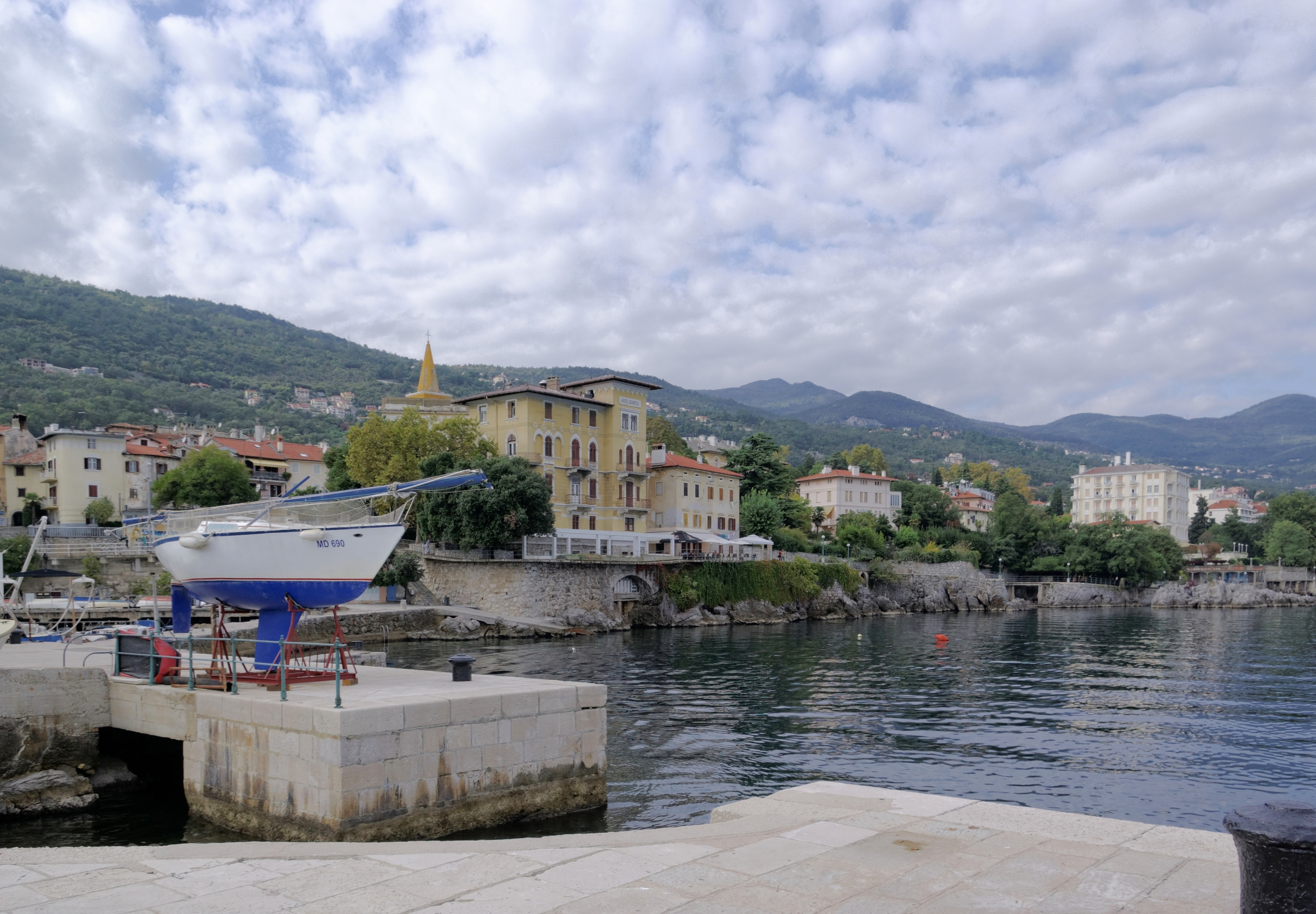
Lovran

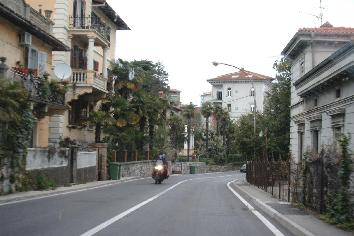
Opatija, D66 route in the city

D66 is a state road in Croatia, connecting A9 motorway with D8 state road in Matulji. D66 road serves as a connection to a number of towns and resorts along the eastern coast of Istria peninsula, including Opatija, Lovran and Ičići, as well as to Brestova ferry port, from which Jadrolinija ferries operate to the island of Cres (D100). The northern terminus of the road also provides a link towards Rijeka via D8 state road and to Matulji interchange on A8 motorway. The road is 90.1 km long.

The D66, like all other state roads in Croatia, is managed and maintained by Hrvatske ceste, a state-owned company.

== Traffic volume ==
Traffic is regularly counted and reported by Hrvatske ceste, operator of the road. Substantial variations between annual (AADT) and summer (ASDT) traffic volumes are attributed to the fact that the road connects a number of summer resorts to Croatian motorway network.

D66 traffic volume
Road	Counting site	AADT	ASDT	Notes
D66	2819 Opatija	13,539	17,253	The northernmost traffic counting site on D66.
D66	2814 Medveja	4,705	8,145	
D66	2815 Stepčići	5,700	7,800	Values estimated by HC. The site is located adjacent to the D64 junction.
D66	2817 Raša	2,965	4,612	
D66	3904 Loborika	6,229	8,345	The southernmost traffic counting site on D66, effectively counting traffic between D66 and D400.

== Road junctions and populated areas ==
D66 junctions/populated areas
Type	Slip roads/Notes
	D400 to Pula and Pula ferry port. Southern terminus of the road.
	Ž5119 to Pomer and Šišan
	A9 motorway Pula interchange.
	D401 to Pula Airport
	Loborika - junction with L50169 to Muntić and Nesactium archaeological site
	L50170 to Muntić
	Marčana - junction to Duga Uvala
	Ž5119 to Krnica
	L50164 to Divšići
	L50154 to Manjadvorci
	Ž5100 to Manjadvorci; L50145 to Hreljići
	to Borinići
	to Želiski
	L50153 to Hrboki
	L50152 to Puntera
	Barban - junction with Ž5077 to Žminj
	D421 to Bršica terminal of the Port of Rijeka
	Raša
	to Krapan
	to Kapelica
	Labin: Ž5081 to Kršan; Ž5103 to Koromacno; Ž5104 to Rabac and Girandella resort
	Štrmac - junction with L50187 to Režanci
	to Vrećari
	Vozilići: D64 to Pazin; Ž5172 to Plomin Luka; L50180 to Kožljak resort
	Plomin
	D402 to Brestova ferry port providing access to Porozina, Cres (by Jadrolinija) and D100
	Zagore
	Brseč - junction with L58064
	to Golovik
	Mošćenička Draga - junction with Ž5082 to Mošćenice
	to Obrš
	Donji Kraj
	Medveja
	Lovran - junction with Ž5050 to Liganj
	Ika
	Ičići - junction with Ž5048 to Veprinac
	Opatija - junction with Ž5051 to D8 state road
	Volosko
	Matulji: D8 to A8 motorway Matulji interchange and Rijeka; Northern terminus of the road.
