= Lošinj =

Croatian island in the northern Adriatic Sea

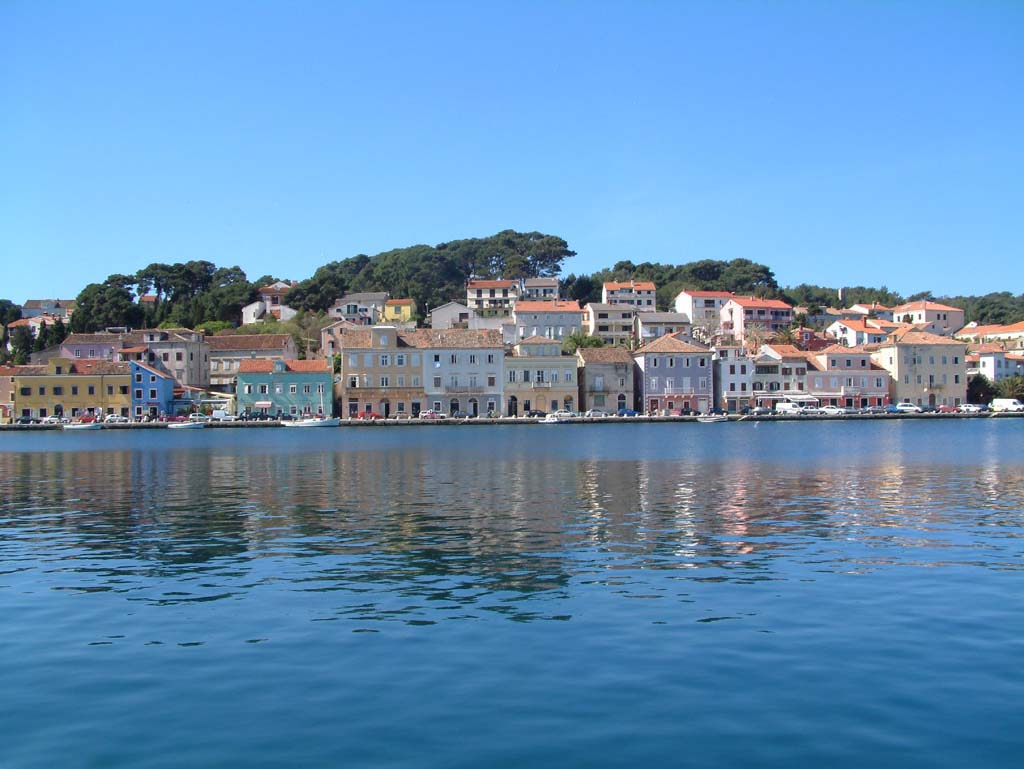
- Mali Lošinj

Geography
- Location: Adriatic Sea
- Coordinates: 44°35′N 14°24′E
- Archipelago: Cres-Lošinj
- Area: 74.36 km^{2} (28.71 sq mi)
- Length: 33 km (20.5 mi)
- Width: .25–4.75 km (0.16–2.95 mi)
- Coastline: 112.7 km (70.03 mi)
- Highest elevation: 588 m (1929 ft)
- Highest point: Televrin

Administration
- Croatia
- County: Primorje-Gorski Kotar County
- Largest settlement: Mali Lošinj (pop. 8,116)

Demographics
- Population: 9,587 (2011)
- Pop. density: 128.5/km^{2} (332.8/sq mi)

Lošinj (pronounced [lɔ̌ʃiːɲ]; Italian: Lussino; Venetian: Lusin, earlier Osero; German: Lötzing; Latin: Apsorrus; Ancient Greek: Ἄψωρος) is a Croatian island in the northern Adriatic Sea, in the Kvarner Gulf. It is almost due south of the city of Rijeka and part of the Primorje-Gorski Kotar County. The settlements on Lošinj include Nerezine, Sveti Jakov, Ćunski, Artatore, Mali Lošinj and Veli Lošinj. A regional road runs the length of the island; ferry connections (via the island of Cres) include Brestova - Porozina, Merag - Valbiska, Mali Lošinj - Zadar and Mali Lošinj - Pula. Lošinj Airport is on the island.

== Geography ==
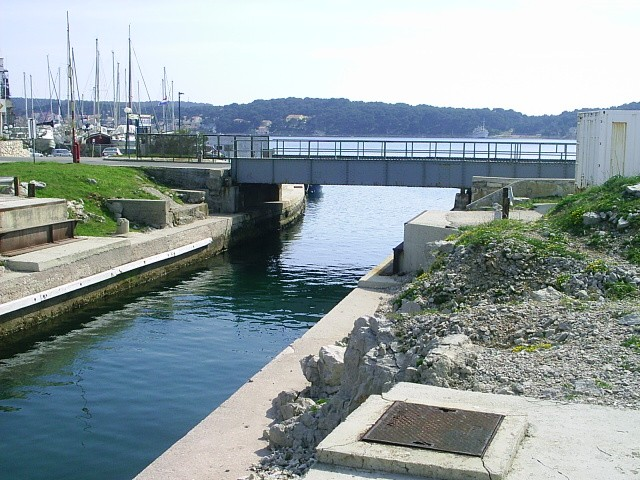
Small bridge connecting Lošinj (right) and Cres (left)

Lošinj is part of the Cres-Lošinj archipelago. The Cres-Lošinj archipelago includes the two major islands Cres and Lošinj, some minor islands Unije, Ilovik, Susak, Vele Srakane, Male Srakane and a number of uninhabited small islets and outcrops. Cres is the largest by area, followed by Lošinj. Cres and Lošinj are connected by a small bridge at the town of Osor on Cres. The highest elevations are the mountains Televrin (also called Osoršćica) at 588 m (1,929 ft) and Sv. Nikola (also called Sv. Mikul) at 557 m (1,827 ft). The towns of Nerezine and Sveti Jakov lie at their base. The island bedrock is formed predominantly of chalk limestone and dolomite rocks. There are sand deposits in the western part of the Kurila peninsula.

Lošinj is the 11th largest Adriatic island by area, 33 km (21 mi) long, with the width varying from 4.75 km (2.95 mi) in the north and middle of the island, to 0.25 km (0.16 mi) near the town of Mali Lošinj. The total coastline of the island is 112.7 km (70.0 mi).

=== Climate ===
The island has a mild climate and evergreen vegetation (like myrtle, holm oak, and laurel). Veli Lošinj, Čikat and the south-west facing shores are ringed by pine forests, while the highest elevations in the north of the island have more sparse vegetation.

Around 2600 sunshine hours a year make the island a popular tourist destination in the summer months, especially for nearby Slovenian, German and Italian visitors. On average humidity is 70% and temperatures average 24 °C (75 °F) in the summer and 7 °C (45 °F) during the winter.

=== Winds ===
As with other locations on the Adriatic, Lošinj is prone to a variety of Winds. The Bura is a north-easterly wind that brings low temperatures and dry air masses from the continent, sometimes the gusts are strong enough to turn over heavy vehicles. The Jugo is a southerly wind that originates in the Sahara, however, over the relatively long fetch over the warm waters of the Mediterranean it becomes moisture-laden, and typically brings much cloud and stormy weather. Traditionally, it is reputed to cause headaches, melancholy and even bouts of madness in the inhabitants of the coastal areas, especially Dalmatians.

== Important bird area ==
The island forms part of the Kvarner Islands Important Bird Area (IBA), designated as such by BirdLife International because it supports significant numbers of many bird species, including breeding populations of several birds of prey.

== History ==
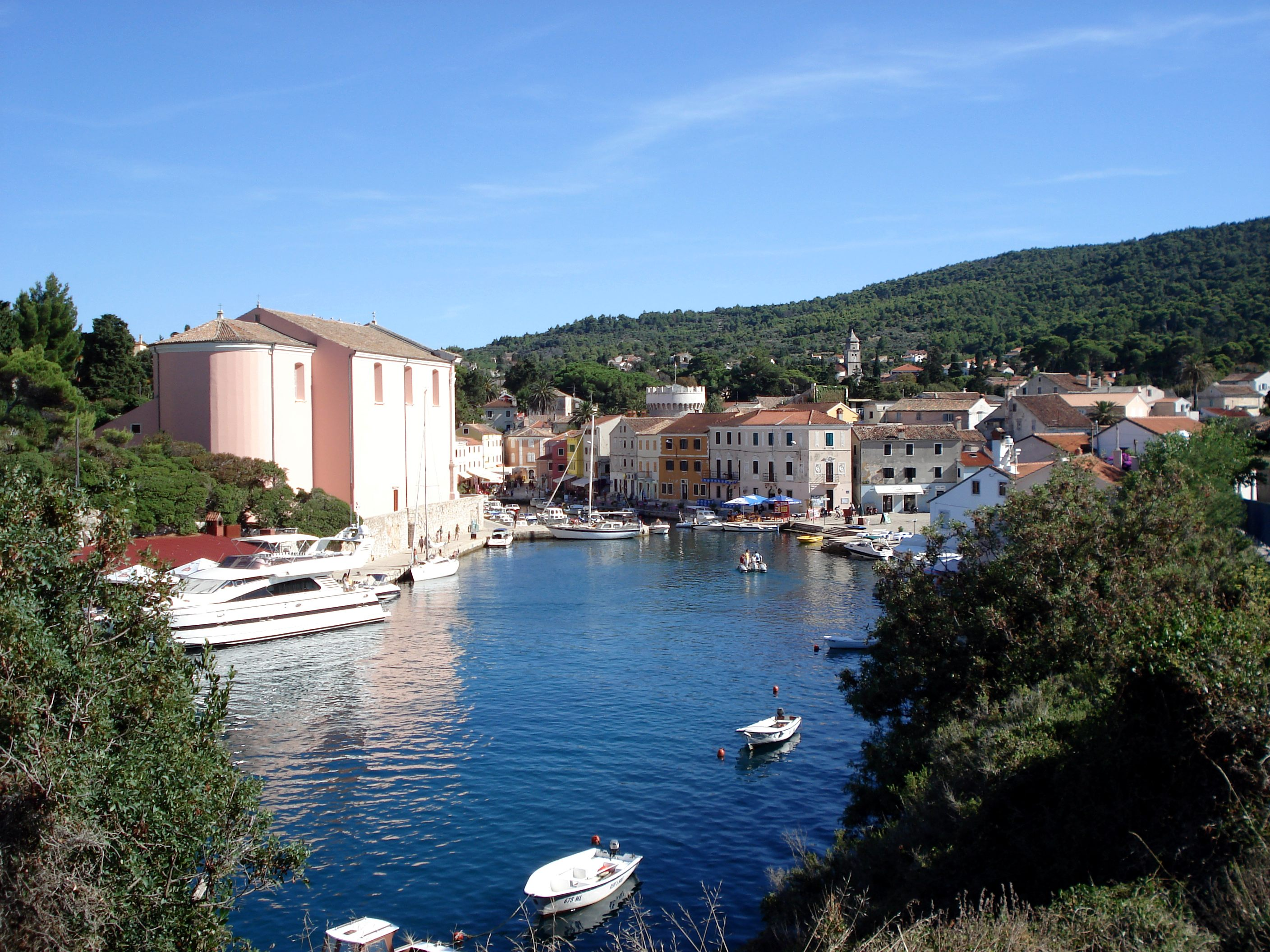
The old town of Veli Lošinj

Settlement on nearby Cres is known to date back around 12,000 years, and the island of Lošinj is also thought to have been inhabited since prehistoric times. This is evidenced by hill-forts at the foot of Osoršćica and around the port of Mali Lošinj. According to Ptolemy, the Romans called this island Apsorrus (Ancient Greek: Ἄψορρος), and referred to the islands of Lošinj and Cres collectively as Apsirtides. In several places, ruins of Roman villas have been excavated (villae rusticae: Liski, Sveti Jakov, and Studenčić near Ćunski). Several small eremitic churches dating from the Roman era have been preserved (St. Lovreć near Osor, and St. James in Sveti Jakov).In the Middle Ages, Lošinj was the property of the clerical and secular nobility of Osor and unpopulated.

The first evidence of settlers from the mainland was in 1280. Pursuant to a contract with Osor, their settlements gained self-governance in 1389. The name Lošinj was first mentioned in 1384. Parallel with the gradual decline of Osor from the 15th century onwards, the settlements Veli Lošinj and Mali Lošinj played an increasingly important role.

In the 18th and 19th centuries, trade, shipbuilding and seafaring on the island developed more intensely. In 1771, Alberto Fortis visited Cres and Lošinj (which was then called Osero) and wrote a travelogue about his visit: Saggio d'osservazioni sopra l'isola di Cherso ed Osero. After the fall of the Republic of Venice in 1797, Lošinj became part of the Austrian province (crown land) of Istria under the Treaty of Campo Formio. By 1900 the population had reached 11,615. In 1921, it was given as 15,000.

Tourism appeared on Lošinj for the first time in 1885 with the appearance of health tourism. The first hotel in Lošinj, Vindobona, was built in 1887.

In 1919, Lošinj, with its partially Italian population, became part of Italy under the terms of the Treaty of Saint-Germain, as confirmed by the 1920 Treaty of Rapallo. It was part of Italy until 1943 when it was occupied by German Wehrmacht and Croatian troops during World War II as part of the Operational Zone Adriatic Coast. In 1947 the island and the rest of Croatia became part of Yugoslavia, until Croatia declared independence from the Yugoslav Federation in 1991.

The post-Second World War period saw a substantial exodus (see Istrian–Dalmatian exodus for further details) of its Italian-speaking population to Italy and to other countries. According to the last census the number of Italian-speaking citizens in Lošinj were 557 (6.64% of the total official resident population). Before the independence of Croatia from the Yugoslav Federation, the official censuses reported the Italian-speaking minority being much smaller (figures quoted in the official census conducted in 1981 shows that the Italian minority accounted only for 1.5% of the resident population). Expatriates in Italy and around the world publish a newsletter which keeps their memories and traditions alive. On the Island Italian is popular as a second language.

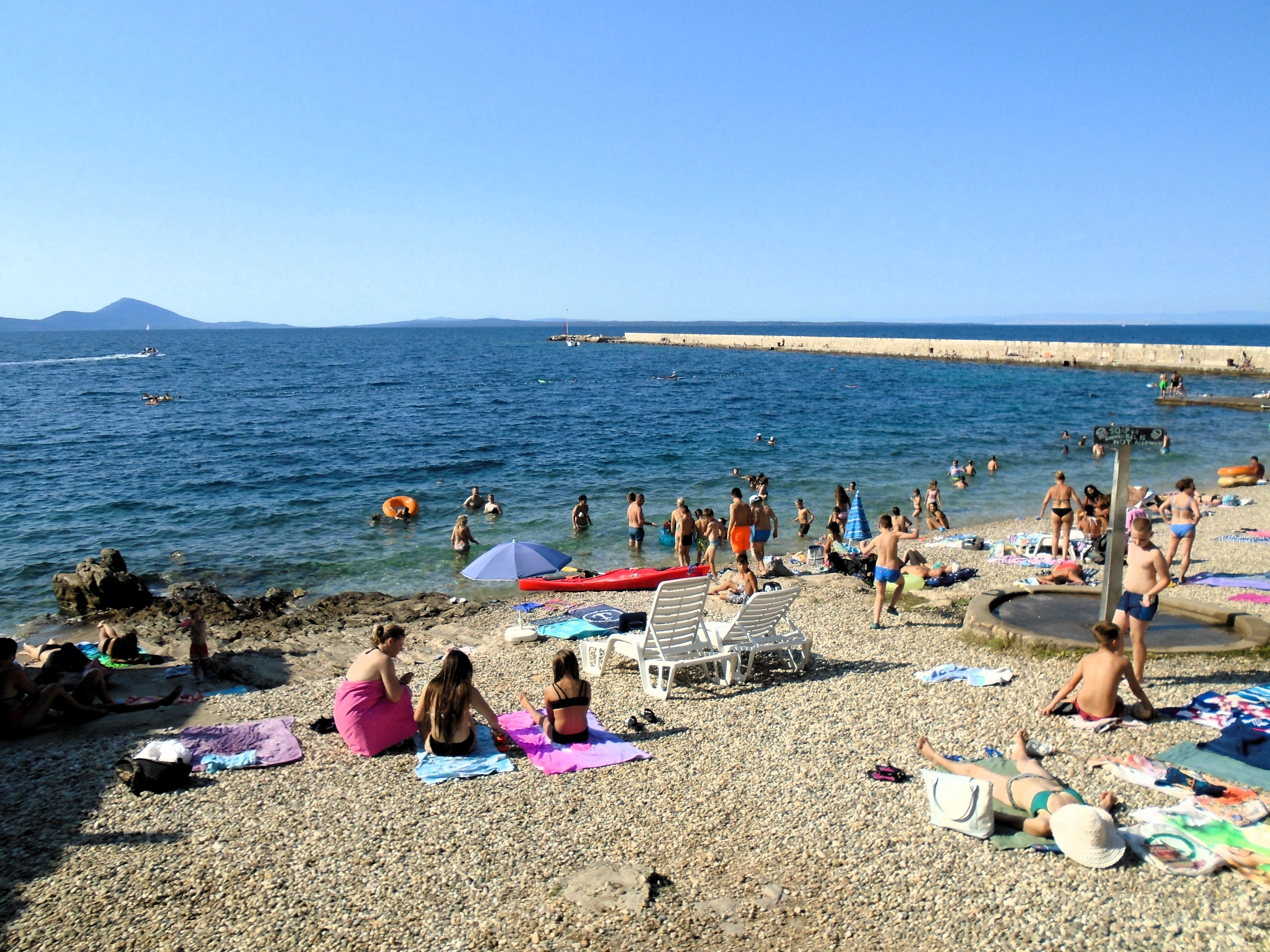
Rovenska beach at Veli Lošinj

Due to its temperate climate, and non-withstanding the occasional episode of high winds, Losinj started becoming a tourist destination of international renown. Russian oligarchs and consortia have invested in properties on the Island.

== People and art ==
- Agostino Straulino (b. 10 October 1914 in Mali Lošinj; d. 14 December 2004 in Rome) was an Italian sailor and sailboat racer, who won one Olympic gold medal at the 1952 Summer Olympics (Helsinki) and one silver medal at the 1956 Summer Olympics (Melbourne) in the Star class, and eight consecutive European championships (1949–56) and two world championships (1952–53) in this class and was world champion in the 5.5m-class. His first experiences were sailing in the Kvarner Gulf, and he learned to sail going to school in his boat.

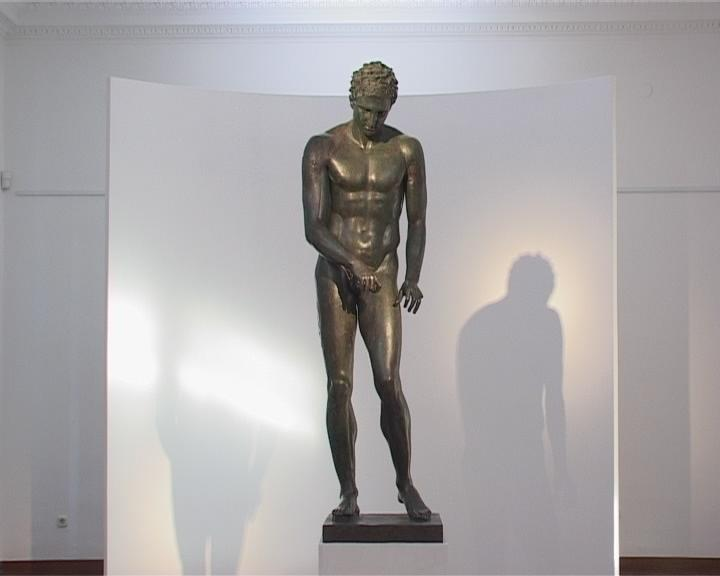
The bronze Apoxyomenos, found and recovered off Vele Orjule, Croatia

- Gaudentius of Ossero: Born c. 1000 AD and presided over the Diocese of Ossero (Osor) as bishop and later became a saint and patron of the island. Legend has it that he banished all venomous snakes from the islands while hiding in a cave from his persecutors. His remains now lie in the altar of the church bearing his name in Osor.
- The Cosulich family of shipbuilders originated in Lošinj probably prior to the 18th century and rose to prominence in the region, eventually establishing a successful shipping business in Venice and around the world, where the Cosulich Line became renowned.
- Croatian Apoxyomenos: (the "Scraper") is a bronze statue that dates back to the 1st or 2nd century BC. This type of figure was first developed by the Greek sculptor Lysippos of the 4th century BC. It was discovered underwater in the Lošinj archipelago near the uninhabited island of Vele Orjule. The Lošinj Channel was a frequent navigational route leading to the northern part of the Adriatic, to Istria and Italy. It is believed to be from a Roman shipwreck although there are no other apparent remnants. Apoxyomenos is one of the Greek conventions in representing an athlete, caught in the familiar act of scraping sweat and dust from his body with the small curved instrument that the Greeks called a strigil. The statue now resides in the Lošinj museum in the Mali Lošinj harbour.

== Bibliography ==
=== Biology ===
- Šašić, Martina; Nahirnić, Ana; Tarmann, Gerhard M. (2016-12-31). "Zygaenidae (Lepidoptera) in the Lepidoptera collections of the Croatian Natural History Museum". Natura Croatica: Periodicum Musei Historiae Naturalis Croatici. 25 (2): 233–248. doi:10.20302/NC.2016.25.19. eISSN 1848-7386.
