= D101 road =

Road in Croatia

D101 state road

Route information
- Length: 10.9 km (6.8 mi)

Major junctions
- From: Merag ferry port
- To: D100 near Cres

Location
- Country: Croatia
- Counties: Primorje-Gorski Kotar

Highway system
- Highways in Croatia

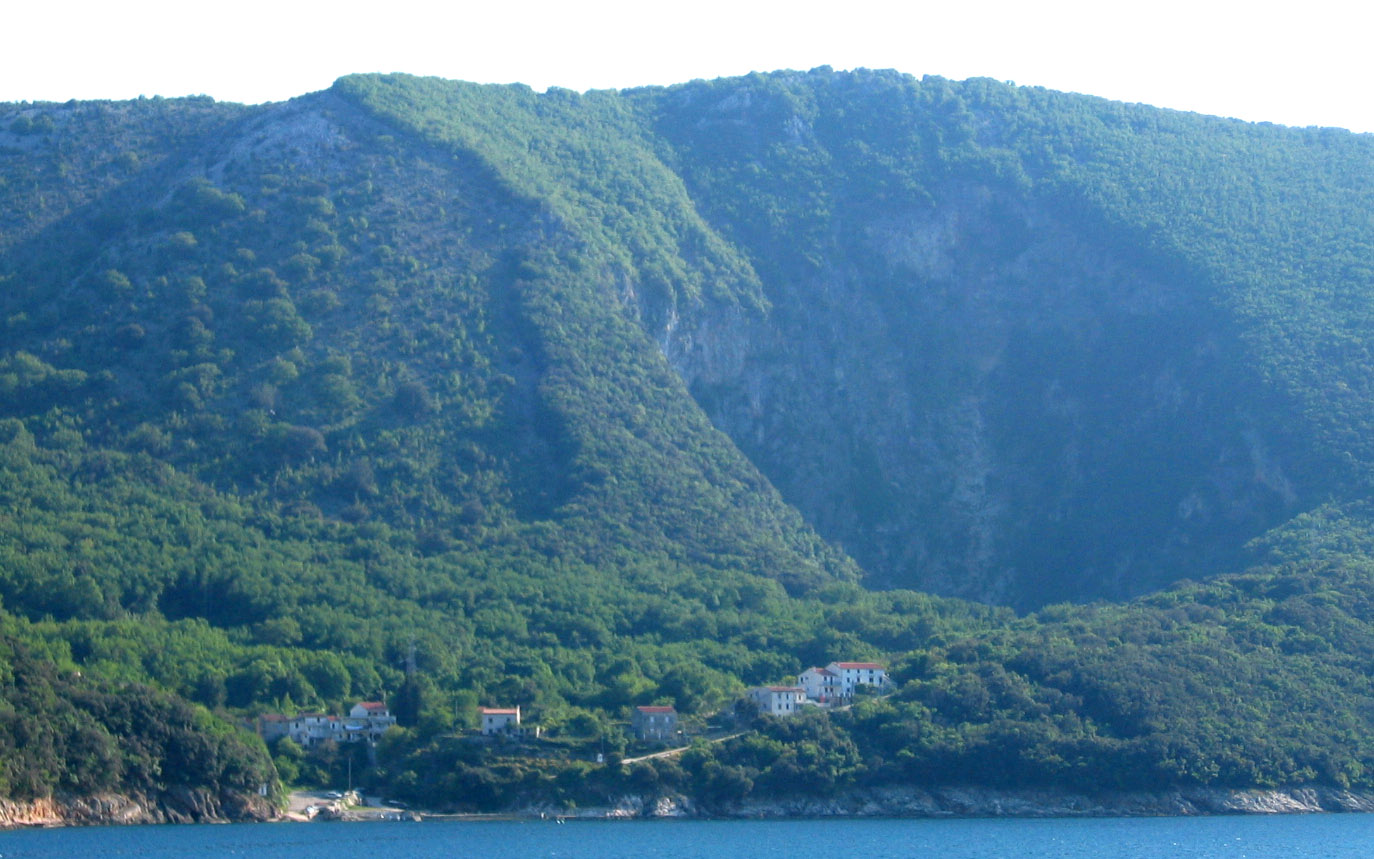
Merag ferry port, the eastern terminus of D101

D101 is a state road connecting D100 state road to Merag ferry port, from where Jadrolinija ferries fly to Valbiska, Krk and D104 state road. The road is 10.9 km long.

The road, as well as all other state roads in Croatia, is managed and maintained by Hrvatske ceste, a state-owned company.

== Traffic volume ==
D101 traffic is not counted directly, however the operator Hrvatske ceste reports the number of vehicles using ferry service flying from Merag port, accessed by the D101 road, thereby allowing the D101 traffic volume to be deduced. Substantial variations between annual (AADT) and summer (ASDT) traffic volumes are attributed to the fact that the road serves as a connection carrying substantial tourist traffic to the Krk Island.

D101 traffic volume
Road	Counting site	AADT	ASDT	Notes
D101	332 Valbiska-Merag ferry	958	1,976	Traffic to the island of Krk.

== Road junctions and populated areas ==
D101 junctions
Type	Slip roads/Notes
	Merag ferry port – Jadrolinija ferry access to Valbiska, island of Krk (D104). Eastern terminus of the road.
	D100 to Porozina ferry port (to the north) and Cres and Lošinj (to the south). Western terminus of the road.

== See also ==
- Hrvatske ceste
- Jadrolinija
