= D402 road =

Road in Croatia

D402 state road

Route information
- Length: 3.2 km (2.0 mi)

Major junctions
- From: D66 near Zagore
- To: Brestova ferry port

Location
- Country: Croatia
- Counties: Istria

Highway system
- Highways in Croatia

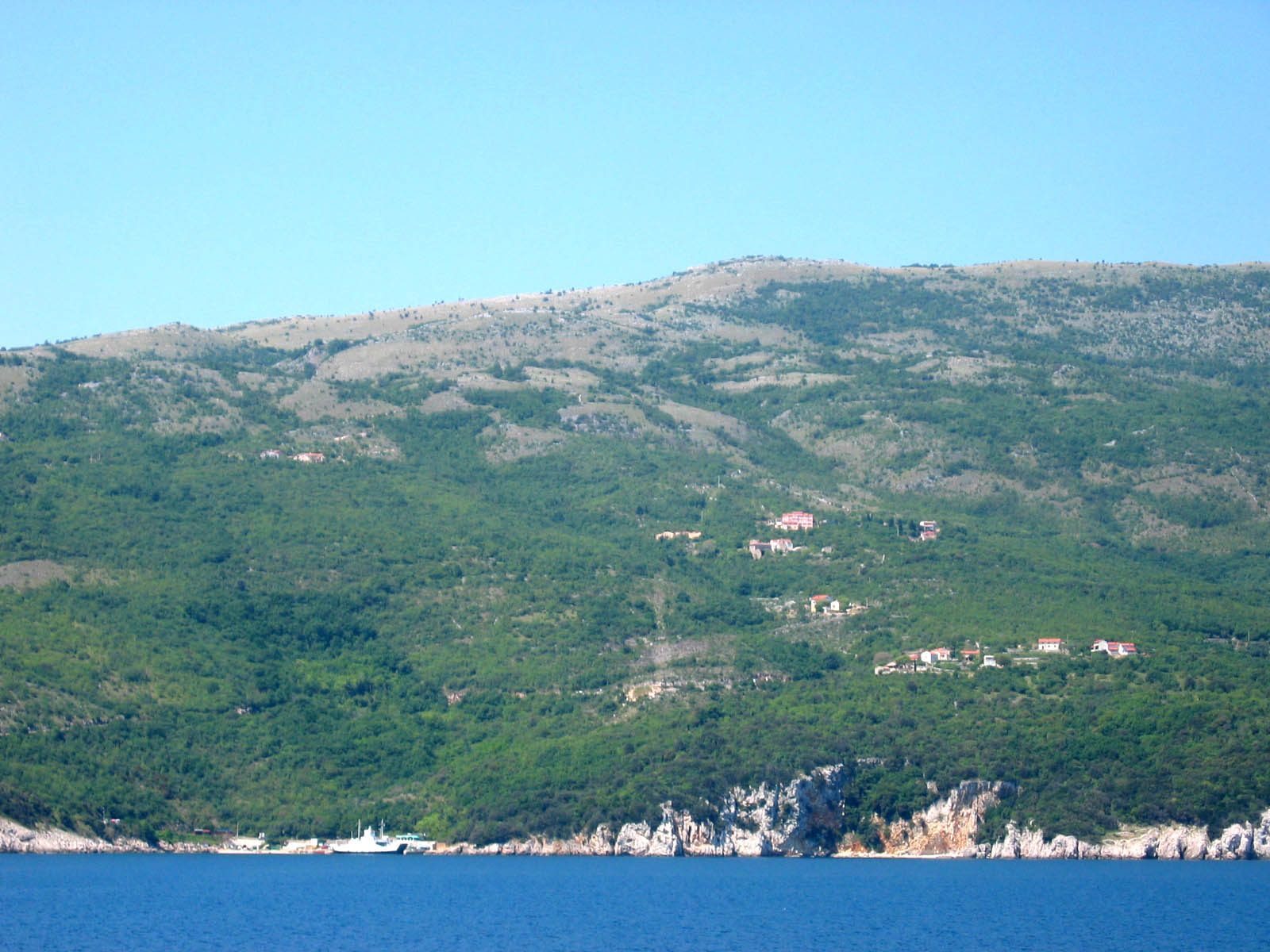
Brestova ferry port

D402 is a state road connecting D66 state road to Brestova ferry port, from where ferries fly to Porozina, Cres and D100 state road. The road is 3.2 km long.

The D402, like all state roads in Croatia, is managed and maintained by Hrvatske ceste, state owned company.

== Traffic volume ==
There are no official published data on volume of traffic carried by the D402 road, however, Hrvatske ceste, the operator of the road, publishes information on average annual daily traffic (AADT) and average summer daily traffic (ASDT) carried by Brestova - Porozina ferry line, connecting D402 and D100 state roads. It may be safely concluded that traffic carried by D402 at least matches those figures.

D402 volume of traffic
| Road | Counting site | AADT | ASDT | Notes |
| D402 | Brestova ferry port | 725 | 2,052 | Number of vehicles using Brestova-Porozina ferry line (number 334), published by Hrvatske Ceste. |

== Road junctions and populated areas ==
D402 junctions
| Type | Slip roads/Notes |
| | D66 to Rijeka, Matulji and A8 motorway (to the north) and Pula (to the south). Western terminus of the road. |
| | Brestova ferry port - ferry access to Porozina, island of Cres (D100). Eastern terminus of the road. |
