= Ćunski =

Village in Primorje-Gorski Kotar, Croatia

- Village
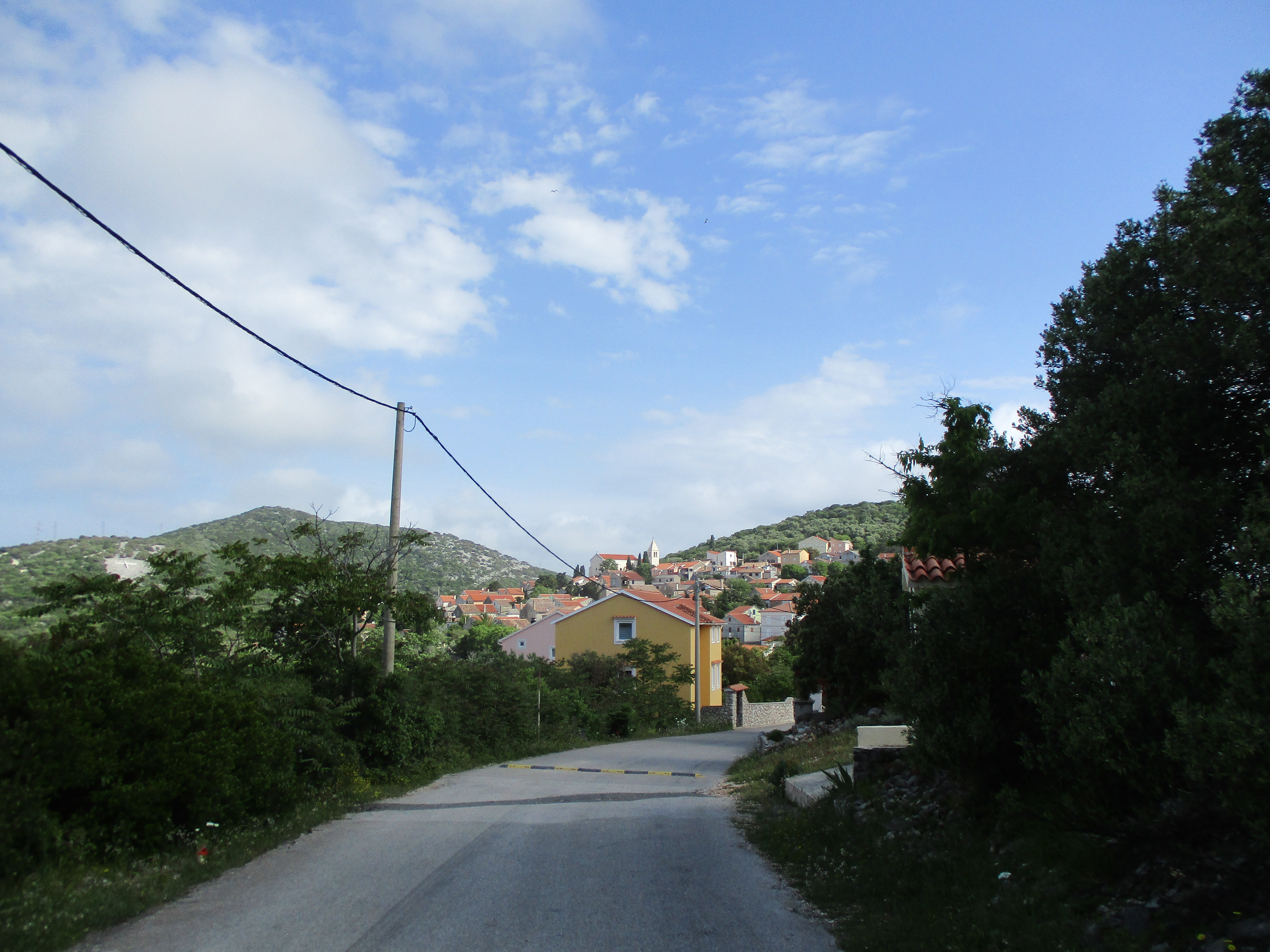
- View of a street in Ćunski

- Location within Croatia
- Coordinates: 44.58912°N 14.40973°E
- Country: Croatia
- County: Primorje-Gorski Kotar
- Town: Mali Lošinj

Area
  - Total: 14.5 km^{2} (5.6 sq mi)

Population (2021)
  - Total: 198
  - Density: 13.7/km^{2} (35.4/sq mi)
- Time zone: UTC+1 (CET)
  - Summer (DST): UTC+2 (CEST)
- Postal code: 51564
- Area code: 051
- Vehicle registration: RI

Ćunski is a small village in the central part of the Croatian island of Lošinj. Administratively, it is part of the town of Mali Lošinj. As of 2021, it had a population of 198. It is sheltered from the bora (Adriatic northern wind) and is located on the southern slope of a hill with a view of the western shores of the Kvarner bay.

The main road below Ćunski branches off leading to Lošinj Airport. Also nearby on the western coast is Artatore, which is a popular tourist town.

== History ==
The present village is no longer the original old settlement which evolved from a fort dating back to Roman times. As the land here was fertile, and the sea was rich with fish, the area was populated as early as the Bronze Age, and during Roman times there were numerous villas (villae rusticae) along the shores. The ruins of one villa are still recognizable in the Studencic bay, together with the remains of a sarcophagus. An old built-up fountain also still exists there.

During the 16th century the old church of St. Nicholas was built, then enlarged in 1784, in appearance very similar to the St. Mary Magdalene church in Nerezine. It was torn down in order to build a simple, single-nave church with a rectangular sanctuary in 1908, which is still there today, with a bell tower added in 1923. Unfortunately, there is very little left of the original lavish artistic interior decorations.

== Notable people from Ćunski ==
- Valter Župan (born 1938), Bishop Emeritus of Krk
