= D101 =

D101 may refer to:

- D101 road (Croatia), a state road connecting D100 state road to Merag ferry port
- Demonology 101, an online graphic novel written and drawn by Faith Erin Hicks
