= Medveja =

Medveja may refer to:

- Medveja, Moldova
- Medveja, Croatia
