= Sveti Jakov =

Village in Primorje-Gorski Kotar, Croatia

Sveti Jakov San Giacomo Lussignano
- Village
- Location within Croatia
- Coordinates: 44.640117°N 14.39347°E
- Country: Croatia
- County: Primorje-Gorski Kotar
- Town: Mali Lošinj

Area
  - Total: 7.4 km^{2} (2.9 sq mi)

Population (2021)
  - Total: 74
  - Density: 10/km^{2} (26/sq mi)
- Time zone: UTC+1 (CET)
  - Summer (DST): UTC+2 (CEST)
- Postal code: 51554
- Area code: 051
- Vehicle registration: RI

Sveti Jakov (Italian: San Giacomo Lussignano) is a village on the Croatian island of Lošinj, in Primorje-Gorski Kotar. Administratively, it is part of the town of Mali Lošinj. As of 2021, it had a population of 74. Located to the south of Nerezine, it is connected by the Croatian D100 highway.
