= D421 road =

Road in Croatia

D421 state road

Route information
- Length: 3.6 km (2.2 mi)

Major junctions
- From: D66 near Raša
- To: Bršica port

Location
- Country: Croatia
- Counties: Istria

Highway system
- Highways in Croatia

D421 is a state road connecting D66 state road to Bršica terminal of the Port of Rijeka. The road is 3.6 km (2.2 mi) long.

The road, as well as all other state roads in Croatia, is managed and maintained by Hrvatske ceste, state owned company.

== Road junctions and populated areas ==
D421 junctions
Type	Slip roads/Notes
	D66 to Rijeka, Matulji and A8 motorway (to the north) and Pula (to the south). Northern terminus of the road.
	Bršica terminal of the Port of Rijeka - Southern terminus of the road.
