= Gaudentius of Ossero =

Saint Gaudentius of Ossero
- Born: unknown
- Died: May 31, 1044; Ancona, Italy
- Venerated in: Roman Catholic Church
- Major shrine: Ancona
- Patronage: City of Ancona

Gaudentius of Ossero (Latin: Gaudentius Auxerensis; Italian: Gaudenzio di Ossero) was bishop of Ossero, on the island of Lussino (today Lošinj, Croatia) in the Istrian March from 1030 to 1042. June 1 is his Feast Day.

== Life ==
A Vita was composed by an anonymous monk in the mid to late 11th century.

According to his Vita, Gaudentius was a native of Osor, where he later became bishop. Gaudentius was persecuted by other ecclesiastical leaders. Falsely accused, he travelled to Rome in 1032 to defend his name. His request to abdicate his see was declined, and he was sent back with letters of approbation. On the way home, he fell ill in Ancona, and stayed there to recover. He then resigned his see in 1042, and became a Benedictine monk under Saint Peter Damian. He died in 1044 of natural causes. A church was built in his name in Ossero (today Osor) in the 14th century. It still currently holds his relics in the altar.

== The legend ==
There is a legendary history of St. Gaudentius. It is believed that his reforms did not comply with the wishes of some noblemen from Ossero, who took advantage of the instability within the papal state and attacked him. Bishop Gaudentius escaped and hid at the base of Mount Ossero. There he lived in a cave for one year. The cave was full of snakes and while he was repenting, he begged God for mercy to free these islands forever from poisonous snakes. He escaped to Rome and he continued with his penitential life in the Benedictine monastery in Ancona, Italy, where he died on May 31, 1044.

One hundred years later, all the bells of Ossero started to ring by themselves early before dawn. Later that day, the citizens found a wooden chest in the sea under the town wall. In it, there was another iron chest with the body of St. Gaudentius. He was proclaimed the patron saint of the town and the whole island. His remains are now in the altar of the church named after him.
