= Lovran =

- Municipality
- Lovran Municipality; Općina Lovran
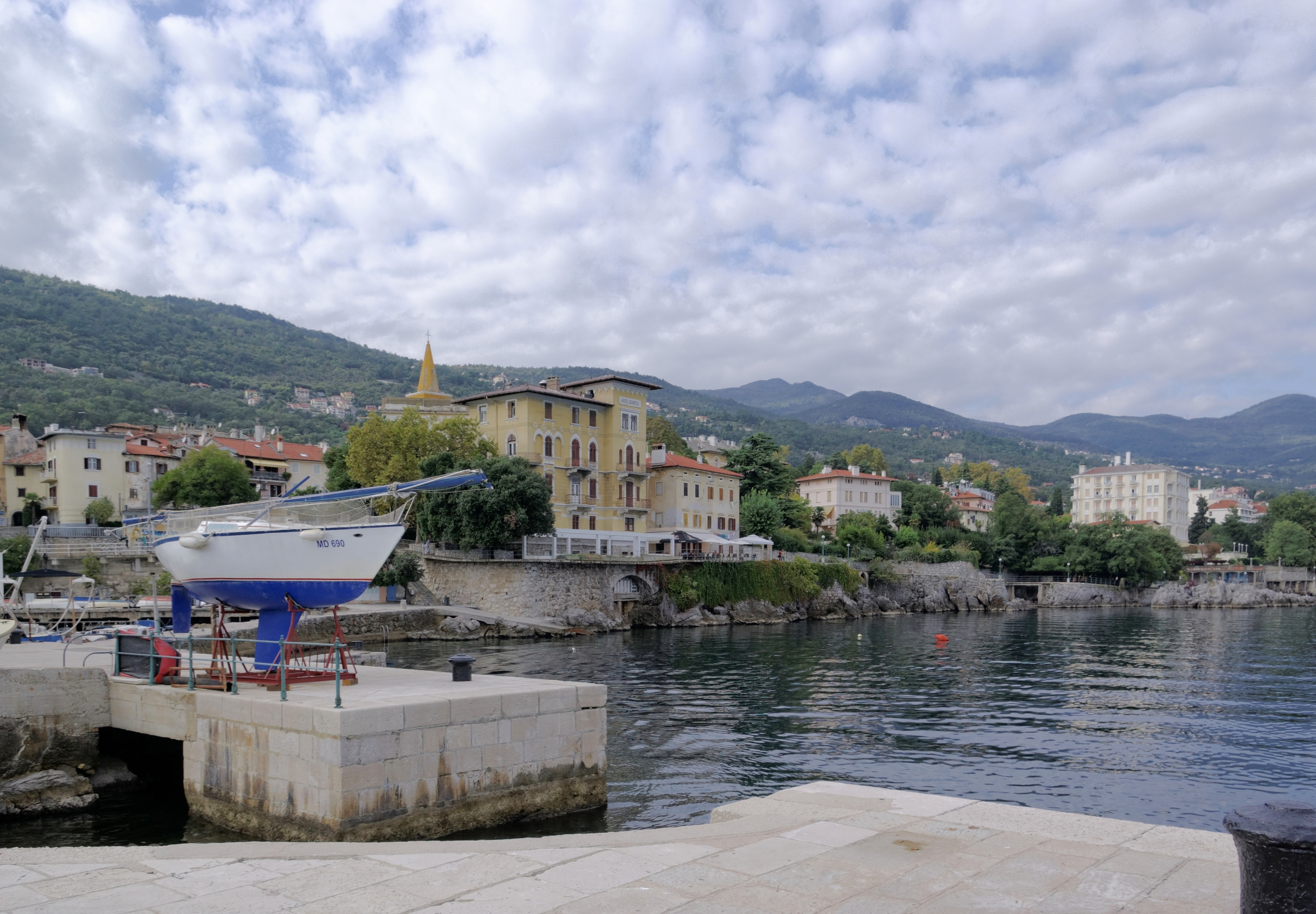
- Lovran

- Flag

- Location within Croatia
- Coordinates: 45.292°N 14.274°E
- Country: Croatia
- County: Primorje-Gorski Kotar County

Government
  - Mayor: Bojan Simonič (AM)
  - City Council: 13 members: AM-HNS-LIST (5); _; SDP-HSU-PGS-HSS (5); _; Independents (1); _; HDZ (1); _; IDS (1)

Area
  - Municipality: 20.3 km^{2} (7.8 sq mi)
  - Urban: 1.9 km^{2} (0.73 sq mi)

Population (2021)
  - Municipality: 3,527
  - Density: 174/km^{2} (450/sq mi)
  - Urban: 2,859
  - Urban density: 1,500/km^{2} (3,900/sq mi)
- Time zone: UTC+1 (CET)
  - Summer (DST): UTC+2 (CEST)
- Area code: 051
- Website: lovran.hr

Lovran (Italian: Laurana, German: Lauran) is a village and a municipality in Primorje-Gorski Kotar County, west Croatia. It is situated in eastern Istria, on the western coast of the Kvarner Bay. Its name derives from Laurel (Laurus nobilis), as shown in the coat of arms.

== Population ==
In the 2011 census, it had a population of 4,101, in the following settlements:

- Liganj, population 336
- Lovran, population 3,336
- Lovranska Draga, population 50
- Medveja, population 177
- Tuliševica, population 202

== History ==
Lovran is one of the oldest coastal settlements on the eastern shore of Istrian peninsula. According to one legend, the town was created when the Roman patrician and statesman Marcus Vipsanius Agrippa built his summer residence on the site in the first century AD. The name of the settlement was first mentioned in the 7th century, as Lauriana, which reveals that the place was named after the aromatic laurel. By the early Middle Ages it was an important urban and shipbuilding center of the northern Adriatic. Following the sudden development of port towns in the vicinity (Trieste, Pula, and Rijeka) which became the new and dominant urban centers in the region, Lovran lost its significance.

However, by the mid 19th century, the area gains prominence as it becomes a fashionable resort for the Austro-Hungarian nobility. The long tradition of tourism is still strongly felt in the Lovran region, and it forms the backbone of the economy.

The region is rich with cultural-historical heritage. A parish church with medieval frescoes and Glagolitic inscriptions, and the 14th-century tower of St George's Square within the old urban core, as well as rural ambiances and architectural edifices – namely turn-of-the-century villas with surrounding parks, are general points of interest.

== Sister cities ==
- Castel San Pietro Terme, Italy
- Codroipo, Italy
- Ravenna, Italy
- Nova Gorica, Slovenia

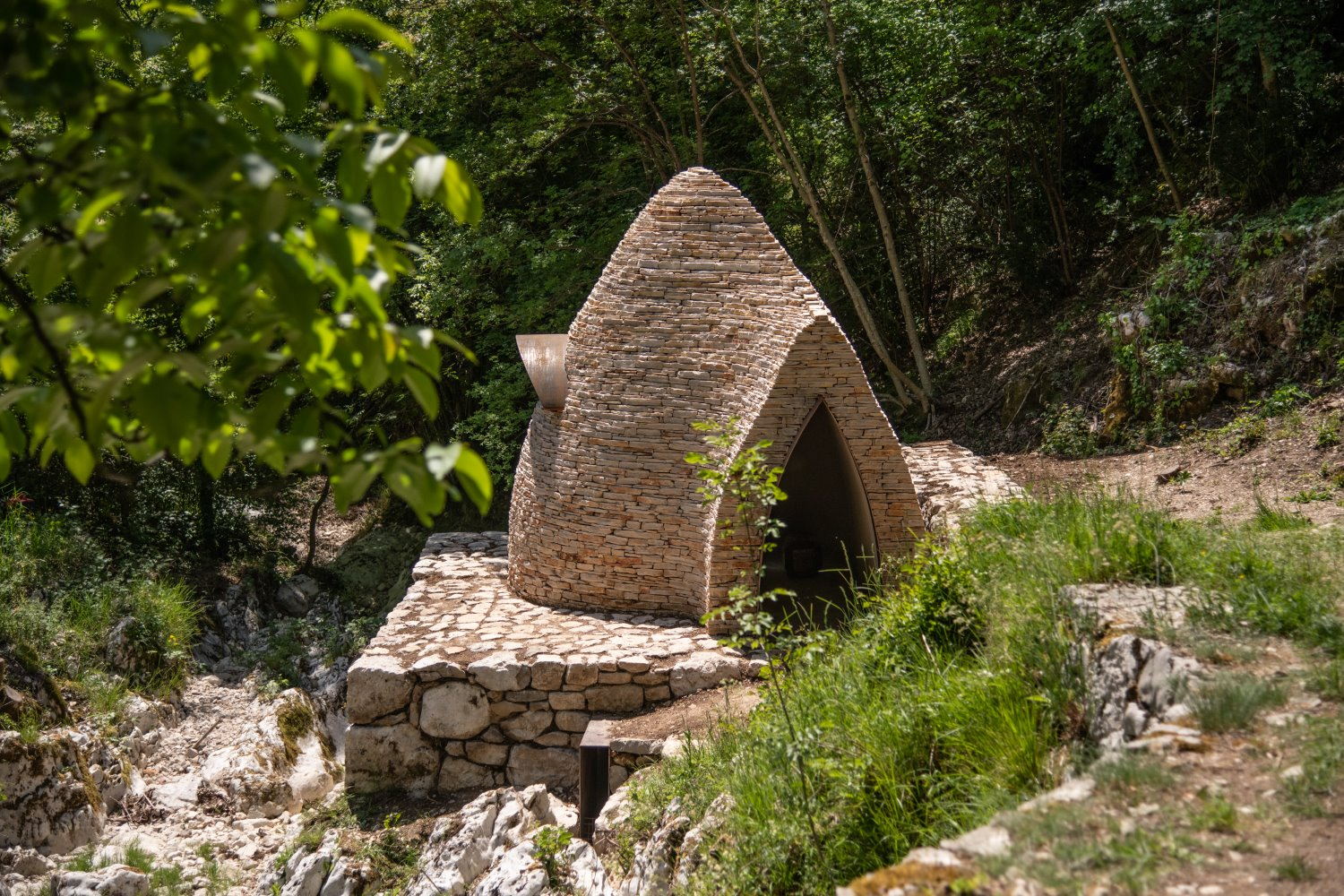
Art installation "Puli Mȁlina" (By the Mill)

== Monuments and sights ==
=== Art installation "Puli Mȁlina" (By the Mill) ===
"Puli Mȁlina" (By the Mill), a site-specific art pavilion by artist Davor Sanvincenti was built on the renovated remains of the old mill along the hiking trail in Lovranska Draga. The pavilion is made from natural materials from the immediate surroundings – from chestnut wood, known as “marun”, and from local stone. The concept of the pavilion is based on the idea of creating a space which, through the processes of integration into the already existing environment of Lovranska Draga, becomes a place of meeting and rest, i.e. a natural shelter and a place of learning about the peculiarities of this area. Due to the specific position of the south window, visitors have the opportunity to experience unusual interplay of sunbeams and water on the spring and fall equinox.

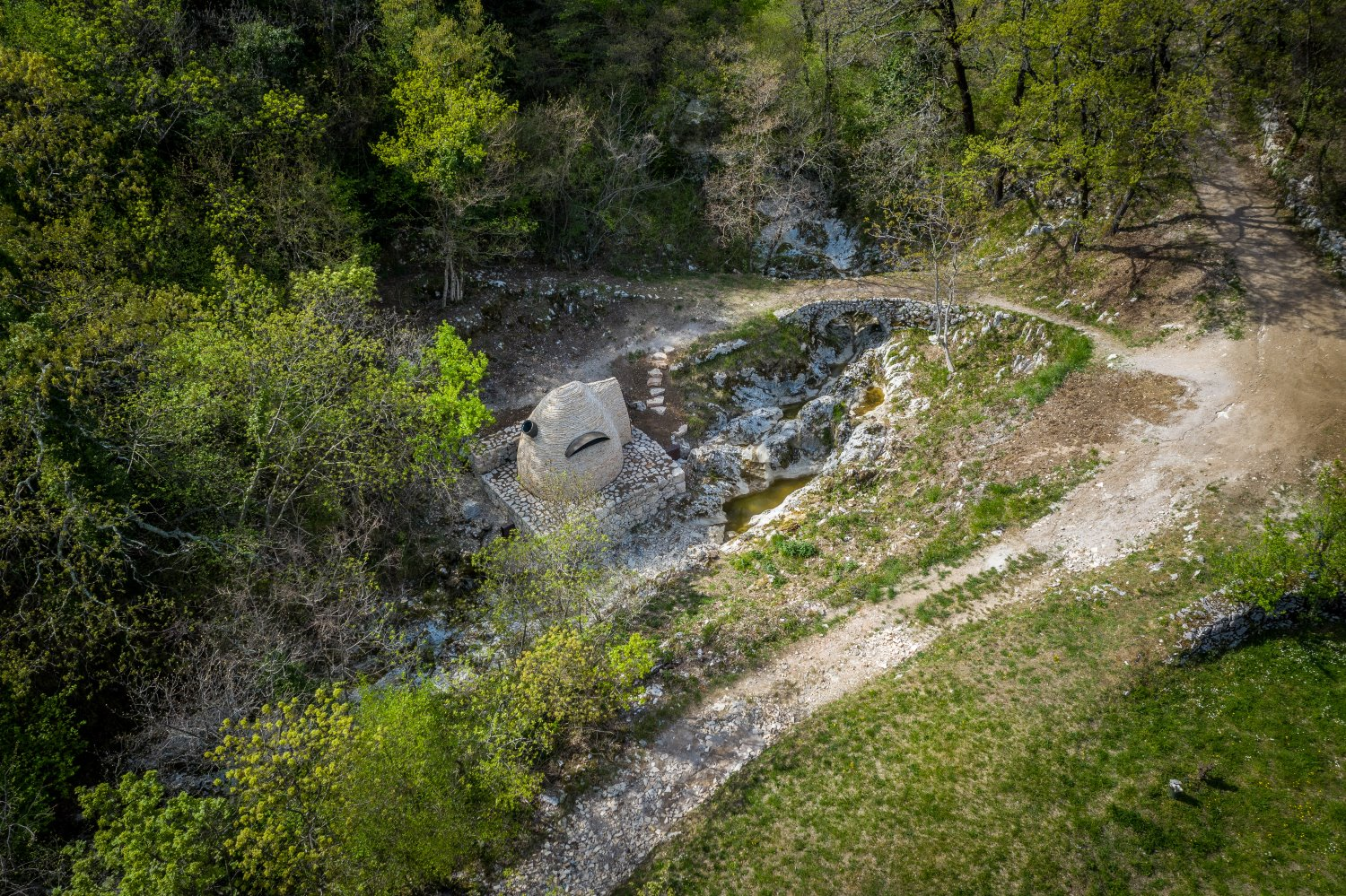
Drone image of "Puli Mȁlina"
