= Merag =

- Village
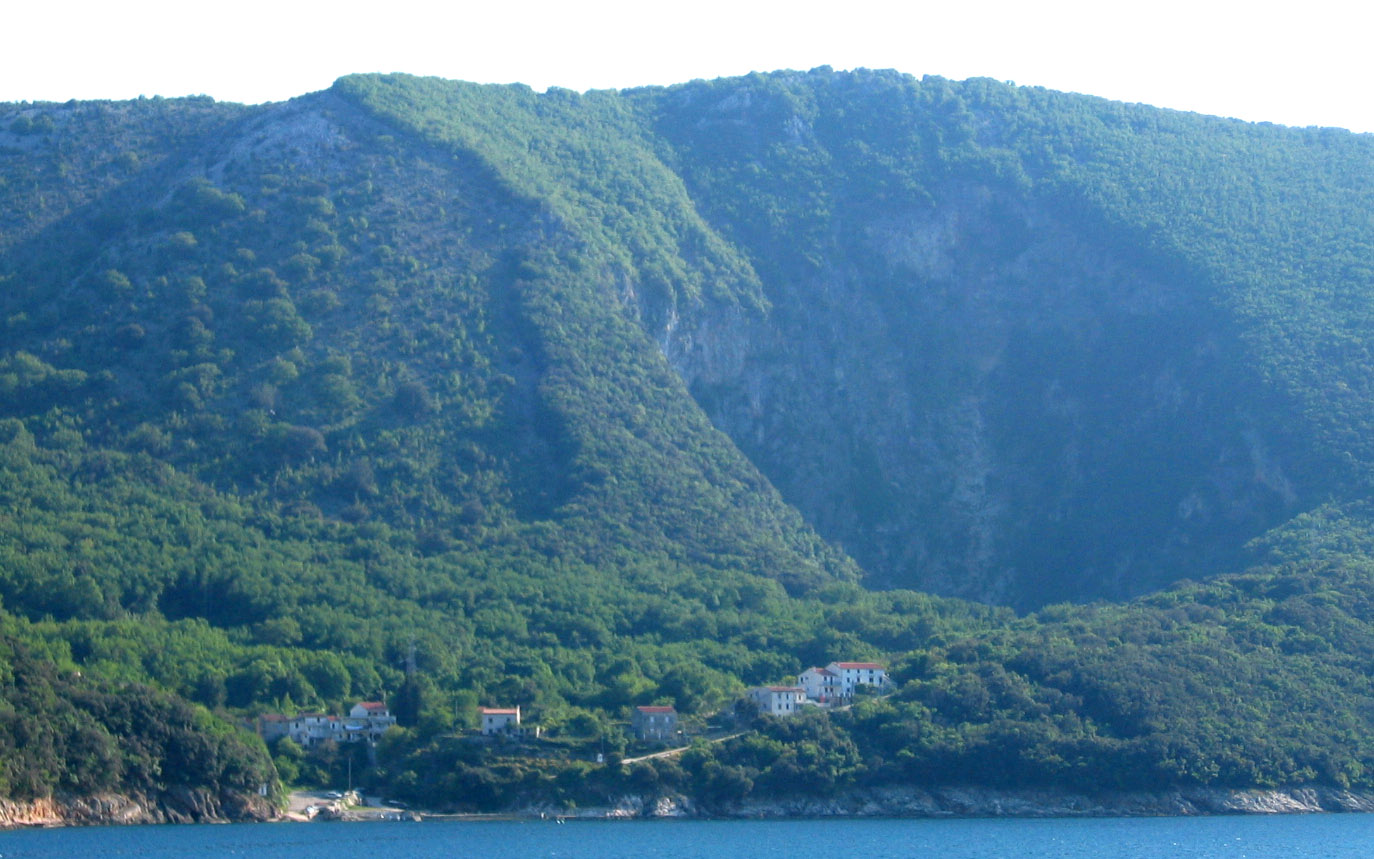

- Location within Croatia
- Coordinates: 44°58′33″N 14°26′36″E
- Country: Croatia

Area
  - Total: 17.3 km^{2} (6.7 sq mi)

Population (2021)
  - Total: 22
  - Density: 1.3/km^{2} (3.3/sq mi)
- Time zone: UTC+1 (CET)
  - Summer (DST): UTC+2 (CEST)

Merag is a village in Croatia, located on the east coast of Cres. It is connected by ferry to Valbiska on Krk and is accessed via the D101 road which is connected to the D100 road, the main road on the island of Cres. The village has a population of 10.

== Gallery ==
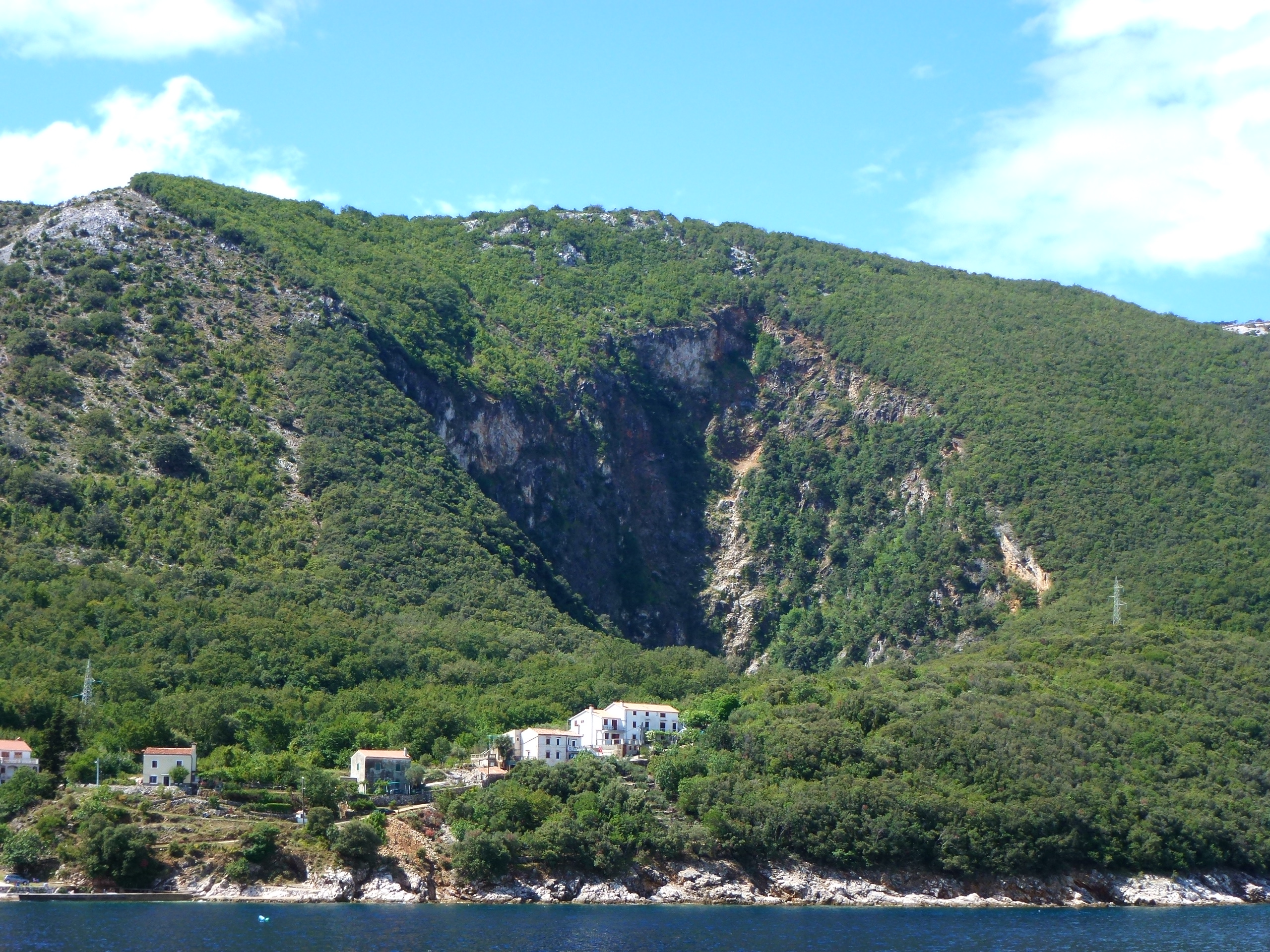
Meraška jama collapse doline

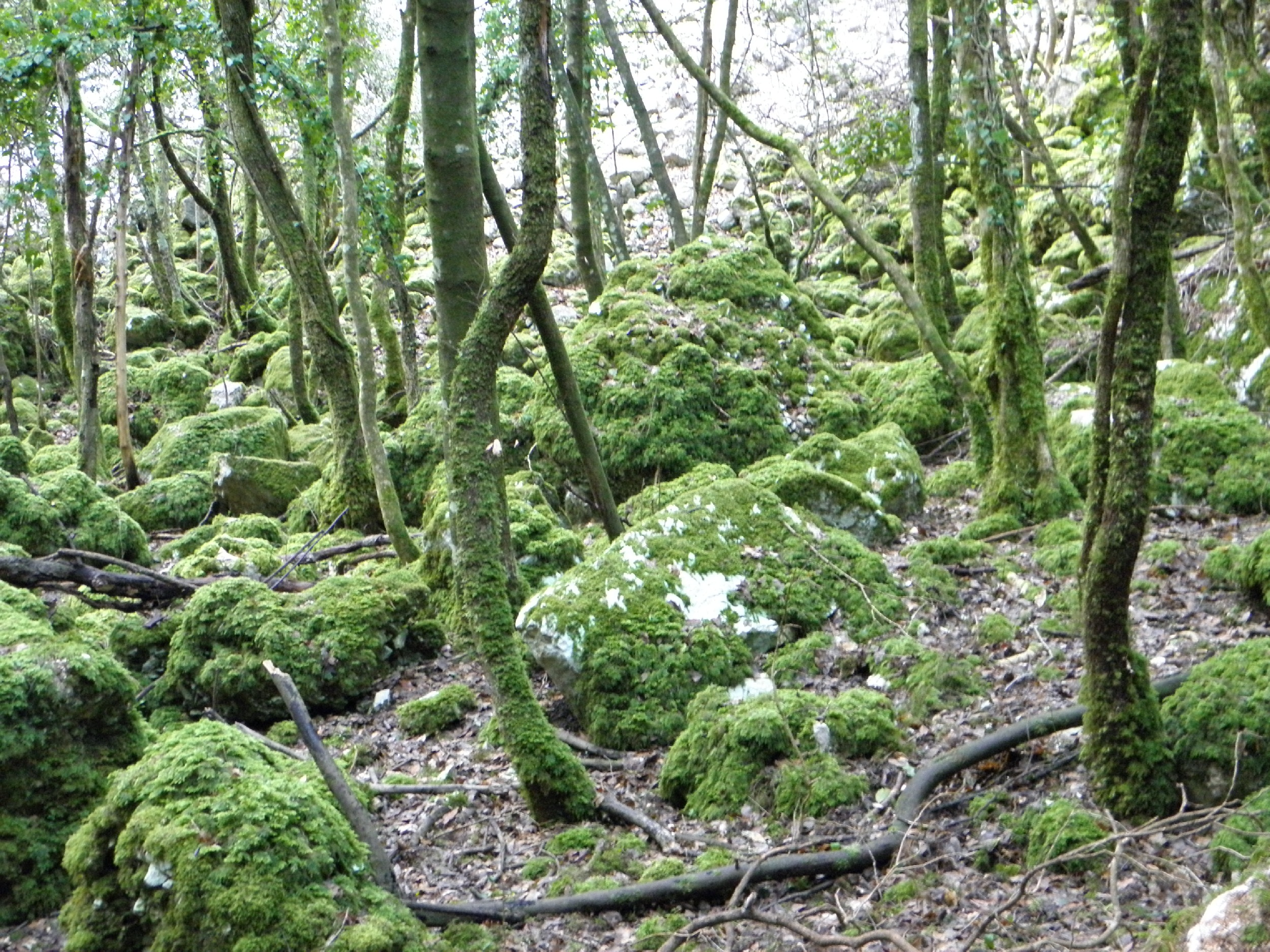
Doline forest

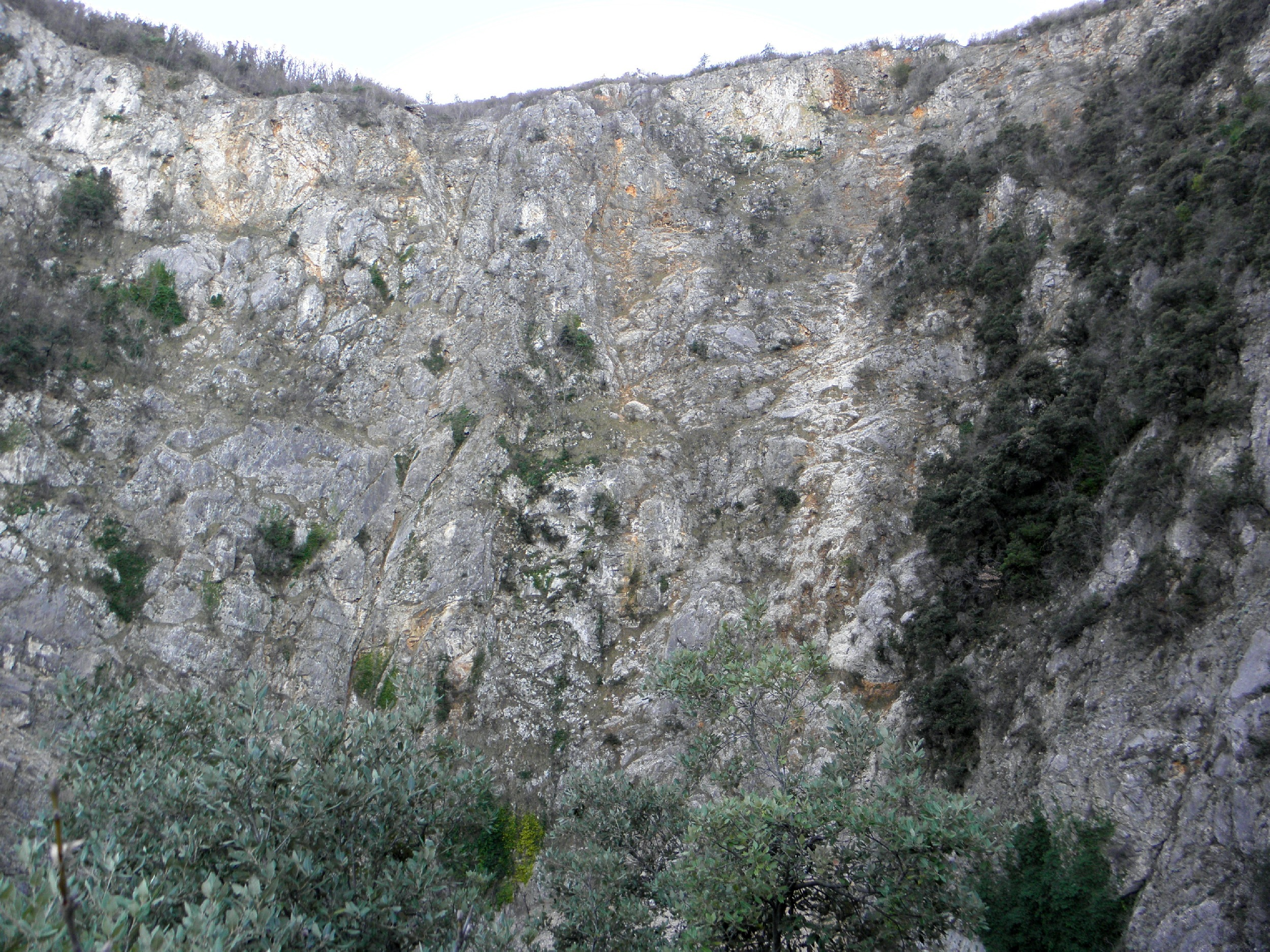
Cliffs

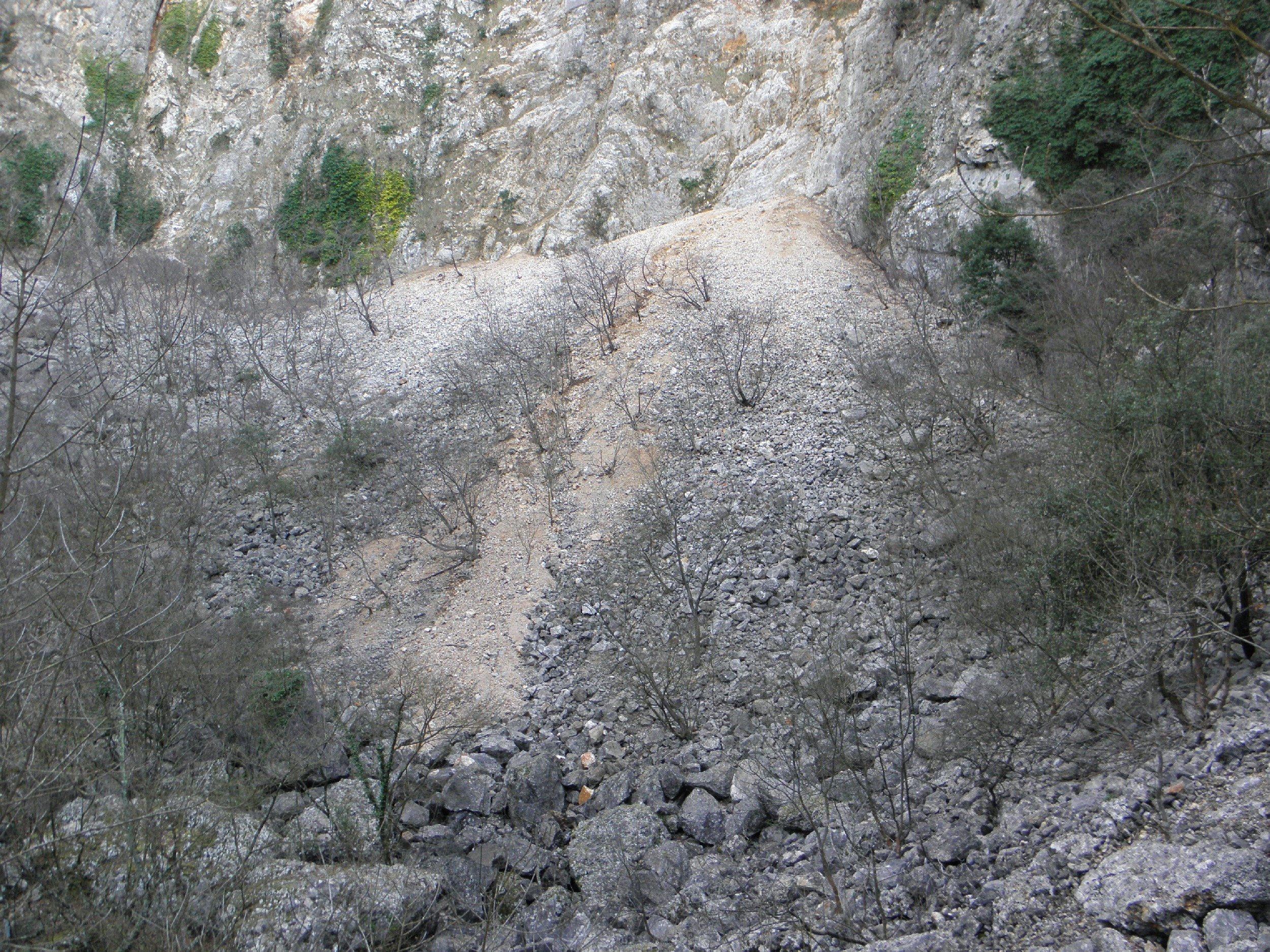
Scree

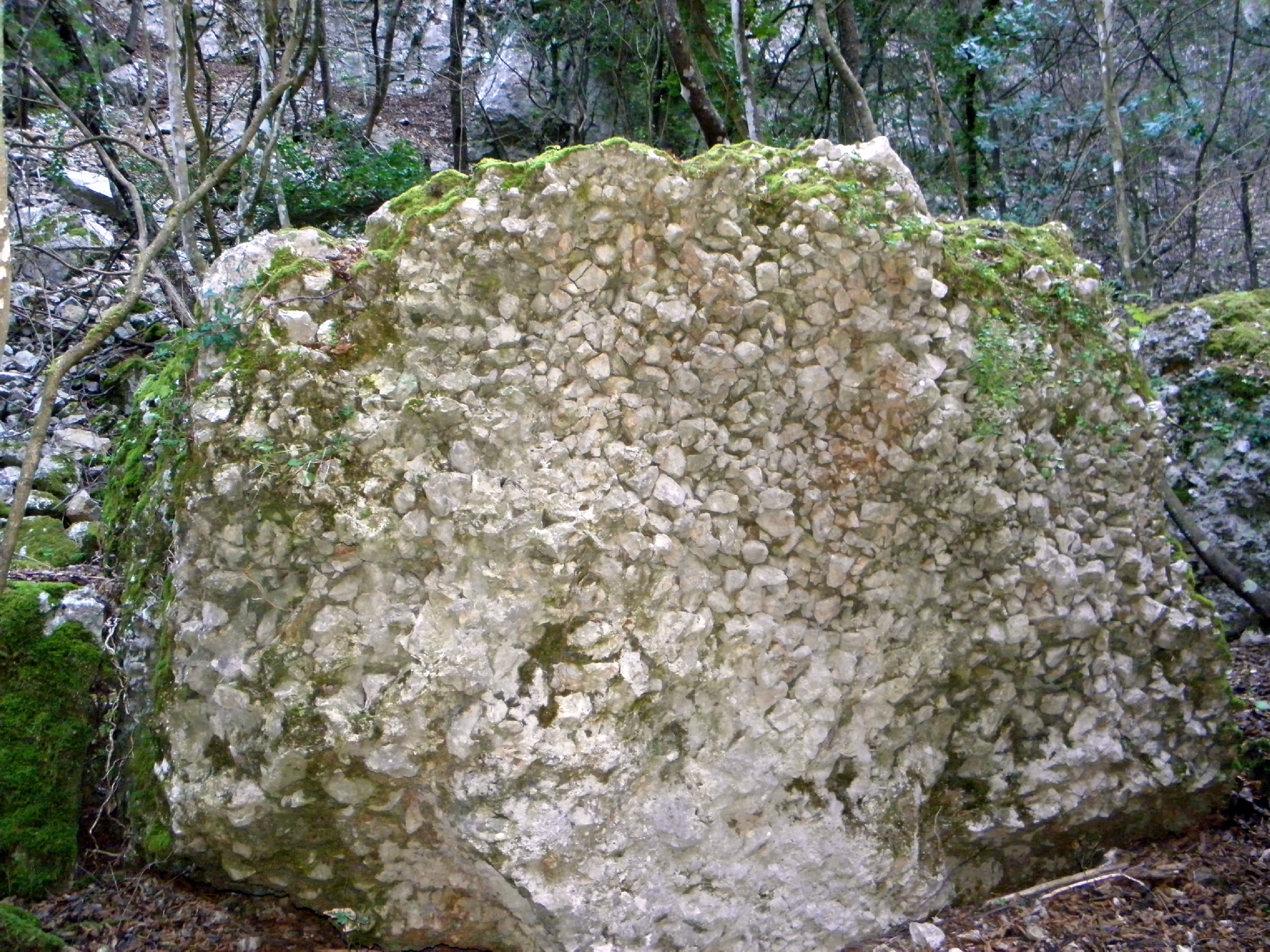
Boulder (breccia)

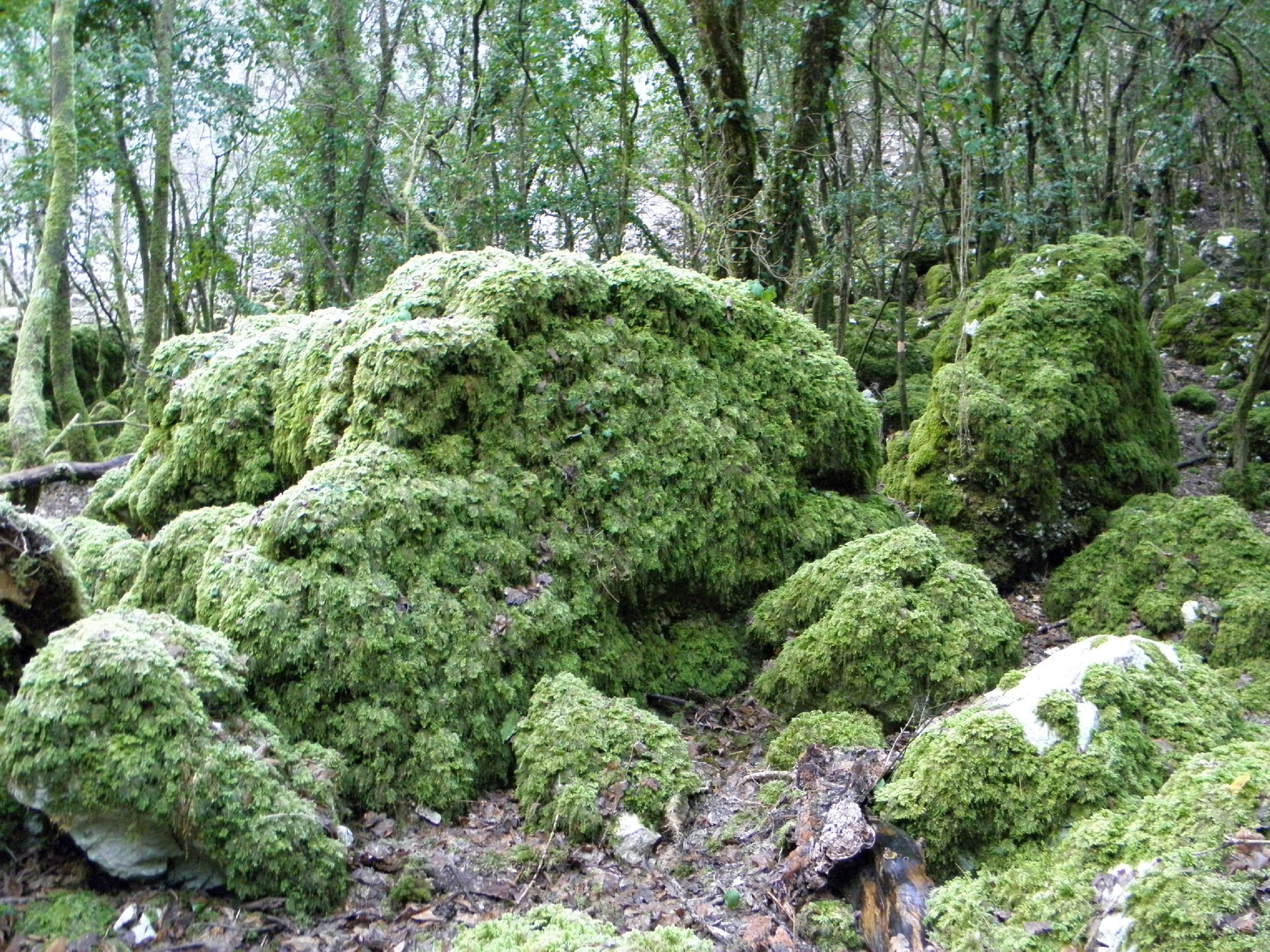
Boulder (mossy)

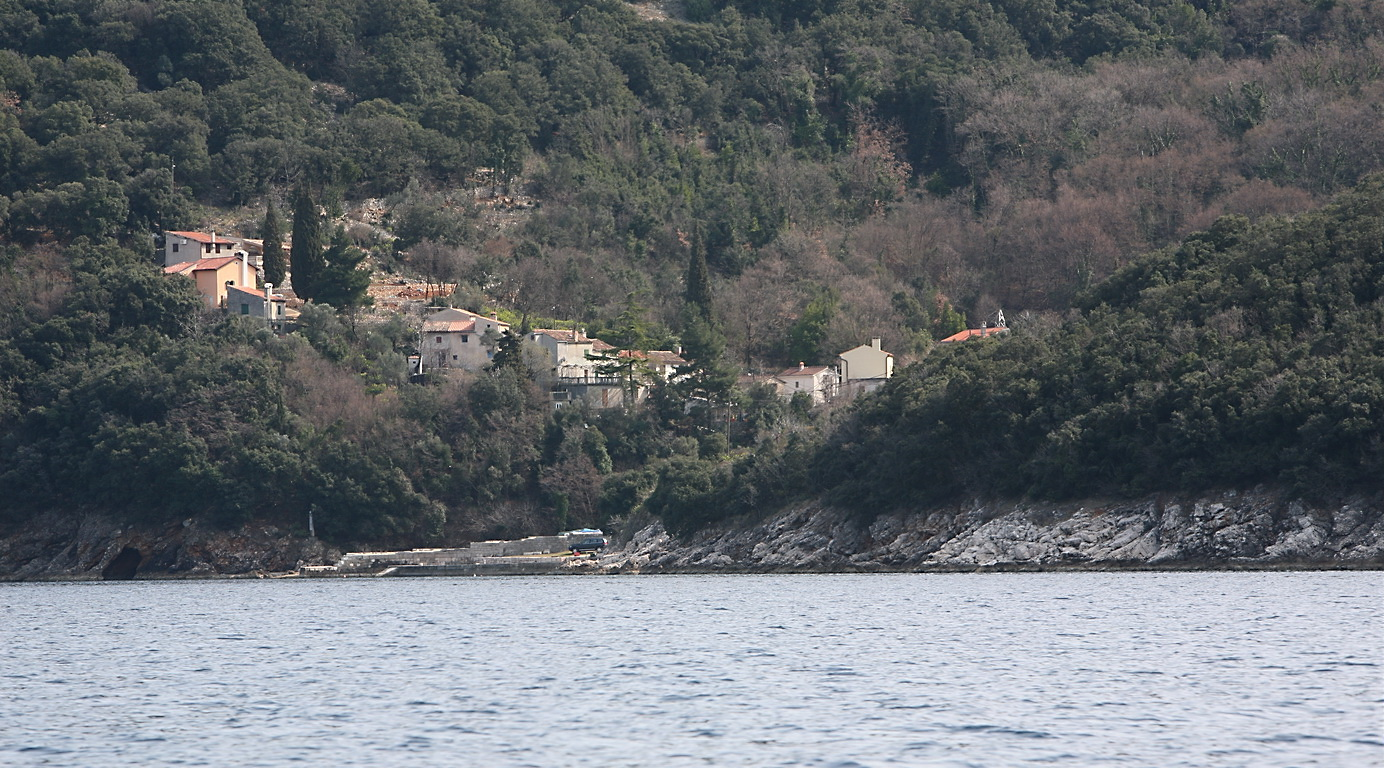
Merag village

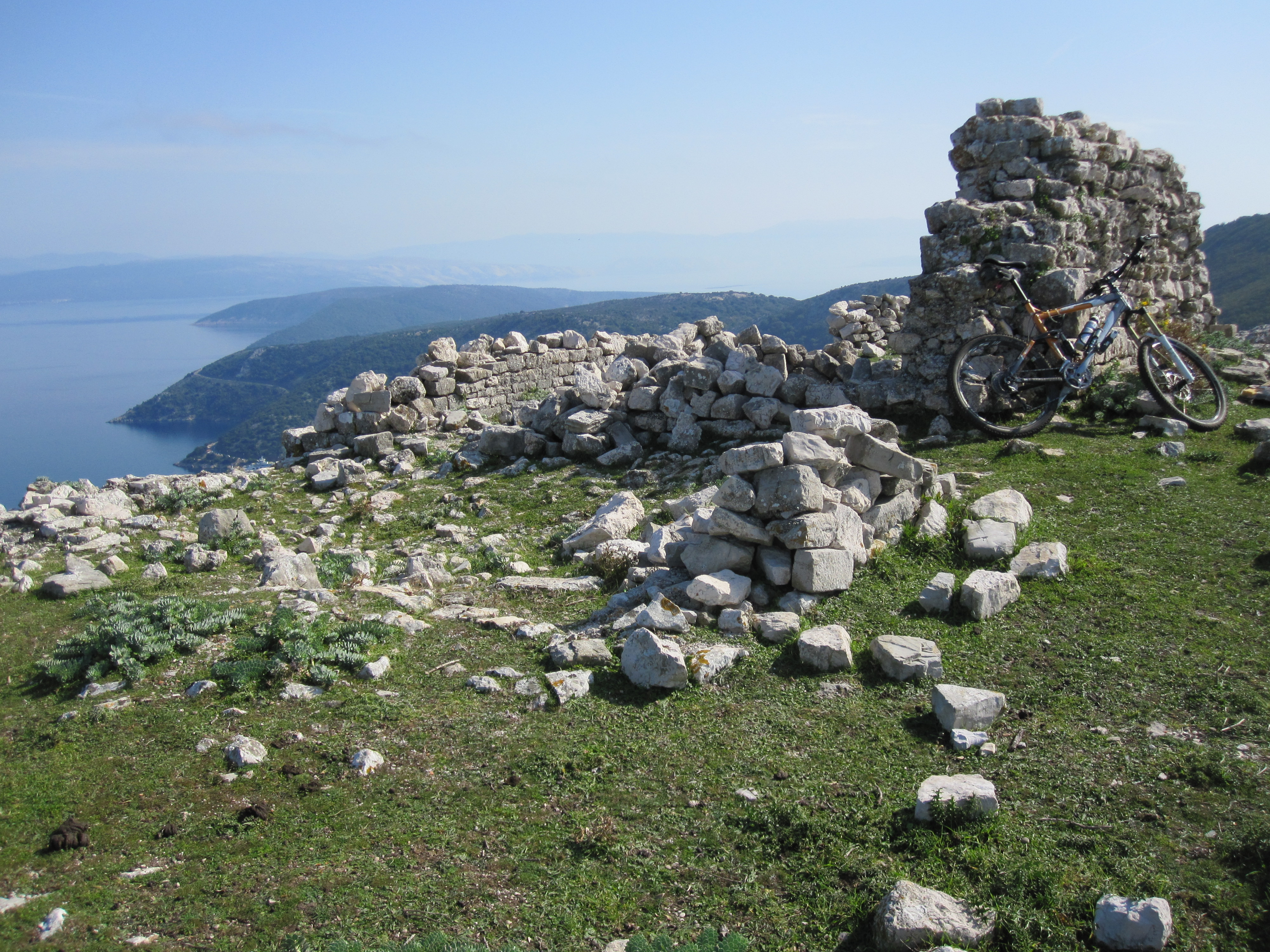
Sv. Bartolomeja church ruins
