= Bršica =

Bršica Pesacco
- Village
- Country: Croatia
- County: Istria County
- Time zone: UTC+1 (CET)
  - Summer (DST): UTC+2 (CEST)

Bršica (Italian: Pesacco) is a port village in Croatia. It is connected by the D421 state road and by ferry. 50km away by sea, or 100km by road, there is a Port of Rijeka terminal which handles livestock, timber and general cargo.
