= Medveja, Croatia =

Medveja
- Village
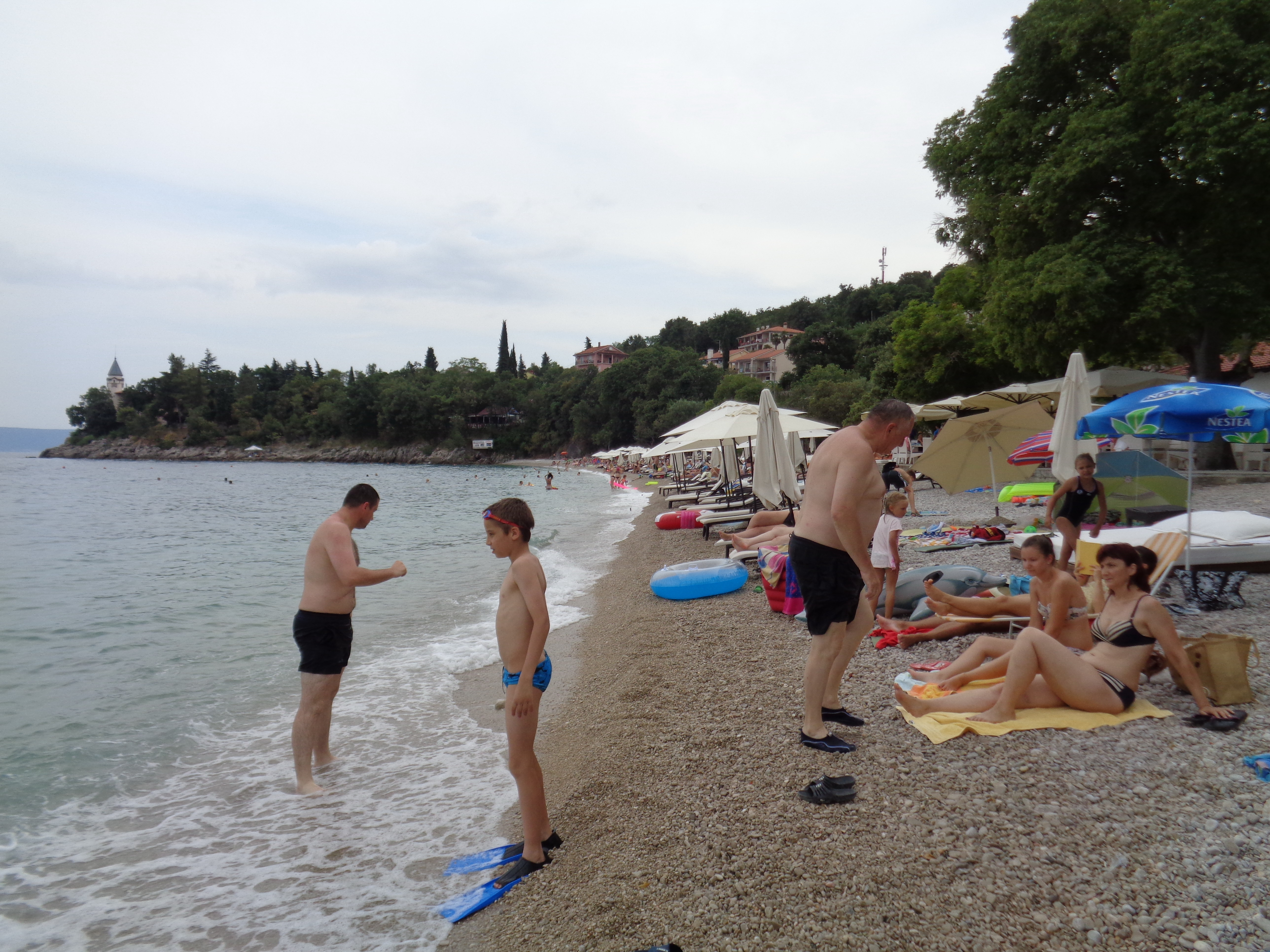
- Beach in Medveja

- Location within Croatia
- Coordinates: 45°16′N 14°16′E
- Country: Croatia
- County: Primorje-Gorski Kotar County
- Municipality: Lovran

Area
  - Total: 2.4 km^{2} (0.93 sq mi)

Population (2021)
  - Total: 139
  - Density: 58/km^{2} (150/sq mi)
- Time zone: UTC+1 (CET)
  - Summer (DST): UTC+2 (CEST)

Medveja is a village in Lovran municipality, Primorje-Gorski Kotar County, in Croatia. It is connected by the D66 highway. Medveja is a former picturesque coastal fishing village, located 3 kilometers from the center of Lovran.

== History ==
The village's popular tavern Špajza burned down in the morning of one day in late June 2019 and the fire threatened to spread across the D66 to a neighbouring object, but the fire department JVP Opatija and volunteer fire department DVD Lovran stopped it.
