= Lošinj Airport =

Lošinj Airport Sport Airport Lošinj
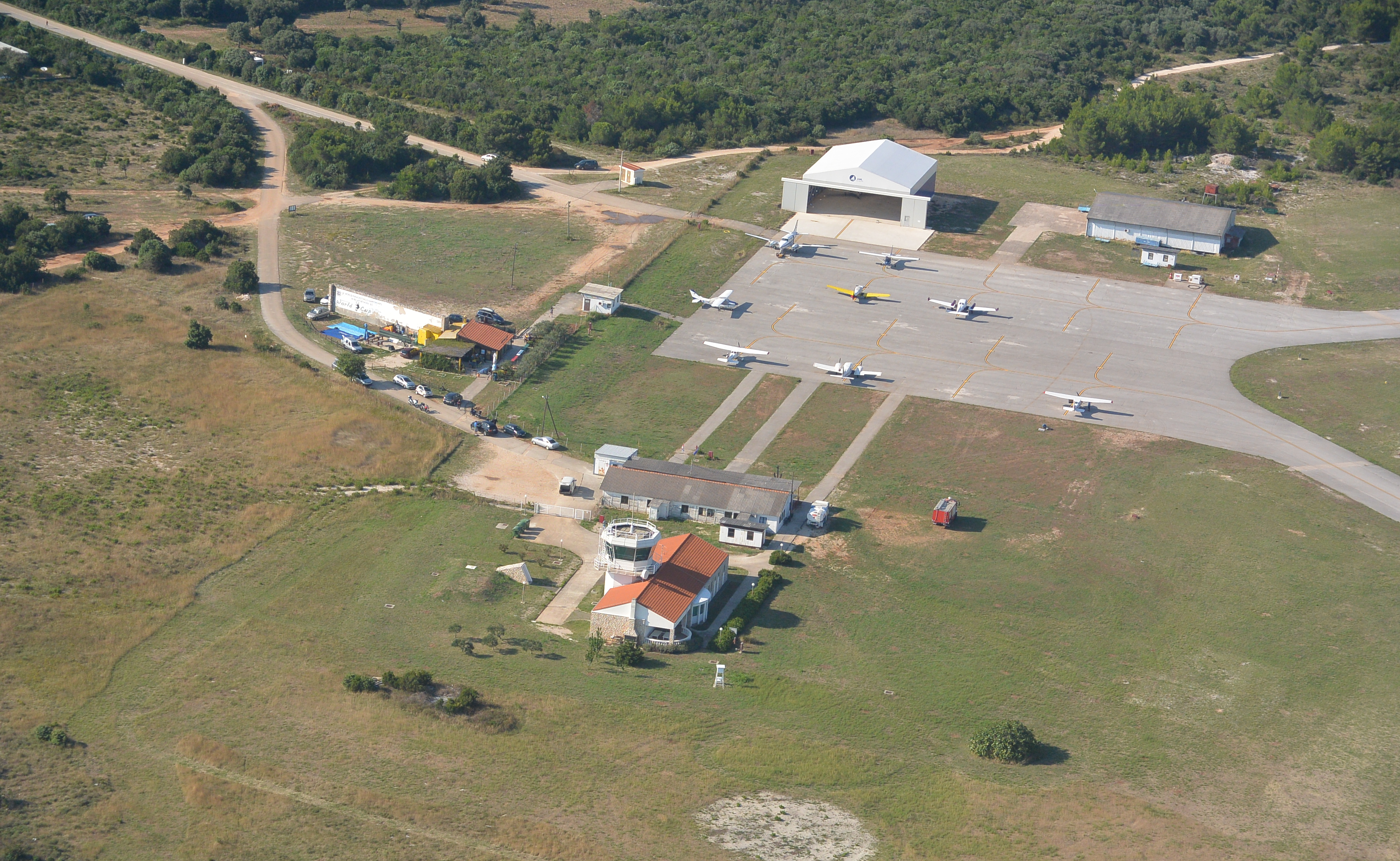
- IATA: LSZ; ICAO: LDLO

Summary
- Airport type: Public
- Operator: Lošinj Airport Ltd.
- Serves: Lošinj, Croatia
- Location: Mali Lošinj
- Elevation AMSL: 154 ft / 47 m
- Coordinates: 44°33′57″N 14°23′35″E
- Website: www.airportmalilosinj.hr

Map
- Location of the airport in Croatia

Runways
Direction	Length		Surface
Direction	m	ft	Surface
02/20	900	2,953	Asphalt
- Croatian Aeronautical Information Publication

Lošinj Airport (IATA: LSZ, ICAO: LDLO) is a privately owned public airport 3.2 nautical miles (5.9 km) from Mali Lošinj on the island of Lošinj, Croatia. It is registered for domestic and international traffic.

It is one of five island airports in the country (the most notable being Krk island's Rijeka Airport and Brač Airport on the eponymous island).

== Overview ==
The runway is 900 m long and 30 m wide, and is equipped with 1C signalization, according to the ICAO. A non-precision instrument approach using an NDB located near the city is published. The runway and taxiways are paved with asphalt. Two taxiways are positioned at 45° from the runway.

The traffic consists primarily of small aircraft. It was built as a general aviation airport for air sports in 1985 when Croatia was still part of Yugoslavia.

== Airlines and destinations ==
As of February 2021, there are no regular flights scheduled. The sole remaining seasonal route by Silver Air to Lugano is not scheduled for resumption in the wake of the COVID-19 pandemic.

== Statistics ==
Traffic at Lošinj Airport
Year	Passengers
2011	1,597
2012	794
2013	0
2014	0
2015	12,287
2016	6,402
2017	6,042
2018	6,939
2019	6,495
2020	3,214
