= Pinezići =

- Village
- Location of Pinezići in Croatia Pinezići (Croatia)
- Coordinates: 45°02′N 14°28′E
- Country: Croatia
- County: Primorje-Gorski Kotar
- Island: Krk

Area
  - Total: 9.0 km^{2} (3.5 sq mi)

Population (2021)
  - Total: 258
  - Density: 29/km^{2} (74/sq mi)
- Time zone: UTC+1 (CET)
  - Summer (DST): UTC+2 (CEST)
- Postal code: 51500
- Area code: 051
- Vehicle registration: RI

Pinezići is a village on the island of Krk, Croatia. It is situated in the western part of the island, 9km from the city of Krk. Nearby Pinezići is Valbiska, a ferry port that operates ferries to Lopar on Rab and Merag on Cres.

== Population ==
According to the last census of 2011, there were 196 inhabitants in Pinezići. This is an increase from 134 inhabitants from the 2001 census.

== Governance ==
=== Local ===
It is the seat of the Local Committee of Skrpčić-Pinezić, encompassing itself and Skrbčići.

== Economy ==
Residents of Pinezići are mainly engaged in farming, fishing, and more recently tourism. The main beach is situated in the bay "Jert".
