= Nerezine =

Village in Primorje-Gorski Kotar, Croatia

Nerezine Nerèsine
- Village
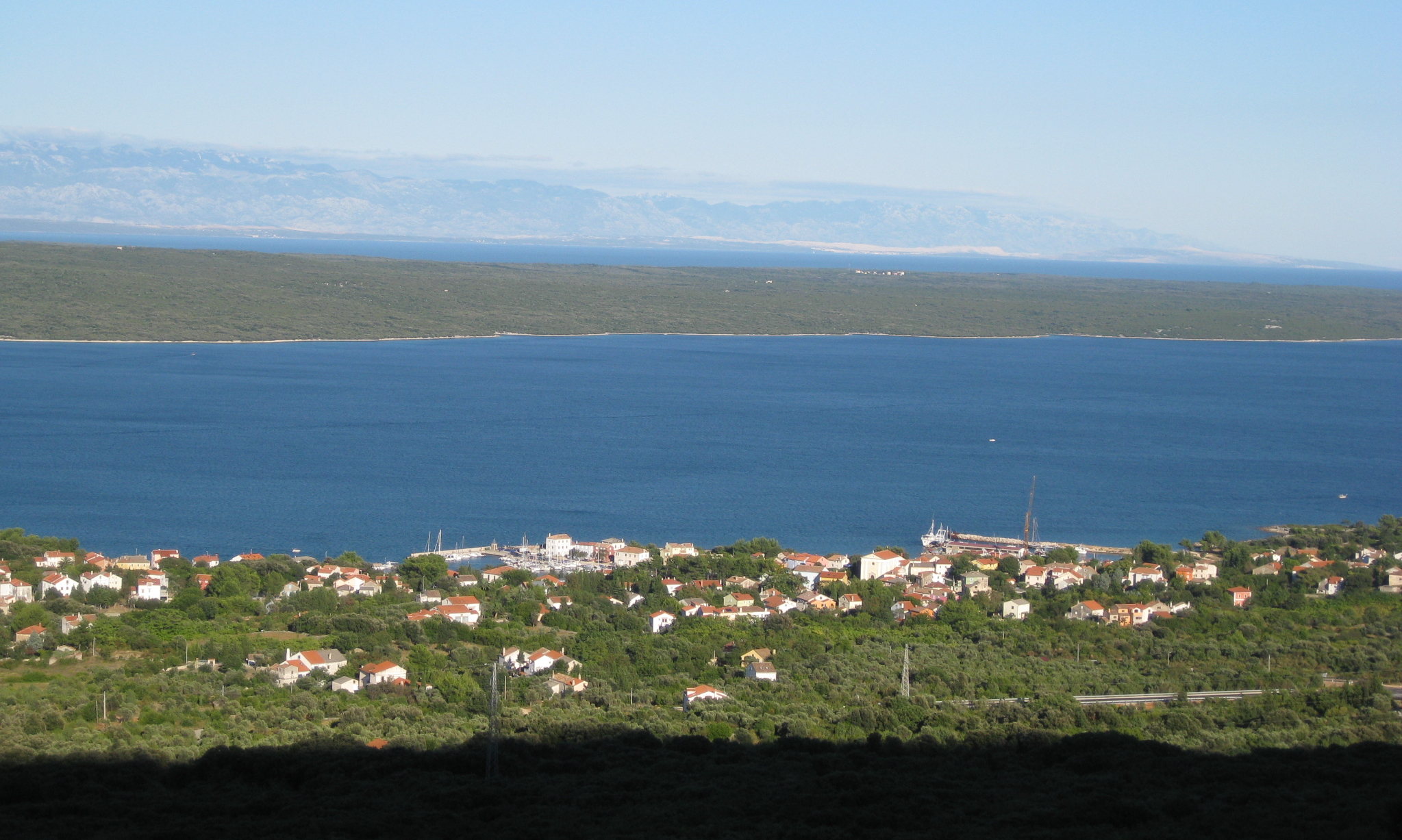
- View of Nerezine

- Location within Croatia
- Coordinates: 44.65790°N 14.39770°E
- Country: Croatia
- County: Primorje-Gorski Kotar
- Town: Mali Lošinj

Area
  - Total: 31.4 km^{2} (12.1 sq mi)

Population (2021)
  - Total: 397
  - Density: 12.6/km^{2} (32.7/sq mi)
- Time zone: UTC+1 (CET)
  - Summer (DST): UTC+2 (CEST)
- Postal code: 51554
- Area code: 051
- Vehicle registration: RI

Nerezine (Italian: Nerèsine) is a fishing village on the Croatian island of Losinj, in Primorje-Gorski Kotar county. Administratively, it is part of the town of Mali Lošinj. As of 2021, it had a population of 397. It has many historic houses. The first time it was mentioned was in the 14th century. The town has a significant Italian speaking population with many residents reporting it as a native language. Visitors have reported hearing Italian on Nerezine’s streets, as well as using it to communicate with locals.
