= Brestova =

- Village
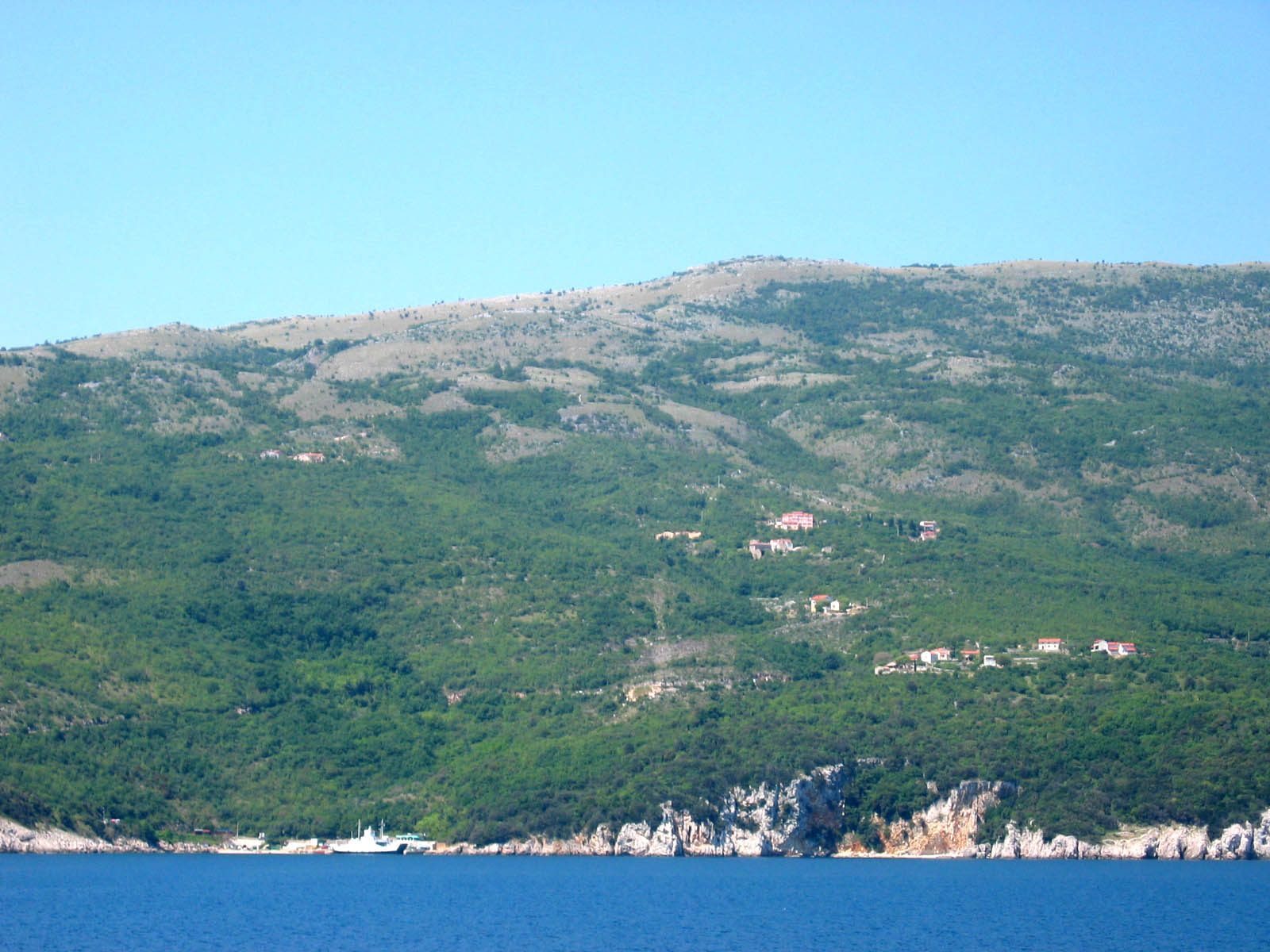
- Brestova ferry port

- Location within Croatia
- Coordinates: 45.144546°N 14.223733°E
- Country: Croatia
- County: Istria County
- Municipality: Kršan

Population (2021)
  - Total: 0
- Time zone: UTC+1 (CET)
  - Summer (DST): UTC+2 (CEST)
- Postal code: 52234
- Area code: 052

Brestova is a village in Croatia, located south of Učka Mountain ridge. It is connected by the D402 road, which links the Brestova ferry port, from where ferries depart for the island of Cres. The settlement is administered as a part of Istria County and Kršan municipality.
