= Porozina =

Porozina Faresina
- Village
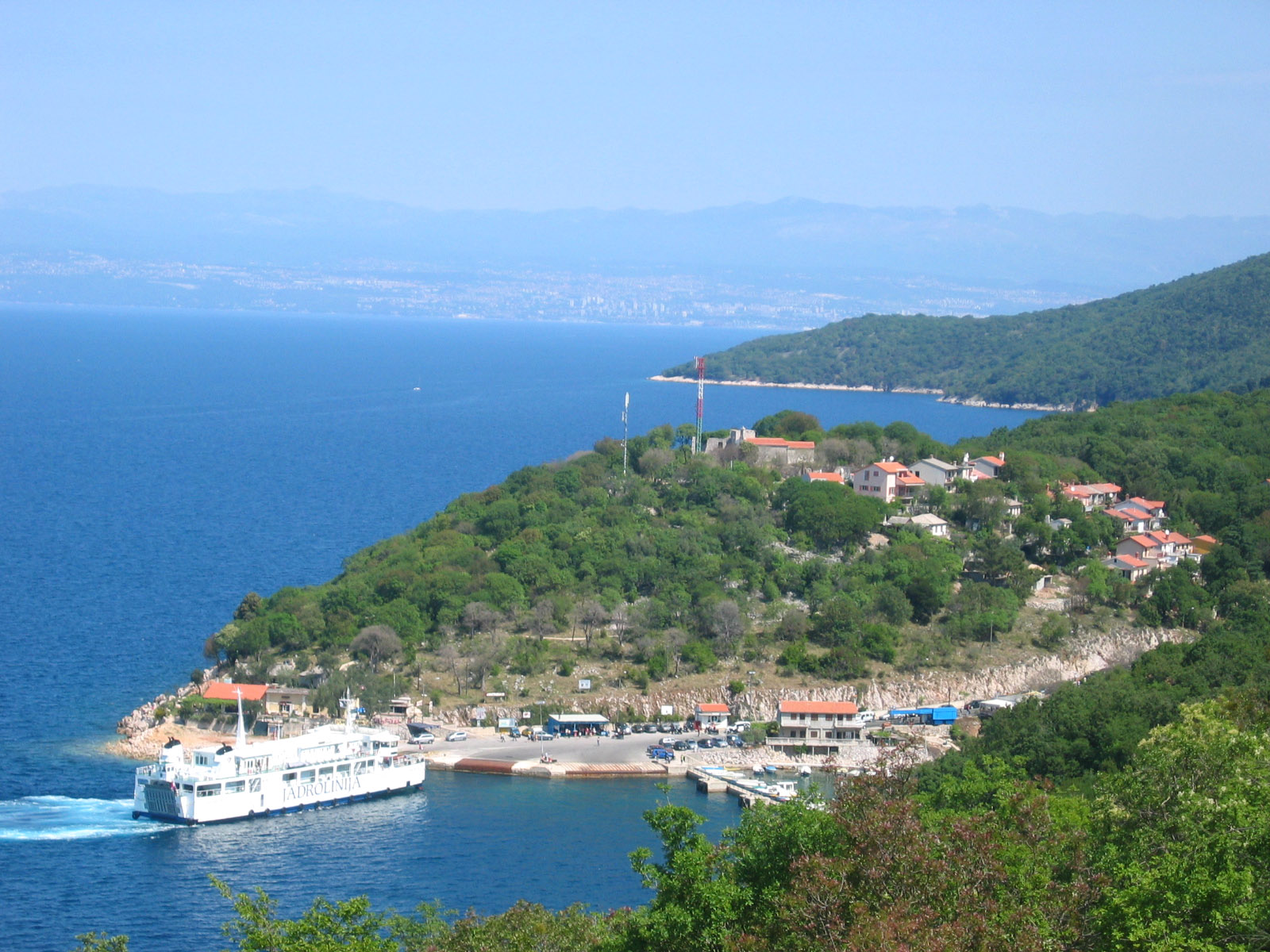
- Port of Porozina

- Location within Croatia
- Coordinates: 45.13229°N 14.28718°E
- Country: Croatia
- County: Primorje-Gorski Kotar
- Town: Cres

Area
  - Total: 1.5 km^{2} (0.58 sq mi)

Population (2021)
  - Total: 28
  - Density: 19/km^{2} (48/sq mi)
- Time zone: UTC+1 (CET)
  - Summer (DST): UTC+2 (CEST)
- Postal code: 51557
- Area code: 051
- Vehicle registration: RI

Porozina (Italian: Faresina) is a small port village in Croatia, located on the northwest coast of Cres. Administratively, it is part of the town of Cres. As of 2021, it had a population of 28. It is connected by ferry to Brestova (Kršan municipality) on the Istria mainland.

The old town is situated upon a hillock above the port, and in the last two decades, a new holiday neighbourhood has been built.

== History ==
In the Classical era there was a lighthouse on the hillock above the port, that is how the town got its name (Pharum insulae).

On this site today we find ruins of an old Franciscan monastery of Saint Nicholas and an ancient Gothic church (45.1327°N 14.2864°E), dating to the 15th century (not long before 1465). The monastery was used by Franciscan Glagolitic monks of the third order, who managed to preserve Old Church Slavonic as a liturgy language, even up to the 13th century. The monastery edifice was abandoned in 1843 when it was also partly demolished. Its ruins manifest characteristics of the renaissance architecture.

The church was the victim of many robberies, and it was almost burnt to the ground in the 16th century. Remarkably, it withstood all those perils and stands well-preserved today. Among its many distinct features are Glagolitic inscriptions on its walls.

== Geography ==
The settlement is situated in a cove on the north of the island. The cove offers good natural protection from all the winds, so this spot was the only one suitable for docking from time immemorial.

== Gallery ==
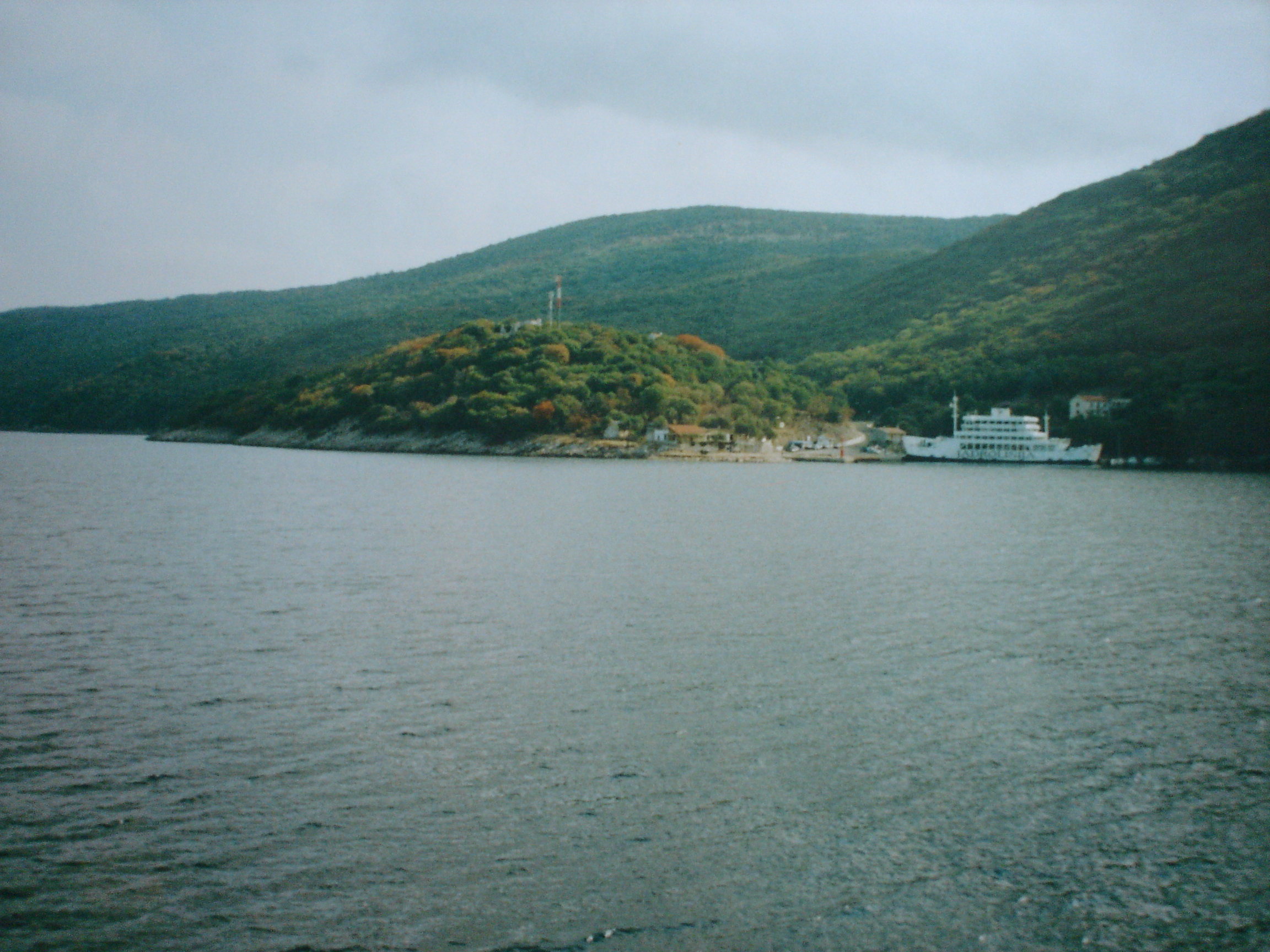
From sea

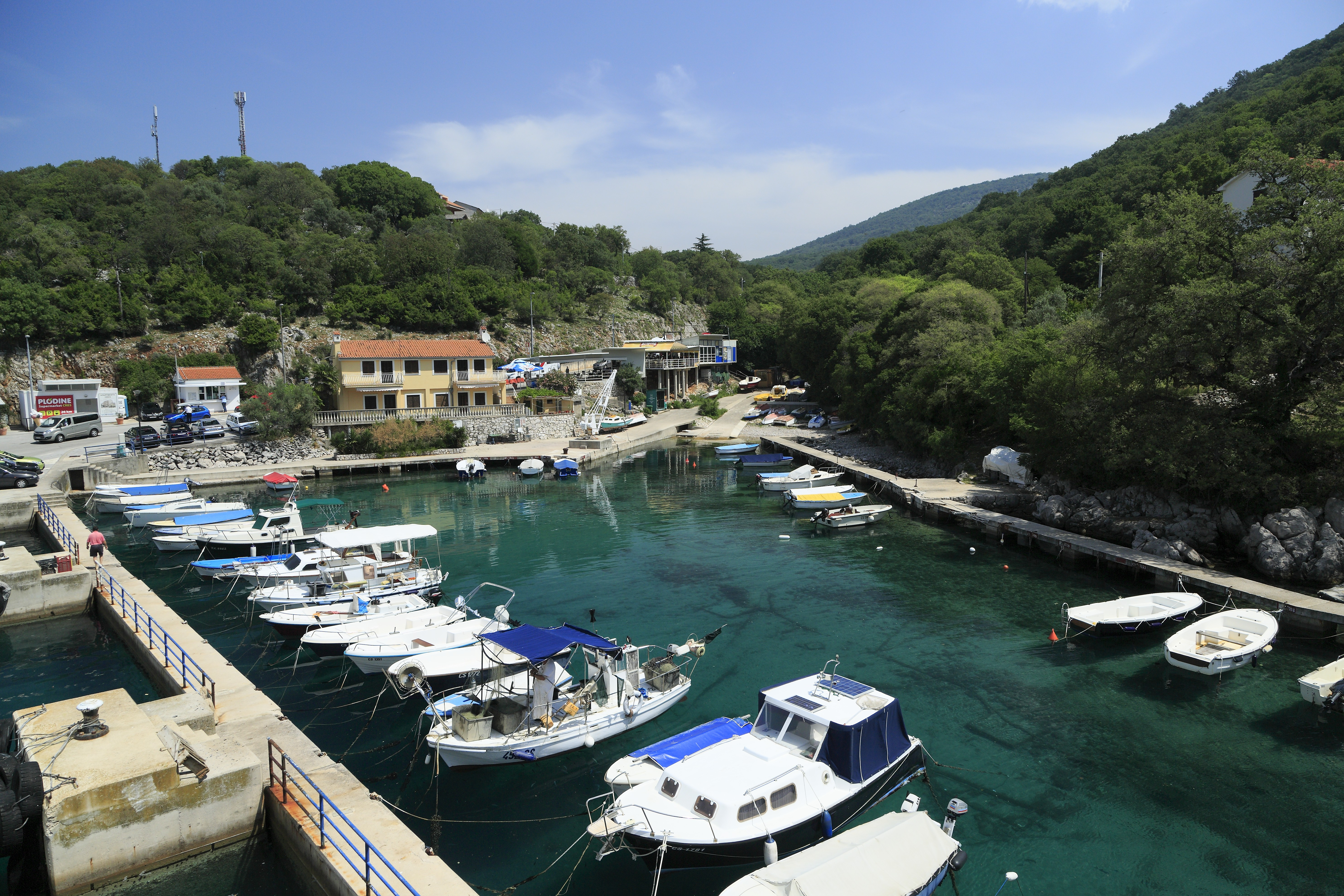
Port
