= Predošćica =

Village in Primorje-Gorski Kotar, Croatia

Predošćica Predoschizza
- Village
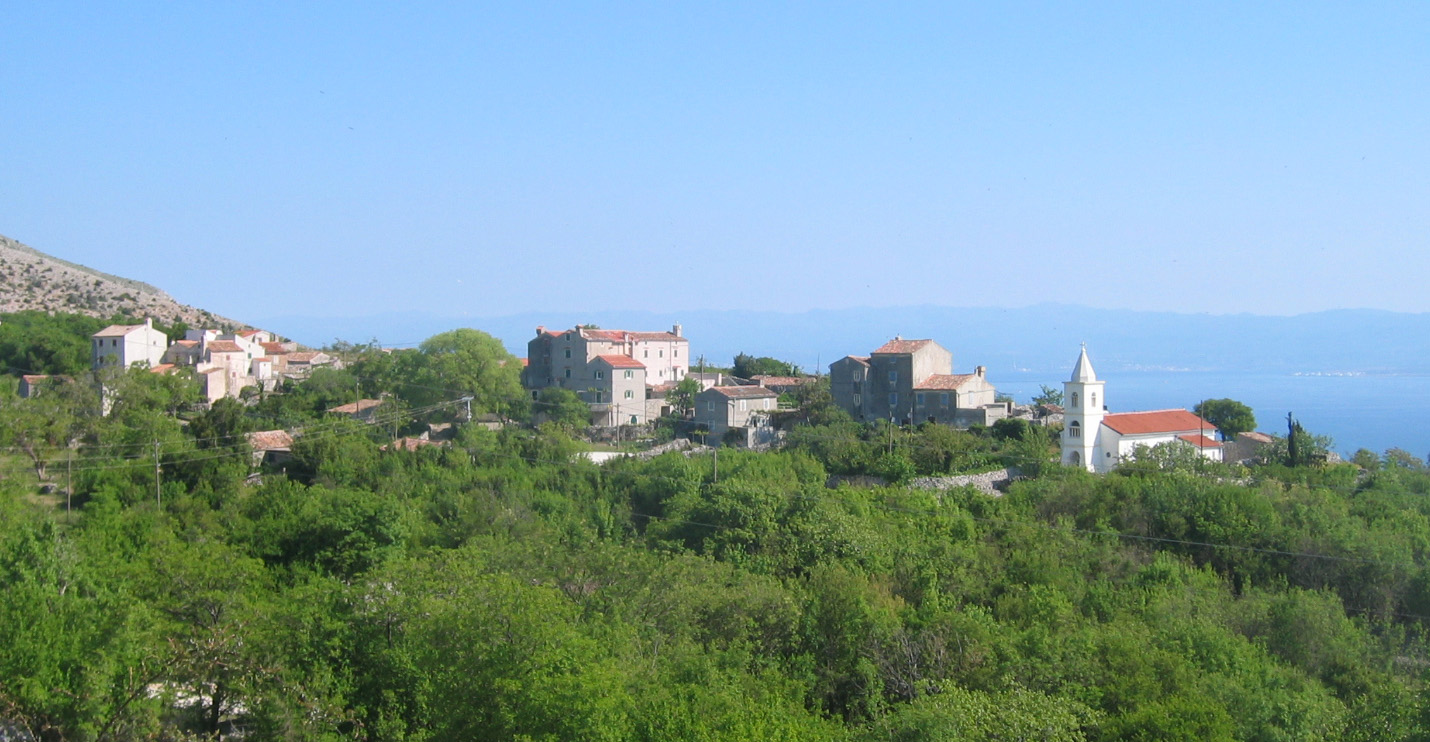
- View of Predošćica

- Location within Croatia
- Coordinates: 45.04175°N 14.37223°E
- Country: Croatia
- County: Primorje-Gorski Kotar
- Town: Cres

Area
  - Total: 7.2 km^{2} (2.8 sq mi)

Population (2021)
  - Total: 1
  - Density: 0.14/km^{2} (0.36/sq mi)
- Time zone: UTC+1 (CET)
  - Summer (DST): UTC+2 (CEST)
- Postal code: 51557
- Area code: 051
- Vehicle registration: RI

Predošćica (Italian: Predoschizza) is a village located on the Croatian island of Cres, in Primorje-Gorski Kotar. Administratively, it is part of the town of Cres. As of 2021, it had a population of 1. A church devoted to Saint Blaise (Note: 45.0410°N 14.3727°E) is situated in the village.

== Gallery ==
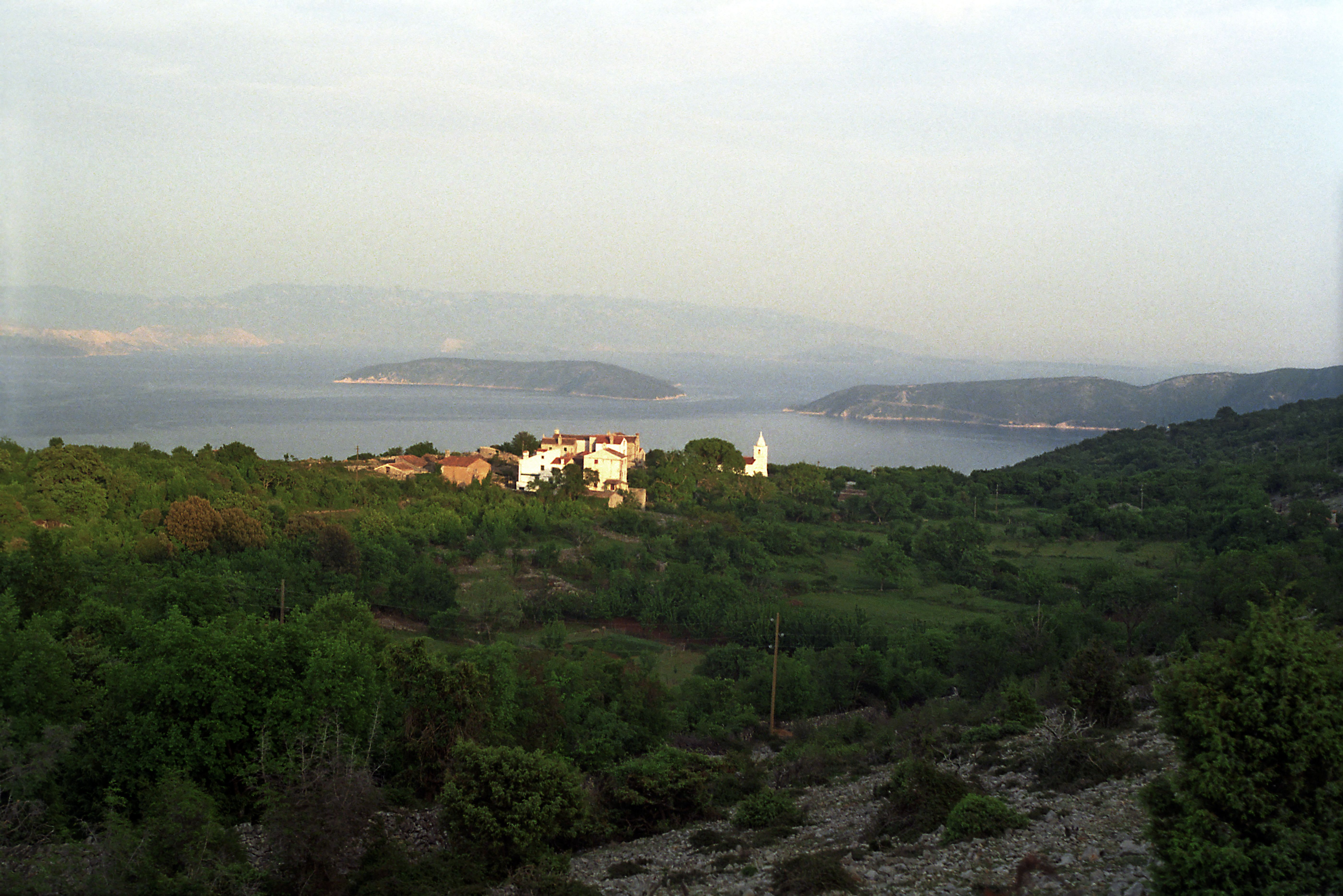
From hill

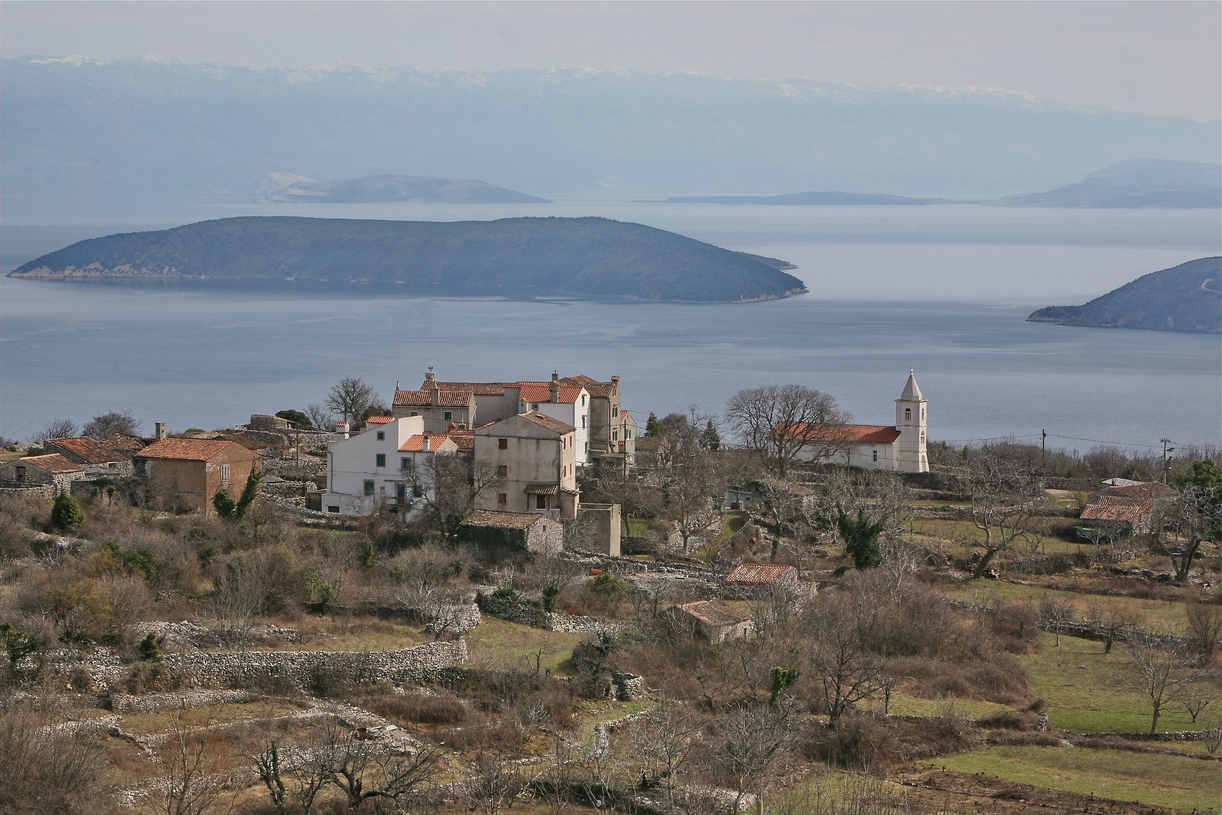
Dry stone walls
