= Sveti Petar, Cres =

Village in Primorje-Gorski Kotar, Croatia

Sveti Petar
- Village
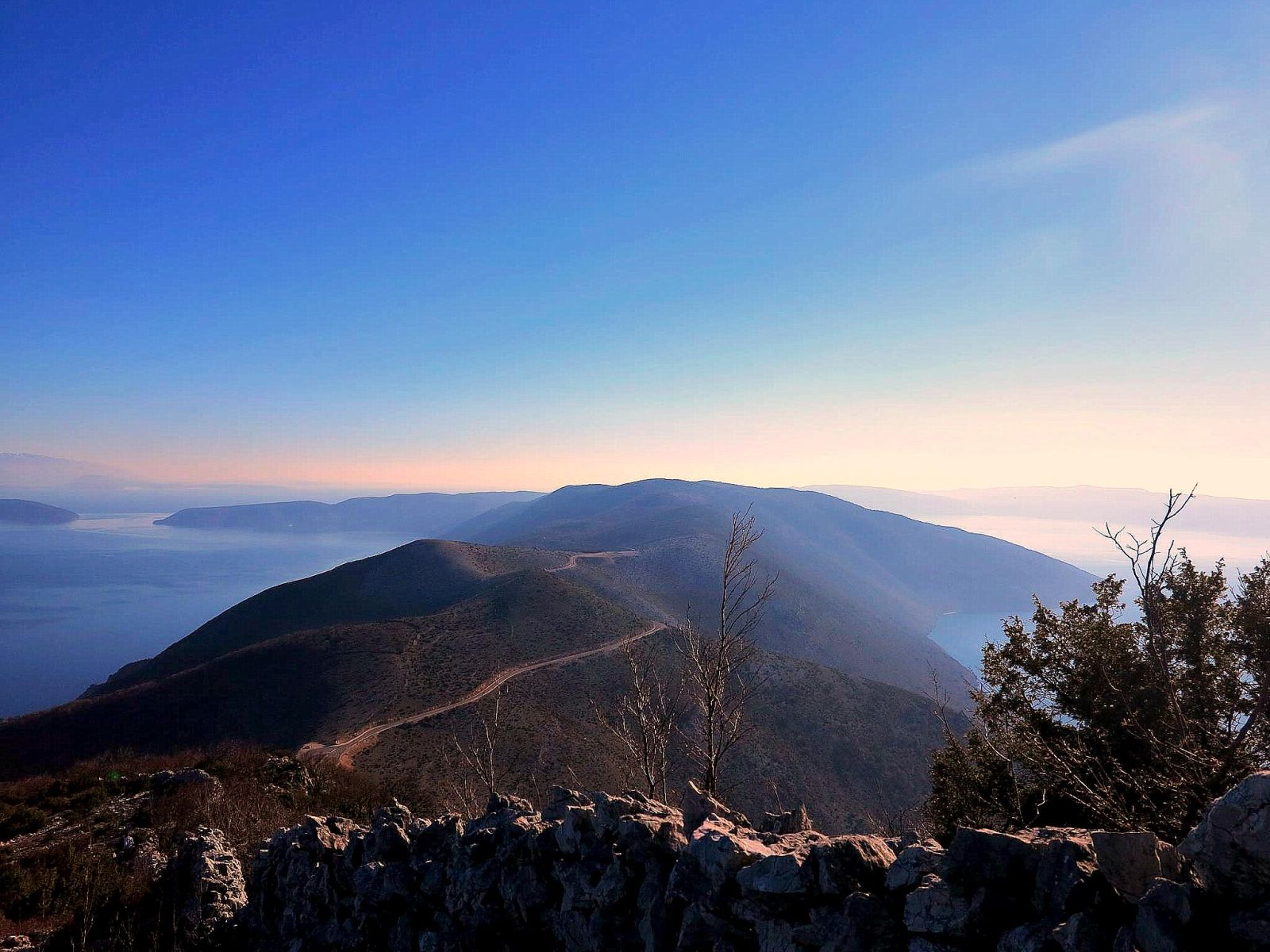
- Landscape near Sveti Petar

- Location within Croatia
- Coordinates: 45.09131°N 14.35325°E
- Country: Croatia
- County: Primorje-Gorski Kotar
- Town: Cres

Area
  - Total: 9.5 km^{2} (3.7 sq mi)

Population (2021)
  - Total: 7
  - Density: 0.74/km^{2} (1.9/sq mi)
- Time zone: UTC+1 (CET)
  - Summer (DST): UTC+2 (CEST)
- Postal code: 51559
- Area code: 051
- Vehicle registration: RI

Sveti Petar (English: Saint Peter) is a village on the Croatian island of Cres, in the Primorje-Gorski Kotar County. Administratively, it is part of the town of Cres. As of 2021, it had a population of 7.

== History ==
An old hollow Quercus pubescens measuring 656 centimeters (222 in) in girth and 15 metres (49ft) in height, by one estimate 400 years old, was designated a protected natural monument in 1997. Both of its remaining branches were broken by a heavy snowfall on April 6, 2021

== Landmarks ==
A church dedicated to Saint Peter (Note: 45.0915°N 14.3533°E) is located in the town, the town's name being derived from the church.
