= Grmov =

Village in Primorje-Gorski Kotar, Croatia

Grmov Ghermonici
- Village
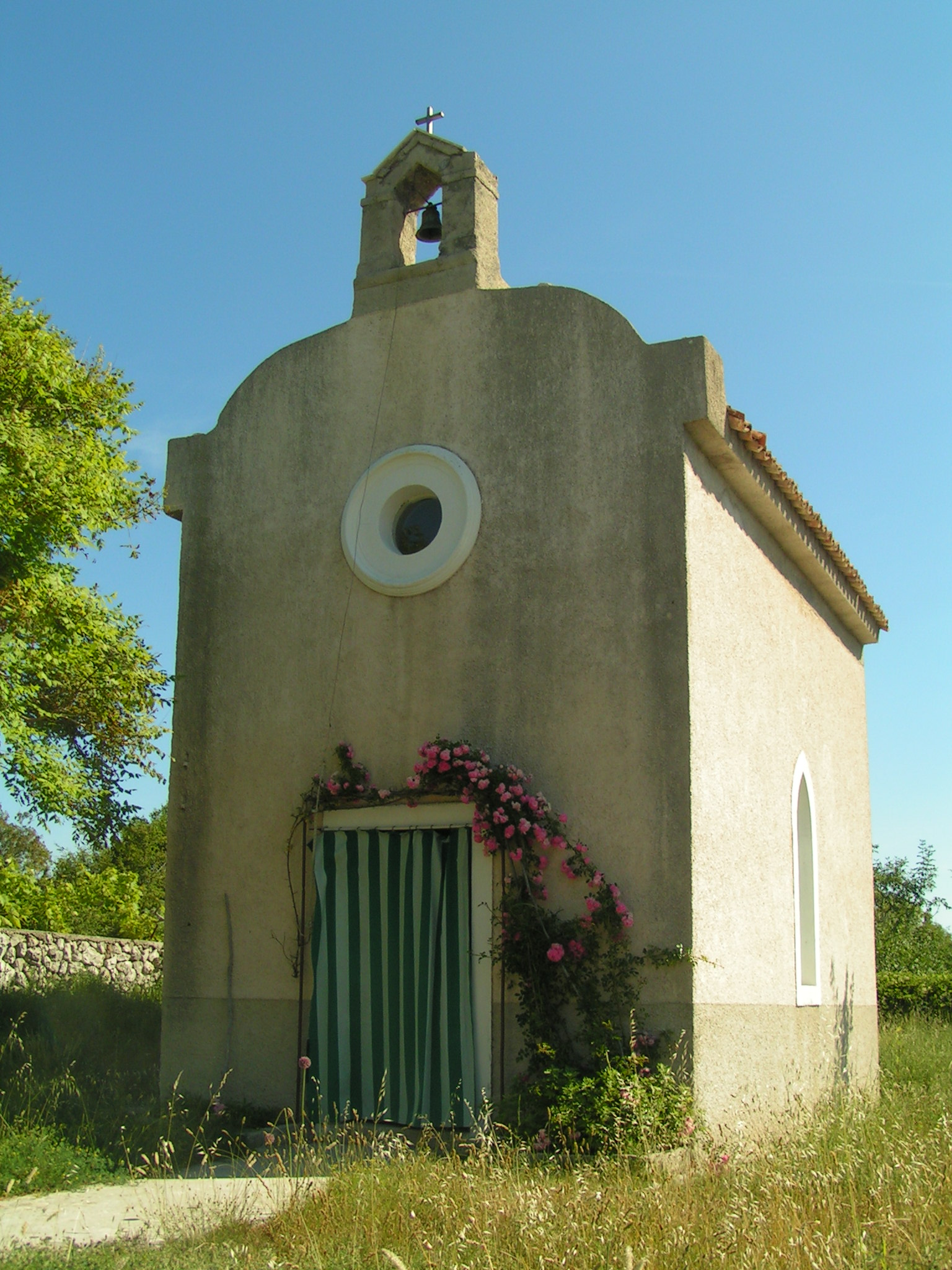
- Chapel in Grmov

- Location within Croatia
- Coordinates: 44.82399°N 14.38028°E
- Country: Croatia
- County: Primorje-Gorski Kotar
- Town: Cres

Area
  - Total: 5.2 km^{2} (2.0 sq mi)

Population (2021)
  - Total: 2
  - Density: 0.38/km^{2} (1.0/sq mi)
- Time zone: UTC+1 (CET)
  - Summer (DST): UTC+2 (CEST)
- Postal code: 51556
- Area code: 051
- Vehicle registration: RI

Grmov (Italian: Ghermonici, Ghermovi, Ghermov) is a village on the Croatian island of Cres, in Primorje-Gorski Kotar. Administratively, it is part of the town of Cres. As of 2021, it had a population of 2. It is located to the south of Lake Vrana.
