= Vodice, Cres =

Village in Primorje-Gorski Kotar, Croatia

Vodice Vodizze
- Village
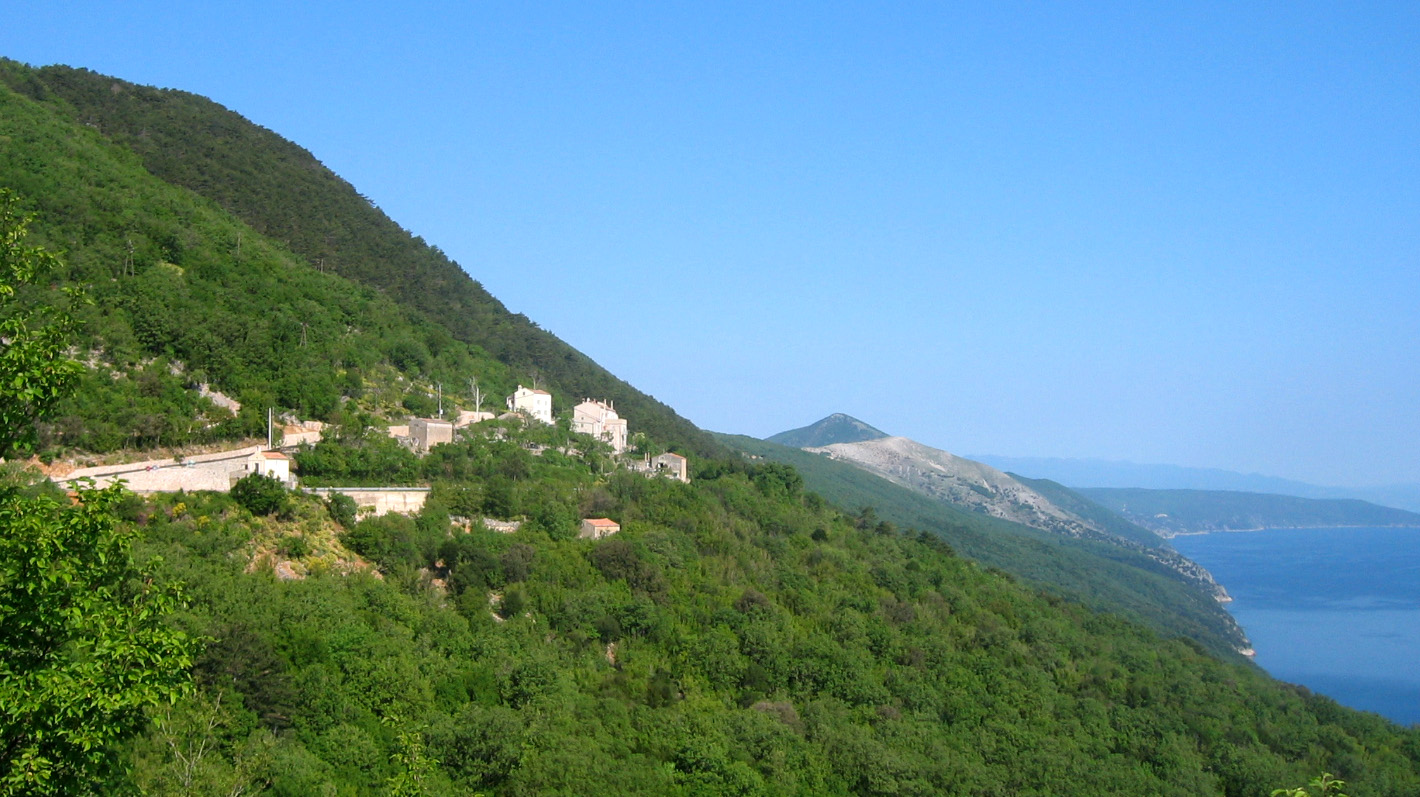
- View of Vodice

- Location within Croatia
- Coordinates: 45°00′29″N 14°23′46″E
- Country: Croatia
- County: Primorje-Gorski Kotar
- Town: Cres

Area
  - Total: 13.4 km^{2} (5.2 sq mi)

Population (2021)
  - Total: 5
  - Density: 0.37/km^{2} (0.97/sq mi)
- Time zone: UTC+1 (CET)
  - Summer (DST): UTC+2 (CEST)
- Postal code: 51557
- Area code: 051
- Vehicle registration: RI

Vodice (Croatian pronunciation: [ʋɔ̌ditsɛ], Italian: Vodizze) is a village located on the Croatian island of Cres, in Primorje-Gorski Kotar. Administratively, it is part of the town of Cres. As of 2021, it had a population of 5.

== Architecture ==
A church devoted to Saint Stephen (Note: 45.0066°N 14.3965°E) is situated in the village.

The Sv. Blaža church (Note: 45.0046°N 14.3527°E) dedicated to Saint Blaise, is on the shore over the ridge from the village.

== Gallery ==
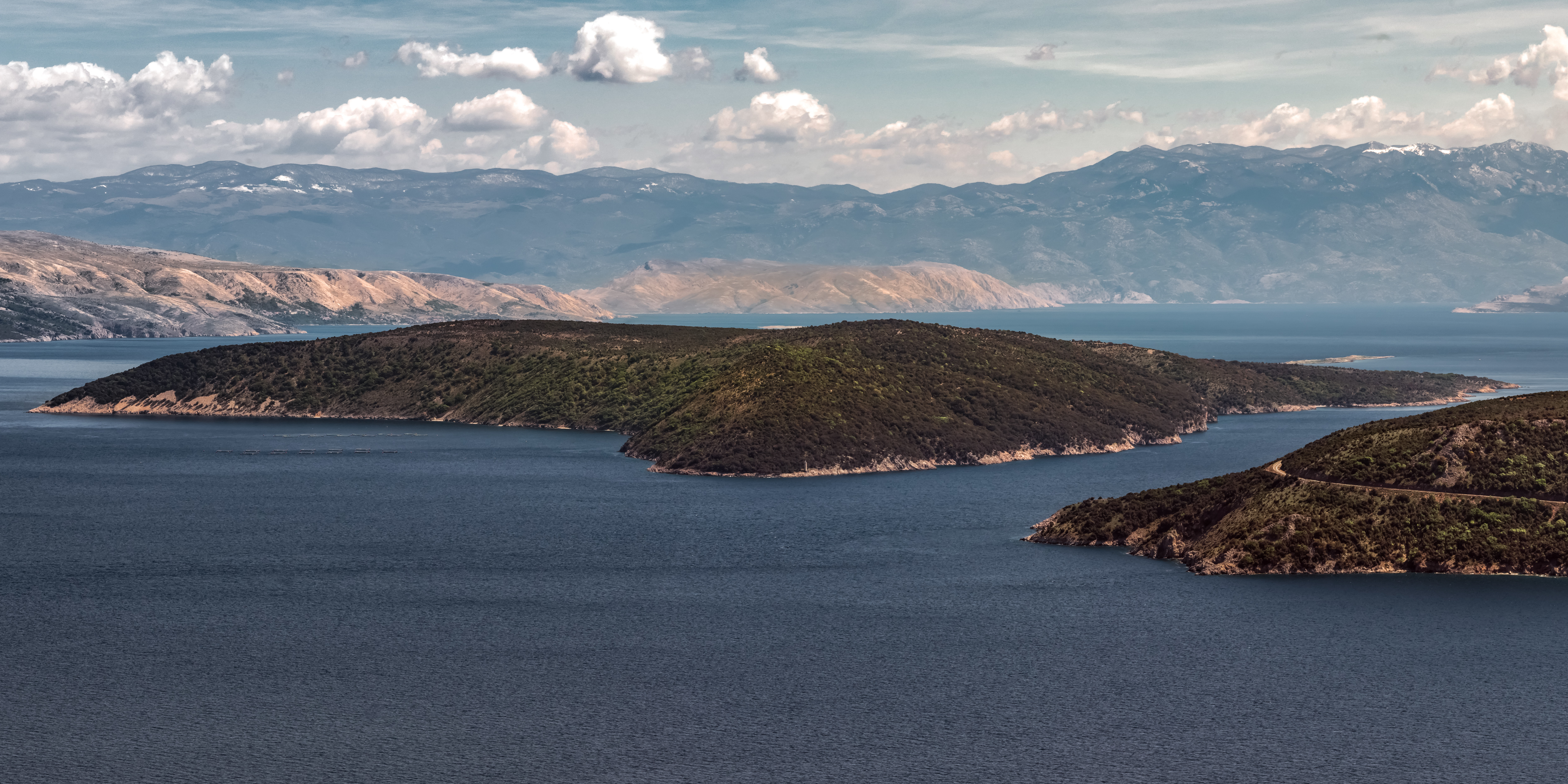
View of Plavnik from south of Vodice
