= Zbičina =

Village in Primorje-Gorski Kotar, Croatia

Zbičina Sbicina
- Village
- Location within Croatia
- Coordinates: 44.90017°N 14.34883°E
- Country: Croatia
- County: Primorje-Gorski Kotar
- Town: Cres

Area
  - Total: 6.6 km^{2} (2.5 sq mi)

Population (2021)
  - Total: 3
  - Density: 0.45/km^{2} (1.2/sq mi)
- Time zone: UTC+1 (CET)
  - Summer (DST): UTC+2 (CEST)
- Postal code: 51557
- Area code: 051
- Vehicle registration: RI

Zbičina (Italian: Sbicina, Sbiccina, Sbicinaz) is a village on the Croatian island of Cres, in Primorje-Gorski Kotar. Administratively, it is part of the town of Cres. As of 2021, it had a population of 3. A church devoted to Nativity of the Blessed Virgin Mary (Note: 44.8998°N 14.3492°E) is situated in the village.
