= Filozići =

Village in Primorje-Gorski Kotar, Croatia

Filozići Filossici
- Village
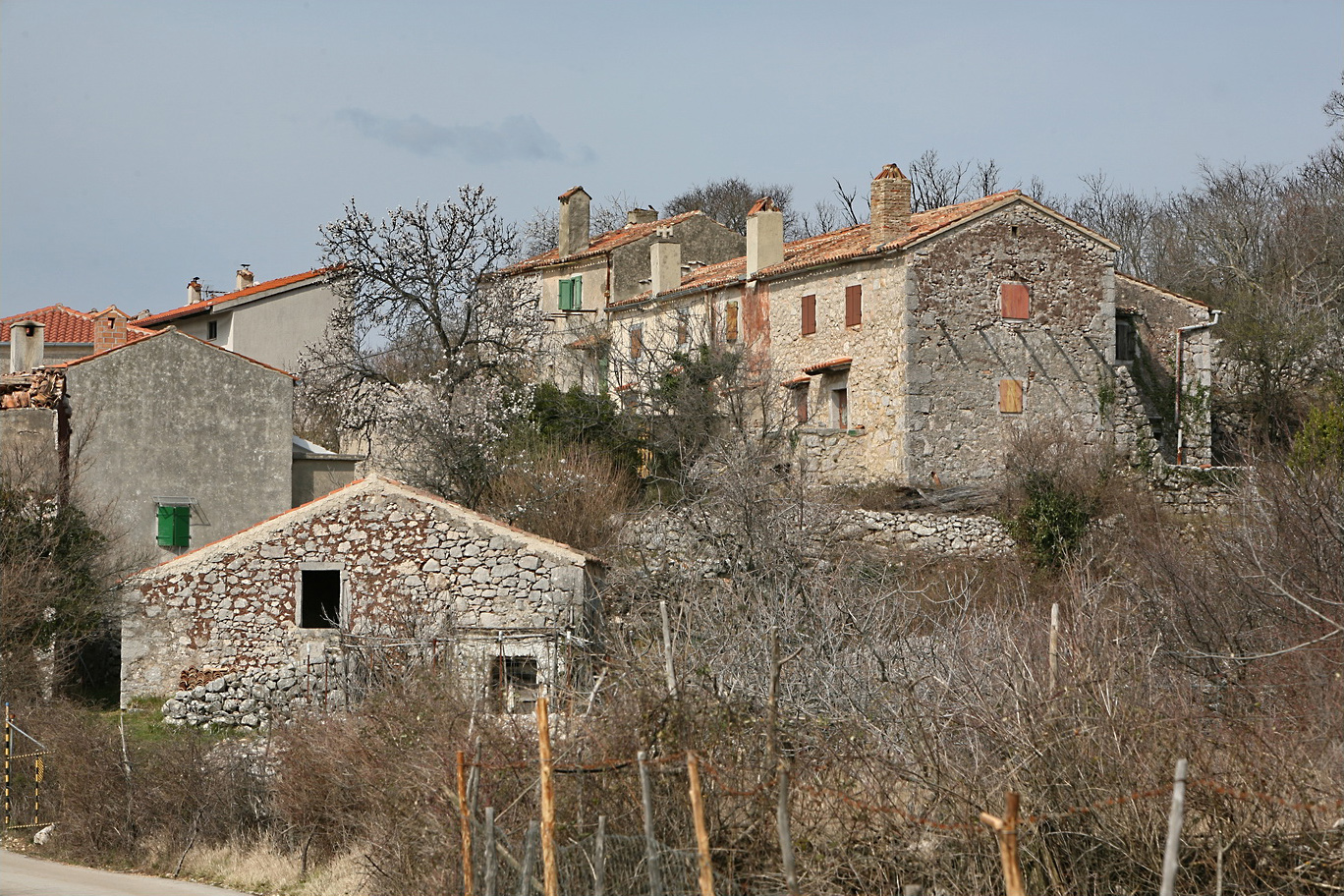
- Houses in Filozići
- Interactive map of Filozići
- Location within Croatia
- Coordinates: 45.11093°N 14.29613°E
- Country: Croatia
- County: Primorje-Gorski Kotar
- Town: Cres

Area
  - Total: 10.6 km^{2} (4.1 sq mi)

Population (2021)
  - Total: 8
  - Density: 0.75/km^{2} (2.0/sq mi)
- Time zone: UTC+1 (CET)
  - Summer (DST): UTC+2 (CEST)
- Postal code: 51557
- Area code: 051
- Vehicle registration: RI

Filozići (Italian: Filossici) is a village located on the northern end of the Croatian island of Cres, in Primorje-Gorski Kotar. Administratively, it is part of the town of Cres. As of 2021, it had a population of 8. A church devoted to Saint Dominic is situated in the village.

== Architecture ==
The Sv. Roka church, (Note: 45.1106°N 14.2963°E) dedicated to Saint Roch, is in the village.

The Sv. Marije Magdalene church, (Note: 45.1138°N 14.2941°E) dedicated to Saint Mary Magdalene, is just north of the village.

== Gallery ==
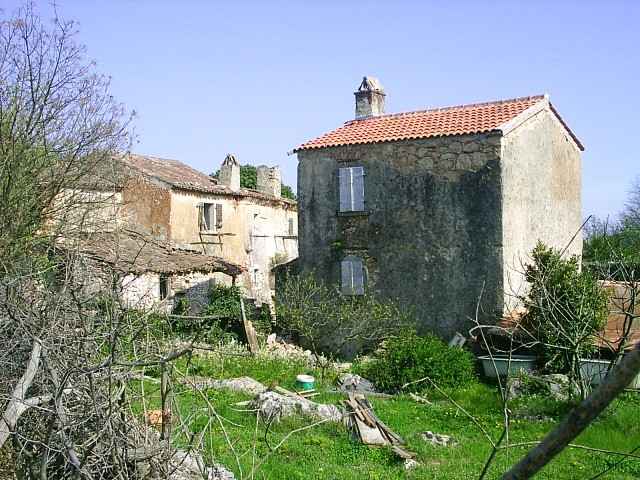
Last inhabited house
