= Dragozetići =

Village in Primorje-Gorski Kotar, Croatia

Dragozetići Dragossetici
- Village
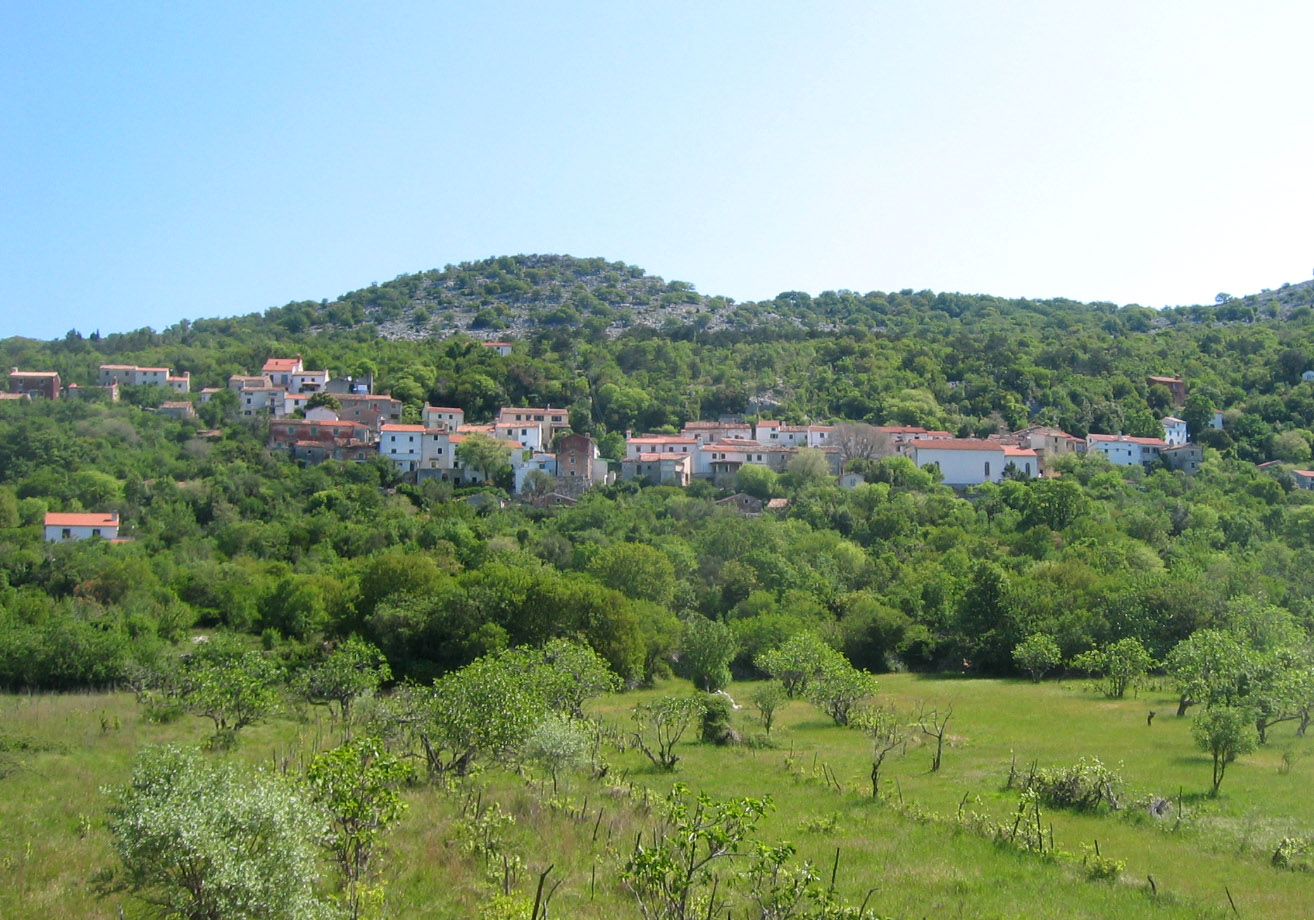
- View of Dragozetići

- Location within Croatia
- Coordinates: 45.09692°N 14.30693°E
- Country: Croatia
- County: Primorje-Gorski Kotar
- Town: Cres

Area
  - Total: 15.7 km^{2} (6.1 sq mi)

Population (2021)
  - Total: 22
  - Density: 1.4/km^{2} (3.6/sq mi)
- Time zone: UTC+1 (CET)
  - Summer (DST): UTC+2 (CEST)
- Postal code: 51557
- Area code: 051
- Vehicle registration: RI

Dragozetići (Italian: Dragossetti di Cherso, Dragossetici, Dragossici) is a village on the Croatian island of Cres, in Primorje-Gorski Kotar. Administratively, it is part of the town of Cres. As of 2021, it had a population of 22. A Church of the Assumption of Blessed Virgin Mary (Croatian: Crkva Uznesenja Blažene Djevice Marije) (Note: 45.0966°N 14.3067°E) is situated in the village.

== Gallery ==
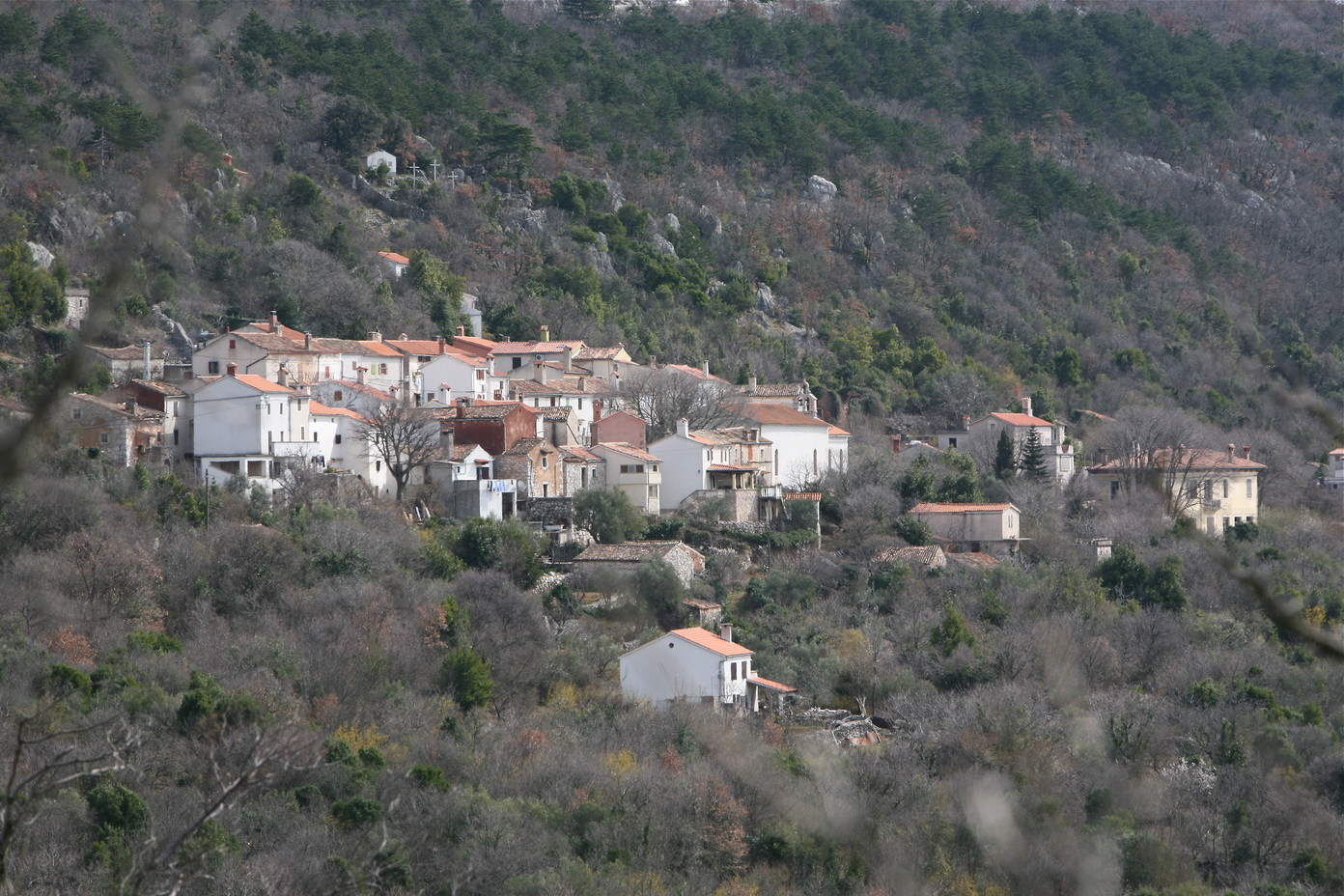
Side view

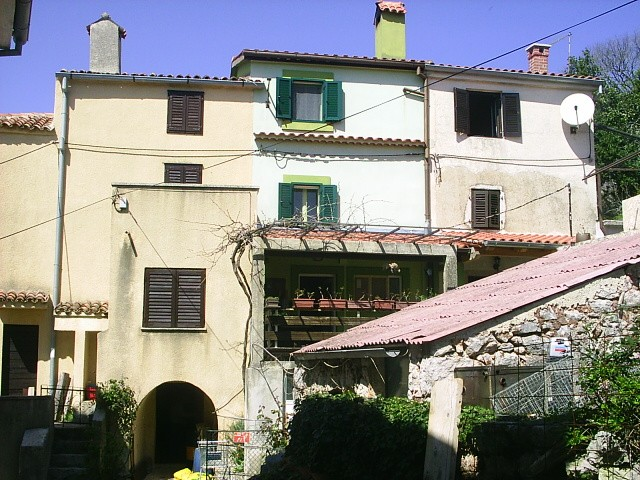
Architecture

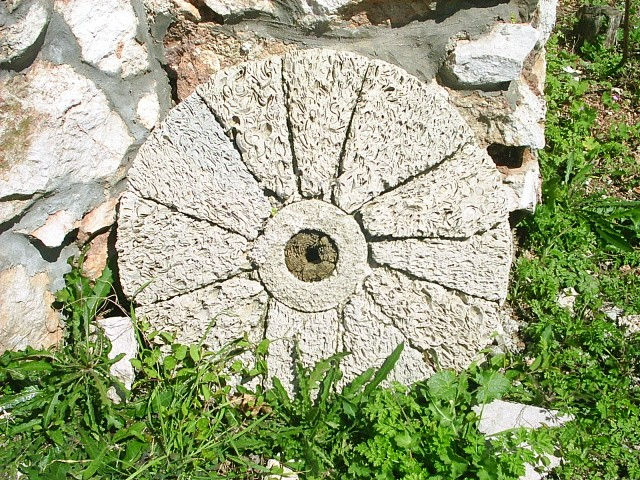
Limestone wheel

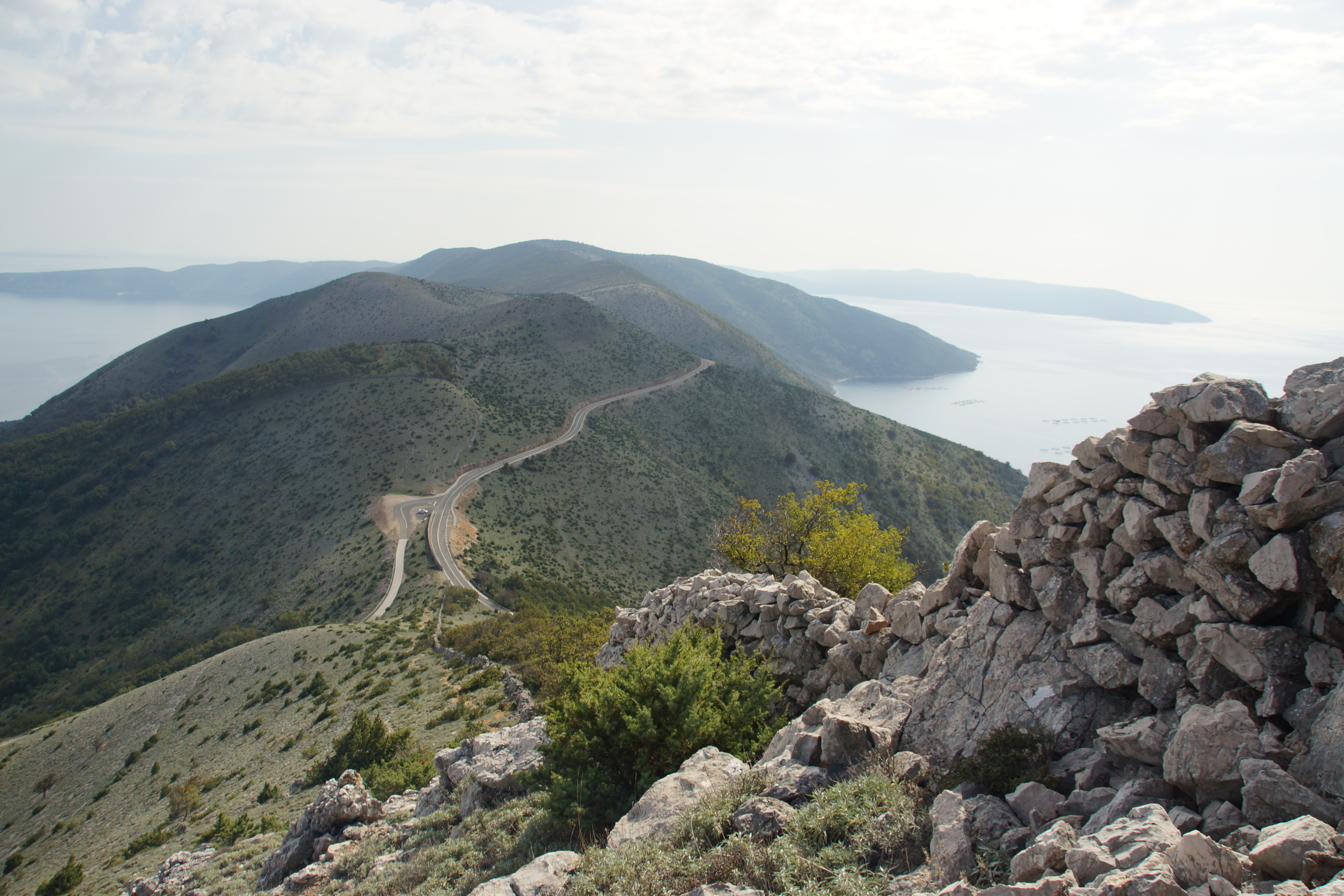
View from mountain above

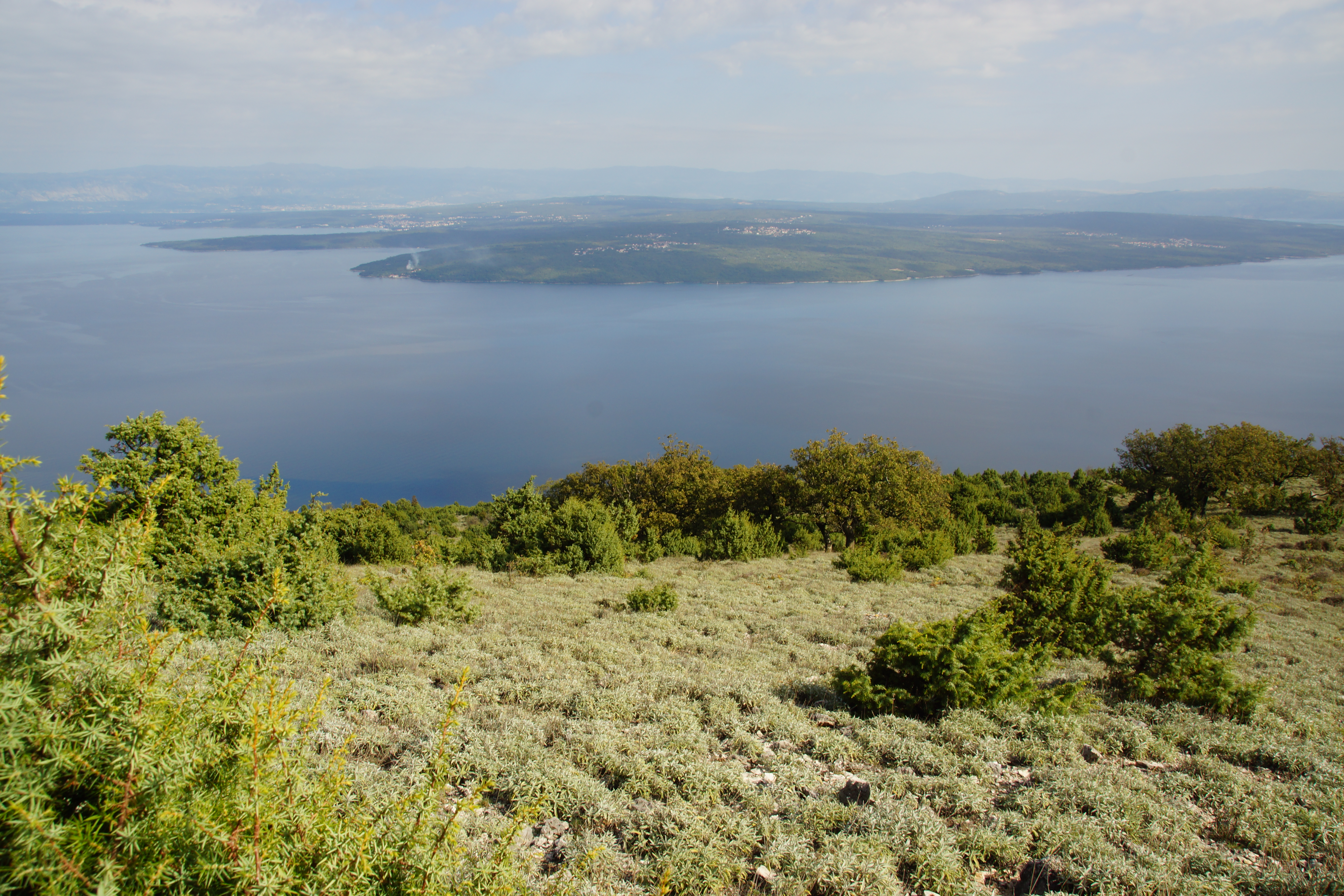
View towards Krk
