= Ivanje, Croatia =

Village in Primorje-Gorski Kotar, Croatia

Ivanje
- Village
- Location within Croatia
- Coordinates: 45.14966°N 14.32010°E
- Country: Croatia
- County: Primorje-Gorski Kotar
- Town: Cres

Area
  - Total: 10.5 km^{2} (4.1 sq mi)

Population (2021)
  - Total: 9
  - Density: 0.86/km^{2} (2.2/sq mi)
- Time zone: UTC+1 (CET)
  - Summer (DST): UTC+2 (CEST)
- Postal code: 51559
- Area code: 051
- Vehicle registration: RI

Ivanje is the northern-most village on the Croatian island of Cres, in Primorje-Gorski Kotar. Administratively, it is part of the town of Cres. As of 2021, it had a population of 9.

== Architecture ==
The Sv. Marije od Pohođenja church, (Note: 45.1490°N 14.3209°E) dedicated to the Visitation, is in the village.

== Gallery ==
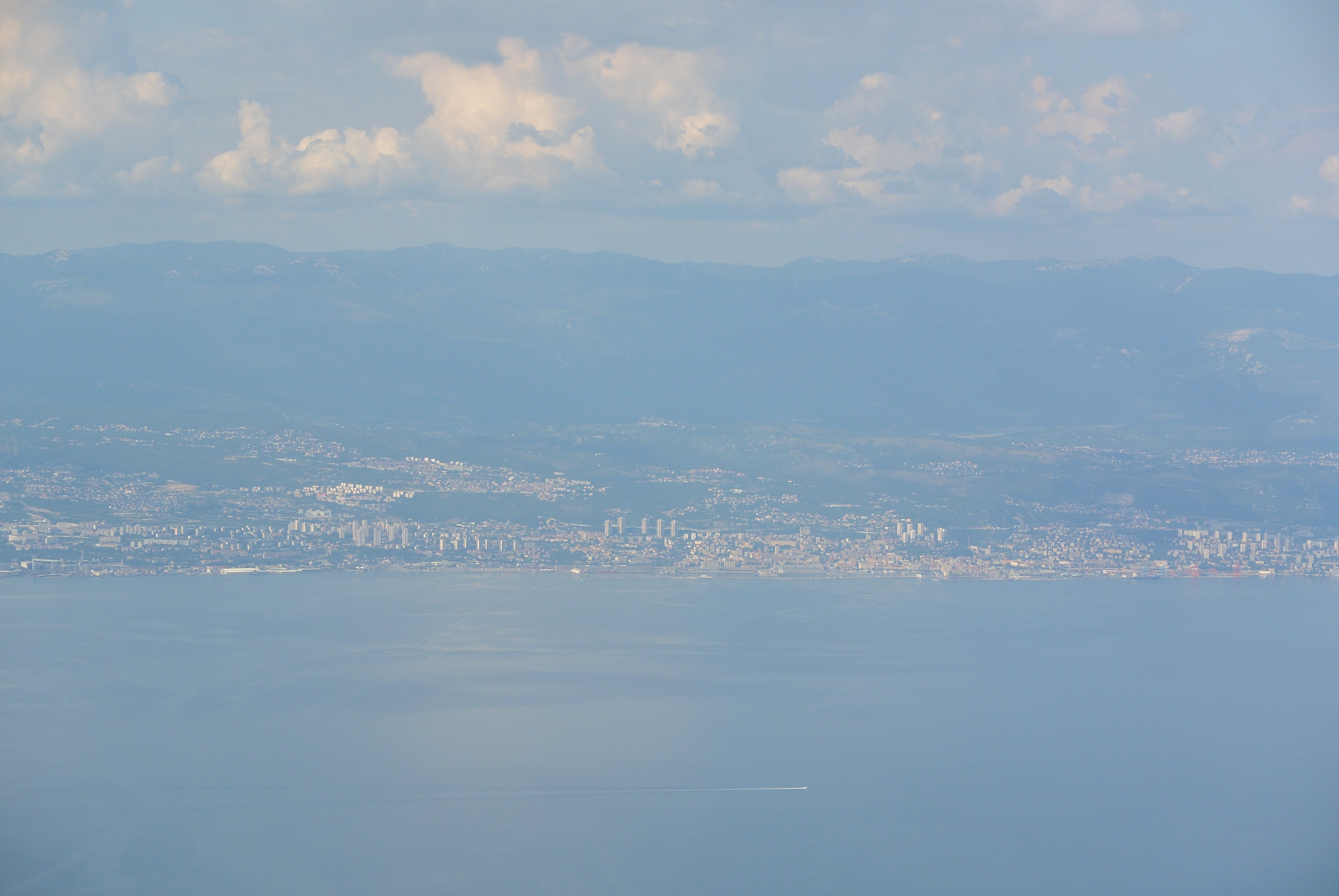
View of Rijeka from Ivanje
