= Miholašćica =

Village in Primorje-Gorski Kotar, Croatia

Miholašćica San Michele di Cherso
- Village
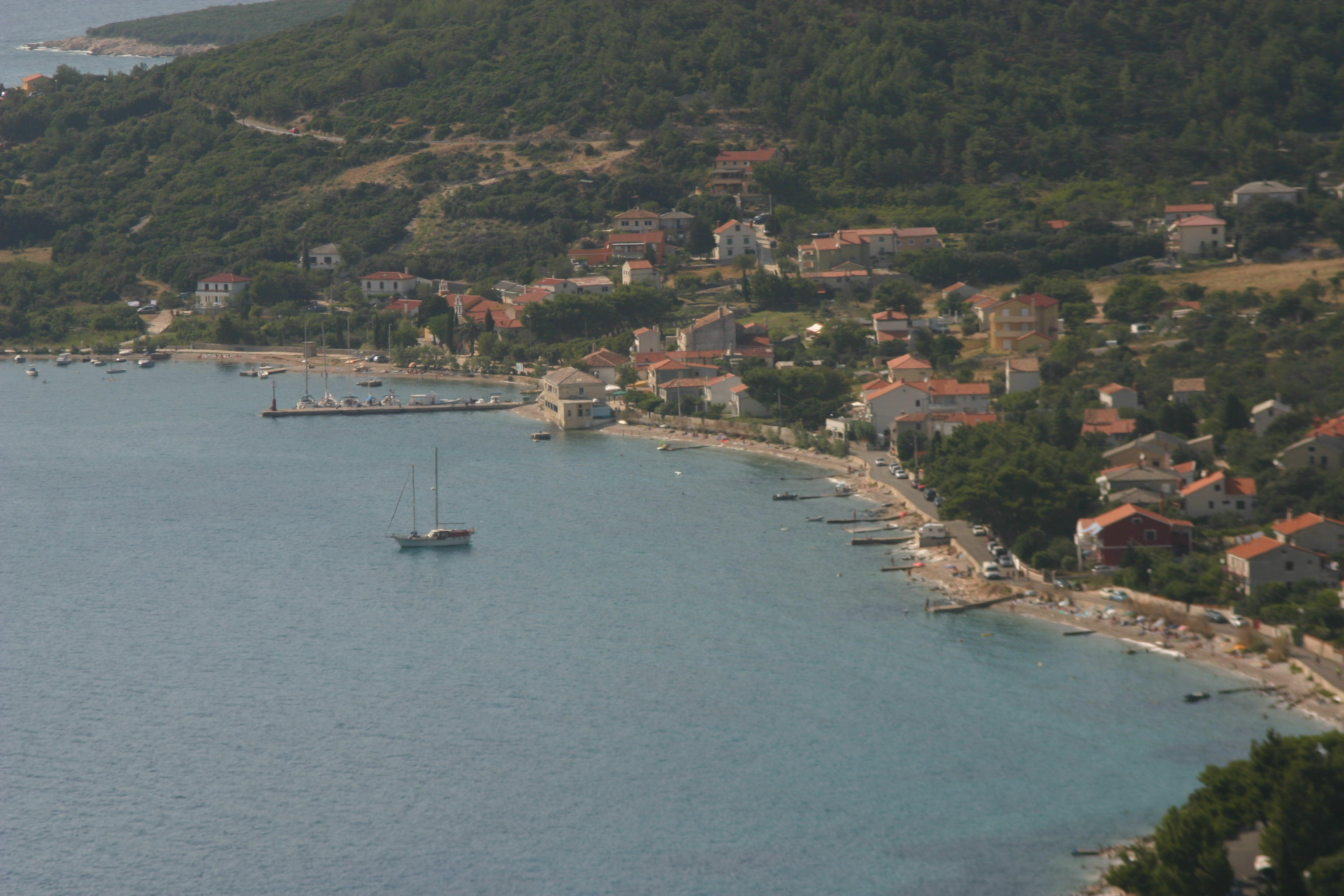
- View of Miholašćica

- Location within Croatia
- Coordinates: 44.80324°N 14.37045°E
- Country: Croatia
- County: Primorje-Gorski Kotar
- Town: Cres

Area
  - Total: 4.3 km^{2} (1.7 sq mi)

Population (2021)
  - Total: 31
  - Density: 7.2/km^{2} (19/sq mi)
- Time zone: UTC+1 (CET)
  - Summer (DST): UTC+2 (CEST)
- Postal code: 51556
- Area code: 051
- Vehicle registration: RI

Miholašćica (Italian: San Michele di Cherso) is a coastal village on the Croatian island of Cres, in Primorje-Gorski Kotar. Administratively, it is part of the town of Cres. As of 2021, it had a population of 31.
