= Pernat =

Village in Primorje-Gorski Kotar, Croatia

Pernat Pernata
- Village
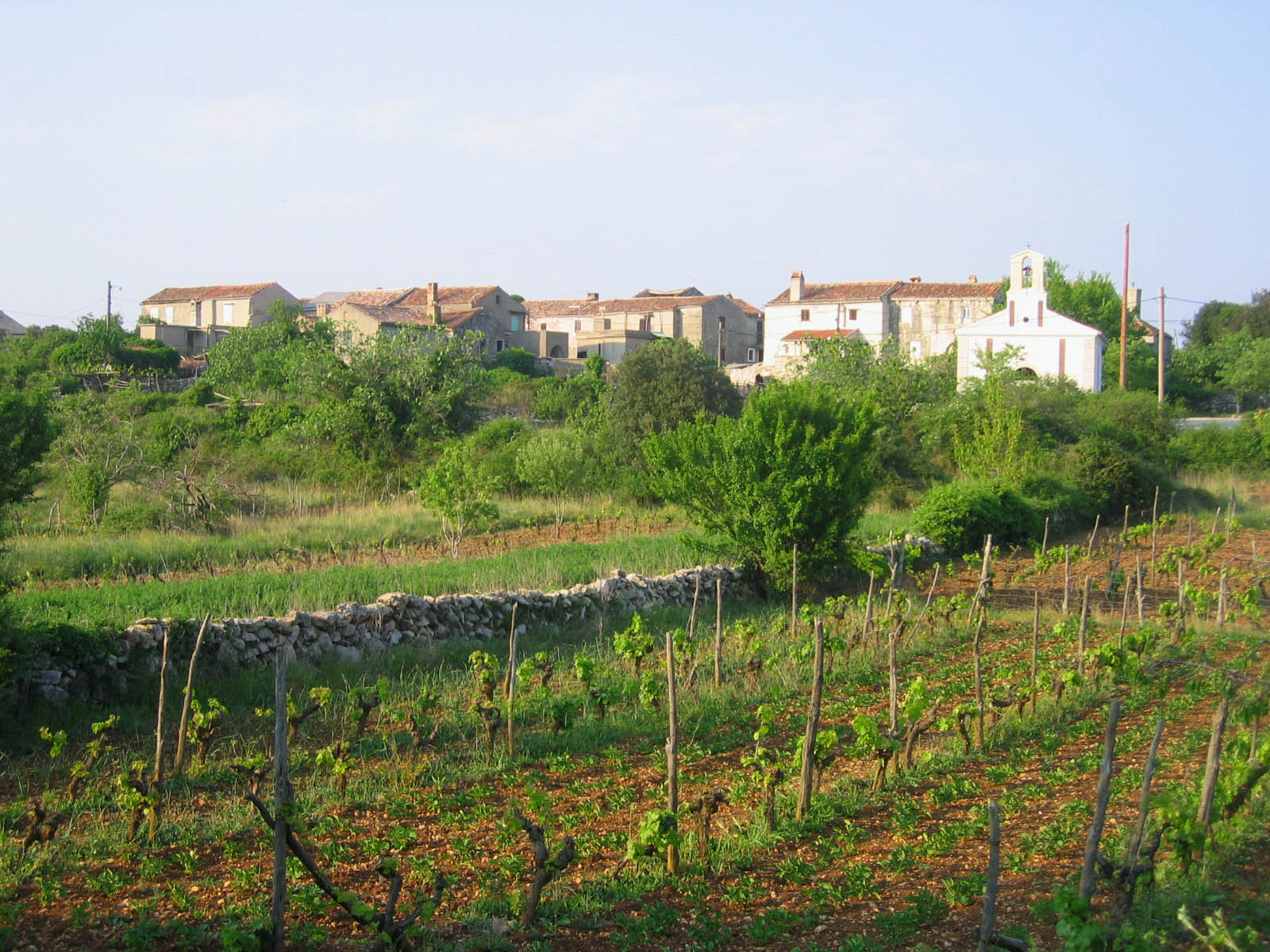
- View of Pernat

- Location within Croatia
- Coordinates: 44.91881°N 14.33214°E
- Country: Croatia
- County: Primorje-Gorski Kotar
- Town: Cres

Area
  - Total: 11.5 km^{2} (4.4 sq mi)

Population (2021)
  - Total: 2
  - Density: 0.17/km^{2} (0.45/sq mi)
- Time zone: UTC+1 (CET)
  - Summer (DST): UTC+2 (CEST)
- Postal code: 51557
- Area code: 051
- Vehicle registration: RI

Pernat (Croatian pronunciation: [pěrnat], Italian: Pernata, Pernatto) is a village on the Croatian island of Cres, in Primorje-Gorski Kotar. Administratively, it is part of the town of Cres. As of 2021, it had a population of 2. A church devoted to Our Lady of Lourdes (Note: 44.9184°N 14.3321°E) is situated in the village, and another devoted to Saint George (Note: 44.9137°N 14.3381°E) to the southeast.

== Gallery ==
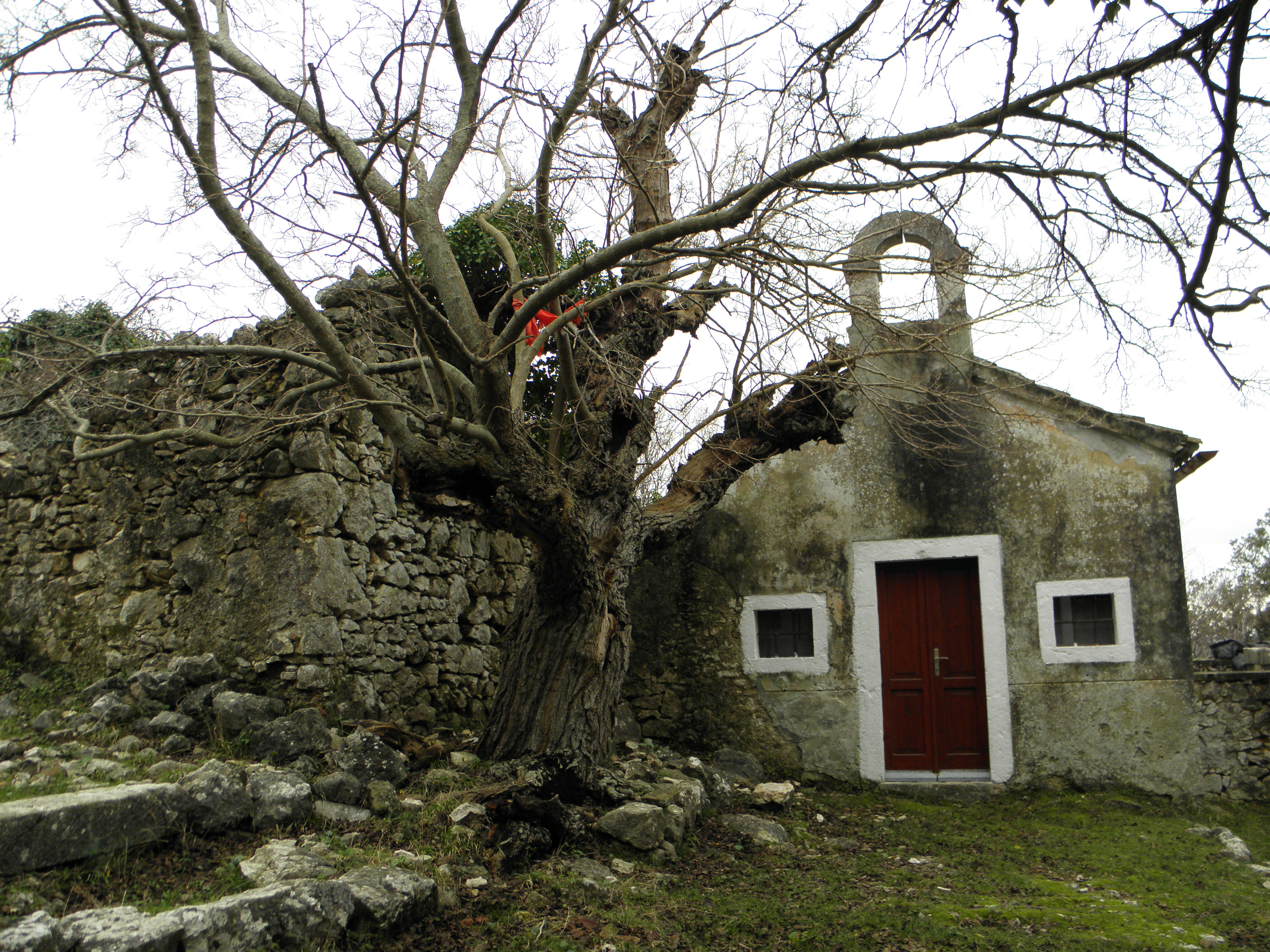
Chapel

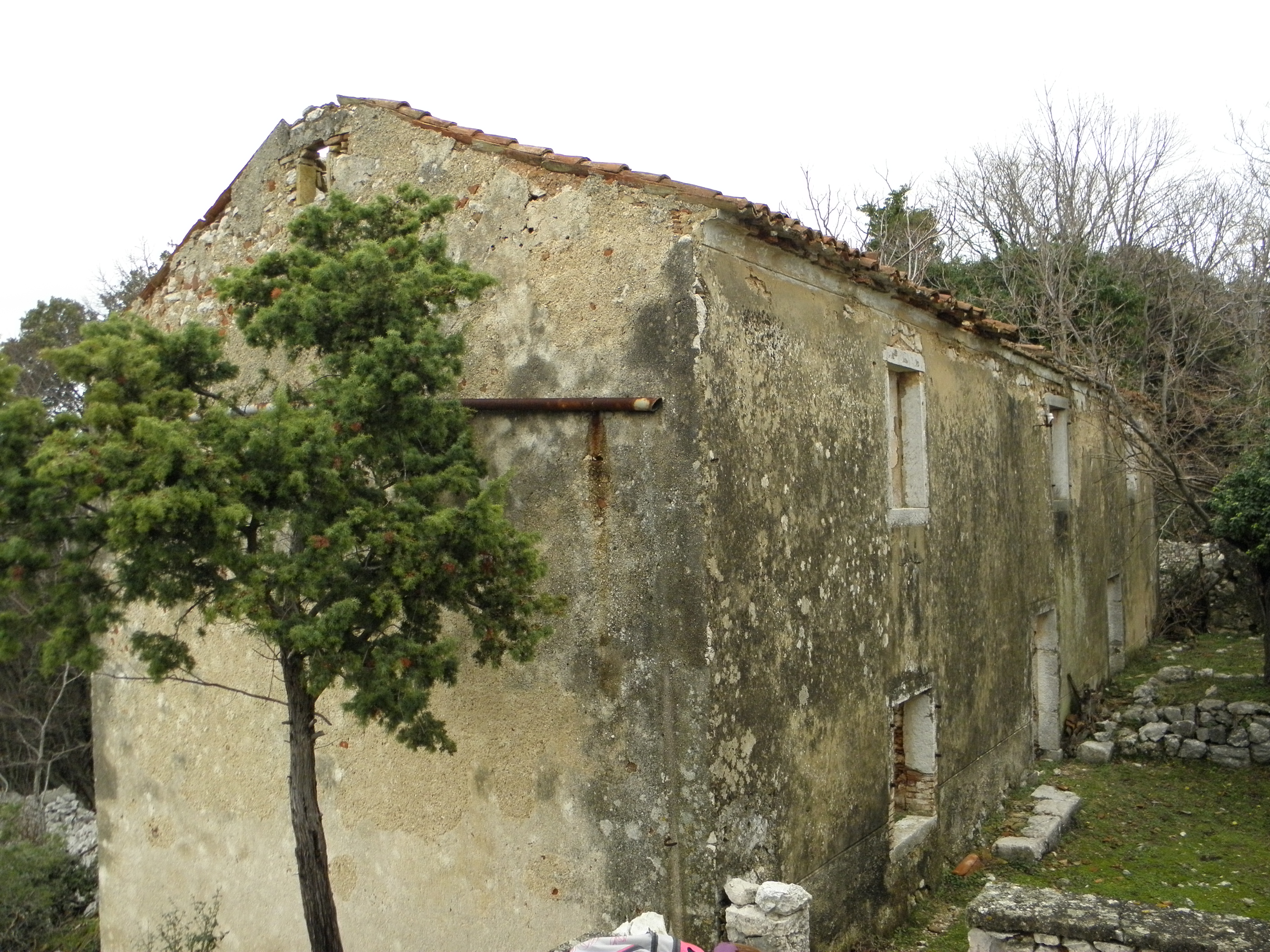
House

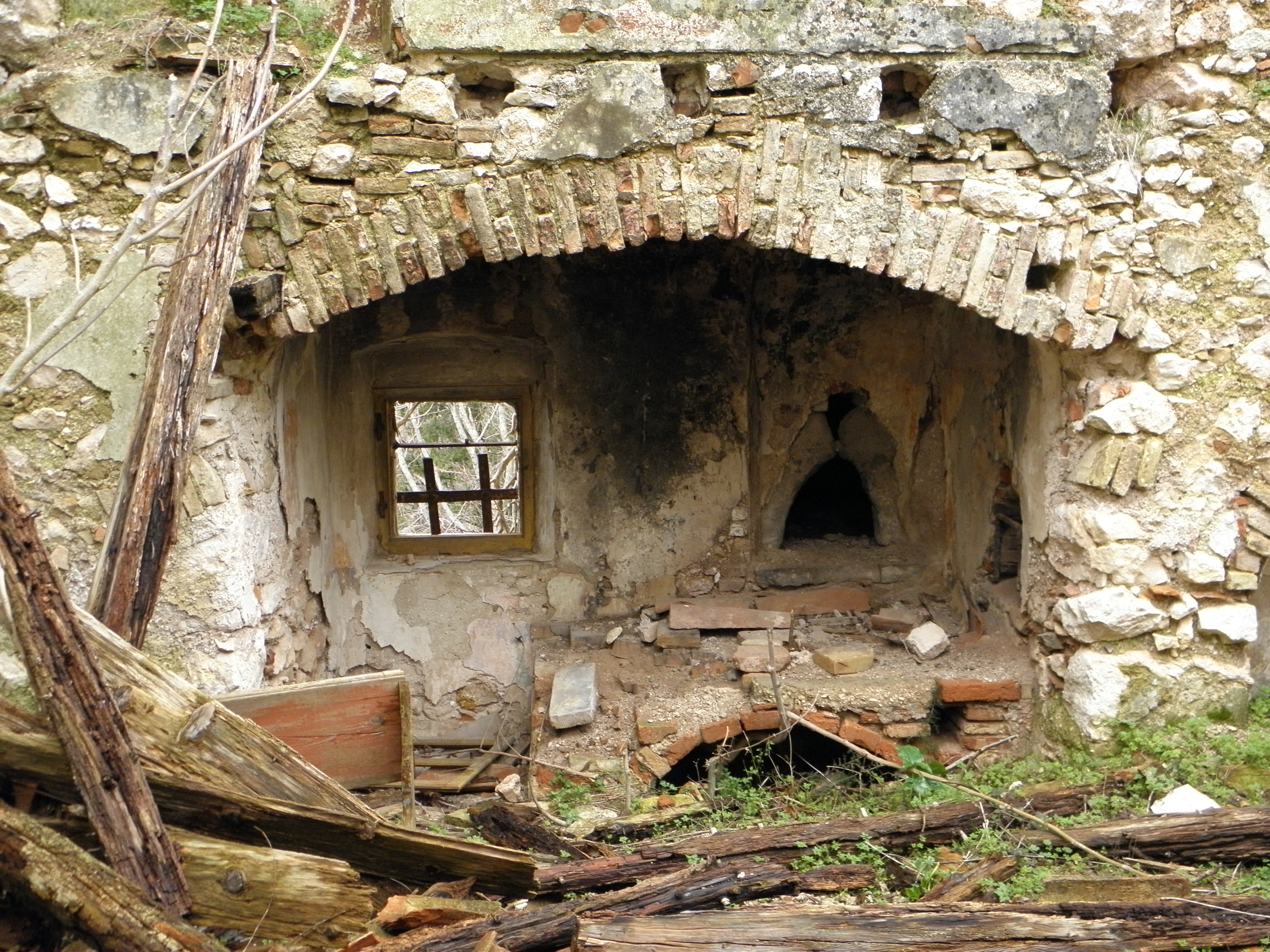
Old hearth

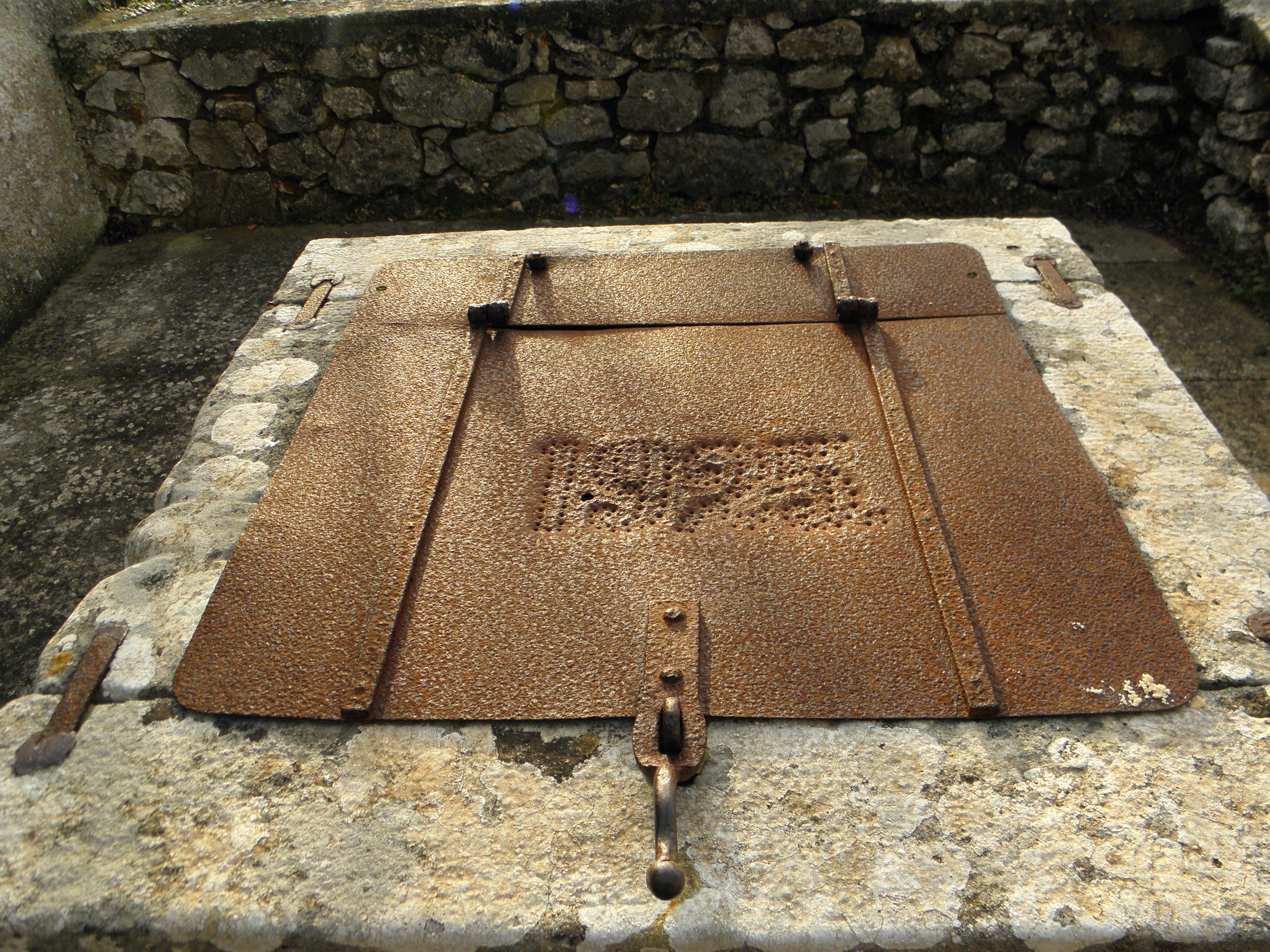
1925 well
