= Zbišina =

Village in Primorje-Gorski Kotar, Croatia

Zbišina Sbissina
- Village
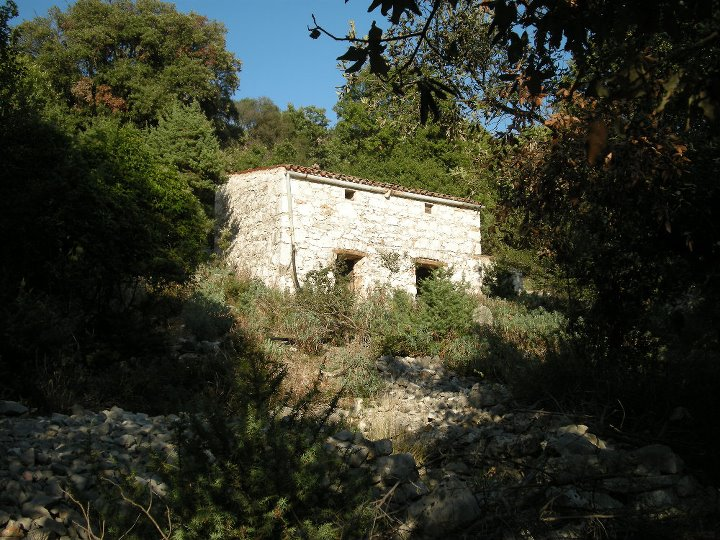
- House in Zbišina

- Location within Croatia
- Coordinates: 44.86893°N 14.39865°E
- Country: Croatia
- County: Primorje-Gorski Kotar
- Town: Cres

Area
  - Total: 12.0 km^{2} (4.6 sq mi)

Population (2021)
  - Total: 2
  - Density: 0.17/km^{2} (0.43/sq mi)
- Time zone: UTC+1 (CET)
  - Summer (DST): UTC+2 (CEST)
- Postal code: 51557
- Area code: 051
- Vehicle registration: RI

Zbišina (Italian: Sbissina) is a village on the Croatian island of Cres, in Primorje-Gorski Kotar. Administratively, it is part of the town of Cres. As of 2021, it had a population of 2. It is located just to the west of Lake Vrana.
