= Loznati =

Village in Primorje-Gorski Kotar, Croatia

Loznati Losnati
- Village
- Location within Croatia
- Coordinates: 44.92256°N 14.43769°E
- Country: Croatia
- County: Primorje-Gorski Kotar
- Town: Cres

Area
  - Total: 14.6 km^{2} (5.6 sq mi)

Population (2021)
  - Total: 36
  - Density: 2.5/km^{2} (6.4/sq mi)
- Time zone: UTC+1 (CET)
  - Summer (DST): UTC+2 (CEST)
- Postal code: 51557
- Area code: 051
- Vehicle registration: RI

Loznati (Italian: Losnati) is a village located on the Croatian island of Cres, in Primorje-Gorski Kotar. Administratively, it is part of the town of Cres. As of 2021, it had a population of 36.
