= Cres (town) =

- Town
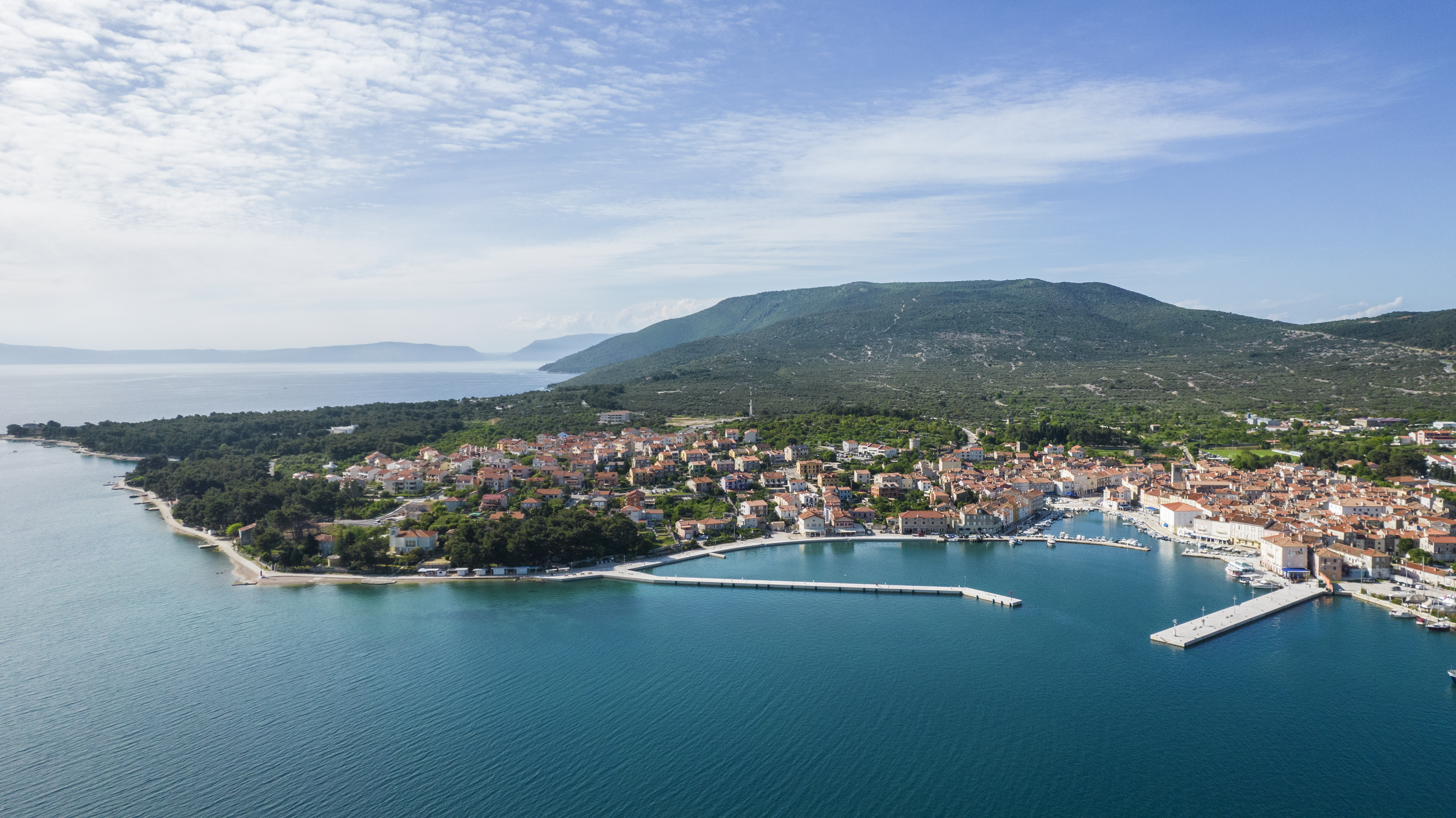
- Cres

- Location of Cres within Croatia
- Coordinates: 44°57′36″N 14°24′29″E
- Country: Croatia
- County: Primorje-Gorski Kotar County
- Island: Cres

Government
  - Mayor: Marin Gregorović (SDP)

Area
  - Town: 291.5 km^{2} (112.5 sq mi)
  - Urban: 19.5 km^{2} (7.5 sq mi)
- Elevation: 0 m (0 ft)

Population (2021)
  - Town: 2,716
  - Density: 9.317/km^{2} (24.13/sq mi)
  - Urban: 2,185
  - Urban density: 112/km^{2} (290/sq mi)
- Time zone: UTC+1 (CET)
  - Summer (DST): UTC+2 (CEST)
- Postal code: 51 557
- Area code: 051
- Website: www.cres.hr

Cres (Note: Croatian pronunciation: [t͡srês]; Ancient Greek: Κρέψα, Latin: Crepsa;, Dalmatian: Crepsa, Venetian: Cherso, Italian: Cherso, Greek: Χέρσος) is a town located on the island of Cres which is directly off the Istrian Peninsula and in the Kvarner Gulf off the northern coast of Croatia. As of 2021, the town had a population of 2,716 inhabitants, which makes it the largest municipality on the island.

== Town ==
Cres is a city on the bay, as its town docks come directly into the middle of the city and are filled with boats. There is a car park at the entrance to the city, along with multiple restaurants and a gas station. Upon entering the city through one of the gates, there are narrow paths lined by houses and small stores. In the center, there is an open piazza, with people selling different homemade goods. There are also shops and open-air restaurants in which people can sit on the edge and watch the boats come in.

== Climate ==
Since records began in 1985, the highest temperature recorded at the local weather station was 41.5 °C (106.7 °F), on 21 July 2015. The coldest temperature was −8.0 °C (17.6 °F), on 7 January 1985.

== Population ==
As of the 2021 census, Cres has a population of 2,716 with 89.32% being Croats.

Town of Cres: Population trends 1857–2021
v

population	7223	7263	7562	7815	7609	7626	7214	7196	5843	4221	3786	3145	2895	2971	2959	2879	2716
	1857	1869	1880	1890	1900	1910	1921	1931	1948	1953	1961	1971	1981	1991	2001	2011	2021

Sources: Croatian Bureau of Statistics publications

=== Settlements ===
Administratively, the town of Cres comprises 26 settlements, of which 2 are uninhabited. Each of them is listed below, with their respective population as of 2021.

- Beli, population 54
- Cres, population 2185
- Dragozetići, population 22
- Filozići, population 8
- Grmov, population 2
- Ivanje, population 9
- Loznati, population 36
- Lubenice, population 6
- Mali Podol, population 3
- Martinšćica, population 103
- Merag, population 22
- Miholašćica, population 31
- Orlec, population 88
- Pernat, population 2
- Porozina, population 28
- Predošćica, population 1
- Stanić, population 0
- Stivan, population 24
- Sveti Petar, population 7
- Valun, population 64
- Važminež, population 0
- Vidovići, population 4
- Vodice, population 5
- Vrana, population 7
- Zbičina, population 3
- Zbišina, population 2

== Marina ==
Cres is home to a Blue-Flag-status marina on the outskirts of the city. This is separate from the concrete center docks seen inside the actual city. The marina is home to ships of many people on the island and is also home to a dry dock where many ships are repaired. The Adriatic Sea is ideal for fishing and this port is important to the industry.

== Gallery ==
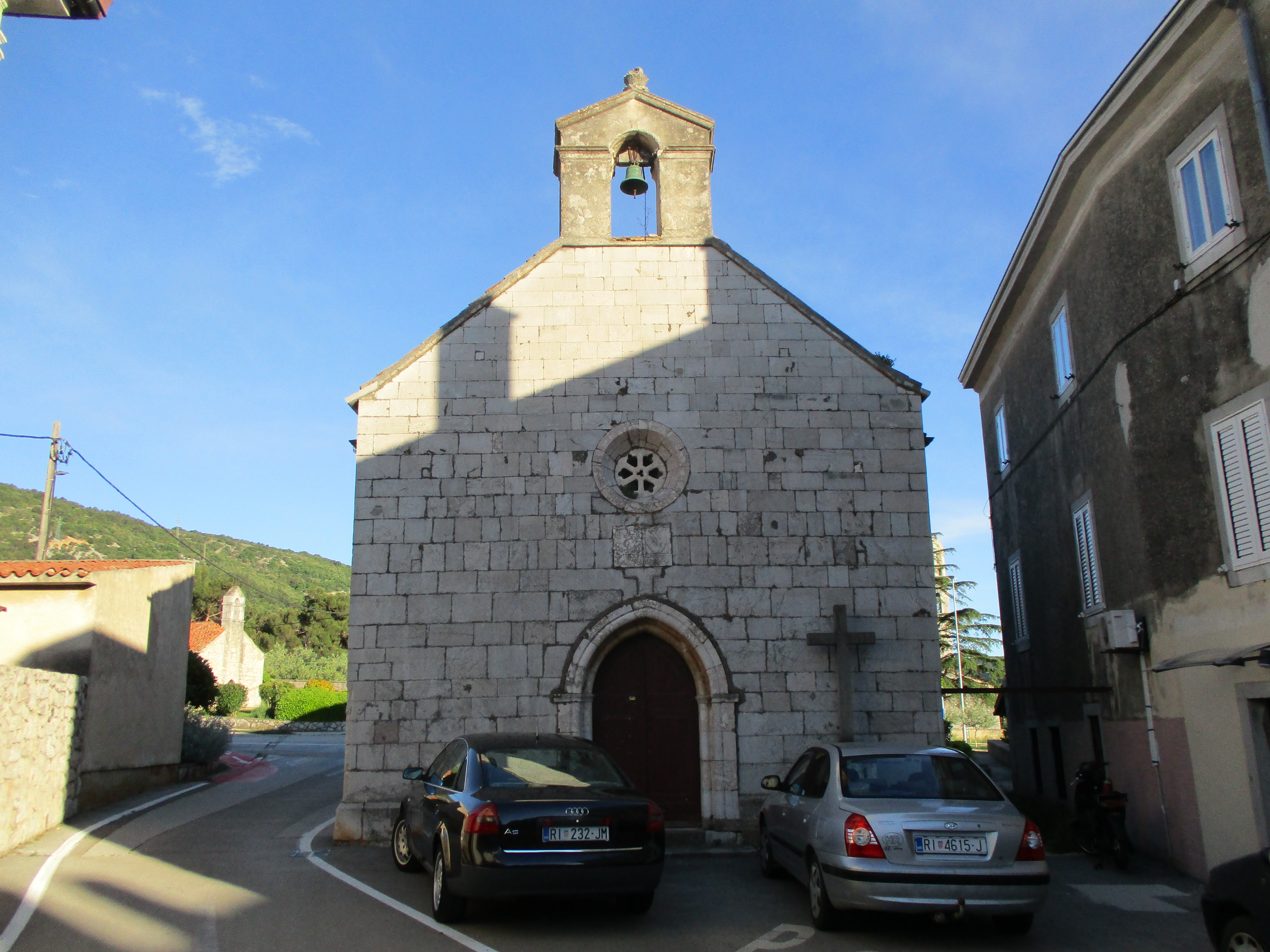

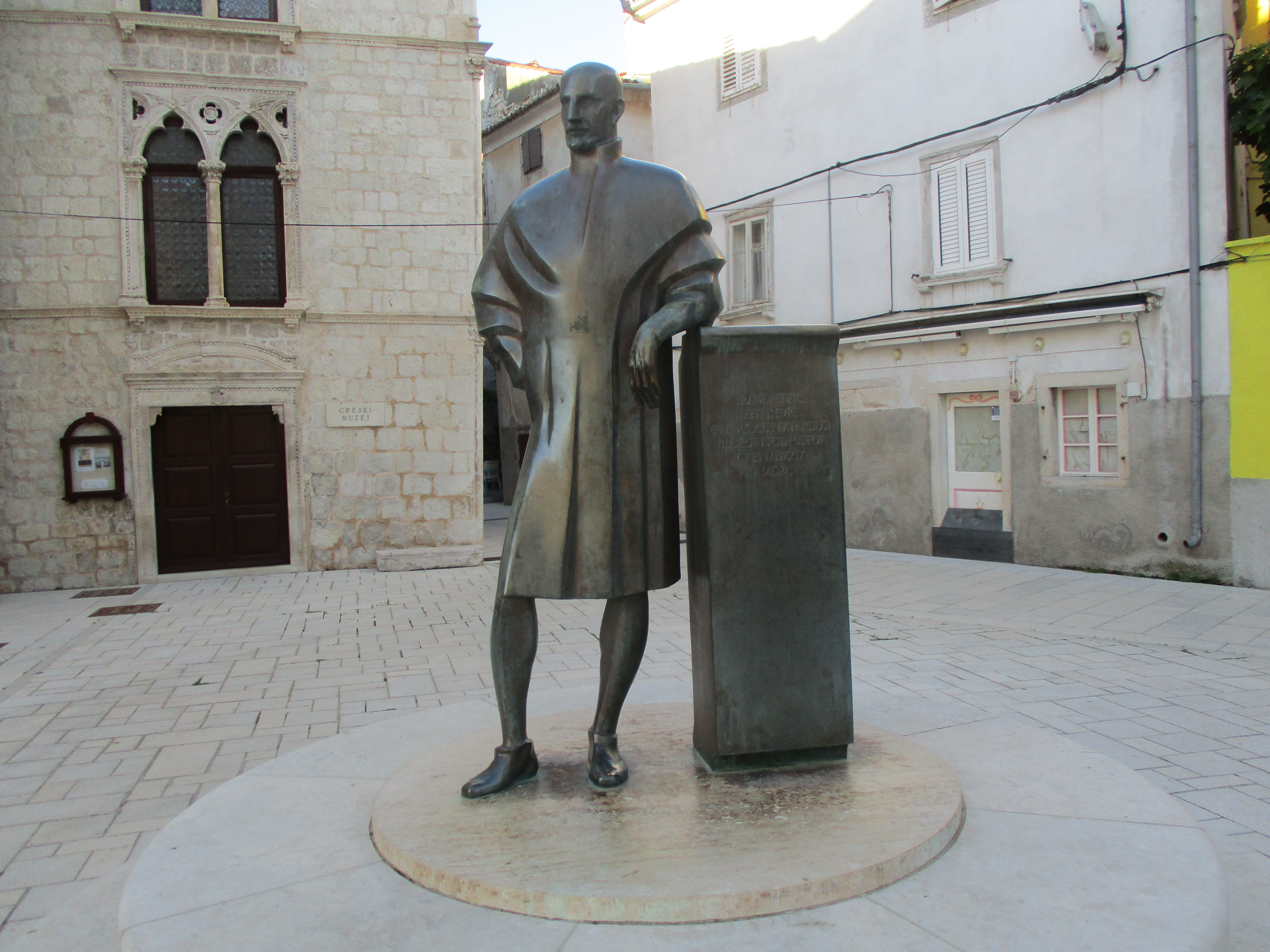

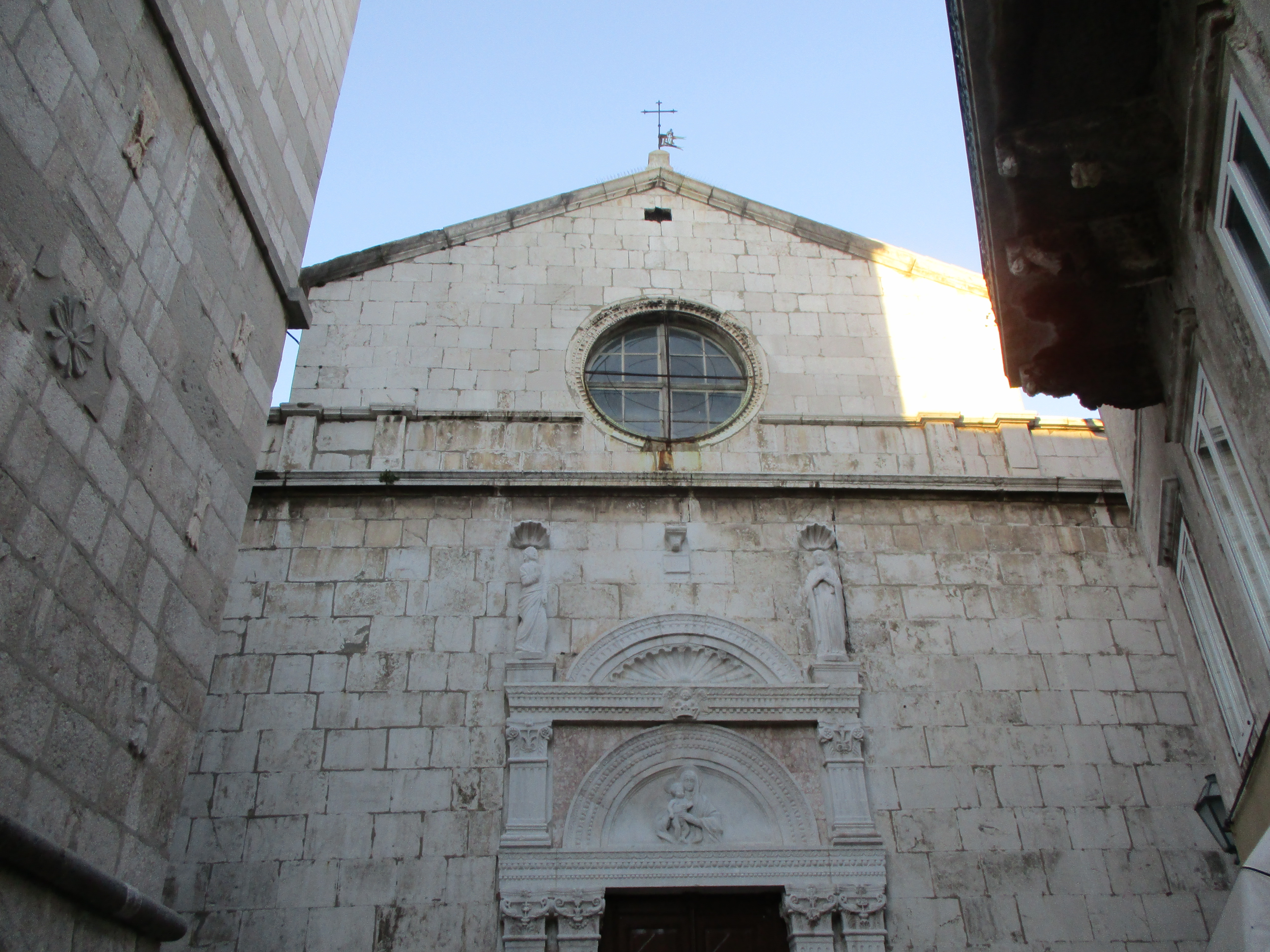

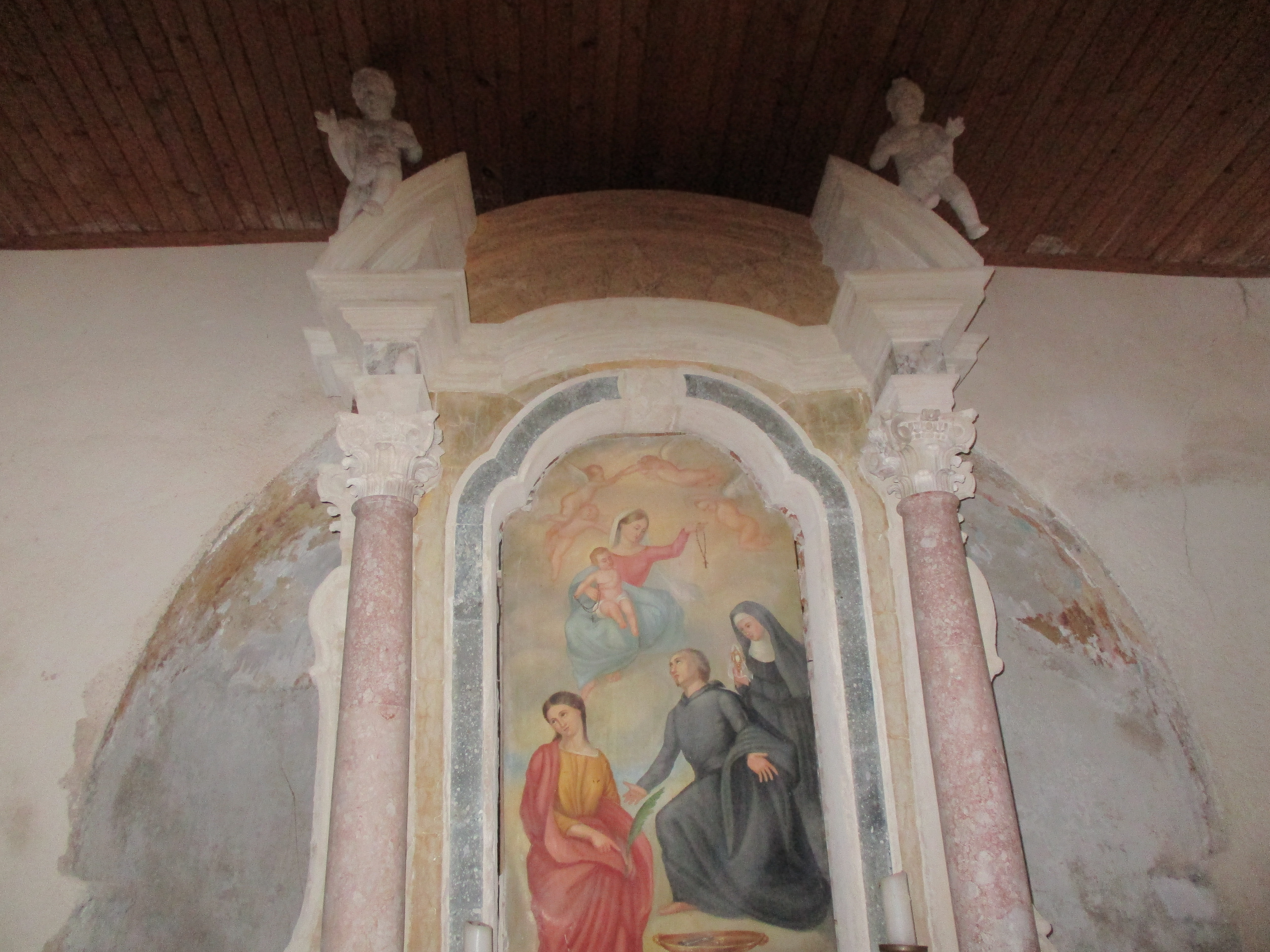

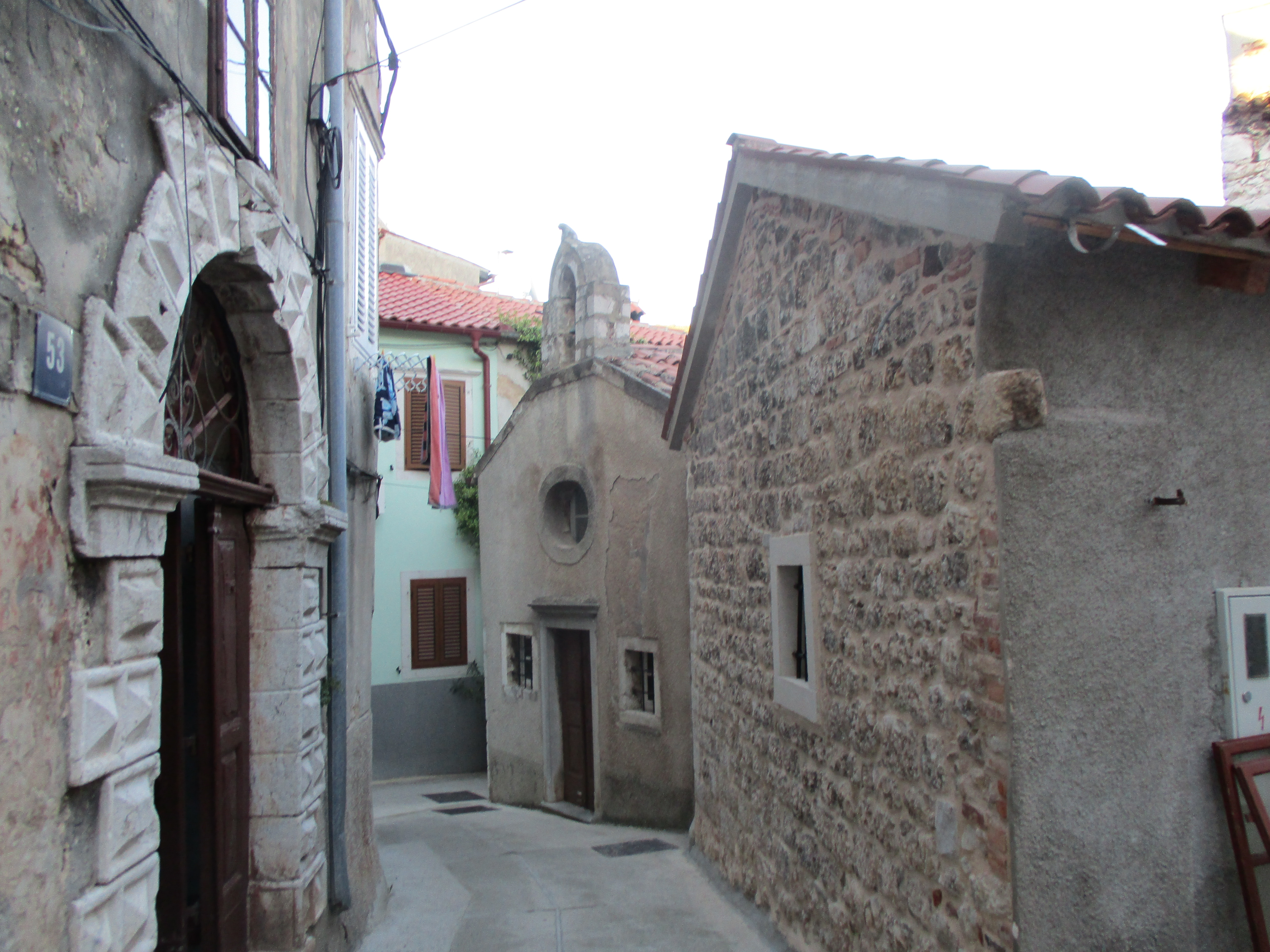

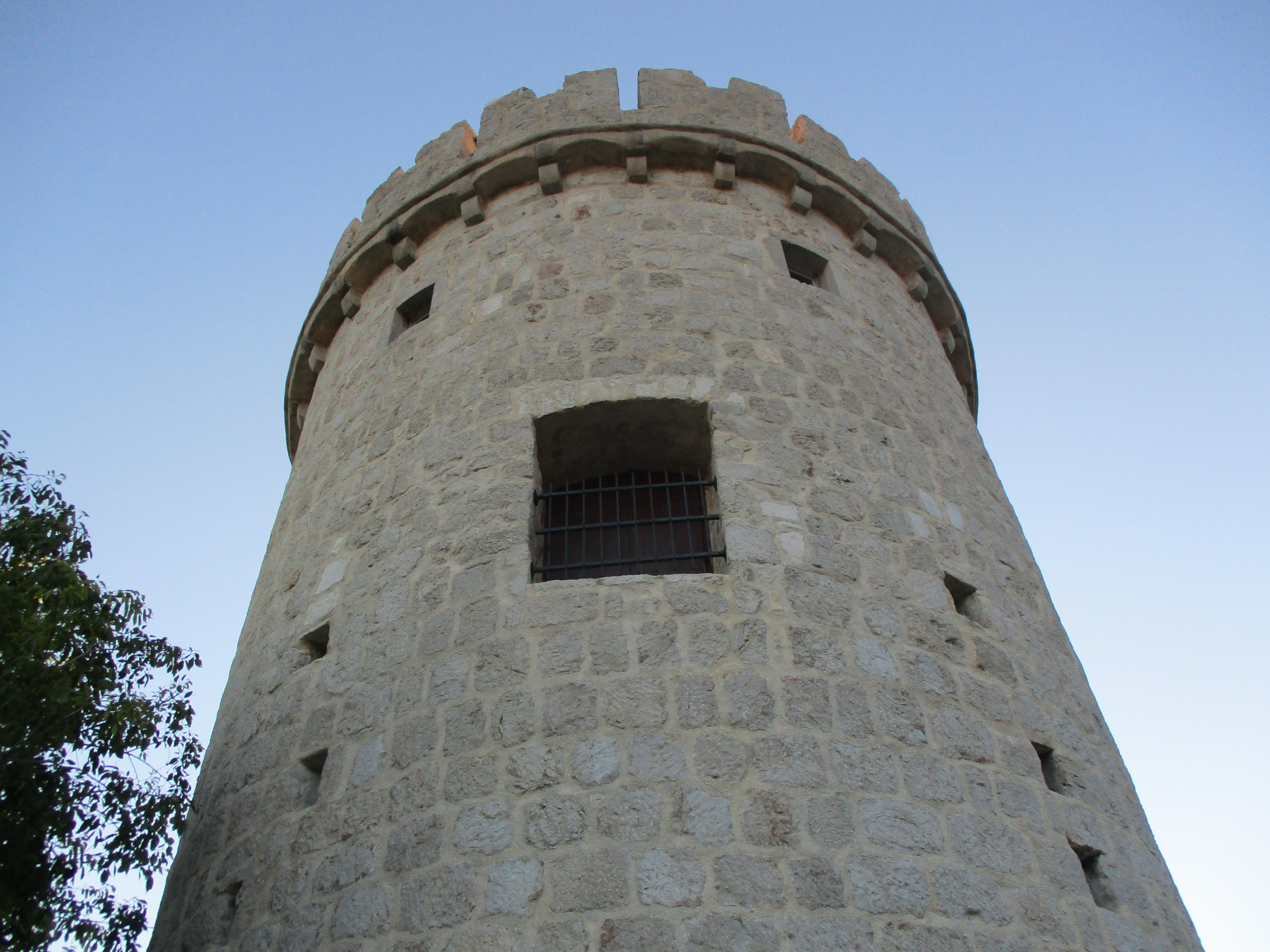

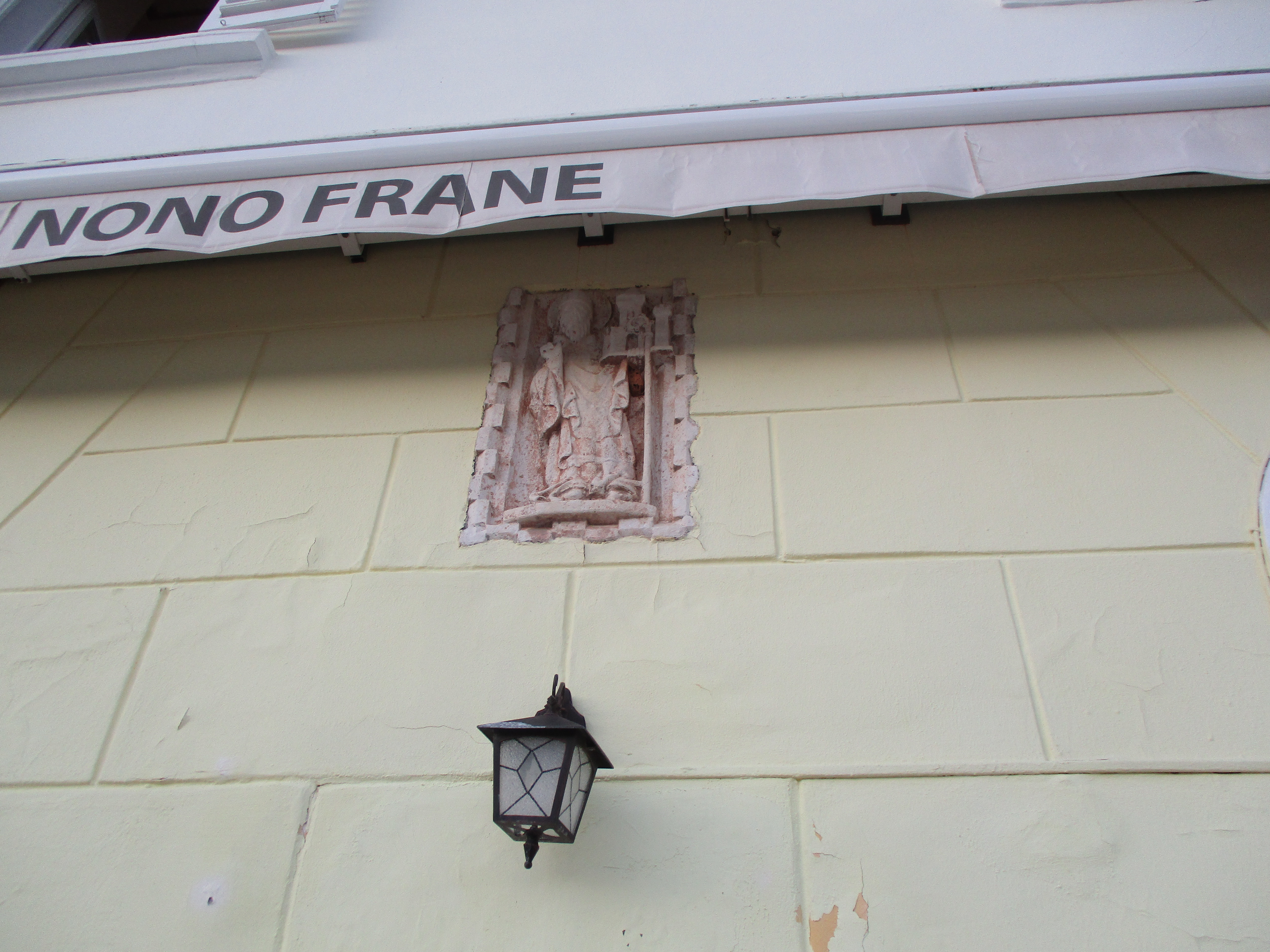

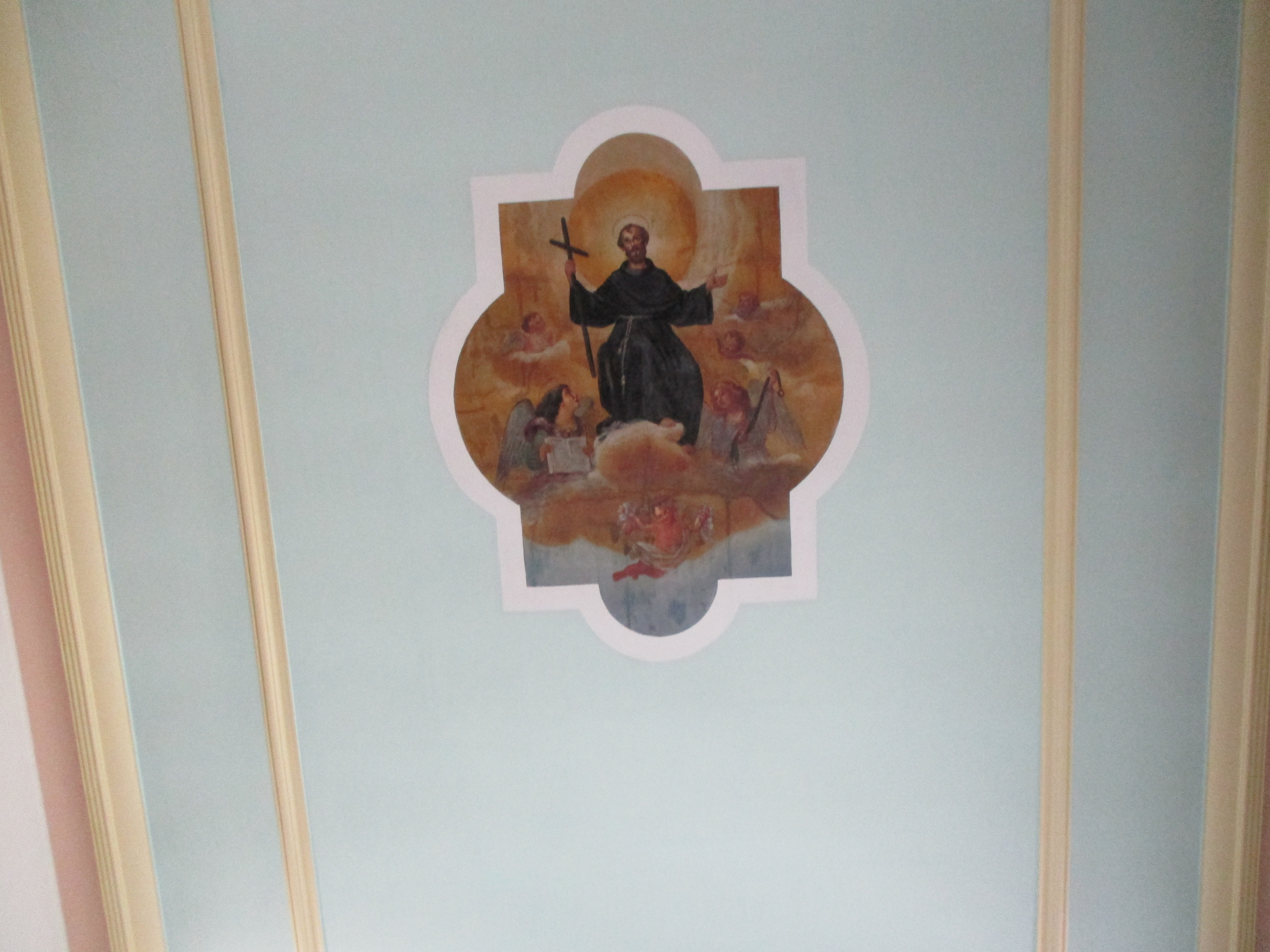

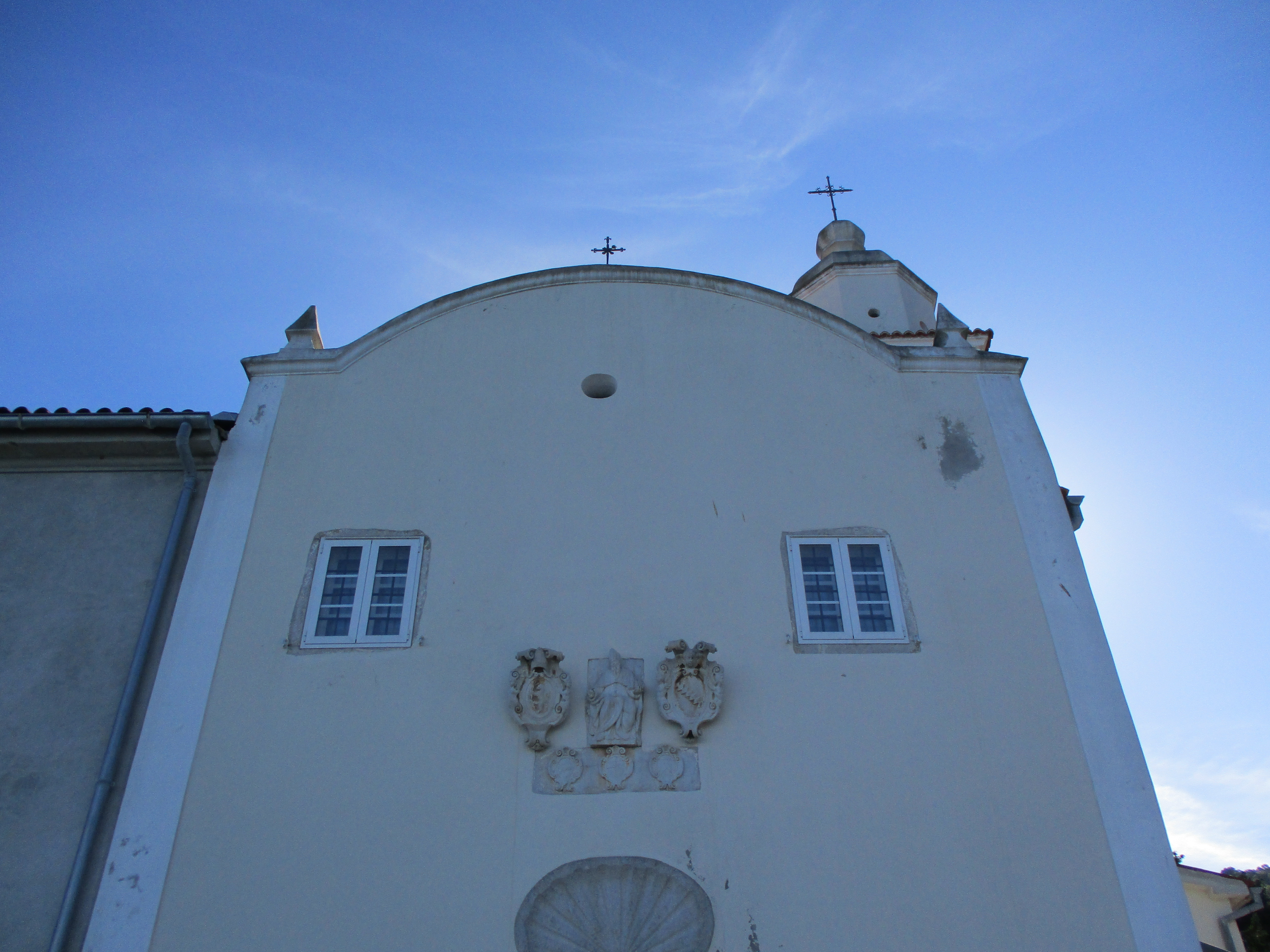

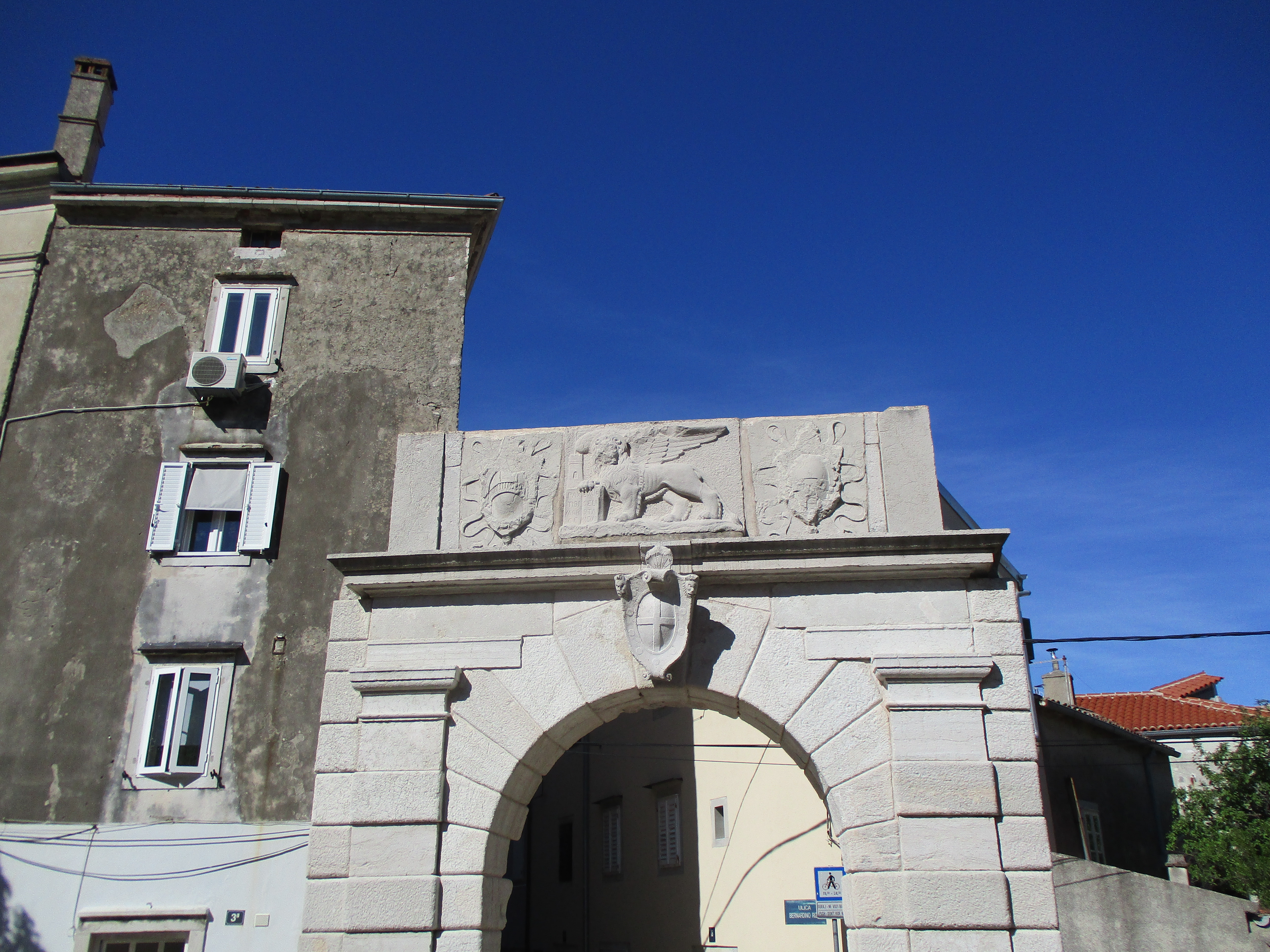

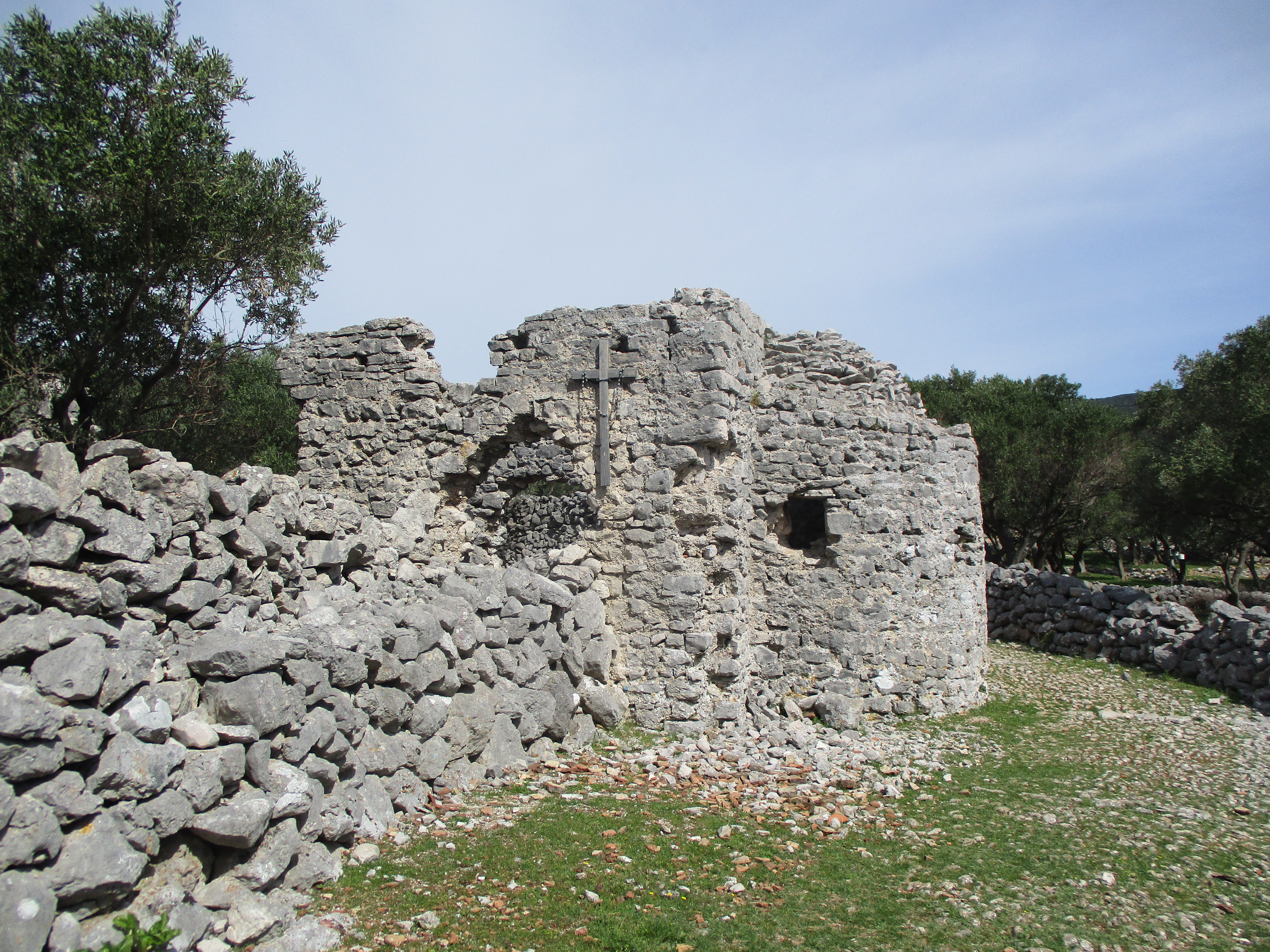

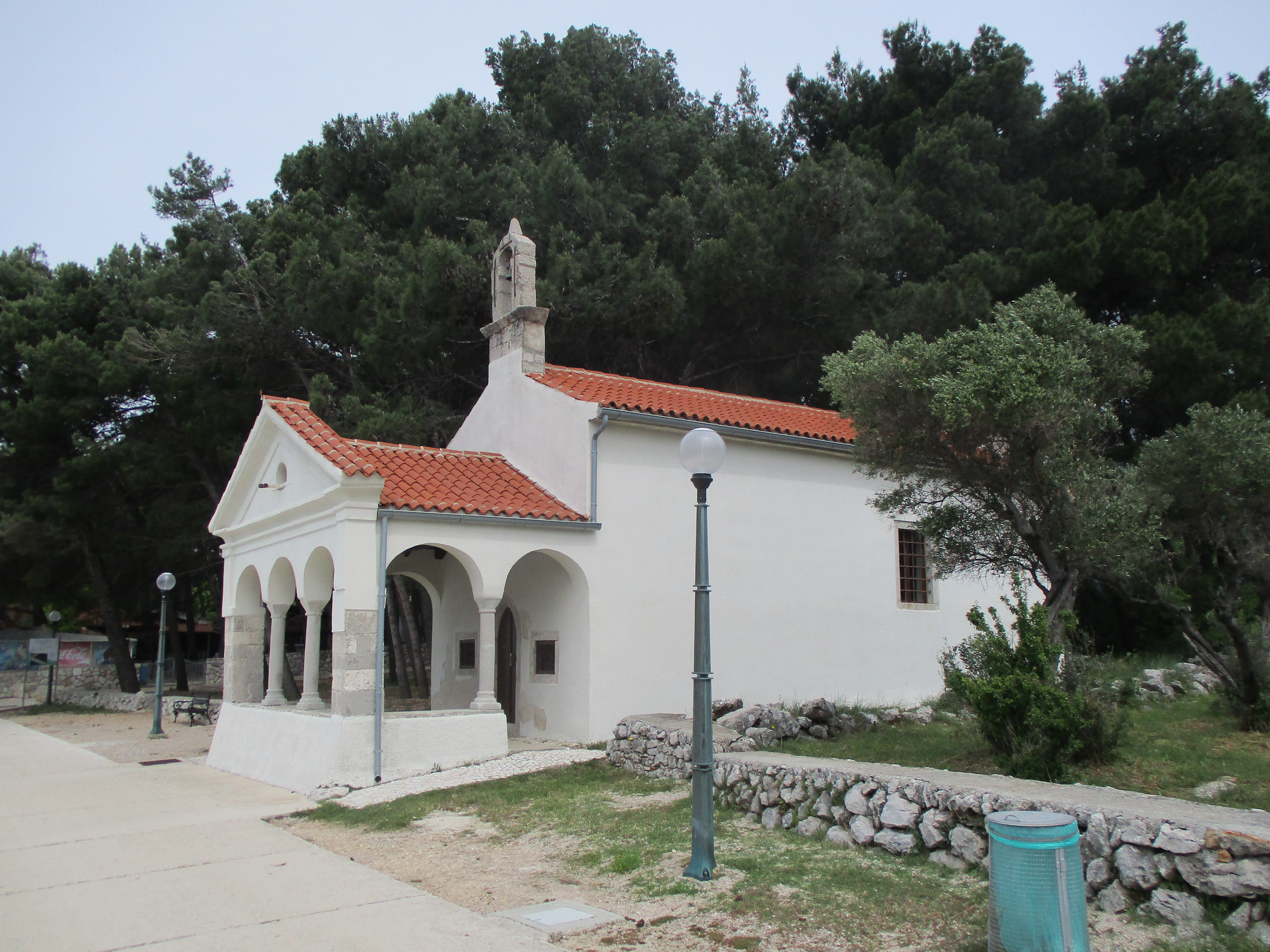

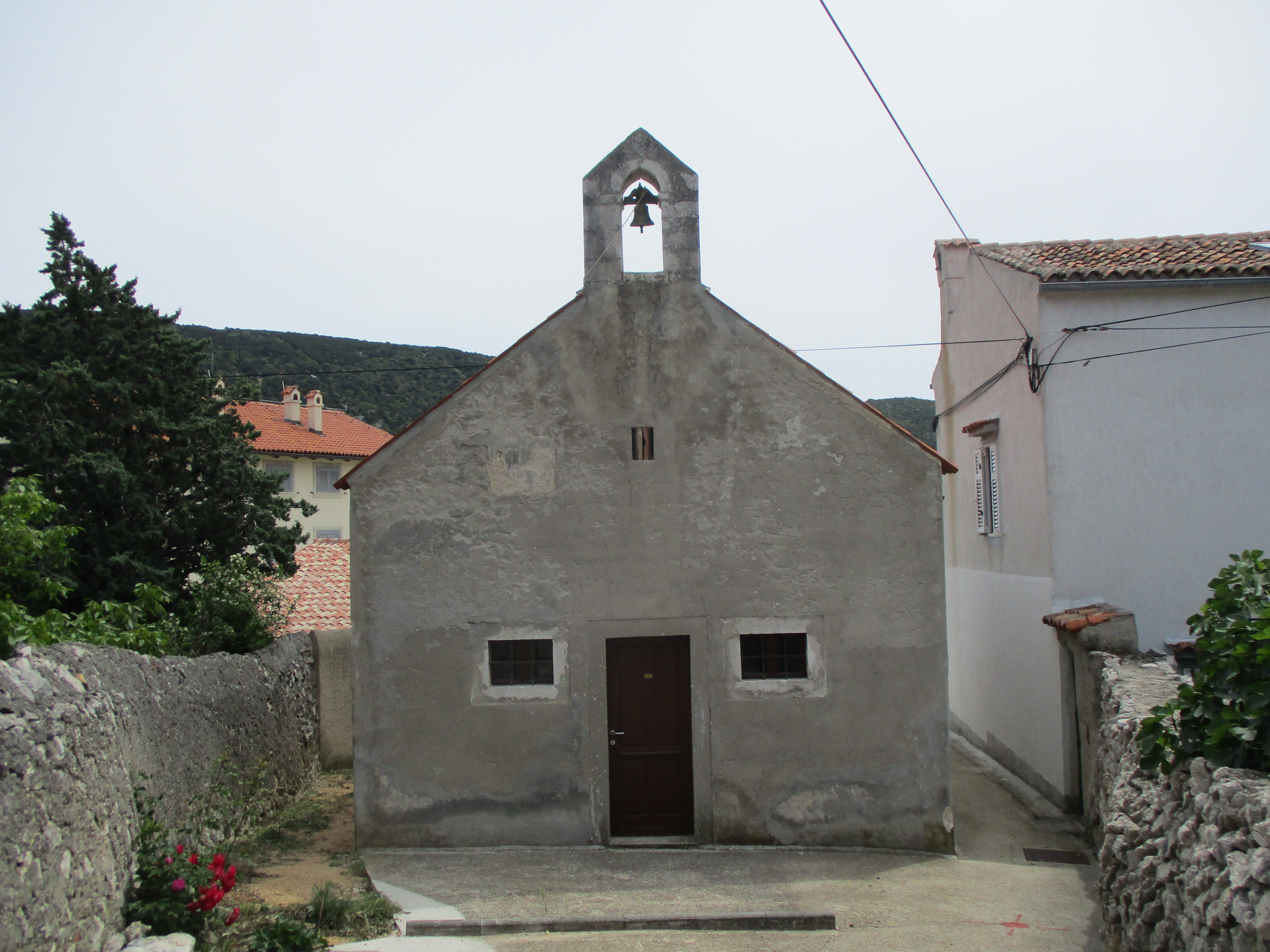

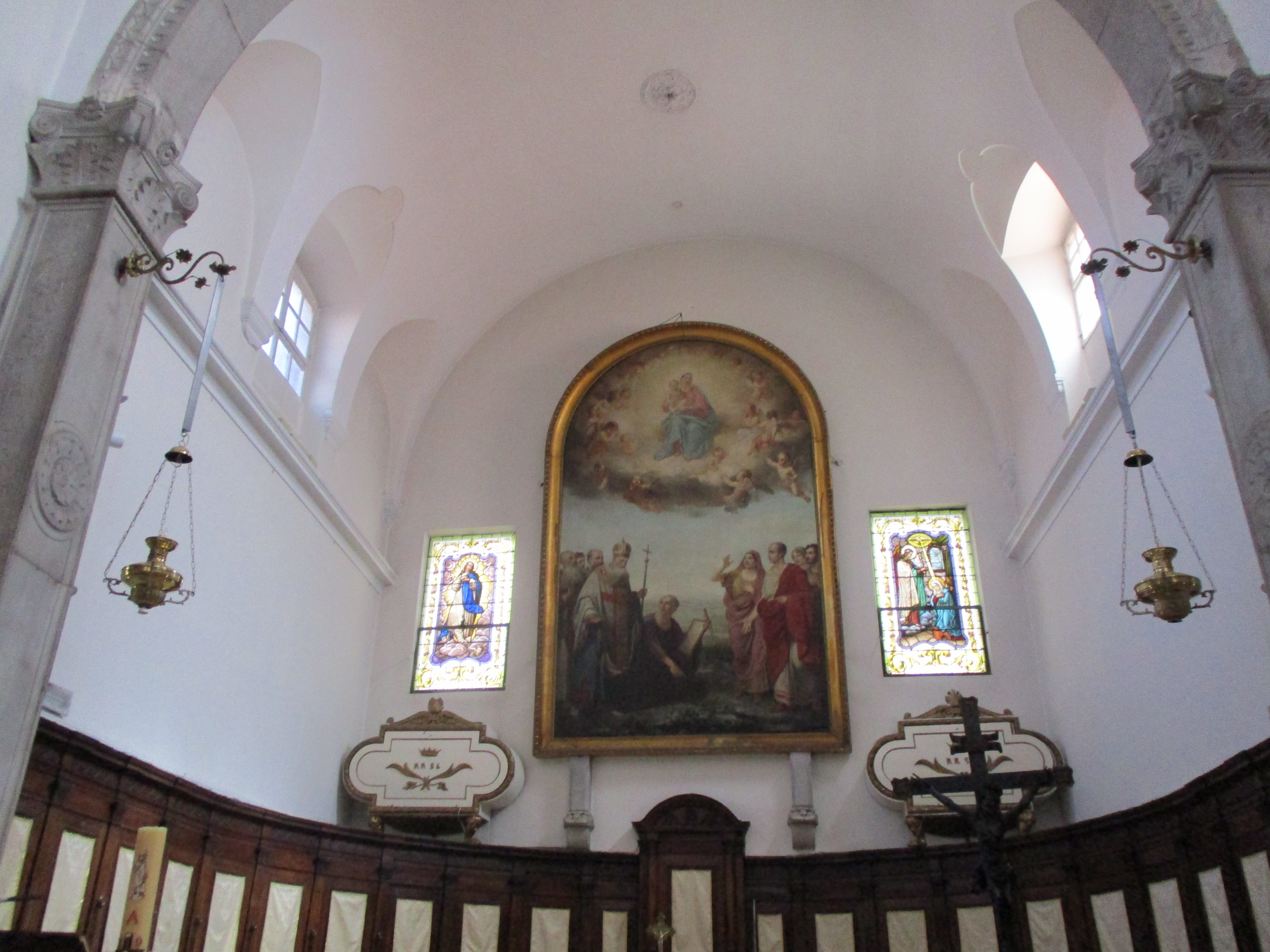

== Bibliography ==
- 1. Luigi Tomaz, La Magnifica Comunità di Cherso, Foreword by Arnaldo Mauri, Conselve, 2010.
