= Postal codes in Croatia =

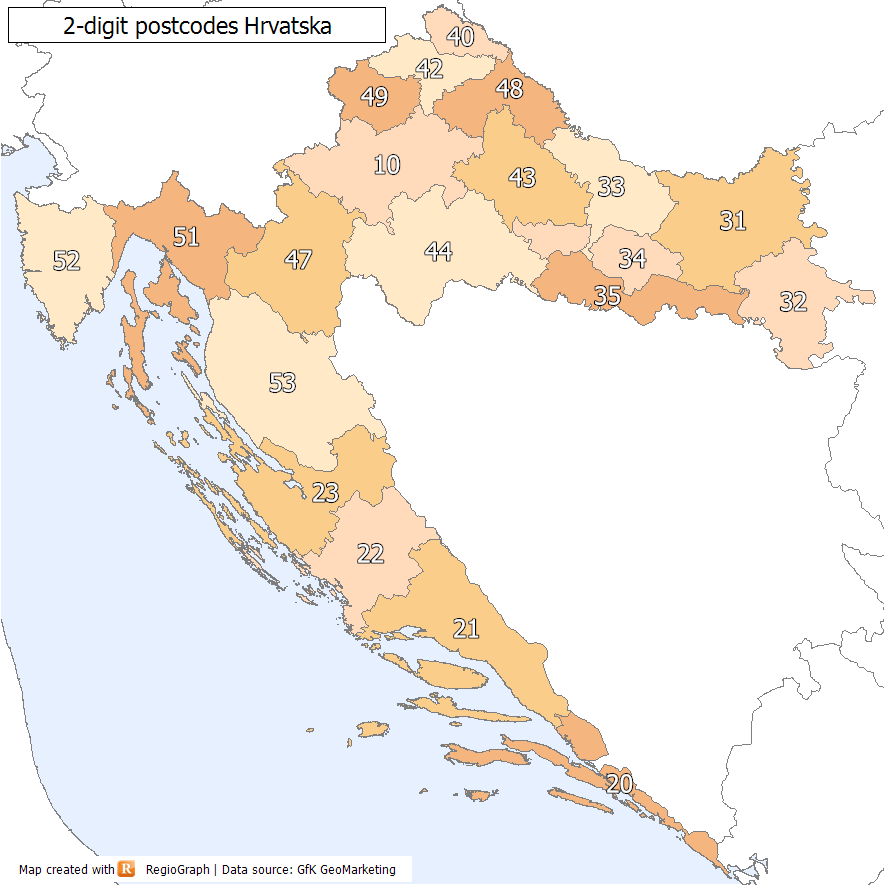
2-digit postcode areas Croatia (defined through the first two postcode digits)

Postal codes in Croatia are 5 digit numeric. There are 20 two digit zones defined. Zagreb City and Zagreb County have one, each other first level administrative country subdivision, i.e. one of the counties of Croatia, has its own range. When sending internationally, it's advisable to prefix the postal code with the ISO 3166-1 alpha-2 code for Croatia (for example: HR-10xxx).

From the 10 possible 1 digit ranges only 5 are assigned:

- 1 Zagreb region,
- 2 Southern Croatia,
- 3 Eastern Croatia,
- 4 Central Croatia except Zagreb region,
- 5 Western Croatia.

In the range 1xxxx only one two digit range namely 10xxx is assigned, the maximum of subranges exists is in the 4xxxx range with 7 ranges.

Range	Location
10xxx	City of Zagreb and Zagreb County
20xxx	Dubrovnik-Neretva County
21xxx	Split-Dalmatia County
22xxx	Šibenik-Knin County
23xxx	Zadar County
31xxx	Osijek-Baranja County
32xxx	Vukovar-Srijem County
33xxx	Virovitica-Podravina County
34xxx	Požega-Slavonia County
35xxx	Brod-Posavina County
40xxx	Međimurje County
42xxx	Varaždin County
43xxx	Bjelovar-Bilogora County
44xxx	Sisak-Moslavina County
47xxx	Karlovac County
48xxx	Koprivnica-Križevci County
49xxx	Krapina-Zagorje County
51xxx	Primorje-Gorski Kotar County
52xxx	Istria County
53xxx	Lika-Senj County

Three cities have a postal code with 4 zeros: 10000 Zagreb, 20000 Dubrovnik, 40000 Čakovec.

Range	City	County
10000	Zagreb	Zagreb County
20000	Dubrovnik	Dubrovnik–Neretva County
21000	Split	Split-Dalmatia County
22000	Šibenik	Šibenik-Knin County
23000	Zadar	Zadar County
31000	Osijek	Osijek-Baranja County
32000	Vukovar	Vukovar-Syrmia County
33000	Virovitica	Virovitica–Podravina County
34000	Požega	Požega-Slavonia County
35000	Slavonski Brod	Brod–Posavina County
40000	Čakovec	Međimurje County
42000	Varaždin	Varaždin County
43000	Bjelovar	Bjelovar–Bilogora County
44000	Sisak	Sisak–Moslavina County
47000	Karlovac	Karlovac County
48000	Koprivnica	Koprivnica-Križevci County
49000	Krapina	Krapina-Zagorje County
51000	Rijeka	Primorje-Gorski Kotar County
52000	Pazin	Istria County
53000	Gospić	Lika-Senj County

== Old system ==
After independence, Croatia went on to use the 5 digit numeric postal codes once assigned to the Socialist Republic of Croatia (within SFR Yugoslavia). The system had assigned the ranges 4xxxx and 5xxxx to the republic.

== See also ==
- List of postal codes in Croatia
- ISO 3166-2:HR
- NUTS of Croatia
- Telephone numbers in Croatia
