= List of self-publishing companies =

Self-publishing is the publication of media (e.g. books, music, art) by its author at their own cost, without the involvement of a publisher. However, the author may engage professionals or companies to assist with various aspects of publication, distribution or marketing. This page lists the best-known of such companies. It is not an exhaustive list.

== Assisted self-publishing ==
Assisted self-publishing companies offer services such as editing, proof-reading, cover design, formatting, printing, marketing and promotion. They may offer these services separately or as a package. They do not take any rights from the author and the author retains total control of the work and decisions relating to it. They also provide higher royalties as compared to traditional publishing houses.

- Blurb, Inc.
- CreateSpace
- Darkside communication group
- DiggyPOD
- FastPencil
- FriesenPress
- Kindle Direct Publishing
- Lightning Source
- Llumina Press
- Lulu
- Notion Press
- Self Publish, Be Happy
- Treering
- Wattpad

== Self-publishing e-book platforms ==
- Amazon's Kindle Direct Publishing
- Apple's App Store (iOS)
- Barnes & Noble
- Blurb, Inc.
- Kobo Writing Life
- Lulu
- Powell's Books
- Scribd
- Smashwords
- Wattpad

=== E-book digital distribution platforms ===
- Amazon Kindle
- Apple Books Store
- Archive of Our Own
- Barnes & Noble Nook
- FanFiction.Net (aka Fiction Press)
- Google Play Books
- Hoopla Digital
- Kindle Direct Publishing
- Kindle Store
- Kobo
- Lulu.com
- NoiseTrade
- OverDrive, Inc.
- PocketBook Reader
- Scribd
- Smashwords
- Wattpad
- Wikibooks
- Writers of the West

==== Discontinued ====
- Oyster
- Pronoun
- Sony Reader

== Print on demand books ==
- BiblioBazaar
- Books LLC
- DiggyPOD
- Lightning Source
- Llumina Press
- Lulu
- Powell's Books

== Self-printing products and custom merchandise ==
- Cafe Press
- Custom Ink
- Redbubble
- Shopify
- Shutterfly
- Spreadshirt
- Teespring
- Vistaprint
- Zazzle

== See also ==
- Amateur press association
- Article processing charge
- Author mill
- Custom media
- Dōjin
- Fan fiction
- Fanzine
- Independent music
- Mimeo Revolution
- Predatory open access publishing
- Print on demand
- Samizdat
- Self Publish, Be Happy
- Self publishing
- Small press
- Vanity award
- Vanity press or vanity publishing
