= Ustrine =

Village in Primorje-Gorski Kotar, Croatia

- Village
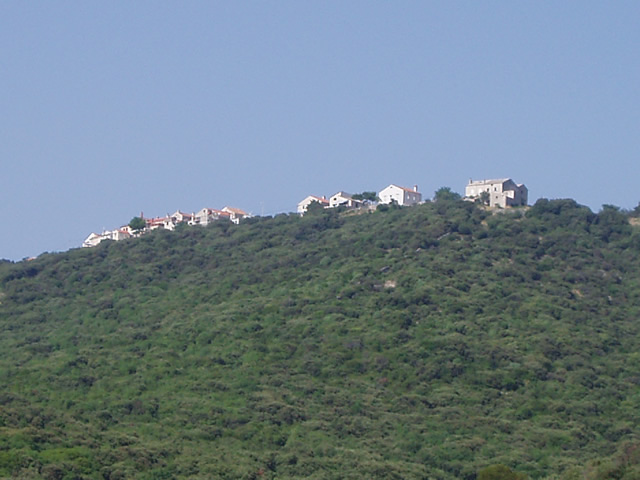
- View of Ustrine

- Location within Croatia
- Coordinates: 44.74516°N 14.40474°E
- Country: Croatia
- County: Primorje-Gorski Kotar
- Town: Mali Lošinj

Area
  - Total: 14.3 km^{2} (5.5 sq mi)

Population (2021)
  - Total: 21
  - Density: 1.5/km^{2} (3.8/sq mi)
- Time zone: UTC+1 (CET)
  - Summer (DST): UTC+2 (CEST)
- Postal code: 51554
- Area code: 051
- Vehicle registration: RI

Ustrine is a village on the Croatian island of Cres, in Primorje-Gorski Kotar. Administratively, it is part of the town of Mali Lošinj. As of 2021, it had a population of 21. It is located 4 km south of Belej.
