= Self Publish, Be Happy =

Organization assisting photographers to self-publish

- Status: Active
- Founded: 2010
- Founder: Bruno Ceschel
- Country of origin: UK
- Headquarters location: Ridley Road, Dalston, London
- Publication types: Books
- Nonfiction topics: Photography
- Official website: www.selfpublishbehappy.com

Self Publish, Be Happy (SPBH) is an organisation founded by Bruno Ceschel in 2010 that aims to help aspiring photographers to self-publish their own books. It does so through workshops, talks, exhibitions, live events, on/offline projects and publicising of books. It is based on Ridley Road, in Dalston, London, where it keeps a library of some 2000 donated self-published zines and books.

Since 2012 Self Publish, Be Happy has also published photography books as SPBH Editions. Ceschel is its director and Antonio de Luca its art director. It has published books by Broomberg & Chanarin, Cristina de Middel, Mariah Robertson, Lorenzo Vitturi and others.

SPBH produces various series of publications—SPBH Book Club, which are sold as part of a yearly subscription as well as sold separately; SPBH Pamphlets, pamphlets with photography and text, including one by Anouk Kruithof; and Self Publish Be Naughty (SPBN), books of intimate pictures of people by their romantic partners.

In November 2015 Ceshel's book Self Publish, Be Happy: A DIY Photobook Manual and Manifesto was published by Aperture.

== Reception ==
Parr and Badger include Self Publish Be Naughty (2011) in the third volume of their photobook history.

Critic Sean O'Hagan, writing in The Guardian, said "An accurate measure of SPBH’s importance to the contemporary cottage industry is the array of photobooks they have featured that I would cite as contemporary classics."

== Publications (selected) ==
- Self Publish Be Naughty. London: Self Publish, Be Happy, 2011. OCLC 777945637. 122 photographs from 75 photographers, and text. Edition of 1000 copies.
- AB&OC. SPBH Book Club Vol. I. By Adam Broomberg & Oliver Chanarin. London: Self Publish, Be Happy, 2012. ASIN B00ECAIIFI. Edition of 250 copies.
- SPBH Book Club Vol. II. By Brad Feuerhelm. London: Self Publish, Be Happy, 2012. Edition of 250 copies.
- SPBH Book Club Vol. III. By Cristina de Middel. London: Self Publish, Be Happy, 2013. ASIN B00D18UQ0C. Edition of 500 copies.
- SPBH Book Club Vol. IV. By Mariah Robertson. London: Self Publish, Be Happy, 2013. ASIN B00K8KVUQK. Edition of 500 copies.
- Dalston Anatomy. By Lorenzo Vitturi.
  - London: Self Publish, Be Happy, 2013. ASIN B00GI7KR6G. Edition of 700 copies.
  - London: Self Publish, Be Happy, 2014. Edition of 1000 copies.
- SPBH Book Club Vol. V. By Esther Teichmann. London: Self Publish, Be Happy, 2014. ASIN B00MP2Y6J2. Edition of 500 copies.
- SPBH Book Club Vol. VI. By Melinda Gibson. London: Self Publish, Be Happy, 2014. Edition of 300 copies.
- SPBH Book Club Vol. VII. By Lucas Blalock. London: Self Publish, Be Happy, 2014. ASIN B00VA3BUB4. Edition of 300 copies.

== Events ==
- 2010: Self Publish, Be Happy Weekend, Photographers' Gallery, London, 5–6 June 2010.
- 2013: Compilation Tokyo, Tokyo, 6–7 April 2013. A SPBH Live event where artists produced a publication live in front of an audience. This event produced Compilation Tokyo (2013) with Itami, Koji Kitagawa, Taisuke Koyama, Shinryo Saeki, Masafumi Shirakami, Hirosh Takagi, Hiroshi Takizawa, Nerhol, Kenji Hirasawa, Daisuke Yokota and Anne Schwalbe.
- 2015: Jimmy Limit with Self Publish, Be Happy, Scotiabank Contact Photography Festival, Toronto, Canada, 2 May 2015.
- 2015: Offprint London, Tate Modern, London, 22–25 May 2015.
- 2015: Business as Usual: Self Publish, Be Happy in Residence, Photographers' Gallery, London, 20–27 November 2015. The SPBH office set up in the gallery, plus daily events.

== Awards ==
Awards received for Self Publish, Be Happy publications:

- 2016: Fire in Cairo (2015) by Matthew Connors won Artist's Book award, Infinity Awards, International Center of Photography, New York, NY

== See also ==
- List of self-publishing companies
- Small press
