= Unije =

Island of Croatia

Coordinates: 44°38′N 14°15′E

Nickname: Unie
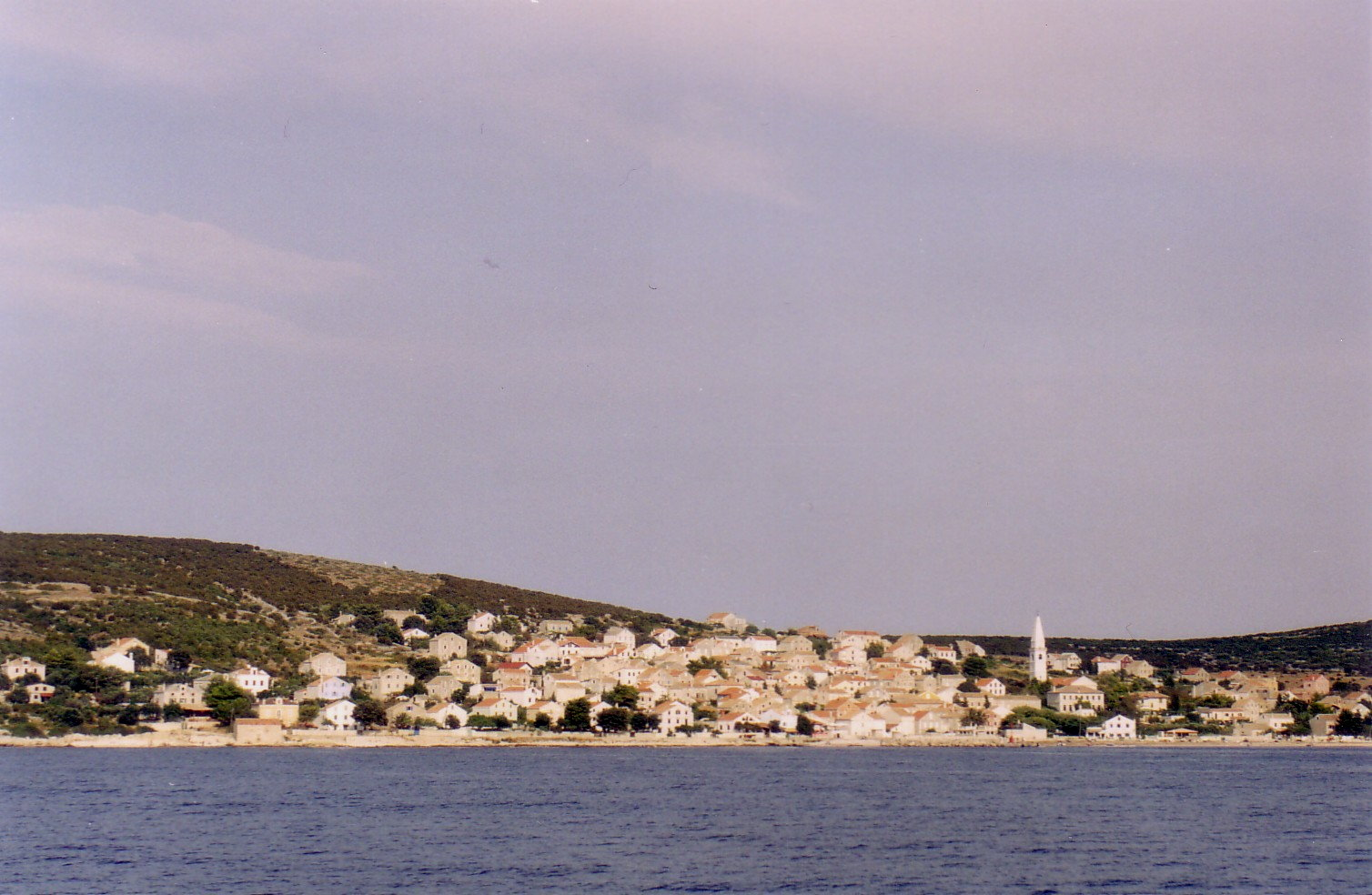
- View of Unije

- Location within Croatia
- Interactive map of Unije

Geography
- Location: Adriatic Sea, Kvarner Bay
- Archipelago: Cres-Lošinj archipelago
- Area: 16.88 km^{2} (6.52 sq mi)
- Coastline: 38.059 km (23.6488 mi)

Administration
- Croatia
- County: Primorje-Gorski Kotar County
- Capital and largest city: Unije (pop. 66)

Demographics
- Population: 66 (2021)
- Pop. density: 3.90/km^{2} (10.1/sq mi)

Additional information
- Vehicle registration: RI

Unije (pronounced [ûːnijɛ]; Italian: Unie) is an island in Croatia. It is part of the Cres-Lošinj archipelago, which is situated at the northern portion of the Adriatic Sea.

== Geography ==
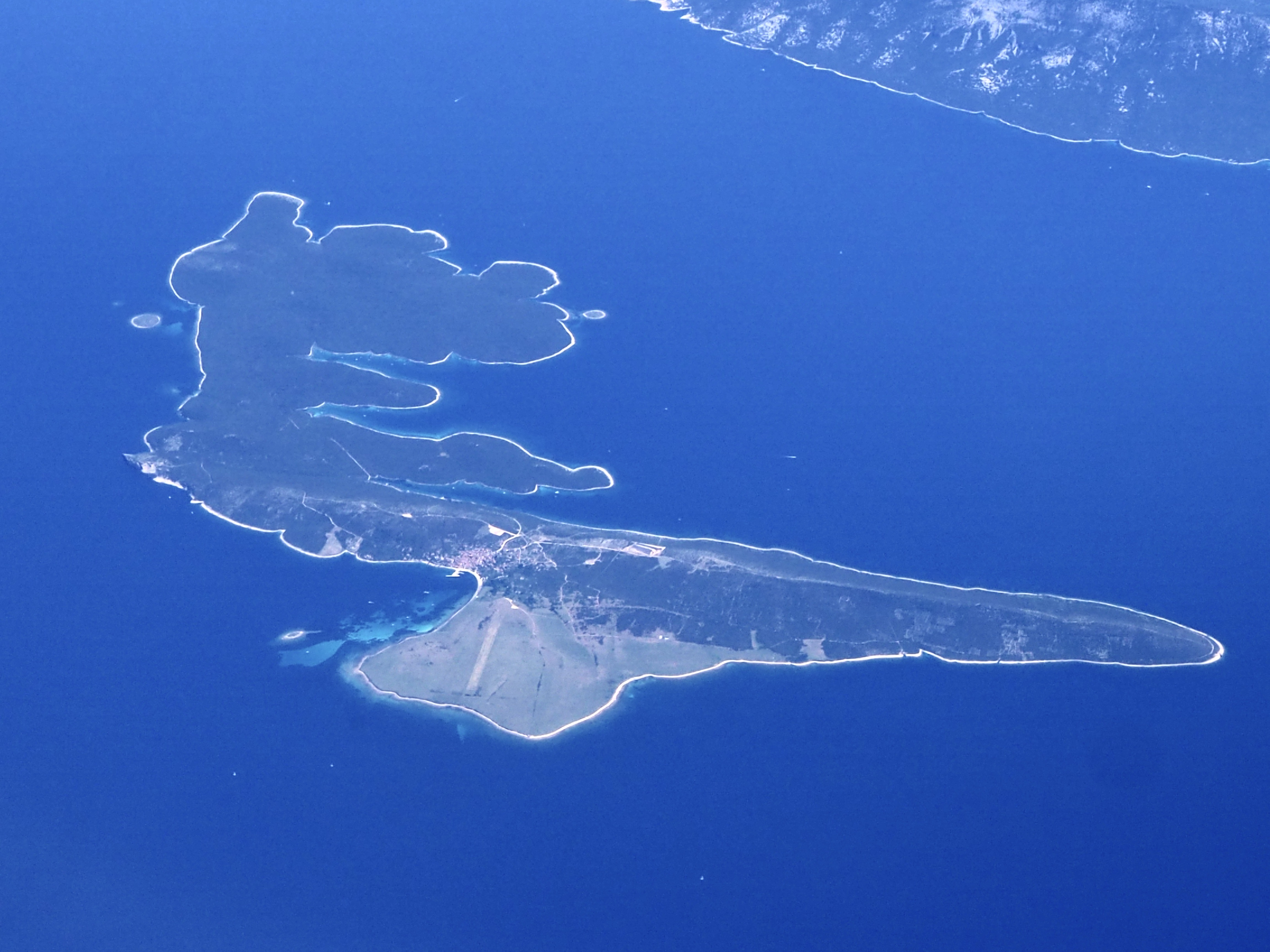
Aerial view

Unije is the third largest island of the archipelago. It is 16.92 square kilometres (6.53 square miles) in size, with numerous bays and beaches. Low hills abut the shoreline and are covered with Mediterranean evergreen macchia trees and olive trees. Administratively, it is part of the town of Mali Lošinj. As of 2021, it had a population of 66.

The only settlement on the island of Unije bears the same name. It is a typical fishing and farming village which contains 280 houses. The houses are positioned on a gentle slope located on a western cove of the island. Because of its openness, the port of Unije does not provide good shelter during strong storms, especially those originating from the west and northwest. During severe weather, small fishing and pleasure boats have to be pulled out onto the pebbly beach while larger boats need to be moored in one of the sheltered bays on the eastern side of the island.

The year-round population of Unije is less than 85 residents and grows to more than 400 residents during the summer tourist season. Passenger ship service provides daily connections to the nearby islands of Susak and Mali Lošinj as well as the mainland cities of Rijeka and Pula. Unije also has an airport that serves private and commercial aircraft. A sky bus service connects Unije to Mali Lošinj.

== Bibliography ==
=== Name ===
- Šenoa, Milan (1949). "Prilog poznavanju starih naziva naših otoka" [A Contribution to Learning the Old Names of Our Islands]. Hrvatski geografski glasnik (in Serbo-Croatian) (11–12) (published 1950-06-15): 75–82. ISSN 1331-5854.

=== Biology ===
- Šašić, Martina; Nahirnić, Ana; Tarmann, Gerhard M. (2016-12-31). "Zygaenidae (Lepidoptera) in the Lepidoptera collections of the Croatian Natural History Museum". Natura Croatica: Periodicum Musei Historiae Naturalis Croatici. 25 (2): 233–248. doi:10.20302/NC.2016.25.19. eISSN 1848-7386.

=== Demographics ===
- Magaš, Damir; Faričić, Josip; Lončarić, Robert (2006-12-01). "Geografske osnove društveno-gospodarske revitalizacije Unija" [Geographical Basis of Socio-Economic Revitalization of Unije Island, Croatia]. Geoadria (in Serbo-Croatian). 11 (2): 173–239. eISSN 1848-9710.

=== Genealogy ===
- Karcich, Grant (2016-11-30). The History and Families of Unije: A Compiled History and Family Genealogies for the Island of Unije, Croatia. Plantation: Llumina Press. ISBN 978-1625504609.

=== Infrastructure ===
- Magaš, Damir (1993-09-01). "Cestovne prometnice malih jadranskih otoka" [The Local Roads on the Little Adriatic Islands]. Hrvatski geografski glasnik (in Serbo-Croatian). 55: 151–154. ISSN 1331-5854.
