= Antonio de Luca =

Antonio de Luca or De Luca may refer to:

- Antonio De Luca (bishop) (born 1956), Italian Catholic bishop
- Antonio de Luca (artist) (born 1975), Canadian artist
