= David Rakoff bibliography =

A list of works and writings by Canadian author David Rakoff:

== Non-fiction essays and articles ==
- "The Waiting" (The New York Times, 15 April 2011)
- "My first New York" (New York Magazine, 29 March 2010)
- "All the time we have: When your therapist dies, well, how does that make you feel?" (Guilt & pleasure)
- "Pardon me: my childhood bullying and an attempt to atone for it" (Tablet, September 23, 2009)
- "Why "Brüno" is bad for the gays". Salon. July 9, 2009. Archived from the original on May 17, 2012.
- "Our True North". The New York Times. July 1, 2009.
- "Not a pet person" (O Magazine, May 12, 2009)
- "Utah and the insane optimism of westward expansion" (Slate, September 10, 2008)
- "The worst gay job in America" (Newmatilda.com, August 22, 2008)
- "Walk This Way" (New York Times, August 16, 2008)
- "The Future Knocks Again" (New York Times, July 10, 2008)
- "Places and prices: Canadian Maritimes" (Condé Nast Traveller, March 2008)
- "Northern Composure" (Conde Nast Traveller, March 2008)
- "Love it or leave it, book excerpt" (Newsweek, January 20, 2008)
- "Oh, the trouble I've Heard" (Guilt & Pleasure, Issue 5, Summer 2007)
- "A Basket Case in North Carolina" (New York Times, May 20, 2007)
- "Annie Hall" (Five Dials, No 3, 2007)
- King of the Forest (Tablet, December 6, 2006)
- "Streets of Sorrow" (Conde Nast Traveller, November 2006)
- "Shrimp"(Richard Hugo House, October 14, 2006)
- "75 Years: Voice and views: 'Reminders of the divine'" (The New York Times, April 23, 2006)
- "Whatsizface: two Beverly Hills plastic surgeons showed me the promise of a perfect face". Salon. November 29, 2005. Archived from the original on May 5, 2010.
- "He's Not Dead Yet" (Outside, July 2005)
- "Stations of the Crawl" (New York Magazine, May 21, 2005)
- "2003: The 3rd annual Year in Ideas; Makeup for men" (New York Times, December 14, 2003)
- "Skin Crawling: David Rakoff faces off with the plastic surgeons of Beverly Hills" (GQ, October 2004)
- "Hiroshima Bomber and Victims: This Is Your (Puppet's) Life" (New York Times, January 11, 2004)
- "The Lives They Lived : Celebrity Bushman" (New York Times, December 28, 2003)
- "Stores: the economy of cool" (New York Times, May 18, 2003)
- "Places and prices: British Columbia Lodges" (Conde Nast Traveller, March 2003)
- "Evergreen Safari" (Conde Nast Traveller, March 2003)
- "Fu Fighters" (Outside, 2003)
- "The Lives They lived: The Debutante's Staying-In Party" (New York Times, December 29, 2002)
- "The Year in Ideas: Gizmo-finding gizmo" (December 15, 2002)
- "What scares me: (fear of) being buried alive" (Outside, September 2002)
- "Edie Falco's endless summer" (New York Times, July 7, 2002)
- "The Year in Ideas: Unexamined Life is Worth Living, The" (December 15, 2002, New York Times)
- "An Interview with The Artist: Eric Fischl" (New York Art World, October 27, 2002)
- "The Year in Ideas: A to Z; focus on the negative" (New York Times, December 9, 2001)
- "The Lives They Lived: 01-07-01: Mark R. Hughes, b. 1956; Death Be Not a Punch Line" (New York Times, January 7, 2001)
- "Barbra's farewell: A city Verklempt" (Observer, October 1, 2000)
- "I, Nature Boy" (Outside, October 2000)
- "The love that dare not squeak its name: Even as a child I suspected I had something special in common with Stuart Little" (Salon, December 21, 1999) Letter to the editor including a measured response to article (Salon, December 21, 1999)
- "The Writer's Life: A titan of American letters reflects on his timeless art and the sacrifices it exacts". Salon. November 9, 1999. Archived from the original on May 17, 2012.
- "Lives: Pandora's idiot box" (New York Times, July 18, 1999)
- "Glorious Gwyneth". Salon. April 2, 1999. Archived from the original on April 19, 2009.
- "Deep Thought Oprah, That Carabiner Won't Hold: Paul Stoltz explains by anybody who isn't a climber is, well, a loser" (Outside, October 1998)
- "Smells Like Tina Spirit" (New York Magazine, October 12, 1998) *"Online diary" (Slate, May 1998)
- "The Critic's Eye: A Rise Is a Rise Is a Rise" (New York Magazine, April 13, 1998)
- "The wizards of Id". Salon. June 13, 1997. Archived from the original on February 10, 2011.
- "A former smoker cheers" (New York Times, April 14, 1995)
- "Up. Down. Up. Down. Up. Down. Up. Down. And Then, By Golly, Up Again" (Outside, March 1998)
- "About men: extraordinary alien" (New York Times, October 9, 1994)

== Fiction or satire ==
- "If Gore had won, an alternate oral history of the last decade" (Newsweek, 2010)
- "Other Newfound Bloomberg FANS" (New York Magazine, November 20, 2005)
- "KringleTech Worldwide Restates Earnings Existence of CEO Still in Doubt as Key Holiday Season Approaches" (Money, CNN, December 1, 2002.
- "Relations: Friends and allies across the divide; Merce Cunningham and Nam June Paik" (New York Times, July 16, 2000)
- "Lives; 'Sometimes you get wistful about actually looking like a person'" (New York Times, January 9, 2000)
- "The Lives They Lived: Questions for James B Maas; Candid Classroom" (New York Times, January 2, 2000)
- "The few. The brave. The capitalists" (Outside, June 1999)
- "If the starr report were a novel, work of history, subject of moral philosophy, psychiatric case study or soap opera, WHAT KIND OF FOOTPRINT WOULD IT LEAVE?" (Outside, June 1999)
- "The Annotated Manifesto of Troop 109: The skills a boy acquires in scouting last a lifetime, without parole" (Outside, November 1998)
- "Poet....Lover....Omnivore....Friend: A consideration of Bart the Bear, from those whose lives he's touched" (Outside, August 1998)
- "Chekhov, Marx and synergy". Salon. 1998.
- "The 1998 Outside Prognosticator" (Outside, January 1998)
- "El Nino has a Headache" (Outside, December 1997)
- Rakoff, David (August 12, 1997). "Media circus: What's up, Dike?". Salon. Archived from the original on August 11, 2012.
- "The kiss-up: a writer and his agent discuss literary strategy" (Salon, March 3, 1997)
- "The Making of Fatal Death" (Outside, March 2000)
- "Love, Dishonor, Marry, Die, Cherish, Perish: A Novel" (Doubleday, July 16, 2013)

== Blog entries ==
The following entries in a blog about watching 28 Woody Allen movies in 28 days appeared in Tablet:

- "Deconstructing Harry and Crimes and Misdemeanors…That's All, Folks!" (January 13, 2007)
- "Interiors and Stardust Memories" (January 10, 2007)
- "Zelig and The Front" (January 10, 2007)
- "Take The Money and Run and What's Up, Tiger Lily?" (January 8, 2007)
- "A Midsummer Night's Sex Comedy" and Another Woman (January 4, 2007)
- "Manhattan" (January 7, 2007)
- "Husbands and Wives and Hannah and Her Sisters" (January 3, 2007)
- "Bananas and Sleeper" (January 1, 2007)
- "Wild Man Blues and (not) Sweet and Lowdown" (January 2, 2007)
- "Radio Days and Broadway Danny Rose" (December 31, 2006)
- "Bullets Over Broadway and Everyone Says I Love You" (December 28, 2006)
- "Love and Death and Everything You Always Wanted to Know About Sex (But Were Afraid To Ask)" (December 27, 2006)
- "Mighty Aphrodite and Manhattan Murder Mystery" (December 26, 2006)
- "Play It Again, Sam and The Purple Rose of Cairo" (December 24, 2006) ()
- "Annie Hall" (December 22, 2006)
- "I've been trying to remember, was it the Sorrow and the Pity?" (December 21, 2006)

== Radio work ==
The following episodes of This American Life feature work by David Rakoff:

- 389: Frenemies – Speak now or forever hold your peace (September 11, 2009): Rakoff demonstrates—in rhyme—how to make a wedding toast for people you never wanted to see married in the first place
- 386: Fine print – Occupancy may be revoked(July 24, 2009): Rakoff drafts a legal agreement between a mother and son
- 354: Mistakes were made – You're Willing to Sacrifice Our Love (April 11, 2009): Rakoff provides a re-interpretation of the famous William Carlos Williams poem
- 345: Ties that bind – Fred and Barney (December 14, 2007): Rakoff as Barney's friend Fred
- 343: Poultry slam 07 – The Meaning of a Bird(November 23, 2007): Rakoff explains how his life was changed – in a single evening – in a room of 5000 chickens
- 328: What I learned from television – 29 (May 2, 2008): Rakoff attempts to watch 29 hours of television in one week
- 305: The 'This American Life' Holiday Spectacular – Twas the Morning After (December 22, 2006): A Christmas poem by David Rakoff
- 259: Promised land – Life in the Fast Lane (September 30, 2005): Rakoff fasts
- 248: Like it or not – Prologue (August 12, 2005): Rakoff on an inevitable experience as a strange, round limbed, feminine little kid
- 208: Office politics – Sheetcakes in the Conference Room, Whiskey After Dark(March 15, 2002): Rakoff discusses work celebrations
- 194: Before and After – Watching from the River's Edge(September 21, 2001): Rakoff discusses another disaster
- 192: Meet the pros – Martha, My Dear (September 14, 2007): Rakoff goes to Martha Stewart's
- 169: Pursuit of Happiness – One Man's Treasure Is Another Man's Trash (September 29, 2000): Rakoff goes on a scavenger hunt
- 156: What Remains – I Used To Bank Here But That Was Long, Long Ago (March 31, 2000): Rakoff tries to track down his semen
- 146: Urban Nature – Interpretation of Dreams (December 10, 1999): Rakoff looks for hidden people in Iceland
- 140: Family Business – What's a Grecian Urn? (September 23, 1999): Rakoff on a Greek-owned icecream parlour
- 124: Welcome to America – What Do Arnold Schwarzenegger and Sigmund Freud Have In Common? (July 5, 2002): Rakoff reports on importing Austrian teachers
- 118: What You Lookin' At? – Climb every mountain (March 19, 1999): Rakoff climbs a mountain in plastic shoes on Christmas day and everyone is looking at him
- 65: Who's Canadian? – White like me (May 30, 1997): Rakoff on how he tried to pass as an American
- 47: Christmas and Commerce (December 20, 1996): Rakoff's Christmas Freud

Rakoff also appeared on the following radio program:

- Contribution to "Tales of Terror" Weekend America (October 25, 2008)* Wire tap CBC RadioOne Season 6, Into America and Season 5: Buzz pick up the phone: the best of season 5

== Other media ==
- David Rakoff on Disney's New Dream Home for The New York Times
- Post-it note reading series – Seasons
- Animated excerpt from the book Don't Get Too Comfortable
