= Antonio de Luca (artist) =

- Born: Antonio Enrico de Luca; August 24, 1975 (age 50); Toronto, Ontario, Canada
- Education: OCAD University
- Known for: Creative direction, art direction, editorial design, long-form journalism
- Notable work: Self Publish, Be Happy, Five Dials, The Walrus
- Awards: Art Directors Club, Society of Publication Design, Society for News Design, Time, The Guardian, Photo-Eye, American Illustration - American Photography, Communication Arts, Advertising & Design Club of Canada, Canadian National Magazine Awards
- Website: www.antoniodeluca.com

Antonio de Luca (born August 24, 1975) is a Canadian creative director and photobook designer based in New York. He is an assistant editor and visual columnist at The New York Times.

In 2010 de Luca partnered with Bruno Ceschel's organisation Self Publish, Be Happy as art director to design, promote and publish self-published photobooks. In 2013 he became the art director and designer of Five Dials a digital literary magazine published in London by Hamish Hamilton.

As art director for Self Publish, Be Happy de Luca was awarded Best Photography Books of 2012 by The Guardian, The Best Books of 2012 by Photo-Eye and Time's Best of 2012: The Photobooks We Loved. He has also curated Follow Me for Either/And commissioned by The National Media Museum London, on humankind's desire to follow.

De Luca is the founder and curator of an international illustration exhibition called The 100 $HOW™.

== Publications ==
- Self Publish Be Naughty. London: Self Publish, Be Happy, 2011.
- American Photography 27. 2012. ISBN 978-1-886212-36-7.
- Geneva Test by Adrien Guillet. 2012. ISBN 978-2-9700713-6-5.
- SPBH Vol I by Adam Broomberg & Oliver Chanarin. London: Self Publish, Be Happy, 2012.
- SPBH Vol. II by Brad Feuerhelm. London: Self Publish, Be Happy, 2012.
- SPBH Vol. III by Cristina De Middel. London: Self Publish, Be Happy, 2013.
- Occupy São Paulo by Carlos Cazalis. ISBN 978-3-86828-400-3, 2013.
- SPBH Vol. IV by Mariah Robertson. London: Self Publish, Be Happy, 2013.
- Fire in Cairo by Matthew Connors. SPBH Editions, London, 2015.
