= Josip Kašman =

Italian opera singer

- Born: 14 July 1850; Lussinpiccolo (present-day Mali Lošinj, Croatia)
- Died: 11 February 1925 (aged 74); Rome, Italy
- Other names: Giuseppe Kaschmann; Joseph Kaschmann
- Occupation: Opera singer (baritone)
- Years active: 1869–1921

Joseph Kaschmann, known also as Giuseppe Kaschmann and Josip Kašman (14 July 1850 – 11 February 1925), was a noted Austrian-Italian operatic baritone. He sang in Europe and America during the latter decades of the 19th century and the early years of the 20th century.

== Singing career and recordings ==
Born on Lussinpiccolo (present-day Mali Lošinj, Croatia), Giuseppe Kaschmann was said to be the youngest of 14 children born to an Austrian father and a local Italian-speaking mother, Eugenia Ivancich. Possessed of a fine natural voice and a facility with languages, he abandoned a planned career in the law, to study singing instead with Ivan Zajc in Zagreb.

His first public performance occurred in Zagreb during 1869. He was then cast in the lead role in a production of the first full scale Croatian opera, Mislav, on October 2, 1870. Six years later he made his Italian operatic debut at Turin (in Gaetano Donizetti's La favorita). Engagements in Venice, Rome, Bologna and Trieste followed. Before long, he had established himself as one of the best baritones in Italy, making an impressive debut at La Scala, Milan, in 1878 in Don Carlo. It was during this phase of his career that he seems to have altered his name from Joseph Kaschmann to Giuseppe Kaschmann for theatrical purposes.

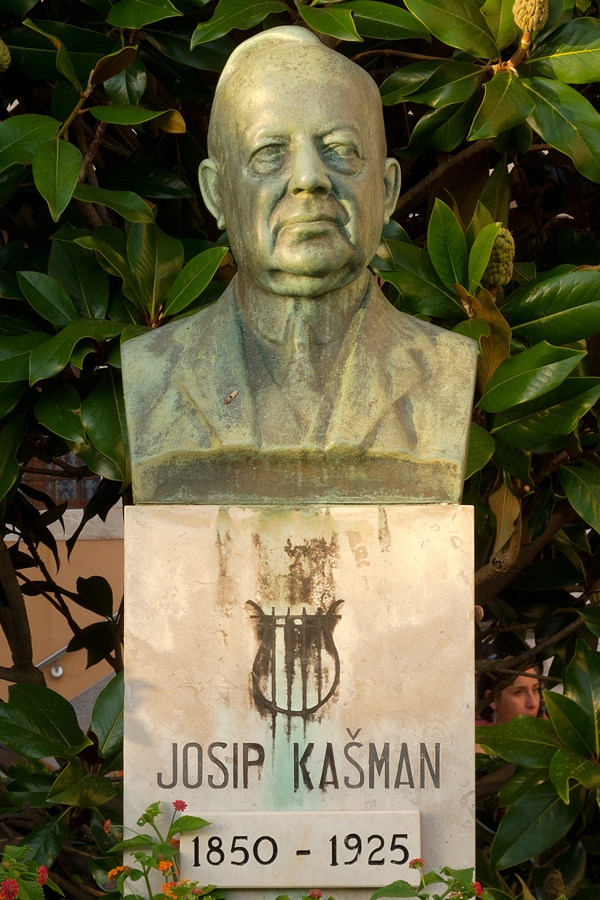
Bust of Giuseppe Kaschmann

He reached the peak of his success as a singer in the 1880s and 1890s, building an international reputation (as Giuseppe Kaschmann) and performing at such important venues as the Bayreuth Festspielhaus in Germany (in 1892 and 1894) and the Metropolitan Opera in New York City (in 1883 and 1896), as well as continuing to appear at La Scala. Audiences in Spain, Portugal, Russia, Monaco, Egypt, Brazil and Argentina also had an opportunity to hear him perform during his prime but he never sang in England.

In 1907, he was granted permission to go back to Zagreb by the Austrian government, which in those days controlled Croatia. For many years he had been prevented from returning to Croatia because, as a young man, he had allegedly deserted from the Austrian army following the annexation of Bosnia and Herzegovina. This ban was lifted only after papal intervention on his behalf.

He was particularly renowned for his performances in operas by Giuseppe Verdi and Richard Wagner. Towards the end of his stage career however, as the quality of his voice began to deteriorate due to age, he switched to the buffo repertoire of Rossini, Donizetti and other composers of comic operas. In 1903, he made a number of recordings in Milan for the British Gramophone & Typewriter Company.

== Last years and death ==
As late as the 1920s, he was still singing roles in comic operas such as Don Pasquale and Il barbiere di Siviglia. His last public performance was in 1921, in Domenico Cimarosa's opera Le astuzie femminili, staged in Rome. Kašman also taught singing. His finest student was Salvatore Baccaloni, a celebrated Italian buffo bass. Rome became his final home and he died there in 1925, aged 74.

== Sources ==
- "Dizionario di musica", di A.Della Corte e G.M.Gatti, Paravia, 1956, pag.320
- "Giuseppe Kaschmann Signore delle scene", di Giusy Criscione, ed. Comunità di Lussinpiccolo 2012
- Kašman, Josip at lzmk.hr (in Croatian)
- "Ricordi istriani", di Giani Stuparich
