= Punta Križa =

Village in Primorje-Gorski Kotar, Croatia

Punta Križa Punta Croce
- Village
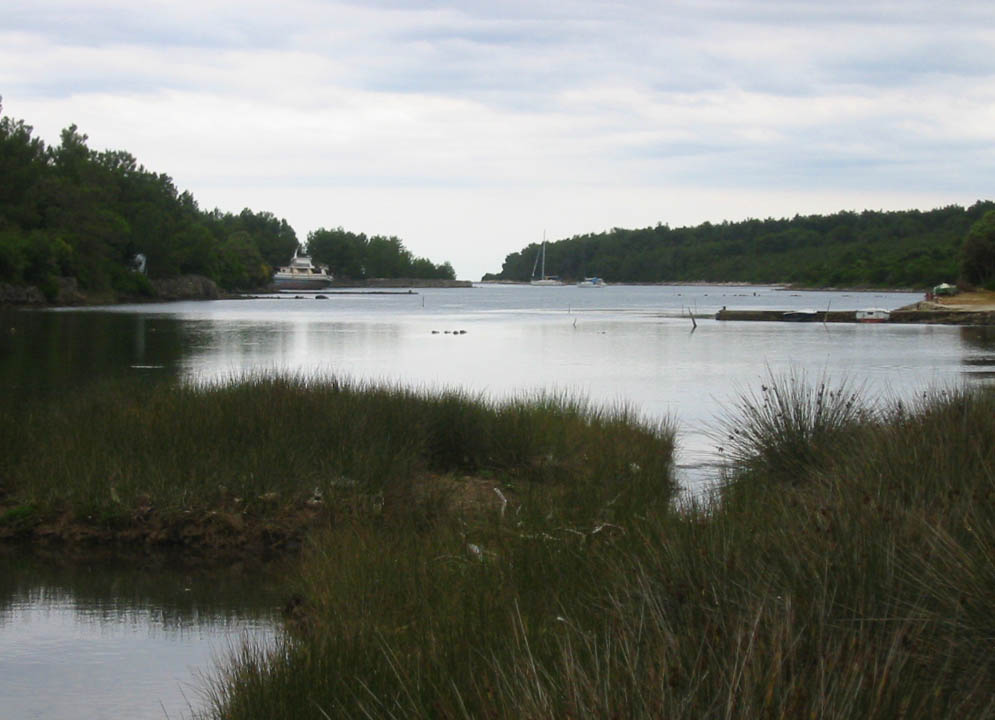
- Punta Križa bay

- Location within Croatia
- Coordinates: 44.63784°N 14.49444°E
- Country: Croatia
- County: Primorje-Gorski Kotar
- Town: Mali Lošinj

Area
  - Total: 40.3 km^{2} (15.6 sq mi)

Population (2021)
  - Total: 46
  - Density: 1.1/km^{2} (3.0/sq mi)
- Time zone: UTC+1 (CET)
  - Summer (DST): UTC+2 (CEST)
- Postal code: 51554
- Area code: 051
- Vehicle registration: RI

Punta Križa (Italian: Punta Croce) is a village on the southern end of the Croatian island of Cres, in Primorje-Gorski Kotar. Administratively, it is part of the town of Mali Lošinj. As of 2021, it had a population of 46. There are at least two marinas in the region.

== History ==
A waterspout made landfall in the area of Punta Križa's hamlet Pogana the morning of 28 July 2019, knocking down about 50 pine and holm oaks trees, blocking traffic between Pogana and Punta Križa. At the auto camp, one pine fell on the cage of a dog, killing it. The JVP Grada Mali Lošinj and DVD Lošinj responded, arriving at 7:47, joined by the HEP who restored damaged cables. Traffic was restored at 13:30.

== Etymology ==
Punta Križa as a term has implications for ancient maritime traditions since wooden crosses which are called križ in Croatian were indicators of the safe harbours before lighthouses and other signal tools were employed to support navigation.
