= Mali Lošinj =

Mali Lošinj Lussinpiccolo
- Town
- Grad Mali Lošinj; Town of Mali Lošinj
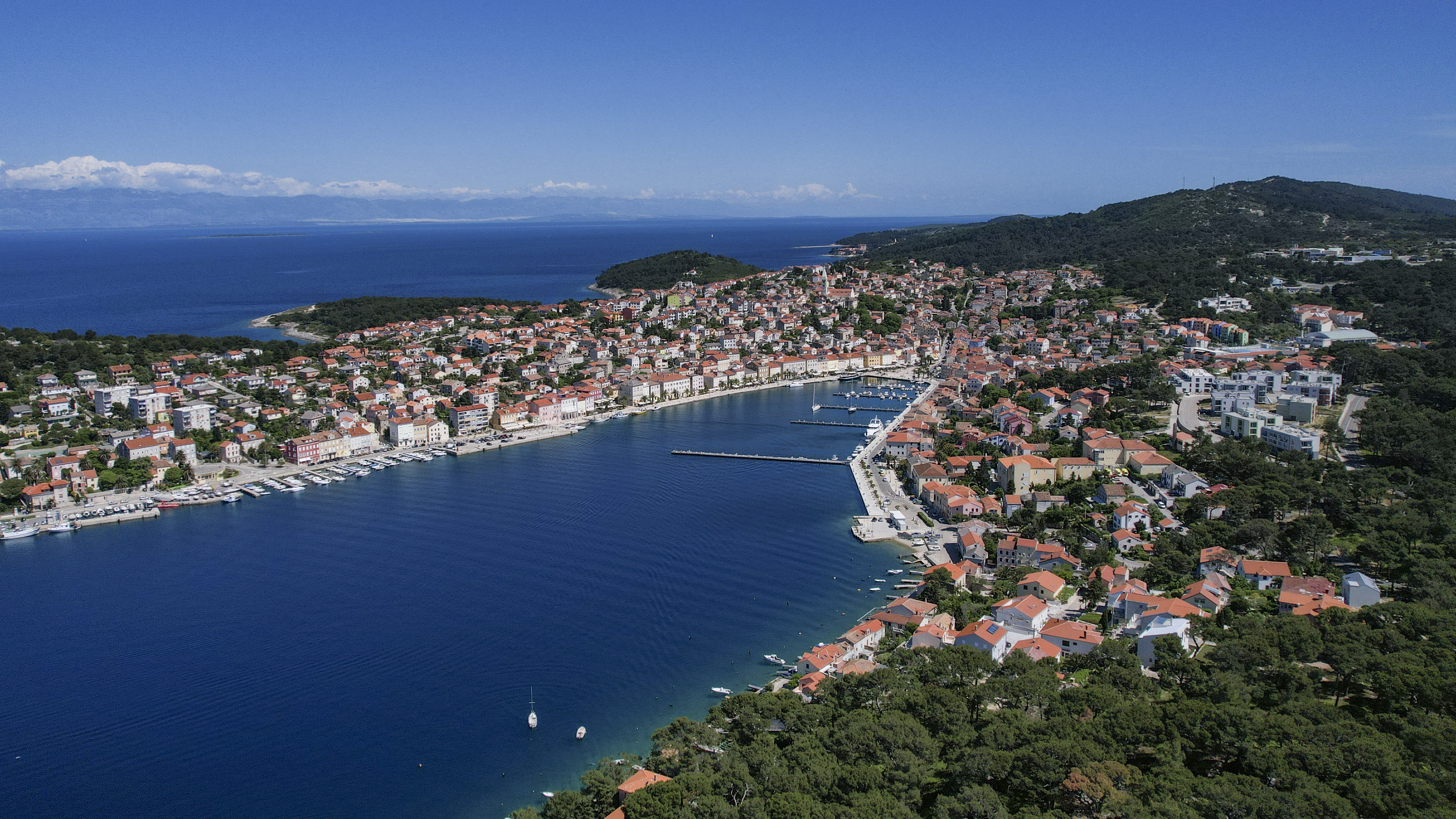
- Mali Lošinj

- Flag Coat of arms

- Location of Mali Lošinj within Croatia
- Coordinates: 44°32′N 14°28′E
- Country: Croatia
- County: Primorje-Gorski Kotar
- Island: Lošinj

Government
  - Mayor: Ana Kučić (HDZ)

Area
  - Town: 224.6 km^{2} (86.7 sq mi)
  - Urban: 12.5 km^{2} (4.8 sq mi)
- Elevation: 0 m (0 ft)

Population (2021)
  - Town: 7,537
  - Density: 33.56/km^{2} (86.91/sq mi)
  - Urban: 5,561
  - Urban density: 445/km^{2} (1,150/sq mi)
- Time zone: UTC+1 (CET)
  - Summer (DST): UTC+2 (CEST)
- Postal code: 51 550
- Area code: 051
- Website: mali-losinj.hr

Mali Lošinj (Italian: Lussinpiccolo, Venetian: Lusinpicolo) is a town in the Primorje-Gorski Kotar County, on the island of Lošinj, in western Croatia. At the time of the 2021 census, there were 7,537 inhabitants, of whom 86% were Croats. The town of Mali Lošinj itself had an urban population of 5,561.

The favourable climatic conditions, the construction of hotels and resorts, foresting, and maintenance of beaches have led to the intensive development of tourism. The town is located in the most protected part of the Lošinj bay, on the eastern, sunny side of the island.

The asteroid 10415 Mali Lošinj is named after this town.

== History ==
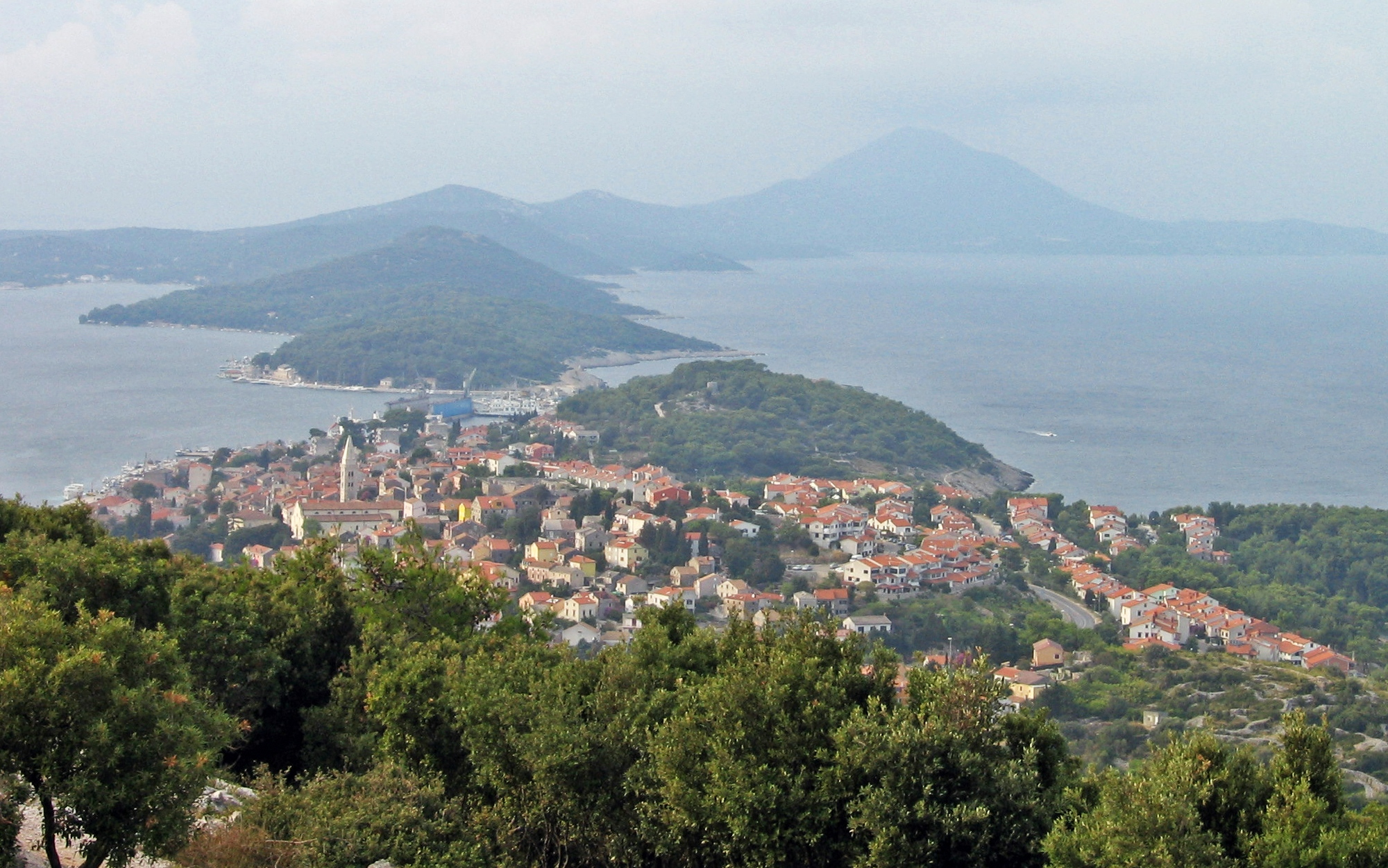
View of the town

The town was first mentioned in 1398, under the name Malo selo ("small village"). In 1868, it experienced its golden year. There were as many as eleven shipyards, and it became the place with the largest and most developed merchant marine in the Adriatic Sea, even ahead of cities like Rijeka, Trieste and Venice. American author Kenneth Roberts observed that the little town, like some in southern Maine, seemed to have "produced a hundred seamen for each one produced elsewhere." Writing in 1938, Roberts said there were currently "four hundred sea captains living on Lussinpiccolo, which is about the size of Monhegan Island- captains of all sorts of vessels, from thirty thousand ton liners to hundred ton merchant brigs."

With the invention of the steam engine a stagnation in development ensued, and with the outbreak of the grapevine disease peronospora. Previously part of the Venetian Republic, Mali Lošinj passed under Austrian-Hungarian rule in 1797 with the Treaty of Campo Formio. The isle remained under Austrian-Hungarian rule until 1918. After World War I, under the provisions of the Treaty of Rapallo it was given to the Kingdom of Italy. In 1947, it was incorporated into Yugoslavia. Its incorporation into socialist Yugoslavia led to mass emigration of its Italian population. After World War II there were only 2,200 residents left. In 1991, it became part of present-day Croatia.

In the summer of 2019, the fire department JVP Grada Mali Lošinj saved a young caver who was stuck 10 10 metres (33 ft) below ground in a cave near Srem, a hamlet of Belej.

== Population ==
Town of Mali Lošinj: Population trends 1857–2021
v

population	11862	11929	12271	12303	12267	13634	12058	11659	9079	8287	8168	6844	7466	8825	8388	8116	7537
	1857	1869	1880	1890	1900	1910	1921	1931	1948	1953	1961	1971	1981	1991	2001	2011	2021

Sources: Croatian Bureau of Statistics publications

=== Settlements ===
Administratively, the town of Mali Lošinj comprises 14 settlements, of which several are islands. Each of them is listed below, with their respective population as of 2021.

- Belej - 40 ▼
- Ćunski - 198 ▲
- Ilovik - 106 ▲
- Male Srakane - 2
- Mali Lošinj - 5,561 ▼
- Nerezine - 397 ▲
- Osor - 26 ▼
- Punta Križa - 46 ▼
- Susak - 139 ▼
- Sveti Jakov - 74 ▼
- Unije - 66 ▼
- Ustrine - 21 ▼
- Vele Srakane - 4 ▲
- Veli Lošinj - 857 ▼

== Climate ==
Since records began in 1961, the highest temperature recorded at the local weather station at an elevation of 53 metres (174 ft) was 39.0 °C (102.2 °F), on 6 August 2017. From 1981 to 2011, the highest temperature recorded at the Čikat weather station was 36.6 °C (97.9 °F), on 2 August 1998. The coldest temperature was −8.6 °C (16.5 °F), on 4 March 1987. The coldest temperature was −6.7 °C (19.9 °F), on 23 January 1963.

Climate data for Mali Lošinj (1971–2000, extremes 1961–2014)
Month	Jan	Feb	Mar	Apr	May	Jun	Jul	Aug	Sep	Oct	Nov	Dec	Year
Record high °C (°F)	17.4 (63.3)	20.4 (68.7)	23.3 (73.9)	26.1 (79.0)	34.5 (94.1)	35.6 (96.1)	36.3 (97.3)	37.4 (99.3)	32.4 (90.3)	29.2 (84.6)	23.1 (73.6)	18.9 (66.0)	37.4 (99.3)
Mean daily maximum °C (°F)	10.2 (50.4)	10.7 (51.3)	13.2 (55.8)	16.3 (61.3)	21.3 (70.3)	25.2 (77.4)	28.4 (83.1)	28.4 (83.1)	24.2 (75.6)	19.6 (67.3)	14.6 (58.3)	11.4 (52.5)	18.6 (65.5)
Daily mean °C (°F)	7.9 (46.2)	7.9 (46.2)	9.9 (49.8)	12.8 (55.0)	17.4 (63.3)	21.2 (70.2)	24.1 (75.4)	24.0 (75.2)	20.3 (68.5)	16.4 (61.5)	12.0 (53.6)	9.2 (48.6)	15.3 (59.5)
Mean daily minimum °C (°F)	5.9 (42.6)	5.8 (42.4)	7.5 (45.5)	10.0 (50.0)	14.2 (57.6)	17.8 (64.0)	20.6 (69.1)	20.7 (69.3)	17.5 (63.5)	14.1 (57.4)	10.0 (50.0)	7.3 (45.1)	12.6 (54.7)
Record low °C (°F)	−6.7 (19.9)	−4.4 (24.1)	−3.8 (25.2)	2.9 (37.2)	6.3 (43.3)	9.7 (49.5)	12.7 (54.9)	10.0 (50.0)	9.7 (49.5)	5.0 (41.0)	1.1 (34.0)	−5.2 (22.6)	−6.7 (19.9)
Average precipitation mm (inches)	75.0 (2.95)	69.4 (2.73)	66.1 (2.60)	69.2 (2.72)	59.5 (2.34)	67.9 (2.67)	30.9 (1.22)	57.0 (2.24)	105.7 (4.16)	109.1 (4.30)	125.1 (4.93)	95.8 (3.77)	930.5 (36.63)
Average precipitation days (≥ 0.1 mm)	10.1	8.4	9.3	10.3	10.0	8.3	5.4	6.0	8.6	10.0	11.3	10.4	108.3
Average snowy days (≥ 1.0 cm)	0.3	0.2	0.0	0.0	0.0	0.0	0.0	0.0	0.0	0.0	0.0	0.0	0.5
Average relative humidity (%)	74.1	70.6	70.9	70.8	70.7	67.9	63.5	65.6	71.2	72.7	72.8	73.5	70.4
Mean monthly sunshine hours	108.5	158.1	182.9	216.0	282.1	315.0	356.5	325.5	246.0	182.9	114.0	99.2	2,586.7
Percentage possible sunshine	40	53	53	56	64	71	79	77	67	56	43	39	61
Source: Croatian Meteorological and Hydrological Service

== Mayors ==
No.	Name	Term of office		Political Affiliation
1	Mario Hofmann	1991	1993	HNS-LD
2	Dragan Balija	1993	2005	PGS
3	Gari Cappelli	2005	2016	HDZ
4	Ana Kučić	2017	Incumbent	HDZ

== Gallery ==
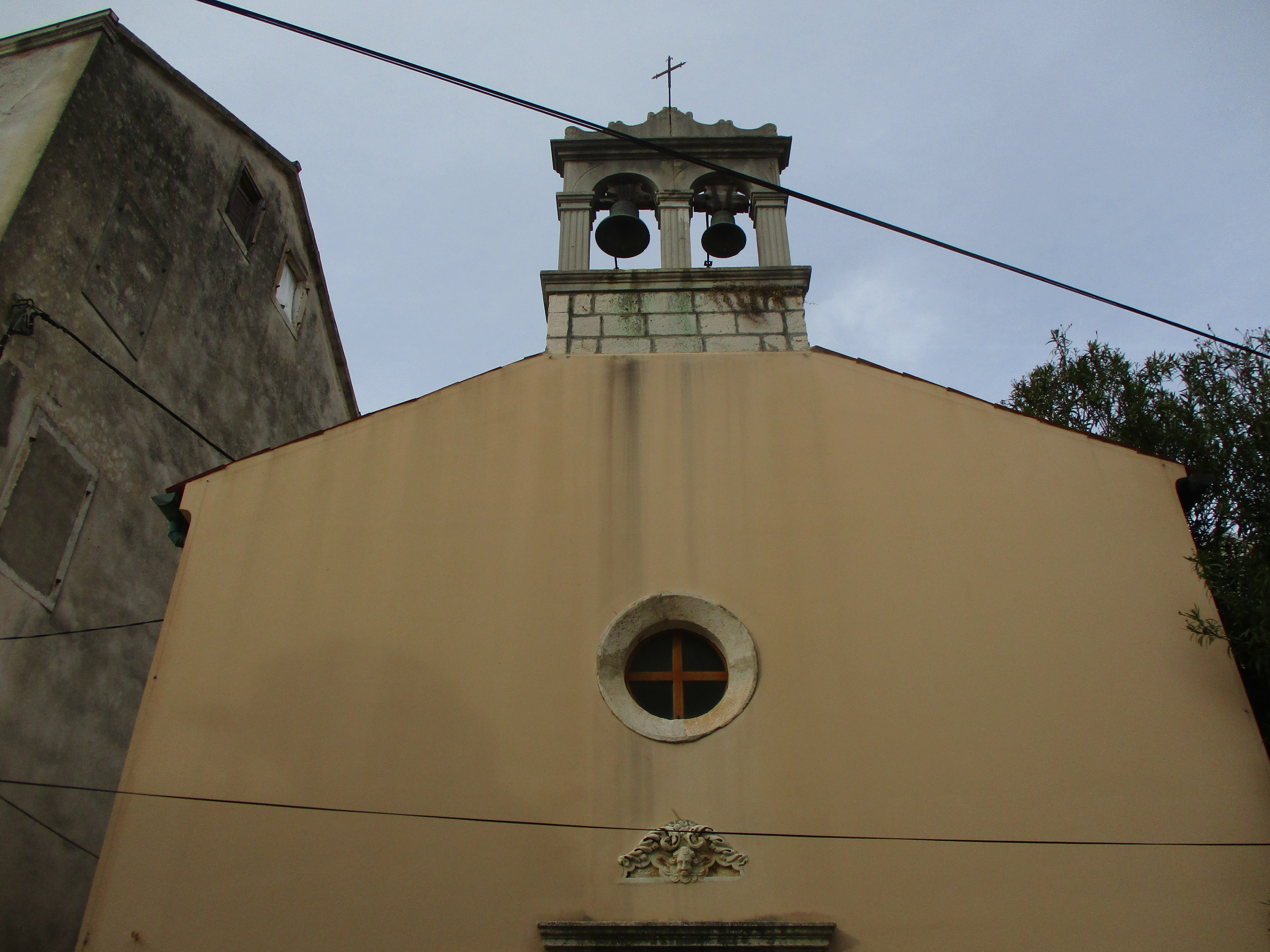

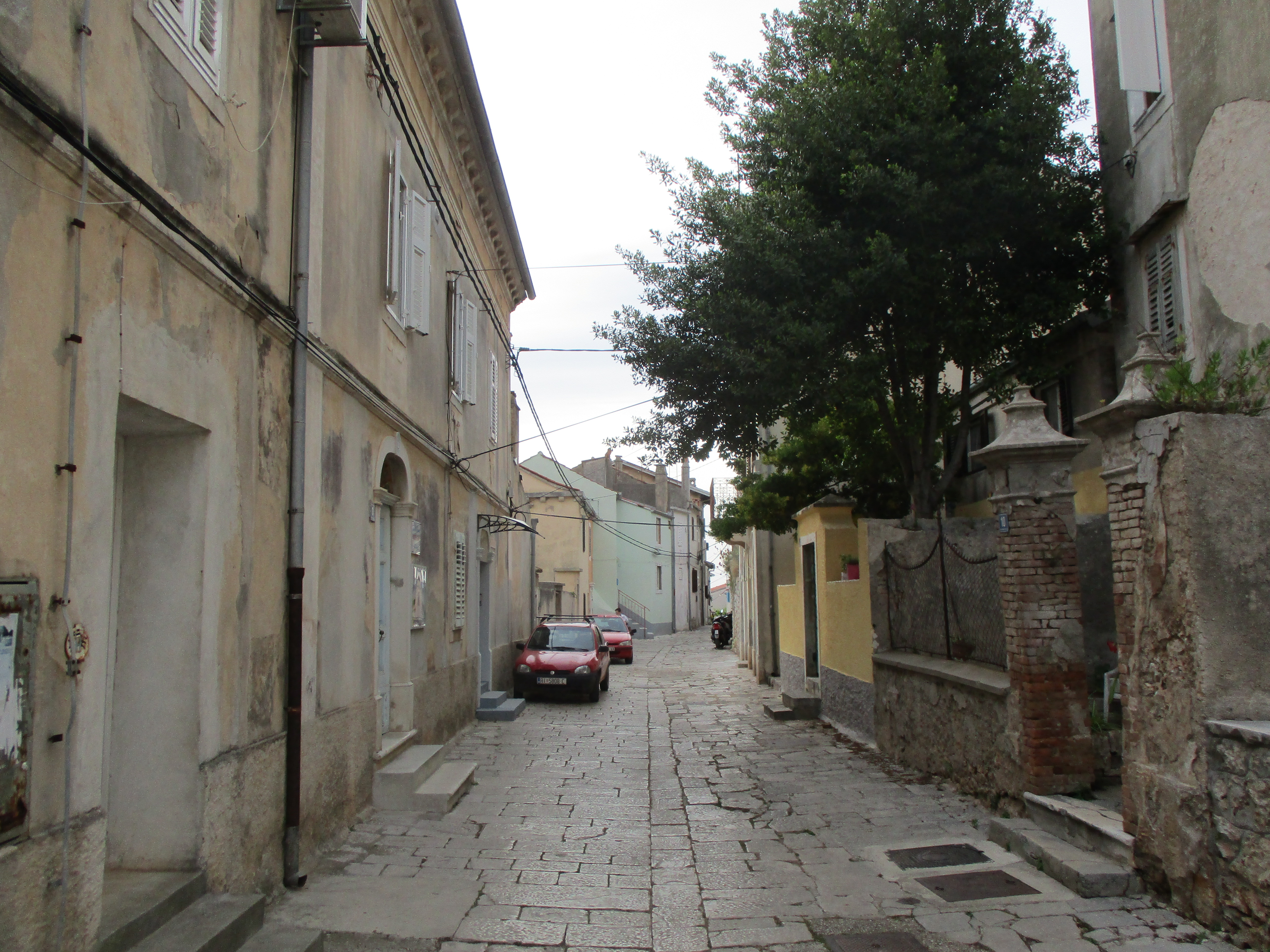

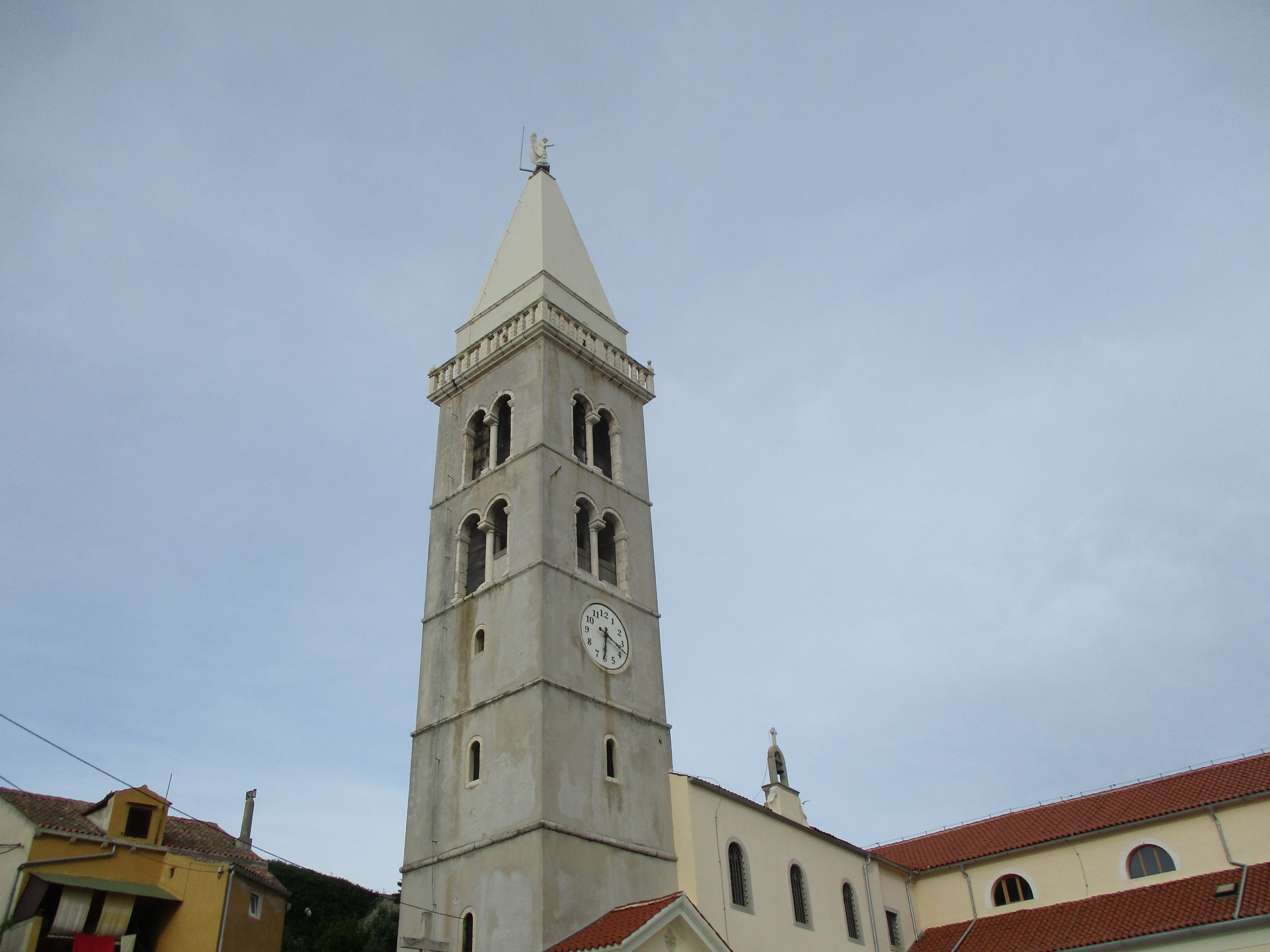

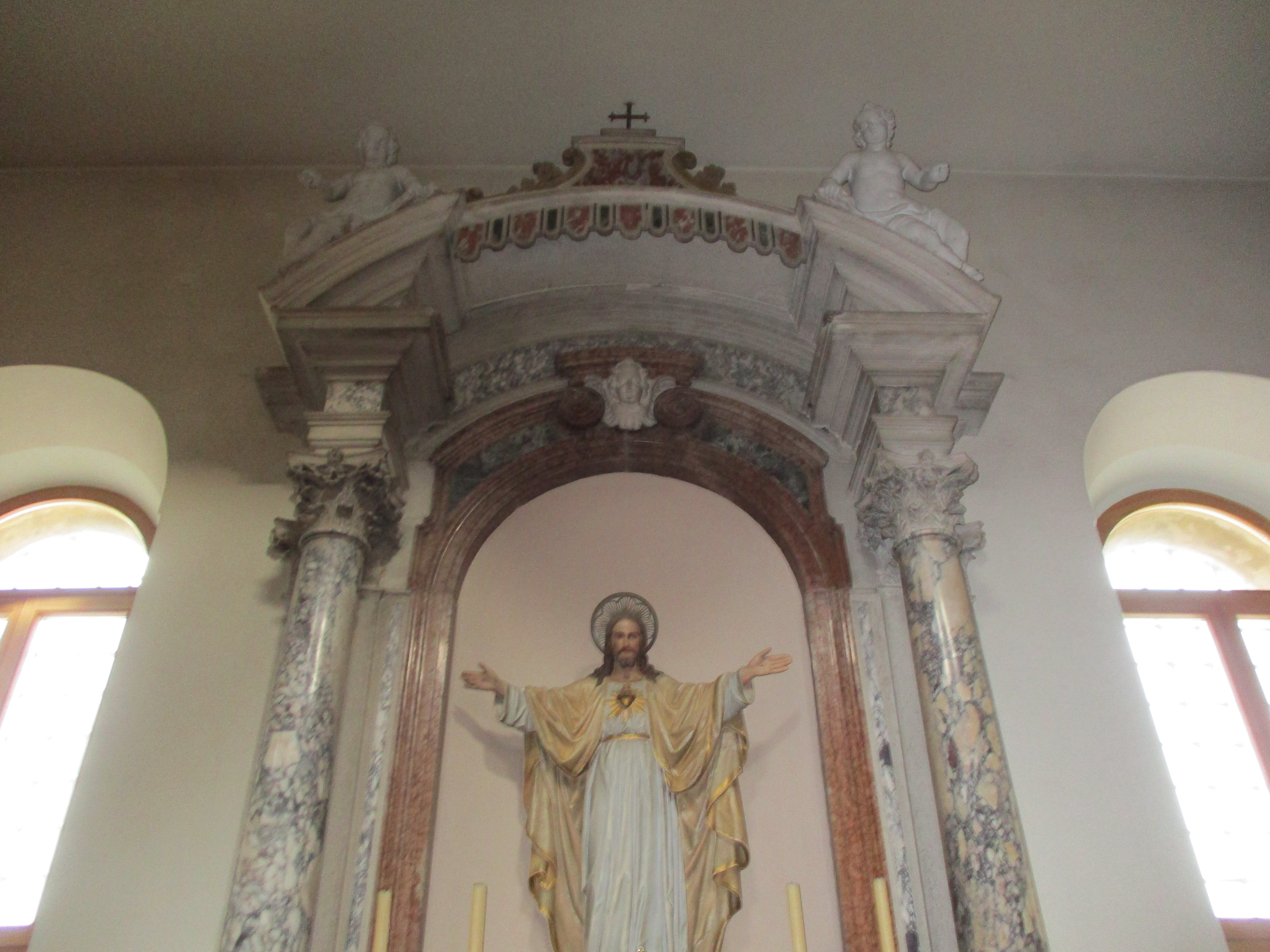

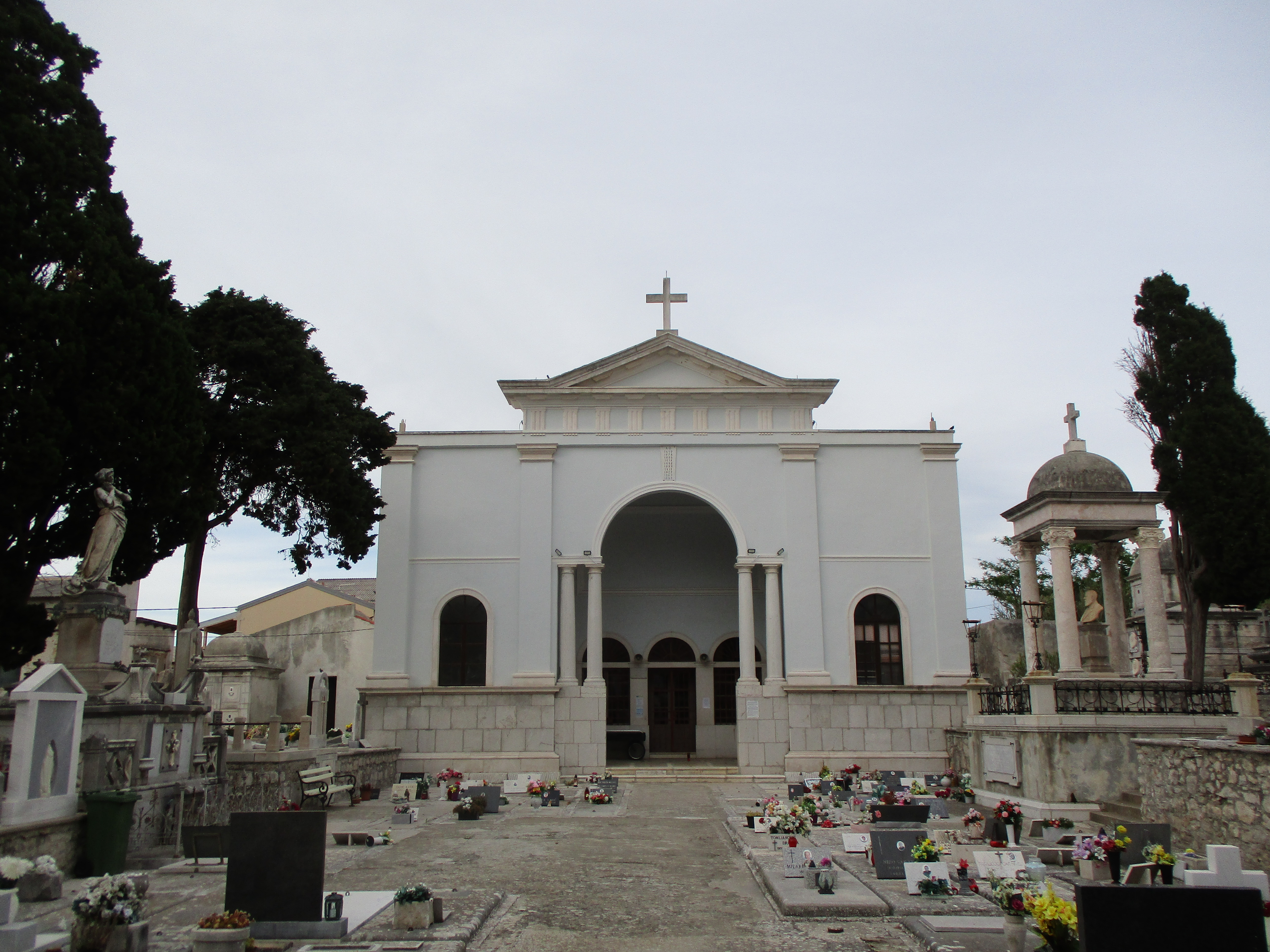

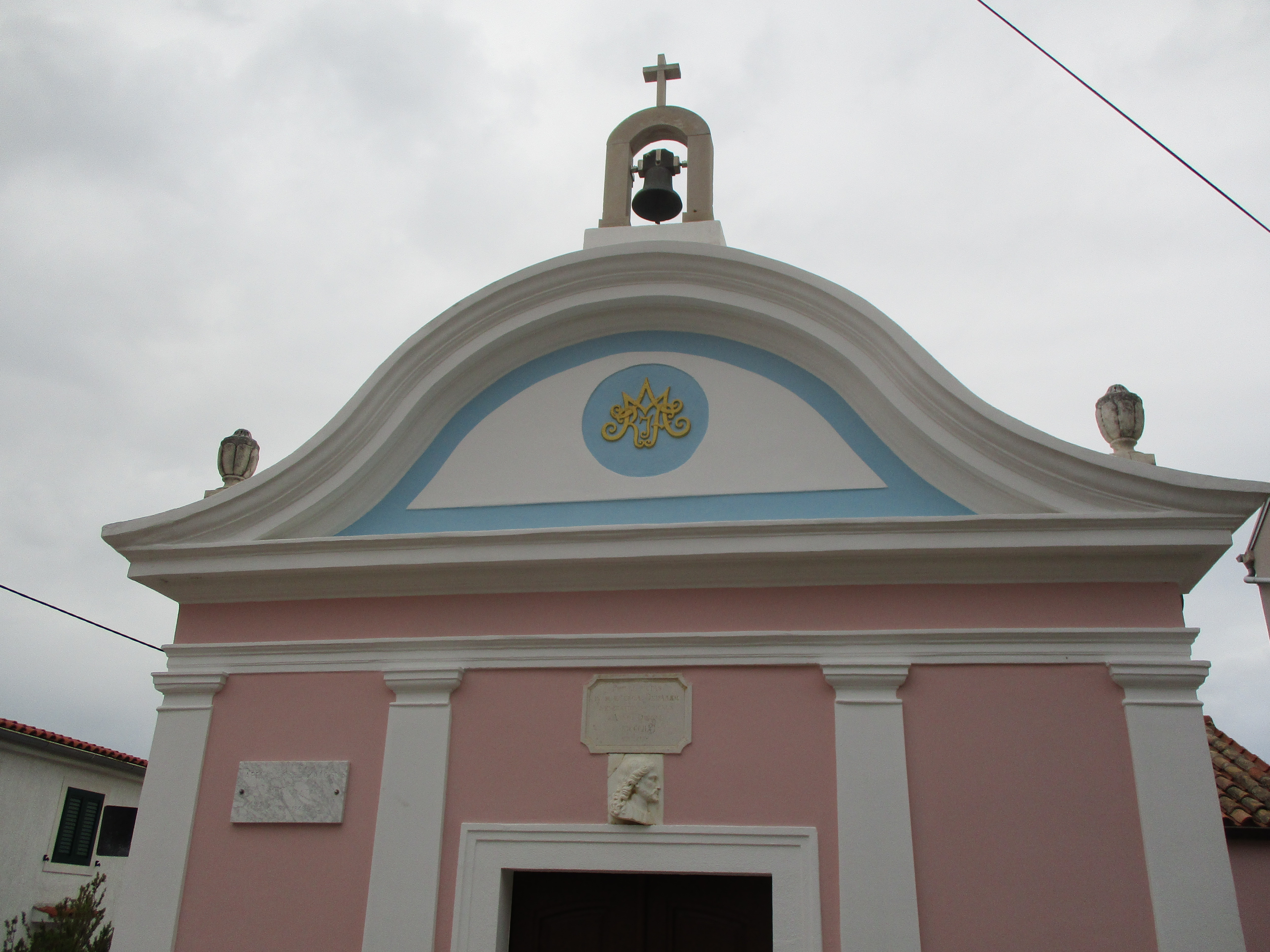

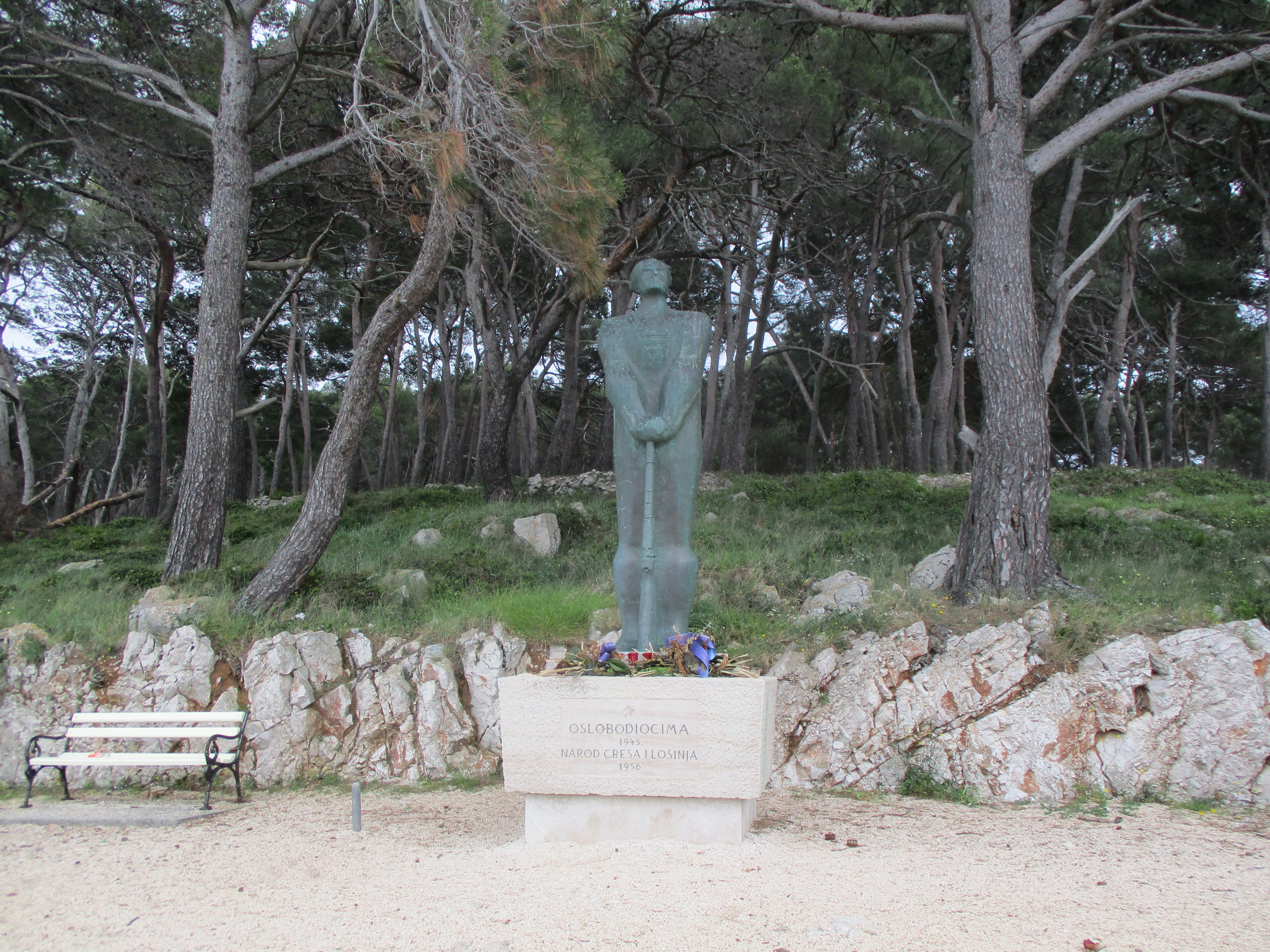

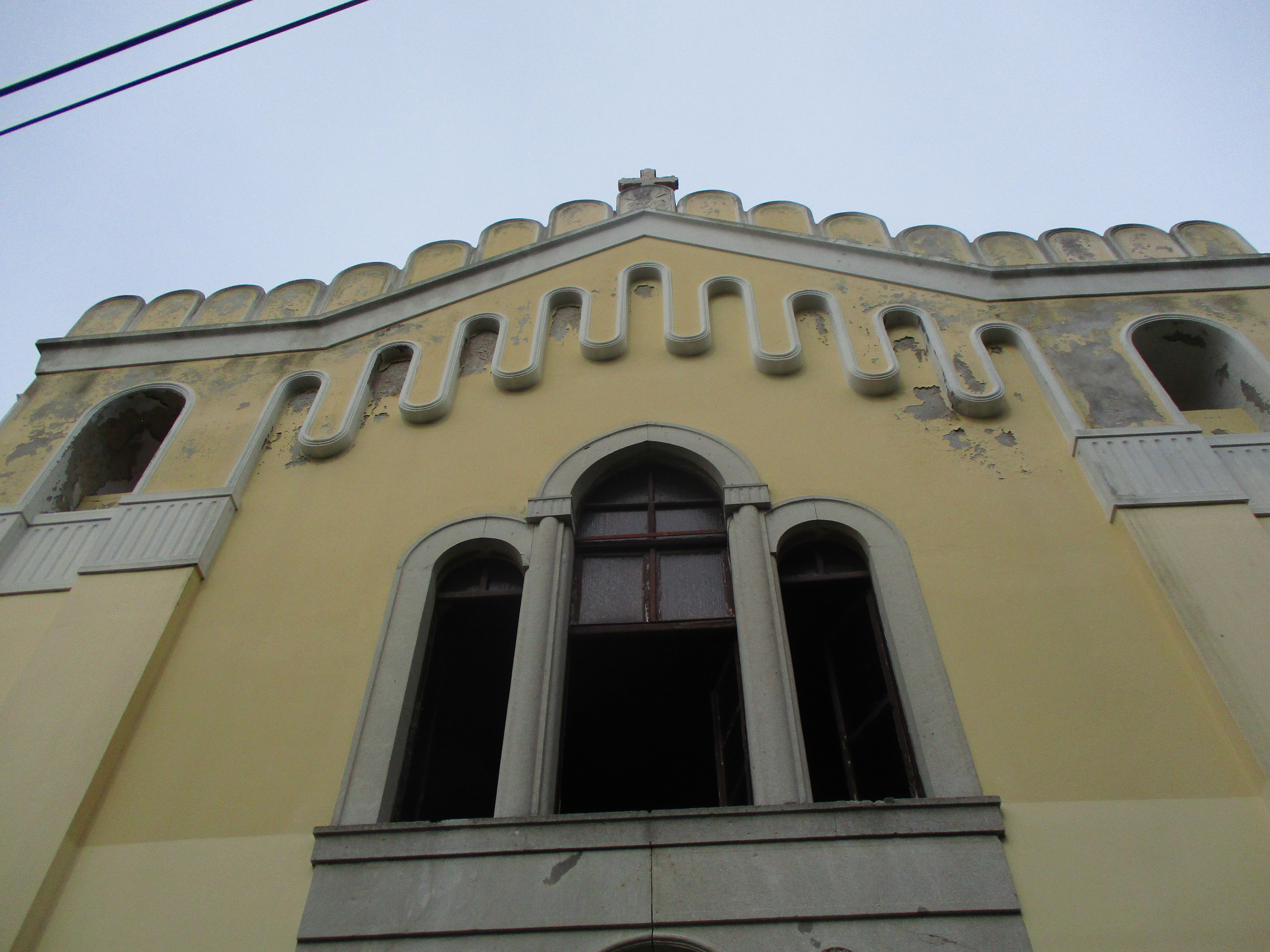

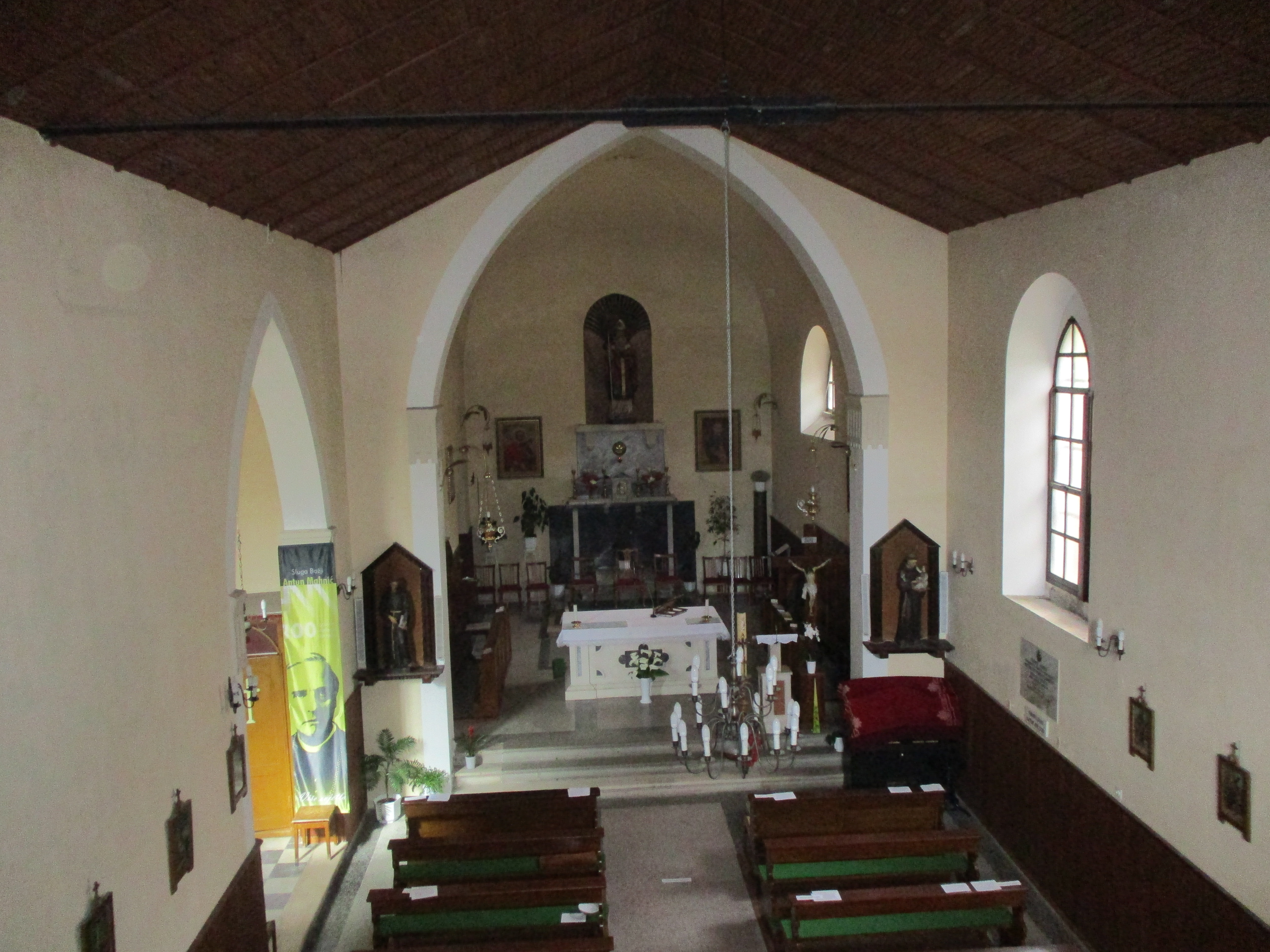

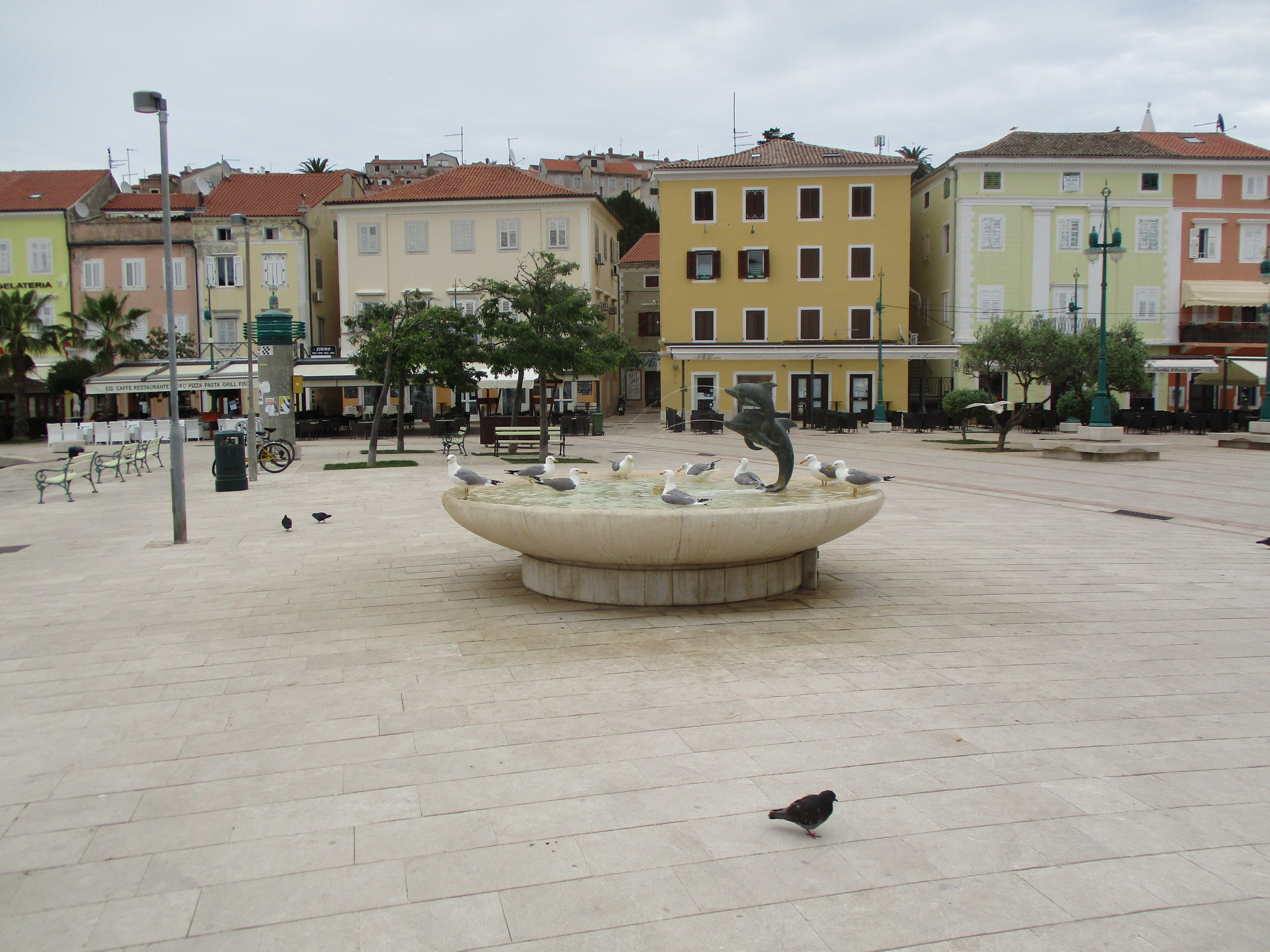

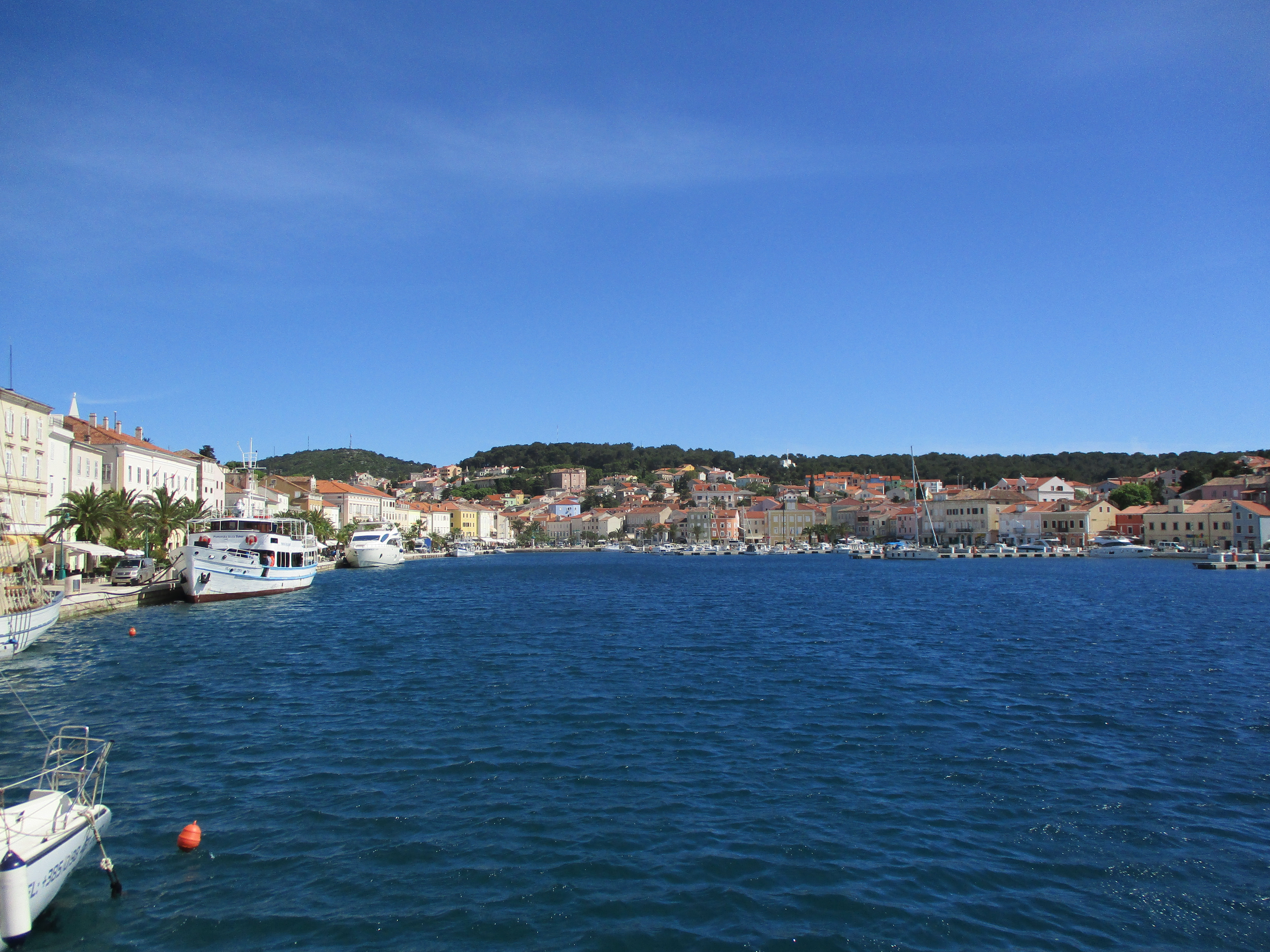

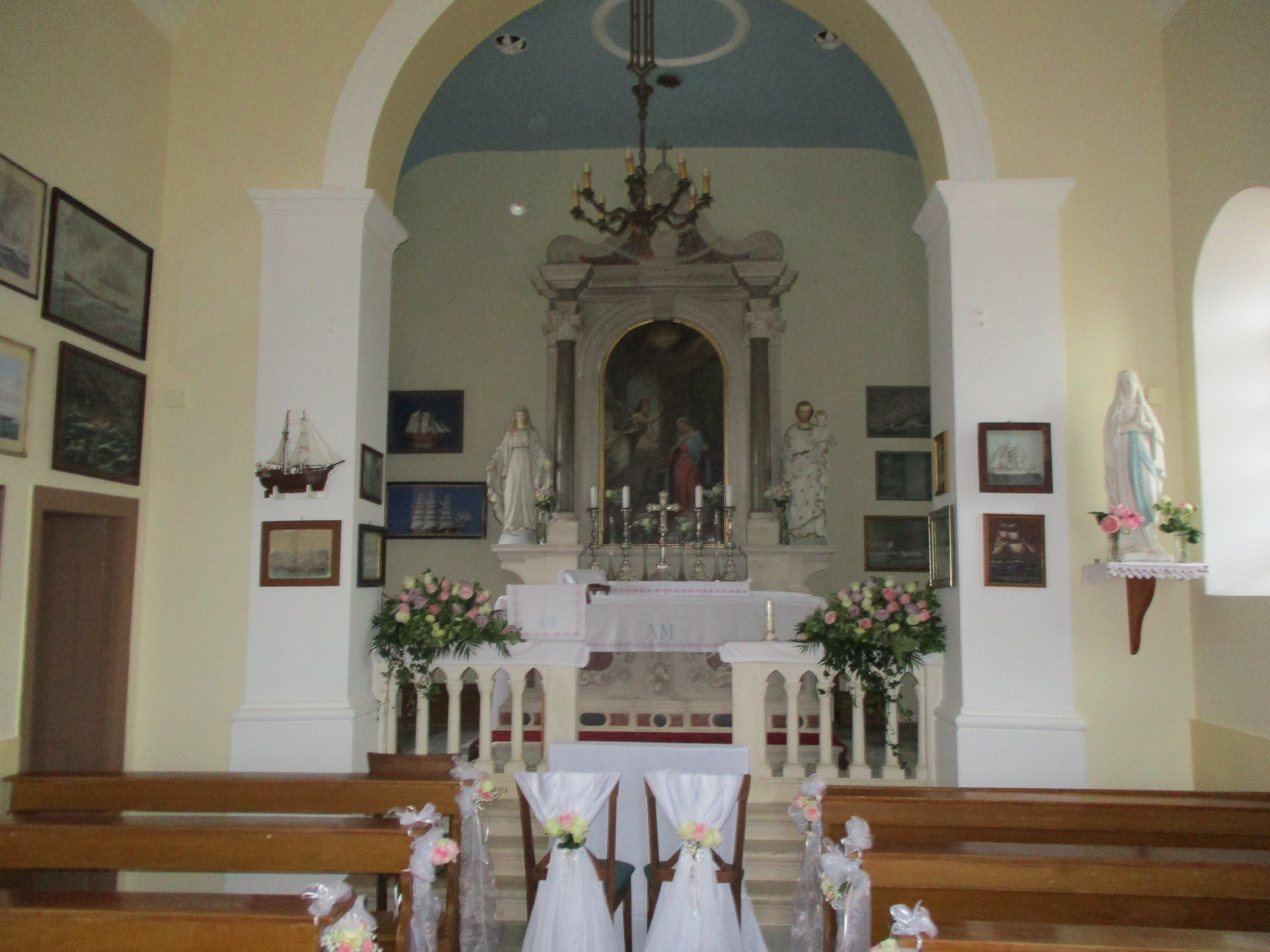

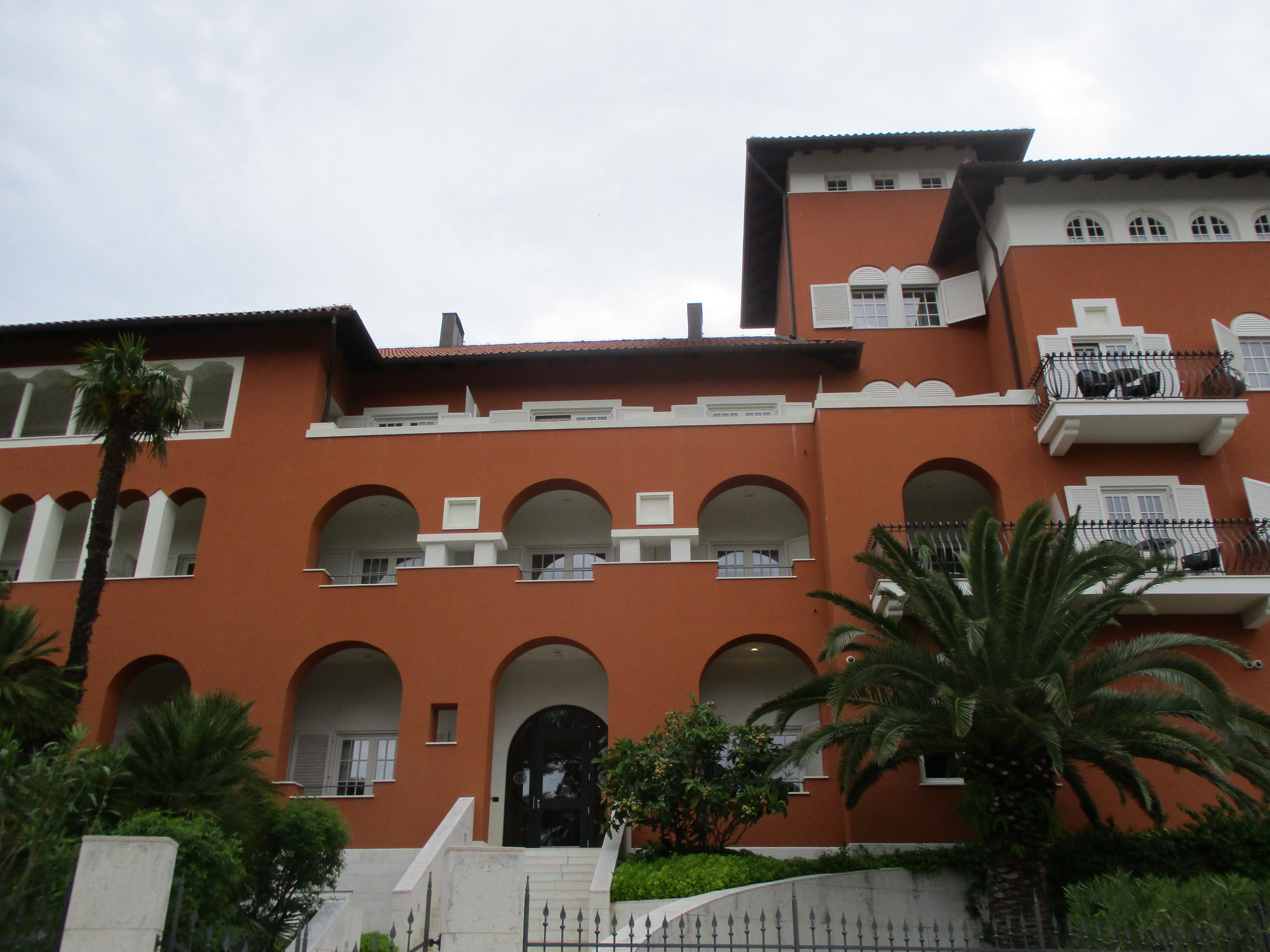

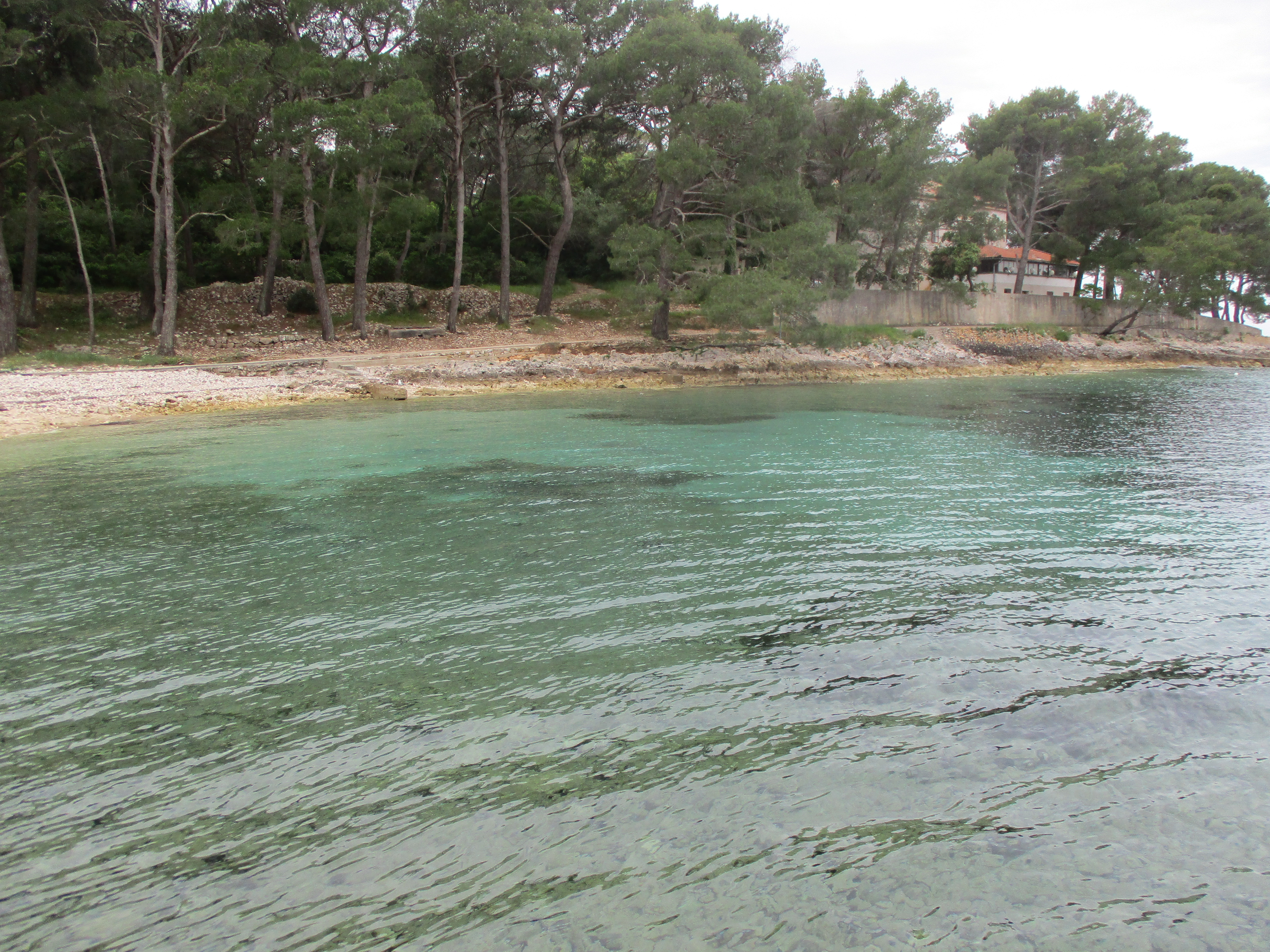

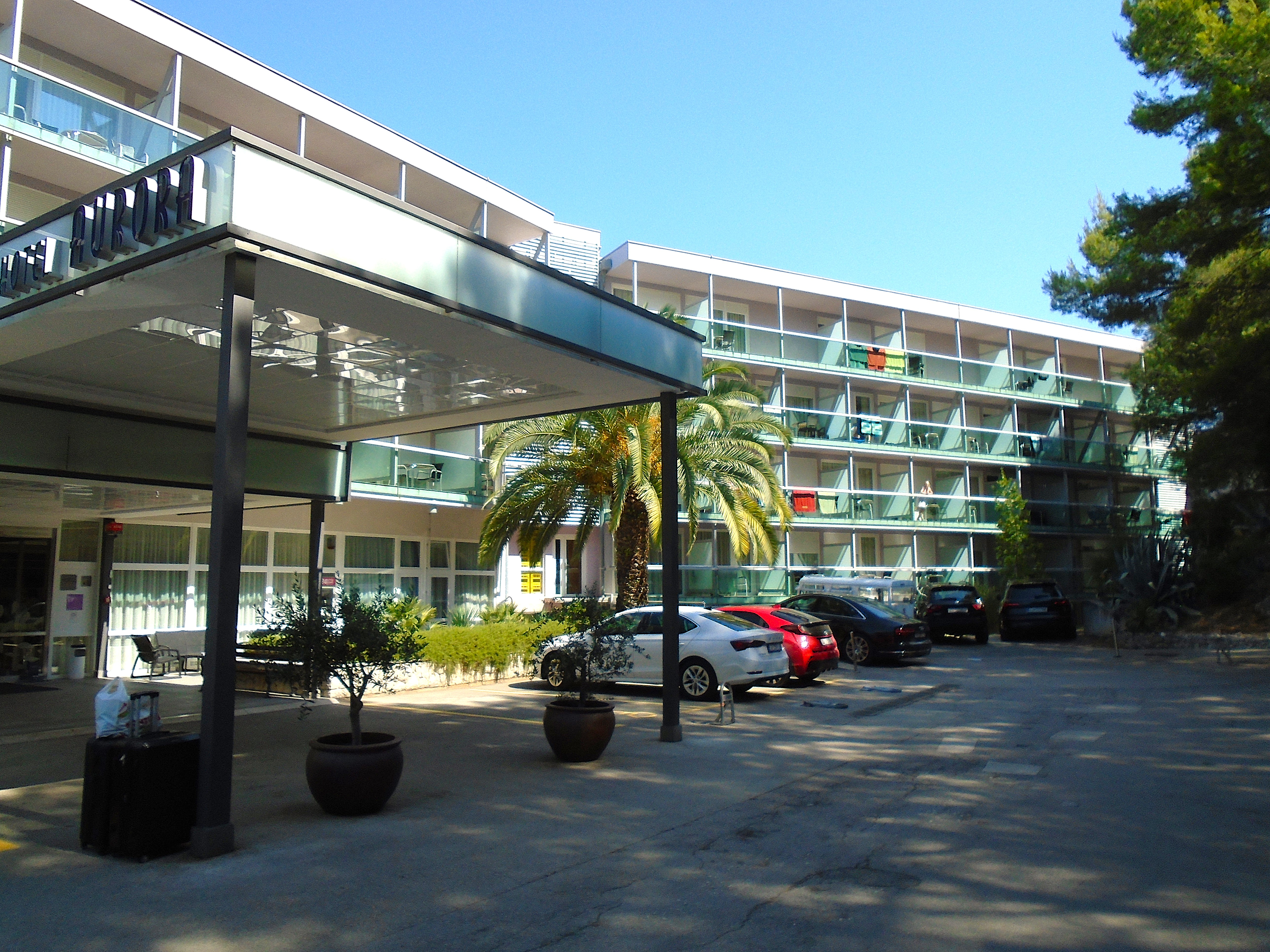
"Aurora" Hotel

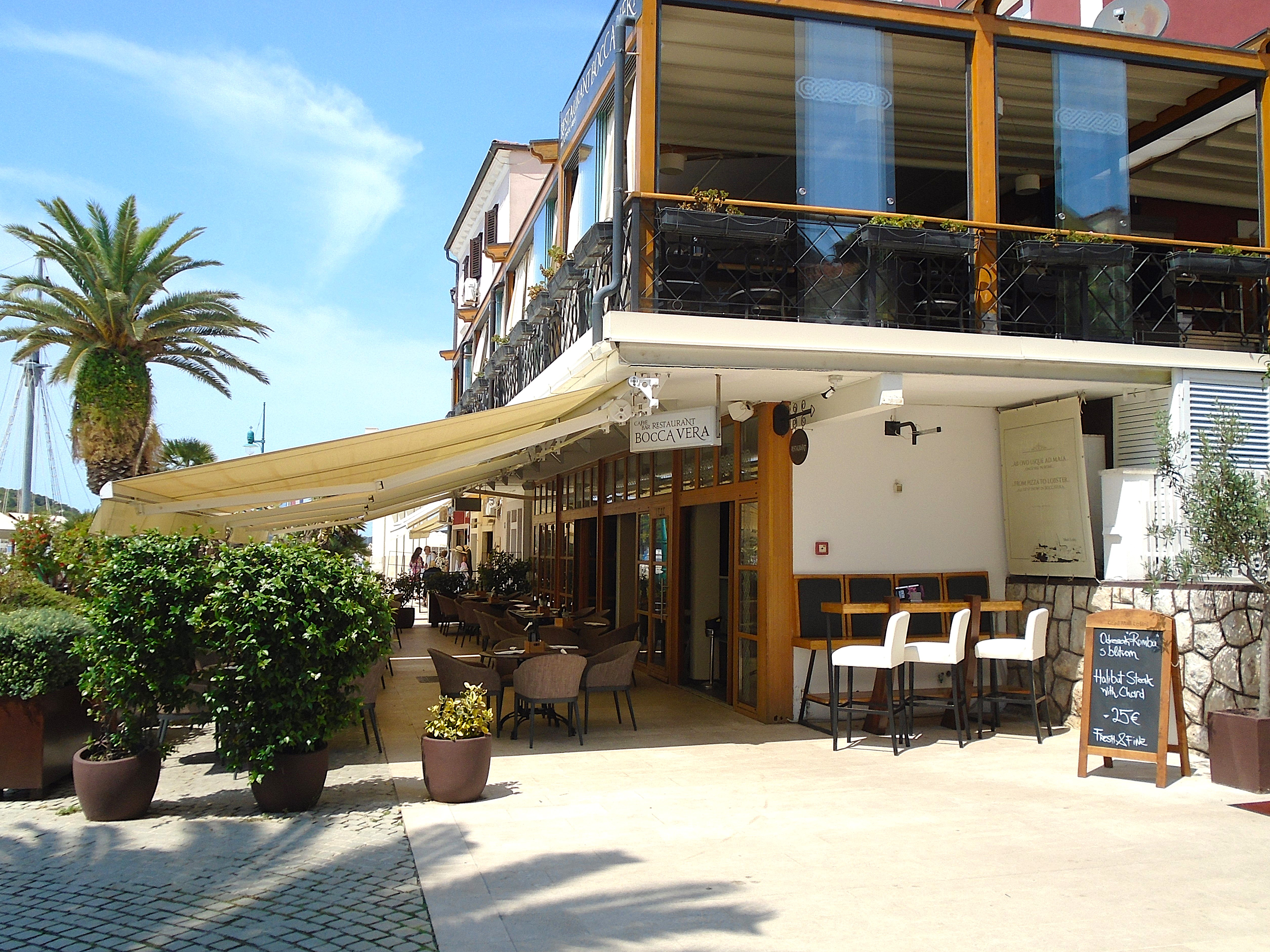
Open-air restaurant

== Notable people ==
- Matteo Martinolich
- Gari Cappelli
- Josip Kašman

== Bibliography ==
=== General ===
- "Lošinjska plovidba". Tehnička enciklopedija (in Croatian). Miroslav Krleža Institute of Lexicography.

=== Biology ===
- Šašić, Martina; Nahirnić, Ana; Tarmann, Gerhard M. (2016-12-31). "Zygaenidae (Lepidoptera) in the Lepidoptera collections of the Croatian Natural History Museum". Natura Croatica: Periodicum Musei Historiae Naturalis Croatici. 25 (2): 233–248. doi:10.20302/NC.2016.25.19. eISSN 1848-7386.

=== Infrastructure ===
- Šrajer, Filip; Knezić, Tihomir; Igrc, Petra (2019). Analiza mogućnosti smještaja lokacija za gospodarenje otpadom (privremena odlagališta građevnog otpada) na malim otocima na području Grada Maloga Lošinja [Analysis of Possible Locations for Waste Management (Temporary Dumps of Construction Waste) on Small Islands on the Territory of the City of Mali Lošinj] (in Serbo-Croatian).
