= The Walrus =

Canadian magazine, founded 2003

- The Walrus cover, Jan/Feb 2022 edition, featuring illustration by Tallulah Fontaine
- Editor: Carmine Starnino
- Categories: Canadian and international affairs
- Frequency: 8 issues per year
- Circulation: 30,800 (2020)
- First issue: September 2003
- Company: The Walrus Foundation
- Country: Canada
- Based in: Toronto
- Language: English
- Website: thewalrus.ca
- ISSN: 1708-4032
- OCLC: 680091331

The Walrus is an independent, nonprofit Canadian media organization. It is multi-platform and produces an eight-issue-per-year magazine and online editorial content that includes current affairs, fiction, poetry, and podcasts, a national speaker series called The Walrus Talks, and branded content for clients through The Walrus Lab.

== History ==
=== Creation ===
In 2002, David Berlin, a former editor and owner of the Literary Review of Canada, began promoting his vision of a world-class Canadian magazine. This led him to meet with then-Harper's editor Lewis H. Lapham to discuss creating a "Harper's North", which would combine the American magazine with 40 pages of Canadian content. As Berlin searched for funding to create that content, a mutual friend put him in touch with Ken Alexander, a former high school English and history teacher and then senior producer of CBC Newsworld's CounterSpin. Like Berlin, Alexander was hoping to found an intelligent Canadian magazine that dealt with world affairs.

Before long, the Chawkers Foundation, run by Alexander's family, agreed to give the prospective magazine $5 million over five years, and the George Cedric Metcalf Charitable Foundation promised $150,000 for an internship program. This provided enough money to get by without the partnership with Harper's.

Shortly thereafter, Berlin and Alexander hired creative director Antonio de Luca and art director Jason Logan to envision the launch of The Walrus.

The magazine launched in September 2003 as an attempt to create a Canadian equivalent to U.S. magazines such as Harper's, The Atlantic Monthly, or The New Yorker. Since then, it has become Canada's leading general-interest magazine. Its mandate is:

to be a national general interest magazine about Canada and its place in the world. We are committed to publishing the best work by the best writers from Canada and elsewhere on a wide range of topics for readers who are curious about the world.

=== Name ===
The "walrus" name was a working title at first, but it quickly grew on the magazine's staff. According to its website, the rationale for it was "to dissociate this country with the 'log chomping' and 'earnestness' of our national animal (and cliché), the beaver"; the walrus, just as native to Canada, is "curmudgeonly but clever, bulky but agile (if only in water)." Most importantly, in David Berlin's words, "No one ignores a walrus."

=== Magazine ===
Berlin resigned as editor in 2004; Alexander ended his tumultuous reign as publisher, then editor, in 2008. John Macfarlane, former editor-in-chief of Toronto Life and publisher of Saturday Night, joined The Walrus in 2008 as editor and co-publisher. With newly returned art director Brian Morgan, Macfarlane oversaw a revamping of the editorial and art direction of the magazine. The new Walrus was to be more consistent and current, with a "far more internally driven" process for story selection, and the reworked cover featuring illustrations that corresponded to each issue's content.

The Walrus soon began to receive critical acclaim: its two 2003 issues alone garnered 11 National Magazine Award nominations and three wins, and the Utne Reader awarded it the prize for best new publication in 2004. In 2006, it won the National Magazine Award for Magazine of the Year in Canada. As of 2017, it has consistently led in the National Magazine Awards, with 70 wins and 231 nominations.

In 2012, High Fidelity HDTV and The Walrus announced plans to air 14 "original high-definition documentaries" derived from content from The Walrus that had been produced since April 2011. The two companies planned to create more documentaries in the future.

On 13 September 2012, the Walrus unveiled its redesigned website. It was based on the Wordpress platform and developed over five months.

=== Unpaid internship programme ===
In 2014, The Walrus was required to shut down its unpaid internship programme after the Ontario Ministry of Labour declared that its longstanding practice of not paying interns contravened the Employment Standards Act. The magazine issued a statement justifying its practice of using unpaid labour, saying:

We have been training future leaders in media and development for ten years, and we are extremely sorry we are no longer able to provide these opportunities, which have assisted many young Ontarians—and Canadians—in bridging the gap from university to paid work and in, many cases, on to stellar careers.

In 2014, The Walrus began offering paid six-month editorial fellowships. In 2020, the fellowships grew to one year.

=== December 2014–present ===
On 1 December 2014, Jonathan Kay replaced Macfarlane as editor-in-chief.

In October 2015, a report in Canadaland detailed a toxic and disorganised environment at the magazine.

Kay resigned on 14 May 2017 following a controversy about cultural appropriation in which he dismissed Indigenous concerns about the practice. Jessica Johnson was named executive editor, in addition to her existing role as creative director, on 7 September 2017.

Johnson resigned on 2 February 2023, saying, "five years is a long time in the life of a magazine editor, and I've had a really good run." Carmine Starnino, editor-at-large at The Walrus and a founding editor of Maisonneuve magazine, stepped up as interim editor-in-chief no later than 21 February.

In 2026 the magazine signed a first-look deal with Muse Entertainment, allowing the magazine's content to be considered for possible development into documentary film or television projects.

== Finances ==
Though The Walrus was initially pledged $1 million annually by the Chawkers Foundation for its first five years, it was unable to access this money without first being recognized as a charitable organisation by the Canada Revenue Agency. The Alexander family was forced to support the magazine out of its own pocket until it finally received charitable status in 2005, creating the charitable nonprofit Walrus Foundation. In addition to publishing the magazine, the Foundation runs events across Canada, including talks and debates on public policy.

In the relatively small yet geographically large Canadian market, magazines producing long-form journalism have often struggled to stay afloat. Saturday Night, which The Walrus editor John Macfarlane formerly published, lost money continuously despite being a celebrated publication. But as Macfarlane reported in 2011, The Walrus's charitable model, similar to that of Harper's, was thus far sustaining it: donations covered about half of the costs of producing the magazine in 2010, with the traditional revenue streams of circulation and advertising providing the rest. This is especially important for the magazine because its educational mandate requires that it keep a ratio of no less than 70 percent editorial content to 30 percent advertising.
