= DiggyPOD =

American self-publishing company

DiggyPOD Inc.
- Company type: Private
- Genre: Self-publishing
- Founded: 2001; 25 years ago
- Founder: Tim Simpson
- Headquarters: Tecumseh, Michigan, United States
- Products: Book, prints
- Services: print-on-demand
- Website: www.diggypod.com

DiggyPOD is an American privately owned company that prints books on demand for the publishing industry and for self-publishing authors. The company name DiggyPOD is a modified acronym of the phrase “Digital Printing On Demand.”

== History ==
DiggyPOD, Inc. was started in 1988 by Laura Alexander and three partners, and was called Quickprint, Inc. In 2001 Tim Simpson bought the business from Laura Alexander and changed the name to DiggyPOD. Initially the company was located in Saline, Michigan, and served the markets of Saline, Ann Arbor, and Ypsilanti. DiggyPOD was originally a commercial printing company, serving small to large businesses with their printing needs.

In 2003, DiggyPOD was picked for the 2003 Saline Area Chamber of Commerce Enterprise Business Award. In January 2004, Tim Simpson, the owner of DiggyPOD, decided to transform the business from a commercial printing company servicing the surrounding community to a national company in the book publishing industry. In July 2004, DiggyPOD launched a website to cater to the print-on-demand publishing industry. In 2006, DiggyPOD built a new production facility in Saline, Michigan, to increase work capacities. DiggyPOD, in 2008 and 2010, was recognized as a leader in transitioning its business model from a commercial printing company to an on-demand book printing company. In 2012, DiggyPOD sold its commercial printing business and the equipment needed to run the commercial printing to Standard Printing in Ypsilanti, Michigan. This sale of the commercial printing business was used to fund growth of the book printing business and help DiggyPOD move to a bigger facility in Tecumseh, Michigan in 2013.

In 2014, DiggyPOD was included on Forbes' Inc. 5000 List of the Fastest-Growing Private Companies in America.
