= Opyrus =

- Founded: 2008
- Founder: Michael Ashley
- Headquarters: USA

Opyrus was an American self-publishing start-up founded in 2008 as FastPencil by Michael Ashley. They offer a web-based publishing engine that allows authors, publishers, and enterprises to create books in print and EPUB formats and have those books distributed online and in brick-and-mortar stores through partnerships with Amazon, Barnes & Noble, Ingram, and others.

In 2013 FastPencil was acquired by Courier Corporation, but was reacquired in May by its co-founder, Steve Wilson, after Courier's acquisition by R.R. Donnelley in 2015.

As of February 2024 the website is not responding. FastPencil.com and Opyrus.com both lead to a Web Server Default Page from Plesk. By 2026, it redirects to Cloudfare.
