= Five Dials =

Digital literary magazine

- First issue, published June 2008
- Editor: Craig Taylor
- Categories: Literary magazine
- Frequency: Monthly (ish)
- Publisher: Hamish Hamilton
- Total circulation: 140,000 (approx)
- Founded: 2008
- Country: United Kingdom
- Based in: London
- Language: English
- Website: fivedials.com

Five Dials was a digital literary magazine published from London by Hamish Hamilton, an imprint of Penguin Books, between 2008 and 2023. Edited by Craig Taylor, Five Dials featured short fiction, essays, letters, poetry, reporting from around the world (humbly tagged "Currentish Events") and illustrations. The magazine was free and distributed in Portable Document Format (PDF) approximately every month.

Though available online, the magazine was intended to be printed and enjoyed on paper. Five Dials was downloadable from the Hamish Hamilton website, and subscribers received email notifications about new issues. In his editor's letter for the June 2008 inaugural issue, Craig Taylor described Five Dials as “the product of a few editors and writers who would like to push a small enterprise into the inboxes of anyone interested in good writing.” Five Dials closed after 16 years and 66 issues; however, the magazine's complete archive remains available.

== History ==
Named for a seedy and now-extinct part of London named after the junction of five streets (Moor Street, Dudley Street, Little Earl Street, West Street & Grafton Street), and subsequently destroyed between 1883 & 1887 when Cambridge Circus and Charing Cross Road were formed not very far from the current site of Hamish Hamilton's offices on the Strand, Five Dials features work from voices as canny and irrepressible as the misfits who once populated the area. Notable contributors included famous authors living and deceased such as Raymond Chandler, Noam Chomsky, Alain De Botton, Zadie Smith, Dave Eggers, Jonathan Safran Foer, Hari Kunzru, J. M. G. Le Clézio, Deborah Levy and Susan Sontag, but the magazine also showcased work from lesser-known journalists, unpublished creative thinkers and even former nuns. Five Dials was once described as "the biggest literary juggernaut journal never to have hit newsstands".

== Themed issues ==
Since the magazine launched in 2008, there were several themed issues of Five Dials, focusing on a variety of topics including Broken Britain, obscenity, memoir, the late David Foster Wallace and the American elections. The 'Festival Issue' included pieces by musicians from Arcade Fire, James Murphy of LCD Soundsystem and a cameo from Iggy Pop. The fourteenth issue of the magazine was entirely dedicated to Orhan Pamuk's essay, delivered after he won the Nobel Prize for Literature in 2006. Recently "Five Dials" collaborated with the Woodland Trust and novelist Tracy Chevalier on the 22nd issue of the magazine. Among the most popular issues was Five Dials 26, a Berlin special that was downloaded more than 140,000 times. Subsequent issues of Five Dials covered themes such as Jokes, Remixes and Australia.

== Events ==
Five Dials staged several events in the UK and abroad to celebrate the release of the magazine. In September 2009, the Paris issue was launched from the famous Shakespeare and Company bookstore on the Left Bank, with readings from writers Steve Toltz and Joe Dunthorne; the 10th issue was released at an event held in conjunction with Book Slam at London's Wilton's Music Hall in February 2010; and the Quebec issue was launched in Montreal. The magazine attracted positive attention from the Canadian and Québécois press, including the Montreal Mirror, the Montreal Gazette, and The Walrus.

In October 2012, Five Dials released its first single (music) at an event staged at London's Rough Trade (shops) East. The single is a 10" dub remix of Hollis Hampton-Jones's novel Comes the Night, with Hampton-Jones backed by Ryan Norris of Nashville-based band Lambchop. The B-side is an exclusive remix of the Lambchop song "Gone Tomorrow".

== Literary magazine ==
Five Dials was one of several magazines credited with the rebirth of the literary journal, albeit in a slightly different form to publications such as the London Review of Books. Articles either about or referencing Five Dials have appeared in The Guardian, The Times, and UK publishing's trade magazine The Bookseller.

Five Dials was run by Craig Taylor, who was assisted by Hamish Hamilton staff and a team of volunteers in the making of the magazine. Excerpts from Five Dials appeared in The Guardian, and journalists praised its progress, calling Five Dials "understatedly hip", a "heartbreaking PDF of staggering Internet genius" and "handsomely typeset, beautifully illustrated and gloriously devoid of adverts".

== Closure ==
Five Dials ceased producing new editions in 2023, after 16 years, while keeping its complete archive available. Hamish Hamilton explained that the closure was to “make space for all the new talent fizzing at the margins, where we once stood, ready to forge new channels and find new forms,” with co-founders Simon Prosser and Craig Taylor stating: "We founded Five Dials in 2008 – two years after Twitter and two years before Instagram – as one of a new generation of arts magazines, in that era when internet culture was colliding with literary culture in all kinds of exciting, alarming, unexpected ways. We wanted to create something which would be free to all, available online from anywhere in the world, and which would gather the best of the old and the new in surprising, playful combinations."
