= Lorenzo Vitturi =

Venetian archbishop of Candia

- Archbishop of Crete
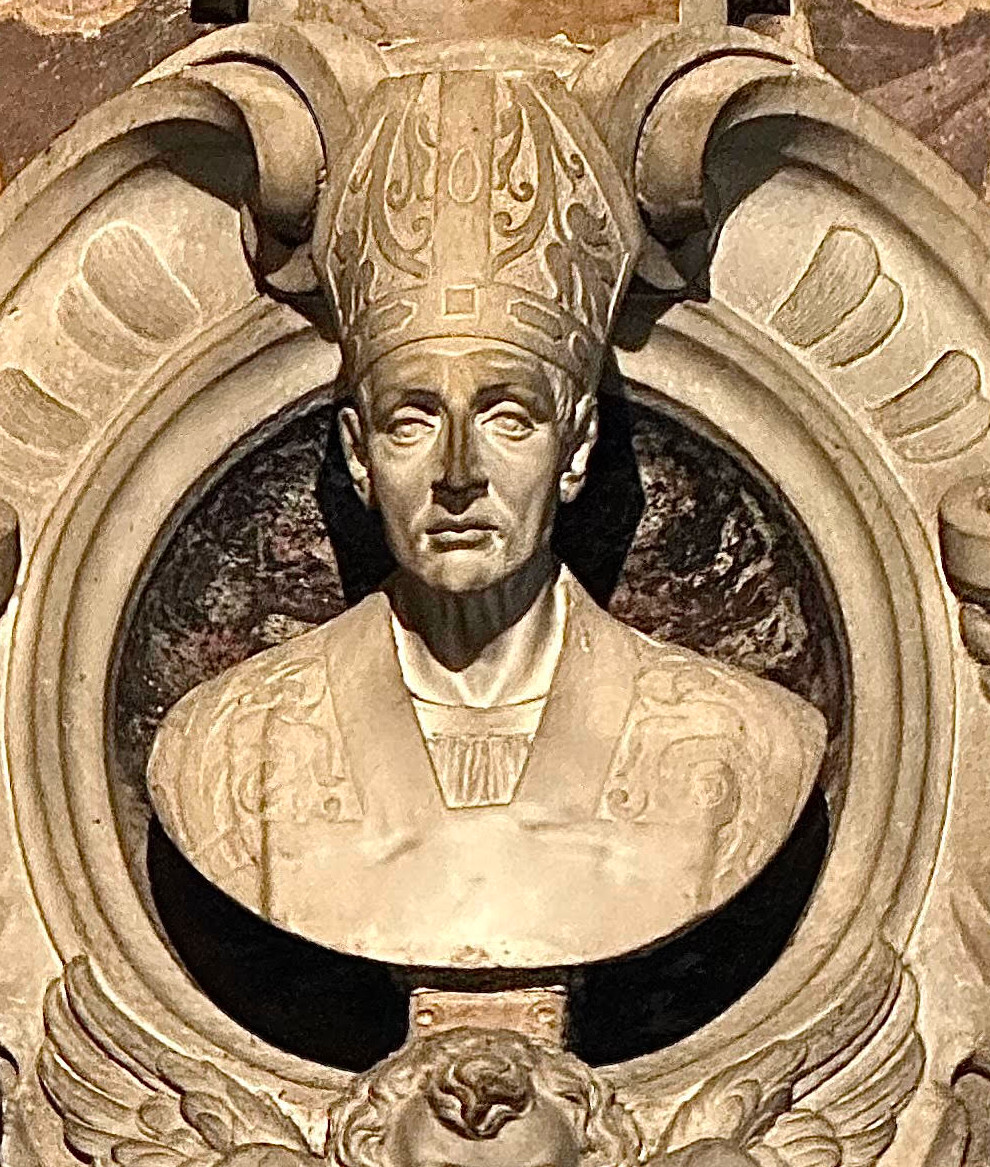
- Church: Catholic Church
- See: Latin Archbishop of Candia (Crete)
- Appointed: 6 February 1576
- Term ended: 9 February 1597

Orders
- Consecration: 3 March 1577 (Bishop) by Giovanni Trevisan Patriarch of Venice

Personal details
- Born: 1543
- Died: 9 February 1597 (aged 53–54) Roma
- Buried: Sant'Onofrio, Rome

Lorenzo Vitturi (Latin: Laurentius Vitrurius; 1543– 1597) was Latin Archbishop of Candia (Crete) from 1576 to 1597.

== Life ==
Lorenzo Vitturi was born on about 1543 in the Venetian noble Vitturi family, son of Daniele. He was the nephew of Pietro Landi, Latin archbishop of Crete (known also as Candia) in the Kingdom of Candia which was at the time under the control of the Republic of Venice. The Landi family kept that archbishopric, with a few exception, since 1458. Lorenzo was grown up in Rome where he studied as an ecclesiastic.

In 1576 his uncle resigned the archbishopric in his favour, and he was appointed archbishop of Crete by Pope Gregory XIII on 6 February 1576. He received the episcopal consecration in the chapel of Saint Justus of the Patriarcal Palace of Castello on 3 March 1577 by the hands of the Patriarch of Venice Giovanni Trevisan, and in the same ceremony he received also the pallium.

Lorenzo Vitturi used to live in Crete, and during the plague of 1591 he behaved heroically by bringing the sacraments to the sicks.

After the 1439 union with the Greek Church, the archbishop of Crete governed both Latin and Orthodox Christians, who succeeded to life together quite peacefully as highly desired by the Venetian government. Lorenzo Vitturi on the other hand tried to enforce the new rules of the Council of Trent to the island, invited Latin preachers who hurt the religiosity of the Greeks, and gave public prominence to the Papal bull in Coena Domini, which was instead opposed by the Venetian government.

The main clash between Vitturi and the Venetian government occurred in 1595 when the government closed the Saint Titus Cathedral due to the danger of contagion from the plague. As response, Vitturi ordered a interdict, i.e. he closed all churches. On the Feast of Corpus Christi of the same year, the officers of the government and a Greek crowd attempted to join the archbishop's procession to pray. Vitturi immediately returned to the Cathedral and closed the doors so as not to allow any liturgical prayer to those affected by the interdict. In the excitement the crowd broke down the door and entered the church, and Vitturi immediately excommunicated that crowd as well as the government officials including the Duke (i.e. governor) of Crete, Marco Antonio Venier.

Upon request of the Doge of Venice, on 16 December 1595 Pope Clement VIII suspended the excommunications issued by Vitturi, and later canceled them. Vitturi was summoned in Venice and later in Rome, where he died on 9 February 1597. He was buried in the church of Sant'Onofrio, his funeral monument is placed over the entrance door.
