= Belej =

Village in Primorje-Gorski Kotar, Croatia

Belej Bellei
- Village
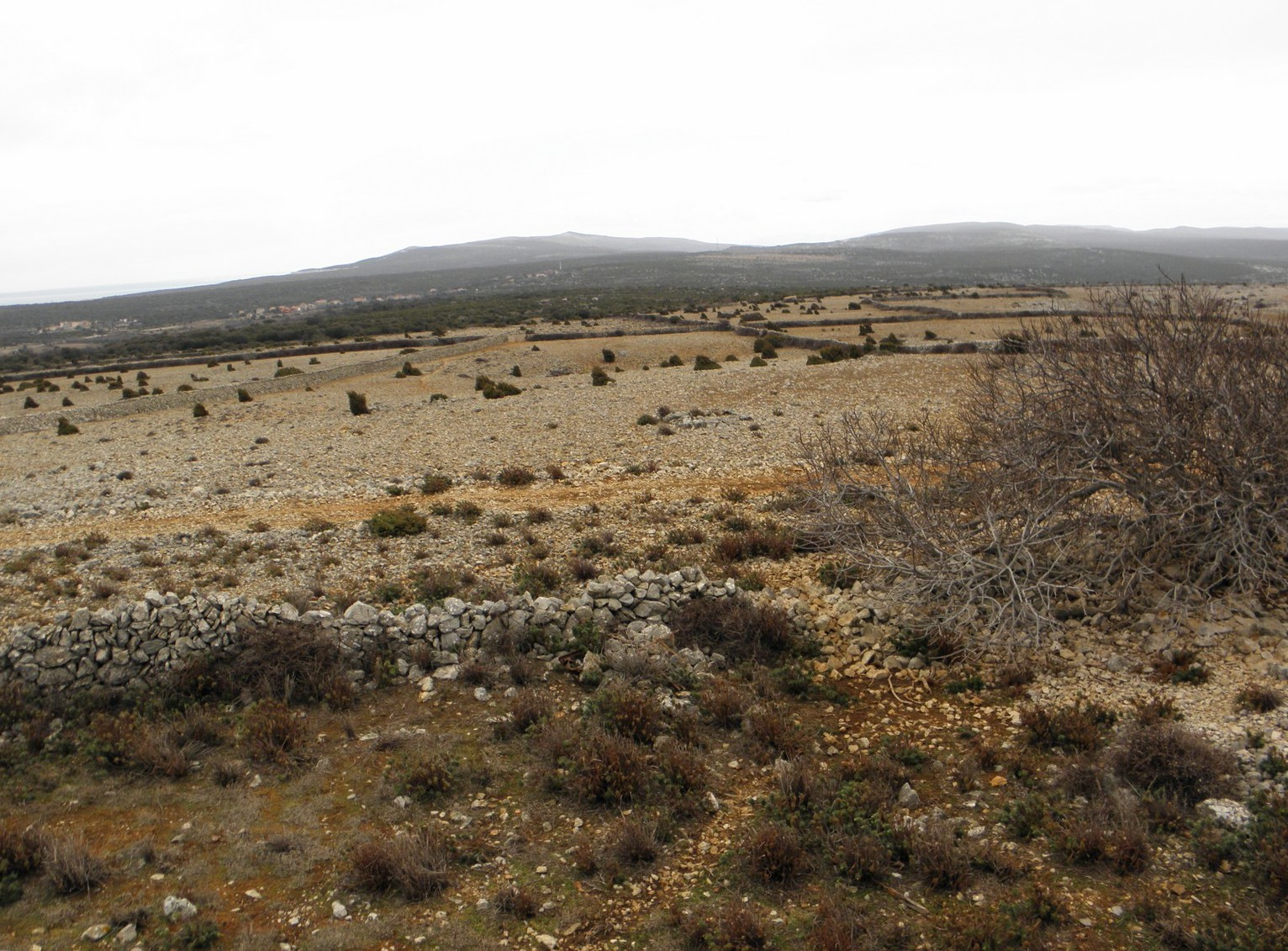
- Landscape near Belej

- Location within Croatia
- Coordinates: 44.83687°N 14.42459°E
- Country: Croatia
- County: Primorje-Gorski Kotar
- Town: Mali Lošinj

Area
  - Total: 32.9 km^{2} (12.7 sq mi)

Population (2021)
  - Total: 40
  - Density: 1.2/km^{2} (3.1/sq mi)
- Time zone: UTC+1 (CET)
  - Summer (DST): UTC+2 (CEST)
- Postal code: 51554
- Area code: 051
- Vehicle registration: RI

Belej (Italian: Bellei, Biancavilla) is a village on the Croatian island of Cres, in Primorje-Gorski Kotar. Administratively, it is part of the town of Mali Lošinj. As of 2021, it had a population of 40. It is connected by the D100 highway.

== History ==
In the summer of 2019, the fire department JVP Grada Mali Lošinj saved a young caver who was stuck 9 10 metres (33 ft) below ground in a cave near Srem, a hamlet of Belej. At 18:00, the HGSS branch in Lošinj received a call about a 17 year old caver, "Luka", who had become lodged in the narrow passage at the end of Nenad Buzjak and Suzana Fielder's 3 April 1977 map of the cave Spilja kod Srema (HR01994). Because of the risk of carbon dioxide buildup, the fire department of Mali Lošinj was called in to provide oxygen during the rescue effort, so they sent Branko Vojniković and David Badurina, who by chance met up with their colleague Saša Mandić, an experienced diver who fortuitously brought diving equipment with him. The HGSS arrived first and tried to extract him to no avail. Mandić, the author of the report and GSS member Marko Župančić entered the cave, mounting the SCBA apparatus to the diving equipment Mandić had brought because the narrows would not permit a regular mask. The final 15 metres (49 ft) was passed only by Mandić, pushing the apparatus in front of him. Only Luka's feet and part of his hips were visible, and Mandić's sensor showed critically dangerous concentrations. Luka had been there several hours, but was still cogent. Mandić decided the only way to free him was to widen the part of the passage above Luka's back, which he then did with his Pulaski. Luka was then able to extract himself, slowly, after which Mandić administered oxygen and the two crawled back to where Vojniković had left them.
