= Treering =

- Industry: Internet
- Founded: San Mateo, California, United States (September 8, 2009)
- Founder: Aaron Greco, Brady McCue, Kevin Zerber, Chris Pratt (co-founders)
- Area served: United States, Canada
- Products: yearbooks
- Website: www.treering.com

Treering is a Silicon Valley, CA-based technology company providing on-demand digital printing of customizable school yearbooks in the US and Canada.

The company designed free software with social-networking features allowing the creation of personalized yearbooks. The company also offers a business model which eliminates the financial cost of yearbooks for schools.

== Features ==
Treering's publishing platform allows the high school community to collaborate on web-based yearbooks saved using cloud storage. Users can add, share, and comment on photos, memories, and events. Students and their parents can customize their copy of the school yearbook by uploading their own content for personalized pages. As a result, in addition to a print version, schools can opt to share an online yearbook.

The company's business model does not impose any financial obligation on schools signing up with Treering. Unlike traditional publishers' business models based on offset printing techniques, there are no minimum orders. The ordering and paying for yearbooks is done online.

== Business activities ==
In 2012, Treering printed 125,000 yearbooks and raised $3.6 million in the first round of venture funding in Silicon Valley. Investors included Mike McCue, Rich Barton, Second Avenue Partners, Cedar Grove Investments, and others.

In 2013 the company served more than 2,000 schools across the US and was anticipating production of over 200,000 yearbooks.

== Social responsibility ==
The company prints its yearbooks on recycled paper and plants a tree for every printed copy.

== Further watching ==
- "A yearbook that looks like Facebook (Video Interview)". CNN Money. 2011. Archived from the original on June 9, 2011. (3:12 minutes) ( Page will play audio when loaded)
- Treering's playlist on YouTube: news coverage from CBS, NBC, ABC, Fox, the CW, etc.
