= Darkside communication group =

Japanese publishing group

Darkside Communication Group (暗黒通信団, Ankoku Tsuushin dan) is a publishing group of Japanese Dōjinshi in Kashiwa city. The group is known in Japan for its scientific and Otaku activities. It was established in the 1990s. Their best known work is Pi one million digits (円周率1000000桁表, Enshuuritu Hyakumanketa Hyou) in 1996. Their monthly magazine Monthly Pi (月刊円周率, Gekkan Enshuuritu) won "Best titled book in Japan (日本タイトルだけ大賞)" in 2012.

== History ==
- 1993: They started by Kana Hoshino.
- 1996: They started to join the Comiket.
- 1999: Their works are introduced in ""ミニコミ魂"" by Tsutomu Kushima.
- 2012: Talking event produced by Junkudo book store in Ikebukuro town.
- 2014: Getting difficultly(入手困難) won the Strange book award(ヘンな本大賞) in Japan.
- 2015: Rocket news (English version) wrote about them.
- 2016: Rocket news (Japanese version) wrote about them.

== Books ==
More than 200 titles are published. Their books are able to classify of three types; number lists, avant-garde books and scientific descriptions.

=== Number lists ===
- One million digits of the circular constant (円周率1000000桁表, 1996, ISBN 978-4-87310-002-9)
- One hundred million digits of the circular constant (円周率一億桁表, 2016, ISBN 978-4-87310-314-3)
- One hundred million digits of the circular constant small edition (円周率100,000,000桁表, 2019, ISBN 978-4-87310-628-1) (It is printed with micro characters similar to the banknote anti-counterfeiting technology.)
- Prime numbers 150000 (素数表150000, 2011, ISBN 978-4-87310-156-9)
- All the O157, Escherichia coli (大腸菌O157のすべて)
- Omega constant, one million digits (オメガ定数100万桁表)
- One million digits of the $\int_{0}^{1}\frac{1}{x^x}\, dx=\sum_{n=1}^\infty\frac{1}{n^n}$ (ISBN 978-4-87310-173-6)
- One million digits of the Euler's constant (オイラー定数1000000桁表, ISBN 978-4-87310-053-1)
- One million digits of the $e^{i\pi}$ ( $e^{i\pi}$1000000桁表, 2016, ISBN 978-4-87310-038-8) (This is a joke book.)
- Monthly Pi (月刊円周率) ISSN 1884-4464
- Monthli Zeta (月刊ゼータ関数のゼロ点) ISSN 2432-7050

Many types of mathematical constants are provided online.

=== Avant-garde books ===
- A cut book (切られた本)
- Just a covered (カバーしかない本)
- Just a book band(オビしかない本)
- Only in NDL(国会図書館にしかない本)
- New Testament for Online Game Enthusiasts: Gospel of Mark (ネトゲ廃人のための新約聖書)

=== Scientific descriptions ===
- Quantum mechanics on 32 pages (32ページの量子力学入門, 2010, ISBN 978-4873100357)
- Unexpected Science Magazine 2015 (サイエンスアゴラ2015とっぱつ合同誌！)
- Learning for Pattern Recognition and Machine Learning (パターン認識と機械学習の学習)

=== Others ===
- My use of money charges is wrong as I expected (やはり俺のソシャゲ課金は間違っているだろうか)

== Members ==
- Kana Hoshino acts for the group.
- Shinkiroh Shiroma was a writer in past.
- Shi is a main writer in the group.
- Takaki Makino wrote the 円周率1000000桁表 in 1996.
- Shigeo Mitsunari wrote パターン認識と機械学習の学習 which gave explanations of Pattern Recognition and Machine Learning by prof. Bishop.

Over ten other members write books and sell their books in the Comiket.

== Performances ==
- They sell their books using a weight indicator in the Comiket.
- They discount their books by amount of Pi memorized in the Comiket.
- Coupon tickets are often issued in the Comiket.
- Shi cantillated the Pi in the Comiket Special 4.
