= Llumina Press =

Publishing company

Llumina Press was a print-on-demand self-publishing, and distribution company founded by Deborah Greenspan in 2000.

== Notable books ==
In 2005, Llumina Press acquired the rights to Phantom by bestselling author Susan Kay, also author of the worldwide bestseller, Legacy.

Llumina’s book, The Viagra Diaries by Barbara Rose Brooker was acquired by Simon & Schuster and optioned by HBO for a television series.

Bailey, A. Peter (2013). Witnessing Brother Malcolm X: The Master Teacher. Plantation, Fla.: Llumina Press. ISBN 978-1-62550-039-7.
