= Josef Kurz (scholar) =

Czech linguist and Slavist (1901–1972)

- Born: 3 February 1901; Prague, Bohemia, Austria-Hungary
- Died: 6 December 1972 (aged 71); Prague, Czechoslovakia
- Known for: Research on Old Church Slavonic syntax; early editorship of Slovník jazyka staroslověnského

Academic background
- Education: Charles University

Academic work
- Discipline: Slavic studies, historical linguistics
- Sub-discipline: Old Church Slavonic, syntax, textual criticism, lexicography
- Institutions: Masaryk University; Charles University
- Notable students: Radoslav Večerka

Josef Kurz (3 February 1901 – 6 December 1972) was a Czech philologist, Slavist and university professor who specialised in Old Church Slavonic, the history of Slavic writing and the study of early Slavic manuscripts. He taught at Masaryk University in Brno and Charles University in Prague. His research focused especially on Old Church Slavonic grammar and syntax, the relationship between Slavic translations and their Greek source texts, and the critical editing of manuscript sources.

Kurz was an early organiser and chief editor of the multi-volume Old Church Slavonic dictionary Slovník jazyka staroslověnského (Lexicon linguae palaeoslovenicae). He also chaired an international commission concerned with dictionaries of Church Slavonic and prepared scholarly editions of the Codex Assemanius. His work extended to the history of Slavic philology and the teaching of Old Church Slavonic.

== Life and career ==
Kurz was born on 3 February 1901 in Prague in Bohemia, then part of Austria-Hungary. From 1919 to 1924 he studied Slavic philology, comparative Indo-European linguistics and Romance philology at the Faculty of Arts of Charles University. His teachers included František Pastrnek, Josef Zubatý and Oldřich Hujer. His dissertation for the Czech PhDr. qualification, defended in 1924, concerned the Codex Zographensis, an Old Church Slavonic Gospel manuscript.

After serving as an assistant at Charles University in 1925–1926, Kurz taught in secondary schools in Prague. During the first half of the 1930s he was a lecturer in Czech language and literature at the University of Warsaw before returning to Prague. He completed his habilitation at Charles University in 1939. In 1945 he was appointed professor of Slavic linguistics at Masaryk University, becoming head of its Slavic studies department in 1950. In 1956 he moved to the Faculty of Arts at Charles University, where he taught Old Church Slavonic, comparative Slavic grammar and Serbo-Croatian studies.

Kurz received the further academic qualification DrSc. (Doctor of Sciences) in 1964. He lectured at universities abroad and participated in international congresses of Slavists. He became a member of the Czech Academy of Sciences and Arts in 1948 and a corresponding member of the Yugoslav Academy of Sciences and Arts (now the Croatian Academy of Sciences and Arts) in 1965. He also received Bulgaria's Order of Cyril and Methodius, First Class.

Kurz died in Prague on 6 December 1972, at the age of 71.

Kurz's personal papers are held by the Masaryk Institute and Archives of the Czech Academy of Sciences under collection number NAD 517.

== Scholarship ==
=== Old Church Slavonic grammar and syntax ===
Old Church Slavonic syntax was a central subject of Kurz's scholarship. He investigated the use of pronouns and participles, the historical development of grammatical categories and the relationship between constructions in Slavic translations and their Greek models. His extended study K otázce členu v jazycích slovanských se zvláštním zřetelem k staroslověnštině ("On the question of the article in the Slavic languages, with particular reference to Old Church Slavonic") appeared in two parts in Byzantinoslavica: volume 7 (1937–1938) and volume 8 (dated 1939, but not published until 1946).

Kurz argued that Old Church Slavonic had not developed a grammatical category equivalent to the article. In his interpretation, certain uses of the relative pronoun iže corresponding to the Greek article were better understood as features of translation rather than evidence of an independently established Slavic article.

The linguist Radoslav Večerka, who studied with Kurz, later characterised his teacher's approach as a detailed philological examination of texts, supported by comparison with Greek and other originals and by historical-comparative linguistics. Večerka also identified limitations in arguments that relied on an intuitive reconstruction of how early translators understood linguistic forms; in his assessment, some of Kurz's particular observations remained useful despite subsequent methodological developments.

=== Manuscript studies and scholarly editions ===
Kurz studied early Glagolitic and Old Church Slavonic manuscripts and helped prepare scholarly editions of them. Together with Josef Vajs, he produced the first volume (1929) of an edition of the Codex Assemanius, an eleventh-century Glagolitic Gospel book; the volume included a facsimile of the manuscript. Kurz prepared the second volume, published in 1955, with a Cyrillic transliteration of the text and scholarly apparatus.

He also examined Glagolitic texts from the Croatian tradition. One of his studies concerned a fragment of a fourteenth-century Psalter discovered in 1952 at the Emmaus Monastery in Prague. According to the Croatian scholar Anica Nazor, Kurz used the fragment to support an earlier hypothesis that the Croatian Glagolitic tradition had preserved features of the original Slavic translation more faithfully than the eleventh-century Psalterium Sinaiticum. He argued that the Sinai manuscript reflected a later revision of the Psalter text.

=== Lexicography and international scholarly cooperation ===
From the 1940s onward, Kurz was involved in the preparation of Slovník jazyka staroslověnského (Lexicon linguae palaeoslovenicae), an academic dictionary based on Old Church Slavonic texts and selected later Church Slavonic material. According to Nazor, he was among the project's initiators and organisers and served as its chief editor during its early stages. The dictionary began appearing in fascicles in 1958; the first complete volume was published in 1966 and the second in 1973, after Kurz's death. The third and fourth volumes followed in 1982 and 1997 under subsequent editorial leadership. His contribution to the dictionary was principally organisational and editorial.

A separate undertaking was his work with the International Committee of Slavists. Kurz chaired its commission for Church Slavonic dictionaries from 1958 until his death in 1972. Nazor credited him with initiating a proposal for a dictionary of the later literary Church Slavonic language, drawing on monuments from the twelfth to the sixteenth centuries. The proposal received support at the Fourth International Congress of Slavists in 1958, when an international commission was established. This international initiative had a different scope and institutional history from the Prague Old Church Slavonic dictionary.

=== History of Slavic studies and teaching ===
Kurz also wrote on the history of Slavic philology, including studies of Josef Dobrovský, Pavel Jozef Šafařík and Vatroslav Jagić. He prepared and revised teaching materials for Old Church Slavonic. In 1949 he revised and supplemented study texts originally compiled by Miloš Weingart, and in 1969 he published his own textbook of Old Church Slavonic. Among the scholars he taught was Radoslav Večerka, who subsequently published studies of Kurz's research and its place in the history of Old Church Slavonic syntax.

== Selected publications ==
The following list distinguishes Kurz's own studies and textbooks from manuscripts, readers and collective publications that he edited or prepared with other scholars.

=== Studies and textbooks ===
- Kurz, Josef (1937–1938). "K otázce členu v jazycích slovanských se zvláštním zřetelem k staroslověnštině". Byzantinoslavica (in Czech). 7: 212–340.; continued in Kurz, Josef (1939). "K otázce členu v jazycích slovanských se zvláštním zřetelem k staroslověnštině". Byzantinoslavica (in Czech). 8: 172–288. (issued in 1946).
- Kurz, Josef (1969). Učebnice jazyka staroslověnského (in Czech). Prague.. Textbook of Old Church Slavonic.
- Kurz, Josef (1972). Kapitoly ze syntaxe a z morfologie staroslověnského jazyka (in Czech). Prague.. Studies of Old Church Slavonic syntax and morphology.
- Kurz, Josef (1963). "Проблематика исследования синтаксиса старославянского языка". Исследования по синтаксису старославянского языка (in Russian). Prague. pp. 5–14.; and Kurz, Josef (1963). "Проблема члена в старославянском языке". Исследования по синтаксису старославянского языка (in Russian). Prague. pp. 121–182.. Two contributions by Kurz to a collective volume on Old Church Slavonic syntax.

=== Editions, co-authored works and editorial work ===
- Vajs, Josef; Kurz, Josef, eds. (1929). Evangeliář Assemanův (Evangeliarium Assemani) (in Czech). Vol. 1.. Jointly prepared facsimile edition of the Codex Assemanius.
- Kurz, Josef, ed. (1955). Evangeliář Assemanův (Evangeliarium Assemani) (in Czech). Vol. 2. Prague.. Text edition with transliteration and critical apparatus.
- Weingart, Miloš (1949). Texty ke studiu jazyka a písemnictví staroslověnského (in Czech). Revised and expanded by Josef Kurz (2nd ed.). Prague..
- Kurz, Josef, ed. (1963). Исследования по синтаксису старославянского языка: сборник статей (in Russian). Prague: Publishing House of the Czechoslovak Academy of Sciences.. Collective volume edited by Kurz; he also contributed individual chapters.
- Kurz, Josef; Řeháček, Luboš; Večerka, Radoslav (1970). Čítanka staroslověnských textů se slovníčkem (in Czech). Prague.. Old Church Slavonic text reader with a glossary, co-authored with Luboš Řeháček and Radoslav Večerka; first published in 1967.
- Slovník jazyka staroslověnského (Lexicon linguae palaeoslovenicae) (in Czech). Vol. 1. Josef Kurz, chief editor during the early phase. Prague. 1966.. The second completed volume appeared in 1973.
