= Codex Assemanius =

Old Church Slavonic manuscript

Codex Assemanius (scholarly abbreviation Ass) is a rounded Glagolitic Old Church Slavonic canon evangeliary consisting of 158 illuminated parchment folios, dated to early 11th century. The manuscript is created in the Ohrid Literary School based in Ohrid, Macedonia.

== Name and library ==
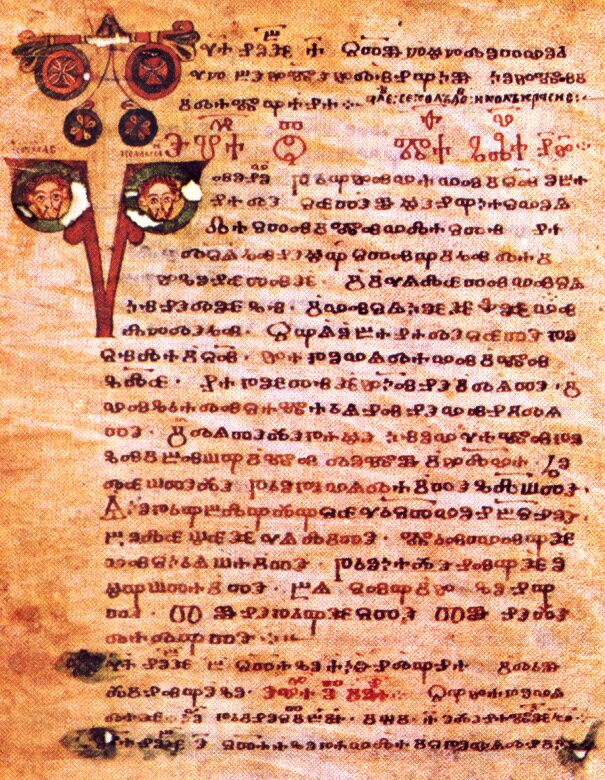
Menologion with the lesson (Mat. 10:1-8) for Cosmas and Damian (heads in the majuscule), 1 November (Biblioteca apostolica vaticana, Cod. Vat. slav. 3, f.125v)

The Codex is named after its discoverer, Italian Maronite scholar and Vatican librarian of Lebanese origin Giuseppe Simone Assemani, who discovered it and bought it in Jerusalem in 1736. His nephew Stefano Evodio donated it to the Vatican Library, where the codex is still kept today.

== Composition ==
By content it is an Aprakos (weekly, service) Gospel. It contains only pericopes (starting with the beginning of the Gospel of John), i.e. lectures prepared for the celebrations in church. At the end of the manuscript there is a Menologium which has lessons to be read during the feasts of the menaion (Sts. Demetrius, Theodosius, Clement and other saints). The codex is held by many to be the most beautiful Old Church Slavonic book.

== History of research and editions ==
The first person to write about the codex was Mateo Karaman in his work Identitá della lingua letterale slava (manuscript, Zadar 1746). The manuscript was published by Franjo Rački at the urging of Pavel Jozef Šafárik in Zagreb in 1865, Ivan Črnčić (Assemanovo izborno evangjelje; Rome 1878, published privately, transcribed in Latin), Josef Vajs and Josef Kurz (Evangeliář Assemanův, Kodex vatikánský 3. slovanský, 2. vols, Prague 1929, ČSAV, phototypical edition) - republished by Josef Kurz in 1966 in Cyrillic transcription. The newest Bulgarian edition is by Vera Ivanova-Mavrodinova and Aksinia Džurova from 1981 (Asemanievo evangelie; Sofia: Nauka i izkustvo), with facsimile reproductions.

== Linguistic description ==
The manuscript abounds with ligatures. Linguistic analysis has shown that the manuscript is characterized by frequent vocalizations of yers (ъ > o, ь > e), occasional loss of epenthesis, and ь is frequently replaced with hard ъ, esp. after r. These are the traits pointing to the Macedonian area, and are shared with Codex Marianus. Yers are also frequently omitted word-finally, and occasionally non-etymologically mixed (ь being written after k and g).

== See also ==
- Codex Marianus
- Codex Zographensis
- List of Glagolitic manuscripts (900–1199)
- Lists of Glagolitic manuscripts

== Bibliography ==
- Damjanović, Stjepan (2004). Slovo iskona. Zagreb: Matica hrvatska. ISBN 953-150-567-5.
- Schenker, Alexander (1995). The Dawn of Slavic: An Introduction to Slavic Philology. New Haven: Yale University Press. ISBN 0-300-05846-2.
- Horvat, Karlo (1911). "Glagolitica Vaticana". Starine Jugoslavenske akademija znanosti i umjetnosti (in Latin). XXXIII: 506–536. Esp. p. 533.
