= Codex Marianus =

Old Church Slavonic Gospel manuscript

- Language: Old Church Slavonic
- Genre: Gospel Book

The Codex Marianus is an Old Church Slavonic tetraevangelion written in Glagolitic script, dated to the beginning of the 11th century, which is (along with the Codex Zographensis), one of the oldest manuscript witnesses to the Old Church Slavonic language, one of the two tetraevangelions being part of the Old Church Slavonic canon.

== History ==
Most of the Codex (172 folios, 171 according to some sources) was discovered by Victor Grigorovich at Mount Athos during a journey to the Balkans in 1844-45, in a hermitage belonging to the "Monastery of the Holy Mother of God" (the Blessed Theotokos), and thus the manuscript was named the Codex Marianus in Latin. Grigorovich took the found folios to Kazan', and after his death in 1876 the Codex was transferred to Russian State Library in Moscow where it carries the catalog number грнг 6 (M.1689). Croatian diplomat and amateur scholar Antun Mihanović acquired 2 folios (containing Matthew 5.23 - 6.16) some time before Grigorovich made his discovery, and sent it to renowned Slovene Slavist Franz Miklosich, who had them published in 1850. After Miklosich's death, the two-folio fragment was deposited in the Austrian National Library in Vienna under the catalogue number Cod. Slav. 146.

The Codex was first published by the Croatian Slavist Vatroslav Jagić in 1883 in Berlin and Saint Petersburg as Quattuor Evangeliorum versionis palaeoslovenicae Codex Marianus Glagoliticus / Маріинское четвероевангеліе, transcribed in Cyrillic script and with extensive philological commentary in Russian. A reprint was published in Graz in 1960.

== Linguistic analysis and origin ==
The text of the Codex especially abounds with the usage of asigmatic aorist, and very frequent is the assimilation of vowels in compound adjectival declension and present forms (-aago, -uumu instead of -aego, -uemu; -aatъ instead of -aetъ etc.).

Analysing the language of the Codex, Vatroslav Jagić concluded that one of the scribes of the Codex came from the Eastern-rite Štokavian area (see Serbian recension), on the basis of substitutions ǫ → u, y → i, vъ- → u-, ę → e, etc. The conclusion about Serbian origin of the Codex has been disputed by Russian slavist Alexander Budilovich who believed that the Codex was written in northern Albania, in northern Macedonia or Mount Athos, in Bulgarian language environment, with only slight admixtures of Serbian elements. At the same time the Bulgarian researcher Lyubomir Miletich analysing some dialectal characteristics, claimed Western Bulgarian origin (from Macedonia) of the Codex.

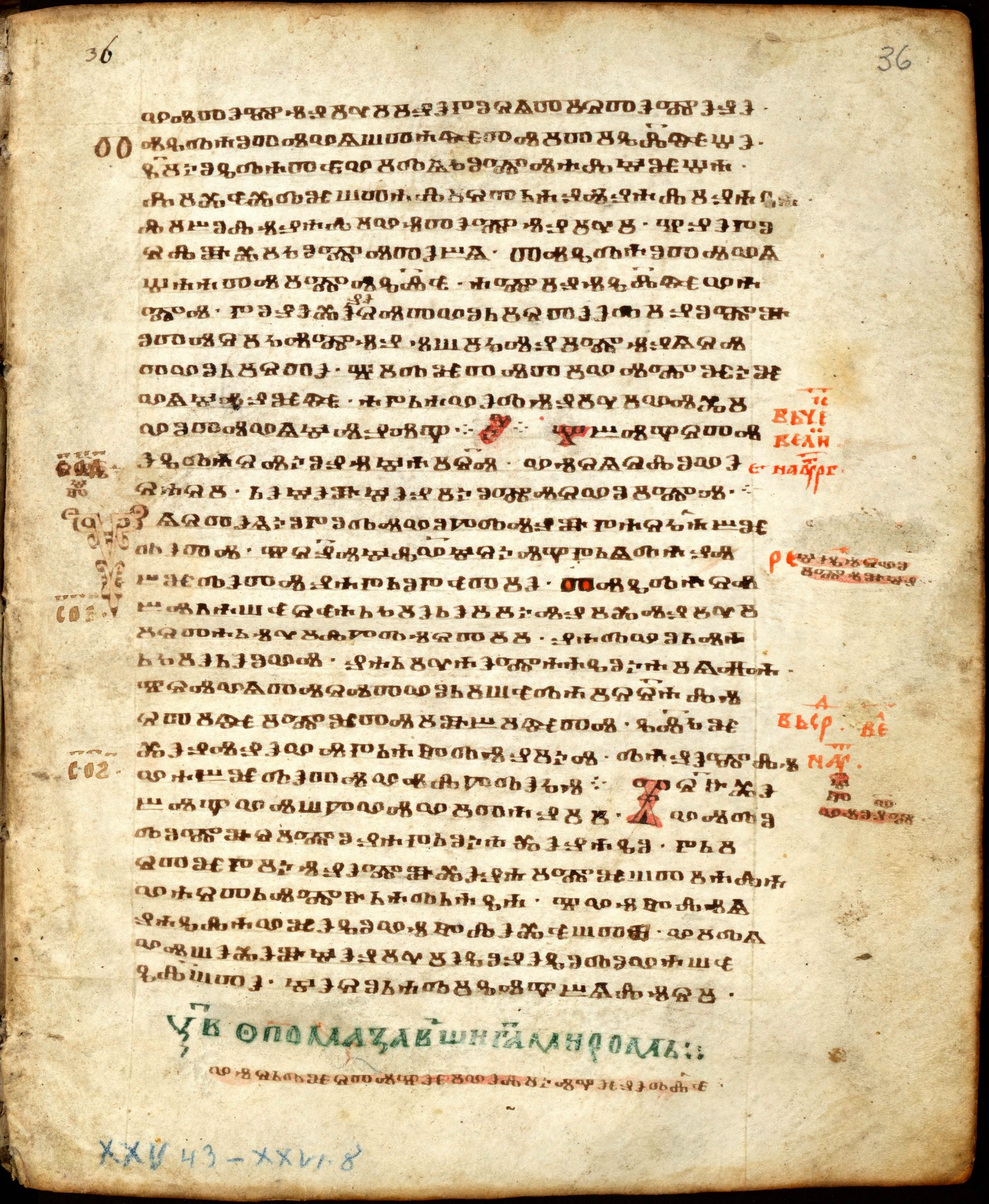
Codex Marianus

Later researchers as Josip Hamm have noted that vocalization of yers (ъ > o, ь > e), as well as the occasional disappearance of epenthetic l, suggests Macedonian provenience. According to F. Curta, the book was "certainly of Macedonian origin", written "either in Ohrid or in one of the monastic centers in the region." According to H. G. Lunt, "Certain deviations from the theoretical norms indicate Macedonian influences, others possibly Serbian (if not northern Macedonian)". There are a number of arguments that link the Codex Marianus with Bulgarian territory that bordered that of Serbia. It is difficult to answer whether the Codex was created before the end of the First Bulgarian Empire (1018), or after its Byzantine conquest, i.e. into the theme of Bulgaria. Lunt proposed the 1030s, but David Diringer dates it to the late 10th century.

A University of Vienna team published a multispectral analysis of the parchment and ink of Marianus in 2021, concluding on graphemic grounds that it was closest to the Fragmenta Vindobonensia, which they noted was "usually attributed to either Southern Croatia or Hum, i.e. the neighborhood of Duklja", in provenance. Arguing for a Duklja provenance themselves, they adduced the evidence of a Latin letter on folio 1r discovered by Repp but "forgotten". They dated the manuscript to the period 1012–1039. Spectrally, some Sinaitic Glagolitic manuscripts share with it a green pigment not found in other Glagolitic manuscripts from the Western Balkans

Due to its archaic nature, the Codex forms the base text for the critical edition of the Old Church Slavonic New Testament in the series Novum Testamentum Palaeoslovenice.

== Reproductions ==
List of reproductions of text from Codex Marianus in literary anthologies:

- Grammatika jazyka starobulharského (1885) pp. 50–52
- Čitanka iz književnih starina staroslovenskih, hrvatskih i srpskih za VII. i VIII. razred srednjih škola (1923 ed.) pp. 65–66
- Хрестоматия по древне-церковно-славянскому и русскому языкам I (1904) pp. 68–76.
- Církevněslovanská chrestomatie (1925) pp. 13–14.
- Пам’ѧтки старо-слов’ѧнської мови Х–XI віків (1929) pp. 294–299.

== See also ==
- Codex Assemanius
- Codex Zographensis
- List of Glagolitic manuscripts (900–1199)
- Lists of Glagolitic manuscripts
