= Codex Zographensis =

Illuminated Old Church Slavonic canon manuscript

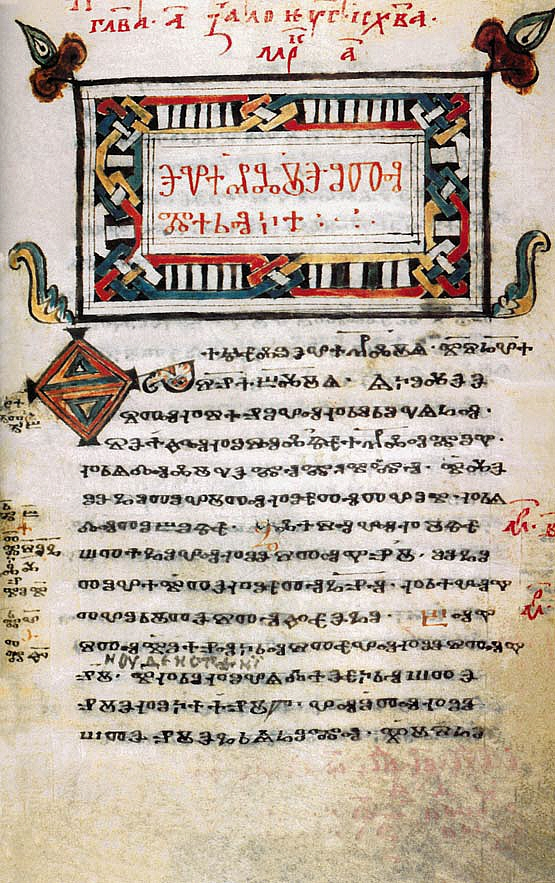
Codex Zographensis with the beginning of Mark's Gospel "ⰵⰲⰰⰼ[ⰵ]ⰾⰻⰵ ⱁⱅⱏ ⰿⰰⱃⱏⰽⰰ (Єваꙉлїе отъ Маръка)" (Saint Petersburg, National Library of Russia, Ms. глаг. 1, f.77r)

The Codex Zographensis (or Tetraevangelium Zographense; scholarly abbreviation Zo) is an illuminated Old Church Slavonic canon manuscript. It is composed of 304 parchment folios; the first 288 are written in Glagolitic containing Gospels and organised as Tetraevangelium (Matthew, Mark, Luke, and John), and the rest written in Cyrillic containing a 13th-century synaxarium. It is dated back to the end of the 10th or beginning of the 11th century.

== Discovery and publishing ==
The manuscript originally belonged to the Bulgarian Zograf Monastery on Mount Athos. It is said that it was kept at a conventual church near Ierisso and later transferred to the monastery's library. In 1843, the Croatian writer and Habsburgian diplomat Antun Mihanović discovered the manuscript during his stay at the monastery. The codex's importance was announced by the Russian historian and folklorist Victor Grigorovich who visited the monastery one year later and who is regarded as the founder of Slavonic studies in Russia. Izmail Sreznevsky published a first transcription of some parts of the manuscript in 1856. In 1860 monks from the Zograf monastery donated the Codex to the Russian emperor Alexander II. The donation was transferred to Russia during an archaeological expedition of Pyotr Sevastyanov (1811-1867). In 1862, this archaeological collection was divided and transferred to different institutions in Moscow and Saint Petersburg. The Glagolitic codex became part of the collection of the Imperial Public Library, where the Codex is kept until today. The first who described the codex was Victor Grigorovich in 1877, and two years later the Glagolitic part of the codex was published by the Slavist Vatroslav Jagić in Berlin as Quattuor evangeliorum codex glagoliticus olim Zographensis nunc Petropolitanus, completely transcribed in Cyrillic, with an introduction and an extensive philological commentary in Latin. Jagić's edition has been reprinted as a facsimile edition in Graz in 1954. Other scholars who have extensively studied the language of Codex Zographensis were Josef Kurz, Leszek Moszyński and the librarian Vyacheslav Zagrebin who was responsible for its restoration during the 1990s. During January 2016, monks of the Zograf monastery visited Saint Petersburg in order to report about a digitisation project of the manuscript which intended to make it available to the public. As result of their diplomatic visit a Zographensis room was established at the SS. Cyril and Methodius National Library in Sofia, and a virtual exhibition of the whole manuscript with a modernised transcription was published at the homepage of the Russian National Library.

== Content ==
The manuscript contains 304 parchment folios. The first few ones have not been preserved, and thus it begins with Matthew 3:11 and ends with John, with Mt 16:20-24:20 being later insertion in Old Church Slavonic Grammar. In total, the first 288 folios are written in Glagolitic and contain Gospel text. In addition, several additional folios from the middle of the manuscript are missing. At the end of the 11th or beginning of the 12th century some missing folios (from 41 to 57) were replaced with 17 new ones, written in square Glagolitic. They were themselves most likely a palimpsest. The rest of the 16 folios contain 13th-century synaxarium.

== Origin and linguistic features ==
Along with the slightly older Codex Marianus it is an important document for its use of the round Glagolitic script, the oldest recorded Slavic alphabet. By analyzing the language of the codex it was established that the style and antiquity of the text is nonuniform, second part being more archaic than the first part. Some scholars explain this by gradual adaptation to the language of the source from which the manuscript originated. Generally, phonology of the language of Codex Zographensis is archaic - vocalizations of strong yers are rare, epenthetic l is preserved, though in most parts of the manuscript yers are being assimilated. It is a bit less archaic with respect to morphology and syntax, though the forms of definite declension of adjectives and older forms of participles are well-preserved (e.g. prošь, nošь and rarely prosivъ, nosivъ).

== Gallery ==
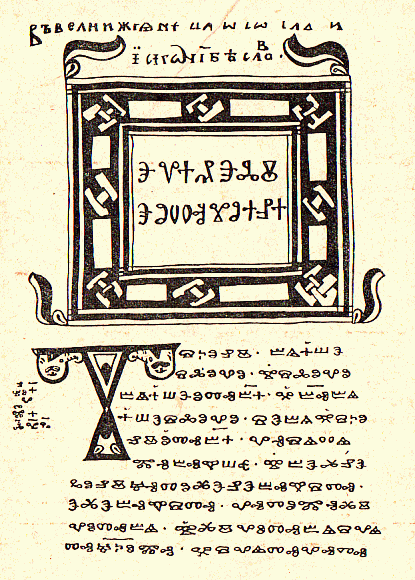
Codex Zographensis with the Gospel of St John (Zograf monastery, Ms. глаг. 1, f.225r)

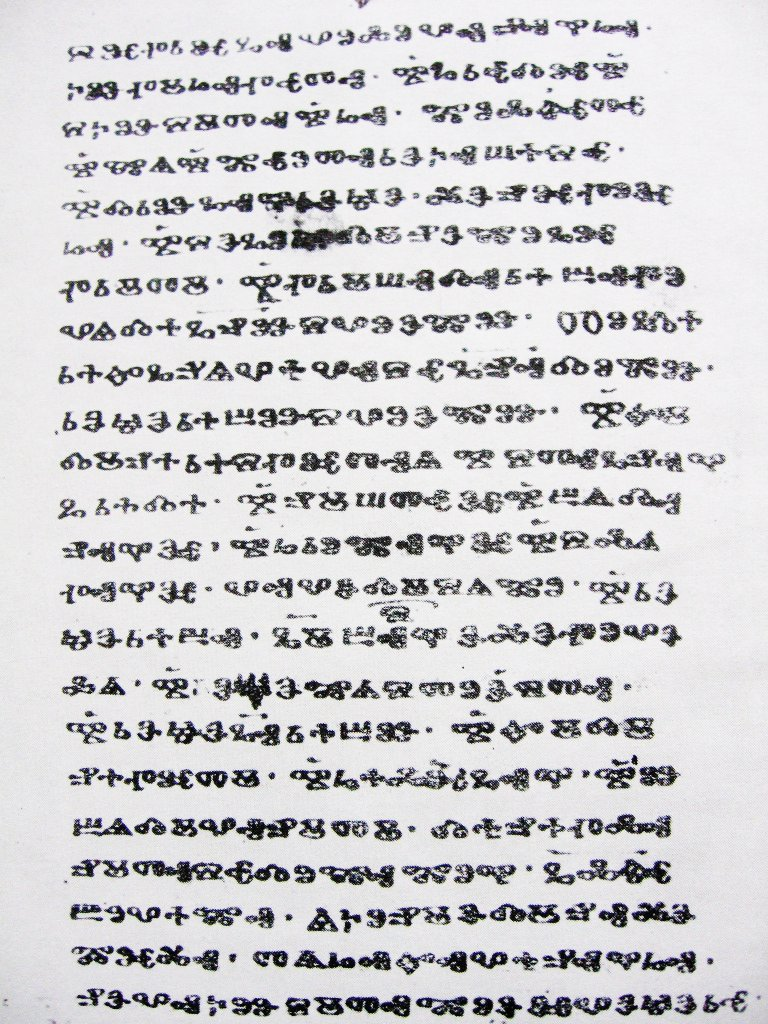
A page from the Codex Zographensis with text of the Gospel according to St Luke XIV, 19-24 (Zograf monastery, Ms. глаг. 1, f.187v)

== See also ==
- Codex Assemanius
- Codex Marianus
- List of Glagolitic manuscripts (900–1199)
- Lists of Glagolitic manuscripts
- Psalterium Sinaiticum
