= Old Church Slavonic =

Medieval Slavic literary language

- Old Church Slavic
- ⱄⰾⱁⰲⱑⱀⱐⱄⰽⱏ ⱗⰸⱏⰺⰽⱏ словѣньскъ ѩꙁꙑкъ
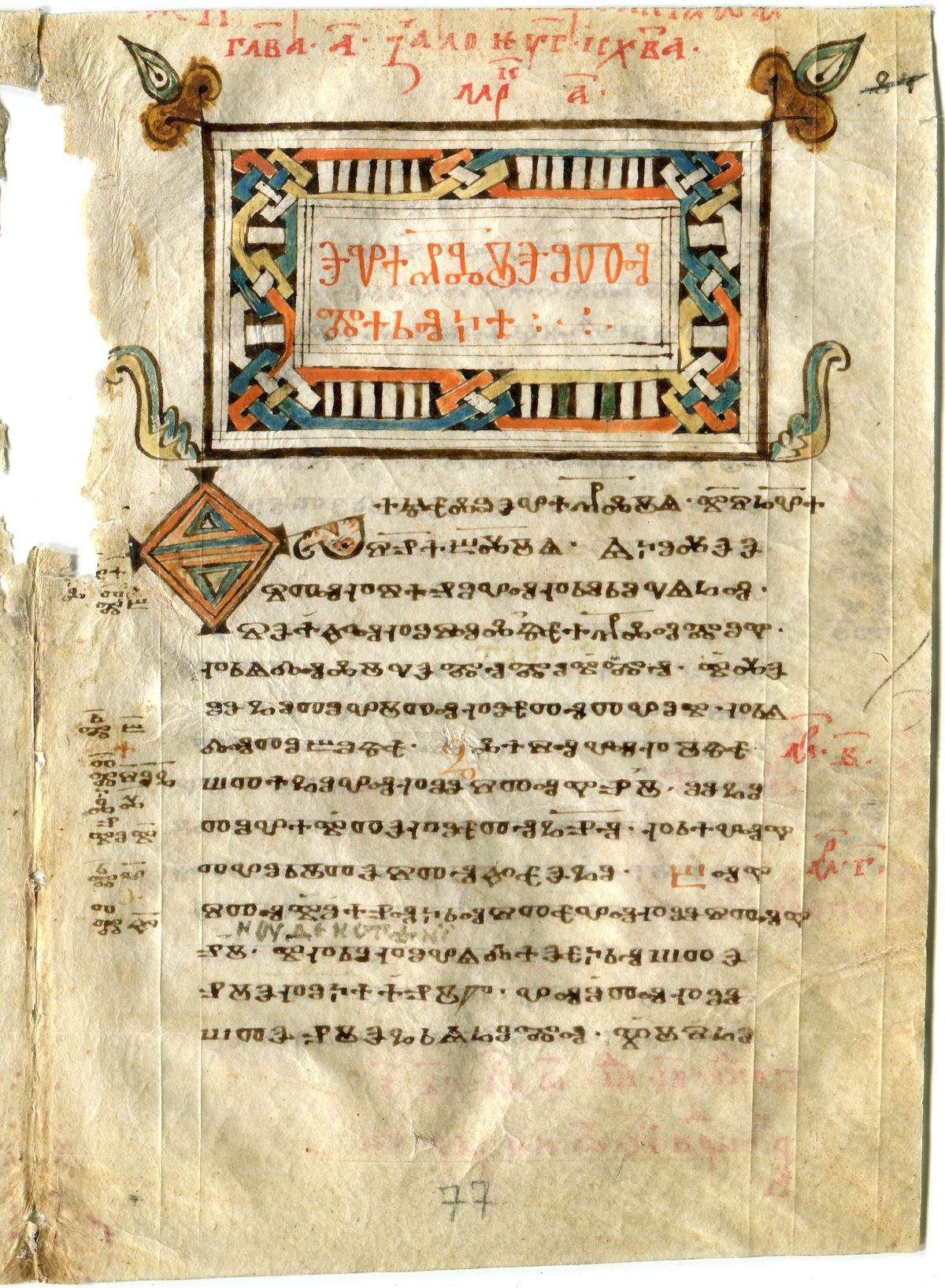
- A page from Codex Zographensis, 10th or 11th century.
- Region: Southeastern Europe; Eastern Europe; Central Europe
- Era: 9th–11th centuries; then evolved into several variants of Church Slavonic including Middle Bulgarian
- Language family: Indo-European: Balto-Slavic; Slavic; South Slavic; Eastern South Slavic; Old Church Slavonic
- Writing system: Glagolitic, Cyrillic

Language codes
- ISO 639-1: cu
- ISO 639-2: chu
- ISO 639-3: chu (includes Church Slavonic)
- Glottolog: chur1257 Church Slavic
- Linguasphere: 53-AAA-a

Old Church Slavonic (OCS) or Old Slavonic (/sləˈvɒnɪk, slæˈvɒn-/ slə-VON-ik, slav-ON-) (Note: Also known as Old Church Slavic, Old Slavic (/ˈslɑːvɪk, ˈslævɪk-/ SLAH-vik, SLAV-ik-), Paleo-Slavic, Paleoslavic, Palaeo-Slavic, Palaeoslavic (not to be confused with Proto-Slavic), or sometimes as Old Bulgarian, Old Macedonian, or Old Slovenian.) is the first Slavic literary language and the oldest extant written Slavonic language attested in literary sources. It belongs to the Eastern South Slavic subgroup of the South Slavic branch of the Slavic language family and is the ancestor of Church Slavonic, which remains the liturgical language of many Christian Orthodox churches.

Historians credit the 9th-century Byzantine missionaries Saints Cyril and Methodius with standardizing the language and undertaking the task of translating the Gospels and necessary liturgical books into it as part of the Christianization of the Slavs. It is thought to have been based primarily on the dialect of the 9th-century Slavs living in the Byzantine theme of Thessalonica. The oldest manuscript is usually thought to be the Kiev Missal.

Old Church Slavonic became the official language of the First Bulgarian Empire and played an important role in the history of the Slavic languages serving as a basis and model for later Church Slavonic traditions. Some Eastern Orthodox and Eastern Catholic churches use these Church Slavonic recensions as a liturgical language to this day.

As the oldest attested Slavic language, Old Church Slavonic provides important evidence for the features of Proto-Slavic, the reconstructed common ancestor of all Slavic languages.

== Nomenclature ==
The name of the language in Old Church Slavonic texts was simply Slavic (словѣньскъ ѩꙁꙑкъ, slověnĭskŭ językŭ), derived from the word for Slavs (словѣнє, slověne), the self-designation of the compilers of the texts. This name is preserved in the modern native names of the Slovak and Slovene languages. The terms Slavic and Slavonic are interchangeable in English. The language is sometimes called Old Slavic, which may be confused with the distinct Proto-Slavic language. Bulgarian, Croatian, Macedonian, Serbian, Slovene and Slovak linguists have claimed Old Church Slavonic; thus OCS has also been variously called Old Bulgarian, Old Macedonian, Old Slovenian, Old Croatian, or Old Serbian, or even Old Slovak. The commonly accepted terms in modern English-language Slavic studies are Old Church Slavonic and Old Church Slavic.

The term Old Bulgarian (Bulgarian: старобългарски, German: Altbulgarisch) is the designation used by most Bulgarian-language writers. It was used in numerous 19th-century sources, e.g. by August Schleicher, Martin Hattala, Leopold Geitler and August Leskien, who noted similarities between the first literary Slavic works and the modern Bulgarian language. For similar reasons, Russian linguist Aleksandr Vostokov used the term Slav-Bulgarian. The term is still used by some writers but nowadays normally avoided in favor of Old Church Slavonic. The term Old Macedonian is occasionally used by Western scholars in a regional context. According to Slavist Henrik Birnbaum, the term was introduced mostly by Macedonian scholars and it is anachronistic because there was no separate Macedonian language, distinguished from early Bulgarian, in the 9th century. The obsolete term Old Slovenian was used by early 19th-century scholars who conjectured that the language was based on the dialect of Pannonia.

=== Modern Slavic nomenclature ===
The names for the language in the modern Slavic languages are the following:

- Belarusian: стараславянская мова (staraslavjanskaja mova), 'Old Slavic language'
- Bosnian and Croatian: staroslavenski, 'Old Slavic'
- Bulgarian: старобългарски (starobӑlgarski), 'Old Bulgarian' and старославянски, (staroslavjanski), 'Old Slavic'
- Czech: staroslověnština, 'Old Slavic'
- Macedonian: старословенски (staroslovenski), 'Old Slavic'
- Polish: staro-cerkiewno-słowiański, 'Old Church Slavic'
- Russian: старославянский язык (staroslavjanskij jazyk), 'Old Slavic language'
- Rusyn (Carpathian): старославяньскый язык (staroslavjan'skyj jazyk), 'Old Slavic language'
- Rusyn (Pannonian): старославянски язик (staroslavjanski jazik), 'Old Slavic language'
- Serbian: старословенски, romanized: staroslovenski, 'Old Slavic', 'Old Slavic'
- Slovak: staroslovienčina
- Slovene: stara cerkvena slovanščina, 'Old Church Slavic'
- Ukrainian: старослов'янська мова (staroslov"jans'ka mova), 'Old Slavic language'

== History ==
It is generally held that the language was standardized by two Byzantine missionaries, Cyril and his brother Methodius, for a mission to Great Moravia (the territory of today's eastern Czech Republic and western Slovakia; for details, see Glagolitic alphabet). The mission took place in response to a request by Great Moravia's ruler, Duke Rastislav for the development of Slavonic liturgy.

As part of preparations for the mission, in 862/863, the missionaries developed the Glagolitic alphabet and translated the most important prayers and liturgical books, including the Aprakos Evangeliar, the Psalter, and the Acts of the Apostles, allegedly basing the language on the Slavic dialect spoken in the hinterland of their hometown, Thessaloniki, (Note: Slavs had invaded the region from about 550 CE.) in present-day Greece.

Based on a number of archaicisms preserved until the early 20th century (the articulation of yat as /æ/ in Boboshticë, Drenovë, around Thessaloniki, Razlog, the Rhodopes and Thrace and of yery as /ɨ/ around Castoria and the Rhodopes, the presence of decomposed nasalisms around Castoria and Thessaloniki, etc.), the dialect is posited to have been part of a macrodialect extending from the Adriatic to the Black Sea, and covering southern Albania, northern Greece and the southernmost parts of Bulgaria.

Because of the very short time between Rastislav's request and the actual mission, it has been widely suggested that both the Glagolitic alphabet and the translations had been "in the works" for some time, probably for a planned mission to Bulgaria.

The language and the Glagolitic alphabet, as taught at the Great Moravian Academy (Slovak: Veľkomoravské učilište), were used for government and religious documents and books in Great Moravia between 863 and 885. The texts written during this phase contain characteristics of the West Slavic vernaculars in Great Moravia.

In 885, Pope Stephen V prohibited the use of Old Church Slavonic in Great Moravia in favour of Latin. King Svatopluk I of Great Moravia expelled the Byzantine missionary contingent in 886.

Exiled students of the two apostles then brought the Glagolitic alphabet to the Bulgarian Empire, being at least some of them Bulgarians themselves. Boris I of Bulgaria (r. 852–889) received and officially accepted them; he established the Preslav Literary School and the Ohrid Literary School. Both schools originally used the Glagolitic alphabet, though the Cyrillic script developed early on at the Preslav Literary School, where it superseded Glagolitic as official in Bulgaria in 893.

The texts written during this era exhibit certain linguistic features of the vernaculars of the First Bulgarian Empire. Old Church Slavonic spread to other South-Eastern, Central, and Eastern European Slavic territories, most notably Croatia, Serbia, Bohemia, Lesser Poland, and principalities of the Kievan Rus' – while retaining characteristically Eastern South Slavic linguistic features.

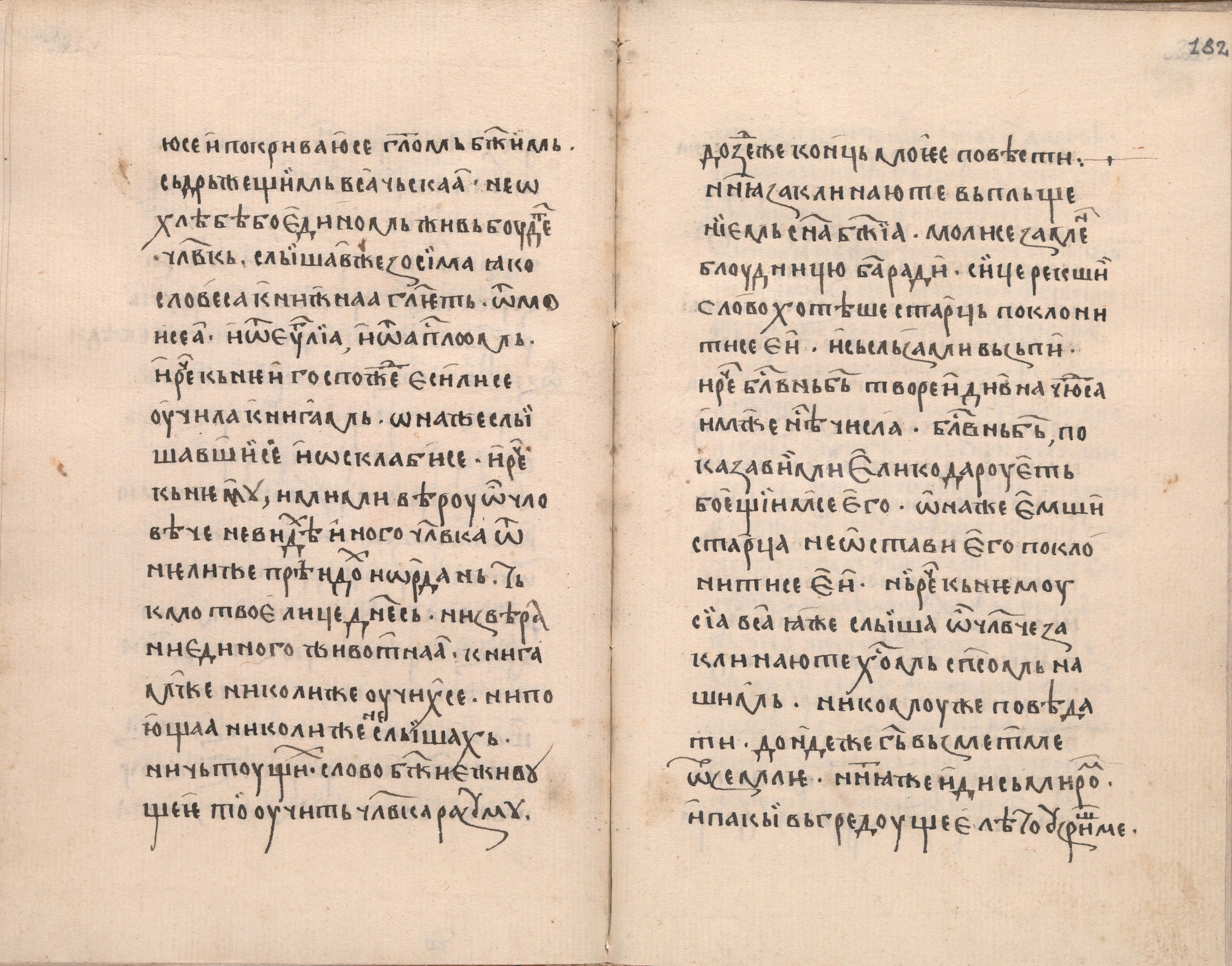
Example of the Cyrillic alphabet: excerpt from the manuscript Vidin Miscellany, written in Middle Bulgarian, 1360

Later texts written in each of those territories began to take on characteristics of the local Slavic vernaculars, and by the mid-11th century Old Church Slavonic had diversified into a number of regional varieties (known as recensions). These local varieties are collectively known as the Church Slavonic language.

Apart from use in the Slavic countries, Old Church Slavonic served as a liturgical language in the Romanian Orthodox Church, and also as a literary and official language of the princedoms of Wallachia and Moldavia (see Old Church Slavonic in Romania), before gradually being replaced by Romanian during the 16th to 17th centuries.

Church Slavonic maintained a prestigious status, particularly in Russia, for many centuries – among Slavs in the East it had a status analogous to that of Latin in Western Europe, but had the advantage of being substantially less divergent from the vernacular tongues of average parishioners.

Some Orthodox churches, such as the Bulgarian Orthodox Church, Russian Orthodox Church, Serbian Orthodox Church, Ukrainian Orthodox Church and Macedonian Orthodox Church – Ohrid Archbishopric, as well as several Eastern Catholic Churches, still use Church Slavonic in their services and chants.

== Scripts ==
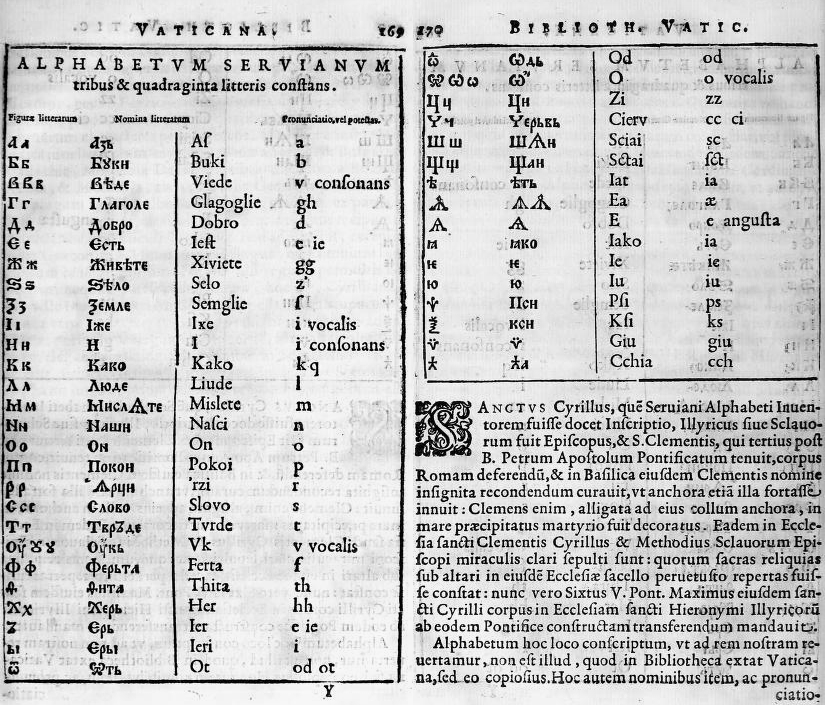
Serbian Cyrillic alphabet variant by Biblioteca Apostolica Vaticana, attributed to Saint Cyril and Methodius, 16th century

Initially Old Church Slavonic was written with the Glagolitic alphabet, but later Glagolitic was replaced by Cyrillic, which was developed in the First Bulgarian Empire by a decree of Boris I of Bulgaria in the 9th century. Of the Old Church Slavonic canon, about two-thirds is written in Glagolitic.

The local Serbian Cyrillic alphabet was preserved in Serbia, Bosnia and parts of Croatia, while a variant of the angular Glagolitic alphabet was preserved in Croatia. See Early Cyrillic alphabet for a detailed description of the script and information about the sounds it originally expressed.

== Phonology ==
For Old Church Slavonic, the following segments are reconstructible. A few sounds are given in Slavic transliterated form rather than in IPA, as the exact realisation is uncertain and often differs depending on the area that a text originated from.

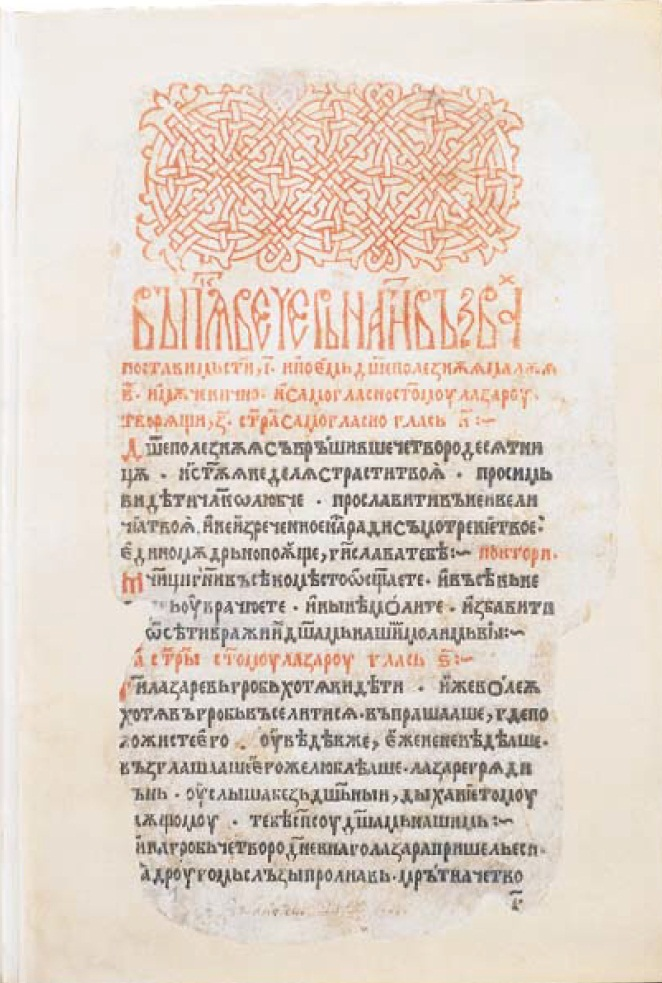
A page from the Flowery Triodion (Triod' cvetnaja), a Polish book printed in Kraków in about 1491, one of the oldest printed Byzantine-Slavonic books, National Library of Poland

=== Consonants ===
For English equivalents and narrow transcriptions of sounds, see Help:IPA/Old Church Slavonic.

		Labial	Dental	Palatal	Velar
Nasal		m	n	ɲ^{c}	
Plosive	voiceless	p	t	tʲ^{a}	k
Plosive	voiced	b	d	dʲ^{a}	ɡ
Affricate	voiceless		t͡s^{d}	t͡ʃ	
Affricate	voiced		d͡z^{b}^{d}		
Fricative	voiceless		s, sʲ^{e}	ʃ	x
Fricative	voiced		z	ʒ	
Lateral			l	ʎ^{c}	
Trill			r	rʲ^{c}	
Approximant		v		j	

- ^a These phonemes were written and articulated differently in different recensions: as ⟨Ⱌ⟩ (/t͡s/) and ⟨Ⰷ⟩ (/d͡z/) in the Moravian recension, ⟨Ⱌ⟩ (/t͡s/) and ⟨Ⰸ⟩ (/z/) in the Bohemian recension, ⟨Ⱋ⟩/⟨щ⟩ (also spelled ⟨ⰞⰕ⟩/⟨шт⟩, [ʃt⁽ʲ⁾]) and ⟨ⰆⰄ⟩/⟨жд⟩ ([ʒd⁽ʲ⁾]) in the Bulgarian recension(s). In Serbia, ⟨Ꙉ⟩ was used to denote both sounds. The abundance of Middle Ages toponyms featuring [ʃt] and [ʒd] in North Macedonia, Kosovo and the Torlak-speaking parts of Serbia indicates that at the time, the clusters were articulated as [ʃt] & [ʒd] as well, even though current reflexes are different.
- ^b /dz/ appears mostly in early texts, becoming /z/ later on.
- ^cThe distinction between alveolar /l/, /n/, and /r/ and palatal /ʎ/, /ɲ/, and /rʲ/ is not always indicated in writing. When it is, it is shown by a palatalization diacritic over the letter: ⟨ л҄ ⟩ ⟨ н҄ ⟩ ⟨ р҄ ⟩. Also, palatalization could be indicated by using iotified vowel letters (⟨ ꙗ, ѥ, ю, ѩ, ѭ ⟩) after consonants: ⟨ вол҄а ⟩=⟨ волꙗ ⟩ 'will (n.), freedom'.

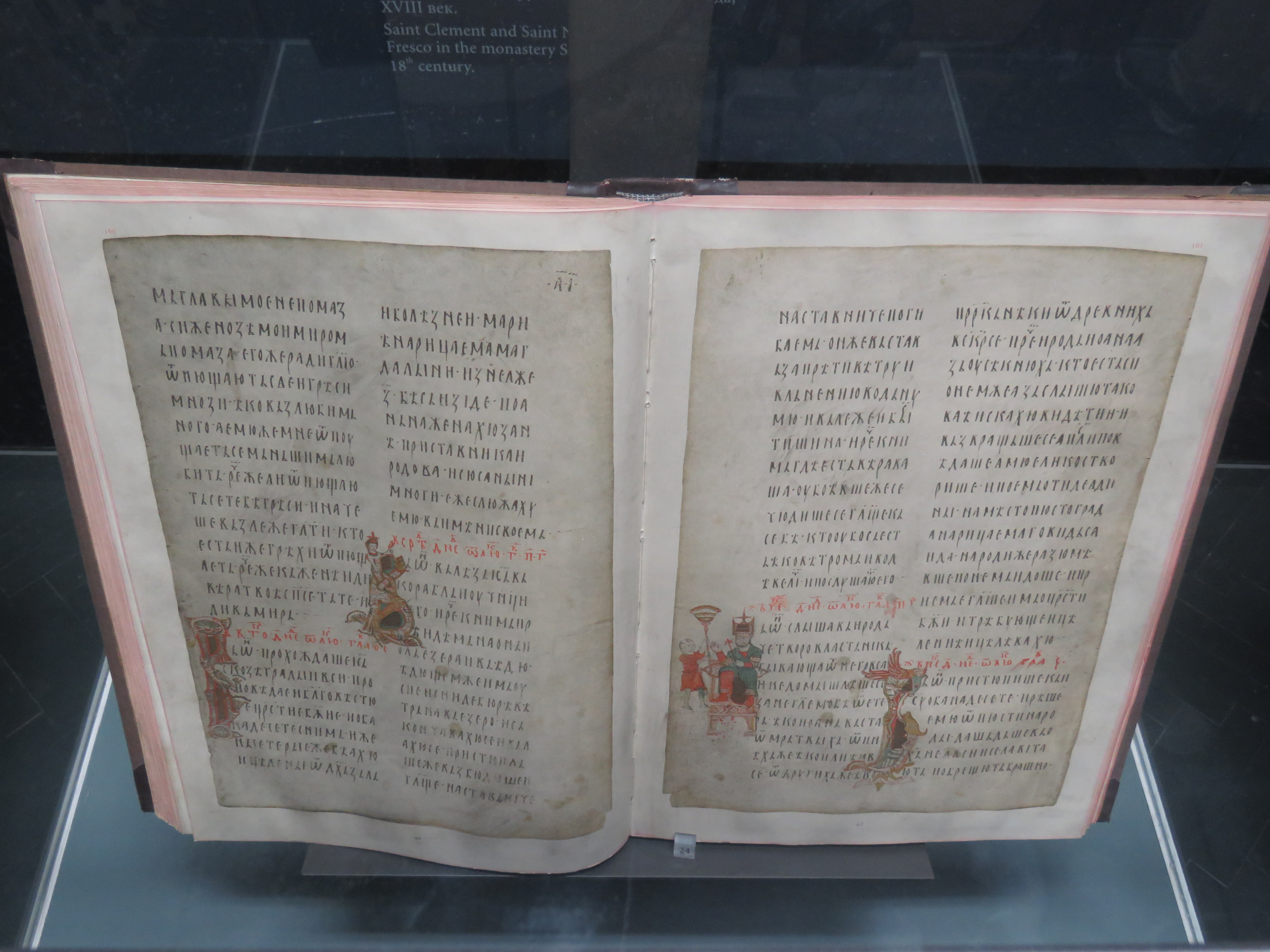
A page from the Gospel of Miroslav, Serbian medieval manuscript, a 12th-century Byzantine-Slavonic book, National Library of Serbia

- ^{d} /ts/ and /dz/ are thought to have been originally pronounced as palatalized consonants: [tsʲ], [dzʲ], as evident from following vowels (ъ>ь, o>e) and from occasional use of ⟨ ꙗ ⟩ after ⟨ ꙃ ⟩ in inscriptions.
- ^{e} The sound [sʲ], which came from the second and progressive palatalizations of Proto-Slavic /x/, was usually not distinguished in writing from [s], but its existence is inferred from spellings such as ⟨ вьсꙗкъ ⟩ (also spelled ⟨ вьсакъ ⟩ and ⟨ вьсѣкъ ⟩) 'any(one), every(one)'.

=== Vowels ===
For English equivalents and narrow transcriptions of sounds, see Old Church Slavonic Pronunciation on Wiktionary.

Oral vowels
		Front	Back	
		Front	Unrounded	Rounded
Close	Tense	i /i/, /ji/^{a}, /jɪ/^{b}, ь/ĭ /i/^{c}	y /ɯ/^{d}	u /u/
Close	Lax	ь/ĭ /ɪ/^{e}	ъ/ŭ /ʊ/^{e}	
Open	Lax	e /ɛ/, /jɛ/^{a}		o /ɔ/
Open	Tense	ě /æ/^{f}, /jæ/^{a}	a /ɑ/^{g}, /(j)ɑ^{a}~(j)æ/^{g}	

Nasal vowels
Front	Back
ę /ɛ̃/^{h}	ǫ /ɔ̃/^{h} /(j)ɔ̃/^{a}

- ^a All front vowels were iotated word-initially and succeeding other vowels. The same sometimes applied for *a and *ǫ. In the Bulgarian region, an epenthetic *v was inserted before *ǫ in the place of iotation.
- ^b The distinction between /i/, /ji/, and /jɪ/ is rarely indicated in writing and must be inferred from reconstructions of Proto-Slavic. In Glagolitic, the three are written as ⟨ⰻ⟩, ⟨ⰹ⟩, and ⟨ⰺ⟩ respectively. In Cyrillic, /jɪ/ may sometimes be written as ⟨ꙇ⟩, and /ji/ as ⟨ї⟩, although this is rarely the case.
- ^c Yers preceding *j became tense, this was inconsistently reflected in writing in the case of *ь (ex: чаꙗньѥ or чаꙗние, both pronounced [t͡ʃɑjɑn̪ije]), but never with *ъ (which was always written as a yery).
- ^d Yery was the descendant of Proto-Balto-Slavic long *ū and was a high back unrounded vowel. Tense *ъ merged with *y, which gave rise to yery's spelling as ⟨ъи⟩ (later ⟨ꙑ⟩, modern ⟨ы⟩).
- ^e The yer vowels ь and ъ (ĭ and ŭ) are often called "ultrashort" and were lower, more centralised and shorter than their tense counterparts *i and *y. Both yers had a strong and a weak variant, with a yer always being strong if the next vowel is another yer. Weak yers disappeared in most positions in the word, already sporadically in the earliest texts but more frequently later on. Strong yers, on the other hand, merged with other vowels, particularly ĭ with e and ŭ with o, but differently in different areas.
- ^f The pronunciation of yat (ѣ/ě) differed by area. In Bulgaria it was a relatively open vowel, commonly reconstructed as /æ/, but further north its pronunciation was more closed and it eventually became a diphthong /je/ (e.g. in modern standard Bosnian, Croatian, and Montenegrin, or modern standard Serbian spoken in Bosnia and Herzegovina, as well as in Czech — the source of the grapheme ě) or even /i/ in many areas (e.g. in Chakavian Croatian, Shtokavian Ikavian Croatian, and Bosnian dialects or Ukrainian) or /e/ (modern standard Serbian spoken in Serbia).
- ^g *a was the descendant of Proto-Slavic long *o and was a low back unrounded vowel. Its iotated variant was often confused with *ě (in Glagolitic they are even the same letter: Ⱑ), so *a was probably fronted to *ě when it followed palatal consonants (this is still the case in Rhodopean dialects).
- ^h The exact articulation of the nasal vowels is unclear because different areas tend to merge them with different vowels. ę /ɛ̃/ is occasionally seen to merge with e or ě in South Slavic, but becomes ja early on in East Slavic. ǫ /ɔ̃/ generally merges with u or o, but in Bulgaria, ǫ was apparently unrounded and eventually merged with ъ.

=== Accent and quantity ===
Old Church Slavonic texts, with the possible exception of the Kiev Missal, did not mark any accents or quantitative characteristics of the vowels. It is however likely that OCS at least partly inherited the Proto-Slavic system of vowel lengths and mobile pitch accent.

Clitics, such as prepositions and short pronoun forms (e.g. Dsg. mi as opposed to long mьně 'me'), lacked their own accent and instead formed an accentual unit with the word they were bound to.

=== Phonotactics ===
Several notable constraints on the distribution of the phonemes can be identified, mostly resulting from the tendencies occurring within the Common Slavic period, such as intrasyllabic synharmony and the law of open syllables. For consonant and vowel clusters and sequences of a consonant and a vowel, the following constraints can be ascertained:

- Two adjacent consonants tend not to share identical features of manner of articulation
- No syllable ends in a consonant
- Every obstruent agrees in voicing with the following obstruent
- Velars do not occur before front vowels
- Phonetically palatalized consonants do not occur before certain back vowels
- The back vowels /ɯ/ (⟨y⟩) and /ъ/ as well as front vowels other than /i/ do not occur word-initially: the two back vowels take prothetic /v/ and the front vowels prothetic /j/. Initial /a/ may take either prothetic consonant or none at all.
- Vowel sequences are attested in only one lexeme (paǫčina 'spider's web') and in the suffixes /aa/ and /ěa/ of the imperfect
- At morpheme boundaries, the following vowel sequences occur: /ai/, /au/, /ao/, /oi/, /ou/, /oo/, /ěi/, /ěo/

=== Morphophonemic alternations ===
As a result of the first and the second Slavic palatalizations, velars alternate with dentals and palatals. In addition, as a result of a process usually termed iotation (or iodization), velars and dentals alternate with palatals in various inflected forms and in word formation.

Alternations in velar consonants
original	/k/	/g/	/x/	/sk/	/zg/	/sx/
first palatalization and iotation	/č/	/ž/	/š/	/št/	/žd/	/š/
second palatalization	/c/	/dz/	/s/	/sc/, /st/	/zd/	/sc/

Alternations in other consonants
original	/b/	/zb/	/p/	/sp/	/d/	/zd/	/t/	/st/	/z/	/s/	/l/	/sl/	/zl/	/m/	/n/	/sn/	/zn/	/r/	/tr/	/dr/
iotation	/bl'/		/pl'/		/žd/	/žd/	/št/	/št/	/ž/	/š/	/l'/	/šl'/	/žl'/	/ml'/	/n'/	/šn'/	/žn'/	/r'/	/štr'/	/ždr'/

In some forms the alternations of /c/ with /č/ and of /dz/ with /ž/ occur, in which the corresponding velar is missing. The dental alternants of velars occur regularly before /ě/ and /i/ in the declension and in the imperative, and somewhat less regularly in various forms after /i/, /ę/, /ь/ and /r^{ь}/. The palatal alternants of velars occur before front vowels in all other environments, where dental alternants do not occur, as well as in various places in inflection and word formation described below.

As a result of earlier alternations between short and long vowels in roots in Proto-Indo-European, Proto-Balto-Slavic and Proto-Slavic times, and of the fronting of vowels after palatalized consonants, the following vowel alternations are attested in OCS: /ь/ : /i/; /ъ/ : /y/ : /u/; /e/ : /ě/ : /i/; /o/ : /a/; /o/ : /e/; /ě/ : /a/; /ъ/ : /ь/; /y/ : /i/; /ě/ : /i/; /y/ : /ę/.

Vowel:∅ alternations sometimes occurred as a result of sporadic loss of weak yer, which later occurred in almost all Slavic dialects. The phonetic value of the corresponding vocalized strong jer is dialect-specific.

== Grammar ==
As an ancient Indo-European language, OCS has a highly inflective morphology. Inflected forms are divided in two groups, nominals and verbs. Nominals are further divided into nouns, adjectives and pronouns. Numerals inflect either as nouns or pronouns, with 1–4 showing gender agreement as well.

Nominals can be declined in three grammatical genders (masculine, feminine, neuter), three numbers (singular, plural, dual) and seven cases: nominative, vocative, accusative, instrumental, dative, genitive, and locative. There are five basic inflectional classes for nouns: o/jo-stems, a/ja-stems, i-stems, u-stems, and consonant stems. Forms throughout the inflectional paradigm usually exhibit morphophonemic alternations.

Fronting of vowels after palatals and j yielded dual inflectional class o : jo and a : ja, whereas palatalizations affected stem as a synchronic process (N sg. vlьkъ, V sg. vlьče; L sg. vlьcě). Productive classes are o/jo-, a/ja-, and i-stems. Sample paradigms are given in the table below:

Sample declensional classes for nouns
		Singular							Dual			Plural					
Gloss	Stem type	Nom	Voc	Acc	Gen	Loc	Dat	Instr	Nom/Voc/Acc	Gen/Loc	Dat/Instr	Nom/Voc	Acc	Gen	Loc	Dat	Instr
"city"	o m.	gradъ	grade	gradъ	grada	gradě	gradu	gradomь	grada	gradu	gradoma	gradi	grady	gradъ	graděxъ	gradomъ	grady
"knife"	jo m.	nožь	nožu	nožь	noža	noži	nožu	nožemь	noža	nožu	nožema	noži	nožę	nožь	nožixъ	nožemъ	noži
"wolf"	o m	vlьkъ	vlьče	vlьkъ	vlьka	vlьcě	vlьku	vlьkomь	vlьka	vlьku	vlьkoma	vlьci	vlьky	vlьkъ	vlьcěxъ	vlьkomъ	vlьky
"wine"	o n.	vino	vino	vino	vina	vině	vinu	vinomь	vině	vinu	vinoma	vina	vina	vinъ	viněxъ	vinomъ	viny
"field"	jo n.	poʎe	poʎe	poʎe	poʎa	poʎi	poʎu	poʎemь	poʎi	poʎu	poʎema	poʎa	poʎa	poʎь	poʎixъ	poʎemъ	poʎi
"woman"	a f.	žena	ženo	ženǫ	ženy	ženě	ženě	ženojǫ	ženě	ženu	ženama	ženy	ženy	ženъ	ženaxъ	ženamъ	ženami
"soul"	ja f.	duša	duše	dušǫ	dušę	duši	duši	dušejǫ	duši	dušu	dušama	dušę	dušę	dušь	dušaxъ	dušamъ	dušami
"hand"	a f.	rǫka	rǫko	rǫkǫ	rǫky	rǫcě	rǫcě	rǫkojǫ	rǫcě	rǫku	rǫkama	rǫky	rǫky	rǫkъ	rǫkaxъ	rǫkamъ	rǫkami
"bone"	i f.	kostь	kosti	kostь	kosti	kosti	kosti	kostьjǫ	kosti	kostьju	kostьma	kosti	kosti	kostьjь	kostьxъ	kostьmъ	kostьmi
"home"	u m.	domъ	domu	domъ/-a	domu	domu	domovi	domъmь	domy	domovu	domъma	domove	domy	domovъ	domъxъ	domъmъ	domъmi

Adjectives are inflected as o/jo-stems (masculine and neuter) and a/ja-stems (feminine), in three genders. They could have short (indefinite) or long (definite) variants, the latter being formed by suffixing to the indefinite form the anaphoric third-person pronoun jь.

Synthetic verbal conjugation is expressed in present, aorist and imperfect tenses while perfect, pluperfect, future and conditional tenses/moods are made by combining auxiliary verbs with participles or synthetic tense forms. Sample conjugation for the verb vesti "to lead" (underlyingly ved-ti) is given in the table below.

Sample conjugation of the verb vesti "to lead"
person/number	Present	Asigmatic (simple, root) aorist	Sigmatic (s-) aorist	New (ox) aorist	Imperfect	Imperative
1 sg.	vedǫ	vedъ	věsъ	vedoxъ	veděaxъ	
2 sg.	vedeši	vede	vede	vede	veděaše	vedi
3 sg.	vedetъ	vede	vede	vede	veděaše	vedi
1 dual	vedevě	vedově	věsově	vedoxově	veděaxově	veděvě
2 dual	vedeta	vedeta	věsta	vedosta	veděašeta	veděta
3 dual	vedete	vedete	věste	vedoste	veděašete	
1 plural	vedemъ	vedomъ	věsomъ	vedoxomъ	veděaxomъ	veděmъ
2 plural	vedete	vedete	věste	vedoste	veděašete	veděte
3 plural	vedǫtъ	vedǫ	věsę	vedošę	veděaxǫ	

== Basis ==
Written evidence of Old Church Slavonic survives in a relatively small body of manuscripts, most of them written in the First Bulgarian Empire during the late 10th and the early 11th centuries. The language has an Eastern South Slavic basis in the Bulgarian-Macedonian dialectal area, with an admixture of Western Slavic (Moravian) features inherited during the mission of Saints Cyril and Methodius to Great Moravia (863–885).

The only well-preserved manuscript of the Moravian recension, the Kiev Missal, or the Kiev Folia, is characterised by the replacement of some South Slavic phonetic and lexical features with Western Slavic ones. Manuscripts written in the First Bulgarian Empire have, on the other hand, few Western Slavic features.

Though South Slavic in phonology and morphology, Old Church Slavonic was influenced by Byzantine Greek in syntax and style, and is characterized by complex subordinate sentence structures and participial constructions.

A large body of complex, polymorphemic words was coined, first by Saint Cyril himself and then by his students at the academies in Great Moravia and the First Bulgarian Empire, to denote complex abstract and religious terms, e.g., ꙁълодѣꙗньѥ (zъlodějanьje) from ꙁъло ('evil') + дѣти ('do') + ньѥ (noun suffix), i.e., 'evil deed'. A significant part of them wеrе calqued directly from Greek.

Old Church Slavonic is valuable to historical linguists since it preserves archaic features believed to have once been common to all Slavic languages such as:

- Most significantly, the yer (extra-short) vowels: /ɪ̆/ and /ʊ̆/
- Nasal vowels: /ɛ̃/ and /ɔ̃/
- Near-open articulation of the yat vowel (/æ/)
- Palatal consonants /ɲ/ and /ʎ/ from Proto-Slavic *ň and *ľ
- Proto-Slavic declension system based on stem endings, including those that later disappeared in attested languages (such as u-stems)
- Dual as a distinct grammatical number from singular and plural
- Aorist, imperfect, Proto-Slavic paradigms for participles

The South Slavic and Eastern South Slavic nature of the language is evident from the following variations:

- Phonetic:
  - ra, la by means of liquid metathesis of Proto-Slavic *or, *ol clusters
  - sě from Proto-Slavic *xě < *xai
  - cv, (d)zv from Proto-Slavic *kvě, *gvě < *kvai, *gvai
- Morphological:
  - Morphosyntactic use of the dative possessive case in personal pronouns and nouns: братъ ми (bratŭ mi, "my brother"), рѫка ти (rǫka ti, "your hand"), отъпоущенье грѣхомъ (otŭpuštenĭje grěxomŭ, "remission of sins"), храмъ молитвѣ (xramŭ molitvě, 'house of prayer'), etc.
  - periphrastic future tense using the verb хотѣти (xotěti, "to want"), for example, хоштѫ писати (xoštǫ pisati, "I will write")
  - Use of the comparative form мьнии (mĭniji, "smaller") to denote "younger"
  - Morphosyntactic use of suffixed demonstrative pronouns тъ, та, то (tъ, ta, to). In Bulgarian and Macedonian, these developed into suffixed definite articles and also took the place of the third person singular and plural pronouns онъ, она, оно, они (onъ, ona, ono, oni) > той/тоj, тя/таа, то/тоа, те/тие ('he, she, it, they')

Old Church Slavonic also shares the following phonetic features only with Bulgarian:

- Near-open articulation *æ / *jæ of the Yat vowel (ě); still preserved in the Bulgarian dialects of the Rhodope mountains, the Razlog dialect, the Shumen dialect and partially preserved as *ja (ʲa) across Yakavian Eastern Bulgarian
- /ʃt/ and /ʒd/ as reflexes of Proto-Slavic *ťʲ (< *tj and *gt, *kt) and *ďʲ (< *dj).

Reflexes of Proto-Slavic *dj and *tj/*gti/*kti in Old Church Slavonic (OCS) and modern Slavic languages
Proto-Slavic	Old Church Slavonic	Bulgarian	Macedonian	Serbo-Croatian	Slovenian	Slovak	Czech	Polish	Russian^{1}
*dʲ medja ('boundary')	жд ([ʒd])	жд ([ʒd])	ѓ (/ʄ/)	đ (/d͡ʑ/)	j (/j/)	dz (/d͡z/)	z (/z/)	dz (/d͡z/)	ж (/ʐ/)
*dʲ medja ('boundary')	межда	межда	меѓа	međa	meja	medza	mez	miedza	межа
*tʲ světja ('candle')	щ ([ʃt])	щ ([ʃt])	ќ (/c/)	ć (/t͡ɕ/)	č (/t͡ʃ/)	c (/t͡s/)	c (/t͡s/)	c (/t͡s/)	ч (/t͡ɕ/)
*tʲ světja ('candle')	свѣща	свещ	свеќа	sv(ij)eća	sveča	svieca	svíce	świeca	свеча

^1 With the exception of some Ukrainian and Belarusian reflexes of *dj as дж /d͡ʐ/, both Belarusian and Ukrainian mirror the development in Russian and feature ж (/ʐ/) and ч (/t͡ʂ/).

== Local influences (recensions) ==
Over time, the language adopted more and more features from local Slavic vernaculars, producing different variants referred to as recensions or redactions. Modern convention differentiates between the earliest, classical form of the language, referred to as Old Church Slavonic, and later, vernacular-coloured forms, collectively designated as Church Slavonic. More specifically, Old Church Slavonic is exemplified by extant manuscripts written between the 9th and 11th century in Great Moravia and the First Bulgarian Empire.

=== Great Moravia ===
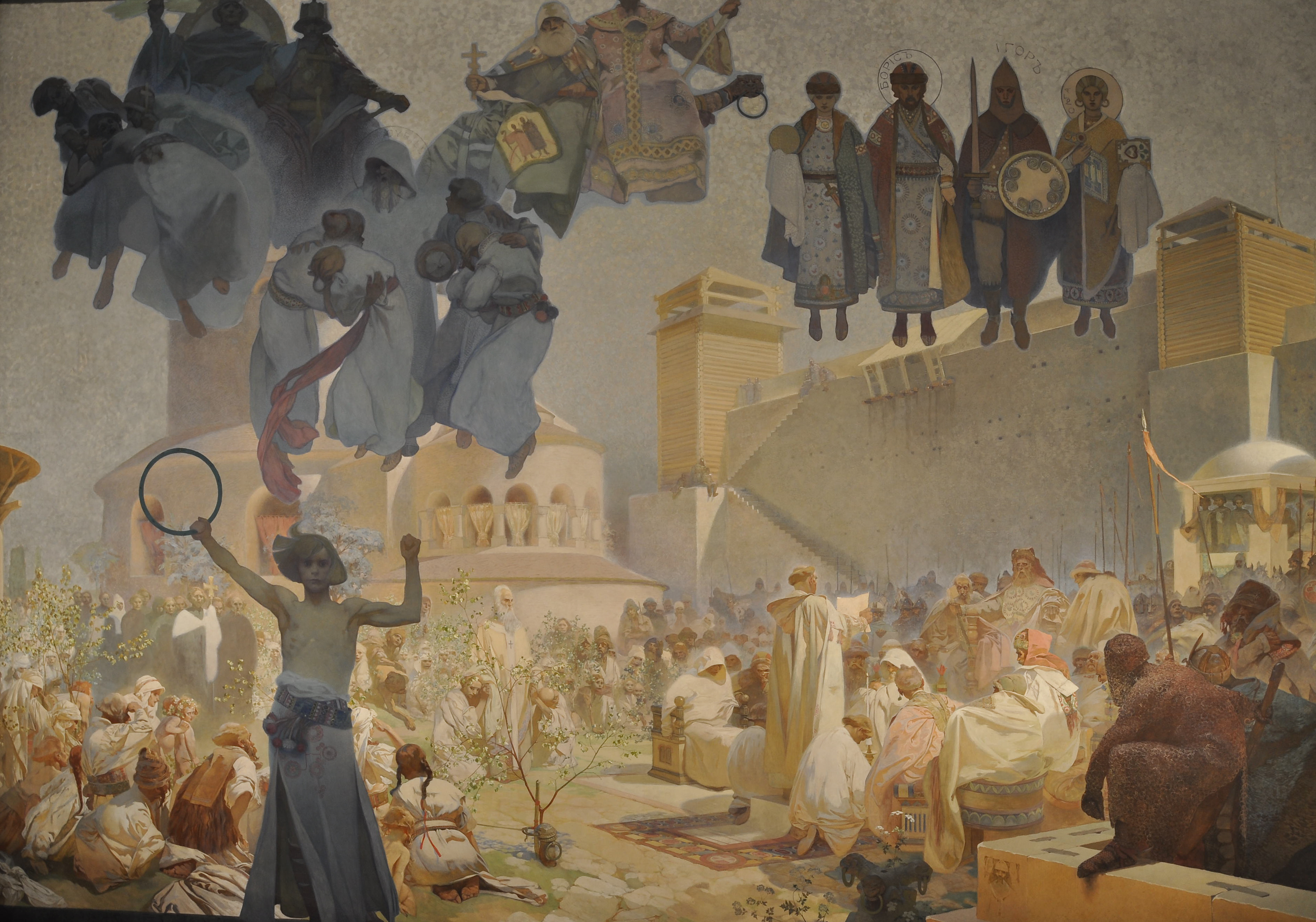
The Introduction of the Slavonic Liturgy in Great Moravia (1912), by Alphonse Mucha, The Slav Epic

The language was standardized for the first time by the mission of the two apostles to Great Moravia from 863. The manuscripts of the Moravian recension are therefore the earliest dated of the OCS recensions. The recension takes its name from the Slavic state of Great Moravia which existed in Central Europe during the 9th century on the territory of today's Czech Republic, Slovakia, Hungary, northern Austria and southeastern Poland.

==== Moravian recension ====
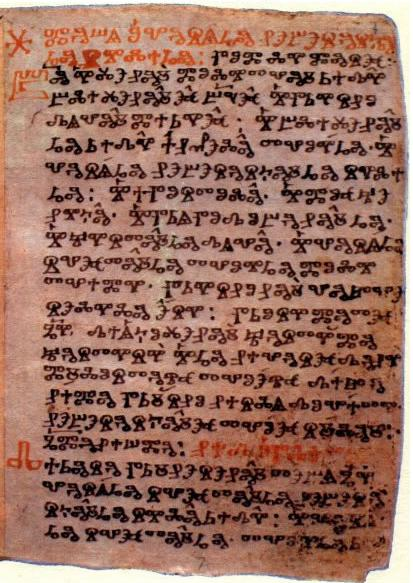
Folio 7 of the 10th-century Glagolitic Kiev Missal, written in the Moravian recension

This recension is exemplified by the Kiev Missal. Its linguistic characteristics include:

- Confusion between the letters Big yus ⟨Ѫѫ⟩ and Uk ⟨Ѹѹ⟩ – this occurs once in the Kiev Folia, when the expected form въсоудъ vъsudъ is spelled въсѫдъ vъsǫdъ
- /ts/ from Proto-Slavic *tj, use of /dz/ from *dj, /ʃtʃ/ *skj
- Use of the words mьša, cirky, papežь, prěfacija, klepati, piskati etc.
- Preservation of the consonant cluster /dl/ (e.g. modlitvami)
- Use of the ending –ъmь instead of –omь in the masculine singular instrumental, use of the pronoun čьso

=== First Bulgarian Empire ===
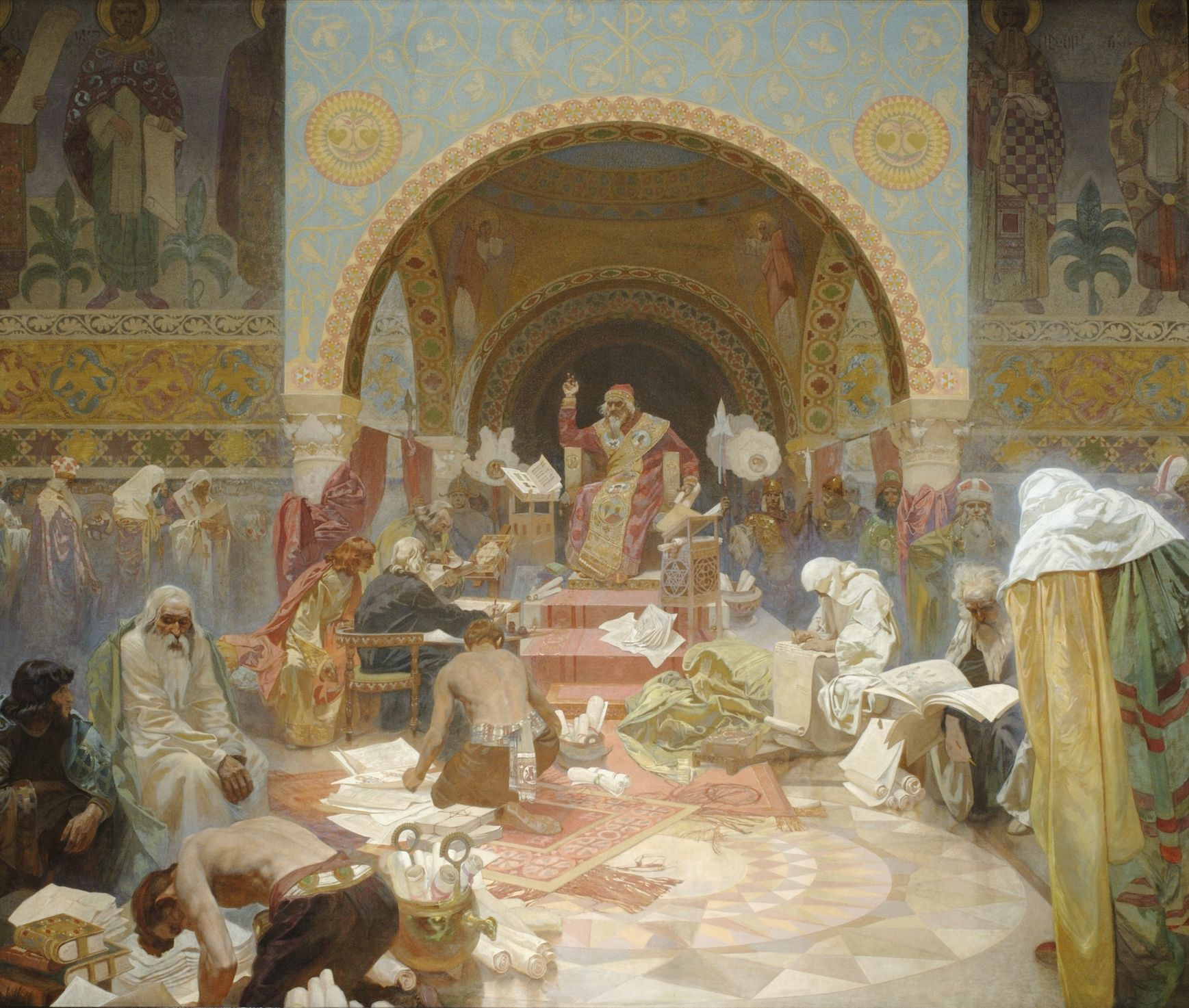
Simeon I of Bulgaria, the Morning Star of Slavonic Literature (1923), by Alphonse Mucha, The Slav Epic

Although the missionary work of Constantine and Methodius took place in Great Moravia, it was in the First Bulgarian Empire that early Slavic written culture and liturgical literature really flourished. The Old Church Slavonic language was adopted as state and liturgical language in 893, and was taught and refined further in two bespoke academies created in Preslav (Bulgarian capital between 893 and 972), and Ohrid (Bulgarian capital between 991/997 and 1015).

The language did not represent one regional dialect but a generalized form of early eastern South Slavic, which cannot be localized. The existence of two major literary centres in the Empire led in the period from the 9th to the 11th centuries to the emergence of two recensions (otherwise called "redactions"), termed "Eastern" and "Western" respectively.

Some researchers do not differentiate between manuscripts of the two recensions, preferring to group them together in a "Macedo-Bulgarian" or simply "Bulgarian" recension. The development of Old Church Slavonic literacy had the effect of preventing the assimilation of the South Slavs into neighboring cultures, which promoted the formation of a distinct Bulgarian identity.

Common features of both recensions:

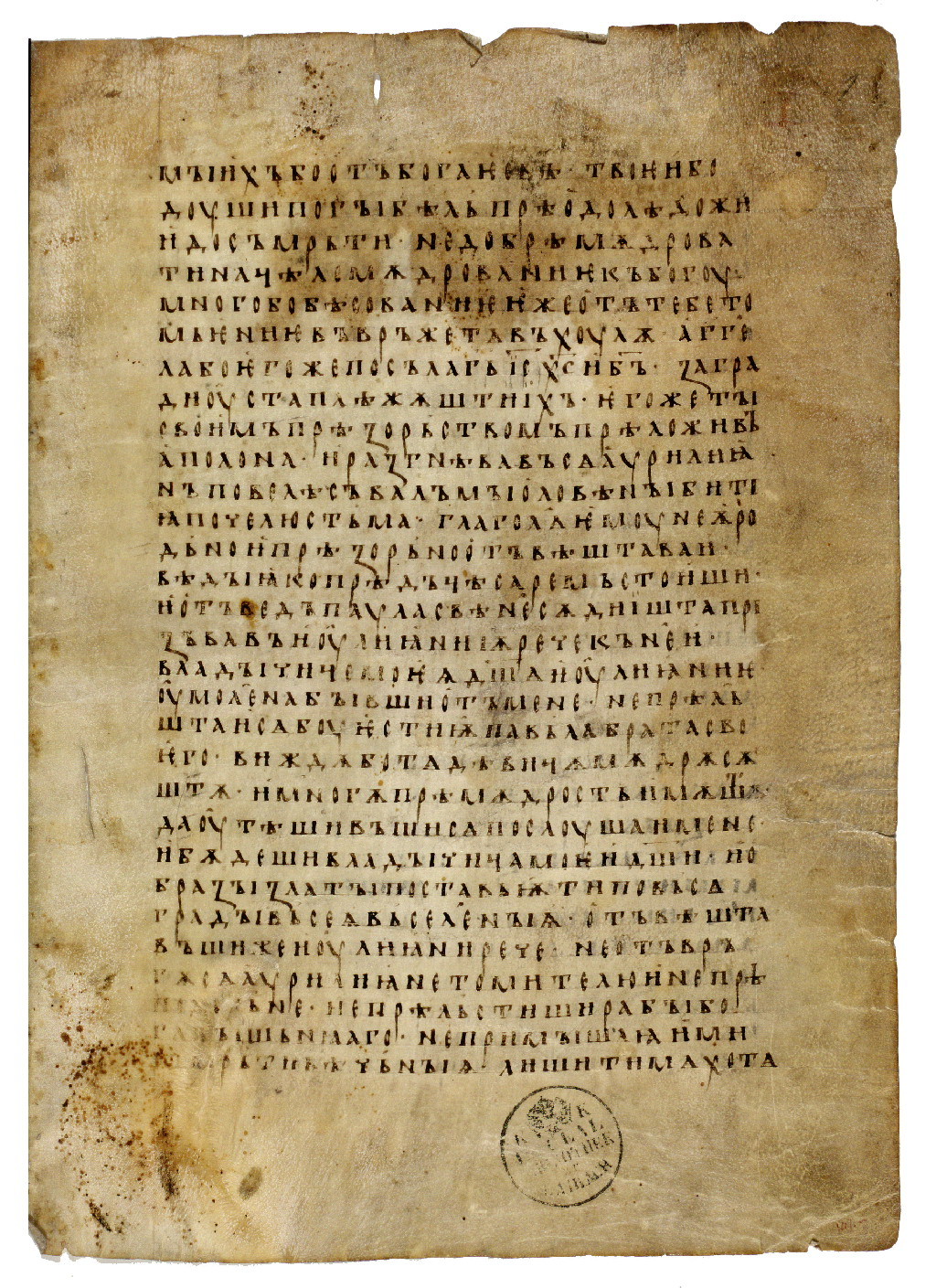
The Bulgarian Codex Suprasliensis is one of the earliest extant Cyrillic manuscripts, dating back to the mid-900s.

- Consistent use of the soft consonant clusters ⟨щ⟩ (*ʃt) & ⟨жд⟩ (*ʒd) for Proto-Slavic *tj/*gt/*kt and *dj. Articulation as *c & *ɟ in a number of Macedonian dialects is a later development due to Serbian influence in the Late Middle Ages, aided by Late Middle Bulgarian's mutation of palatal *t & *d > palatal k & g
- Consistent use of the yat vowel (ě)
- Inconsistent use of the epenthetic l, with attested forms both with and without it: korabĺь & korabъ, zemĺě & zemьja, the latter possibly indicating a shift from <ĺ> to <j>. Modern Bulgarian/Macedonian lack epenthetic l
- Replacement of the affricate ⟨ꙃ⟩ (*d͡z) with the fricative ⟨ꙁ⟩ (*z), realized consistently in Cyrillic and partially in Glagolitic manuscripts
- Use of the past participle in perfect and past perfect tense without an auxiliary to denote the narator's attitude to what is happening

Moreover, consistent scribal errors indicate the following trends in the development of the recension(s) between the 9th and the 11th centuries:

- Loss of the yers (ъ & ь) in weak position and their vocalization in strong position, with diverging results in Preslav and Ohrid
- Depalatalization of ⟨ж⟩ (*ʒ), ⟨ш⟩ (*ʃ), ⟨ч⟩ (*t͡ʃ), ⟨ꙃ⟩ (*d͡z), ⟨ц⟩ (*t͡s), and the ⟨щ⟩ & ⟨жд⟩ clusters. They are only hard in modern Bulgarian/Macedonian/Torlak
- Loss of intervocalic /j/, followed by vowel assimilation and contraction: sěěhъ (denoting sějahъ) > sěahъ > sěhъ ('I sowed'), dobrajego > dobraego > dobraago > dobrago ('good', masc. gen. sing.)
- Incipient denasalization of the small yus, ѧ (ę), replaced with є (e)
- Loss of the present tense third person sing. ending -тъ (tъ), e.g., бѫдетъ (bǫdetъ) > бѫде (bǫde) (lacking in modern Bulgarian/Macedonian/Torlak)
- Incipient replacement of the sigmatic and asigmatic aorist with the new aorist, e.g., vedoxъ instead of vedъ or věsъ (modern Bulgarian/Macedonian and, in part, Torlak use similar forms)
- Incipent analytisms, including examples of weakening of the noun declension, use of a postpositive definite article, infinitive decomposition > use of da constructions, future tense with хотѣти (> ще/ќе/че in Bulgarian/Macedonian/Torlak) can all be observed in 10-11th century manuscripts

There are also certain differences between the Preslav and Ohrid recensions. According to Huntley, the primary ones are the diverging development of the strong yers (Western: ъ > o (*ɔ) and ь > є (*ɛ), Eastern ъ and ь > *ə), and the palatalization of dentals and labials before front vowels in East but not West. These continue to be among the primary differences between Eastern Bulgarian and Western Bulgarian/Macedonian to this day. Moreover, two different styles (or redactions) can be distinguished at Preslav; Preslav Double-Yer (ъ ≠ ь) and Preslav Single-Yer (ъ = ь, usually > ь). The Preslav and Ohrid recensions are described in greater detail below:

==== Preslav recension ====
The manuscripts of the Preslav recension or "Eastern" variant are among the oldest of the Old Church Slavonic language, only predated by the Moravian recension. This recension was centred around the Preslav Literary School. Since the earliest datable Cyrillic inscriptions were found in the area of Preslav, it is this school which is credited with the development of the Cyrillic alphabet which gradually replaced the Glagolitic one. A number of prominent Bulgarian writers and scholars worked at the Preslav Literary School, including Naum of Preslav (until 893), Constantine of Preslav, John Exarch, Chernorizets Hrabar, etc.. The main linguistic features of this recension are the following:

- The Glagolitic and Cyrillic alphabets were used concurrently
- In some documents, the original supershort vowels ъ and ь merged with one letter taking the place of the other
- The original ascending reflex (rь, lь) of syllabic /r/ and /l/ was sometimes metathesized to (ьr, ьl), or a combination of the two
- The central vowel ы (ꙑ) merged with ъи (ъj)
- Merger of ⟨ꙃ⟩ (*d͡z) and ⟨ꙁ⟩ (*z)
- The verb forms нарицаѭ, нарицаѥши (naricajǫ, naricaješi) were substituted or alternated with наричꙗѭ, наричꙗеши (naričjajǫ, naričjaješi)

==== Ohrid recension ====
The manuscripts of the Ohrid recension or "Western" variant are among the oldest of the Old Church Slavonic language, only predated by the Moravian recension. The recension is sometimes named Macedonian because its literary centre, Ohrid, lies in the historical region of Macedonia. At that period, Ohrid administratively formed part of the province of Kutmichevitsa in the First Bulgarian Empire until the Byzantine conquest. The main literary centre of this dialect was the Ohrid Literary School, whose most prominent member and most likely founder, was Saint Clement of Ohrid who was commissioned by Boris I of Bulgaria to teach and instruct the future clergy of the state in the Slavonic language. This recension is represented by the Codex Zographensis and Marianus, among others. The main linguistic features of this recension include:

- Continuous usage of the Glagolitic alphabet instead of Cyrillic
- Strict distinction in the articulation of the yers and their vocalisation in strong position (ъ > *ɔ and ь > *ɛ) or deletion in weak position
- Wider usage and retention of the phoneme *d͡z (which in most other Slavic languages has dеaffricated to *z)

== Later recensions ==
Old Church Slavonic may have reached Slovenia as early as Cyril and Methodius's Panonian mission in 868 and is exemplified by the late 10th century Freising fragments, written in the Latin script. Later, in the 10th century, Glagolitic liturgy was carried from Bohemia to Croatia, where it established a rich literary tradition. Old Church Slavonic in the Cyrillic script was in turn transmitted from Bulgaria to Serbia in the 10th century and to Kievan Rus' in connection with its adoption of Orthodox Christianity in 988.

The later use of Old Church Slavonic in these medieval Slavic polities resulted in a gradual adjustment of the language to the local vernacular, while still retaining a number of Eastern South Slavic, Moravian or Bulgarian features. In all cases, yuses denasalised so that only Old Church Slavonic, modern Polish and some isolated Bulgarian dialects retained the old Slavonic nasal vowels.

Five major recensions with such vernacular "accommodations" can be identified: the Czech-Moravian or Bohemian recension, which originated in the original mission in Great Moravia but became moribund as early as the late 1000s; (Middle) Bulgarian, which continued the literary tradition of the Preslav and Ohrid Literary Schools; Croatian, associated with the continued use of the Glagolitic alphabet; Serbian, known for at least four separate recensions; and Russian, which came to dominance in the 1800s.

Certain authors also talk about separate Bosnian and Ruthenian recensions, whereas the use of the Bulgarian Euthymian recension in Wallachia and Moldova from the late 1300s until the early 1700s is sometimes referred to as "Daco-Slavonic" or "Dacian" recension. All of these later versions of Old Church Slavonic are collectively referred to as Church Slavonic.

=== Bohemian (Czech-Moravian) recension ===
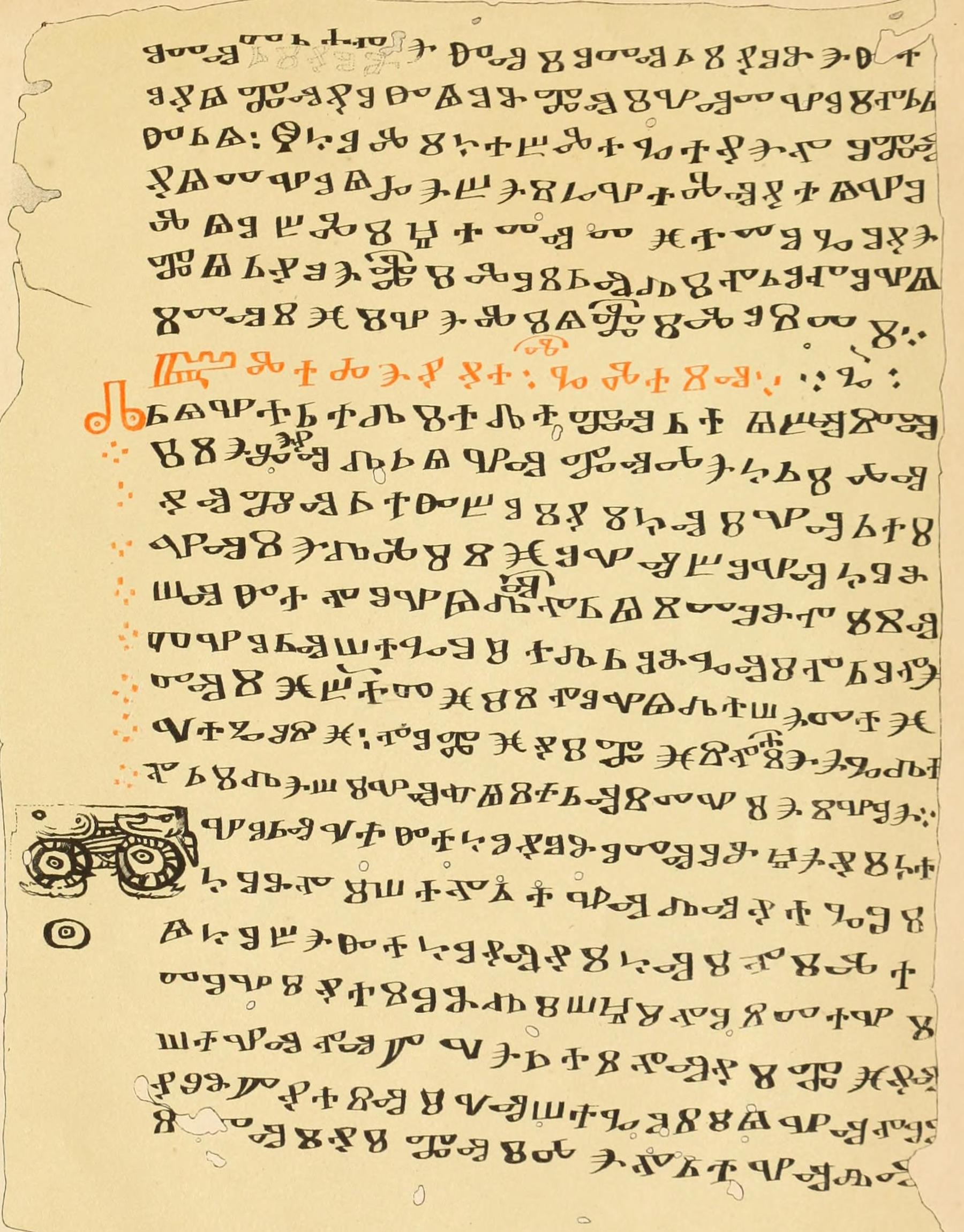
Prague Glagolitic Fragments

The Bohemian (Czech) recension is derived from the Moravian recension and was used in the Czech lands until 1097. It was written in Glagolitic, which is posited to have been carried over to Bohemia even before the death of Methodius. It is preserved in religious texts (e.g. Prague Fragments), legends and glosses and shows substantial influence of the Western Slavic vernacular in Bohemia at the time. Its main features are:

- PSl. *tj, *kt(i), *dj, *gt(i) → c /ts/, z: pomocь, utvrьzenie
- PSl. *stj, *skj → šč: *očistjenьje → očiščenie
- ending -ъmь in instr. sg. (instead of -omь): obrazъmь
- verbs with prefix vy- (instead of iz-)
- promoting of etymological -dl-, -tl- (světidlъna, vъsedli, inconsistently)
- suppressing of epenthetic l (prěstavenie, inconsistently)
- -š- in original stem vьx- (všěx) after 3rd palatalization
- development of yers and nasals coincident with development in Czech lands
- fully syllabic r and l
- ending -my in first-person pl. verbs
- missing terminal -tь in third-person present tense indicative
- creating future tense using prefix po-
- using words prosba (request), zagrada (garden), požadati (to ask for), potrěbovati (to need), conjunctions aby, nebo, etc.

=== Bosnian recension ===
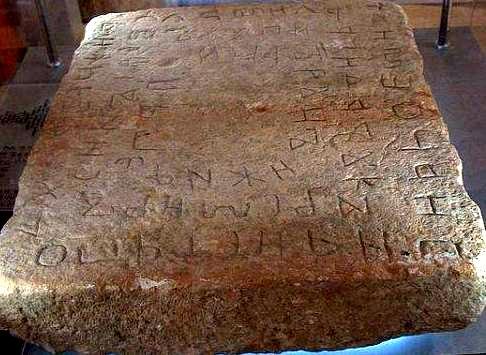
Humac tablet (between the 10th and end 12th century)

The Bosnian recension used both the Glagolitic alphabet and the Cyrillic alphabet. A home-grown version of the Cyrillic alphabet, commonly known as Bosančica, or Bosnian Cyrillic, coined as neologism in the 19th century, emerged very early on (probably the 1000s). Primary features:

- Use of the letters i, y, ě for *i in Bosnian manuscripts (reflecting Bosnian Ikavism)
- Use of the letter djerv (Ꙉꙉ) for the Serbo-Croatian reflexes of Proto-Slavic *tj and *dj (*t͡ɕ & *d͡ʑ)
- Djerv was also used denote palatal *l and *n: ⟨ꙉл⟩ = *ʎ, ⟨ꙉн⟩ = *ɲ
- Use of the letter Щщ for Proto-Slavic *stj, *skj (reflecting pronunciation as *ʃt or *ʃt͡ʃ) and only rarely for *tj

The recension has been subsumed under the Serbian recension, especially by Serbian linguistics, and (along with Bosančica) is the subject of a dispute between Serbs, Croatians and Bosniaks.

=== Middle Bulgarian ===
The common term "Middle Bulgarian" is usually contrasted to "Old Bulgarian" (an alternative name for Old Church Slavonic) and is loosely used for manuscripts whose language demonstrates a broad spectrum of regional and temporal dialect features after the 11th century. An alternative term, Bulgarian recension of Church Slavonic, is used by some authors.

Unlike the Old Bulgarian period, centres other than the capital of Tarnovo are only loosely defined, and designating individual recensions is difficult. Until St. Euthymius' reform, orthographies were not standardised, varying not only based on place and time―reflecting a language in phonetic and grammatical flux―but also by manuscript type and education and experience of the copyist. Lay works and manuscripts of less polished copyists, e.g., The Popular Vita of St. John of Rila of the late 1100s, the early 1200s Dobreyshovo Gospels or the early 1300s Troy Story exhibit far more and advanced analytical features than established canonical texts.

Middle Bulgarian is generally defined as a transition from the synthetic Old Bulgarian to the highly analytic New Bulgarian and Macedonian, where incipient 10th-century analytisms gradually spread from the north-east to all Bulgarian, Macedonian and Torlakian dialects. Primary features:

Phonological:

- Merger of the yuses, *ǫ=*ę (Ѫѫ=Ѧѧ), into a single mid back unrounded vowel (most likely ʌ̃), where ѫ was used after plain and ѧ after palatal consonants (1000s–1100s), followed by denasalization and transition of ѫ > *ɤ or *a and ѧ > *ɛ in most dialects (1200s-1300s)
- Str. *ě > *ja (ʲa) in Eastern Bulgarian, starting from the 1100s; вꙗнєцъ (vjanec) instead of вѣнєцъ (v(j)ænec), from earlier вѣньцъ (v(j)ænьc) ('wreath'), after vocalization of the strong front yer
- *ě > *e starting from northwestern Macedonia and spreading east and south, 1200s
- *cě > *ca & *dzě > *dza in eastern North Macedonia and western Bulgaria (yakavian at the time), цаловати (calovati) instead of цѣловати (c(j)ælovati) ('kiss'), indicating hardening of palatal *c & *dz before *ě, 1200s
- Merger of the yuses and yers (*ǫ=*ę=*ъ=*ь), usually, but not always, into a schwa-like sound (1200–1300s) in some dialects (central Bulgaria, the Rhodopes). Merger preserved in the most archaic Rup dialects, e.g., Smolyan (> ɒ), Paulician (incl. Banat Bulgarian), Zlatograd, Hvoyna (all > ɤ)

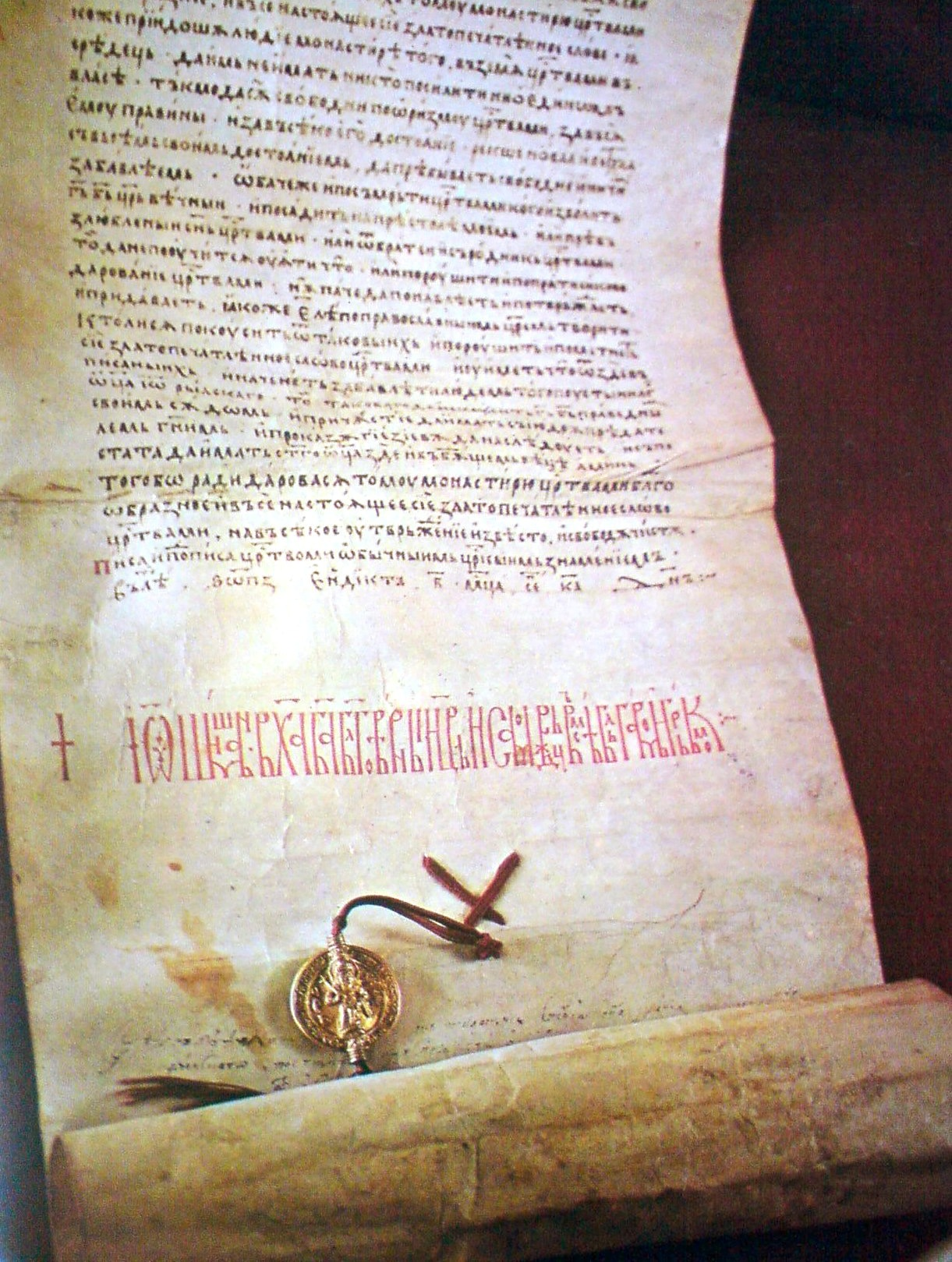
The 14th-century Rila Charter of Tsar Ivan Shishman is representative of Middle Bulgarian's development towards analytism.

Morphological:

- Degradation of the noun declension and incorrect use of most cases or their replacement of preposition + dative or accusative by the late 1300s
- Further development and grammaticalization of the short demonstrative pronouns into postpositive definite articles, e.g., сладостьтѫ ('the sweetness')
- Emergence of analytic comparative of adjectives, побогатъ ('richer'), подобръ ('better') by the 1300s
- Emergence of a single plural form for adjectives by the 1300s
- Disappearance of the supine, replaced by the infinitive, which in turn was replaced by da + present tense constructions by the late 1300s
- Disappearance of the present active, present passive and past active participle and the widening of the use of the l-participle (reklъ) and the past passive participle (rečenъ) ('said')
- Replacement of aorist plural forms -oxomъ, -oste, -ošę with -oxmy/oxme, -oxte, -oxǫ as early as the 1100s, e.g., рекохѫ (rekoxǫ) instead of рекошѧ (rekošę) ('they said')

Pre-Euthymian Tarnovo recension:

- Regular vocalisation ь > є (*ɛ) in both suffixes and roots, e.g., творєцъ (tvorecъ) ('creator'), лєвъ (levъ) ('lion') and notation with a back yer (ъ) if the root yer is weak―тъменъ (tъmenъ) ('dark, m. s.')
- Vocalisation ъ > o (*ɔ) in the suffixes -ъk-, -ъv- and definite articles: свитокъ (svitokъ) ('scroll'), любовъ (ʎubovъ) ('love'), родотъ (rodotъ) ('the kin')
- *y is written correctly in its etymological places
- *ž, *š, *žd and *št are followed by hard vowels (*ǫ, *u), signifying early depalatalisation
- *č, the old palatals *ɼ, *ʎ, *ɲ and the newly palatalised labials are followed by soft/iotated vowels (*ę, *ju) as an indication they are still palatalised
- *a is not iotated word-initially in a number of words, e.g., агнѧ (agnę) ('lamb'), aблъко (ablъko) ('apple'), aгода (agoda) ('strawberry')
- Use of triple definite article based on the short demonstrative pronouns сь, тъ & нъ, e.g., свитъкосъ (svitъkosъ) ('the scroll right next to me')―typical for all Middle Bulgarian dialects
- Growing avoidance of iotated vowels: *ja > *ě, *jǫ > *ǫ, *ję > *ę, *je > *e (eventually codified in the Euthymian recension)
- Swapping the two yuses according to somewhat artificial rules (also codified in the Euthymian recension)

Most norms reflect the developments in the Moesian dialectal basis of the Tarnovo region at the time.

==== Euthymian recension ====
In the early 1370s, Bulgarian Patriarch Euthymius of Tarnovo implemented a reform to standardize Bulgarian orthography. Instead of bringing the language closer to that of commoners, the "Euthymian", or Tarnovo, recension, rather sought to re-establish older Old Church Slavonic models, further archaizing it. The fall of Bulgaria under Ottoman rule in 1396 precipitated an exodus of Bulgarian men-of-letters, e.g., Cyprian, Gregory Tsamblak, Constantine of Kostenets, etc. to Wallachia, Moldova and the Grand Duchies of Lithuania and Moscow, where they enforced the Euthymian recension as liturgical and chancery language, and to the Serbian Despotate, where it influenced the Resava School.

=== Croatian recension ===
A folio of the 15th-century Missale Romanum Glagolitice, example of Angular Glagolitic.

The Croatian recension of Old Church Slavonic used only the Glagolitic alphabet of angular type. It shows the development of the following characteristics:

- Denasalisation of PSl. *ę > e, PSl. *ǫ > u, e.g., OCS rǫka ("hand") > Cr. ruka, OCS językъ > Cr. jezik ("tongue, language")
- PSl. *y > i, e.g., OCS byti > Cr. biti ("to be")
- PSl. weak-positioned yers *ъ and *ь merged, probably representing some schwa-like sound, and only one of the letters was used (usually 'ъ'). Evident in earliest documents like Baška tablet.
- PSl. strong-positioned yers *ъ and *ь were vocalized into *a in most Štokavian and Čakavian dialects, e.g., OCS pьsъ > Cr. pas ("dog")
- PSl. hard and soft syllabic liquids *r and *r′ retained syllabicity and were written as simply r, as opposed to OCS sequences of mostly rь and rъ, e.g., krstъ and trgъ as opposed to OCS krьstъ and trъgъ ("cross", "market")
- PSl. #vьC and #vъC > #uC, e.g., OCS. vъdova ("widow") > Cr. udova

=== Russian recension ===
The Russian recension emerged in the 1000s based on the earlier Eastern Bulgarian recension, from which it differed slightly. The earliest manuscript to contain Russian elements is the Ostromir Gospel of 1056–1057, which exemplifies the beginning of a Russianized Church Slavonic that gradually spread to liturgical and chancery documents. The Russianization process was cut short in the late 1300s, when a series of Bulgarian prelates, starting with Cyprian, consciously "re-Bulgarized" church texts to achieve maximum conformity with the Euthymian recension. The Russianization process resumed in the late 1400s but was sluggish due to the clergy's hostility towards vernacular use, which they regarded as "contamination of the holy language", and towards using Cyrillics to write any idiom other than Church Slavonic―which was similarly deemed "sacrilegious". Nevertheless, Russian Church Slavonic eventually stabilised and even started projecting influence outwards, until it became entrenched as the de facto standard for all Orthodox Slavs, incl. Serbs and Bulgarians, by the early 1800s. Characteristics:

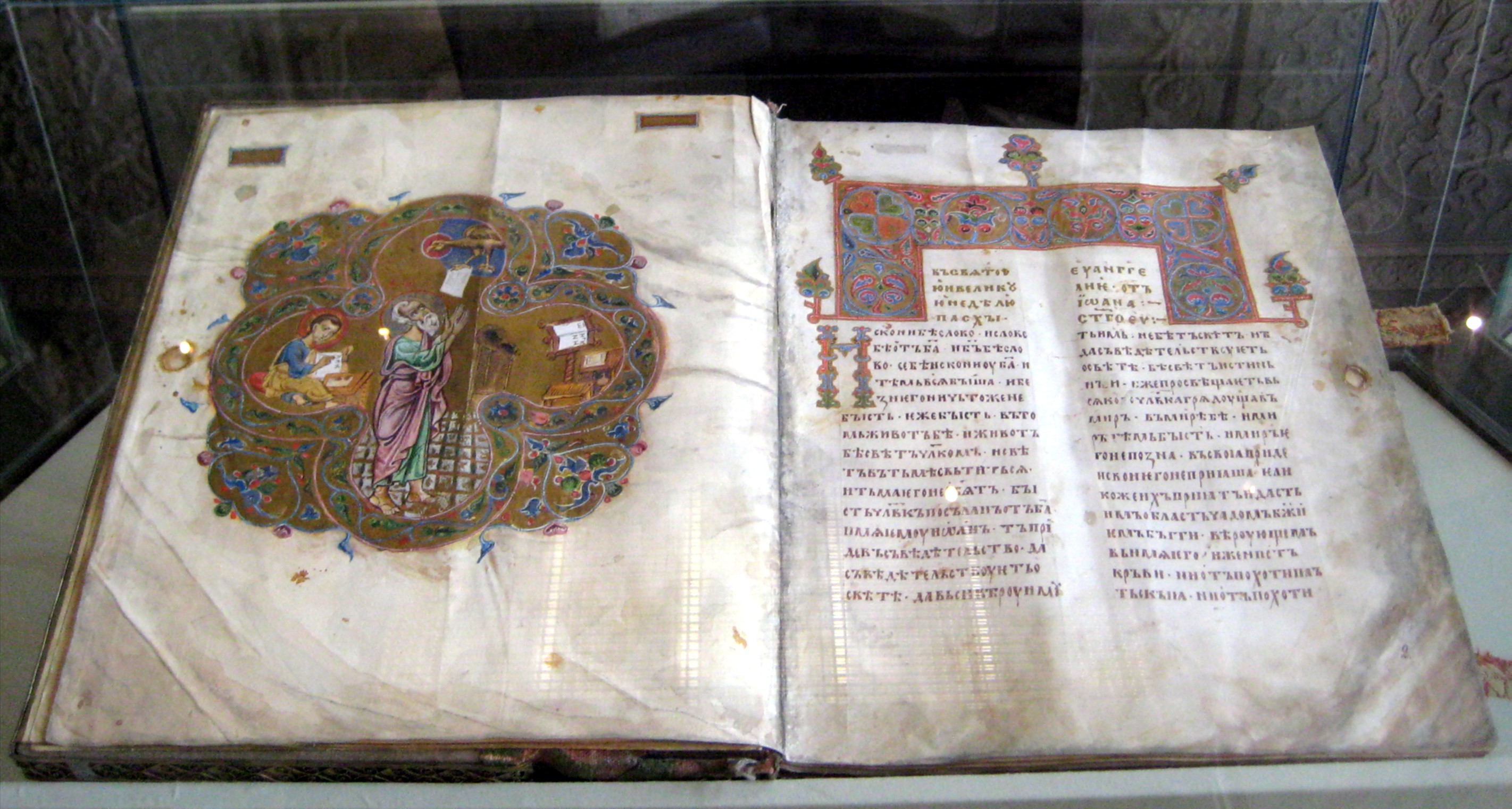
The Mstislav Gospel is a 12th-century Cyrillic manuscript written in Russian Church Slavonic

- PSl. *ę > *ja/ʲa, PSl. *ǫ > u, e.g., OCS rǫka ("hand") > Rus. ruka; OCS językъ > Rus. jazyk ("tongue, language")
- Vocalisation of the yers in strong position (ъ > *ɔ and ь > *ɛ) and their deletion in weak position
- *ě > *e, e.g., OCS věra ("faith") > Rus. vera
- Preservation of a number of South Slavic and Bulgarian phonological and morphological features, which were partly adopted into Russian, e.g.

- Use of ⟨щ⟩ (pronounced *ʃt͡ʃ) instead of East Slavic ⟨ч⟩ (*t͡ʃ) for Proto-Slavic *tj/*gt/*kt: cf. Russian просвещение (prosveščenie) vs. Ukrainian освiчення (osvičennja) ('illumination')
- Use of ⟨жд⟩ (*ʒd) instead of East Slavic ⟨ж⟩ (*ʒ) for Proto-Slavic *dj: cf. Russian одежда (odežda) vs. Ukrainian одежа (odeža) ('clothing')
- Non-pleophonic -ra/-la instead of East Slavic pleophonic -oro/-olo forms: cf. Russian награда (nagrada) vs. Ukrainian нагoрoда (nahoroda) ('reward')
- Prefixes so-/voz-/iz- instead of s-/vz- (z-)/vy-: cf. Russian возбудить (vozbuditь) vs. Ukrainian збудити (zbudyty) ('arouse'), etc.

=== Ruthenian recension ===
The Ruthenian recension generally shows the same characteristics as and is usually subsumed under the Russian recension. The Euthymian recension that was pursued throughout the 1400s was gradually replaced in the 1500s by Ruthenian, an administrative language based on the Belarusian dialect of Vilno.

=== Serbian recension ===
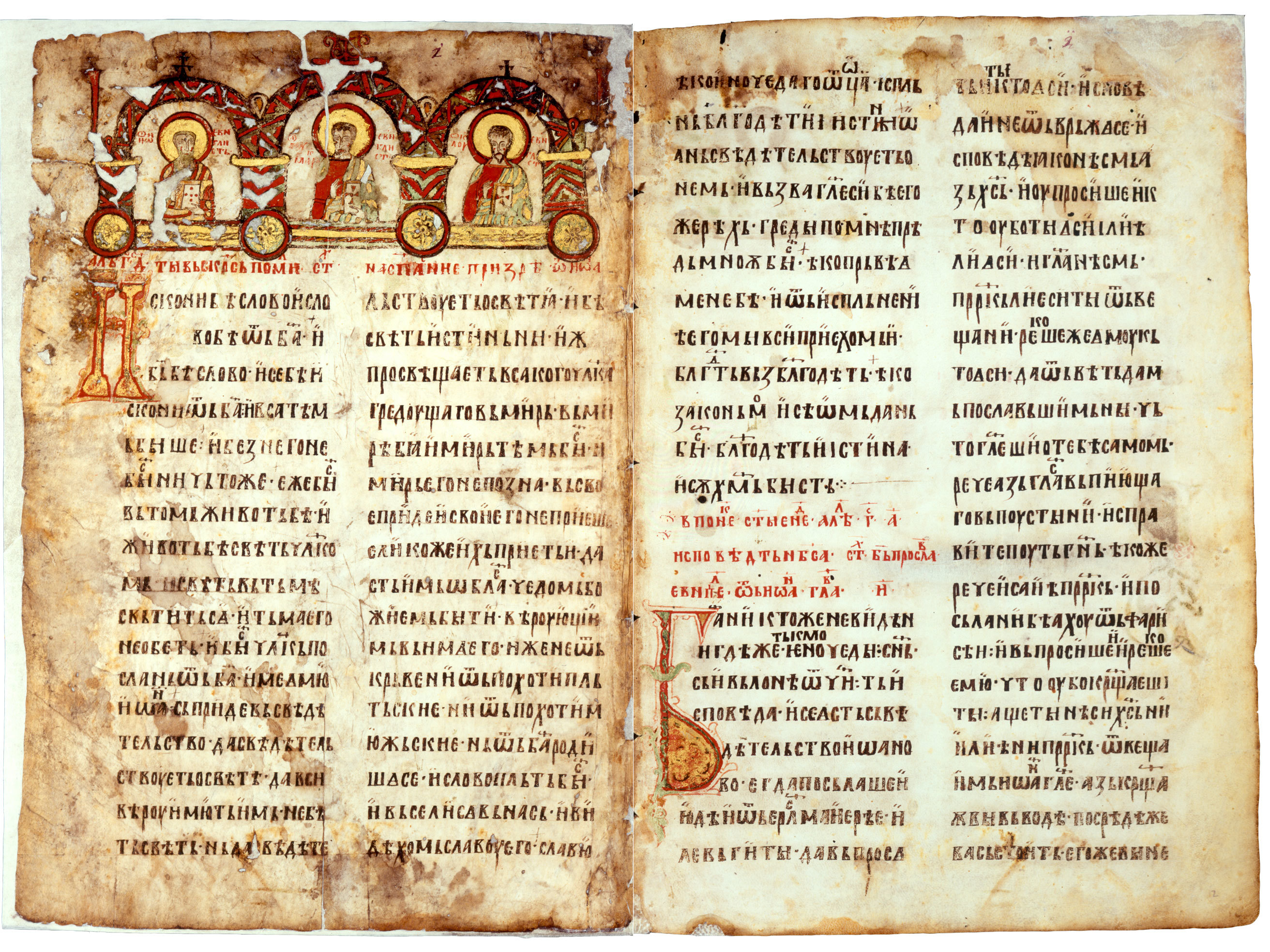
A folio of the (1180) Miroslav Gospel, a notable example of Serbian Cyrillic (UNESCO's Memory of the World Register in Serbia)

The Serbian recension initially employed both the Glagolitic alphabet and the Cyrillic alphabet, but Cyrillic eventually prevailed and was the only script used from the 1200s onwards (apart from limited use of Latin script in coastal areas).

A home-grown side version of the Cyrillic alphabet, commonly known as Serbian Cyrillic, emerged very early on (probably the 10th century).

The penetration of Serbian vernacular phonemes into liturgical texts led to the stabilization of a Serbian pronunciation of Old Church Slavonic and the development of graphic and orthographic solutions. Over time, this evolution produced the Zeta-Hum, Raška, and Resava orthographic schools, named after their respective locations.

The one of oldest preserved manuscript written in the Serbian recension is the Miroslav Gospel, dated to 1180, commissioned by brother of the Great Prince of Serbia Stefan Nemanja. Today is a Serbia UNESCO's Memory of the World international register.

Primary features:

- Nasal vowels were denasalised and in one case closed: *ę > e, *ǫ > u, e.g. OCS rǫka > Sr. ruka ("hand"), OCS językъ > Sr. jezik ("tongue, language")
- Notable extensive use of diacritical signs by the Resava School
- Use of letters i, y for the sound /i/ in other manuscripts of the Serbian recension
- Use of the Old Serbian Letter djerv (Ꙉꙉ) for the Serbian reflexes of Pre-Slavic *tj and *dj (*t͡ɕ, *d͡ʑ, *d͡ʒ, and *tɕ)

==== Resava variant ====
Due to the Ottoman conquest of Bulgaria in 1396, Serbia saw an influx of educated scribes and clergy, who re-introduced a more classical form that resembled more closely the Bulgarian recension. The Resava recension developed around the Resava Literary School, founded by the order of Serbian Despot Stefan Lazarević in the early 1400s and led by Bulgarian scholar Constantine of Kostenets. The recension was closely modelled on the Euthymian one, with etymological use of *ě (yat), *y (yery), etc., use of Bulgarian ⟨щ⟩ (*ʃt) and ⟨жд⟩ (*ʒd) for Proto-Slavic *tj/*gt/*kt and *dj, but replacing yuses with Serbian reflexes *ę > e & *ǫ > u. In the late 1400s and early 1500s, the Resava orthography spread to Bulgaria and North Macedonia and exerted substantial influence on Wallachia. It was eventually superseded by Russian Church Slavonic in the late 1700s and early 1800s.

== Role in modern Slavic languages ==
Old Church Slavonic was initially widely intelligible across the Slavic world. However, with the gradual differentiation of individual languages, Orthodox Slavs and, to some extent, Croatians ended up in a situation of diglossia, where they used one Slavic language for religious and another one for everyday affairs. The resolution of this situation, and the choice made for the exact balance between Old Church Slavonic and vernacular elements and forms is key to understanding the relationship between (Old) Church Slavonic and modern Slavic literary languages, as well as the distance between individual languages.

It was first Russian polymath and grammarian Mikhail Lomonosov that defined in 1755 "three styles" to the balance of Church Slavonic and Russian elements in the Russian literary language: a high style—with substantial Old Church Slavonic influence—for formal occasions and heroic poems; a low style—with substantial influence of the vernacular—for comedy, prose and ordinary affairs; and a middle style, balancing between the two, for informal verse epistles, satire, etc.

The middle, "Slaveno-Russian", style eventually prevailed. Thus, while standard Russian was codified on the basis of the Central Russian dialect and the Moscow chancery language, it retains an entire stylistic layer of Church Slavonisms with typically Eastern South Slavic phonetic features. Where native and Church Slavonic terms exist side by side, the Church Slavonic one is in the higher stylistic register and is usually more abstract, e.g., the neutral город (gorod) vs. the poetic град (grаd) ('town').

Bulgarian faced a similar dilemma a century later, with three camps championing Church Slavonic, Slaveno-Bulgarian, and New Bulgarian as a basis for the codification of modern Bulgarian. Here the proponents of the analytic vernacular eventually won. However, the language re-imported a vast number of Church Slavonic forms, regarded as a legacy of Old Bulgarian, either directly from Russian Church Slavonic or through the mediation of Russian.

By contrast, Serbian made a clean break with (Old) Church Slavonic in the first half of the 1800s, as part of Vuk Karadžić's linguistic reform, opting instead to build the modern Serbian language from the ground up, based on the Eastern Herzegovinian dialect. Ukrainian and Belarusian, in the mid and late 1800s, as well as Macedonian in the late 1940s, took a similar path, respectively, the former two because of the association of Old Church Slavonic with stifling Russian imperial control and the latter in an attempt to distance the newly-codified language as further away from Bulgarian as possible.

== Canon ==
The core corpus of Old Church Slavonic manuscripts is usually referred to as canon. Manuscripts must satisfy certain linguistic, chronological and cultural criteria to be incorporated into the canon: they must not significantly depart from the language and tradition of Saints Cyril and Methodius, usually known as the Cyrillo-Methodian tradition.

For example, the Freising Fragments, dating from the 10th century, show some linguistic and cultural traits of Old Church Slavonic, but they are usually not included in the canon, as some of the phonological features of the writings appear to belong to certain Pannonian Slavic dialect of the period. Similarly, the Ostromir Gospels exhibits dialectal features that classify it as East Slavic, rather than South Slavic so it is not included in the canon either. On the other hand, the Kiev Missal is included in the canon even though it manifests some West Slavic features and contains Western liturgy because of the Bulgarian linguistic layer and connection to the Moravian mission.

Manuscripts are usually classified in two groups, depending on the alphabet used, Cyrillic or Glagolitic. With the exception of the Kiev Missal and Glagolita Clozianus, which exhibit West Slavic and Croatian features respectively, all Glagolitic texts are assumed to be of the Macedonian recension:

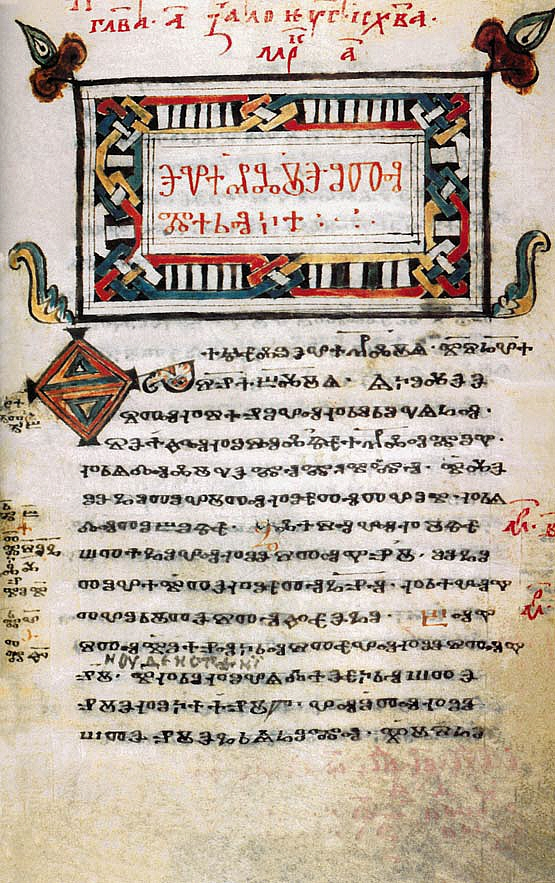
About two-thirds of the Old Church Slavonic canon is written in the Glagolitic alphabet.

- Kiev Missal (Ki, KM), 7 folios, late 10th century
- Codex Zographensis, (Zo), 288 folios, 10th or 11th century
- Codex Marianus (Mar), 173 folios, early 11th century
- Codex Assemanius (Ass), 158 folios, early 11th century
- Psalterium Sinaiticum (Pas, Ps. sin.), 177 folios, 11th century
- Euchologium Sinaiticum (Eu, Euch), 109 folios, 11th century
- Glagolita Clozianus (Clo, Cloz), 14 folios, 11th century
- Ohrid Folios (Ohr), 2 folios, 11th century
- Rila Folios (Ri, Ril), 2 folios and 5 fragments, 11th century

All Cyrillic manuscripts are of the Preslav recension (Preslav Literary School) and date from the 11th century except for the Zographos, which is of the Ohrid recension (Ohrid Literary School):

- Sava's book (Sa, Sav), 126 folios
- Codex Suprasliensis, (Supr), 284 folios
- Enina Apostle (En, Enin), 39 folios
- Hilandar Folios (Hds, Hil), 2 folios
- Undol'skij's Fragments (Und), 2 folios
- Macedonian Folio (Mac), 1 folio
- Zographos Fragments (Zogr. Fr.), 2 folios
- Sluck Psalter (Ps. Sl., Sl), 5 folios

== Sample text ==
Here is the Lord's Prayer in Old Church Slavonic:

Cyrillic	IPA	Transliteration	Translation
отьчє нашь· ижє ѥси на нєбєсѣхъ: да свѧтитъ сѧ имѧ твоѥ· да придєтъ цѣсар҄ьствиѥ твоѥ· да бѫдєтъ волꙗ твоꙗ ꙗко на нєбєси и на ꙁємл҄и: хлѣбъ нашь насѫщьнꙑи даждь намъ дьньсь· и отъпоусти намъ длъгꙑ нашѧ ꙗко и мꙑ отъпоущаѥмъ длъжьникомъ нашимъ· и нє въвєди насъ въ искоушєниѥ· нъ иꙁбави нꙑ отъ нєприꙗꙁни჻	otɪtʃe naʃɪ jɪʒe jesi na nebesæxʊ da svẽtitʊ sẽ jɪmẽ tvoje da pridetʊ tsæsaɼɪstvije tvoje da bɔ̃detʊ voʎa tvoja jako na nebesi i na zemʎi. xlæbʊ naʃɪ nasɔ̃ʃtɪnɯjɪ daʒdɪ namʊ dɪnɪsɪ i otʊpusti namʊ dlʊgɯ naʃẽ jako i mɯ otʊpuʃtajemʊ dlʊʒɪnikomʊ naʃimʊ. i ne vʊvedi nasʊ vʊ jɪskuʃenije nʊ izbavi nɯ otʊ neprijazni.	otĭče našĭ Iže jesi na nebesěxŭ. Da svętitŭ sę imę tvoje da pridetŭ cěsar'ĭstvije tvoje da bǫdetŭ voʎa tvoja jako na nebesi i na zeml'i. hlěbŭ našĭ nasǫštĭnyi daždĭ namŭ dĭnĭsĭ i otŭpusti namŭ dlŭgy našę jako i my otŭpuštajemŭ dlŭžĭnikomŭ našimŭ i ne vŭvedi nasŭ vŭ iskušenije nŭ izbavi ny otŭ neprijazni.	Our father Who art in the heavens. May hallowed be thy name may come thy kingdom may become thy will as in heaven, also on Earth. Our supersubstantial bread give us this day and release us of our debts as we also release our debtors, and do not lead us to temptation but free us from the evil one.

== Authors ==
The history of Old Church Slavonic writing includes a northern tradition begun by the mission to Great Moravia, including a short mission in the Lower Pannonia, and a Bulgarian tradition begun by some of the missionaries who relocated to Bulgaria after the expulsion from Great Moravia.

The first texts written in Old Church Slavonic are translations of the Gospels and Byzantine liturgical texts begun by the Byzantine missionaries Saints Cyril and Methodius, mostly during their mission to Great Moravia.

The most important authors in Old Church Slavonic after the death of Methodius and the dissolution of the Great Moravian academy were Clement of Ohrid (active also in Great Moravia), Constantine of Preslav, Chernorizetz Hrabar and John Exarch, all of whom worked in medieval Bulgaria at the end of the 9th and the beginning of the 10th century. The full text of the Second Book of Enoch is only preserved in Old Church Slavonic, although the original most certainly had been in Greek or even Hebrew or Aramaic.

== See also ==
- Outline of Slavic history and culture
- List of Slavic studies journals
- History of the Bulgarian language
- Church Slavonic language
- Old East Slavic
- List of Glagolitic manuscripts
- Proto-Slavic language
- Slavonic-Serbian

== Bibliography ==
- Alexander, June Granatir (2005). "Slovakia". In Richard C. Frucht, ed., Eastern Europe: An Introduction to the People, Lands, and Culture, Volume 2: Central Europe, pp. 283–328. Santa Barbara, CA: ABC-CLIO. ISBN 978-1-576-07800-6.
- Birnbaum, Henrik (1991). Aspects of the Slavic Middle Ages and Slavic Renaissance Culture. New York, NY: Peter Lang. ISBN 978-0-820-41057-9.
- Čiževskij, Dmitrij (2000) [1971]. Comparative History of Slavic Literatures. Nashville, TN: Vanderbilt University Press. ISBN 978-0-826-51371-7.
- Crampton, R. J. (2005). A Concise History of Bulgaria (2nd ed.). Cambridge: Cambridge University Press. ISBN 978-0-521-61637-9.
- Cubberley, Paul (2002). Russian: A Linguistic Introduction. Cambridge: Cambridge University Press. ISBN 978-0-521-79191-5.
- Curta, Florin (2006). Southeastern Europe in the Middle Ages, 500–1250. Cambridge: Cambridge University Press. ISBN 978-0-521-81539-0.
- Duridanov, Ivan, ed. (1991). Граматика на старобългарския език [Grammar of Old Bulgarian] (in Bulgarian). Sofia: Издателство на Българската академия на науките. ISBN 954-430-159-3.
- Huntley, David (1993). "Old Church Slavonic". In Comrie, Bernard; Corbett, Greville G. (eds.). The Slavonic Languages. London: Routledge. pp. 125–187. ISBN 978-0-415-04755-5.
- Kamusella, Tomasz (2008). The Politics of Language and Nationalism in Modern Central Europe. Basingstoke: Palgrave Macmillan. ISBN 978-0-230-29473-8.
- Lunt, Horace G. (2001). Old Church Slavonic Grammar (7th ed.). Berlin: Mouton de Gruyter. ISBN 978-3-110-16284-4.
- Malkiel, Yakov (1993). Etymology. New York: Cambridge University Press. ISBN 9780521311663.
- Marti, Roland (2012). "On the creation of Croatian: The development of Croatian Latin orthography in the 16th century". In Baddeley, Susan; Voeste, Anja (eds.). Orthographies in Early Modern Europe'. Berlin: De Gruyter Mouton. pp. 269–320. doi:10.1515/9783110288179.269. ISBN 978-3-110-28817-9.
- Mirchev, Kiril (1978). Историческа граматика на българския език [Historical Grammar of the Bulgarian Language] (3rd ed.). Sofia: Наука и изкуство.
- Nandriș, Grigore (1959). Old Church Slavonic Grammar. London: Athlone Press.
- Richards, Ronald O. (2003). The Pannonian Slavic Dialect of the Common Slavic Proto-language: The View from Old Hungarian. Los Angeles: University of California. ISBN 9780974265308.
- Stolz, Benjamin A.; Titunik, I. R.; Doležel, Lubomír, eds. (1984). Language and Literary Theory: In Honor of Ladislav Matejka. Ann Arbor, MI: University of Michigan Press. ISBN 978-0-930-04259-2.
- Sussex, Roland; Cubberley, Paul (2006). The Slavic Languages. Cambridge Language Surveys. Cambridge: Cambridge University Press. ISBN 978-1-139-45728-6.
- Tóth, Imre H. (1996). "The Significance of the Freising Manuscripts (FM) for Slavic Studies in Hungary". Zbornik Brižinski spomeniki. Ljubljana: Slovenska akademija znanosti in umetnosti. pp. 443–448. ISBN 9788671311007.
- Trunte, Nicolina (2022). Словѣньскъи ѩзыкъ. Ein praktisches Lehrbuch des Kirchenslavischen in 30 Lektionen. Zugleich eine Einführung in die slavische Philologie. Band 1: Altkirchenslavisch (6th ed.).
- Trunte, Nicolina (2014). Славе́нскїй я҆зы́къ. Lehrbuch des Kirchenslavischen in 30 Lektionen. Zugleich eine Einführung in die slavische Philologie. Band 2: Mittel- und Neukirchenslavisch (2nd ed.). München / Berlin / Washington, D.C.: Verlag Otto Sagner. ISBN 978-3-86688-427-4.
- Trunte, Nicolina (2022). Kirchenslavisch in 14 Lektionen (2nd ed.). Wiesbaden: Harrassowitz. ISBN 978-3-447-10953-6.
- Vlasto, A. P. (1970). The Entry of the Slavs into Christendom: An Introduction to the Medieval History of the Slavs. Cambridge: Cambridge University Press. ISBN 978-0-521-07459-9.
- Waldman, Carl; Mason, Catherine (2006). Encyclopedia of European Peoples, Volume 2: M–Z. Facts On File Library of World History. New York, NY: Facts On File. ISBN 978-1-438-12918-1.
