= Psalterium Sinaiticum =

11th century Old Church Slavonic psalter

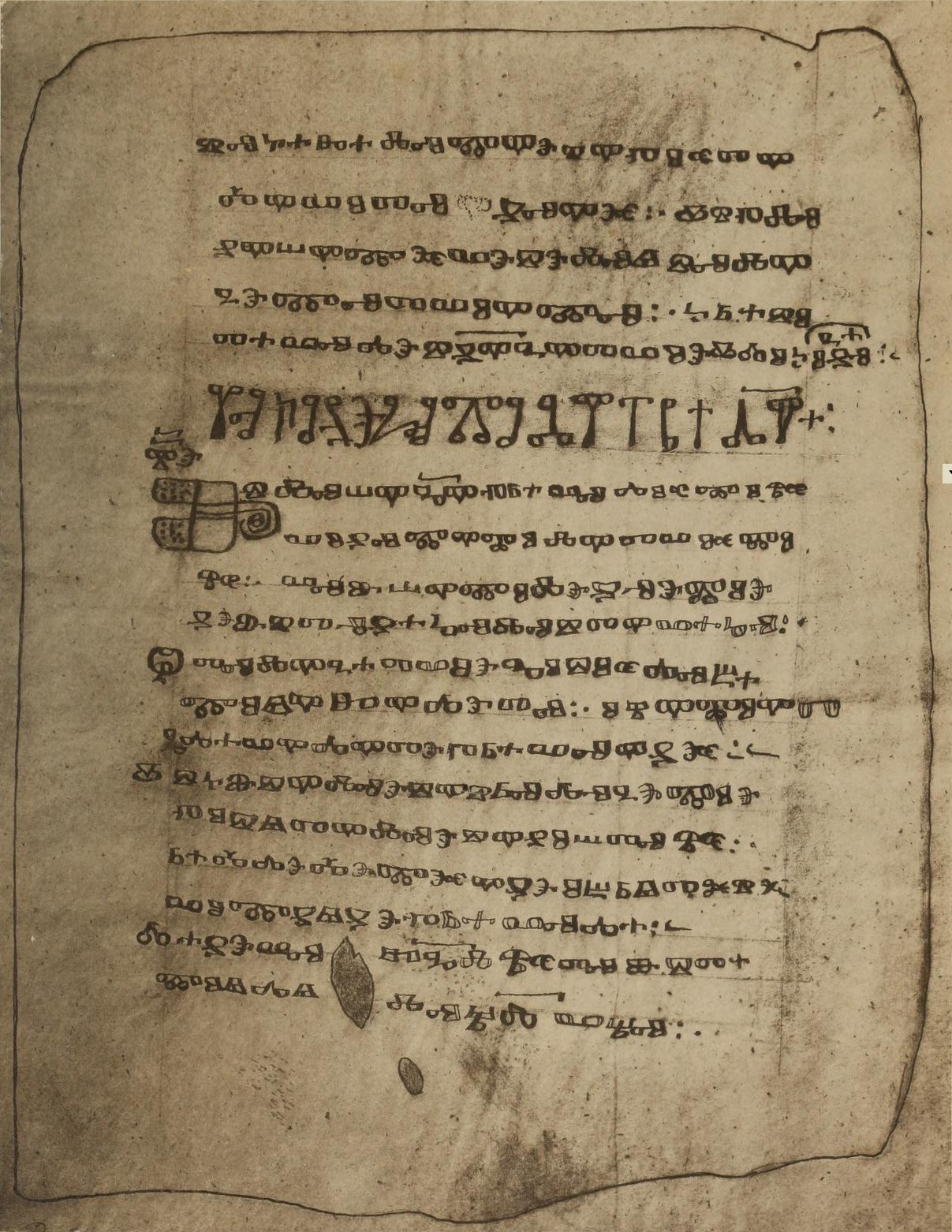
Psalterium Sinaiticum, folio 16 recto (manuscript Sin. slav. 38)

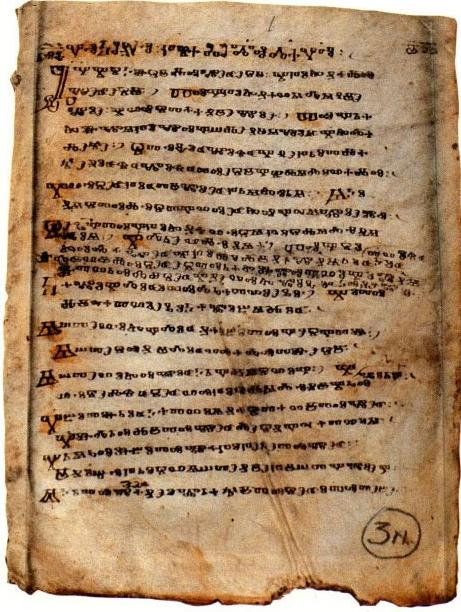
Folio 1 recto from the continuation of the Psalterium (manuscript Sin. slav. 2/N)

The Psalterium Sinaiticum (scholarly abbreviations: Psa or Ps. sin.) is a 209-folio Glagolitic Old Church Slavonic canon manuscript, the earliest and a complete Slavic psalter, dated to the 11th century. It is considered to have been written in western Bulgaria or Macedonia. The manuscript was found in Saint Catherine's Monastery in Egypt, after which it was named and where it remains to this day.

== Discovery and editions ==
The major part of the psalter (177 folios) was discovered in 1850 by the Russian archimandrite Porphyrius Uspensky (Sin. slav. 38/O). Additional 32 folios with the exact continuation (Ps. 138-150 and the 14 canticles) were discovered in 1975 (Sin. slav. 2/N).

The manuscript was first published in Cyrillic transcription by Leopold Geitler. Geitler visited Egypt in 1880, but was given little time to work with the manuscript in the monastery, and consequently his edition, published in 1883, is regarded as unreliable. The text was again published by Sergey N. Severyanov in 1922, and supplied with a dictionary. Moshé Altbauer published a facsimile reproduction in 1971.

The second portion of the manuscript was extensively discussed with facsimile reproductions by Ioannis C. Tarnanidis in 1988. A critical edition of the new portion was published under the editorship of František Václav Mareš in 1997.

=== Bibliography of editions ===
- Lavoslav Geitler. Psalterium: Glagolski spomenik manastira Sinai brda. Zagreb: JAZU, 1883.
- Сергей Северьяновъ. Синайская псалтырь: глаголическій памятникъ XI вѣка. Петроградъ: РАН, 1922. (reprinted in Graz, 1954)
- Moshé Altbauer (ed.). Psalterium Sinaiticum / Синајски псалтир. Скопје: МАНУ, 1971. (facsimile of 38/O)
- Ioannis C. Tarnanidis. The Slavonic Manuscripts Discovered in 1975 at. St. Catherine's Monastery on Mount Sinai. Thessaloniki: St. Catherine's Monastery and The Hellenic Association for Slavic Studies, 1988. (fascimile of 2/N)
- Franciscus V. Mareš (ed.). Psalterii Sinaitici pars nova (monasterii s. Catharinae codex slav. 2/N). Wien: Österreichischen Akademie der Wissenschaften, 1997.

== See also ==
- List of Glagolitic manuscripts (900–1199)
- Lists of Glagolitic manuscripts

== Sources ==
- Damjanović, Stjepan (2004). Slovo iskona. Zagreb: Matica hrvatska. ISBN 953-150-567-5.
- Mareš, Franciscus V., ed. (1997). Psalterii Sinaitici pars nova (monasterii s. Catharinae codex slav. 2/N). Vienna: Österreichische Akademie der Wissenschaften.
- Schaeken, Jos; Birnbaum, Henrik (1999). Die altkirchenslavische Schriftkultur. München: Otto Sagner.
- Schenker, Alexander (1995). The Dawn of Slavic: An Introduction to Slavic Philology. New Haven: Yale University Press. ISBN 0-300-05846-2.
- Nazor, Anica (1972). "Moshé Altbauer, Psalterium Sinaiticum, an 11th century glagolitic manuscript from St. Catherines's monastery, mt. Sinai" (PDF). Slovo: Časopis Staroslavenskoga instituta u Zagrebu (in Croatian) (22): 146–148.
