= Alexander M. Schenker =

Polish-American Slavist (1924–2019)

- Born: December 20, 1924; Kraków, Poland
- Died: August 21, 2019 (aged 94); Branford, Connecticut, U.S.
- Citizenship: Polish; American
- Occupation: Slavist
- Spouse: Krystyna Schenker

Alexander M. "Olek" Schenker (December 20, 1924 – August 21, 2019) was a Polish-American Slavist. A professor of Slavic linguistics at Yale University, he was the recipient of the Award for Distinguished Contributions to Slavic Studies for his contributions to the field of Polish studies, as well for the general contributions to the development of the field of Slavic studies in the United States.

== Biography ==
Schenker was born Aleksander Szenker to a Jewish family in Kraków in 1924, the son of Oskar Szenker and Gizela (née Szamińska).

He was enrolled at the university in Dushanbe (then Stalinabad) in Tajikistan during World War II. Later he studied at the Sorbonne, receiving his Ph.D. from Yale in 1953, where he eventually settled as a professor of Slavic studies.

== Work ==
At Yale University in the 1950s he participated in the creation of one of America's leading programs of Slavic languages and literatures, culminating in what was to become a classic textbook for teaching Polish in English: Beginning Polish (1966). His other notable works include:

- Polish Declension (1964), monograph
- Polish Conjugation (1954), article
- Gender Categories in Polish (1955), article
- Some Remarks on Polish Quantifiers (1971), article
- The Slavic Literary Languages: Formation and Development, coedited with Edward Stankiewicz (1980),
- The Dawn of Slavic: An Introduction to Slavic Philology (1996), his greatest book, receiving MLA'ss Scaglione Prize for Studies in Slavic Languages and Literatures.
- The Bronze Horseman: Falconet's Monument to Peter the Great (2003)
