= Rila Literary School =

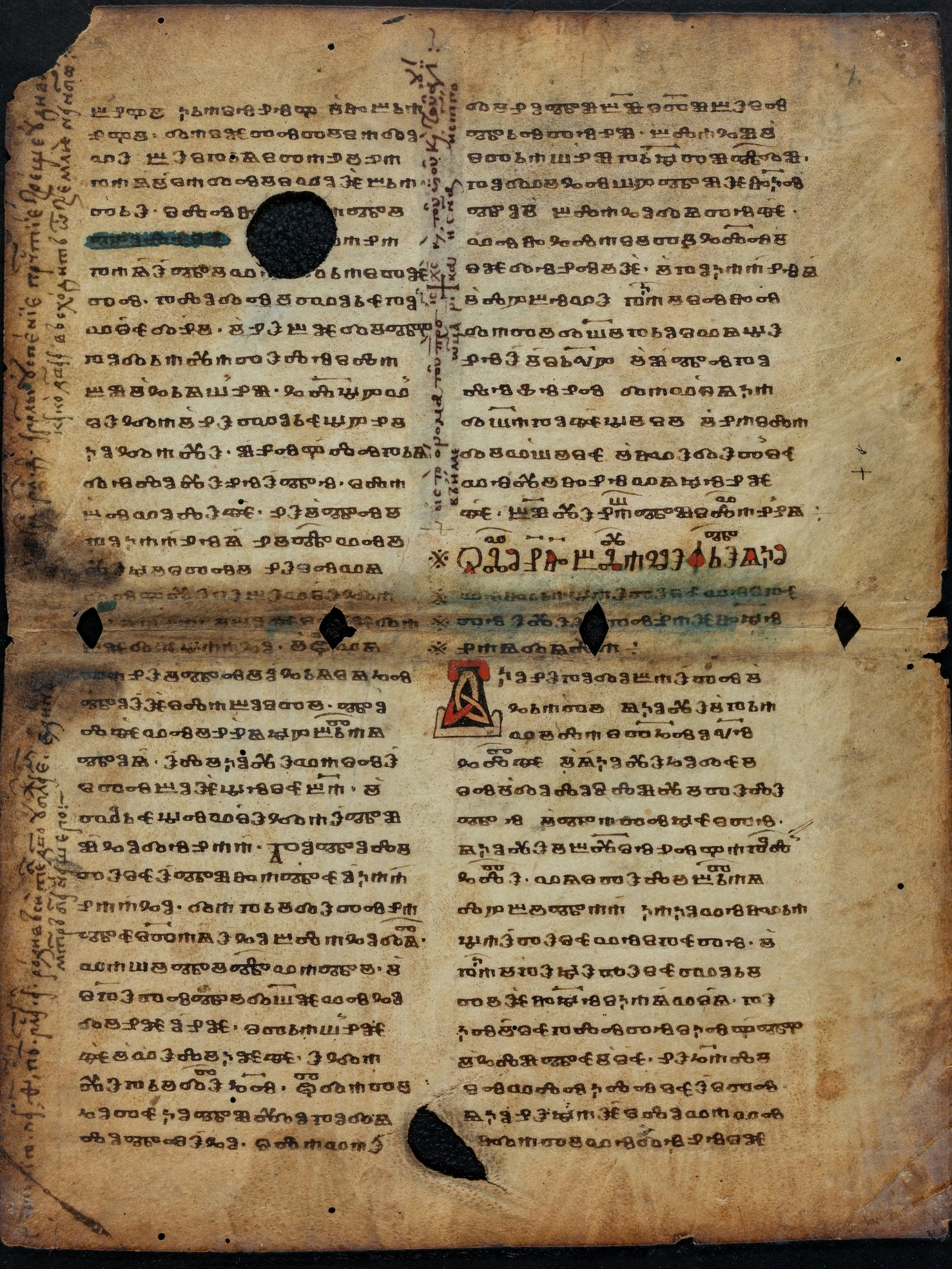
Rila Glagolitic sheets (parts of the Parenesis of Ephrem the Syrian) date back to the 11th century.

The Rila Literary School is medieval and Renaissance at the same time, reflecting the transition from Middle Bulgarian to New Bulgarian in modern times.

A guardian of previous literary traditions, it reflects and combines, at the same time, the desire to preserve the literary wealth of medieval Bulgaria with the rule of time for accessible and mass literacy through the Damaskins.

The beginning is marked by the works of Vladislav Gramatik and Demetrius Kantakouzenos, and the end - by the life and work of Neofit Rilski.
