= Ohrid Glagolitic fragments =

10th century Glagothic manuscript

Ohrid Glagolitic Fragments
- Охридские глаголические листки
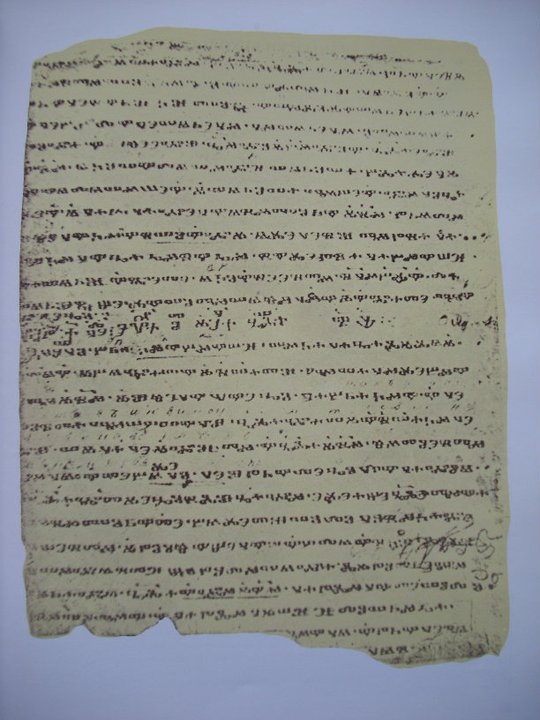
- A page of the Ohrid Manuscript
- Size: 17x20 cm
- Period/culture: 966-981
- Discovered: 1845
- Discovered by: Viktor Grigorovich
- Place: Ohrid
- Present location: Odessa National Scientific Library
- Identification: Cod. 1/2 (532)
- Language: Glagolitic script
- Culture: Slavic

The Ohrid Gospel or Ohrid Glagolitic fragments (Latin: Evangelium Achridanum; Russian: Охридские глаголические листки, Okhridskiye glagolicheskiye listki) is a Glagolitic manuscript from the 10th century AD. It contains text from the Gospel of Luke 24 and parts of the Gospel of John, written on 20 leaves of parchment, each about 17 cm × 20 cm (6.7 in × 7.9 in) each.

The fragments were discovered by Russian scientist Viktor Grigorovich in 1845 in Ohrid (in modern North Macedonia), and were donated by him on 1 May 1865 as the 24th of 60 Slavic manuscripts from his collection to the University of Odessa. It was kept in the university until 1930, and is now kept in the Odessa National Scientific Library. The text was first published by Ishmael Srenevsky.

== See also ==
- List of Glagolitic manuscripts (900–1199)
- Lists of Glagolitic manuscripts

== Sources ==
- Срезневский, И. И. (1866). Древные глаголические памятники [Ancient Glagothic Monuments] (in Russian). Vol. 1. pp. 76–87.
- Грузинский, Н. К. (1906). Охридское евангелие [The Ohrid Gospel] (in Russian). Vol. XI. Известия Отделения русского языка и словесности Императорской Академии наук. pp. 157–164.
- Vondrák, Václav (1910). Kirchenslawische Chrestomathie [Church Slavonic Chrestomathy] (in German). Göttingen. pp. 9–10.
- Ильинский, Г.А. (1915). Охридские глаголические листки. Отрывок древне-церковно-славянского евангелия XI в. [Ohrid Glagolitic Leaflets. A fragment of the ancient Church Slavonic Gospel of the 11th century]. Petrograd.
