= Relationship of Cyrillic and Glagolitic scripts =

As the 9th-century missionaries Saints Cyril and Methodius undertook their mission to evangelize to the Slavs of Great Moravia, two writing systems were developed: Glagolitic and Cyrillic. Both scripts were based on the Greek alphabet and share commonalities, but the exact nature of relationship between the Glagolitic alphabet and the Early Cyrillic alphabet, their order of development, and influence on each other has been a matter of great study, controversy, and dispute in Slavic studies.

== Glagolitic precedence ==
The theory that Glagolitic script was created before Cyrillic was first put forth by G. Dobner in 1785, and since Pavel Jozef Šafárik's 1857 study of Glagolitic monuments, Über den Ursprung und die Heimat des Glagolitismus, there has been a virtual consensus in the academic circles that St. Cyril developed the Glagolitic alphabet, rather than the Cyrillic. This view is supported by numerous linguistic, paleographic, and historical accounts. Points that support this view include:

1. The Greek-derived Cyrillic script spread quickly across the Slavia Orthodoxa lands because it replaced the Glagolitic alphabet, which was designed to fit the sound system of Slavic speech. By comparison, the West Slavic languages, as well as Slovene and Croatian, took a longer time to adapt the Roman alphabet to their local needs with special digraphs and diacritics for Slavic phonemes becoming accepted only with the advent of printing in the 16th century.
2. There are significantly fewer Glagolitic monuments, suggesting that the new writing system was replaced by a newer system that was more vigorous and voluminous in output.
3. Old Church Slavonic canon monuments written in Glagolitic script are generally older than their Cyrillic counterparts.
4. The most archaic features of Old Church Slavonic canon monuments (e.g., the uncontracted and unassimilated endings of definite adjective forms -aego, -aago, -aemu, -aamu, -uemu, -uumu as opposed to contracted forms; second- and third-person dual imperfect endings -šeta, -šete as opposed to the -sta, -ste in Cyrillic monuments; sigmatic aorist is not attested in Glagolitic monuments, which otherwise preserve more morphological archaisms) are generally much more common in Glagolitic than in Cyrillic canon. The evidence of pre-Moravian-mission phonetics the Glagolitic alphabet was devised for and which it indirectly reflects, characteristic of the phonological system of a South Slavic Macedonian dialect in a specific timeframe of the late 9th century, the đerv, št and dzelo, and are present in Glagolitic monuments either exclusively or predominantly, further corroborates their antiquity over Cyrillic in which these sounds are absent or changed by means of sound changes assumed to have occurred in the later period.
5. Of surviving Old Church Slavonic palimpsests, the observed tendency is for Glagolitic or Cyrillic to be written over Glagolitic, or Cyrillic over Cyrillic, but never Glagolitic over Cyrillic. All extant palimpsests are written in Cyrillic and modern photographic analysis has shown a previous layer of Glagolitic letters.
6. Some Cyrillic canon monuments contain occasional Glagolitic letters, words or sentences, all of which are written by the hand of the same scribe. Conversely, Cyrillic words or letters found in the Glagolitic monuments are seen as later additions.
7. Cyrillic glosses are present in Glagolitic manuscripts but not the other way around.
8. Some scribal errors in Cyrillic monuments indicate that the Cyrillic manuscript was copied from a Glagolitic original. For example, in Sava's book ѧзоікомъ is written instead of ѧзꙑкомъ. The digraph оі is written in Glagolitic as ⰑⰋ, while ꙑ is written as ⰟⰋ. The similarity of Glagolitic letters Ⱏ and Ⱁ has caused an obvious spelling mistake.
9. The numerical value of Glagolitic letters is an orderly progression in agreement with the sequence of letters in the alphabet allowing for the writing of numbers past at least 2,000. Cyrillic numerals, on the other hand, follow Greek numerical usage and do not assign numerical values to certain non-Greek Slavic letters (b, ž, št, š, y, ĕ, ь, ъ). This makes necessary the use of a thousands sign similar to the Greek sampi for marking numbers larger than 999. This also means letters pronounced similarly have different numerical values in the Glagolitic and Cyrillic numeral systems. Discernable scribal errors indicate transposition from Glagolitic numeral system into Cyrillic, not the other way around.
10. Glagolitic monuments contain many more untranslated Greek words, which implies they are preserving the original text of translations conducted by St. Cyril. Furthermore, Glagolitic monuments contain many errors in translated phrases, and Cyrillic monuments have significantly rectified those errors.
11. The style of the Glagolitic monuments is often unclear and sometimes almost completely unintelligible without the Greek original (e.g. a series of pages in the Glagolita Clozianus). This should indicate their creation toward the early period of Slavic literacy when there was no skill in translation.
12. The relation between the Glagolitic monuments in Moravia and those in the Balkans is best explained by presuming expansion of the Glagolitic tradition from Moravia, before the 10th century when the Magyar–German wedge separated Western and Southern Slavs.

The later development of the angular Croatian Glagolitic and its different appearance from the rounded Old Church Slavonic form of the alphabet caused some confusion as to the precedence of Glagolitic over Cyrillic.

== Chernorizets Hrabar's account ==
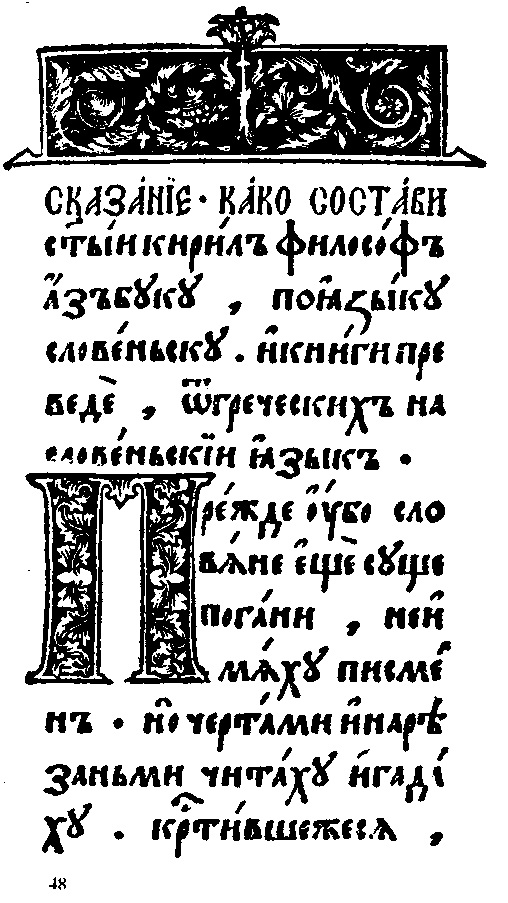
Leaf 40 of a preserved manuscript containing Hrabar's account

In his famous treatise On the Letters (Church Slavonic: О Писмєньхъ), written as early as the end of the 9th or beginning of the 10th Century, the Bulgarian monk Chernorizets Hrabar stated:

Прѣжде ѹбо словѣне не имѣхѫ писменъ · нѫ чрътами и рѣзами чьтѣхѫ и гатаахѫ погани сѫще · кръстивше же сѧ · римьсками и гръчьскыми писмены · нѫждаахѫ сѧ словѣнскы рѣчь безъ устроениа… Потомже чл҃колюбецъ б҃ъ… посла имь ст҃го Кѡнстантина философа · нарицаемаго Кирила · мѫжа праведна и истинна · и сътвори имъ · л҃ писмена и осмь · ѡва убѡ по чинѹ Гръчьскъıхь писменъ · ѡва же по словѣнъстѣи рѣчи

Being still pagans, the Slavs did not have their own letters, but read and communicated by means of tallies and sketches. After their baptism they were forced to use Roman and Greek letters in the transcription of their Slavic words but these were not suitable ... At last, God, in his love for mankind, sent them St. Constantine the Philosopher, called Cyril, a learned and upright man, who composed for them 38 letters, some [24 of them] similar to the Greek, but some [14 of them] different, suitable to express Slavic sounds.

According to Schenker (1995), Hrabar's account points to an earlier usage of Greek and Roman alphabet for writing by the Slavs, which was a very difficult task. The initial letters of the words he cites illustrate that. The initial consonants in живѣтъ (ž; IPA: [ʒ]), ѕело (dz; IPA: [dz]), церковь (c; IPA: [ts]), чаание (č; IPA: [tʃ]), and широта (š; IPA: [ʃ]) were completely absent in the contemporary Byzantine Greek phonology, as well as the initial nasal vowels illustrated by ѫдоу (ǫ) and ѧзыкъ (ę). The same is true for the initial syllable in юность (ju or ü). In other cases, changes in pronunciation from Ancient Greek to Byzantine Greek made the letters no longer suitable for Slavic versions of the letters. For example, in the word богъ, the Greek letters β and γ, by the time of Byzantine Greek, were pronounced as labial and velar fricatives instead of voiced bilabial and velar stops. Similarly, the Greek letter η had acquired the phonetic value of [i] in Byzantine Greek, making it no longer suitable to represent the initial yus in the word ꙗдъ.

Hrabar's phrase "чрътами и рѣзами," which translates as "tallies and sketches" or "strokes and incisions," has long puzzled scholars. Possible meanings range from simple marks used as an aid in counting, to adaptations of Turkic (as in Proto-Bulgar epigraphy) and Germanic (such as of the Gothic alphabet created by Wulfila) runes. However, no authentic Slavic runic writing been discovered, despite linguistic traces of Bulgar and Gothic tribes interacting with Slavic tribes and the Proto-Slavic Urheimat. Furthermore, the Glagolitic alphabet does not contain any runic elements.

Hrabar's account further describes how St. Cyril was sent by God to the Slavs "to compose 38 letters, some according to the shape of Greek letters, some according to the Slavic word." This particular statement has led some philologists to conclude Hrabar is speaking of the Cyrillic script. However, that theory is disputed by the analysis of St. M. Kuljbakin in Beleške o Hrabrovoj Apologiji (Glas SKA, Beograd, 1935). According to Kuljbakin, Hrabar's 38 letters corresponds to the number of letter in the Glagolitic alphabet, while the Early Cyrillic script had more than 40 graphemes.

According to I. Gošev, another statement by Hrabar points to the Glagolitic alphabet. When Hrabar writes that the first letter of the alphabet compiled by St. Cyrill, Ⰰ (азъ), was "God's gift" to the Slavs and therefore was markèdly different from pagan Greek α (alpha). In this interpretation, Ⰰ represents the sign of the cross and is a symbolic invocation of God's blessing.

Bulgarian scholar Emil Georgiev is the most vocal supporter of the theory of the development of Cyrillic from a Slavic Greek-based writing alphabet; however, no examples of such a script have been preserved. Georgiev does not deny that St. Cyril developed the Glagolitic script, but he argues Cyrillic is the older script, deriving from cursive Greek.

== The "Russian letters" in Vita Constantini ==
и обрѣт' жє тоу єꙋаггєлѥ и ѱалтирь, росьскꙑми писмєнь писано, и шловѣка ѡбрѣть глаголѩца тоѩ бєсѣдоѩ и бєсѣдовавь съ нимь и силоу рѣши приѥмь, своѥи бєсѣдѣ прикладаѥ, разлишни писмєнь, глааснаа и съгласнаꙗ и къ богꙋ молитвꙋ дръжє и въскорѣ нашєть шисти и сказати, и мнѡзи сє ѥмоу дивлꙗ сє бога хвалєцє.

"And he found there the Evangel and Psalter written with Russian letters, and upon finding a man who spoke the language, talked with him; and perceiving the power of the speech, he added various letters for his own language, consonant vocal sounds; and praying to God, immediately began to compose and reveal, and many marvelled at him, glorifying God."

The phrase "росьскꙑми писмєнь" (often translated as "Russian letters") in Vita Constantini is another enigmatic statement that has puzzled Slavists for a long time. This chronicle of the life of St. Cyril and the first Slavic hagiography describes his early mission to the Khazars in southern Crimea. There, in Cherson, he discovered a gospel text and psalter written in "Russian letters."

Although Crimea circa 860 was probably a multiethnic community (especially its main port city, Cherson), it is considered unlikely that Slavs had yet settled there, as the Slavs of the Southern Dnieper region were at that time still separated from the northern shores of the Black Sea and the Sea of Azov by the steppe, which was controlled by Khazars and later Pechenegs, who remained heathens until long after the conversion of the Rus' in 966. For this reason, scholars generally reject the connection of "росьскꙑми" in Vita Constantini with Eastern Slavs, although some Russian nationalists do maintain that St. Cyril found an Old East Slavic text and encountered a man who spoke that language.

Birnbaum (1999) argues it is highly unlikely St. Cyril would have been as concerned as Chapter XIV of Vita Constantini records about the need to develop a writing systems for the Slavs of Moravia had he earlier encountered a Slavic script in Crimea.

According to the hypothesis originally propounded by French Slavist André Vaillant and further developed by Roman Jakobson, Dietrich Gerhardt, Karel Horálek, Robert Auty, Horace G. Lunt, and others, росьскꙑми was the result of a flopping of consonants by a later Slavic scribe with the original word being сорьскꙑми or Syriac and referring to the Aramaic language. Given the likely presence of Aramaic-speaking merchants and Syrian Christian refugees in Crimea, especially the port city of Cherson, at the time, this Syriac hypothesis remains the dominant belief.

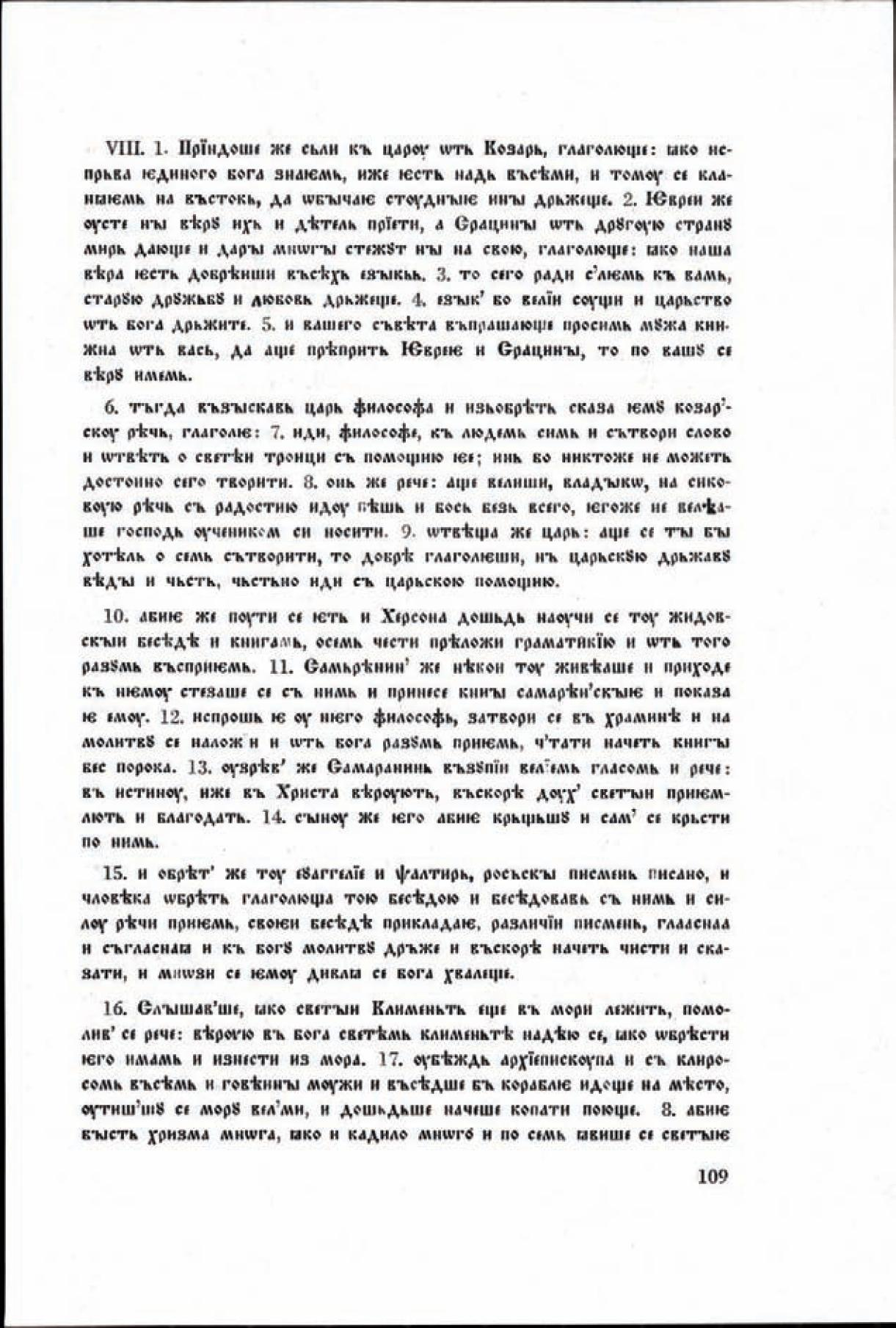
Vita Constantini, VIII, 1–18, containing the controversial excerpt.

According to an alternate theory, "росьскꙑми" may refer to Gothic with the author of Vita Constantini confusing one Old Germanic language (Gothic) with another (Early Old Swedish), the language of Varangians, who were referred to in contemporary Slavic and Byzantine Greek sources as "Рѹсь" or "Ῥῶς" (Rus'). This theory was advocated by Czech-American Slavist Francis Dvornik and Polish Slavist Tadeusz Lehr-Spławiński. The chief argument is that Goths were Christianized as early as the 4th Century by the mission of the bishop Wulfila, and a Gothic presence remained in the Crimea as late as the 16th Century (cf. Crimean Gothic). The chief argument against this theory is that a medieval copyist would have been unlikely to confuse the language of the notoriously pagan Varangians for that of Christian-Arian Goths of the Balkans.

Harvey Goldblatt suggested another radical reinterpretation in his essay On the 'rous'kymi pismeniy' in the 'Vita Constantini' and Rus'ian Religious Patriotism. Goldblatt noted that the majority of preserved codices containing Vita Constantini are East Slavic (Goldblatt counted app. 40) and read "росьскꙑми писмєнь" but the numerically fewer South Slavic manuscripts read "роушьскꙑми," "рошьскꙑми," and "роськꙑ" (or corrupted forms that can be derived from it). Given that the earliest attestation for Viti Constantini is from the 15th Century, it cannot be assumed, according to Goldblatt, that they all reflect one uniform and complete text tradition, supposedly written in Moravia before 882. Glodblatt points to the oldest version of the Russian Church Slavonic text Сказания о русской грамоте (The Story of Russian Writing), which was recorded immediately following a version of Vita Constantini. While not presuming a direct relationship between the texts, notes that the Сказания ties the Vita Constantini directly to the Russia-centered ideology of the 15th Century "Rus'ian lands," after the defeat of the Serbs at the Battle of Kosovo in 1389 and the fall of Tarnovo, the Bulgarian capital, in 1393. With the loss of Constantinople to Muslim Ottoman Turks in 1453, there was a desire to see the transfer of religious and cultural power from the Greek Orthodox-influenced Byzantine and the Slavic Balkans to Muscovy. The notion of Cyril discovering "Russian letters" in Cherson or that he would have studied with a "Russian" in the Crimea would therefore be welcomed in 15th Century Muscovy, reinforcing the image of Moscow as the center of the true Orthodox faith.

An alternate theory by the Greek Slavist Tachiaos (1993–1994) emphasizes the lack of textual support for the Syriac hypothesis; no existing version of the Vita Constantini actually includes the allegedly correct reading of сорьскꙑми. To accept the Syriac theory, Tachiaos argues, one must assume that the sour- to rous- (sur- to rus-) metathesis must have occurred very early to have been repeated in all extant manuscripts. Instead, Tachiaos claims that the Old Church Slavonic verbs обрѣт' and сказати were used with the specialized meaning of "to receive" and "to interpret, teach, preach," and the text refers to Slavic translations prepared ahead of St. Cyril's mission to Crimea. Thus the described Cherson episode means St. Cyril "received" a Slavonic gospel text and a psalter and a met a man who understood the language and soon began to read the gospel and preach it.

A final theory proposed by Vernadsky (1959) notes that Rus' strongholds likely existed in Crimea during the 9th century, arguing that some settlements likely existed in the older period of merger of Rus' and Alanic tribes. A troop of Rus' reportedly settled in Crimea as early as the late 8th century, following the siege of Surož around 790. The Life of St. Stefan of Surož (Žitie Stefana ispovednika, ep. Surožskago) reports the subsequent conversion some Rus' knyaz who led the siege to Christianity. Religious rites in the region were conducted in Byzantine Greek and Gothic, depending on the locality, but it is possible Rus' settlers also founded their own churches using their language for liturgical ceremonies. Therefore, St Cyril may have encountered a remnant text from these rites. As far as the alphabet is concerned, Vernadsky argues that росьскꙑми could be a borrowing from an Indo-Iranian language — Old Indic rocá (shining, radiant), rúci (light, lustre), Avestan raočah- (light, esp. heavenly), or Old Indic rukṣa- or Avestan raoxšna (radiant) — indicating an "enlightened" or "inspired" alphabet.

None of these proposed theories are flawless or free of heavy criticism, and none enjoy widespread acceptance among Slavists. Thus, as Birnbaum (1999) concludes, "This therefore is one of the remaining controversial issues of the Cyrillo–Methodian research today as much as ever".
