= Ohrid epistolary =

12th-century Glagolitic manuscript

Ohrid Epistolary
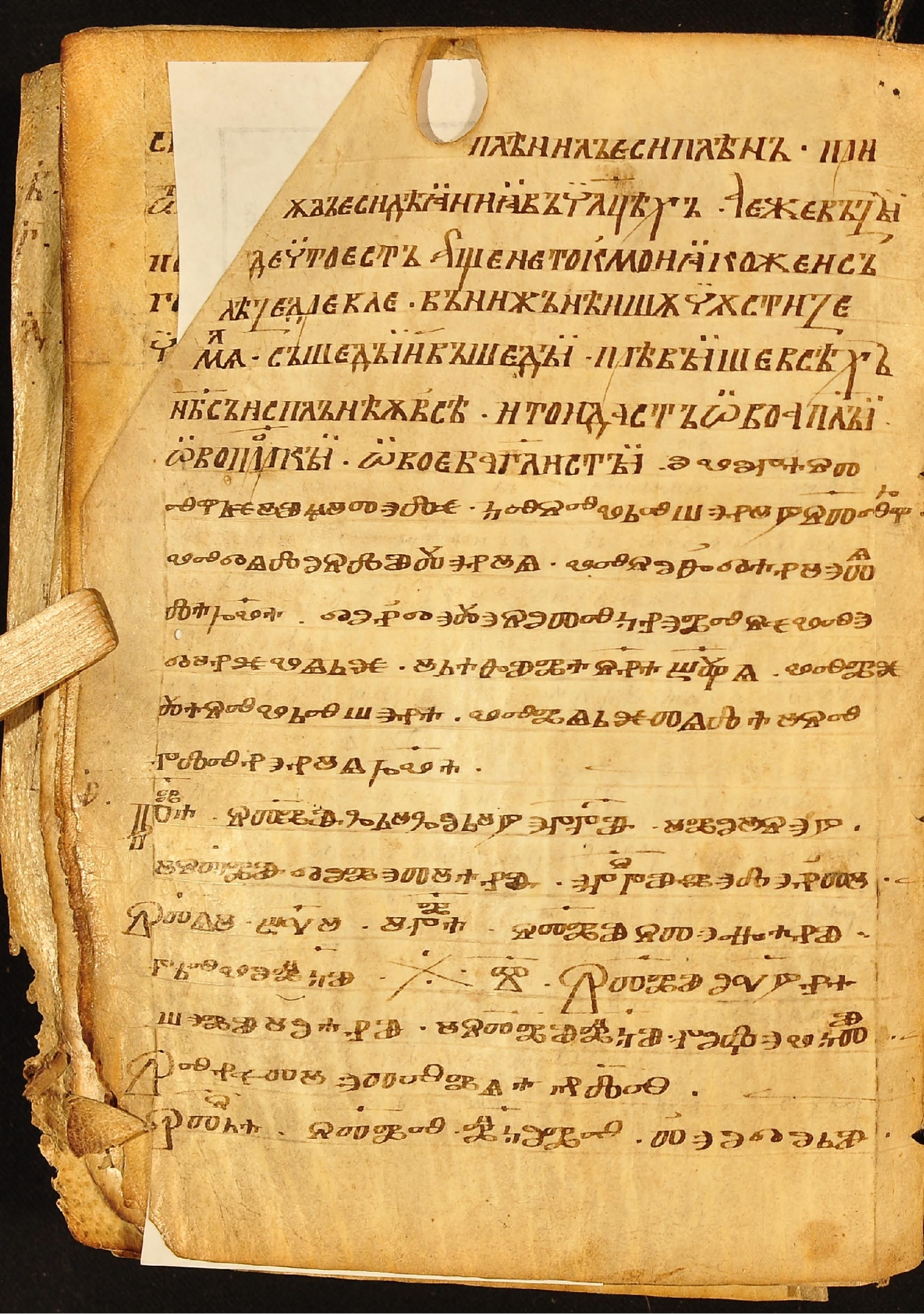
- Page of the manuscript
- Writing: Glagolitic
- Created: Late 1100s
- Discovered: 1845; Ohrid Cathedral Church of St. Clement, Ohrid, North Macedonia
- Discovered by: Victor Grigorovich
- Present location: Russian State Library
- Identification: F. 87. No. 13
- Language: Middle Bulgarian, Old Church Slavonic

The Ohrid epistolary is a Middle Bulgarian Glagolitic manuscript from the late 12th or early 13th century, from the Ohrid Literary School.

== History ==
According to the majority of scholarly consensus, it was written sometime in the 12th century, but Russian historian Anatoly Turilov dates it between 1225 and 1227, during the reign of Archbishop Demetrios Chromatenos. There are 112 leaves of parchment, and it was written in Cyrillic, with Glagolitic entries by a chief scholar and several assistant writers.

In 1845, the manuscript was discovered by Victor Grigorovich in the Ohrid Church of St. Mary Peribleptos in Macedonia, and was named the Ohrid Apostle. It is kept in the Russian State Library.

== Description ==
It is a short elective Apostle with excerpts from apostolic acts and epistles intended for reading during services. At the end, there is a church calendar with Slavic month names.

The manuscript was most likely written in Western Macedonia, presumably in the vicinity of Ohrid, as it contains features characteristic of the local dialect, such as: vocalization of the hard yer in a strong position in o, such as vsĕmъ, zam. sъ vьsĕmъ, vo snĕ, zam. vъ sъnĕ, sobrany, and zam. sъbьrany.

== See also ==
- List of Glagolitic manuscripts (900–1199)
- Lists of Glagolitic manuscripts

== Sources ==
- Кульбакин, Степан М. (1907). Охридская рукопись Апостола конца XII века (in Bulgarian). Vol. 3. Sofia: Sofiia Bulgarska akademiia na naukite.
- Мирчев, К. (1966). Към езиковата характеристика на Охридския апостол от XII век. – В: Климент Охридски: сборник от статии по случай 1050 години от смъртта му (in Bulgarian). Sofia. pp. 107–120.
- ТУРИЛОВ, А. А. (2008). "ЕЩЕ ОДИН СЛЕД ГЛАГОЛИЦЫ В МЕСЯЦЕСЛОВЕ ОХРИДСКОГО АПОСТОЛА (К ОБЪЯСНЕНИЮ ЧТЕНИЯ "ГОДЪПЕЩИ")". SLOVO (56–57). Moscow: 571–577 – via srce.hr.
- "Н. Овчаров, Проучвания върху средновековието и по-новата история на Вардарска Македония – 1". macedonia.kroraina.com.
