= Bitola triodion =

12th-century Glagolitic manuscript

Bitola Triodion
- Битолски триод
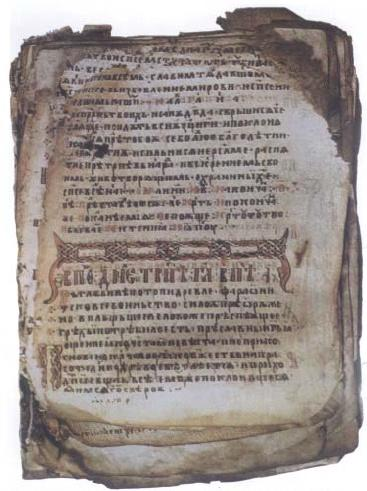
- Fragment of the tridion
- Size: 27.5 x 19.5 cm
- Writing: Glagolitic, Cyrillic
- Created: 12th century
- Discovered: 1907; Bitola
- Discovered by: Yordan Ivanov
- Present location: Bulgarian Academy of Sciences, Sofia, Bulgaria
- Identification: X. No. 38
- Language: Middle Bulgarian

The Bitola Triodion is a Middle Bulgarian Glagolitic manuscript that contains a triodion from the late 12th century.

== History ==
In 1898, the manuscript was brought to the Bulgarian Trade Agency in Bitola from a nearby village, along with other Slavic and Greek manuscripts. Historian Yordan Ivanov found it in Bitola in 1907. It is now kept in the library of the Bulgarian Academy of Sciences in Sofia.

== Description ==
The triodion contains 101 leaves of parchment, each sized to 27.5 x 19.5 cm. According to Ivanov, it was written in the village of Svetovrache by Georgi Gramatik. Along with usual service prayers, it contains a hymographic cycle of Konstantin of Preslav. It is written in Cyrillic with traces of Glagolitic, which is considered to be a characteristic feature of manuscripts from the Bulgarian region.

Some scholars assume that it is a direct copy of an older, Glagolitic book. The document contains musical notation, and a frequent use of the self-theta (Θ), which is written in black and red ink. The sign is placed above individual words to inform singers of musical ornamentation.

== See also ==
- List of Glagolitic manuscripts (900–1199)
- Lists of Glagolitic manuscripts

== Sources ==
- Ивановъ, Йорданъ (1931). Български старини изъ Македония. Второ, допълнено издание. Sofia: Издава Българската академия на наукитѣ, Държавна печатница. pp. 452–467.
- Zaimiov, Iordan (Nov 1984). "The Kičevo Triodium (Cod. Sofia, BAN, 38), also known as the Bitola Triodium: An Old Bulgarian Manuscript from the XI-XII Century. Text in Transcription". Polata Knigopisnaia (10–11). William R. Veder, Vakgroep Slavistiek, Katholieke Universiteit: 1–202. hdl:1811/52965. ISSN 0165-1862 – via OSU.
- Русек, Й. (May 1981). "За езика на Битолския триод". Старобългаристика (in Bulgarian) (2): 72–78.
- Петканова, Д. (1983). "Константин Кирил – Денница на славянския род". Народна Просвета.
- Петров, С.; Кодов, Х. (1973). Старобългарски музикални паметници (in Bulgarian). Sofia. pp. 121–127.
- Добрев, Иван (1991). "За една приписка в Битолския триод". Старобългарска литература (25–26): 110–114.
