= Bojana Palimpsest =

Old Church Slavonic manuscript

- Боянское Евангелие
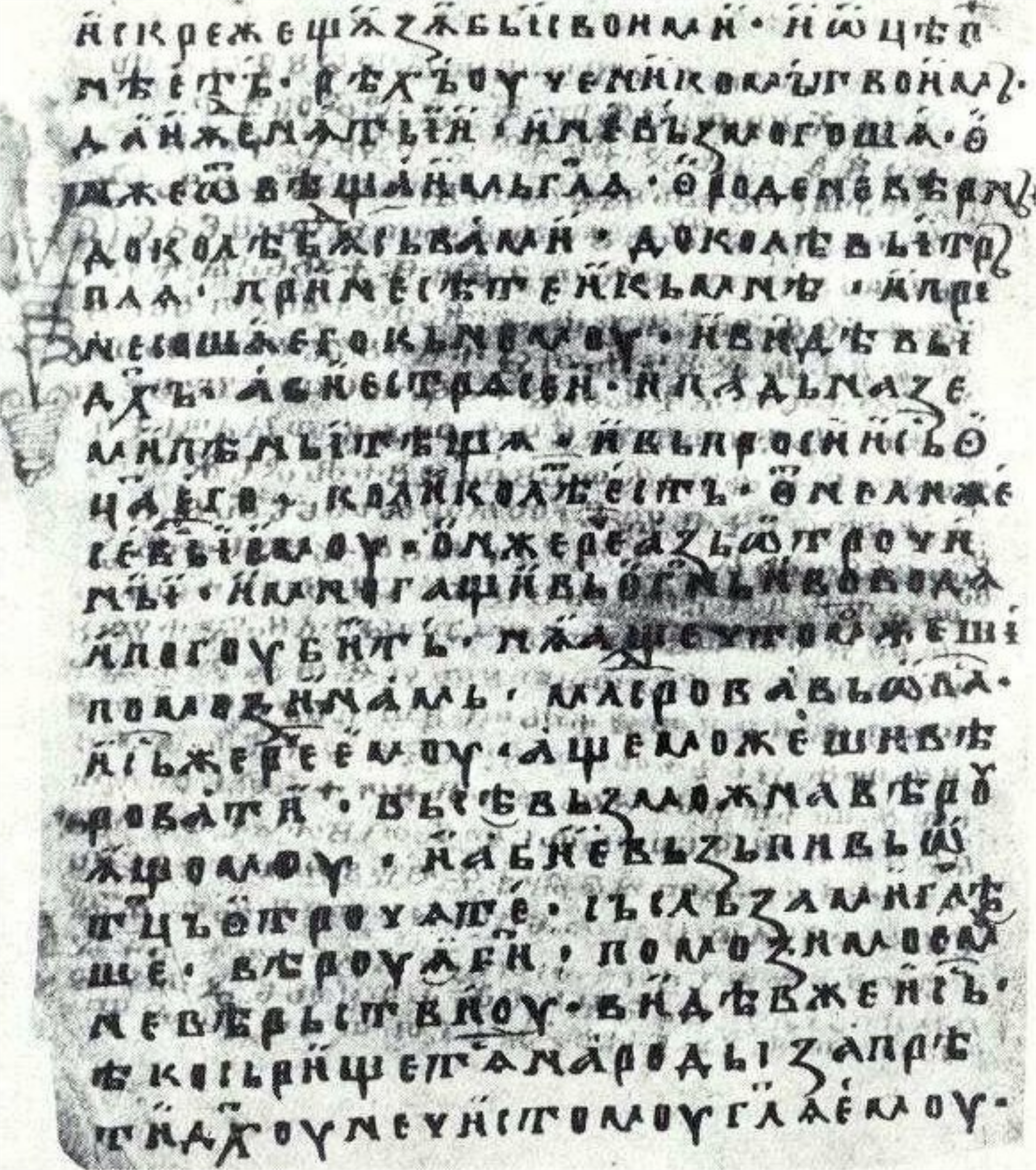
- Page of the manuscript
- Size: 16 x 18 cm
- Created: 1036-1044
- Discovered: 1840s Bulgaria
- Discovered by: Viktor Grigorovich
- Present location: Russian State Library
- Identification: F. 87 No. 8 / M. 1690
- Language: Old Bulgarian, Old Church Slavonic

The Bojana Palimpsest or Bojana Gospel (Russian: Боянское Евангелие) is an 11th-century Old Church Slavonic manuscript, originally written in a Glagolitic manuscript. In the 13th century, the Glagolitic text was removed, and the parchment was reused to write a Cyrillic gospel.

== History ==
The manuscript was discovered by historian Viktor Grigorovich during his research in the Balkans during the mid-1840s. It is currently stored in the Russian State Library in Moscow.

The Boljana Palimpsest should not be confused with a similar-natured Cyrillic manuscript that was discovered during restoration work in the Bojana Church in 1981, and is known as the Bojana Psalter.

== Description ==
In modern times, surviving parts of the manuscript include 84 leaves measuring 16 x 18 cm. The parchment tetrads are not sewn together, and are separate, and the first 8 pages of the text are missing, and neither are the last 8. In the form that the gospel had in the 15th century, it probably contained 13 tetrads with 28 leaves each. The manuscript includes the Synaxarium, a hagiographic compilation, and the Menaion, a set of propers for the Orthodox calendar. The initial letters of the text are painted on with cinnabar pigment.

== Linguistic features ==
The original text belongs to the late Glagolitic written documents, as it lacks the soft sign. The only other preserved text is an inserted part of the Zograf Gospel. According to Slavic historian Ivan Dobrev, the text is a sign that at the end of the 11th century, attempts were made to reform the spelling in the direction of approaching the vernacular. He states that the text was most likely written in Western Bulgaria.

== See also ==
- List of Glagolitic manuscripts (900–1199)
- Lists of Glagolitic manuscripts

== Sources ==
- Григорович, В. (1848). Очерк путешествия по Европейской Турции [Essay on travel in European Turkey] (PDF) (in Russian). Kazan. p. 189. Archived from the original (PDF) on 2018-04-11.
- Кульбакин, Степан. Материалы для характеристики среднеболгарского языка". 1. Боянское евангелие XII-XIII в. [Materials for the characterization of the Central Bulgarian language". 1. Boyan Gospel of the XII-XIII centuries] (in Bulgarian).
- Ягич, И.В. (1911). Энцикопедия славянской филологии [Encyclopedia of Slavonic Philology] (in Russian) (3 ed.). pp. 129, 233, 234.
- Dobrev, Ivan (1972). Глаголическият текст на Боянския палимпсест. Старобългарски паметник от края на XI в. [The Glagolitic Text of the Boyana Palimpsest. Old Bulgarian monument from the end of the XI century] (in Bulgarian).
- Slavona, Tatyana (2003). "Боянско евангелие". Старобългарска литература. Енцикопедичен речник [Old Bulgarian Literature. Encyclopedic Dictionary] (in Bulgarian). pp. 67–68.
