= List of Glagolitic manuscripts (900–1199) =

This is a list of manuscripts featuring the Glagolitic script from the 10th to 12th centuries.

Light red represents manuscripts with Glagolitic only in inclusions or paratext.
Pale red represents mixed manuscripts with Glagolitic as a main script.

== 900–999 ==
Type	Abbreviation	Date	Designation	Library	Place of origin	Folia	Dimensions	Columns and rows	Notes	Scans
missal	Fg(Mi)Kij	925–935, 1081–1096	F. 301 No. 328P	Vernadsky National Library of Ukraine	Dalmatia, Czech Republic?	13	14.7 × 10.7 cm	1 co	Kiev Folia (Kyiv Folia, Kijevski listići, Kiever Blätter). The first page has a different and younger origin from the rest: it is Croatian, while the rest is Czech according to some. Abecedary from 1872 by Andrej Antoninъ Kapustinъ prepended to manuscript for several facsimile editions. FgKij-C by same scribe as PsDim-X and MSin-B. It is FgKij-A and FgKij-B that are dated to 925–935. Written on cow or goat parchment. Transcriptions at TITUS, Manuskript, Staroslavenski institut. Bibliography:	WM, WDL, KiSt, 1983, SEK, IzSt (2009 from Hamm 1979), GHR (from Jagić 1890)
aprakos gospel	FgAch	966–981	Cod. 1/2 (532)	Odesa National Scientific Library	Bulgaria	2	17 × 20 cm	1 co	Ohrid Glagolitic fragments (Evangelium Achridanum). A photocopy made 29 April 1959 is housed at the Staroslavenski institut in Zagreb (F 5). Bibliography: Discovered 1845 in Ohrid by Viktor Grigorovič. Possibly written by one of the hands of the Sinai Psalter. Facsimile published in Ilinskiy 1915.	Kodeks, BFr
parenesis	FgRil, FgMac	985–1006	фонд И. И. Срезневского 24.4.15, Rila No. 3/6	Rila Monastery, Library of the Russian Academy of Sciences	Bulgaria	11	27.5 × 21.3 cm	2 co	Rila fragments (Rilski listići i ostrišci). Facsimile of one folio published by Ilĭinskiy 1909 (BRF). First full facsimile of all folia in Goshev 1956 "Рилски глаголически листове". Some images hosted at SESDiva. Rila fragments (FgRil) include Macedonian Glagolitic Folium (FgMac), being by same scribe, who potentially also wrote FgGri.	scan of RAN part, SEK
aprakos gospel	Ass	986–1006, 1063–1077	Vat. Slav. 3	Vatican Library	Macedonia			2 co	Codex Assemanius. Hand Ass-2 is dated 1046–1081, in contrast to the earlier parts. At the end of the codex there are mentions of saints Cyril, Methodius, Demetii, Theodosius and Clement of Ohrid. Transcriptions at TITUS, CCMH. Facsimile by Vajs and Kurz published 1929 and 1955. Bibliography:	DVL, SEK, 1865
fourfold gospel	Zog	987–1006, 1046–1081	MS. Glag. 1 +	National Library of Russia	Macedonia	271+17		1 co	Codex Zographensis. Folios 41-57 are a palimpsest of an earlier Glagolitic manuscript, part of whose text was published in Cyrillic transcription by Dobrev 1971. Partial facsimile in Jagić 1879, reprinted Graz 1954. Hand Zog-2 is dated 1046–1081, in contrast to the earlier parts. Transcription at TITUS, CCMH. Bibliography:	NLR, SEK, IzSt, IzSt
homiliary	HomCloz	996–1017	Trento ms. 2476 (ff. 1–2, 5–12) + Inssbruk Dip. 973 (ff. 3–4)	Municipal Library of Trento, Tyrolean State Museum	Macedonia, Croatia	14	27 × 20,5 cm	1 co	Cloz Miscellany (Glagolita Clozianus, Kločev glagoljaš, Клоцов сборник). Acquired by Ivan Frankopan (died 1486). Today 12 folia in Trento, 1 dolia in Innsbruck. Facsimile and additions published in Zum Glagolita Clozianus 1836 by Jernej Kopitar, then 1860 by Franz Miklosich (WM). Bibliography:	NSK, GHR, USI, SEK, IzSt (Innsbruk: 2008), IzSt (Trento: 2009)

== 1000–1099 ==
Type	Abbreviation	Date	Designation	Library	Place of origin	Folia	Dimensions	Columns and rows	Notes	Scans
aprakos gospel	VatPal	1000s (original)	Vat.gr.2502	Vatican Library	Bulgaria	112		1 co	Palimpsest with Greek over Cyrillic. Glagolitic in margins in 4 places (i.e. f. 10v, 22v, 111v). Discovered 1981. Facsimile published 2002. The Vatican library has not yet digitised it. Originally reported to date to the 10th century, the date has been revised to probably after Codex Suprasliensis. Bibliography:	
	FgGri	1006–1025	РАН, Спб., фонд И. И. Срезневского 24.4.17	Library of the Russian Academy of Sciences		2			Grigorovič Folium (Лист Григоровича). Sometimes argued to have originated in the same document as the Rila Fragments. Bibliography:	
	FgPrag₁ (PF)	1006–1035	?	St. Vitus Cathedral	Czech Republic			1 co	Prague Fragments. PF-B dated to 1006–1010, PF-A to 1006–1023. Discovered 1855. Text at TITUS. Bibliography:	IA, 1857
psalter	PsSin	1010–1018	Sin. slav. 38/O (177 f.) + 2/N (32 f.)	Saint Catherine's Monastery	Macedonia	209		1 co	Sinai Psalter (Psalterium Sinaiticum, Синайски псалтир). There is an 1883 transcription in Cyrillic. PsSin-A, PsSin-A1, PsSin-B, PsSin-B1, PsSin-B2, PsSin-B3, PsSin-C, PsSin-C1, PsSin-C2, PsSin-D, PsSin-E dated to 1010–1018. A facsimile was published 1971, and transcriptions have also been published. Bibliography:	LoC, BAN, SEK
fourfold gospel	Mar	1012–1039	F.87 No. 6 (172 f.) + Cod. slav. 146 (Wiener fragmente 2 f.)	Russian State Library, Austrian National Library	Macedonia	174		1 co	Codex Marianus. Two folia acquired by Antun Mihanović, who sent them to Franc Miklošič in Vienna, who published them in 1850. Most of the codex was discovered by Viktor Grigorovič in 1844–1845 on Athos in the skete "Sv. Bogorodica". Entered Russian State Library with Grigorovič archive. Transcription by Jagić 1883, reprinted Graz 1960. Text at TITUS, CCMH. Bibliography:	STSL, ÖNB, IA, SEK
euchologion	Eu (EuSin Euch, EuchSin), SlužSin	1014–1031	glag. 2+3 + Sin. slav. 1/N	National Library of Russia, Saint Catherine's Monastery	Macedonia, Croatia	14	27 x 20,5 cm	1 co	Sinai Euchologium (Euchologium Sinaiticum, Евхологий синайский). By same scribe as MSin-A and maybe SlužSin (the latter being the Euchology fragment, not the Euchologium Sinaiticum, dated to 1014–1031). A facsimile was published 1941 and 1988, and there is an 1882 transcription in Cyrillic. Bibliography:	LoC, SEK
sacramentary	MSin (MissSin)	1026–1118	5/N	Saint Catherine's Monastery		80			Sinai Missal (Sacramentarium (Missale) Sinaiticum). Austrian Science Fund grant number P19608-G12 included scanning the manuscript. SMDL also to digitise it. MSin-A by same scribe as EuSin, but MSin-B by same scribe as PsDim-X and FgKij-C. MSin-A dated to 1026–1031, MsSin-C to 1046–1081, MsSin-B to 1106–1118. Bibliography:	
aprakos gospel	Boj (BojPal)	1036–1044	F. 87 No. 8 / M. 1690	Russian State Library	Bulgaria	42			Bojana palimpsest (Боянски палимпсест). Cyrillic over Glagolitic. 26 pages have Glagolitic. Discovered by Viktor Grigorovič in the Boyan church near Sofia in 1945. Bibliography:	STSL, SEK
psalter, medical	PsDim (PsDem), FgMed (MedFol)	1046–1056, 1058–1066, 1094–1106	Sin. slav. 3/N	Saint Catherine's Monastery	Mount Sinai	209		1 co	The psalter of Dimitri the Ol'tar'nik, Medical Folia. PsDim-X by same scribe as FgKij-C and MSin-B. PsDim has hands PsDem-A, PsDem-B, PsDem-C all dated 1058–1066, and PsDem-X dated 1094–1106. Transcriptions at Manuskript of Dimitri's and Medical. Facsimile by Miklas 2012. Bibliography:	IA
menaion	MenSin	1081–1086	Sin. slav. 4/N	Saint Catherine's Monastery		2			Sinai Menaion (Tropologium Sinaiticum). Contains the small menaion. Bibliography:	
psalter	PsEug	1000s	Погод. 24.5.7	BRAN-Sankt Peterburg, RNB-Sankt Peterburg	Russia	20			Evgeniev psalter (Eвгениевски псалтир). Psalter with commentary of Pseudo-Athanasius. Cyrillic with 3 Glagolitic initials (folia 6r, 18r, 20r).	NLR
Orations of Gregory of Nazianzus		1000s	Q.п.I.16.	RNB-Sankt-Peterburg	Russia	377			Orations (13) of Gregory of Nazianzus. Cyrillic with several instances of Glagolitic letters Azъ, I, Jerъ.	NLR
epistolary	Enin	1000s (latter half)	MS No. 1144	SS. Cyril and Methodius National Library	Bulgaria	39		1 co	Enina apostle (Енински апостол). In Cyrillic but with two examples of Glagolitic initial Buky among other Glagolitic letters. PF-B dated to 1006–1010, PF-A to 1006–1023. Facsimile published 1983. Text at TITUS. Bibliography:	NBKM, SEK
triodion	TrRes	1000s (late)	X. No. 37	Bulgarian Academy of Sciences	Macedonia	1	24 x 17 cm	1 co	Resen (Dragoslav) fragment (Триод на Кодов). Cyrillic palimpsest of Cyrillic with one Glagolitic note, not on the palimpsest but the over-text. Notes are often mixed Cyrillic and Glagolitic (i.e. 38 f133v, see 2/N f31v). Discovered by Hristo Kodov in Gabrovo in 1963. Bibliography:	1969 [low res.]
		1000s/1100s		Saint Petersburg (Библиотека Академии наук)		1			Ohrid Cyrillic Folio (Macedonian Cyrillic Folio, Македонский кириллический листок). Cyrillic with Glagolitic ⱓ. Bibliography:	SEK, WM
Life of Simeon Stylites	FgBud	1000s/1100s	MS Duod. Eccl. Slav. 2 (or Vet. Slav. Duod. 2)	National Széchényi Library (Országos Széchényi Könyvtár)	Croatia (probably)	1		1 co	Budapest fragments (Budimpeštanski odlomci). 2 fragments. The only Croato-glagolitic text that still distinguishes between the two half-vowels. 1955 facsimile requires academic access, and consists of black and white scans and this colour page. 2005 transcription by Ralph Cleminson. Contains part of the Macarius-legend according to Anica Nazor. Black and white photocopy made around 1980–1985 (Star. inst. F 270). Bibliography:	IzSt (2008)
menaion		1000s/1100s	ф. 381 (Sinodalna collection) No 110	RGADA-Moskva	Russian	110			Служевен миней за април. Mixed Cyrillic-Glagolitic paratext of copyist Lavrentij on folio 104r.	
rule		1000s/1100s	K-5349	Държавна Третяковска галерия	Russia	126			Studite rule (Типографски устав). Glagolitic note on folio 124r in hand of Mikula.	
abecedary		1000s (second half) / 1100s	CLM 14485 (Clm. 13; 485)	Munich (Bayerische Staatsbibliothek)	Eastern German lands				Munich abecedary. In 11th century Latin manuscript of Carmina Hroswitae with Glagolitic and Cyrillic abecedaries on f. 150v. Facsimiles in 1930 and 2007. Bibliography:	BSB

== 1100–1199 ==
Type	Abbreviation	Date	Designation	Library	Place of origin	Folia	Dimensions	Columns and rows	Notes	Scans
legal		1100 (January 1)			Dobrinj				Donation of Dragoslav. Transcription of translation of Petar Petriš published by Ivan Črnčić in "Katolički list" 1860, br. 29. Original lost, survives only in 1724 translation by Petriš of Latin translation by Benetto Grabbia (fl. 1570–1580) with the aid of parish priest Juraj Mavrović. Črnčić transcription transliterated into Glagolitic by Kukuljević. Bibliography:	
missal (sacramentarium)	Fg(Mi)Vnd	1146–1156	Cod. Slav. 136	Austrian National Library		4	12 x 9,5 cm	1 co	Vienna Folia (Bečki listići). Bibliography:	ÖNB, ÖNB, IzSt (2009)
abecedary		1100s							Abecenarium bulgaricum. Latin with Glagolitic abecedary. Housed at the National Library of France as Ms. lat. 2340. First mentioned in the 1744 catalogue, last used for Kopitar 1836, reported lost 1858. Confirmed lost in a 1910 investigation by Jagić. But letters published in the 1750 book Nouveau Traité de Diplomatique. Photocopy in Zagreb made 1981. Bibliography:	1750, 2020
fourfold gospel	Dob	1100s	NLR Q.п.I.55. (183 f.), Saint Catherine's Monastery Cod. slav. 43 (23 f.) and Cod. slav. 7/N (9 f.), Paris Cod. slav. 65 (2 f.)	National Library of Russia	Macedonia	217			Dobromir Gospel (Dobromirovo evanđelje). In Cyrillic but with one example of Glagolitic letter Ensь on 179a10. Facsimiles first in 1973 and then after. Bibliography:	NLR
epistolary	A☧ (AChr)	1100s	No 39 (291 f.), VIII.3 (8 f.)	Лвовски исторически музей, Централна научна библиотека на Украйна	Russia	299			Apostolus Christinopolitanus (Кристинопольський Апостол). Cyrillic with Glagolitic abecedaries and Glagolitic used functionally for commentary marking. Text published 1896, 1908, 1910. Bibliography:	IA [low res]
Book of Daniel		1100s	M. P. Pogodin collection 68 (ОР Погод. 68)	National Library of Russia		2	20.5 x 16 cm	4	Moscow Glagolitic Leaflets (Московские глаголические листки). Commentary of Hippolytus on the Book of Daniel. Cyrillic with Glagolitic on folio 2r-2v.	NLR
passional	FgBaš	1100s	Zbirka Glagolitica, G-197 (ZM30/19)	HDA	Croatia				Baška strips (Baščanski ostrišci, Premudini ostrišci). Two strips found by Vinko Premuda, lost for a time, then found again among the remains of J. Gusić. The fragments contain a portion of the Gospel of Matthew. Facsimile published in Vajs 1910 (IA). Bibliography:	WP, IzSt (2009)
lectionary	FgGrš	1100s	Fragm. glag. 2	Arhiv HAZU	Bosnia and Herzegovina or Montenegro	4	21.7-22.7 x 15.5 cm	1 co	Gršković apostle fragment (Grškovićev odlomak apostola). Found at the end of the 19th century by chaplain Niko Gršković in Vrbnik. Cyrillic marginal notes. Text includes Acts of the Apostles. Includes Cyrillic marginal notes in a younger hand. Reproduced by Jagić 1893. Photograph of one page published in Štefanić 1970. Bibliography: s	IzSt (2008), IzSt (2008)
epistolary	FgMih	1100s	Fragm. glag. 1	Arhiv HAZU	Bosnia and Herzegovina or Montenegro	2	24 x 18.5 cm	2 co 31 ro	Mihanović apostle fragment (Mihanovićev odlomak apostola). Found inside a Cyrillic 1262 nomocanon. Photograph of one page published in Štefanić 1970. Bibliography:	IzSt (2008), IzSt (2008)
festal menaion		1100s	19	Jerusalem Patriarchal Library	Serbia	200			Jerusalem palimpsest (Йерусалимски палимпсест). A 13th century Cyrillic Gospel written over a 12th-century Festal Menaion, also Cyrillic but with 2 Glagolitic words on f. 80r21.	
epistolary	ApAch	1100s (late)	F. 87. No. 13	Russian State Library	Macedonia	112		1 co	Ohrid Apostle. Bigger part with Cyrillic and smaller part with Glagolitic (folia 13v, 14r, 99v, separate letters and words throughout manuscript). Bibliography:	STSL, SEK
triodion	TrBit	1100s (late)	X. No. 38	Bulgarian Academy of Sciences	Macedonia	101	27.5 x 19.5 cm	1 co	Kičevo (Bitola) triodion (Битолски триод). Bigger part with Cyrillic and smaller part with Glagolitic. Transcription in Zaimov 1984 (OSU).	
