= Damaskin =

Chronicle of church-liturgical books

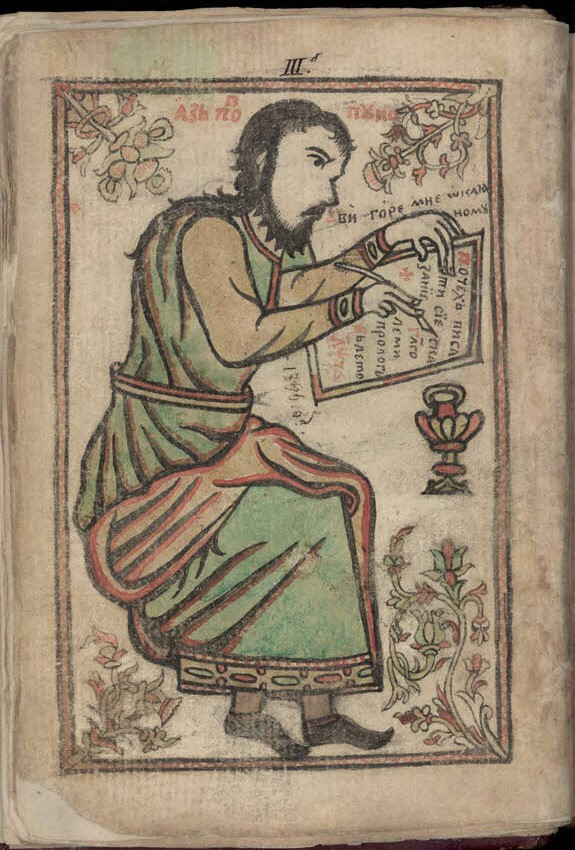
Miscellany (Puncho)

Damaskin (Bulgarian: Дамаскин) is a chronicle of church-liturgical books. Later, the damaskins became church collections with teaching words and lives. They appeared at the end of the 16th century in the western Bulgarian lands and existed until the middle of the 19th century. For the most part, the damaskins were written in a simple, accessible language for ordinary people.

Typically, damask is a type of decoration on a metal or leather handicraft whose etymology originates in the city of Damascus.

The name "damaskin" comes from the name of the first author of such a book - the Greek writer of the 16th century Damaskinos Stouditis, whose work "Thesauros" (Θησαυρός; 1558) contains 36 lives and teachings (printed in Venice). It was first translated into Bulgarian by Bishop Gregory Prilepski in the Holy Trinity skete at the Great Lavra Monastery in Athos. The first damaskins included only translations of Damaskinos Stouditis' works, and later, after the middle of the 17th century, they were combined with translations of works by other authors. In the 18th century, part of the damaskins were out of church practice and often turned into readable collections. The damaskins are written in an accessible, spoken vernacular and have a fascinating way of exhibiting. They contain works of different genre and with different themes - of modern Greek authors, ancient Bulgarian ones, different lives, teachings, apocrypha, historical works, religious stories, stories, aphorisms and others.

The damaskins marks the transition from Middle Bulgarian to New Bulgarian, which was standardized in the 19th century. The transition to analytical Bulgarian is also noted. Until the 16th century, the Middle Bulgarian was one of the four literary languages of the Ottoman Sultan's office. After that, from the 17th century it developed on a popular basis, and from the 18th century it gained Russian influence over the Bulgarian language through literature after the reforms of Peter the Great.
