= Rila fragments =

10th-century Glagolitic manuscript

- Рыльские глаголические листки
- Fragment of the manuscript
- Size: 27.5 x 21.3 cm
- Created: 985-1006
- Discovered: 1845; Rila Monastery
- Discovered by: Viktor Grigorovich
- Present location: Russian Academy of Sciences, Rila Monastery
- Identification: фонд И. И. Срезневского 24.4.15, Rila No. 3/6
- Language: Glagolitic script
- Partial scan of manuscript

The Rila fragments are a Glagolitic manuscript consisting of eight fragmentary parchment leaves and three fragments of a 10th-century Glagolitic Old Church Slavonic book.

The fragments' texts are part of Ephraim the Syrian's "Parenesis" (precepts). and from prayers read during Lent.

== History ==
The first two fragments were discovered in the Rila Monastery in 1845 by the Russian historian Viktor Grigorovich. Today, they are located in the library of the Russian Academy of Sciences in Saint Petersburg. The better preserved part of the manuscripts was published in 1909 under the name "Macedonian Glagolitic Leaf" by the Russian history Grigory Ilyinsky.

It is 27.5 x 21.3 cm in size and contains the end of the 78s Parenesis speech. In the 15th or 16th century, additional notation was added to the fields in a newer Cyrillic.

Three or more leaves were found in the Rila Monastery by Czech historian Konstantin Irechek in 1880 within the binding of Vladislav Gramatik's handwritten "Panegirik" from 1473. In 1936, Yordan Ivanov found additional fragments. The finds of Irechek and Yordanov are still kept in the Rila Monastery, rather than the RAS.

The so-called "Grigorovich's Leaf" (Russian Academy of Sciences, St. Petersburg, 24.4.17) is not counted among the Rila Glagolitic sheets by all scholars.

== See also ==
- List of Glagolitic manuscripts (900–1199)
- Lists of Glagolitic manuscripts

== Sources ==
- Срезневский, И. И. (1866). Древные глаголические памятники [Ancient Glagothic Monuments] (in Russian). Vol. 1. pp. 76–87.
- Гошев, Иван (1956). Рилски глаголически листове [Rila Glagolitic Sheets] (in Bulgarian). Sofia.
- Смядовски, С. (1988). Към въпроса за състава на Рилските глаголически листове [To the question of the composition of the Rila Glagolitic sheets] (in Bulgarian). Vol. 6?. pp. 500–501.
- Кузидова, Ирина. "РЪКОПИСИ ОТ СБИРКАТА НА РИЛСКИЯ МАНАСТИР" (PDF). slovo-aso.cl.bas.bg. p. 2.
