= Apostolus Christinopolitanus =

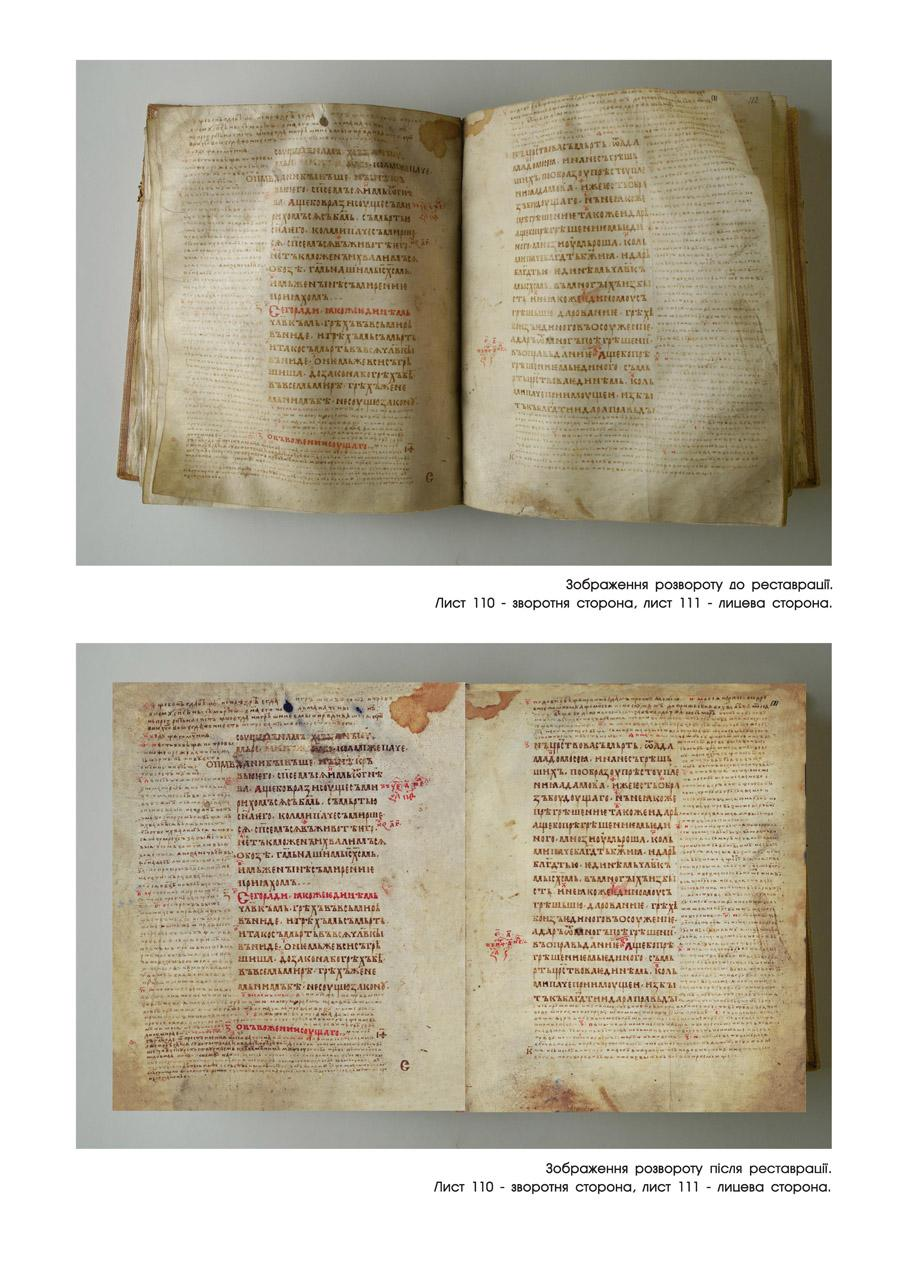
ff.110v–111r of the Apostolus Christinopolitanus, before and after the restoration of 2007–2008

The Apostolus Christinopolitanus is a Cyrillic manuscript of the Acts and Epistles with commentary, written in Church Slavonic of the East Slavonic recension in the middle of the twelfth century. It takes its name from the town of Krystynopol (now Sheptytskyi), where it was kept until 1908. The greater part of the manuscript (291 leaves), is now in the Historical Museum in Lviv (MS 39); eight leaves are in the National Library of Ukraine in Kyiv (MS VIII.3), and four more in the Czartoryski Library at the National Museum in Cracow (MS 11601). These last came to light only in 2020.

The manuscript in its present condition is incomplete, lacking Acts i 1 – ix 27, I Peter ii 11–25, I Timothy v 5 – vi 21, II Timothy i 1–9 and ii 5 – iv 22, and all of Titus and Philemon. Unusually, the Epistle to the Hebrews is placed between II Thessalonians and I Timothy. The epistles are accompanied by the prefaces and chapter-lists of the Euthalian Apparatus and by extensive commentary. The manuscript is very unusual in having the scriptural text occupying the central area of the page and the commentary in smaller writing in the wide margins surrounding it, an arrangement common in Greek manuscripts but almost unknown in the Slavonic tradition, where the text and commentary usually occupy the same central area.

The Apostolus Christinopolitanus was published in 1896 by Emil Kałużniacki, who however printed only the scriptural text (supplying the missing parts with text from other manuscripts) and omitted the commentary. After a thorough restoration of the manuscript, carried out in 2007 and 2008, a digital facsimile was made available in 2011 by the National Library.

The text of the Apostolus Christinopolitanus, in Kałużniacki's edition, was used as a source for Slavonic variants to the Greek New Testament in the United Bible Societies' edition, somewhat unfortunately, as the editors failed to notice that some of the variants actually come from the other manuscripts used by Kałużniacki, and because, despite the antiquity of the manuscript, the text is not a good witness to the earliest Slavonic version: in common with other manuscripts that include commentary, it "bears the marks of revision and subsequent influence from Greek manuscripts". The manuscript nevertheless has considerable linguistic and text-critical importance for the Slavonic version, particularly when the commentary is taken into account.

The manuscript uses Glagolitic functionally for commentary marking.

== See also ==
- List of Glagolitic manuscripts (900–1199)

== Literature ==
- Волощенко, архим. Методій (Станіслав), ed. (2023). Христинопільський Апостол ХІІ століття : Факсимільне видання та кодикологічне дослідження. Київ: Горобець. ISBN 978-966-2377-64-4.
- Bakshaeva, Alyona Andreevna (2020). "Записи на полях Христинопольского Апостола XII века" [Marginal inscriptions in the Apostolus Christinopolitanus from the Twelfth Century] (PDF). Славянский мир (in Russian) (2020): 158–161. doi:10.31168/2619-0869.2020.2.01. S2CID 235051183.
- Bobrik, Marina (2011). "Терминология библейской цитаты и толкования в рукописях Толкового Апостола XII – XVI веков". Библеистика. Славистика. Русистика: К 70-летию ... А. А. Алексеева: 387−398.
- Ugrinova-Skalovska, Radmila (1970). "Траги од глаголската писмена традиција во македонските кирилски текстови од 12 и 13 век" [Traces of the Glagolitic Literary Tradition in Macedonian Cyrillic Texts of the 12th and 13th Centuries] (PDF). Годишен зборник на Филозофскиот факултет (in Macedonian). 22: 571–580. ISSN 0350-1892.
- Maslov, Sergey Ivanovich (1910). "Отрывок Христинопольского апостола, принадлежащий библиотеке Университета св. Владимира". Известия ОРЯС (in Russian). 15 (4). Saint Petersburg: 229–269. Includes facsimile of MS VIII.3.
- Voskresenskiy, Grigoriy Aleksandrovich (1908). Древнеславянский Апостол [Old Slavonic Apostle] (in Russian).
- Kałużniacki, Emil (1896). Actus epistolaeque apostolorum palaeoslovenice [The Old Slavonic Acts and Epistles of the Apostles] (in Latin). Vienna.
