= Enina Apostle =

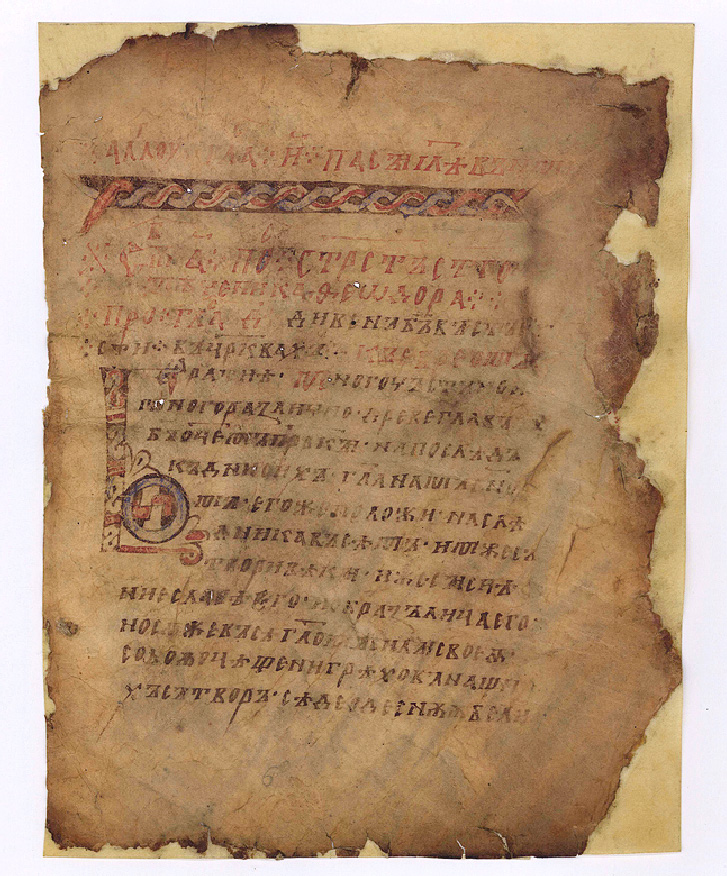
F.6r of the Enina Apostle, showing coloured headpiece and decorative initial.

The Enina Apostle or Enina Apostolos (scholarly abbreviation Enin) is an 11th-century Old Church Slavonic Cyrillic manuscript. Discovered in a poor condition in 1960 during restoration work in the central Bulgarian village of Enina, the partially preserved parchment manuscript is housed in the SS. Cyril and Methodius National Library in Sofia. It is the oldest Cyrillic manuscript currently held by any Bulgarian collection.

== History ==
The Enina Apostle was discovered in 1960 during the restoration of the old Church of Saint Paraskeva in the village of Enina. The village lies in south central Bulgaria, north of Kazanlăk, and is administratively part of Stara Zagora Province. The manuscript was initially in a very poor condition, with only 39 leaves and parts of leaves extant, and hardly a single leaf preserved in its entirety.

From its discovery to 1964 the Enina Apostle was housed in the Kazanlăk Museum. In 1964, the manuscript was transferred to the SS. Cyril and Methodius National Library in the capital Sofia, where it has been housed ever since as MS №1144. The Enina Apostle is part of the library′s collection of 1,500 Slavic manuscripts. Among these, it is of utmost importance because of its antiquity, as well as its palaeographic and linguistic features. In December 2010, a commemorative plaque dedicated to the Enina Apostle was installed in the courtyard of the Church of Saint Paraskeva in honour of the 50th anniversary of the manuscript′s discovery.

== Description ==
The Enina Apostle is a short Apostolos lectionary, written on parchment in the second half of the 11th century, which makes it the oldest Cyrillic manuscript currently part of a Bulgarian collection. The leaves are 19.5 by 15.5 centimetres (7.7 in × 6.1 in) in size, and the written area 13.5 by 10.5 centimetres (5.3 in × 4.1 in). It was written by a single scribe in a sloping uncial using dark brown ink. Ff.6r and 38r feature decorative headpieces of geometric and floral design. Additional decoration includes 18 initials, which are mostly geometric, though sometimes floral or interlaced. An initial on f.3 depicts a bird′s head, while ff.28v and 36v both have a Glagolitic letter Ⰱ as the initial letter of a reading.

The Enina Apostle is thought to have originally consisted of circa 215–220 leaves, of which only 39 have been at least partially preserved. Both the beginning and the end of the manuscript are missing, and there are no surviving marginal notes. The surviving text of the manuscript consists of readings from the Acts and Epistles for Saturdays and Sundays from the 35th Sunday after Pentecost until Great Saturday and for selected feasts from 1 September until 3 October, the feast day of Dionysius the Areopagite. The language of the text is classified as either Old Church Slavonic or as belonging to a category that chronologically immediately follows Old Church Slavonic.

== Editions ==
- Мирчев, К., Хр. Кодов. Енински апостол. Старобългарски паметник от ХІ век. София, 1965
- Хр. Кодов. Енински апостол. Факсимилно издание. София, 1983
- Digital facsimile in the Digital Library of the SS Cyril and Methodius National Library

== See also ==
- List of Glagolitic manuscripts (900–1199)
- Lists of Glagolitic manuscripts
