= Fragmenta Vindobonensia =

12th-century Glagolitic manuscript

Vienna folia
- Fragmenta Vindobonensia
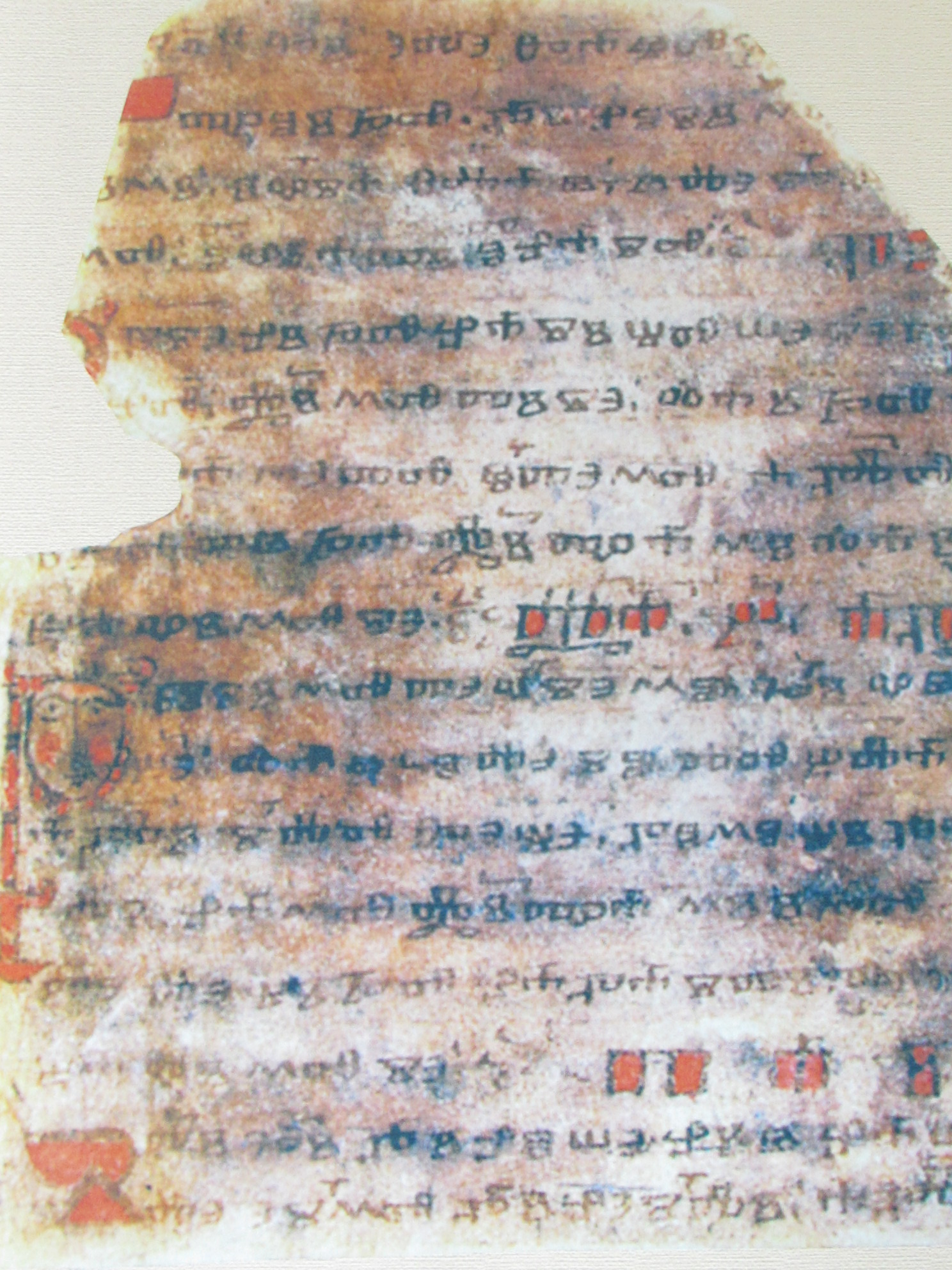
- One of the folios
- Size: 12 x 9.5 cm
- Writing: Glagolitic script
- Created: 1146-1156
- Discovered: 1890
- Discovered by: Vatroslav Jagić
- Place: Croatia
- Present location: Austrian National Library
- Identification: Cod. Slav. 136
- Language: Croatian

Fragmenta Vindobonensia, also known as the Vienna folios (German: Wiener glagolitische Blätter; Serbo-Croatian: Bečki listići), is the name of two illuminated Glagolitic folios that most likely originate from 11th or 12th-century Croatia and Dalmatia.

They were discovered and first described by Vatroslav Jagić in 1890 and are kept in the National Library in Vienna, the origin of their modern namesake. Some research puts their origin in western Croatia.

== Contents ==
The folios include text from Genesis 12:17–13:14 and Genesis 15:2–15:12. In addition, they contain the beginning of Paul's first letter to the Corinthians 4:9-16. It is an expanded Gregorian sacrament, and is relatively small. Scholars theorize that it was meant as a book used by a travelling missionary, due to its small size.

== See also ==
- List of Glagolitic manuscripts (900–1199)
- Lists of Glagolitic manuscripts

== Sources ==
- Vajs, Josef (1948). Najstariji hrvatskoglagoljski misal [The Oldest Croato-Glagolitic Missal] (in Croatian). Zagreb: Jugoslavenska akademija znanosti i umjetnosti.
- Hamm, Josip (1952). Datiranje glagoljskih tekstova [Dating Glagolitic Texts] (in Croatian) (1 ed.). Radovi Staroslavenskog Instituta.
- Birkfellner, Gerhard (1975). Glagolitische und kyrillische Handschriften in Österreich [Glagolitic and Cyrillic Manuscripts in Austria] (in German). Vienna: Austrian Academy of Sciences. ISBN 3-700-1-0141-4.
- Hercigonja, Eduard (1999). "Glagolists and Glagolism" Croatia in the Early Middle Ages. pp. 387–390.
