= Dimitri's Psalter =

11th century Glagolitic manuscript

The Psalter of St. Demetrius
- Псалтирът на Димитър Олтарник
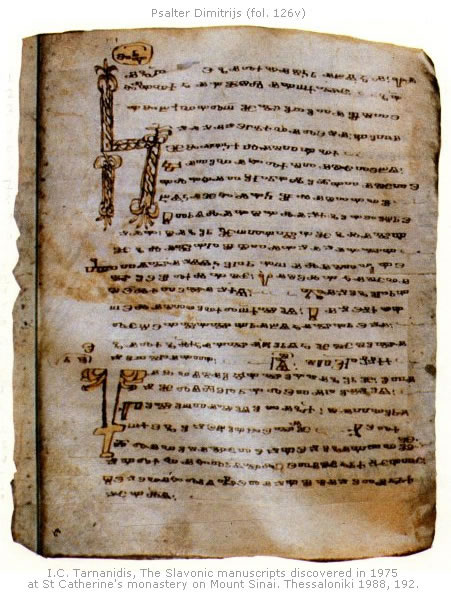
- Folio 22
- Size: 13.5 x 11 cm
- Writing: Glagolitic
- Created: 1046-1056, 1058-1066, 1094-1106
- Discovered: 1975; St. Catherine's Monastery, Sinai, Egypt
- Identification: Sin. slav. 3/N
- Language: Old Church Slavonic

Dimitri's Psalter is an 11th-century Glagolitic manuscript containing verses from the Psalms.

== History ==
The manuscript was discovered in 1975 in the Sinai Monastery of St. Catherine. It is currently still located in the monastery. The manuscript is completely preserved, and contains 145 leaves measuring 13.5 x 11 cm and has its original binding intact. The text dates back to the 11th century, and was published in its entirety in 2012 by Austrian historians.

== Description ==
The publisher of the description of the manuscript, Ioannis Tarnanidis, called it "The Psalter of Dmitry the Altarnik" on the basis of an entry on folio 1a, where the expression ⰰⰸⱏ ⰴⱏⰿⱅⱃⱏ ⰳⱃⱑⱎⱀⰺⰽⱏ (az dъmtrъ grěšnikъ) is followed by the beginning of a word that has not been preserved in full: ⱁⰾ(...), presumably, this is the beginning of the word ol (tarnik) . The name "Dmitry" is repeated on folio 141b: az dmtryi pisakh se.

The manuscript contains the Psalm of David, and contains the writings of two various scribes. The first is believed to have written the leaves: 1b-2a, 3a, 35b-141b, 142a-145b, and the second wrote the rest. Both scribes are alternating with different handwriting, and there are many unfilled pages in between that are filled with notes and prayers in Glagolitic writing.

The writing shows transitions within the Church Slavonic alphabet, as it contains orthography with ⱏ, the use of four yus, the presence of ⱋ, ⱎ, and ⱅ, and the clarification of reduced vowels with Cyrillic influence.

There are multiple notes and inserts in the manuscript in Greek, Latin, and Glagolitic. There are deuterocanonical texts, and recipes to protect against various ailments. The texts of the recipes contain unknown and little-known words and expressions that shed light on the culture of Balkan Slavs, such as: ⱍⰰⰹ (čai), ⱁⰱⱏⱃⰺⱀⱏ (obъrinъ), ⱂⱁⰽⱃⰺⰲⱏⱀⱁ ⰾⰺⱄⱅⰲⱏⰵ (pokrivъno listvъе = crooked foliage), ⰸⱁⰴⱏ (zodъ), ⱁⰿⰰⱀⱏ (omanъ), ⰿⱁⱅⱏⰹⰾⰰ (motъila), ⱄⱅⱆⰴⰵⱀⰺⱌⰰ (studenica = jelly), and ⱍⱔⰱⱃⰵⱀⱁ (чębreno).

According to the Bulgarian professor Boryana Velcheva, the manuscript comes from Northeastern Bulgaria, although most scholars, including the editors of the manuscript, have pointed out that the manuscript represents a collaboration between multiple scribes and was most likely produced on Sinai itself, while the scribe Demetrius came from the Adriatic coast, possibly the area of Duklja. Among Western Balkan features, the main text of the manuscript contains characters such as "ⱓ" instead of "ⱙ", which likely points to Serbian or Croatian scribes.

== Author ==
Miklas and colleagues hypothesized — while noting it could not be proven — that Dimitri might have worked as a physician at the Hospital of Saint John, but that later either he or the author of the Medical Folia moved to Saint Catherine's Monastery. The author of the Medical Folia was judged to hail from Istria based on botanical Slovenisms like kry (Prescription 5) and črěmošъ (Prescription 13), while acknowledging that the East Bulgarisms of the underlying text pointed to its translation or composition at Preslav. They provided a list of dialectalisms for each layer.

== Prayer Cycle ==
Dimitri's prayer cycle can be divided into 4 units:

1. 1r2–17
2. 2r2–13
3. 2r14–20, 3r14–21, 34v1–4 (with alleluia and psalm versicle)
4. 34v4, 140r13–23, 140v, 144r.

=== Unit 1 (Demetrii subscriptio I et precatio I ad S. Demetrium Thess. cum epilogo atque abecedario tripartito) ===
In Miklas' allegorical interpretation, which without further evidence he considers more of a "thought experiment", Dimitri is invoking his patron saint Demetrius of Thessalonica to protect the tradition of Cyril and Methodius of the same city, along with their Glagolitic script. He interprets the "great mountain" as Mount Sinai, located behind Saint Mary's Monastery (the contemporary name of Saint Catherine's Monastery), the she-wolf as the She-wolf of Rome, and the wolf as Pope Gregory VII, whom he contrasts in Unit 3 with Pope Gregory I, lifelong benefactor of Saint Catherine's Monastery and founder of a pilgrim's hospice in Jerusalem, as he does elsewhere with motifs Miklas believes were taken from Pope Gregory's vision of the Archangel Michael sheathing his sword as a sign of divine forgiveness. In this interpretation, Gregory VII was the antagonist for his role in the Synod of Split of 1059/1060, further tightening the liturgical language restrictions to the detriment of the Slavonic liturgy, stripping priests lacking Latin proficiency of their offices. Some Glagolite priests evidently left the realms of Peter Krešimir IV (later Demetrius Zvonimir) of the Kingdom of Croatia and Dalmatia, and Mihailo I of Duklja (later Constantine Bodin) of the Kingdom of Duklja and Serbia for the March of Istria, where the jurisdiction of Antipopes Clement III and Honorius II sheltered the Glagolite priests from those new restrictions. In 1084–1085, which may have been the time of writing, Pope Gregory VII had been reduced to captivity ("the wolf may not untie itself"), having barricaded himself inside the Mausoleum of Hadrian to escape Henry IV, Holy Roman Emperor.

азъ дъм(и)тръ [грѣшъ]никъ ол[е]
въ имѧ от҃(ь)ца и с҃(ъи)на и с҃[(вѧ)т҃а]г(о) д҃(ꙋ)х[а]
Възлѣзѫ на горѫ великѫ:
и възовѫ гласомъ велико
мъ: азъ вѧжѫ ѕвѣръ: и ꙋслъишитъ мѧ с(вѧ)т҃ъ҃и: д(ъ)м҃итръ: от
ъ солꙋна: и речетъ ми къ[то]
тъ естъ вѧжѫи ѕвѣръ: чло
вѣкъ естъ вѧжѫи ѕвѣръ ме
двѣдъ и медвѣдицѫ: вл[ь]
к[ъ] и влъчицѫ: лисицѫ и [ли]
сичищъ: игълѫ и нищиѭ: т[р]
естиѭ и оловом[ъ]: и ножъ в
ъ чрънѣ чрѣнꙋ вонъзѫ въ
капи своѧ: и донелѣже с[е]
и ножъ из[ъ]мѫ ис капи: в[л]
ъкъ да с[е н]е раздрѣшитъ
писахъ [же с]е нъ не вѣдѣт[ъ]
коли [лѣт]ъ: ꙋ св҃(вѧ)то м҃(а)р҃и[ѭ]
ΑΒ[Γ...]ΗΚΛΜΝξΟΠΡC
Τ[Υ][...]AbCdEFGhIKL
[M]NO[...][S]TUXYZ: ⰀⰁⰂ
ⰃⰄⰅ[Ⰶ][...]ⰊⰋⰌⰍⰎⰏⰐⰑ
ⰒⰓⰔ[Ⱅ...Ⱉ]ⰚⰜⰝⰞⰟ[...]
[...Ⱒ]ⰩⰣ[Ⱕ]
I, Dmitr, a sinner, alas!
In the name of the Father and of the Holy Spirit
I will climb a great mountain,
and I will call out with a great voice:
'I am binding the beast!' And Saint Demetrius will hear me,
of Thessalonica, and he will say to me: 'Who
is this that binds the beast?'
It is the man who binds the beast,
the bear and the she-bear,
the wolf and the she-wolf, the fox and
the fox-cub. With a needle and thread,
with a read and with lead. And a knife
will I thrust with a black handle into
my lintel. And until I
pull this knife out of the lintel,
the wolf may not untie itself!
And I wrote this, though it cannot be seen
which year, in Saint Mary's [Monastery].
ΑΒ[Γ...]ΗΚΛΜΝξΟΠΡC
Τ[Υ][...]AbCdEFGhIKL
[M]NO[...][S]TUXYZ: ⰀⰁⰂ
ⰃⰄⰅ[Ⰶ][...]ⰊⰋⰌⰍⰎⰏⰐⰑ
ⰒⰓⰔ[Ⱅ...Ⱉ]ⰚⰜⰝⰞⰟ[...]
[...Ⱒ]ⰩⰣ[Ⱕ]

—f. 1r

=== Unit 2 (Abecedarium latinum and Demetrii precatio II ad Dominum ICh contra lupum) ===
abcdefghıklmnopqrs
tuxy м(о)л(и)тва о влъцѣ да не в
[ъ]лазитъ въ кошарѫ╞
Г[(оспод)и] ис҃(ꙋсе)-х(рист)е: б(о)же нашъ: и с҃(вѧ)тъи: таръ
сии: б(о)же^{е} иже-си знаменалъ ꙋ
ст[а] лъвова: о данилѣ пр(о)р^{о}
цѣ: и о текълѣ: тъи знамена
и ꙋста влъчиѣ: и дивихъ
песъ: да не вълазѧтъ въ
кошарѫ: ни исказѧтъ бр[ъ]
ва: раба твоего сего: им^{[ѩ]} р[екъ]
и нъинѣ и присно и вѣкъи [а(минь):]
Печатъ даръ с(вѧ)т҃аго д҃(ꙋ)х[а]
abcdefghıklmnopqrs
tuxy A prayer against the wolf, that it might not
enter the sheepfold:
O Lord Jesus Christ, our God, and Holy Tarasios!
O God, who didst seal the
mouths of lions concerning Daniel the prophet
and concerning Thecla, do thou thyself seal
also the mouths of wolves and wild
dogs, that they might not enter the
sheepfold, nor destroy the livestock
of this thy servant,
stated by name,
now and ever unto the ages. Amen.
The seal of the gift of the Holy Spirit.

—f. 3r2–13

=== Unit 3 (Demetrii precatio III ad Dominum) ===
помилꙋи г҃(оспод)и сиѩ домъи
и скотъи-хъ денъ и нощъ: и
с(вѧ)т҃иъимъ [г]ригориемъ и б҃(огороди)ц
ѭ нищѧѩ и хромъиѩ съхр[а]
нѣи: и добъиваниѣ ихъ [м]
олимъ тѧ г҃(оспод)и: и млад
енъцѧ
и скотъи: въспѣстꙋ-и въс
питѣ-и юностъ: младенъцѧ
ꙋтѣши: тъщивъимъ крес
тъ помощъ: съ крестъ в[ѣ]
рънъимъ естъ сп҃(асе)ние.: Бѣ
сомь прогонителъ: к҃[р](е)с҃т(ъ)
слѣпъимъ вожд[ъ: д]ем[о
н]ом[ъ сѫ]ждение в[се]
Have mercy, O Lord, on these houses
and their livestock day and night. And
by holy Gregory and the Theotokos,
preserve the poor and the lame,
and their possessions.
We pray to you, O Lord: the infants
and the livestock. Foster and
raise the youth; the infants
comfort. To the destitute, the cross
is help; this cross
is salvation to the faithful,
to the demons the expeller. The cross is
a guide to the blind, to all demons judgement.

—ff. 2r14–20, 3r14–21

ч(а)с[ъ :а]: н(о)щь м(о)ли: ал(и)л(ꙋꙉи)ѣ: гл(а)съ :ж:
: ст҃(и)х(ъ): г҃(оспод)и ꙋсл[ъ]иши: до ѣко а[з]
ъ рабъ твои есмъ азъ: <мл>
итва[ми]
In the first your of the night, pray Aleluia in Mode 7,
line 'Lord, hear' through 'for I am
your servant I am [sic]' [Psalm 142]
in prayers

—f. 34v

=== Unit 4 (Demetrii precatio IV (ex oratione s. Grеgorii sumpta) ad ICh pro absolutione peccatorum in expectatione mortis) ===
григ(орие)^{ва} хр(ист)ие
молѧщѫ тебе: да би при
шелъ къ гробꙋ: въскрѣ
ситъ лаз[а]рѣ: и въск
рѣси и: тако и азъ мл[ѫ]
тѧ г(оспод)и: да въскрѣси[ши]
мѧ: отъ смръти мо
еѩ: [д]а постиг[н]ѫ с[т]а
ти о десн[ѫ]ѭ и с[лъ.
ша]ти гл(а)съ тв[о]и
[г]лаглѫщ[ъ]
придѣте б(ла)гословлени о(ть)ц҃а м
оего: и бѫди ми кротокъ: и м(и)лос
ръдъ: ѣкоже бъистъ блѫдънѣ
и: въ д[о]мꙋ симона прока
женаго: излѣи очима моима с
лъзъи ѣкоже излиѣлъ еси тои
: ѣже ноѕѣ твои омъи и власъи о
тира: и отъпꙋсти ѭ съ миром
^{ъ}⸱ тебе м(о)лѫ г҃(оспод)и ис҃(ꙋсе)-҃х҃р(и)сте вседръж
ителꙋ: да отъпꙋстиши всѧ
грѣхъи моѩ: прѣжде даже не
ꙋмрѫ: и да не порадꙋетъ сѧ
о мънѣ врагъ мои: и тебе м(о)л
ѫ с(вѧ)тъи петре: иже дръжиш
и клювчѧ ц҃(а)р҃(ь)с҃т҃в҃ꙋ: неб(е)с҃(ь)нꙋм
ꙋ: и да ми раздрѣши грѣхъи
моѩ на земи: и даждъ ми
г҃(оспод)и ис҃(ꙋсе)-҃х(рист)е: крѣпостъ с н҃(е)б҃(е)с҃е
да побѣждѫ диѣвола б
ъдѧщаго и борѧща сѧ съ
мноѭ: м(о)лѫ всѧ с҃(вѧ)тъ҃иѩ
[а]н҃ꙉ(е)лъи и арх҃(а)нꙉ(е)лъи
м(о)лѫ въсѧ с҃(вѧ)тъ҃иѩ патр
иа҃рх҃ъи: и всѧ с҃(вѧ)тъ҃и[ѩ]
твоѩ п҃р҃(о)р҃(о)к҃ъ҃и: и всѧ
с(вѧ)тъиѩ ап(о)с҃т(о)лъи: и
м[(ꙋ)че]н҃икъи
азъ д҃(ъ)м(и)^{т}р҃ъ(ъ) писахъ се
не ꙋмѣѩ
(Gregory's) O Christ
I will pray to you, that you would
approach the grave to resurrect
Lazarus. And you did resurrect [him]
So also I pray
to you O Lord, that you might resurrect
me from my death
that I might attain to stand
on your right hand and hear to your voice
saying 'Come, blessed of my
Father,' and be gentle and merciful to me,
as you were to the harlot
in the house of Simon the Leper.
Pour out into my eyes
tears, as she poured them out—
she who washed your feet and with her hair
wiped them—and dismiss me in peace.
To you I pray o Lord Jesus Christ almighty,
that you might forgive all
my sins, before I
die, so that my enemy might not rejoice
over me. And to you I pray
O Saint Peter, who holds
the keys of the empire of heaven,
that you might loose my sins
on earth. And grant me,
O Lord Jesus Christ, strength from heaven
to defeat the devil,
watching and fighting against
me. I pray to all the holy
angels and archangels;
I pray to all the holy patriarchs,
and to all Your holy
prophets, and all the
holy apostles, and
martyrs.
I, Dmitr, wrote this,
[being] ignorant.

—ff. 140r13–23, 140v, 141r0

исповѣдъникъи и постъникъ
и всѧ с҃(вѧ)т҃ъ҃иѩ дѣвъи: и всѧ с[(вѧ)т҃ъ]
иѩ изъбранъиѩ твоѩ: да въ
схотѧтъ м(о)лити за мѧ грѣ[ш]
ънаго: и призъиваѩ-тѣ г(оспод)ъ:
иже прѣдъ б҃(ого)мъ денъ и нощъ
не прѣстаѭтъ въпиѭще и
глаголще: с(вѧ)^{т}(ъ): с(вѧ)^{т}(ъ): с(вѧ)^{т}(ъ): г҃(оспод)ъ саваот
ъ: да м(о)лѧтъ за мѧ да възм^{о}
[г]ѫ ѫделѣти всѣмъ безко
ниемъ моимъ ѩже есмъ с
ътворилъ: отъ юности мо
еѩ дондънѣщънѣго дъне:
[и]нъинѣ м(о)лѫ сѧ къ тебѣ г҃(оспод)и и
[сꙋ]с(е)-х҃(рист)ѩ҃ [тъ]
и бо еси
[б(ог)ъ] щедръ
и м(и)лостивъ: и м(и)л҃(срь)дъ всѣм
ъ призъиваѭщимъ и
мѧ твое въ истинѫ м(о)л
ѫ тѧ и прошѫ г(пспод)и да ꙋс
лъишиши м(о)л(и)твѫ моѭ
и живъи ц(а)рствꙋѩ(щ)и [съ ѡ]ц
емъ и с҃(вѧ)т҃ъ҃имъ д҃(ꙋ)х(о)м(ъ)
Confessors and fasters,
all holy virgins, and all saints,
chosen of yours: may they be
willing to pray for me, a sinner.
And I call on you, lords,
which before God day and night
do not cease, crying out and
saying, 'Holy, holy, holy, Lord of Sabaoth.'
May they pray for me, that I may be able to
overcome all my iniquities, which I have
committed, from my youth to my
present day.
And now I pray to you, O Lord
Jesus Christ. For thou art
a god bountiful
and merciful, and compassionate to all
who call upon
thy name in truth. I bessech
thee and ask O Lord, that
you hear my prayer
and live reigning with the Father
and the Holy Spirit.

—f. 144r

== See also ==
- List of Glagolitic manuscripts (900–1199)
- Lists of Glagolitic manuscripts

== Bibliography ==
- Nikolaevich Severĭyanov, Sergey (1922). Синайская псалтырь. Глаголический памятник XI века (in Russian). Saint Petersburg.
- Hamm, Josip (1957). "Slavistički sastanak u Beogradu; Nova izdanja starih tekstova i priručnika". Slovo: časopis Staroslavenskoga instituta u Zagrebu (in Croatian). 6-7-8: 414–420.
- Nazor, Anica (2 November 1996). "Bašćanski ostrišci iz 12. st". Vjesnik (in Croatian). Zagreb. p. 17.
- Rosenschon, Ursula (1994). "Sechs Seiten medizinischer Rezepte im glagolitischen Psalter 3/N des Sinaiklosters". Byzantinoslavica (in German). 55 (2): 304–335.
- Marti, Roland (1999). "Abecedaria. A Key to the Original Slavic Alphabet". Thessaloniki – Magna Moravia. pp. 175–200.
- Miklas, Heinz; Gau, Melanie (2000). "Preliminary Remarks on the Old Church Slavonic Psalterium Demetrii Sinaitici". The Bible in Slavic Tradition. p. 21.
- Miklas, Heinz; MacRobert, Catharine M.; Sobolev, Andrej N. (2021). Psaterium Demetrii Sinaitici: Monasterii s. Catharinae codex slav. 3/N, adiectis foliis medicinalibus. Glagolitica Sinaitica: Editionen und Abhandlungen zur glagolitisch-altkirchenslavischen Tradition des Sinai. Vol. 2. Vienna: Hozhausen. ISBN 978-3-902868-80-0. ISSN 2304-6724.
