= Severna Makedoniya =

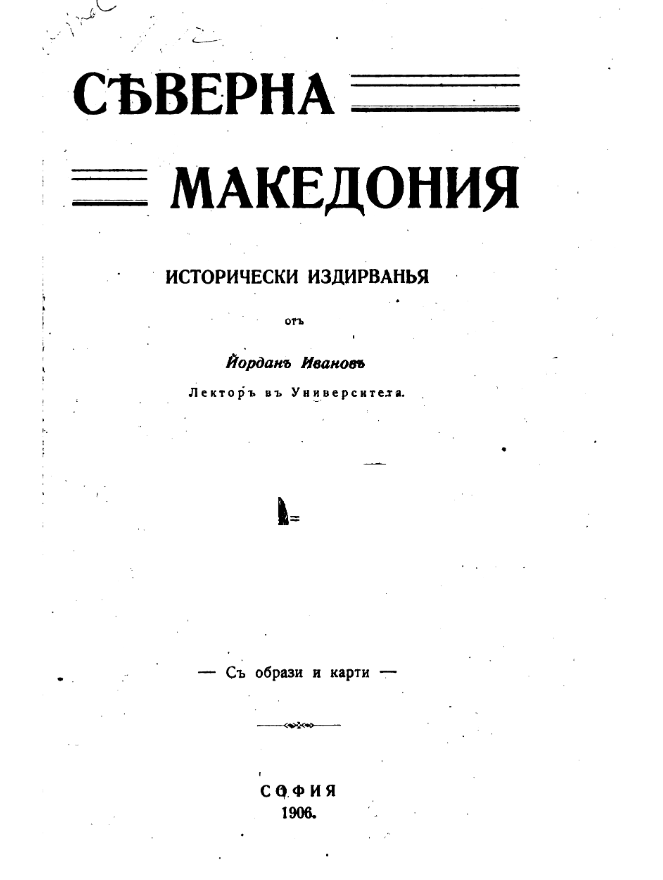
The cover of the book "North Macedonia" by Yordan Ivanov.

Severna Makedonia (Bulgarian: Сѣверна Македония, 'Northern Macedonia') is a book by Yordan Ivanov, a Bulgarian literary historian, archaeologist and folklorist, and contains historical research for the history of the Kyustendil region from antiquity to the Liberation of Bulgaria (1878). The book was published in Sofia in 1906. It consists of 12 chapters. Chapter 1 is about the ancient Pautalia and its surroundings, Chapter 2 is to medieval Velbuzhd. Chapter 3 examines the development of Christianity in North Macedonia. Chapter 4 traces the emergence, history and fall of the Ottoman Empire in the area. Chapter 5, entitled "Kyustendil Sandjak", provides a geographical and historical overview of the cities located in this area: Dupnitsa, Radomir, Vranje, Kriva Palanka, Kratovo, Shtip, Veles, Radovish, Strumitsa, Kochani and Kumanovo. Chapter 6 deals with agriculture and mining in the district. Chapter 7 researches the history of Kyustendil in the 19th century. Chapters 8 and 9 are dedicated to the Kyustendil Diocese in the 19th century. Chapter 10 contains information on the 19th-century schools in Shtip, Kratovo, Kyustendil, etc. Chapter 11 provides information on the ancient and medieval epigraphic monuments. Chapter 12 contains references to the corresponding preceding pages. The book contains 420 pages, with 3 maps, 21 graphics and 18 black and white photo illustrations, a plan, 5 facsimiles and 65 epigraphic monuments from Latin, Greek, Slavic and Ottoman sources and a pointer of personal and geographical names. It has long been a bibliographic rarity.
