= Sava's book =

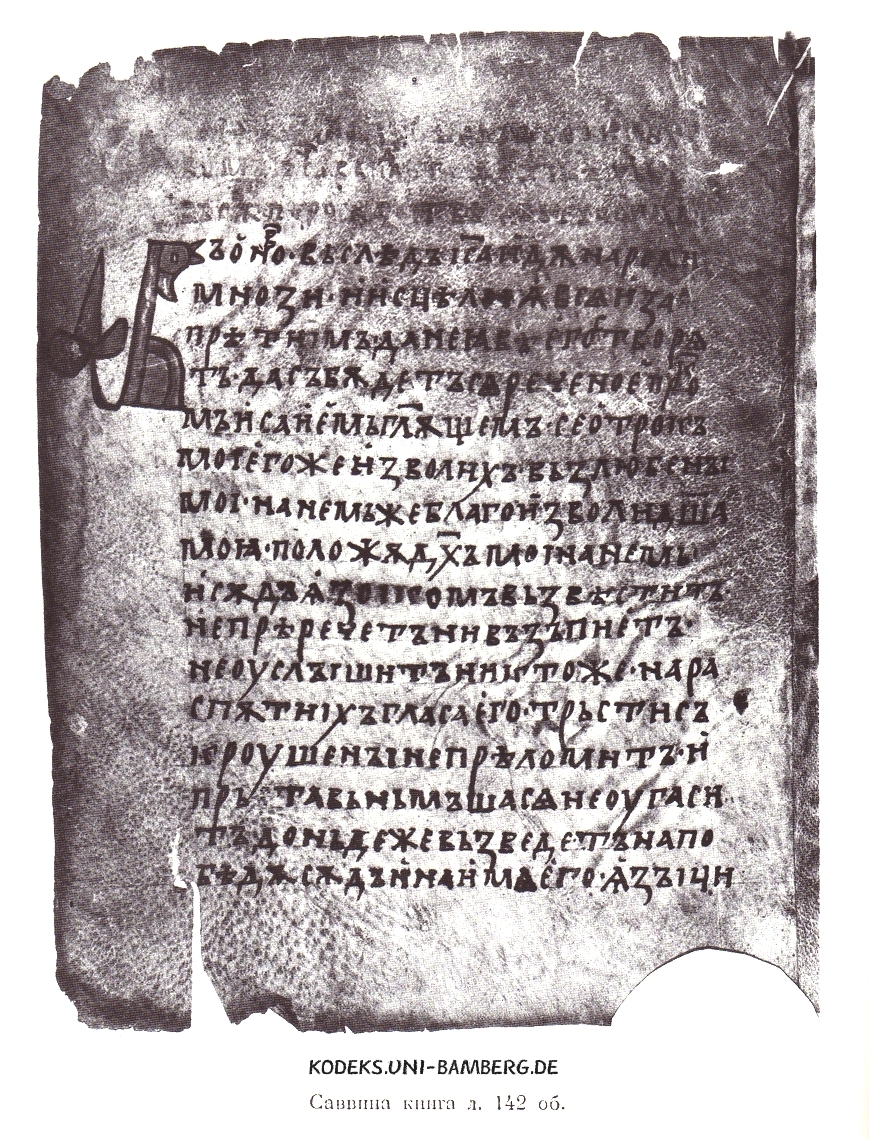
Sava's book, 1.142

Sava's book (Bulgarian: Савина книга, romanized: Savina kniga; Russian: Саввина книга, romanized: Savvina kniga) is a 129-folio Cyrillic Old Church Slavonic canon evangeliary, written in the 11th century.

The original 126 parchment folios are of Bulgarian provenance, being bound into a larger codex with later additions of the Russian Church Slavonic recension. The codex is named after the priest Sav(v)a, who inscribed his name on two of the original folios. There is no other historical record of Sava, and it is therefore believed that he was one of the manuscript's copyists.

The early history of Sava's book is unknown. What can be ascertained is that the codex was in the Seredkino monastery near Pskov until at least the 17th century. Afterwards it was moved to the manuscript collection of the Moscow Synodal Printing House, where it was found in 1866 by the Russian Slavist Izmail Sreznevsky, who gave the codex its modern-day appellation and was the first one to publish it in Saint Petersburg in 1868. Today it is kept in the Russian State Archives of Ancient Documents in Moscow.

The first critical edition of the manuscript was published by V. N. Ščepkin (Savvina kniga, Saint Petersburg 1903), photographically reprinted in Graz in 1959. Ščepkin was the first to perform a paleolinguistic analysis of the manuscript (Razsuždenie o jazyke Savvinoj knigy, 1899), and he ascertained that it was copied from a Glagolitic original. His 1903 edition led N. Karinski to propound several new readings and to fix some wrong solutions (Perečenь važnejših netočnostei poslednego izdanija Savvinoj knigi, Izv., XIX, 3, 206-216). Paleographic and linguistic analysis shows that the copyist wrote yers where he did not pronounce them anymore, and that behind č, ž and š he wrote ъ instead of ь, which indicates that the aforementioned consonants were pronounced "hard" in the scribe's mother tongue, or, more likely, that other than the preserved softness in the preceding consonant the two yers had merged. There is abundant evidence for the loss of epenthetic l, and, instead of iotated a (ꙗ), yat (Ѣ) is often written.

== See also ==
- Codex Zographensis
- Psalterium Sinaiticum
- Codex Marianus
- Glagolita Clozianus
