= Miscellany (Puncho) =

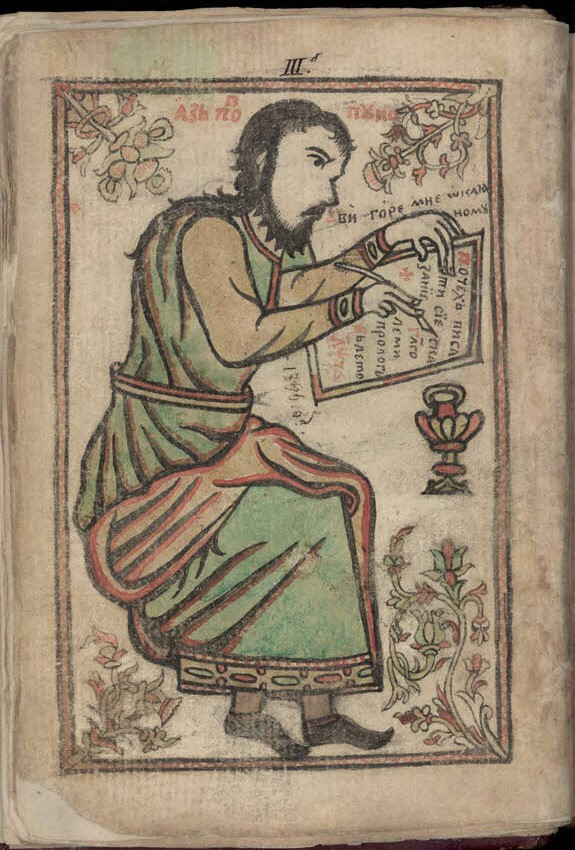
- Author: Puncho the priest
- Language: Bulgarian
- Subject: sermons
- Publication date: 1796
- Media type: ink and color on parchment
- Pages: 809
- Website: IntegrationViewer
- SS. Cyril and Methodius National Library

Miscellany (Bulgarian: Поппунчов сборник, romanized: Poppunčov sbornik) is a collection of sermons and other religious texts (a Damaskin), by Puncho Kuzdin (Пунчо Куздин), a priest and pupil of Paisius of Hilendar who compiled, scribed and illustrated it by 1796, in a village near Mokreš Lomu. Today it is in the SS. Cyril and Methodius National Library in Sofia (under the shelfmark NBKM 693). The 809 pages are 20.5 х 15 centimeters.

The collection is an important witness to the nascent modern literary Bulgarian language, as written by an educated man using the commonly spoken language of Bulgarian (mokrešský dialect). The text is accompanied by several miniatures, including two self-portraits.

== Sources ==
- Šaur, Vladimír. Pop Punčov sbornik kak istočnik istoriko-dialektologičeskich issledovanij. 1. vyd. Praha: Ústav jazyků a literatur ČSAV, 1970. (rusky s českým resumé)
- Šaur, Vladimír. Vztah mezi vlivy dialektů a jiných slovanských jazyků v počátcích vytváření spisovné bulharštiny. In Studia Balkanica Bohemoslovaca : (příspěvky přednesené na I. celostátním balkanistickém symposiu v Brně 11.-12. prosince 1969). S. 254-260.
