= Dobreyshovo Gospels =

Gospels written in cyrillic by Priest Dobreisho

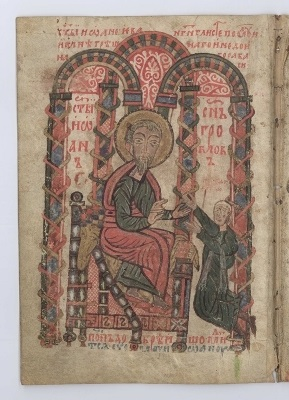
- Original title: Добрейшово евангелие
- Publication date: 13th century
- Publication place: Bulgaria
- Media type: ink and gouache on parchment
- Pages: 175
- SS. Cyril and St. Methodius National Library

Dobreyshovo gospel is a Bulgarian monument of the early 13th century.

== Description ==
The manuscript is ink and illumination on a total of 175 parchment leaves. It is located at the SS. Cyril and Methodius National Library, Bulgaria.

== History ==
The Gospel was written, according to a much later note added to it, before 1221, according to the scholars Wolf and Stresa. It is decorated with colorful ornamentation and images of the Evangelists Luke and John. The latter appears with a small kneeling figure, accompanied by the caption "pray to St. John"; the figure is believed to represent the priest Dobreysho (or Dobreisho), who probably paid for the parchment and either commissioned or made a copy of the book.

The manuscript was found in Tulcea, Romania. Records indicate that it earlier was in Edirne. The majority of it (127 sheets) is now in the National Library "St.. St. Cyril and Methodius" (№ 17). The remaining 48 leaves were kept in Belgrade during the Second World War and did not survive the fire after the museum was hit by a bomb in 1941.

== Language ==
The language of the monument is close to Old Church Slavonic but shows some important new features.

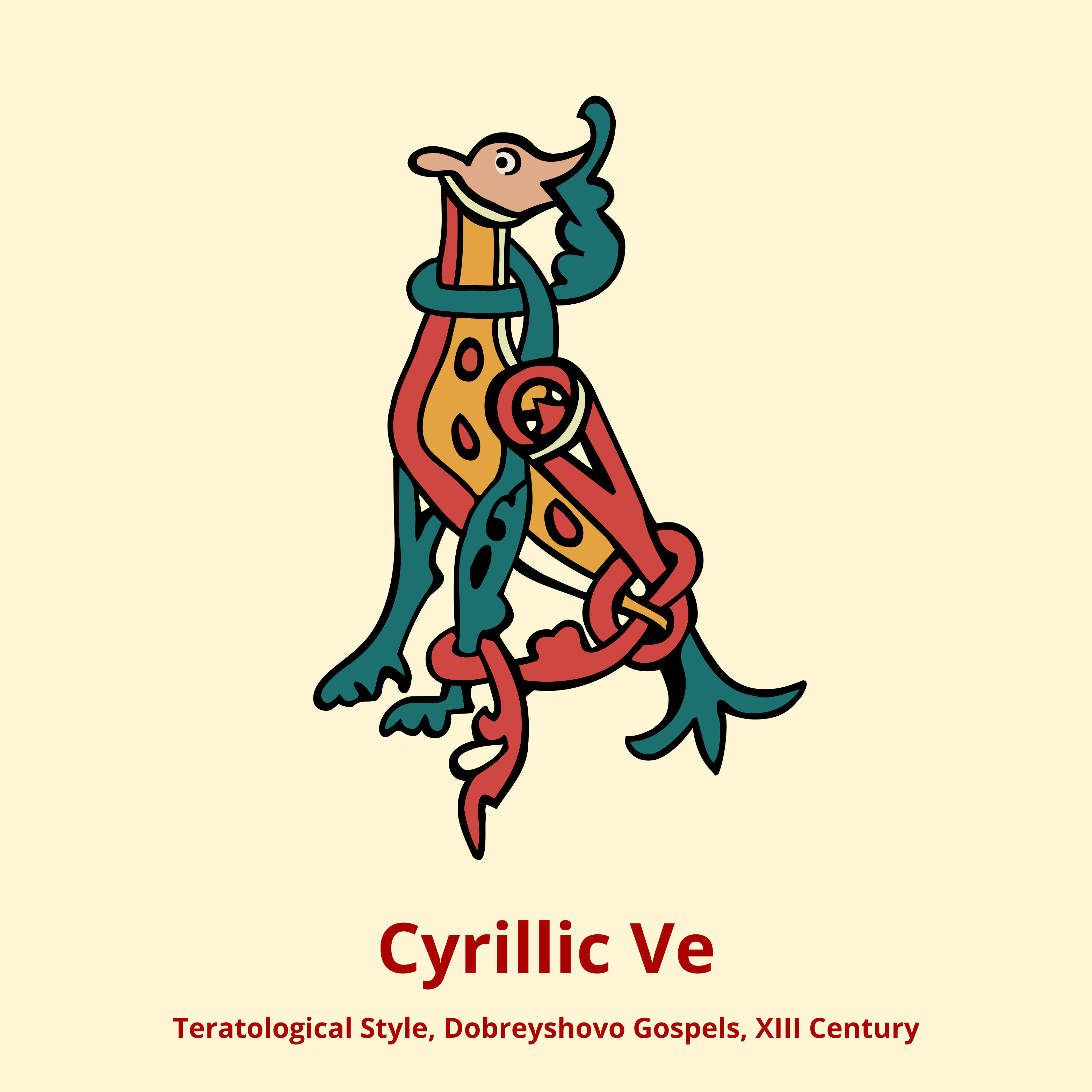
Cyrillic Ve. Teratological style. Dobreyshovo Gospels XIII century. Digital revival.

== See also ==
- List of Glagolitic manuscripts (900–1199)
- Lists of Glagolitic manuscripts

== Sources ==
- Б. Цонев, Добрейшово евангелие. Български старини 1, София 1906.
- Вълкова, М. За техниката и материалите в украсата на Добрейшовото евангелие. – Проблеми на изкуството, 42, 2009, кн. 2, 48-55
- Vakareliyska, C. M. Western Bulgarian or Macedonian? The Dobrejšo Gospel. – Slovo, 50, 2010, 13-26

== See also ==
- Dobreisho Gospel at Wikimedia Commons
