= Russian influence on the Bulgarian language =

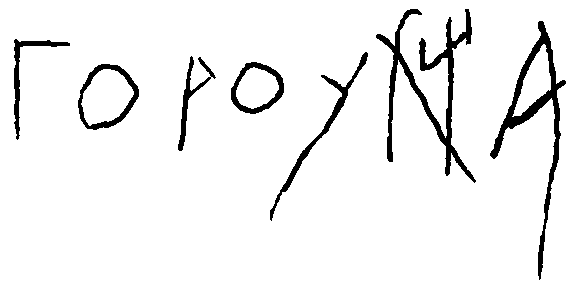
The first Russian inscription dates from the second quarter of the 10th century.

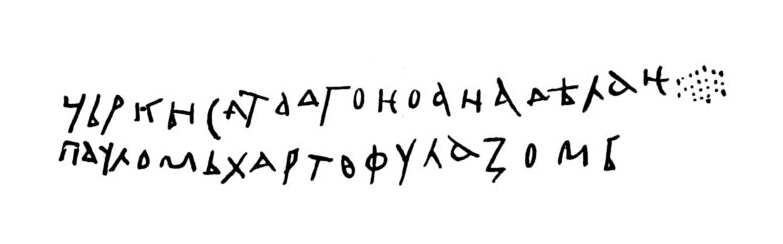
Inscription of chartophylax Paul from the interior of the Round Church, Preslav

Russian influence on the Bulgarian language dates back to the 18th century after the reforms of Peter the Great and the declaration of Russia as an empire (October 22, 1721). The beginning is marked by the translation of the "Kingdom of the Slavs" into Russian.

To begin with, a teacher in Voivodina, where many Bulgarians live, was sent Maxim Suvorov with many alphabet book in Civil Script. Catherine the Great sponsors the printing business in Venice of Dimitri Theodosius.

Russian influence follows the first and second Bulgarian literary and cultural influences on the Russian language, literature and culture, which date back to the golden Age of medieval Bulgarian culture and the Tarnovo Literary School.

Russian influence is expressed in the construction of secular education, the introduction of new scientific, political and cultural terminology, mainly after the Crimean War.
