= Yordan Ivanov (literary historian) =

- Йордан Иванов Николов
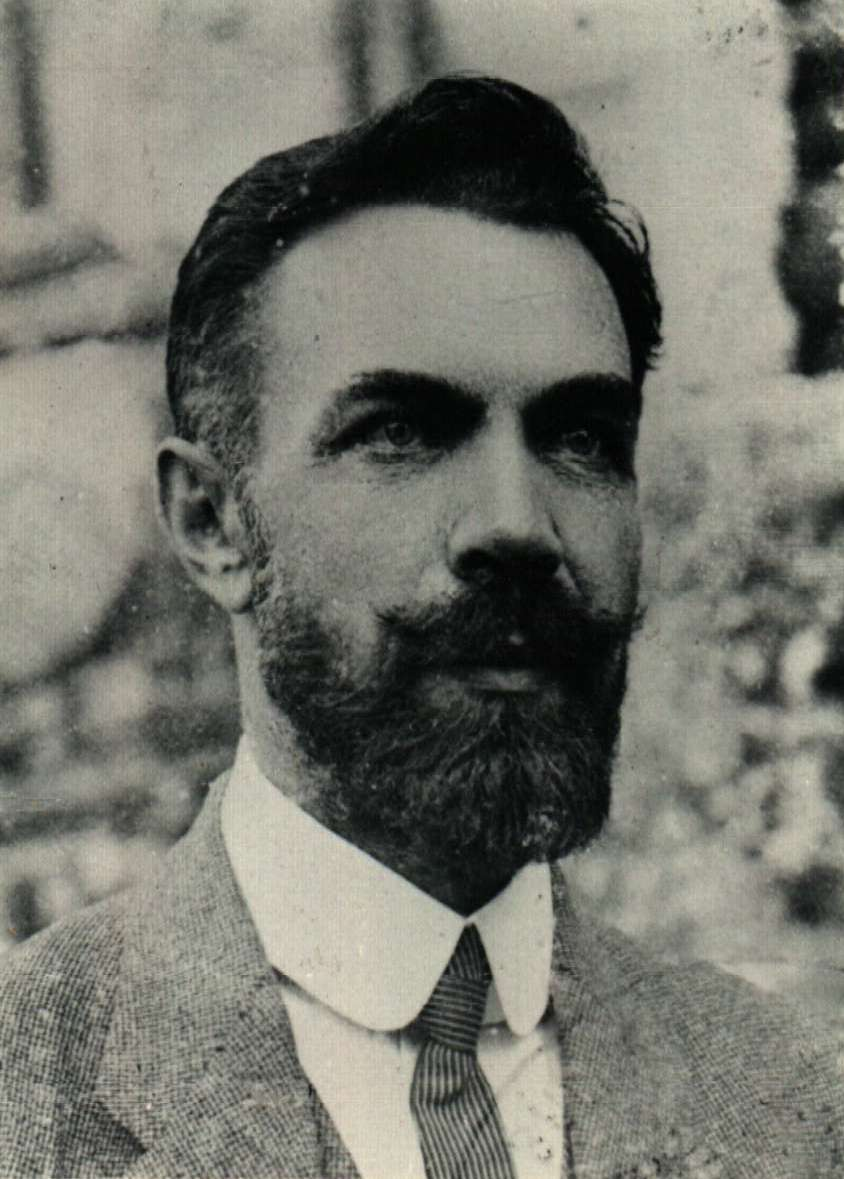
- Born: Yordan Ivanov Nikolov; 6 January 1872; Kyustendil, Ottoman Empire
- Died: 29 July 1947 (aged 75); Sofia, Bulgaria
- Occupations: Literary historian, archeologist, folklorist
- Known for: Bulgarian studies, Bogomil literature
- Notable work: La question macedonienne au point de la vue historique, ethnographique et statistique; Livres et legendes bogomiles

Yordan Ivanov was a Bulgarian literary historian. A full member of the Bulgarian Academy of Sciences since 1909, he was an expert on the literary and cultural heritage of the Bogomils.

Ivanov is known as the discoverer of the manuscript original of Istoriya Slavyanobolgarskaya in the Zograf Monastery. He was the favorite lecturer of Yordan Yovkov.

He wrote several fundamental historical works revealing the Bulgarian character of Macedonia, and many studies on his home town and region.

From 1920 to 1923 and again from 1927 to 1930, he was posted as a professor of Bulgarian language at the Institut national des langues et civilisations orientales in Paris, which laid the foundation for Cyrillo-Methodian Studies in France.

== Selected books ==
- North Macedonia (1906)
- Bulgarians in Macedonia (1915)
