= Ivan Dobrev =

Bulgarian Slavicist

- Born: Ivan Dobrev; 18 October 1938; Sliven, Bulgaria
- Other names: Иван Добрев
- Occupation: linguist
- Known for: Cyrillo-Methodian Studies
- Notable work: Rashka script and Bulgarian spelling in the Middle Ages

Ivan Dobrev is a Bulgarian Slavicist. He is one of the founders of the Department of Cyrillo-Methodian Studies at Sofia University.

In 1962, he graduated Bulgarian Philology at Sofia University and for 46 years taught in it, as well as at other Bulgarian universities, the subjects of Old Bulgarian language and history in Bulgarian. He has specialized in Moscow and St. Petersburg. He has been a member of Bulgarian Academy of Sciences since 1996.

He is the author of more than 100 articles and studies.
