= Glagolita Clozianus =

14-folio Glagolitic Old Church Slavonic canon miscellany

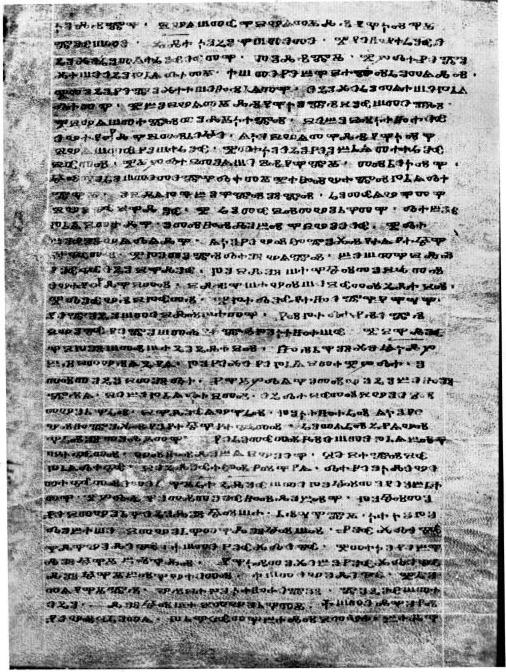
Glagolita Clozianus

The Glagolita Clozianus is a 14-folio Glagolitic Old Church Slavonic canon miscellany, written in the eleventh century.

What remained of an originally very large codex, having probably 552 folios (1104 pages), are 14 folios containing five homilies. Two of the homilies are complete; one by John Chrysostom and one by Athanasius of Alexandria, and three of them are fragments, one by John Chrysostom, one by Epiphanius of Salamis and one that is usually attributed to Methodius. Four of those homilies are known from other Old Church Slavonic codices, the exception being the one usually attributed to St. Methodius, which is found only in Clo, and sometimes referred to as the Anonymous Homily.

The codex was named after the Count Paris Cloz who owned it in the first half of the 19th century. Prior to that, up until the end of the 15th century, it was owned by the Croatian nobles of the House of Frankopan, who used the codex as a house relic (it was bound with silver and gold) in worship, believing St. Jerome to be the author. Count Cloz donated the codex to the City Museum in Trent, where the first 12 folios are being kept today. The remaining 2 folios, discovered by Slovene Slavist Franz Miklosich, are kept in the Ferdinandeum museum in Innsbruck.

Linguists somewhat disagree when discussing the source of the text; some, arguing on the similarity of the rounded Glagolitic with Sinaitic codices (Psalterium Sinaiticum, Euchologium Sinaiticum), hold that the manuscript originated in Macedonia, and others that it was written in Croatia, justifying it with the change of ь to ъ behind palatal č, ž, št and žd, a trait commonly found in other Croatian Glagolitic mediaeval manuscripts. The reasonable conclusion that follows is that the manuscript was copied on the Croatian territory from the original written somewhere northwest of Macedonia-Bulgaria (being similar to the Codex Marianus).

The text was first published by Jernej B. Kopitar (Vienna 1836, the first 12 folios), together with the Freising Fragments and the manuscript De conversione Bagaorium et Carantanorum. Franz Miklosich published two folios from Innsbruck in 1860, and both pieces were published together by I. I. Sreznjevski in 1866. Critical edition with Ancient Greek originals was published by Václav Vondrák (Glagolita Clozùv 1893) and finally by Antonín Dostál (Clozianus, staroslověnsky hlaholský sborník tridentský a innsbrucký, Prague 1959). Dostal's edition contains photographs, Cyrillic transcription, Ancient Greek original, translations to Czech and a dictionary.

== See also ==
- List of Glagolitic manuscripts (900–1199)
- Lists of Glagolitic manuscripts

== Link ==
Text of codex
