= Odesa National Scientific Library =

Public library established in 1829

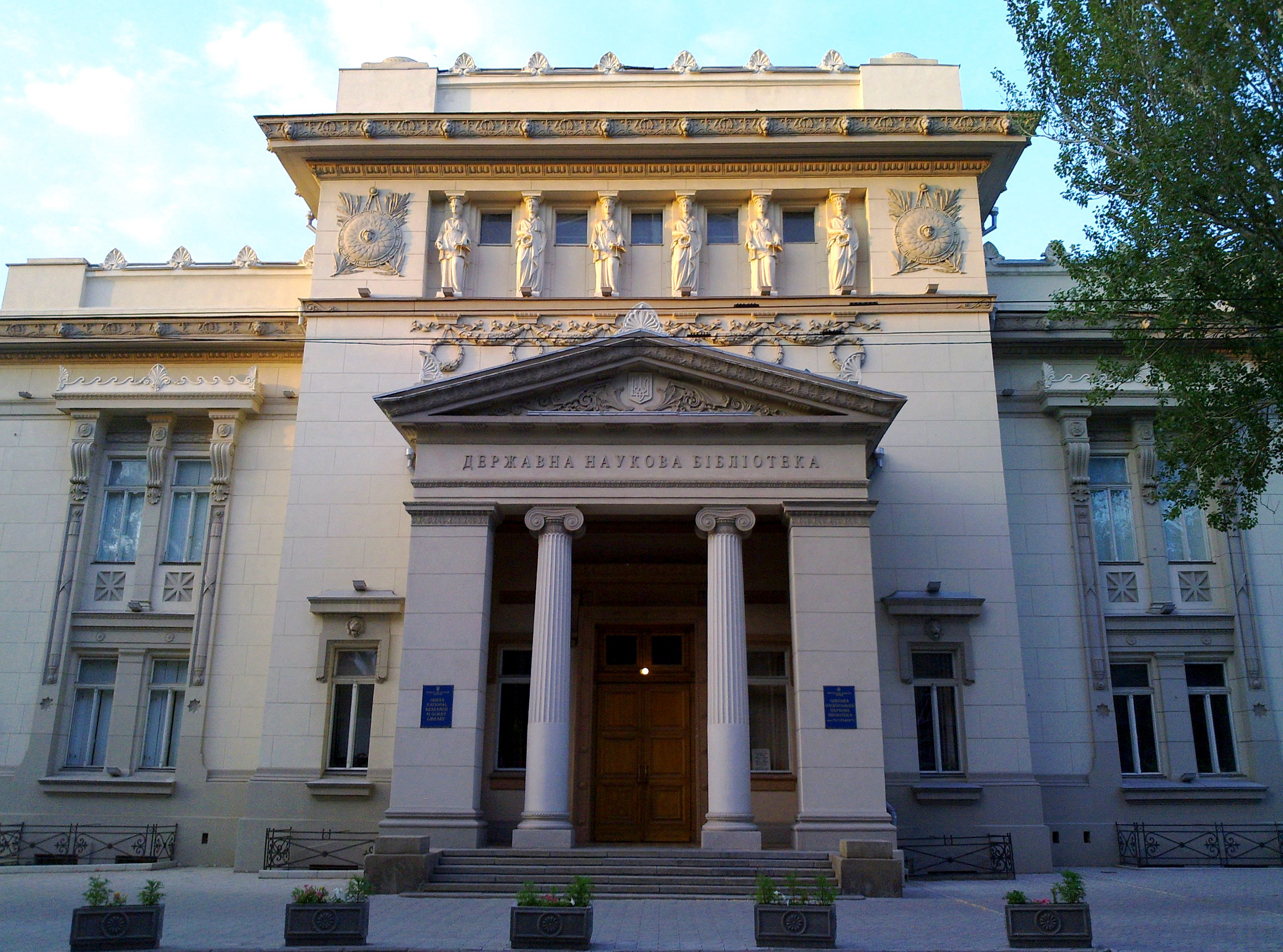
- Main entrance on Pasteur street 13
- 46.4911°N 30.7261°E
- Location: Odesa, Ukraine
- Established: 1829

Collection

Other information
- Website: http://odnb.odessa.ua/

The Odesa National Scientific Library (Ukrainian: Одеська національна наукова бібліотека, romanized: Odeska natsionalna naukova biblioteka) is a public library established in 1829 in Odesa, Ukraine. The library moved to its current location in 1907, into a new building designed by architect Fyodor Nesturkh in neo-Greek style. The library has been renamed numerous times throughout history, arriving to its current name in 2015. The library has a collection of over 5 million books, including 200,000 rare editions.

== See also ==
- List of libraries in Ukraine
