= Victor Grigorovich =

Russian historian

Victor Grigorovich Виктор Григорович
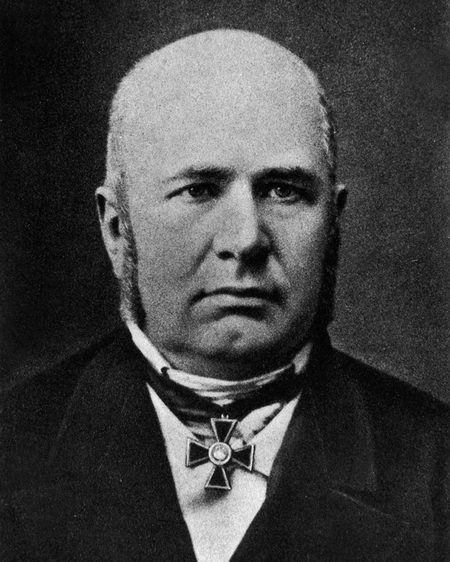
- Born: 30 April 1815; Balta, Kherson Governorate, Russian Empire
- Died: 19 December 1876 (aged 61); Yelisavetgrad, Russian Empire
- Occupations: Slavist, folklorist, literary critic, historian, journalist

Victor Ivanovich Grigorovich (Russian: Ви́ктор Ива́нович Григоро́вич; 30 April 1815 – 19 December 1876) was a Russian Slavist, folklorist, literary critic, historian and journalist, one of the originators of Slavic studies in the Russian empire.

== Early life and education ==
Victor Grigorovich was born on 10 April 1815, in Balta, today Ukraine, where his father served. His mother was a Polish Catholic.

He studied in Balta and Uman at the Basilian School, later enrolling at Kharkov University. After graduating from there, he lived in Dorpat for four years, where he studied philosophy and classical philology.

== Kazan University ==
In 1839, Grigorovich was invited to Kazan University to the newly opened department of Slavic languages. In 1840, he presented to the faculty a candidate's essay titled "Research on the Church Slavonic Language", in which he spoke in favor of the Pannonian theory of the origin of the Old Church Slavonic language. He then traveled abroad, and upon his return, he passed his master's exam and published his dissertation titled "Experience in the Presentation of Slavic Literature in its More Important Eras". This was, according to Ivan Kotliarevsky, "the first scholarly essay in Russia about Slavic literature from the point of view of Slavic reciprocity", where not only Russian and Polish literature was considered in parallel, but literary facts from the life of such nationalities were compared, for which no literature had been recognized until then.

From 1842 through 1863, Grigorovich was a professor at the department of Slavic literature at the University of Kazan.

== Travels to the Ottoman Balkans ==
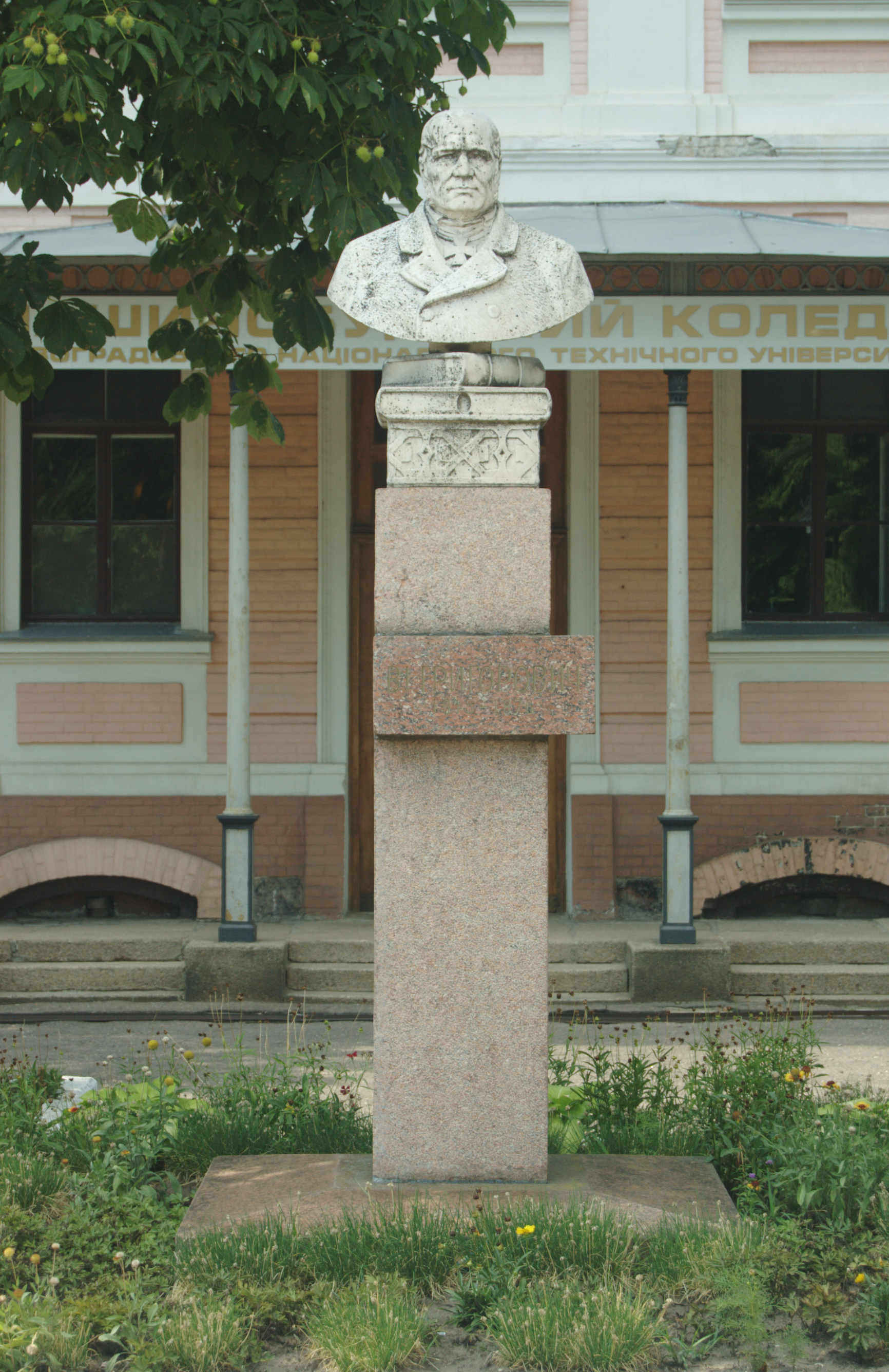
Bust of Victor Grigorovich at Kropyvnytskyi (previously Elizavetgrad) where he died.

Grigorovich was one of the first scholars to study the archaeology, ethnography and history of the South Slavs. Between 1844 and 1847, he made a two-and-a-half year tour through the Ottoman Balkans, where he collected a lot of works of South Slavic and Church Slavonic literature. During his trip he found valuable Medieval manuscripts that he took to Russia. He drew extensively upon some Byzantine sources for studying the history of the Balkan Slavs in several works. Grigorovich published the collection of his Slavic study in "Outline of a Journey through European Turkey". His book was published in the Scientific notes of Kazan University in 1848, helping the Russian public to get to know the South Slavic peoples better.

== Moscow, Kazan and Odessa University ==
In 1849, Grigorovich's activity in Kazan was interrupted by his transfer to Moscow, in place of Osip Bodyansky. At Moscow University, which was imposed on him to a certain extent, he felt very uncomfortable and gave almost no lectures. Using his precious collection of manuscripts, which he brought from the Slavic lands and from Mount Athos, he aroused the interest in paleography in Fyodor Buslaev and other young scientists.

Grigorovich returned to Kazan, and from 1854 to 1856, in addition to the university, he taught Slavic paleography at the Kazan Theological Seminary. In 1865, he was appointed professor at the newly opened Imperial Novorossiya University in Odessa.

== Death ==
In 1876, Grigorovich resigned and moved to Elizavetgrad, from where he was planning to make excursions to all parts of southern Russia, but on 19 December 1876 he suddenly died. His students and admirers began collecting donations for the construction of a monument to him at Imperial Novorossiya University.
