= Middle Bulgarian =

Earlier form of Bulgarian

- Era: 12th–16th centuries, developed into Modern Bulgarian
- Language family: Indo-European: Balto-Slavic; Slavic; Eastern South Slavic; Old Bulgarian; Middle Bulgarian

Language codes
- ISO 639-3: –

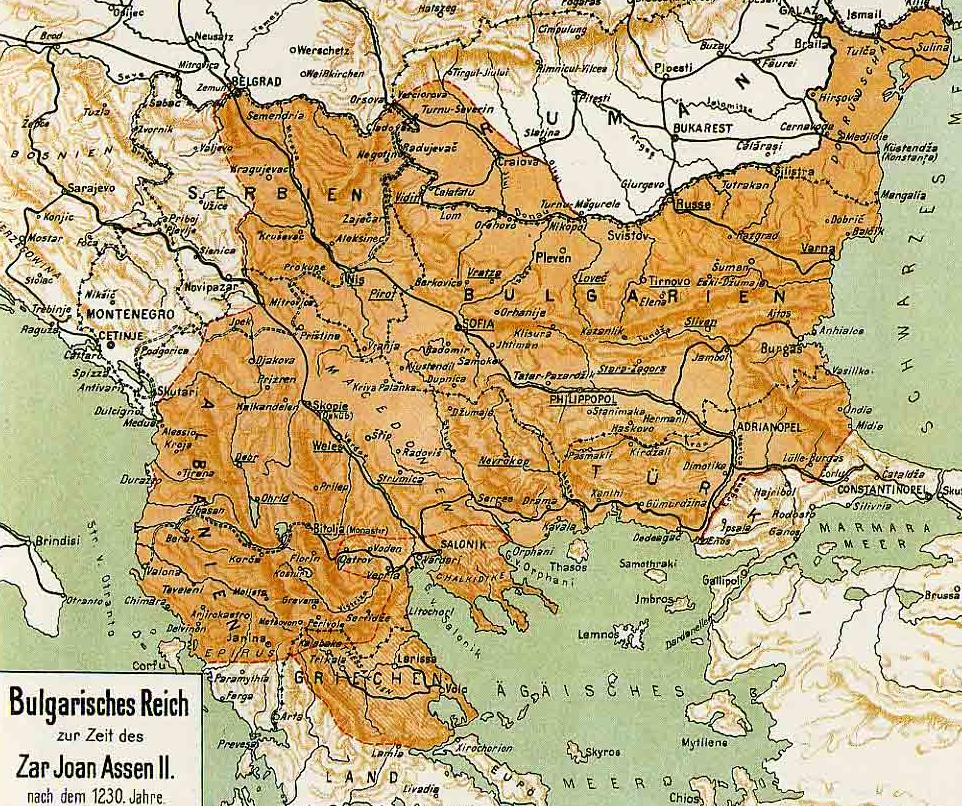
Bulgaria in 1230

Middle Bulgarian (Bulgarian: среднобългарски език) was the lingua franca and the most widely spoken language of the Second Bulgarian Empire. Being descended from Old Bulgarian, Middle Bulgarian eventually developed into the modern Bulgarian language by the 16th century.

== History ==
The use of Middle Bulgarian started from the end of the 12th century and continued to the 17th century. This period of the language exhibits significantly different morphology from earlier periods, most notably in the complete disappearance of the locative, instrumental, and genitive cases. Analytical tools for the gradation of adjectives and adverbs appear. In most dialects ъi transformed to и, but ъi continued to be used in monumental inscriptions. Sultan Selim II spoke and used it well.

== Features ==
In the Middle Bulgarian language there is an increased use of prepositions in the place of the dative, genitive and instrumental cases. There are instances of the genitive being replaced by the preposition от, and of the dative being replaced by various prepositional constructions.
