= Glagolitic numerals =

Numeral system from the Glagolitic script

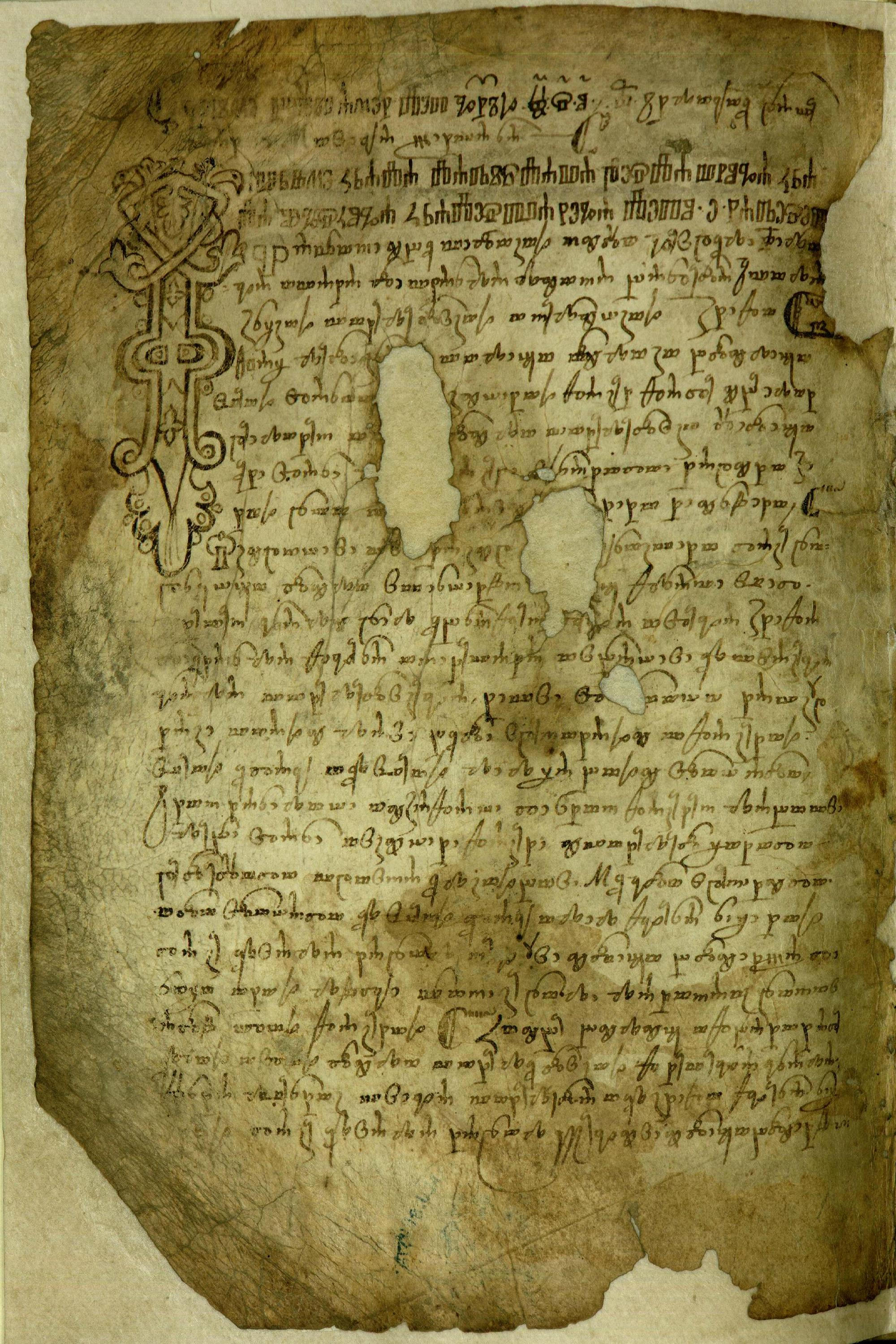
The first line of the Vinodol statute includes the year 1280 written as ·Ⱍ҃·Ⱄ҃·Ⱁ҃· (16th century copy of the statute).

Glagolitic numerals are a numeral system derived from the Glagolitic script, generally agreed to have been created in the 9th century by Saint Cyril. They are similar to Cyrillic numerals, except that numeric values are assigned according to the native alphabetic order of the Glagolitic alphabet. Use of Glagolitic script and numerals declined through the Middle Ages and by the 17th century Glagolitic was used almost only in religious writings. It is unclear if the use of Glagolitic numerals persisted as long as the use of Glagolitic script.

== General description ==
The system is a decimal alphabetic numeral system, with values assigned in alphabetical order, so Ⰰ [ɑ] = 1, Ⰱ [b] = 2, and so forth. Glyphs for the ones, tens, and hundreds values are combined additively to form numbers, for example, ⰗⰑⰂ is 500 + 80 + 3 or 583. Numbers are written from left to right, highest value at the left. As with Cyrillic numerals, between 11 and 19 the ordinary sign order is reversed, so the numbers 11 through 19 are typically written with the ones digit before the glyph for 10; for example ⰅⰊ is 6 + 10, making 16, this reflects the Slavic lexical numerals for the teens.

For numbers greater than 999, there is conflicting evidence. As the earliest version of the Glagolitic alphabet had 36 characters, there are indications of the use of Glagolitic letters for 1000 through 9000, although the validity of 3000 and greater is questioned. There is also evidence of the use of a thousands sign, similar to the lower-left keraia in Greek numerals or the Cyrillic thousands sign to mark numbers greater than 999.

To distinguish numbers from text, numerals are typically set apart with dots or a mark is placed over the numbers. For example, the Missale Romanum Glagolitice printed in 1483, uses both dots around and a titlo over letters in places to indicate a number, as does the Vinodol statute.

Example: (·Ⱍ҃·Ⱄ҃·Ⱁ҃·) – 1280

== Table of values ==
| Value | Glagolitic |
|---|---|
| 1 | Ⰰ |
| 2 | Ⰱ |
| 3 | Ⰲ |
| 4 | Ⰳ |
| 5 | Ⰴ |
| 6 | Ⰵ |
| 7 | Ⰶ |
| 8 | Ⰷ |
| 9 | Ⰸ |

| Value | Glagolitic | |
|---|---|---|
| 10 | or | Ⰺ or Ⰹ |
| 20 | | Ⰻ |
| 30 | | Ⰼ |
| 40 | | Ⰽ |
| 50 | | Ⰾ |
| 60 | | Ⰿ |
| 70 | | Ⱀ |
| 80 | | Ⱁ |
| 90 | | Ⱂ |

| Value | Glagolitic |
|---|---|
| 100 | Ⱃ |
| 200 | Ⱄ |
| 300 | Ⱅ |
| 400 | Ⱆ |
| 500 | Ⱇ |
| 600 | Ⱈ |
| 700 | Ⱉ |
| 800 | Ⱋ |
| 900 | Ⱌ |

| Value | Glagolitic |
|---|---|
| 1,000 | Ⱍ |
| 2,000 | Ⱎ |
| 3,000 | Ⱏ |
| 4,000 | Ⱑ |
| 5,000 | Ⱓ |
| 6,000 | ⰵ҃ⱍ҃ |
| 7,000 | ⰶ҃ⱍ҃ |
| 8,000 | ⰸ҃ⱍ҃ |
| 9,000 | Ⱔ |

As noted earlier, the letters associated with number values greater than 999 are uncertain, and different authors have inferred different values (and different orders) for letters towards the end of the Glagolitic alphabet.

== See also ==
- Glagolitic alphabet
- Relationship of Cyrillic and Glagolitic scripts
- Greek numerals
- Cyrillic numerals
- Calculating glagolitic numerals on Wikifunctions
