= List of Glagolitic manuscripts (1500–1599) =

This is a list of manuscripts written in the Glagolitic script in the 16th century.

== List ==
Light red represents manuscripts with Glagolitic only in inclusions or paratext.
Pale red represents mixed manuscripts with Glagolitic as a main script.

Type	Abbreviation	Date	Designation	Library	Place of origin	Folia	Dimensions	Columns and rows	Notes	Scans
		1500s-1700s	Ms 2039	NUK		97			Knjiga lovranskega kapitlja. Paper.	DSK
		1500–1522, about 1590	II d 123/a III	Arhiv HAZU		1	27 x 18 cm		Veprinački zapisi.	
constitution		1501, 1506, 1507	II d 123/a VII	Arhiv HAZU		1	27 x 18 cm		Veprinački statut. One photograph in Štefanić 1970. Bibliography:	
		1503–1507	II d 123/a IV	Arhiv HAZU		1	26.5 x 18 cm		Veprinački zapisi.	
		1503	Cod. Slav. 78	Austrian National Library		153	19.7 x 14.5 cm		Kenzelreden (Predigten, Tumačenja evanđelja). Scribe: Toma Petrinić. Gospel commentary. Photocopy in Zagreb by 1955. Bibliography:	ÖNB
		1504–1506	II d 123/a V	Arhiv HAZU		1	27 x 18 cm		Veprinački zapisi.	
constitution		1510, 1566	II d 123/a IX	Arhiv HAZU		1			Veprinački statut. Bibliography:	
christenings, confirmations, marriages, deaths		1594–1794	IX 30	Arhiv HAZU	Punat	97	28.5-30.5 x 19.5-21 cm		Christenings (1594–1735), marriages (1633–1725), deaths (1658–1694, 1697–1787, 1791–1794), confirmations (1655–1728).	FS
		1594	II d 123/a X	Arhiv HAZU		1	25 x 16 cm		Veprinački zapisi.	
		1506, 1508	II d 123/a XI	Arhiv HAZU		1	25.8 x 17.5 cm		Veprinački zapisi.	
		1650	II d 123/a XII	Arhiv HAZU		2	30.3 x 20.7 cm		Veprinački zapisi.	
		1650	II d 123/a XIII	Arhiv HAZU		1			Veprinački zapisi.	
		1526–1552	Fragm. glag. 107	Arhiv HAZU					Pet odlomaka veprinačkih zapisnika. First four pieces given to Kukuljević by chaplain Jakov Volčić. Fifth found by Stjepan Ivšić 6 May 1927 among Lopašić's transcriptions.	
		1539	II c 77/e1	Arhiv HAZU		19			Veprinački zapisi.	
		1589, 1621	S.f.48 /4.5 (SF-48)	NUK		2			Veprinački zapisi.	IzSt (2017 from NUK)
		1589-1581	II c 77/e2-3	Arhiv HAZU		20+18+1	29.8 x 20.5 cm		Veprinački zapisi. Two bindings. Earliest dated 8 August 1589.	
		1598–1599, 1600, 1602	II c 77/e4-5	Arhiv HAZU		20	29.8 x 20.5 cm		Veprinački zapisi. Two bindings. Begins 19 January 1599. One photograph in Štefanić 1970.	
		1607–1612, 1618	II c 77/e6-7	Arhiv HAZU		20			Veprinački zapisi. Two bindings.	
		1626–1629	II c 77/e8	Arhiv HAZU		24	30 x 20 cm		Veprinački zapisi.	
		1659–1662	II c 77/e9	Arhiv HAZU		16	31.6 x 21.6 cm		Veprinački zapisi.	
legal		1500 (about)		Arhiv HAZU	Senj				Knez Bartol Frankapan daje senjskom kaptolu selo Župan hlm, a kaptol se zato obvezuje, da će svake nedjelje služiti po tri mise za kneza Bartola i za njegove rodjake. Survives only in transcription. A Glagolitic transcription made around 1500 (possibly around 1575) from an original dated 3 June 1488. Once housed in arhiv senjskoga kaptola.>	
legal		1500 (January 19)	Novljanski samostan collection Fasc. 1, br. 21	HDA	Brinje	1	29 x 19 cm	1 co	Knez Anž Frankapan daruje fratrom u Zažićnu polovicu gračćine u Velikih Psivićih i njeke sjenokoše. A Latinic transcription also survives. Moved from Hrv.-slav. zem. arkiv to Budapest as sign. 37123 then returned.	
legal		1500 (April 25)		Senj (arhiv senjskoga kaptola)	Senj	1	23 x 13 cm	1 co	Senjski kapitan odgovara vikaru senjskomu, da Cesarica spada na grad Senj, kako je knez Frankapan odlučio. Survives only in Glagolitic transcription contemporary with original.	
deed		1500 (? 27)	Pavlinski samostan u Strezi, br. 30	HDA	Bović (Sisak)	1	21 x 16 cm	1	Pred Pavlom Pučićem, sucem Bovićana, Domjan Turčinić prodaje neke zemljišne posjede Valentu Puciću, a koji također kupuje zemljoposjede i od nekih drugih osoba u bovićkom kotaru. Once kept at Budapest in M.D.A. as sign. M.O.D.L. 37124.	
legal		1501 (August 18, 21)		Senj (arhiv senjskoga kaptola)	Lika and Bužani	5		1 co	Povjerenik senjskoga kaptola i kraljevski čovjek slušaju rotnike, koji odbijaju od kneza Gašpara Perušića uvredu, kojom ga je uvriedio Martinko Banovac. A copy contemporary with the original.	
legal		1501 (October 29)	Samostan sv. Jelene collection, br. 14	HDA	?				Mikula Jurinić iz sela Pothuma ostavlja svoj mlin u Košićkom kotaru samostanu Sv. Jelene kod Senja.	
ritual, rule, chronicle	RitKlim	1501–1512	n/a	Saint Xavier Monastery of the Third Order of Saint Francis in Zagreb	Croatia	234	11.8 x 7.8 cm		Klimantovićev obrednik (Klimantović ritual). Besides the ritual, it also contains the Rule of Saint Francis, and 13 hymns. Photocopies in Zagreb by 1952, DVD in Staroslavenski institut (DVD 19). Bibliography:	
legal		1502 (May 8)	N. R. A. Fasc. 1650. No. 8	HDA	Strelče				Bratja Benšići poklanjaju svoju sjenokošu Vidasu Štefliniću iz Korenice. Pachment.	
legal		1475 (September 15), 1502	Crikvenički samostan collection br. 13	HDA	Otočac	1	27 x 21 cm	1 co	Knez Martin Frankapan daruje remetam crikveničkim selo Črmanj kal. Survives in 1502 transcription. Once housed at Budapest under sg. M.O.D.L. 37116. Parchment.	
legal		1503 (July 2)		Senj (arhiv senjskoga kaptola)	Lagodušići (Lika)	1	22 x 26 cm	1 co	Blaž Baromić, senjski kanonik, i kraljevski čovjek Grgur Lepečić slušaju svjedoke proti ljudem kneza Mihovila. Survives in transcription. A copy contemporary with the original.	
legal		1504 (February 2 or 3)	N. R. A. Fasc. 1650. No. 9	HDA	Stelnično				Knez Andrija Blažičević daruje jedan vrt Vidasu Štefliniću. Parchment.	
legal		1504 (March 1)	Remetski samostan collection sv. 4. br. 7	HDA	Marinci				Oporuka Margite udove kneza Boltižara Mikčevečkoga, kojom ostavlja pavlinom u Remetah ves Marince.	
legal		1504 (March 14)	Pavlinski samostan u Crikvenici, br. 19	HDA	na Ospu pod Novim				Ivan Banić daruje remetam crikveničkim jednu zemlju. Parchment. Scribe: Filip Pilušinović.	1983 (2006)
legal		1505 (November 2)			Okić				Mavar Fabjanić prodaje jednu njivu Mati Štefaniću. Acquired by Kukuljević.	
		1506 (28 August 1506)	IV a 99	Arhiv HAZU		103	20.6 x 15.6 cm		Peregrinov blagdanar, rukopis popa Andrija. Scribe: Andrij of Novi Vinodolski. He finished on 28 August 1506. Cinnabar of f. 31 on added by fra Stipan of the island of Krk. Book intended for Ivan Pažanin prior of the pavlinski samostan sv. Marije na Ospu by Novi Vinodolski. Possibly from among those Pavlini expelled from the Glavotok monastery sv. Marije on Krk in 1481. It ended up at Glavotok eventually. Once housed at the Biblioteca del Seminario Teologico in Gorizia as sign. 90 "Manoscritto glagolitico". The transcription was from a book by his contemporary Filip of Novi Vinodlski.	IzSt (2008), IzSt (2008)
legal		1506 (October 9)			Bag				Bernardin Mirković izjavljuje, da su ga izplatili fratri u Zažitnu za trsje, koje im je prodao. Acquired by Kukuljević.	
		1507–1698, 1745	br. 3	Vrbnik (župni ured)	Vrbnik	110	29.8 x 21 cm		Kapitulska knjiga instrumenata.	
deed		1507	DMV 670	HDA	Draganić				Matej Kosić sa svojim sinom Tomašem prodaju zemljište Mavru i Družetu Franetić. Parchment.	
legal		1508 (October 26)		Senj (arhiv senjskoga kaptola)	Šćitari (Bužani)	1		1 co	Povjerenik senjskoga kaptola javlja, što su izpovjedili porotnici u parni Nemanićah i Škvarićah s njihovim protivnikom (Petrom Daroićem). Survives in transcription. A copy contemporary with the original.	
miscellany	CKlim_{2} (CKlim_{1509})	1509?	Bč 2	National Library of Russia	Croatia	33	12.3 x 8.3 cm		Drugi Klimantovićev zbornik (Klimantović ritual). Discovered by Ivan Berčić on Krk (probably in Glavotok monastery). Includes a Franjevačka regula. Photocopy in Zagreb made on 29 May 1958 in Saint Petersburg. Bibliography:	IzSt (2008), IzSt (2008), IzSt (2008)
legal		1509 (May 10)		Senj (arhiv senjskoga kaptola)	Senj	1	22 x 32 cm	1 co	Dva senjska kanonika izjavljuju pred kaptolom, da će biti poruci za popa Gašpara Turčića, koji je bio u uzi u modruškoga vikara Pavla Polovića. Survives in transcription. A copy contemporary with the original.	
ritual		1509 (December 17)	Berčićevo sobranje br. 2	Petersburg (гос. публ. библиотека)	Sali?	33	12.3 x 8.3 cm		Obrednik iz 1509. Written by the same Klimantović who wrote the ritual br. 1 in this collection and the ritual in Sv. Ksaver in Zagreb.	
legal		1509	N. R. A. Fasc. 203. No. 13	HDA					Glagolitic signature of Stefan Berslavić on Latinic document.	
legal		1510 (February 13)		Senj (arhiv senjskoga kaptola)	Otočac?				Porotnici svjedoče, da je Jelena Keglevićka, udovica Jurja Mikuličića, darovala kanonikom crkve otočke dva ždrieba zemlje u Kračanu. Survives in transcription (contemporary or later not noted). A photocopy existed.	
legal		1510 (April 5)		Senj (arhiv senjskoga kaptola)	Otočac	1	22 x 18 cm	1 co	Andrija Bot, ban hrvatski i kapitan senjski, nalaže senjskomu kaptolu, da odredi jednoga kanonika, koji će s kraljevim čovjekom biti kod rotjenja u parni Nemanićah s Daroići. Scribe same as 18 April 1510 document also from Otočac.	
legal		1510 (April 9)		Senj (arhiv kaptola senjskoga)	Perušić	1		1 co	Tečaj paruice Nemanićah i Škvarićah s Petrom Daroićem na bužkom sudu pred povjerenikom senjskoga kaptola i kraljevskim čovjekom. Survives in both original and contemporary transcription.	
legal		1510 (April 18)		Senj (arhiv senjskoga kaptola)	Otočac	1			Andrija Bot, ban hrvatski i kapitan senjski, nalaže kaptolu senjskomu, da odredi jednoga kanonika, koji će s kraljevim čovjekom biti kod rotjenja u parni Nemanićah i Škvarićah s Daroići. Scribe same as 14 April 1510 document.	
legal		1510 (April 19)		Senj (arhiv senjskoga kaptola)	Otočac	1		1 co	Andrija Bot, ban hrvatski i kapitan senjski, nalaže senjskomu kaptolu, da odredi jednoga kanonika, koji će biti s kraljevim čovjekom na rotjenju u parni Petra Daroića s Nemanići i Škvarići. Scribe same as 14 and 18 April 1510 documents.	
legal		1510 (April 22)		Senj (arhiv senjskoga kaptola)	Lika	1		1 co	Povjerenik senjskoga kaptola Barak dolazi s kraljevim čovjekom Juretom Piščićem, da slušaju porotnike u parni Petra Daroića s Nemanići i Škvarići. Ovi posljednji neće da dadu porotnikah; zato Petar poziva svoje porotnike pred kraljevski sud. Survives in contemporary transcription.	
legal		1510 (July 8)		Senj (arhiv senjskoga kaptola)	Lika-Krbava	1		1 co	Porotnici svjedoče Humčanom za njihovu plemenštinu.	
miscellany	CEus	1511	сб. на П. И. Щукин No 511	GIM-Moskva	Putna Monastery	158			Among other scripts, Glagolitic is used cryptographically by author protopsalt Evstatij in this Greek-Slavic language manuscript.	
legal		1511 (August 4)		Senj (arhiv senjskoga kaptola)	Novo selo (Lika)	1		1 co	Povjerenik senjskoga kaptola svjedoči, kako je pred njim i pred kraljevim čovjekom a na sudu bužkom Vitko Andrijašević Jurju Piščiću vratio ono, u čem se je bio mienjao Vitkov stric s Jurjem. Nemogavši pako Juraj naplatiti Vitka, dobi ovaj Jurjevu plemenštinu u zalog. Survives in transcription.	
legal		1511 or 1512		Senj (arhiv senjskoga kaptola)	Marinci (Bužani)				Porotnici svjedoče pred bužkim sudom, da Pedniće ide tretji dio Marinacah. Survives in transcription.	
collection of indulgences	CKlim_{1513}	1511 or within 1502–1513	R 3368 (old SM 32 F 20)	NSK	Croatia	100	15.5 x 11.3 cm	1 co	Zbirka indulgencija. By scribe Šimun Klimantović. Bound to a Latin printed book from 1502, which it is a translation of. Bibliography:	NSK
legal		1512 (January 26, 27)		Senj (arhiv senjskoga kaptola)	Strijane (Sinj)	1		3 co	Povjerenik senjskoga kaptola kazuje, kako su rotnici pred njim i pred kraljevim čovjekom izpovjedili, da su sudci proti zakonu uveli Pednića u Novakovićevu plemenštinu. Survives in transcription contemporary with original.	
legal		1512 (26, 27)			Strijane (Sinj)	1			Povjerenik senjskog kaptola ponovo piše o protuzakonitom uvođenju Pednića u Novakovićev plemićki posjed. Survives in transcription contemporary with original. Same scribe as other Strijane document from this year.	
legal		1512 (February 6)			Belaj (Lika)				Porotnici svjedoče, da Jurjevce ide tretji dio Nekorićah. Survives in transcription contemporary with original.	
legal		1512 (February 6)		Senj (arhiv senjskoga kaptola)	Lika				Zastupnik Jurjevacah poziva suparnika im na kraljevski sud. Survives in transcription.	
legal		1512		pismohrana senjskoga kaptola	Srijane				Povjerenik senjskoga kaptola kazuje, kako su plemeniti ljudi pred njim i pred kraljevim čovjekom zabacili odluku sudacah, koju su ovi bili učinili u parni Pednića s Novakovićem. Survives in transcription. Srav. listinu od 1512. 26. siečnja.	
legal		1513 (May 2)		Ljubljana (knjižnica franjevačke provincije sv. Križa)	Senj	1	39.5 x 23.5 cm	1 co	Senjski kaptol kao vjerodostojno mjesto prepisuje, na zamolbu franjevca Ivana Vranića, nekoliko isprava koje sadrže presude sudaca i rotnika ličkog stola u nekim sporovima.	
legal		1513 (October 10)		Senj (arhiv senjskoga kaptola)	Kasezi	2		4 co	Porotnici izpoviedaju, kako su špani silu učinili Grgi Surliću u njegovoj parni s Jurjem Mišlenovićem. Survives in transcription contemporary with original.	
demarcation		1513 (October 10)		Senj (arhiv senjskoga kaptola)	Novo selo (Lika)				Opisanje medjah Pavla i Matije Prhonića. Survives in transcription contemporary with original. Scribe same as 1513 Kasezi document.	
		1513–1521	II d 123/a II	Arhiv HAZU		1	26.2 x 17.2 cm		Veprinački zapisi.	
legal		1513	N. R. A. Fasc. 1650. No. 10	HDA	Stenično				Knez Jurko Pisac kupuje zemlju od udovice Pavla Benclina, pred sudcem steničkim Mikulom Antonovićem. Pachment.	
deed		1513	DMV 733	HDA	Draganić				Tomaš Bencetić i drugovi prodaju svoje zemljište Mavru i Družetu Franetić i njihovim sinovima. Parchment.	
ritual		1514 (12 September)	Berčićevo sobranje br. 1	Petersburg (гос. публ. библиотека)		72	14.6 x 9.5 cm	Sali	Obrednik iz 1514. Once owned by the parish church in Sali, acquired by Berčić through a student from Sali. Probably written by the same Klimantović who wrote the ritual kept at Sv. Ksaver in Zagreb and the ritual br. 2 of the Berčić collection.	
legal		1514 (October 28)		Senj (arhiv senjskoga kaptola)	Bužani	2			Članovi ličkog i buškog rotnog stola svjedoče pod zakletvom da su dobit od najma mlinova za mljevenje žita u Plusišću popola dijelili Perušić i knez Ivan Cetinski, i da je Perušićeva samo jedna obala vode.	
legal		1514 (November 8)		collection of I. Črnčić	Sužan				Bratovština u Sužanu gradi i nadaruje crkvu Svih svetih. Acquired by priest I. Črnčić from judge of Sužan.	
legal		1514 (March 24)			Novi Vinodolski				Fratar Grgur, vikar samostana na Gvozda, daje meštru Valentu jednu hižu u nasljedni najam. Acquired by Kukuljević.	
		1515–1530, 1532	II d 44 (Kuk. 334)	Arhiv HAZU		57			Veprinački zapisi 1515–1530. Last seen by Strohal.	
Summula Confessionalis	MisLab	1518 (about)	Borgiano illirico 11	Vatican Library		122			Summula Confessionalis of Antonino Pierozzi; Egzorcizmi s legendom o sv. Sisiniju (15th century?). A microfilm was made by the NSK before 1952.	IzSt (2008)
		1518–1526	II d 123/a I	Arhiv HAZU		1	26.3 x 18 cm		Veprinački zapisi.	
legal		1518 (June 21)		pismohrana senjskoga kaptola	Senj				Senjski kaptol svjedoči, kako je Ivan Pednić pred povjerenici istoga kaptola pokazao senjskim kapetanom njeke kraljevske listove. Survives in transcription.	
deed		1519 (February 3)	DMV 797	HDA	Draganić				Ilija Slučić prodaje imanje u Pešćaru Mateju Franetiću. Parchment.	
deed		1519	DMV 798	HDA	Draganić				France Krajačić prodaje svoje selo Luku Franetićima. Parchment.	
legal		1520 (about)		Senj (arhiv senjskoga kaptola)	Senj	1	23 x 17 cm		Jelena udovica Jurčaca Gusića posinjuje kneza Mihajla Turka. Survives in tranacription contemporary with original.	
ledger		1520–1642	VII 89	Arhiv HAZU	Zabrežec (Dolina)	102	21.5 x 15.5 cm		Kvadirna bratovštine sv. Antuna u Zabrešcu (Dolina kraj Trsta). Glagolitic to 1610 then Latinic from 1611. Kept in the parish Dolina as late as 1910, but once examined by Jakov Volčić. Acquired by JAZU im 1930, likely sent by Božo Milanović. Bibliography:	
will		1521 (January 16)	Pavlinski samostan u Crikvenici, br. 20	HDA	Crikvenica				Will of Antun Bošnjak of Ponikve (Oporuka Antuna Bošnjaka iz Ponikava). Paper.	
legal		1521 (March 13)		Senj (arhiv senjskoga kaptola)	Senj	1			Senjski kaptol svjedoči, da su se knez Grgur Orlovčić i Jerolim Petelinić, bivši prije u borbi, tako utakmili, da im kralj pravdu skroji, a dotle da budu u primirju, kojemu su ubjeti točnije označeni.	
legal		1521 (April 18)	Crikvenički samostan br. 21	HDA	Senj (Monastery of sv. Spas)				Tomaš, provincijal pavlinski, daje Pavlu Gržiću i Mavri Zoričiću jednu zemlju u nasljedni najam. Parchment.	
legal		1521 (July 3)		pismohrana senjskoga kaptola	Senj				Senjski kaptol daje na znanje, kako je Martinu Vrbaniću predana njegova plemenština u Tožićih, koja mu je bila bezpravno oteta. Survives in transcription.	
legal		1521	Crikvenički samostan collection br. 22	HDA	Monastery of sv. Spas				Fratar Tomaš, vikar hrvatskih pavlinah na Gvozdu, daje Bariću Paviziću njekakvu zemlju u nasljedni najam. Survives in Glagolitic transcription. Paper. Latinic copy exists. Includes Glagolitic regest note.	
		1523–1611			Roč				Knjiga crkve i bratovštine sv. Bartolomeja. Facsimile published 2006.	
cartulary		1523–1528	Diplomatarium, sign. II 351.241, Manuscrriptum II 796 latinum	Vienna (University Library)					Diplomatarium Augustinskoga samostana u Rijeci. Glagolitic translations for no. 63, 67, 68 of Latin documents (pages 100r, 1023-104r) written 21 April 1429 and 4 February 1528. Scribe: notary priest Ivan Barberić (who signed it in 1523). Bibliography:	IzSt
legal		1523 (July 20)			Roč				Redovnici sv. Benedikta bilježe crkveni potrošak za djelo stolara meštra Jeronima iz Mletakah. Acquired by Kukuljević from the sv. Bartul church in Roč.	
legal		1523 (September 2)		Senj (arhiv senjskoga kaptola)	Senj	1	24 x 23 cm		Senjski kapitan Grgur Orlovčić nalaže senjskomu kaptolu, da pošalje jednoga kanonika s kraljevim čovjekom Ivanom Mikulaićem, koji bi saslušao po kraljevskoj naredbi Krstu i Vuka Frankapana.	
grant		1523 (October 3)	Pavlinski samostan u Crikvenici, br. 23	HDA	Crikvenica				Tomaš, vikar samostana Sv. Mikule na Gvozdu i provincijal pavlinski daje Jurini Velačići zemlju u nasljedni najam. Parchment.	
		1524–1526	III d 1 (Kuk. 1016)	Arhiv HAZU	Šćitarjevo	14	29.5 x 11 cm		Bilježnica šćitarjevačkog župnika. Parchment cover is a bifolium from a Latin missal. Scribe was a parish priest in Šćitarjevo. It is the northernmost completely Glagolitic manuscript by place of origin with certainty with the exception of the work of the Czech Glagolitic monks. Acquired by Kukuljević. One photograph in Štefanić 1970.	
legal		1525 (December 20)	N. R. A. Fasc. 1650. No. 11	HDA	Modruš				Knez Brnardin Frankapan izkupljuje grad Dubovac od Grgura Štefkovića, komu ga bješe dao za miraz sa kćerju svojom Veronikom, te mu daje selo Vinicu. Parchment.	
protocol		1526–1527			Baška	10			Fragmenat notarskog protokola Ivana Mantakovića 1526–1527. Scribe: Ivan Mantaković. Last possessed by parish priest Mate Oršić in Vrh by Krk. Not seen since. Attached was a folio with two legal acts (31 October and 5 November 1527), now Arhiv HAZU sign. fragm. glag. 130.	
ledger		1526–1611, 1566–1628	II c 56 (Kuk. 838)	Arhiv HAZU	Roč	284	30.5 x 10.5 cm		Knjiga računa bratovštine (crkve) i općine Roč. Mostly Glagolitic with some Italian in the late 16th and early 17th centuries, but last Glagolitic entry in 1610 and Italian only from 1611 on. Divided into book A (f. 1–173, 1526–1611) and book B (f. 174–276, 1566–1628). Acquired by Kukuljević. One photograph in Štefanić 1970.	
legal		1526 (August 15)		Senj (arhiv kaptola senjskoga)	Senj	1	27 x 22 cm		Senjski kaptol prima u svoje knjige ugovor kneza Grgura Orlovčića i kneza Petra Kružića, kojim se ustanovljuje, da u slučaju izumrtja obitelji jednoga izmedju njih preostala obitelj nasliedi sve imanje izumrle. Survives in transcription.	
legal		1526 (September 5)		carski tajni arkiv in Vienna	Zagreb				Knez Krištofor Frankapan piše senjskomu biskupu Franji Jožefiću, zašto nije mogao prispjeti k Mohaču, zatim svjetuje, kako bi valjalo zemlju braniti od Turakah.	
legal		1526 (October 18)		novljanski župnik Žanić	Novi Vinodolski				Domin Matko Duplić zapisuje, po volji svoga strica Antona, jednu kuću plovanu i redovnikom novogradskim.	
protocol		1526–1527	Fragm. glag. 130	Arhiv HAZU		1	29 x 22 cm		List notarskog protokola Ivana Mantakovića.	
legal		1527 (March 13)		carska pridvorna tajna pismohrana in Vienna	Segežd				Franjo Jozefić, senjski biskup, piše knezu Krištoforu Frankapanu i uvjerava ga o svojoj odanosti.	
legal		1527 (May 29)		imperial archive in Vienna	Križevci				Knez Krištofor Frankapan piše list senjskomu biskupu Franji Jožefiću, u kom se tuži, da ga Zapolja slabo pomaže; javlja, da je Denj izgubljen; kudi Kešeria; priobćuje zaključke križevačkoga sabora.	
legal		1527 (June 14)		carski tajni arkiv in Vienna	Velika				Knez Krištofor Frankapan piše senjskomu biskupu Franji Jožefiću, da se Senj još drži; da su njega (Krištofora) gledali privući na stranu Ferdinandovu; da Zapolji idu u pomoć kralj francezki i englezki, da su njeka gospoda hrvatska prisegla Ferdinandu.	
legal		1527 (14 July)		Senj (arhiv senjskoga kaptola)	Posedarje	4			Povjerenik senjskogu kaptola i kraljev čovjek slušaju svjedoke, koji svjedoče, da knez Juraj Posedarski nije predao Turkom grada Obrovca. Survives in transcription. Text includes transcription of a 13 August 1526 letter written by lord Ivan Karlović of Krbava in Mutnica (Lika) to Jurah Posedarski commander of Obrovac to not abandon the city.	
legal		1527 (July 31)		carski tajni arkiv in Vienna	Tabor by Ivanić				Knez Krištofor Frankapan piše senjskomu biskupu Franji Jožefiću, što bi valjalo činiti, da se Hrvatska predobije za Zapolju.	
will		1527 (November 20)		Vrbnik (župni arhiv)	Senj	1	28 x 21 cm		Will of priest Matija Baromić (Oporuka popa Matija Baromića). Survives in Glagolitic transcription by Papić contemporary with original or at least from 16th century. Matija Baromić was related to Blaž Baromić. Discovered by Stjepan Ivšić in the fragment of a book in Vrbnik.	1954 [partial]
legal		1527 (December 18)		pismohrana senjskoga kaptola	Ostrog				Kralj Ferdinand daje senjskomu kaptolu pravo kanonike izbirati.	
legal		1527		Ljudevit Gaj personal library	kotar gradački				Ljudi kotara gradačkoga povtrdjuju Andriji Kuševiću njegovo imanje.	
		1528–1532 (within)		Arhiv HAZU	Rijeka	2	29x10.5 cm		Popis riječkih imena pisan glagoljicom. Likely a list of members of the city council. Acquired by Kukuljević at Capuchin Monastery in Rijeka. Paper. Bibliography:	
miscellany		1529–1557	I a 25 (Kuk. 329)	Arhiv HAZU	Galevac, Zadar	87	13.8 x 9.5 cm		Zbornik Šimuna Glavića. Scribe was Šimun Glavić for f. 8-43v, 46–62, 66–74, 76–84. The rest was written in a younger hand. Glavić was not a scribe by profession but was a notable Franciscan, three times the head of the dalmatinsko-istarska provincija. He died after 1564. He wrote most of it by 1529 when he finished the main part of the text, and the rest later. He carried the chronicle down to 1557. It was written on Galevac and in Zadar, then carried from monastery to monastery, including Koper, Dubašnica and Omišalj. Acquired by Kukuljević by 1856. One photograph in Štefanić 1970. Bibliography:	IzSt (2008)
legal		1529 (July 2)	Pavlinski samostan u Lepoglavi, br. 53	HDA					A Glagolitic note by priest Petar, plebanuš Sv. Klare (by Zagreb), exists on this document.	
legal		1529 (July 17)		carski tajni arkiv in Vienna	Dubrovnik				Senjski kanonik Tomaš piše knezu Ivanu Obrdanči, da će Arbanasi i Srblji pomoći ratna nastojanja krštanjah; zatim opisuje silu vojske Sulejmanove.	
constitution		1500s (beginning)	II d 123/a VIII	Arhiv HAZU		1	26.5 x 16.5 cm		Veprinački statut. Bibliography:	
16 prophets		1500s (beginning)	Čudovskija manastir collection 14/184	RGB-Moskva	Russia	427			16 Prophets with commentary. Cyrillic with Glagolitic in titles (folia 70v, 71v, 894) and initials (>25 examples).	
lectionary		1500s (beginning)	no signature as of 1995	Gorizia (Seminario Teologico)		29	19.4 x 15 cm		Gorizia lectionary (Gorički lekcionary).	
		1500s (beginning)	IV a 80/34	Arhiv HAZU	Istria?	2	14.5 x 10 cm		Odlomak Poslanice o nedjelji. Scribe ekavian, possibly from Istria, likely Franciscam,	
Antoninus Florentinus, Summula confessionis	MisKlim^{1513}	1500s (beginning)	R 3362	NSK	Croatia	72	21.1 x 15 cm	1 co	Antonin.	NSK
legal		1500s (beginning)		Senj (arhiv senjskoga kaptola)	Brinje				Senjski kaptol prepisuje jedan list kneza Jurja Kosinjskoga, koji je ovomu dan od kneza Anža Frankapana rad posudbe grada Kosina. 1489 original lost, but survives in early 16th century transcript by the same scribe responsible for the transcript of the 13 February 1499 document, likewise commissioned by Ivan Lacković.	
legal		1500s (beginning)		Senj (arhiv senjskoga katpola)	Senj				Senjski kaptol prepisuje na prošnju kneza Ivana Lackovića, sina Jurja Kosinskoga, jednu listinu, u kojoj knez Anž Frankapan govori, kako se je mienjao s Jurjem Kosinskim, davši mu za Kosin Zahumlje. Survives only in transcription. Original dated 13 February 1499. Survives only in transcript from beginning of 16th century made at request of Ivan Lacković.	
ritual		1520s	Berčićevo sobranje br. 4	Petersburg (гос. публ. библиотека)	Žman?	6	9.8 x 7.4 cm		Odlomak obrednika. Discovered by Berčić in Žman. Scribe: Andrija Čučković. Parchment. Bibliography:	
miscellany	CTk	1500s (first decades)	IV a 120	Arhiv HAZU		171	14 x 10.3 cm		Tkonski zbornik (Tkon miscellany). Written somewhere from Vinodol to Ozalj by a single scribe with the possible exception of f. 67-98 and f. 162–169. Certainly at least by scribes of the same school. Possibly written by a single scribe with varied handwriting over time. Bibliography:	IzSt (2008)
deed confirmation		1500s (first decades)		Arhiv HAZU	Tržić				Bužki stol daje list Jurju Pedniću iz Marinacah, koji je kao bližnji kupio njeku zemlju Antuna Ratkovića, koju je ovaj bio izgubio za osud. Original dated 18 February 1450 lost. Survives in transcription from first decades of 16th century. Formerly in the pismohrana senjskoga kaptola.	
grant		1531 (February 12)	Glagolitica II-2	HDA	Kastav				Petru Furiću njegova sestra Perpeta daje svoj dio očinstva.	IzSt (2008)
legal		1533			Draganići				Mihalj Bencetić, draganićki župan, dobiva na prikaz jedno zemljište. Acquired by Kukuljević.	
protocol		1534–1764	Glagolitica II	HDA	Croatia				53 isprave. Includes multiple manuscripts.	
legal		1534 (January 2)			Veprinac				Obćina veprinačka prodaje njeke zemlje Kirinu Zubaliću. Acquired by Kukuljević.	
legal		1534 (April 2)	Glagolitica II-3	HDA	Pokupsko				Ugovor između kneza Petra Keglevića i Stipana Strizoja glede prokulabije grada Pokupsko.	IzSt (2008)
legal		1534	Pavlinski samostan u Crikvenici, inter Miscellanea	HDA	Jastrebarsko				Stipe i Lacko iz Jastrebarske prodaju svoje trsje Stjepanu Vrbaniću. Parchment.	
legal		1535 (April 26)		pismohrana Samuila Keglevića in Lobor	Topusko				Stol topuški svjedoči Gerguru satniku, da nije zaostao biršagom, što je bacio sumnju na njekoga.	
legal		1535	Pavlinski samostan u Crikvenici, inter Miscellanea	HDA	Jastrebarsko				Benko Galović prodaje komad trsja Stjepanu Vrbaniću. Parchment.	
deed		1535	Glagolitica II-4	HDA	Gaza (Karlovac)				Jure Škirin, Jure Slipčić i Jure Marčac prodaju svoja zemljišta plebanušu Jurju.	IzSt (2008)
legal		1536 (December 6)	sv. 5. br. 47	HDA	Bović				Putanići kupuju imanja.	
legal		1537 (December 8)	Glagolitica II-5	HDA	Kastav				Frančisko Kokrušić izjavljuje da je njegova žena Domeniga prodala jednu zemlju Petru Furiću.	IzSt (2008)
legal		1537	J. No. 54	Zagreb	Strilci				Grge Levak prodaje lapat svoje plemenštine Jandriju Domjaniću.	
legal		1538	Glagolitica II-6	HDA	Pécs/Pečno				Lovrinac Cogulić prodaje vinograd i zemlju Vidaku iz Perne. Found in a copper vessel in Ortaháza, sent to Pecs. A transcription was published by I. Šafařík in Danica 1840, br. 26.	IzSt (2008)
		1539–1623	III c 23	Arhiv HAZU	Grobnik	134	35.6 x 12.5 cm		Blagajnička knjiga "brašćine" crkve sv. Marije u Grobniku. Completely Glagolitic with Latin only for some later notes from the 18th century. But there are also Glagolitic notes, the latest dated 1771 by fra Šime Lapčić on f. 111v. One photograph in Štefanić 1970.	
grant		1539	Pavlinski samostan u crikvenici, br. 25	HDA	?				Pavlin Juraj Vikariš daje u najam zemlju Beku, zetu Matka Ročišća. Paper.	
		1541	IV a 95	Arhiv HAZU		178	19.8 x 15.2 cm		Knjige "Disipula". Written by same scribe as sign. VIII 126, thus Mihovil parish priest of Belgrad (in Vinodol). Acquired by Ivan Berčić in 1852. Acquired by JAZU with his library in 1895, sent by Ivan's brother Antun Berčić from Zadar on 22 July 1895. One photograph in Štefanić 1970. Bibliography:	IzSt (2008)
legal		1541 (February 27)			Lupoglav (Istria)	1			Lupoglavski pop Mihovil Sipa bilježi kodicil, odnosno dopunu zagubljene oporuke Jelene, sestre Petra Kružića. Photograph published on page 333 of Kuzmić 2011.	
legal		1541 (April 27)	N. R. A. Fasc. 74. Nro. 50	HDA	Ozalj				Knez Štefan Frankapan zalaže Svarču Ivanu i Štefanu Gusićem. Survives in Latinic transcription.	
will		1541	IV. 65	Trsat (Franjevački samostan)		2			Testament Jelene, sestre Petra Kružića. Published by Stjepan Ivšić.	
homiliary		1542 (before)	IV a 48/a	Arhiv HAZU		5	20 x 13 cm		Odlomak dissipula. Similar handwriting to CTk. Hand that left the note from 1542 (priest Mihovil son of Anton Burić in Poljane) similar to but not identical to that of the main text.	
missal	MKlimp	1543–1563 (Glagolitic part)	R. V. 28	Győr (Seminary Library)	Klingenbach				Klimpeh Missal (Klimpeški misal). Printed 1501 in Latin but with handwritten Cyrillic marginal notes and a 3 word colophon in Glagolitic. Scribe: Cyrillic by Juraj Vuković of Jastrebarsko, Glagolitic by unknown hand after Vuković. Last dated entry by Vuković from 1564, the first from 1561; as late as 1518 notes were written in the book by German speaking clergy, so the Croat priests are thought to have arrived later. These are the only known examples of either Glagolitic or Cyrillic in pre-modern Burgenland. The Latin book had been acquired by the church in Klimpeh (Klingenbach) in 1504. Already in Győr/Raab by the time it was first described in 1861, though it is unknown exactly when it reached there. Used in many studies on the Burgenland Croats. Bibliography:	2011 (2011)
legal		1542 (January 7)			Pécs				Barbara Krhek piše svomu mužu, kako je Slunjski navalio na Steničnjak. Acquired by Kukuljević.	
legal		1543 (November 2)		pismohrana senjskoga kaptola	Senj				Survives in transcription.	
legal		1543	Glagolitica II-7	HDA	Karlovački kotar				Sudac Ivan Herendić potvrđuje da su gospođa Klara Vojkovića i njezin sin Ivan kupili imanje od Antuna Vlaha.	IzSt (2008)
deed		1544 (August 17)	Glagolitica II-8	HDA	Kastav				Marko Soštarić i njegova kći Manda prodaju kuću Petru Furiću.	IzSt (2008)
legal		1545 (May 7)		NUK	Senj				Martin Gal, kapetan senjski, oglašuje, da će navaliti baša hlivanski na Hrvatsku.	
legal		1545 (June 28)			Krk (town)				Krištofor Tolović, kanonik rabski i vikar krčki, obznanjuje svetjenstvu, da će držati vizitu. Survives in Glagolitic transcription, acquired by Kukuljević.	
legal		1545 (September 13)			Krk (town)				Krištofor Tolović, vikar krčki, zapovieda, da se žakni prije redjenja moraju predanj staviti. Acquired by Kukuljević.	
legal		1545 (September 19)			Krk (town)				Krištofor Tolović, krčki vikar, nalaže vrbničkomu plovanu, da pozove popa Jurja Antončića na izplatu njekakvoga duga. Acquired by Kukuljević.	
burial mass register		1545–1547, 1553–1555	Glagolitica I-5 (I: 1545–1547, V: 1553–1555)	HDA	Rijeka	44	32 x 10.5 cm		Popis misa zadušnica što je obavljao Riječki kaptol (Zapisnik misni kaptola riječkoga, Protokoli Riječkoga kaptola). Multiple scribes; one left initials I. B. on f. 16v (likely notary priest Ivan Barberić). Acquired by Kukuljević as Cod. Cart. N. LXI. Acquired by HDA with ostavština of Ivan Kukuljević. Strohal worked from it around 1910. Photograph of one page in Štefanić 1953, then facsimile with transcription in Deković 2005. Bibliography:	IzSt (2008)
legal		1545 (about)		NUK					Ivan Ručić piše knezu Jandriju Tadioloviću o njekih stvarih.	
		1546–1823		Arhiv Zadarske nadbiskupije	Sali	131	29.3 x 20.5 cm		Libar Braće svete Marije na Salima. Glagolitic with sporadic and Latinic and Italian entries. Formerly at the župni ured of Sali (catalogued as R 1).	GUZ, PB
legal		1546 (April 12)	Zbirka glagoljičnih isprava, III 54	HDA	Rijeka				"Isprava Gverina Tihića". Ivan Premuvić, priur samostana sv. Jerolima na Rieci, kupuje vunu od Pavla Peršulinića. Written in South Čakavian dialect. Scribe was notary Gverin Tranquillus (Tihić), born in Šibenik around 1490, died likely in 1533; wrote mostly in Latin but in this document he showed Glagolitic literacy. He worked in Šibenik as a notary 1513 to his death, excepting 1531–1535 working in Zadar and 1544–1546 working in Rijeka. Text published by Stjepan Ivšić in Starine volume 42, page 109.	
demarcation	PartIst_{m}	1530s	M 82	Rijeka (Historijski arhiv)		31	30.7 x 21 cm		Istarski razvod (Momjanski prijepis). The copy was found 1888 in Momjan and is older than the Kršan copy, dating probably to the 1530s. But both copies were written by the same scribe Levac Križanić. Bibliography:	
demarcation	PartIst_{k}	1546	R 3677	NSK	Kršan, Istria	35	33 x 32 cm	1 co	Istarski razvod (Istrian Demarcation). Both copies were written by the same scribe Levac Križanić. Facsimile published 1989. Bibliography:	NSK, GHR, IzSt (2008), IzSt (2008)
receipts		1547	Glagolitica II-9	HDA	Bakar				Račun Jurja Pećarića o troškovima za popravak krova na crkvi sv. Jurja u Bakru i račun o sabranom novcu za njegova strica.	IzSt (2008)
legal		1547 (September 17)	Glagolitica II-10	HDA	Bakar				Kata, kći pokojnoga Andrije Pećarića izmiruje se sa svojim bratom Jurjem i nagađaju se o podjeli posjeda i isplati dugova.	IzSt (2008)
legal		1549 (January 10)	Samostan sv. Spasa collection br. 23	HDA	Crikvenica				Remete sv. Pavla daju u najam svoju kuću u Senju Francišku Čubraniću. Includes or is a Latinic transcription.	
		1549 (February 3)	XI. 70	Trsat (Franjevački samostan)	Trsat or Grobnik	1			Svjedočenje Grobničana da su mlinovi ispod Trsata oduvijek bili vlasništvo samostana Marije Trsatske.	
legal		1549 (May 14)	N. R. A. Fasc. 202. N. 21	HDA					Survives only in Latin translation.	
deed		1549 (June 2)		Arhiv HAZU	Orlica (Karlovac)				Pred orličkim sucem Mikulom Penićem plemići Kirin i Jure Slipčić prodaju dio svojih plemićkih posjeda Jemrihu Čačku za 10 dukata.	
legal		1549			Strilči				Mihalj Domšić prodaje jednu oranicu Jandriji Domjaniću. Acquired by Kukuljević.	
ledger		1530s/1540s	sign. 13d	Arhiv HAZU	Rijeka	2/1	28.5 x 20 cm		Blagajnički registar riječke općine pisan glagoljicom. Acquired by Kukuljević at Capuchin Monastery in Rijeka. Used in the cover of a book in the 17th century. Separated by Štefanić. Paper.	
drama		1500s (second quarter)	Fragm. glag. 13a-h	Arhiv HAZU		2	31.5 x 20.7 cm		Riječki odlomak Uloge Marije iz "Muke spasitelja našega". Acquired by Kukuljević at Capuchin Monastery in Rijeka where it was incorporated into the cover of a book in the 17th century. Separated by Štefanić. Paper.	
abecedary		1500s (first half)	Msc.Med.24 (N. I. 13)	Staatsbibliothek Bamberg		77	21.5 x 14.2 cm	1 co	Medical Abecedary (das Medizinische Abecedarium). Italian and Latin book with Glagolitic abecedary on 73v. Paper.	2022
		1550, 1590–1784, 1831	II a 79 (Kuk. Cod. glag. No VIII)	Arhiv HAZU	Belgrad (Vinodol)	19+12+12	28.3 x 10.5 cm		Zemljišna knjiga crkve (braće) sv. Marije u Belgradu. Glagolitic to mixed Glagolitic and Latinic then only Latinic from 1673 on. In 1790 the parish of Belgrad was united with the parish of Grižane. Acquired by Kukuljević in Grižane. One photograph in Štefanić 1970.	
legal		1550 (August 4)		archive of Samuil Keglević in Lobor	Topusko				Mihalj i Marko Vinkovići, tuženi da su njekakove novce izkopali, izjavljuju pred stolom topuskim, da se neće priti nego da se daju u ruke svojoj gospodi.	
		1550 (September 8)	IV. 65	Trsat (Franjevački samostan)	Dubašnica	2			Instrument kojim je jedan dolac zamijenjen za nešto drugo na Dubašnici.	
legal		1550	Crikvenički samostan collection br. 26	HDA	Draganić				Šimun Židećak kupuje jednu oranicu pred Filipom Kontovićem, županom draganićkim.	
grant		1550	IV. 68	Trsat (Franjevački samostan)	Trsat	2			Isprava kojom trsatski fratri daju braći Ivanu i Antonu Muževiću iz Grižana zemljište "nad Tribah" koje se zove "Radavič".	
judgement		1551	Glagolitica II-11	HDA	?				Parnica i izmirenje Tomaša, Luke i Šimuna s Mikulom Šinkovićem.	IzSt (2008)
deed		1552			Kupčina				Land purchases of Paval Grbinić. Acquired by Kukuljević.	
grant		1552	V. 222	Trsat (Franjevački samostan)	Trsat	2			Isprava kojom Antun Jugović poklanja samostanu Sv. Marije kuću.	
		1553–1559	Ms 2040	Ljubljana (Narodna in univerzitetna knjižnica)	Lovran	4			Dvolist iz lovranske kapiteljske knjige. Parchment.	DKS (14 February 2022)
		1553-1449	SF-52	Ljubljana (Narodna in univerzitetna knjižnica)	Lovran	189			Knjiga Lovranskega kapitlja in dvolist iz lovranske kapiteljske knjige. Glagolitic and Latinic.	DKS (20 April 2018)
protocol		1554 (February) – 1557 (January)	VIII 274	Arhiv HAZU	Vrbnik	46	31.7 x 21 cm		Notary protocol of Barić Bozanić (Notarski protokol Barića Bozanića). Scribe: Barić Bozanić son of Martin Bozanić. Paper. One photograph in Štefanić 1970.	
legal		1554 (March 15)			Bakar				Pero Denti kupuje vinograd od Frana Božarnića, s tim uvjetom, da plaća crkvi sv. Martina na Martinšćici četvrtinu vina. Survives in transcription, acquired by Kukuljević. V. Sladovića Poviesti str. 249.	
will		1554 (October 10)		Zadar (Arhiv samostana Franjevaca trećoredaca)	Dubašnica				Kopija oporuke Katarine, kći Andrije Pušića.	
will		1555			Samobor				Will of Petar Držanić. Acquired by Kukuljević.	
legal		1556 (June 2)			Perna				Dielni list Gašpara i Gabriela knezovah Peranjskih, učinjen na to izabranimi sudci. Latinic with Glagolitic signature.	
song		1556	IV a 47	Arhiv HAZU		96	21 x 15.3 cm		Crkvene drame: O muci Isusovoj, o snimanju s križa i o ukopu. Includes notes of importance to historians. Three photographs in Štefanić 1970. Microfilm brought to Star. inst. by M. Modrušan in 1989 (M 218a (I/35)).	IzSt (2008)
		1556	Berčićevo sobranje br. 3	Petersburg (гос. публ. библиотека)	Glavotok	34	12.5 x 9.9 cm		Epistola o nedjelji fra Petra Milutinića. Discovered by Berčić 1864 on Krk (probably in Glavotok monastery). Parchment.	
homiliary		1558	VIII 126	Arhiv HAZU		240	28 x 19.8 cm	2 co 32 ro	Knjige "Disipula". Written by a single hand over the course of at least 2 years (1556–1558): scribe Mihovil parish priest of Belgrad (in Vinodol). Owned by Andrija Benković of Grižane in 1668, and by Andrija Ilijić of Omišalj in 1767. A later Glagolitic note was also written on Krk. Discovered by Milčetić in Omišalj at the house of the parish priest Nikola Albanež. Reached JAZU through Milčetić archive. Paper. One photograph in Štefanić 1970. Bibliography:	IzSt (2008)
deed		1558 (October 20)	Glagolitica II-11a	HDA	Bakar				Pero Denti, bakarski kapetan, kupuje od Vida Derpčića komad vinograda u Martinšćici.	IzSt (2008)
rule		1559 (November 25)	IV a 122 (IV a 142)	Arhiv HAZU		20	15 x 10 cm		Mare magnum Franjevačkih indulgencija i privilegija. Scribe: Petar Milutinić of Rab, in a hand that imitates the original by fra Šimun Klimantović. Acquired by Ivan Berčić in Sutomišćica on Ugljan. Acquired by Arhiv JAZU in 1895 so Berčić probably loaned it to Kukuljević.	IzSt
deed		1559	IV. 70	Trsat (Franjevački samostan)		2			Isprava o kupnji sjenokoše od Uršule pokojnog Nikole.	
christenings, confirmations		1560–1566	IX 10	Arhiv HAZU	Dobrinj	160	31 x 21.5 cm		One photograph in Štefanić 1970.	FS
legal		1561 (March 20)		pismohrana senjskoga kaptola	Senj				Oporuka kneza Grgura Paliževića, vojvode senjskih vojnikah.	
		1561	II br. 236	Šibenik (Gradski muzej)	Murter				Confirmation of presentation of decree. Scribe: unknown.	
letter		1562 (December 16)		Rijeka (Sudska arhiva riječke komune)	Rijeka	1			Letter of Rijeka vicar Liberant Jampikula to Kastav. Written in the context of the court case between Rijeka tailor Šimun Ruglević and the Kastav citizen Martin Bratković. Glagolitic with German on same page.	
demarcation		1563 (July 29)			Ozalj				Levkuši i knez Mihalj Dešić naredjuju se s dobra za medje s knezom Mihaljem Muratovićem. Acquired by Kukuljević.	
deed		1563	Glagolitica II-12	HDA	Mahićno (Hrnetić)				Mike Šukal i brat mu Matak prodaju komad zemljišta svome stričiću Grguru Šukalu.	IzSt (2008)
		1500s-1700s		Dobrinj (župni ured)	Dobrinj	188	30.5 x 21 cm		Stara kapitulska knjiga. Paper dated by watermark to 1561 and 1563. Glagolitic with some Italian. Included copy of legal acts from 1100 and 1230, and other acts.	
		1500s-1600s		Zagreb (Samostan sv. Ksavera)	Glavotok	37			Gospodarska bilježnica (tako zvani bravarski zakon). Once found in the Arhiv provincijalata trećoredaca u Zadru, brought after WWI to Zagreb (Sv. Ksaver).	
		1564–1609	II b 293 or II b 34 (Kuk. 293)	Arhiv HAZU	Vrbnik	48	22.5 x 16 cm		Katastik bratovštine sv. Ivana u Vrbniku. Purchased by Kukuljević in 1854 from parish priest Petar Volarić. One photograph in Štefanić 1970.	
deed		1564		narodni muzej u Zagrebu	Kupčina				Mikula Petrčić kupuje kus zemlje od Ilije i Lovre Brzića	
deed		1564	OR 21	Knjižnica Staroslavenskog instituta	Novi Vinodolski				Kupoprodajni ugovor Ivana Ivića i Gabrijela Piskulića iz Novog. From the archive of the Mažuranić family.	
register		1565–1622		Silba (župni arhiv)	Silba	502 p	30.1 x 10 cm	1 co	Contains christenings 1620–1622, marriages 1565–1609, christenings 1565–1609, confirmations 1605, deaths 1609–1613.	FS
christenings		1565–1613	br. 688	Državni arhiv Zadar	Olib		31.3 x 10.3 cm	1 co	Together with other christenings registers.	DaZd
legal		1565 (November 13)		library of M. Mesić	Novigrad na Dobri				Knez Štefan Frankapan daje popu Matiju Miloniću prebendu svetoga Vida pod Bribirom.	
deed		1565 (December 16)		Paval Prišek in Letovanići	Gore				Franjo knez Slunjski Frankapan daruje Blažu Prisiku u Letovanićih njekoliko zemaljah i kmetah. Latinic transcription from 16 July 1691 in Moravče castle and from Kristofor Erdödi 9 November 1692 in Jastrebarsko also exists.	
christenings		1566, 1567, 1569, 1578	VIII 139 c	Arhiv HAZU	Vodnjan	4	31.2 x 22 cm		Mixed Glagolitic and Italian. 13 Glagolitic entries. Includes transcription in Latinic by Ivan Pavić of Poreč in 1929.	
marriages		1566–1613	br. 705	Državni arhiv Zadar	Olib	106 p	30 x 11.6 cm	1 co	Begins 13 January 1566.	DaZd, FS
chronicle		1566/1567	SB Auersperg I-A-21-4-1 Die Geschichte zu Sziget von 1566.	ÖNB		40 p			Sigetska kronika Franja Črnka. A Glagolitic transliteration of a Latinic original. Microfilms in Zagreb by 1952 (at HAZU and NSK). Current owner is Heinrich Auersberg. Bibliography:	
ledger		1566–1628			Roč				Knjiga računa općine Roč.	
prayer book		1568		Vrbnik (Ivan Volarić library)	Grobnik	44	10 x 10 cm		Molitvenik Gašpara Vnučića.	
receipts and expenditures		1570–1576	br. 20	Vrbnik (župni ured)	Vrbnik	20	31 x 21.3 cm		Knjiga primitaka i izdataka bratovštine sv. Ivana Krstitelja.	
		1570–1652	br. 6 a	Vrbnik (župni ured)	Vrbnik	38	30.5 x 21 cm		Miscellanea.	
register		1570–1630	Glagolitica I-4	HDA	Mali Lošinj	97	33.7 x 21.5 cm		Knjiga zapisnika, primitaka i izdataka bratovštine crkve sv. Martina. Glagolitic except 1586–1587 in Latinic and one Italian note on f. 75. HDA acquired it from Branka Antončić in 1946.	IzSt (2008)
deed		1570 (October 3)	Glagolitica II-13	HDA	Gerovo				Ambrož Merle javlja da je kupio u Gerovu tri polutke zemlje.	IzSt (2008)
receipts and expenditures		1572–1641	VIII 194	Arhiv HAZU	Beli (Cres)	124	30.7 x 21.5 cm		Knjiga primitaka i izdataka bratovštine (crkve) sv. Antuna u Belom. Completely Glagolitic. Discovered by Branko Fučić 1949 and given by him to JAZU. One photograph in Štefanić 1970.	
will		1572 (March 27)	Glagolitica II-14	HDA	Kastav				Will of Filip Furić (Oporuka Filipa Furića).	IzSt (2008)
christenings, marriages		1573–1574	Fragm. glag. 110	Arhiv HAZU	Lovran?	1	21 x 15 cm			
legal		1574 (February 24)	Glagolitica II-15	HDA	Drivenik				Pregovori za bir (daću) za zemljište "Čistine" između Driveničana i baštinika Gržanovih.	IzSt (2008)
permit		1574	II br.	Šibenik (Gradski muzej)	Prvić				Ja Tomas, Jurija Vlahnića sin, i moj brat Barto dajemo oblast i slobod našoj materi Jelini, da more prodati i darovati sve, ča koder jes bilo našega oca i ča je nam bija ostavija naš otac. Scribe: unknown.	
		1575–1605			Olib	29 p	30 x 11 cm		Razne bilješke u Olibu. Lost as of 2015.	
christenings, confirmations, marriages		1575–1748			Beli				Marriages 1662–1731, christenings 1575–1634, christenings 1648–1748, confirmations 1645–1743. Discovered by priest Bandera in the attick of the parish office of Beli.	
christenings, confirmations, marriages		1576–1658	III c 4	Arhiv HAZU	Boljun	141	30.8 x 10.5 cm		Christenings (1598–1634), confirmations (1588–1658), marriages (1576–1640). Glagolitic with Italian 1613–1618, 1638 and 1658.	
		1576–1672	VIII 140	Arhiv HAZU	Boljunec (Dolina)	96	31 x 21 cm		Knjiga crkve (bratovštine) sv. Ivana u Boljuncu. Glagolitic to 1610 then Italian from 1611. Acquired by JAZU 1930. One photograph in Štefanić 1970.	
song		1576	IV a 80/58	Arhiv HAZU		1	13 x 9 cm		Iz pjesme "Bratja, brata sprovodimo".	
legal		1577 (December 7)		pismohrana senjskoga kaptola	Senj				Senjski kaptol daje knezu Jurju Živkoviću jednu zemlju uz nasljedni podatak.	
will		1577	IV. 77	Trsat (Franjevački samostan)		2			Testament Mihalja Desića.	
judgement		1578	Glagolitica II-16	HDA	Grižane				Presuda u sporu oko zemlje između Martina Šimkovića i Frana Mavrinića.	IzSt (2008)
christenings, confirmations, marriages		1579–1722	VIII 139 a	Arhiv HAZU	Draguć	96	33.5 x 22.8 cm		Christenings 1579–1685, marriages 1584–1722 and confirmations 1659. Glagolitic to 1650 (by parish priest Andreja Matković) then Italian. Some Italian already in 1640 from Matteo Juretich. One photograph in Štefanić 1970.	
christenings, confirmations, marriages, deaths		1579–1650		Molat (župni ured)	Molat, Zapuntel	261 p	20.1 x 10.5 cm	1 co	Oldest parish register in Zadar bishopric. Contains christenings in Zapuntel 1630–1650 then in Molat 1613–1650, then confirmations 1618–1643, then marriages in Zapuntel 1614–1650, then marriages 1613–1650, then marriages 1584 and 1579, then deaths 1612–1650, then marriages 1579–1580, then christenings 1579–1588.	
christenings, marriages		1579–1650			Draguć					
deed		1579			Nuvsići				Sale of land by Benko Crnković to Antun Iškičić. Discovered in Ortaháza. Latinic transcription published by Janko Šafarik in Danica 1840 br. 26.	
homiliary		1500s (middle)		Krk (arhiv bivšeg Staroslavenskog instituta)		165	29 x 20 cm		Sermoni dissipula (po Herlotu) by Johann Herlot (Sermones Discipuli de tempore et de sanctis). Discovered by Ivan Črnčić in Dobrinj, who sold it 1853 to Stjepan Kocijančić professor at Gorica. Acquired from Kocijančić by Ivan Kukuljević who rebound it. Črnčić borrowed it from Kukuljević and never returned it. Upon his death it was taken by Dragutin Parčić 1928 to the Bogoslovska akademija in Zagreb. Then Orlić sent it to Vinko Premuda who transcribed part of it into Latinic in a manuscript housed on Košljun.	IzSt (2008)
christenings		1580–1599	br. 1621	Državni arhiv Zadar	Ugljan	49 p			Completely Glagolitic.	DaZd, FS
judgement		1580	XI. (no sign.)	Trsat (Franjevački samostan)	Kotor	1			Presuda učinjena u Kotoru po nalogu gvardijana na 100 libara zbog ubojstva žene i ubojstva na cesti.	
deed		1581 (January 19)	Glagolitica II-19	HDA	?				Isprava o prodaji zemlje.	IzSt (2008)
legal		1581 (November 30)			Krašići				Latinic with Glagolitic signature of Mihal Herendić. Acquired by Kukuljević.	
		1581	XXXI. 1	Trsat (Franjevački samostan)		2			Potvrda na ime Sabine iz Kastva, žene bivšeg suca Andrije Pehama, na 18 dukata, danih fratrima Djevice Marije.	
		1582–1672	R 3330	NSK	Boljun	115	23 x 16 cm		Kvadirna bratovštine oltara sv. Mikule u Boljunu. Glagolitic and Latinic. Bibliography:	NSK, GHR
		1800s		Arhiv Zadarske nadbiskupije	Sali	261 p	29.3 x 20.5 cm		Librar braće Svete Marije. Mentions "Pietro di Goess" (the podnamjesnik in Dalmatia during the second Austrian rule). Completely Glagolitic except for some Italian notes. The book is not in chronological order, and although the cover is not older than the 19th century, it is not certain if some of the pages are original or transcriptions because even the numeration follows the origina, with the earliest entry from 1582.	
parish registers		1582–1680	Inv. br. 600	DaZd	Pašman (town)	648 p	28.5 x 11 cm		Christenings 1590–1613, 1649–1659, marriages 1667–1680, christenings 1659–1679, confirmations 1607–1612, deaths 1607–1611, confirmations 1618–1645, 1655–1677, 1663, marriages 1582–1613, 1613–1643, 1653–1667, deaths 1653–1679, 1613–1653, 1606–1613, confession and eucharist 1655–1671, deaths 1607–1612.	FS, FS
marriages		1582–1613	br. 2287	DaZd	Pašman				Part of br. 600.	DaZd
deed		1582 (January 29)	Glagolitica II-17	HDA	Grižane				Mikula Barbarić kupuje na dražbi zemljište pokojnoga Frana Mavrinića.	IzSt (2008)
		1582 (April 8), 1596 (January)	IV a 80/51	Arhiv HAZU	Sali	1	10 x 14.5 cm		Dvije bilješke.	
will		1582 (December 16)	Glagolitica II-18	HDA	Kotor (Grižane)				Will of Marica widow Postolarić (Oporuka Marice udove Postolarić).	IzSt (2008)
notes		1582, 1596		Arhiv HAZU	Sali	1	14.5 x 10 cm		Dvije bilješke. Part of a page torn from some book. The note from 1582 was written by don Matij Batalić in the house of don Matul parish priest of Sali.	
judgement		1583		Arhiv HAZU	Belgrad (Vinodol)				Upravitelji knezova Frankapana zajedno sa sucima, plovanima i satnicima donose presudu u korist Grižanaca i Belgradaca vezano uz njihov spor s Driveničanima. Original dated 1449 in Grižane lost but copy, first mentioned in a Grižane list dated 1620, was contemporary with original. This document is a younger copy by priest Luka Mavrić.	
legal		1583 (January 14)			Mlaka na Mrežnici				Zadužni list kneza Daje Vukovića na novce, što ih je posudio od kneza Mihalja Herendića. Latinic with Glagolitic note.	
		1583–1623, 1662–1668	II c 77/c	Arhiv HAZU	Boljun	20	22.8 x 17 cm		Fragment of the Book of the Brotherhood of Saint Nicholas (Odlomak knjige bratovštine sv. Mikule). Includes Glagolitic portions as late as 6 December 1623. Earliest Italian from 1615.	
urbarium		1583–1695		Dolina, Biblioteca Civica of Trieste					Urbarium of the Brotherhood of Saint Servus (Urbar bratovštine sv. Socerba).	
		1584–1677	HR–DAZD–359 (Obitelj Lantana collection) kut. 36 sign. 649	DaZd		95			Sudski spor između obitelji de Marchis i Jurja Maletića sa stanovnicima Turnja. Latinic with some Glagolitic folia (ff. 87–94). Part of Lantana family archive. Acquired by Državni arhiv u Zadru 1945.	
will		1584	IV. 81	Trsat (Franjevački samostan)		4			Testament Jurja Muntića iz Lovrana u vezi s vinogradom zvanim Komušćak.	
marriage, confirmation, christenings		1585–1700, 1659–1696, 1585–1705	IX 16	Arhiv HAZU	Dubašnica, Krk	255	30 x 20.5 cm			FS
		1585 (January 15)	Glagolitika	Državni arhiv u Rijeci	Rijeka	1			Grobnički satnik Matija Kiršić saopćuje riječkom sudu rezultate ispitivanja svjedoka koje je proveo. Scribe: Matija Kiršić. In the context of the court case around the division of possessions of Ivan and Jelena Grohovac. Discovered in the Sudska arhiva riječke komune, transferred to the Državni arhiv u Rijeci.	
protocol		1586–1616			Veli Lošinj	103	34 x 11.5 cm	1 co	Krstinić Protocol (Krstinićev protokol). Scribes: Mikula Krstinić and his nephew Žuvan Krstinić. The earliest date to 1564 but they are copied. Acquired 1746 by notary Vintura Botterini. First noted 1791 in the chronicle of Lošinj notary Martin (Bonaventura) Botterini. At the time it was in the archive of the Botterini family. Botterini's note was relayed by Lošinj historians Bonicelli and Nicolich. In 1865 it was owned by Silvestar Busanić of Lošinj. In 1900 it was owned by H. Bussanich of Trieste. Milčetić was prevented from seeing it by the war. Found in possession of Silvija Bussanich in 1951, and a microfilm was then made for Arhiv JAZU with sign. I/34. Photographs of pages published in Košuta 1988. Used by Josip Hamm in his studies of the Susak dialect conducted from 1953 on. And in the dialectal studies of Eduard Hercigonja. It has also been used in scholarly works on the geography and history of Lošinj. Bibliography:	
will		1586	IV. 82	Trsat (Franjevački samostan)	Trsat	2			Testament Martina Maruvića iz Brseča.	
will		1586	XI. (no sign.)	Trsat (Franjevački samostan)	Trsat?	2			Testament Jurja Kričića kojim ostavlja neka zemljišta trsatskom Samostanu. A Glagolitic copy or transcription of the original.	
urbarium		1587–1651	VII 87	Arhiv HAZU	Prebenik-Mačkovlji	67	20.5 x 15 cm		Urbar crkve sv. Antuna. Glagolitic to 1609 then Italian. One photograph in Štefanić 1970.	
christenings		1587–1613	inv. br. 24	Državni arhiv u Zadru (DaZd)	Banj	36 p	21.2 x 15 cm			DaZd, FS
confessional		1487	br. 473	Dubrovnik (Biblioteka Male braće)		180 p			Upute redovnicima za ispovijedanje. Titles in Glagolitic, text in Cyrillic.	
		1588–1789	br. 21	Vrbnik (župni ured)	Vrbnik	125	17 x 12 cm		Knjiga bratovštine sv. Mavra.	
legal		1588 (August 15)			Kastav				Juraj Tencić prodaje polovicu svoje konobe Jurju Jurčiću. Acquired by Kukuljević.	
christenings		1590–1613		Arhiv Zadarske nadbiskupije	Lukoran	24 p	22.4 x 16.8 cm	1 co	16 pages are cursive Glagolitic. Scribe: parish priest Dunat Matučić. Found 1884 in Banj by D. B. Cvitanović and returned to Lukoran. Bibliography:	GUZ, PB
christenings		1590–1679	br. 800	DaZd	Pašman	150 p			Part of br. 600.	DaZd
legal		1590 (December 31)			Bribir				Purchase of land by Antun Parčić from his father. Acquired by Kukuljević.	
christenings		1591–1667	VIII 139 b	Arhiv HAZU	Lindar	94	27.3 x 21.2 cm		Mostly Glagolitic to 1648 then only Latinic from 1649. One photograph in Štefanić 1970.	
deed		1591 (April 22)	Glagolitica II-20	HDA	Grižane				Ivan Glušić prodaje komad vinograda Stipanu Kovačiću.	IzSt (2008)
rental agreement		1591 (June 20)	I br. 1	Šibenik (Gradski muzej)	Murter				Najamni ugovor između Mihovila Blaškovića i Jadrija Metilića. Scribe: don Petar Meštrović.	
births, christenings, souls, marriages, deaths, annerversaries		1592–1754		Mali Lošinj (župni arhiv)	Mali Lošinj	362 p			Births 1596–1680, christenings 1592–1754, marriages 1622–1664, deaths 1630–1765. Glagolitic then mixed then Latin, last Glagolitic entry 1732.	FS
ledger		1592–1675		Galevac (Samostan sv. Pavla)	Galevac	213 p	31.9 x 22.2 cm		Blagajnički dnevnik 1591–1675. Includes inventory on 3 pages.	
marriages		1593–1594		HDA	Rijeka	2			The oldest marriage register of Rijeka begins 2 January 1590 but is missing a bifolium which was taken from it at a certain point, but it began with one Latin entry on 8 June 1593 followed by 8 Glagolitic entries from 19 July 1593 to 21 February 1594. The bifolium was taken to Zagreb, housed in the HDA (though Štefanić could not find it in preparation for his 1953 publication). The Glagolitic scribes included the parish priest of Rijeka pop Fran Marganić, pop Juraj Dorić and pop Bartol Ciganić. This manuscript was written during the time Claude Sozomene bishop of Pula was banning Glagolitic and Church Slavonic from ecclesiastical use, so Štefanić proposed it may have been taken out of the register already in that time, though it could have been taken out later during Italian rule (maliciously or for safe keeping). The manuscript was lost as of the time of Štefanić.	
		1595–1663	III c 3	Arhiv HAZU	Boljun	81	30 x 10.3 cm		Knjiga bratovštine sv. Roka (sv. Katarine i sv. Blaža). Glagolitic to 1612 then Italian 1614–1616 then Glagolitic 1617–1657 then Italian 1658–1663. One photograph in Štefanić 1970.	
protocol		1595–1620	II d 119/I (Kuk. 316)	Arhiv HAZU		49	30 x 20.2 cm		Fragment notarskog protokola Gržana Valkovića. The protocol of Gržan Valković dates from 1611 to 25 December 1620. Acquired by Kukuljević. One photograph in Štefanić 1970.	
ledger		1595–1660	II c 77/b	Arhiv HAZU	Boljun	74	21 x 30 cm		Računi (Kvaderna) "Od dot crekvenih". Glagolitic to 1657 then Italian from 1659. Scribes: mostly priest Vicenc Frlanić to 1612 then mostly parish priest Bernardin Velijan 1620–1657.	
		1595			Olib	11 p	30 x 11 cm		Popis pričešćenih u Olibu. Lost as of 2015.	
christenings		1596–1680			Mali Lošinj					
christenings, marriages, deaths		1596 – 1700s (first half)	IX 3	Arhiv HAZU	Novalja	148	20 x 15 cm		Glagolitic but from the middle 17th century on mixed with Latinic by some scribes. One photograph in Štefanić 1970.	FS
deed		1596 (May 10)		M. Mesić in Zagreb	Grižane				Purchase of Matij Črnić.	
judgement		1597 (May 22, June 2)	Glagolitica II-21	HDA	Crikvenica	2			Judgement of Stipan Katričić whose son Matij stood accused of hitting a bell in the monastery church (Presuda Stipanu Katričiću koji je bio optužen da je njegov sin Matij polupao jedno zvono u samostanskoj crkvi).	IzSt (2008)
deed		1598 (May 3)	Glagolitica II-22	HDA	Grižane				Jelena Barinević i sin joj Juraj prodaju jednu zemlju u Zagorju Jeleninu pastorku Bariću.	IzSt (2008)
legal		1599 (January 3)	Glagolitica II-23	HDA	Hum				Brte Gržinić, tkalac, i Grže Bilinić Ličanin zamjenjuju neka zemljišta.	IzSt (2008)
miscellany	CGrš	1500s (second half)	VII 32	Arhiv HAZU	Istria	192	20.5 x 15 cm		Grškovićev zbornik (Gršković miscellany). Written by a single hand. Once belonged to a priest. Purchased for Arhiv JAZU in 1934 from Ivan Gršković parish priest of Vrbnik. Includes Glagolitic note by Vinko Premuda. Bibliography:	IzSt (2008)
breviary		1500s	Berčićevo sobranje fragmenata I, 31 (old 31, 51)	Petersburg (гос. публ. библиотека)		1	27 x 19 cm			IzSt (2008; on 500–501)
breviary	Fg(Br)Vrg	1500s		Vrgada (župni ured)		2	23.5 x 18 cm	2 co	Vrgada Breviary Fragment. Includes Matthew 5:15-15. Formerly attached to the cover of the Vrgada christenings register.	
breviary	Fg(Br)Vrg	1500s		Vrgada (župni ured)		2	20.2 x 16.6 cm	2 co	Fragment Traktata o sedam smrtnih grijeha (Vrgada fragment of Tractate on the Seven Deadly Sins). Text is closer to that of CIv than CKol. Formerly attached to the cover of the Vrgada christenings register.	
16 prophets		1500s	Sinodalna collection 78	GIM-Moskva	Russia	352			16 Prophets with commentary. Cyrillic with Glagolitic initials on folia 82v, 86r, 203v, 204r, and 1 word on 67r.	
16 prophets		1500s	f. 1196 (Antonievo-Sijski manastir) 17	RGADA-Moskva	Russia				16 Prophets with commentary. Cyrillic with Glagolitic in titles and initials.	
miscellany	CŽg	1500s	VII 30	Arhiv HAZU	East Istria	125	19.2 x 13.4 cm	1 co	Žgombićev zbornik (Žgombić miscellany). Scribes: hand A f. 1-10v (later addition to codex), hand B f. 11-23v, hand C f. 24-123v. Hand A also made notes dated 1582 and 1583 on f. 124. The paper of hand B dates to the period 1547–1561, whereas the paper of hand C dates to 1519 and 1523. Hand C wrote around 1520–1530 and is the oldest in the codex. Hand A likely wrote in Mošćenice. It remained in Mošćenice in the 17th century but ended up in among the Franciscans on Krk. Codex is named after Benko Žgombić, guardian of the monastery sv. Madije Magdalene in Porta, who gave it to Milčetić. Milčetić left it in his will to Arhiv HAZU where it has been located since 1923. One photograph in Štefanić 1970. Digitisation in process, previews released by Staroslavenski Institut. Bibliography:	IzSt (2008)
statute	CnVb	1526 (1500s)	R 4003	NSK	Vrbnik	36	18 x 12 cm	1 co	Vrbnički statut (Vrbnik Statute, Krčki statut). Once part of Petris collection. Bought by NSK between 1960 and 1970 from the Petris Monastery of Krk. Bibliography:	NSK, GHR, IzSt (2008)
		1500s	No. 8	Krušedol Monastery	Serbia				Cyrillic with Glagolitic employed cryptographically autograph, but betraying partial unfamiliarity with script with confusion of d and l, in contrast to Serbian late practical use of Glagolitic in SANU No. 55. Facsimile of autograph at eGPIBR.	
demarcation		1500s	Acta medievalia varia 43	Državni arhiv Zagreb	Belgrad (Vinodol)	1	24 x 21.5 cm	1 co	Popis zemljišnih posjeda kotorske, grižanske i belgradske općine u Sopaljskom polju. First published by Šurmin, who mistook it for the 1323 original as discovered by Ivšić. There was also a Glagolitic transcription made 1635 by Ivan Mužinić, transcribed by Radoslav Lopašić, which Bratulić could not locate. Paper.	
law code	CnVin	1500s	R 4080	NSK	Vinodol	14	26 x 18 cm	1 co	Vinodolski zakonik. Law code of Vinodol. Original from 1288 but survives in a 16th-century transcription. Facsimile was made 1934 (R 5193). Bibliography:	NSK GHR
songs		1500s	IV a 80/33	Arhiv HAZU	Istria?	1	14 x 10.3 cm		Dvije mrtvačke jesme.	
deed		1500s	No 2, C.1.F.1	Ljubljana (knjižnica samostana franjevačke provincije Sv. Križa)	Slunj	1	22.5 x 20.7 cm	1 co	Fra Marko, gvardian slunjskog samostana, kupuje od Matijaša Grgina neku sjenokošu u selu Melnici kod Slunja.	
dialogue	DiPr	1500s/1600s	VII 70	Arhiv HAZU	Lošinj (or Cres)	65	21 x 15.5 cm		Dijalog Grgura pape (Premudin). Paper dated to 1570 and 1576. Acquired by JAZU with archive of Vinko Premuda of Baška in 1948. One photograph in Štefanić 1970.	
homiliary		1500s/1600s	Fragm. glag. 115	Arhiv HAZU	Vinodol?	1	28.2 x 15 cm		Odlomak zbornika postila (propovijedi). Dialect ikavo-ekavian.	
