= Vrbnik Statute =

1388 Croatian city statute

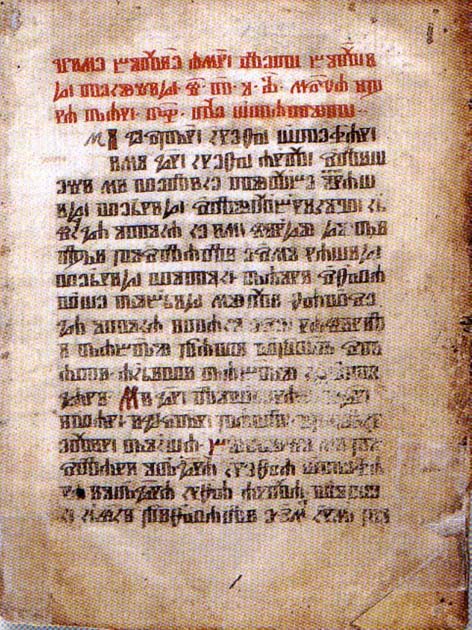

The Vrbnik Statute (Croatian: Statut Grada Vrbnika) is a 14th-century Glagolitic city statute of the Croatian city Vrbnik.

The Vrbnik Statute was written in 1388 on the east coast of the island of Krk in Croatia. The Vrbnik Statute is the second oldest among Croatian city statutes, written shortly after Vinodol Statute. It hasn't been preserved in Glagolitic Script like the Veprinac Statute, but only as a transcript which was made by Vrbnik priest Grgur Zaskovic. Today, it is stored in the University Library of Zagreb.

The Vrbnik Statute confirms the status of Vrbnik, as an administrative and political centre from the 14th century.

== See also ==
- Kastav Statute
- List of Glagolitic manuscripts (1500–1599)
- Lists of Glagolitic manuscripts
