= Law code of Vinodol =

Oldest law texts

- Created: 1288
- Purpose: code

Law code of Vinodol or Vinodol statute (Croatian: Vinodolski zakonik) is one of the oldest law texts written in the Chakavian dialect of Croatian and is among the oldest Slavic codes. (Note: Russkaya Pravda is the only older code in Slavdom.) It was written in the Glagolitic alphabet. It was originally compiled in 1288 by a commission of 42 members in Novi Vinodolski, a town on the Adriatic Sea coast in Croatia, located south of Crikvenica, Selce and Bribir and north of Senj. However, the code itself is preserved in a 16th-century copy.

== The statute ==
A paragraph was set to define the relation between the dukes and the peasantry of the region. It is the oldest among all Croatian city statutes, which represented an agreement between the people of Vinodol and their new liege lords Frangipani, the counts of Krk. It contains important information about the feudal law in this area which had replaced the tribal customs of an earlier period. The Vinodol Statute provides a rare contemporary picture of the life and political conditions in medieval Europe. The oldest regulations concerning public health in western Croatia are preserved within the Vinodol Statute. Today, it is stored in the National and University Library Zagreb.

The Vinodol Statute confirms status of the Vinodol as an administrative and political center from the 13th century. The text of the statute is preserved as a copy from the 16th century.

== Editions ==
The first printed edition was prepared in 1843 by Antun Mažuranić in the third yearly volume of the journal Kolo. Osip Bodyansky translated it in 1846 to Russian and Anna Mikhailovna Evreinova edited the 1878 edition in Saint Petersburg, with facsimile of the original as well as Latin and Cyrillic transliteration. Vatroslav Jagić published it in 1880, both the original and a Russian translation with philological and legal commentary. Wacław Maciejowski translated it in 1856 to Polish, Jules Preux translated it in 1896 to French, Mark Kostrenčić translated it in 1931 to German and Lujo Margetić translated it in 1981/1982 to Italian, and in 1983 to English. Josip Bratulić edited the 1988 facsimile edition with commentary and a dictionary.

== See also ==
- Kastav Statute
- Vrbnik Statute
- List of Glagolitic manuscripts (1500–1599)
- Lists of Glagolitic manuscripts
