= Kastav Statute =

The Kastav Statute (Croatian: Statut Grada Kastva) is a 14th-century Glagolitic city statute of Croatian city Kastav.

The Kastav Statute "Zakon Grada Kastva od letta 1400", was written in 1400, in Istria, near Rijeka in Croatia. Some sources claims that it was written in 1490, but it was probably translated from Glagolitic Script into Latin then, since it is preserved in Latin.

The Kastav Statute confirms status of Kastav, as an administrative and political centre from the late 14th century.

== See also ==
- Glagolitic alphabet
- Mošćenica Statute
- Veprinac Statute
- Vrbnik Statute
