= Glagolitic script =

Oldest known Slavic alphabet

Glagolitic
- Samples of text from the "Kiev Missal" (sometimes thought to be the oldest Old Church Slavonic manuscript) and "Reims Gospel"
- Script type: Alphabet
- Creator: Saint Cyril of Thessalonica
- Period: 862; 1164 years ago/863; 1163 years ago to the Middle Ages (survival in Croatia into the 19th century)
- Direction: Left-to-right
- Languages: Byzantine Greek, Old Church Slavonic and local recensions, Chakavian Croatian, Old Croatian, Old Czech, Old Serbian, Old Slovene, Old Slovak

Related scripts
- Parent systems: Egyptian hieroglyphs: Proto-Sinaitic; Phoenician; Greek; Glagolitic

ISO 15924
- ISO 15924: Glag (225), Glagolitic

Unicode
- Unicode alias: Glagolitic
- Unicode range: U+2C00–U+2C5F Glagolitic; U+1E000–U+1E02F Glag. Supplement

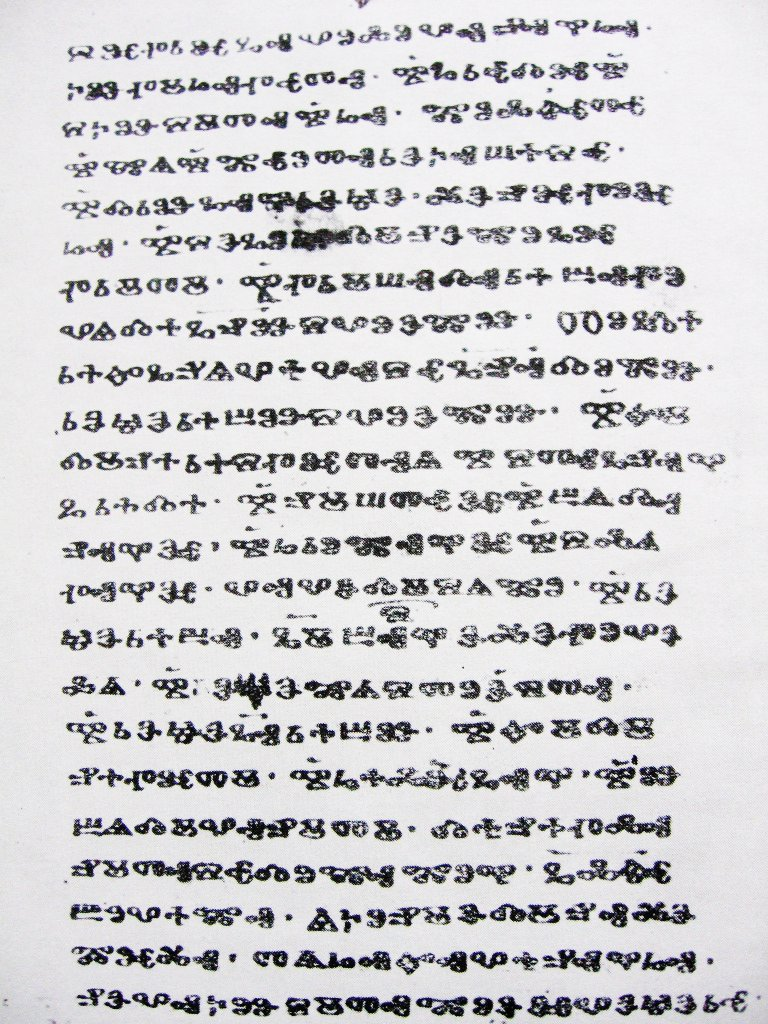
A page from the Zograf Codex with text of the Gospel of Luke

The Glagolitic script (/ˌɡlæɡəˈlɪtɪk/ GLAG-ə-LIT-ik; ⰳⰾⰰⰳⱁⰾⰻⱌⰰ, glagolitsa) is the oldest-known Slavic alphabet. It is generally agreed that it was created in the 9th century for the purpose of translating Greek liturgical texts into Old Church Slavonic by Cyril, a Christian monk from Thessalonica. He and his brother Methodius were sent by the Byzantine Emperor to Great Moravia as missionaries. After the deaths of Cyril and Methodius, their disciples were expelled from Moravia, and they moved to the First Bulgarian Empire instead. The Early Cyrillic alphabet, which was developed gradually in the Preslav Literary School by scribes who incorporated some Glagolitic letters when writing in the Greek alphabet, gradually replaced Glagolitic in that region. Glagolitic remained in use alongside the Cyrillic and Latin script in the Kingdom of Croatia and Dalmatia and alongside Cyrillic until the 14th century in the Second Bulgarian Empire and the Serbian Empire; in later periods, its use in its eastern range was mainly for cryptographic purposes.

== Name and etymology ==
The word glagolitic comes from Neo-Latin glagoliticus and Croatian glagoljica, ultimately deriving from the Old Church Slavonic word ⰳⰾⰰⰳⱁⰾⱏ (glagolŭ), meaning 'utterance' or 'word'. The name glagoljica / glagolitsa is thought to have developed in Croatia around the 14th century from the word glagolity, which referred to those who used the Slavonic liturgy. The Croatian language portal (based on the work of Vladimir Anić) notes the etymology of today's word glagoljica as glagòljati, that has a historical meaning of celebrating mass in Old Church Slavonic.

In the languages now spoken in the places where Glagolitic script was once used, the script is known as глаголица (romanized as glagolitsa or glagolica, depending on which language) in Bulgarian, Macedonian and Russian; glagoljica (глагољица) in Croatian and Serbian; глаголиця (hlaholytsia) in Ukrainian; глаголіца (hlaholitsa) in Belarusian; hlaholice in Czech; hlaholika in Slovak; głagolica in Polish; and glagolica in Slovene and Sorbian.

== History ==
Glagolitic had spread as far as the Kievan Rus' and the Kingdom of Bohemia. Although its use declined there in the 12th century, some manuscripts in the territory of the former retained Glagolitic inclusions for centuries. It had also spread to Duklja and Zachlumia in the Western Balkans, from where it reached the March of Verona. There, the Investiture Controversy afforded it refuge from the opposition of Latinizing prelates and allowed it to entrench itself in Istria, from which place it spread to nearby lands. It survived there and as far south as Dalmatia without interruption into the 20th century for Church Slavonic in addition to its use as a secular script in parts of its range, which at times extended into Bosnia, Slavonia, and Carniola, in addition to 14th–15th century exclaves in Prague and Kraków, and a 16th-century exclave in Putna.

Its authorship by Cyril was forgotten, having been replaced with an attribution to St. Jerome by the early Benedictine adopters of Istria in a bid to secure the approval of the papacy. The bid was ultimately successful, though sporadic restrictions and repressions from individual bishops continued even after its official recognition by Pope Innocent IV. These had little effect on the vitality of the script, which evolved from its original Rounded Glagolitic form into an Angular Glagolitic form, in addition to a cursive form developed for notary purposes.

The Ottoman conquests left the script without most of its continental population, and as a result of the Counter-Reformation its use was restricted in Istria and the Diocese of Zagreb, and the only active printing press with a Glagolitic type was confiscated, leading to a shift towards Latinic and Cyrillic literacy when coupled with the Tridentine requirement that priests be educated at seminaries. The result was its gradual death as a written script in most of its continental range, but also the unusually late survival of medieval scribal tradition for the reproduction of Glagolitic texts in isolated areas like the island of Krk and the Zadar Archipelago. Although the Propaganda Fide would eventually resume printing Glagolitic books, very few titles were published, so the majority of Glagolitic literary works continued to be written and copied by hand well into the 18th century.

In the early 19th century, the policies of the First French Empire and Austrian Empire left the script without legal status, and its last remaining centers of education were abolished, concurrent with the weakening of the script in the few remaining seminaries that used the cursive form in instruction, resulting in a rapid decline. But when the Slavicists discovered the script and established it as the original script devised by Cyril, Glagolitic gained new niche applications in certain intellectual circles, while a small number of priests fought to keep its liturgical use alive, encountering difficulties but eventually succeeding to the point that its area expanded in the early 20th century.

Latinic translations and transliterations of the matter of the missal in this period led to its decline in the decades before Vatican II, whose promulgation of the vernacular confined regular use of Glagolitic to a few monasteries and academic institutions, in addition to a small population of enthusiasts, whose numbers grew and shrank with the prevalence of the script in literature, but grew exponentially in pious and nationalist circles in the years leading up to and following the Independence of Croatia, and again more broadly with the Internet.

=== Origins ===
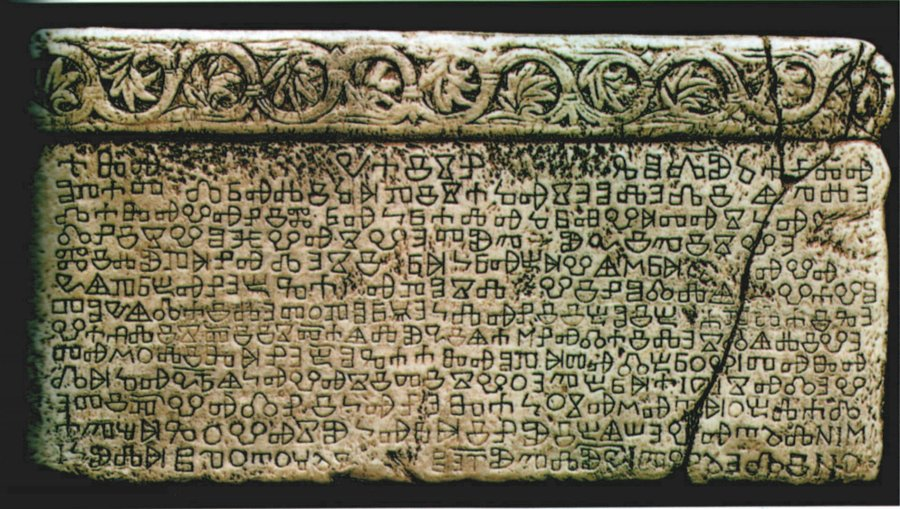
The Baška tablet, found in the 19th century on Krk, conventionally dated to about 1100

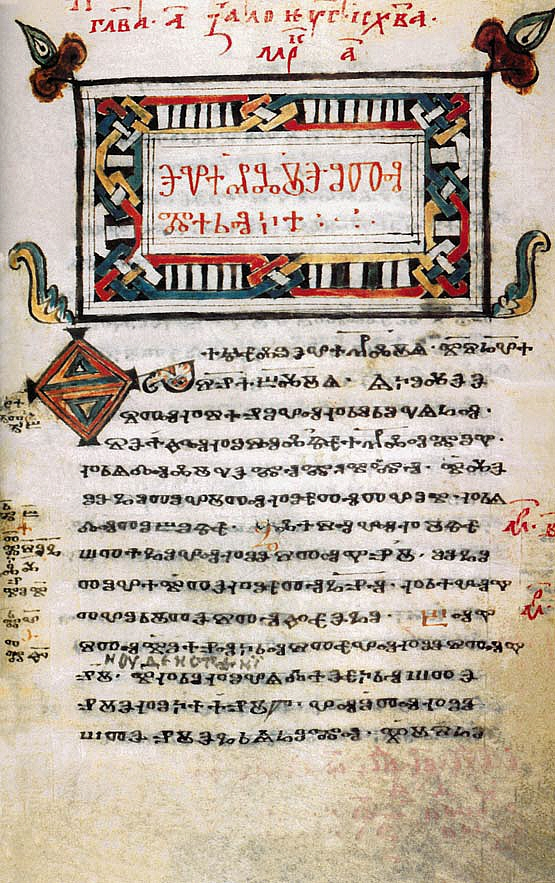
The first page of the Gospel of Mark from the 10th–11th century Codex Zographensis, found in the Zograf Monastery in 1843

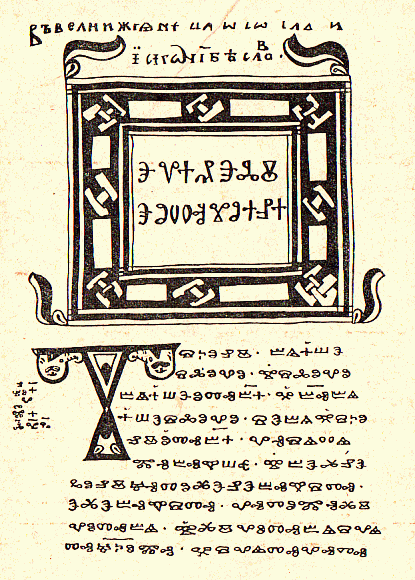
The first page of the Gospel of John from the Codex Zographensis

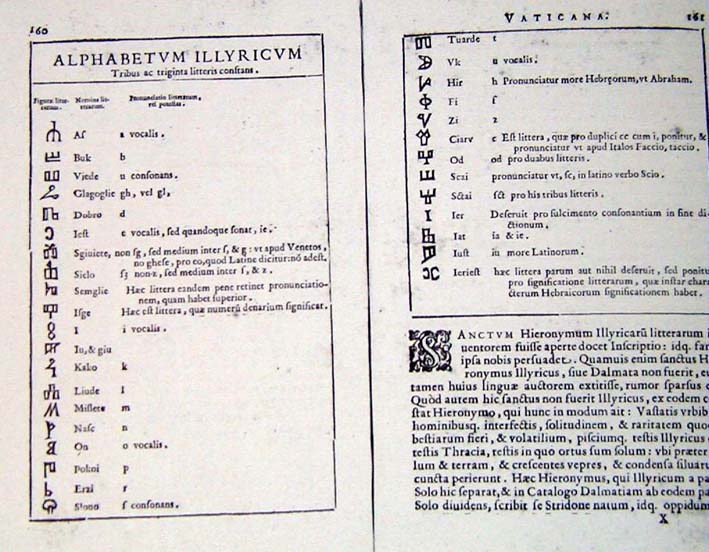
In a book printed in 1591, Angelo Rocca attributed the Glagolitic script to Saint Jerome.

The creation of the characters is popularly attributed to Saints Cyril and Methodius, who may have created them to facilitate the introduction of Christianity. It is believed that the original letters were fitted to Slavic dialects in geographical Macedonia specifically (the Byzantine theme of Thessalonica). The words of that language could not be easily written by using either the Greek or Latin alphabets.

The number of letters in the original Glagolitic alphabet is not known, but it might have been close to its presumed Greek model. The 41 letters known today include letters for non-Greek sounds, which might have been added by Saint Cyril, as well as ligatures added in the 12th century under the influence of Cyrillic, as Glagolitic lost its dominance. In later centuries, the number of letters dropped dramatically, to fewer than 30 in modern Croatian and Czech recensions of the Church Slavic language. Twenty-four of the 41 original Glagolitic letters (see table below) probably derive from graphemes of the medieval cursive Greek small alphabet but have been given an ornamental design.

The source of the other consonantal letters is unknown. If they were added by Cyril, it is likely that they were taken from an alphabet used for Christian scripture. It is frequently proposed that the letters sha Ⱎ, tsi Ⱌ, and cherv Ⱍ were taken from the letters shin ש and tsadi צ of the Hebrew alphabet, and that Ⰶ zhivete derives from Coptic janja Ϫ. However, Cubberley suggests that if a single prototype were presumed, the most likely source would be Armenian. Several other scripts have been proposed as such single prototypes of the Glagolitic alphabet. A different set of hypotheses assumes that Cyril designed the letters from scratch on the basis of a common principle. Most notably, Georg Tschernochvostoff argued that all the Glagolitic letters were constructed from the Christian symbols cross, circle and triangle. A widely accepted example of deliberate construction are the symmetric letters i ⰻ and slovo ⱄ, which together form the abbreviation ⰻ︦ⱄ of the nomen sacrum ⰻⱄⱆⱄⱏ Isusъ ‘Jesus’, but a general design principle like in the Canadian syllabics could not be proven. A plausible hypothesis is that “Cyril freely invented the Glagolitic letters, sometimes being inspired by theological ideas […] and sometimes using associations with other scripts he knew”.

For writing numbers, the Glagolitic numerals use letters with a numerical value assigned to each based on their native alphabetic order. This differs from Cyrillic numerals, which inherited their numeric value from the corresponding Greek letter (see Greek numerals).

The two brothers from Thessaloniki, who were later canonized as Saints Cyril and Methodius, were sent to Great Moravia in 862 by the Byzantine emperor at the request of Prince Rastislav, who wanted to weaken the dependence of his country on East Frankish priests. The Glagolitic alphabet, however it originated, was used between 863 and 885 for government and religious documents and books and at the Great Moravian Academy (Veľkomoravské učilište) founded by the missionaries, where their followers were educated. The Kiev Missal, found in the 19th century in Jerusalem, was dated to the 10th century.

In 885, Pope Stephen V issued a papal bull to restrict spreading and reading Christian services in languages other than Latin or Greek. Around the same time, Svatopluk I, following the interests of the Frankish Empire and its clergy, persecuted the students of Cyril and Methodius, imprisoned and expelled them from Great Moravia.

In 886, an East Frankish bishop of Nitra named Wiching banned the script and jailed 200 followers of Methodius, mostly students of the original academy. They were then dispersed or, according to some sources, sold as slaves by the Franks. However, many of them, including Saints Naum, Clement, Angelar, Sava and Gorazd, reached the First Bulgarian Empire and were commissioned by Boris I of Bulgaria to teach and instruct the future clergy of the state in the Slavic language. After the adoption of Christianity in Bulgaria in 865, religious ceremonies and Divine Liturgy were conducted in Greek by clergy sent from the Byzantine Empire, using the Byzantine rite. Fearing growing Byzantine influence and weakening of the state, Boris viewed the introduction of the Slavic alphabet and language into church use as a way to preserve the independence of the Bulgarian Empire from Byzantine Constantinople. As a result of Boris' measures, two academies, one in Ohrid and one in Preslav, were founded.

=== Spread of the script ===
From there, the students travelled to other places and spread the use of their alphabet. Students of the two apostles who were expelled from Great Moravia in 886, notably Clement of Ohrid and Saint Naum, brought the Glagolitic alphabet to the First Bulgarian Empire and were received and accepted officially by Boris I of Bulgaria. This led to the establishment of the two literary schools: the Preslav Literary School and the Ohrid Literary School. Some went to Croatia (Dalmatia), where the squared variant arose and where Glagolitic remained in use for a long time. In 1248, Pope Innocent IV granted the Croatians of southern Dalmatia the unique privilege of using their own language and this script in the Roman Rite liturgy. Formally granted to bishop Philip of Senj, permission to use the Glagolitic liturgy (the Roman Rite conducted in the Slavic language instead of Latin, not the Byzantine rite), actually extended to all Croatian lands, mostly along the Adriatic coast. The Holy See had several Glagolitic missals published in Rome. Authorization for the use of this language was extended to some other Slavic regions between 1886 and 1935. In missals, the Glagolitic script was eventually replaced with the Latin alphabet, but the use of the Slavic language in the Mass continued, until replaced by modern vernacular languages.

At the end of the 9th century, one of these students of Methodius – Saint Naum, one of the founders of the Pliska Literary School (commonly known as the Preslav Literary School, where the Bulgarian capital, along with the school, was transferred to in 893) – is often credited, at least by supporters of glagolitic precedence, for the "creation" or wider adoption of the Cyrillic script, which almost entirely replaced Glagolitic during the Middle Ages. The Cyrillic alphabet is derived from the Greek alphabet used at that time, with some additional letters for sounds peculiar to Slavic languages (like ⟨ш⟩, ⟨ц⟩, ⟨ч⟩, ⟨ъ⟩, ⟨ь⟩, ⟨ѣ⟩), likely derived from the Glagolitic alphabet. The decision by a great assembly of notables summoned by Boris in the year 893 in favor of Cyrillic created an alphabetical difference between the two literary centres of the Bulgarian state in Pliska and Ohrid. In the western part the Glagolitic alphabet remained dominant at first. However, subsequently in the next two centuries, mostly after the fall of the First Bulgarian Empire to the Byzantines, Glagolitic gradually ceased to be used there at all. Nevertheless, particular passages or words written with the Glagolitic alphabet appeared in Bulgarian Cyrillic manuscripts till the end of the 14th century. Some students of the Ohrid academy went to Bohemia where the alphabet was used in the 10th and 11th centuries, along with other scripts. It is not clear whether the Glagolitic alphabet was used in the Duchy of Kopnik before the Wendish Crusade, but it was certainly used in Kievan Rus'. Another use of Glagolitic is presumed in now southern Poland (Duchy of Vistula/White Croats state) and the Transcarpathia region.

=== Survival and use in Croatia ===
In Croatia, from the 12th century, Glagolitic inscriptions appeared mostly in littoral areas: Istria, Primorje, Kvarner, and Kvarner islands, notably Krk, Cres, and Lošinj; in Dalmatia, on the islands of Zadar, but there were also findings in inner Lika and Krbava, reaching to Kupa river, and even as far as Međimurje and Slovenia. Hrvoje's Missal from 1404 was illuminated in Split, and it is considered one of the most beautiful Croatian Glagolitic books. The 1483 Missale Romanum Glagolitice was the first printed Croatian Glagolitic book.

It was believed that Glagolitsa in Croatia was present only in those areas. But, in 1992, the discovery of Glagolitic inscriptions in churches along the Orljava river in Slavonia totally changed the picture (churches in Brodski Drenovac, Lovčić, and some others), showing that use of the Glagolitic alphabet was spread from Slavonia also.

Sporadic instances aside, Glagolitic survived beyond the 12th century as a primary script in Croatian lands alone, although from there a brief attempt at reintroduction was made in the West Slavic area in the 14th century through the Emmaus Benedictine Monastery in Prague, where it survived well into the 15th century, the last manuscript with Glagolitic script dating to 1450–1452. Its use for special applications continued in some Cyrillic areas, for example in the Bologna Psalter (1230–1241), the Sinodalna 895 Menaion (1260), the RPK 312 Gospel (13th), the Karakallou Epistolary (13th), the NBKM 933 Triodion (13th), the Skopje 1511 Octoechos (13th), the BRAN 4.9.39 Miscellany (13th), the Hilandar Chrysorrhoas (13th/14th), the Mazurin 1698 Pandects (13th/14th), the Sofia Psalter (1337), the SANU 55 Epistolary (1366–1367), the RNB F.п.I.2 Psalter (14th), the Čajniče Gospel (late 14th), the Radosav Miscellany (1444–1461), the Prague NM IX.F.38 Psalter (18th) and in the initials of many manuscripts of the Prophets with Commentary dating to the late 15th and early 16th centuries from Muscovy and Russia. Most later use in the Cyrillic world was for cryptographic purposes, such as in the Krushedol Miscellany (15th), the RNB F.п.I.48 Prologue (1456), the Piskarev 59 Isaac (1472), the Shchukin 511 Miscellany (1511) and the Hludov Gospel (17th/18th).

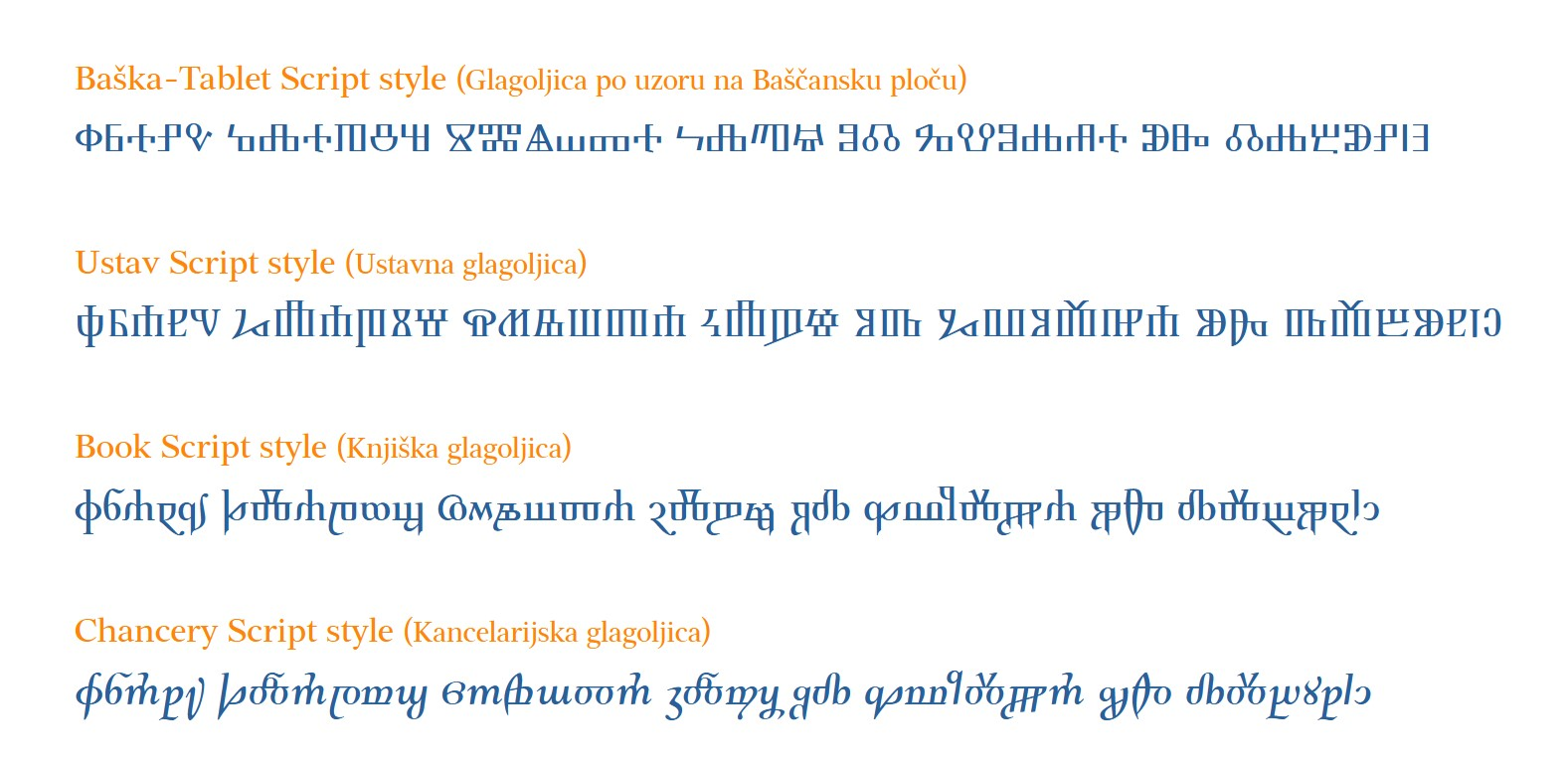
Development of the Glagolitic script over the centuries, from the Baška tablet, through the Missale Romanum Glagolitice, a combination of the Žgombić miscellany, the Petris miscellany, and the Senj Quaderna, and the Law code of Vinodol

The early development of the Glagolitic minuscule script alongside the increasingly square majuscule is poorly documented, but a mutual relationship evolved between the two varieties: the majuscule being used primarily for inscriptions and higher liturgical uses, and the minuscule being used in both religious and secular documents. Ignoring the problematic early Slavonian inscriptions, the use of the Glagolitic script at its peak before the Croatian-Ottoman wars corresponded roughly to the area that spoke the Chakavian dialect at the time, in addition to some adjacent Kajkavian regions within the Zagreb bishopric. As a result, vernacular impact on the liturgical language and script largely stems from Chakavian sub-dialects, although South Chakavian speakers mostly used Cyrillic, with Glagolitic only in certain parishes as a high liturgical script until a Glagolitic seminary was opened in Split in the 18th century, aside from a period of time in the parish of Kučiće-Vinišće.

Notable angular majuscule manuscripts written in this period include: parts of Glagolita Clozianus, the Ohrid epistolary, the Vienna folia, the Gršković Fragment, the Mihanović Fragment, the First Vrbnik Breviary, the Vrbnik Statute, the Reims Gospel, the Missal of duke Novak, Hrvoje's Missal, the Berlin missal and parts of the Kiev Missal.

Notable minuscule manuscripts include: Greblo's quaresimal, Tumačenje od muke, the Kastav Statute, the Istrian Demarcation, and the Law code of Vinodol.

Berlin missal (1402)

=== Decline in Croatia ===
Bishoprics by size of 16th century Glagolitic inscriptional corpus (in letters).
1. Poreč (22.4%)
2. Trieste (19.9%)
3. Pula (18.9%)
4. Krk (14.9%)
5. Pićan (6.00%)
6. Zadar (5.40%)
7. Novi (5.00%)
8. Other, including Senj, Koper, Novigrad, Otočac, Zagreb, Osor, Aquileia, Đakovo, Nin, Assisi, Cazin, Rab. See list. (7.50%)

The Ottoman Empire's repeated incursions into Croatia in the 15th and 16th centuries posed the first major existential threat to the script's survival. The Counter-Reformation, alongside other factors, led to the suppression of Glagolitic in Istria in the 16th–17th centuries as well as in the Zagreb archdiocese. The Latinisation of the coastal cities and islands took much longer, where the script continued to be used by the notaries of Krk into the first decade of the 19th century, with education by rural chapters on that island ensuring the survival of the script until well after their abolition by the Napoleon administration in the second decade of the 19th century. Novitiates continued to be educated primarily in the Glagolitic script as late as the third decade of the 19th century. But without centres of education, Latin script and Italian rapidly took over, so that very little was written in the script after the third quarter of the 19th century except for ceremonial purposes, and soon very few could read the cursive script apart from a few scholars.

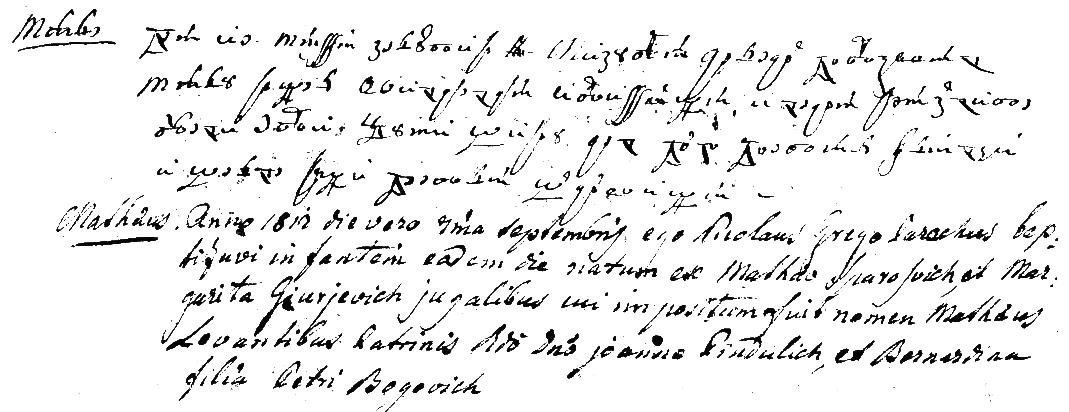
The final Glagolitic entry in the Omišalj parish's baptismal register, by the cleric Nicholas in 1817

1832 journal entry by Mate Puhov of Sali, lay Glagolite

Rural chapter book of Dubašnica, 1820–1846

Because knowledge of Glagolitic became rare even in academia, most efforts surrounding Glagolitic manuscripts in the late modern period focused on transliteration. For example, an ongoing project run by the Centre for Research in Glagolitism of the University of Zadar uses crowdsourcing to speed up the pace of transliterating cursive Glagolitic manuscripts.

Ivan Kukuljević's 1853 note of purchase in Rule of Saint Benedict copy he designated Cod. Glag. X

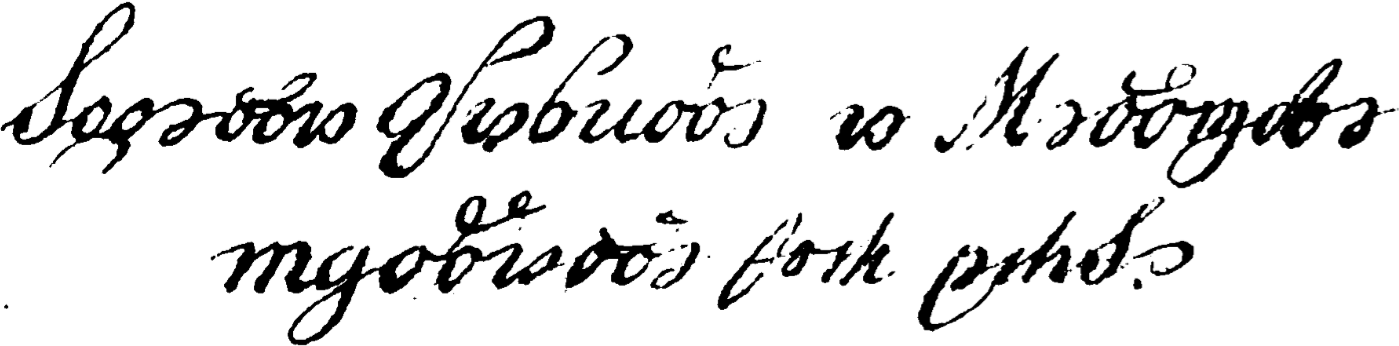
Modernised handwriting of Ivan Berčić in 1860

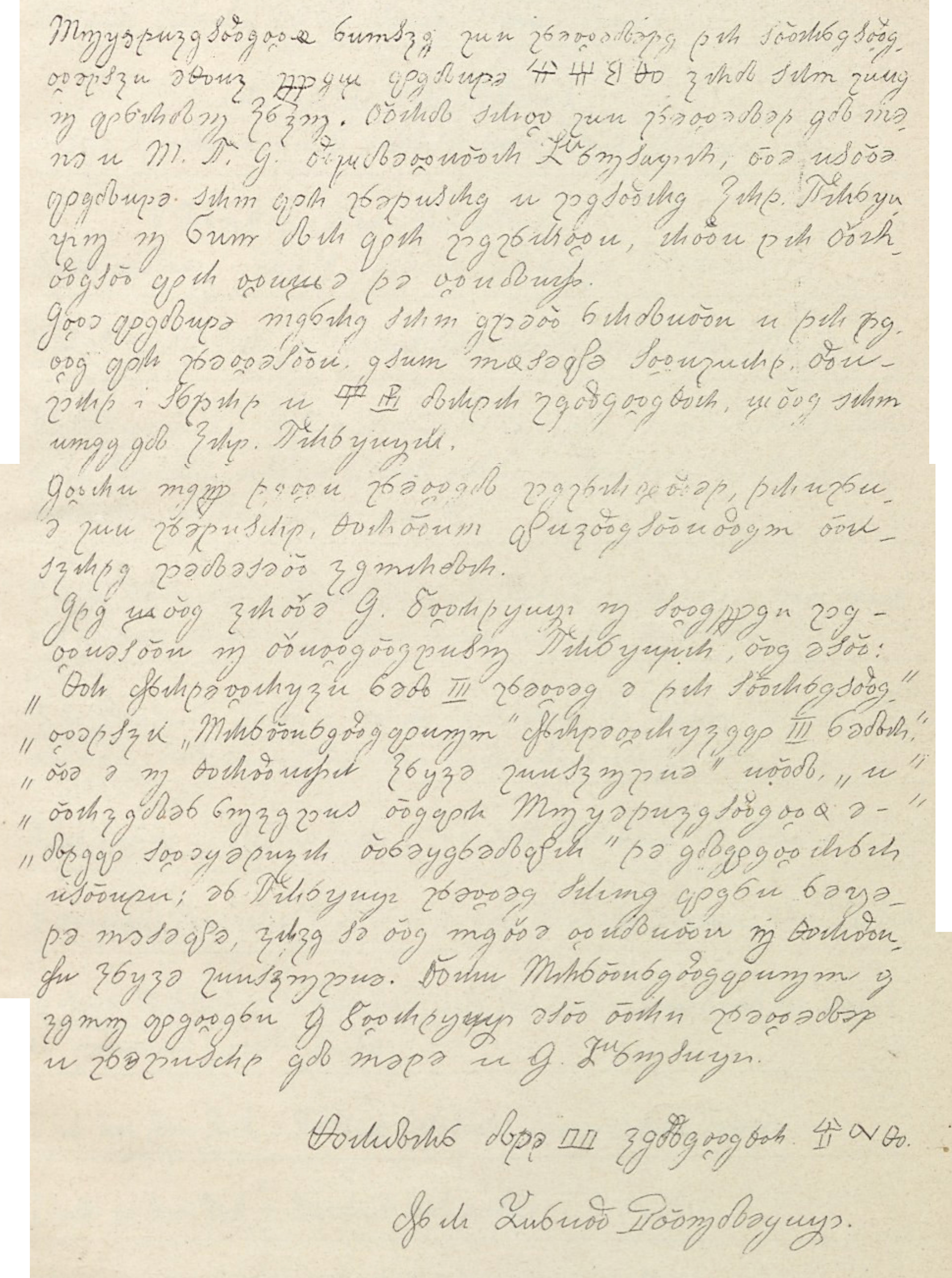
Cyclostyle letter of Ćiril Studenčić dated 1909 within manuscript sent to Vatroslav Jagić from Zadar the following year

=== Academic debates ===
The exact nature of relationship between the Glagolitic alphabet and the Early Cyrillic alphabet, their order of development, and influence on each other has been a matter of great study, controversy, and dispute in Slavic studies since the 19th century.

== Versions of authorship and name ==
A once common belief was that the Glagolitic was created or used in the 4th century by St. Jerome, hence the alphabet was sometimes named "Hieronymian".

It has also acrophonically been called azbuka from the names of its first two letters, on the same model as "alpha" + "beta" (the same name can also refer to Cyrillic and in some modern languages it simply means "alphabet" in general). The Slavs of Great Moravia (present-day Slovakia and Moravia), Hungary, Slovenia and Slavonia were called Slověne at that time, which gives rise to the name "Slovenish" for the alphabet. Some other, rarer, names for this alphabet are Bukvitsa (from common Slavic word "bukva" meaning "letter", and a suffix "-itsa") and "Illyrian" (presumably similar to using the same anachronistic name for the Illyrian (Slavic) language).

In the Middle Ages, Glagolitsa was also known as "St. Jerome's script" due to a popular mediaeval legend (created by Croatian scribes in the 13th century) ascribing its invention to St. Jerome (342–429). The legend was partly based on the saint's place of birth on the border of Dalmatia and Pannonia. He was viewed as a "compatriot" and anachronistically as belonging to the same ethnic group; this helped the spread of the cult of the saint in Dalmatia and was later used to support the idea of the presence of Slavic communities in the Eastern Adriatic Coast from ancient times, but the legend was probably firstly introduced for other reasons, like giving a more solid religious justification for the use of this script and Slavic liturgy. The theory nevertheless gained much popularity and spread to other countries before being resolutely disproven.

Until the end of the 18th century, a strange but widespread opinion dominated that the Glagolitic writing system, which was in use in Dalmatia and Istria along with neighboring islands, including the translation of the Holy Scripture, owe their existence to the famous church father St. Jerome. Knowing him as the author of the Latin Vulgate, considering him – by his own words, born on the border between Dalmatia and Pannonia (remembering that the Dalmatian borders extended well into Istria at that time) – presumed to be an Illyrian, the self-styled Slavic intellectuals in Dalmatia very early began to ascribe to him the invention of glagolitsa, possibly with the intention of more successfully defending both Slavic writing and the Slavic holy service against prosecutions and prohibitions from Rome's hierarchy, thus using the opinion of the famous Latin Father of the Church to protect their church rituals which were inherited not from the Greeks Cyril and Methodius but unknown. We do not know who was the first to put in motion this unscientifically-based tradition about Jerome's authorship of the Glagolitic script and translation of the Holy Scripture, but in 1248 this version came to the knowledge of Pope Innocent IV. <...> The belief in Jerome as an inventor of the Glagolitic lasted many centuries, not only in his homeland, i.e. in Dalmatia and Croatia, not only in Rome, due to Slavs living there… but also in the West. In the 14th century, Croatian monks brought the legend to the Czechs, and even the Emperor Charles IV believed them.

— Jagić, Vatroslav, Glagolitica. Würdigung neuentdeckter Fragmente. Wien, 1890

The epoch of traditional attribution of the script to Jerome ended probably in 1812. In modern times, only certain marginal authors share this view, usually "re-discovering" one of the already-known mediaeval sources.

== Characteristics ==
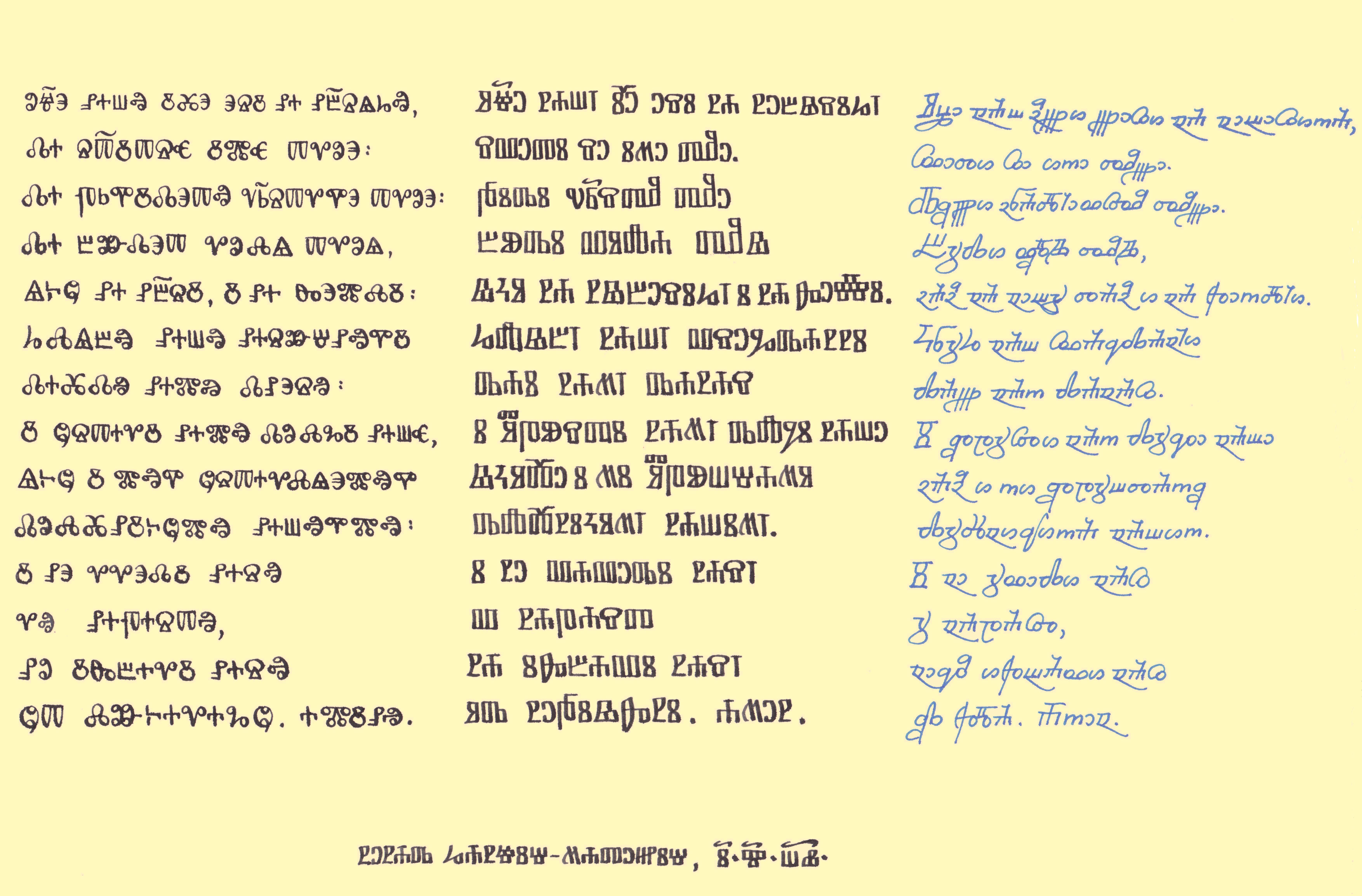
The Lord's Prayer shown in (from left) round, angular, and cursive versions of Glagolitic script

The phonetic values of many of the letters are thought to have been displaced under Cyrillic influence or to have become confused through the early spread to different dialects, so the original values are not always clear. For instance, the letter yu Ⱓ is thought to have perhaps originally had the sound /u/ but was displaced by the adoption of the ligature Ⱆ under the influence of later Cyrillic oѵ, mirroring the Greek ου. Other letters were late creations after a Cyrillic model. It should also be noted that Ⱑ corresponds to two different old Cyrillic letters (Ѣ and Ꙗ), present even in older manuscripts, and not to different later variants of the same Cyrillic letter in different times or places.

The following table lists each letter in its modern order, showing its Unicode representation, images of the letter in both the round and angular/squared variant forms, the corresponding modern Cyrillic letter, the approximate sound transcribed with the IPA, the name, and suggestions for its origin. The Old Church Slavonic names follow the scientific transliteration, while the mostly similar Church Slavonic ones follow an approach more familiar to a generic English speaking reader. Several letters have no modern counterpart. The column for the angular variant, sometimes referred to as Croatian Glagolitic, is not complete as some of the letters were not used following the Croatian recension of Old Church Slavonic.

=== Alphabet ===
Unicode	Round	Angular	Cyrillic	Sound	OCS name	CS name	Meaning	Origin proposals
Ⰰ	Azu	Azu	А	/ɑ/	Azъ	Az	I	Aleph 𐤀/𐢀 or the sign of the cross
Ⰱ	Bouky	Bouky	Б	/b/	Buky	Buki	letters	Unknown, possibly Hebrew bet בּ, Aramaic bīt ܒ or Samaritan mem ࠌ
Ⰲ	Vede	Vede	В	/ʋ/	Vědě	Vedi	(you/he/she/it) knew	Possibly Latin V, cursive Greek upsilon υ or an inverted dobro Ⰴ or sideways beta Β
Ⰳ	Glagolu	Glagolu	Г, Ґ	/ɡ/	Glagoli	Glagoli	speak (past or imperative)	Possibly Carolingian G or cursive Greek gamma γ
Ⰴ	Dobro	Dobro	Д	/d/	Dobro	Dobro	kindness/good/well	Greek delta Δ
Ⰵ	Jestu	Jestu	Є, Е, Э, Ё	/ɛ/	Jestъ	Yest	is/exists	Possibly Samaritan īy ࠄ or Greek sampi ϡ or reversed lunate epsilon ϵ
Ⰶ	Zhivete	Zhivete	Ж	/ʒ/	Živěte	Zhivete	life/live (2nd plural imperative)	Unknown, possibly Coptic janja ϫ or astrological symbol for Pisces ♓︎, Tifinagh ⵣ, Hebrew Shin (letter) ש
Ⰷ	Dzelo	Dzelo	Ѕ	/d͡z/	Dzělo	Zelo	very	Unknown, possibly Armenian ja Ձ
Ⰸ	Zemlja	Zemlja	З	/z/	Zemlja	Zeml(j)a	Earth/ground/soil	Possibly a variant of Greek theta θ or exaggerated Zeta ζ
Ⰹ, Ⰺ	,	Izhe	И	/i/, /j/	Iže	Izhe	which is/the	Possibly Greek upsilon Y or Greek iota with dieresis ϊ
Ⰻ	I	I	Ι, Ї, Ꙇ	/i/, /j/	I/ižei	I/izhey	and	Possibly mimicking the shape of a fish,.
Ⰼ	Gjerv	Gjerv	Ꙉ, Ћ, Ђ	/dʑ/, /tɕ/	Djervь, ǵervь	Cherv, Djerv	tree/wood	
Ⰽ	Kako	Kako	К	/k/	Kako	Kako	how/as	Hebrew qoph ק or script Kappa ϰ
Ⰾ	,	Ljudie	Л, Љ	/l/, /ʎ/	Ljudie	Lyudi	people	Possibly Greek lambda Λ
Ⰿ	Myslite	Myslite	М	/m/	Myslite	Mislete	think (2nd plural)	Greek mu μ. In squared glagolitic it was eventually replaced by a Latin/Cyrillic like form, partly due to its complexity
Ⱀ	,	Nashi	Н, Њ	/n/, /ɲ/	Našь	Nash	ours	Possibly minuscule Greek nu ν
Ⱁ	Onu	Onu	О	/ɔ/	Onъ	On	he, that	Unknown, possibly half of Ot/Omega
Ⱂ	Pokoi	Pokoi	П	/p/	Pokoj	Pokoy	calmness/peace	Possibly a variant of early Greek pi
Ⱃ	Rici	Rici	Р	/r/	Rьci	Rtsi	speak!/pronounce!	Possibly Greek rho ρ
Ⱄ	Slovo	Slovo	С	/s/	Slovo	Slovo	word/speech	Inverse of I/Izhey, possibly for symmetry in the abbreviation ΙΣ for Ἰησοῦς ("Jesus"). Similar to Σ and Aramaic 𐢖
Ⱅ	Tvrido	Tvrido	Т	/t/	Tvrьdo	Tverdo	solid/hard/surely	Perhaps from crossbar of Greek tau τ or Hebrew ת
Ⱆ	Uku	Uku	У, ОУ	/u/	Ukъ	Uk	teaching	Ligature of onъ Ⱁ and izhitsa Ⱛ
Ⱇ	Fritu	Fritu	Ф	/f/	Frьtъ	Fert		Variant of Greek phi φ
Ⱈ	Heru	Heru	Х	/x/	Xěrъ	Kher		[unknown] (similar to glagoli Ⰳ and Latin h) Coptic Ϧ, Armenian Խ
Ⱒ	Ha		Х	/x/	Khlъmъ	Kholm, [spidery kh]	hill	Tetraskelion, possibly as a variant of Georgian k'ani Ⴉ
Ⱉ	Out	Out	Ѡ	/ɔ/	Otъ	Ot, Omega	from	Ligature of onъ Ⱁ and its mirror image or Greek omicron Ο
Ⱌ	Ci	Ci	Ц	/t͡s/	Ci	Tsi		Final form of Hebrew tsade ץ
Ⱍ	Chrivi	Chrivi	Ч, Џ	/t͡ʃ/	Črьvъ	Cherv	worm	[unknown] (similar to shta Ⱋ; perhaps non-final form of Hebrew צ); possibly from Gothic 𐍁; similar to "red-type" 𐌙
Ⱎ	Sha	Sha	Ш	/ʃ/	Ša	Sha	silence/quiet	Hebrew shin ש
Ⱋ	Shta	Shta	Щ	/tʲ/, /ʃt/	Šta/Šča	Shta/Shcha		Ligature of sha Ⱎ over tvrьdo Ⱅ
Ⱏ, Ⱜ	,	,	Ъ	/ŭ/, /ʊ/	Jerъ	Yer		Possibly modification of onъ Ⱁ. The rod-shaped "štapić" variant is probably derived from the apostrophe character.
ⰟⰊ	Jery		Ꙑ	/ɯ/	Jery	Yerɨ		Ligature; digraph of either yer (Ⱏ) or yerь (Ⱐ), followed by either izhe (Ⰹ, Ⰺ) or i (Ⰻ).
Ⱐ	,	Jeri	Ь	/ĭ/, /ɪ/	Jerь	Yerʹ		Possibly modification of onъ Ⱁ
Ⱑ	Jati	Jati	Ѣ, Ꙗ, Я	/æ/, /jɑ/	Jatь	Yat, Ya		Possibly epigraphic Greek alpha Α
Ⱖ			Ё	/jo/				Unknown: Hypothetical component of jonsь Ⱙ below; /jo/ was not possible at the time
Ⱓ	Jou		Ю	/ju/	Ju	Yu		Unknown
Ⱔ	Ensu (small jousu)		Ѧ	/ɛ̃/	[Ensь]	[small yus]		Greek epsilon ε, also used to denote nasality
Ⱗ	Jensu (small jousu)		Ѩ	/jɛ̃/	[Jensь]	[iotated small yus]		Ligature of jestъ Ⰵ and ensь Ⱔ for nasality
Ⱘ	Onsu (big jousu)		Ѫ	/ɔ̃/	[Onsь]	[big yus]		Ligature of onъ Ⱁ and ensь Ⱔ for nasality
Ⱙ	Jonsu (big jousu)		Ѭ	/jɔ̃/	[Jonsь]	[iotated big yus]		Ligature of unknown letter and ensь Ⱔ for nasality
Ⱚ	Thita		Ѳ	/θ/, /t/	[Thita]	Fita	Theta	Greek theta θ
Ⱛ	Yzhica		Ѵ	/ʏ/, /i/	Ižica	Izhitsa		

In older texts, uk (Ⱆ) and three out of four yuses (Ⱗ, Ⱘ, Ⱙ) also can be written as digraphs, in two separate parts.

The order of izhe (Ⰹ, Ⰺ) and i (Ⰻ) varies from source to source, as does the order of the various forms of yus (Ⱔ, Ⱗ, Ⱘ, Ⱙ). Correspondence between Glagolitic izhe (Ⰹ, Ⰺ) and i (Ⰻ) with Cyrillic И and І is unknown.

The Proto-Slavic language did not have the phoneme /f/, and the letters fert (Ⱇ) and fita (Ⱚ) were used for transcribing words of Greek origin, and so was izhitsa (Ⱛ) for the Greek upsilon.

== Unicode ==
The Glagolitic alphabet was added to the Unicode Standard in March 2005 with the release of version 4.1.

The Unicode block for Glagolitic is U+2C00–U+2C5F.

Glagolitic^{[1]} Official Unicode Consortium code chart (PDF)
	0	1	2	3	4	5	6	7	8	9	A	B	C	D	E	F
U+2C0x	Ⰰ	Ⰱ	Ⰲ	Ⰳ	Ⰴ	Ⰵ	Ⰶ	Ⰷ	Ⰸ	Ⰹ	Ⰺ	Ⰻ	Ⰼ	Ⰽ	Ⰾ	Ⰿ
U+2C1x	Ⱀ	Ⱁ	Ⱂ	Ⱃ	Ⱄ	Ⱅ	Ⱆ	Ⱇ	Ⱈ	Ⱉ	Ⱊ	Ⱋ	Ⱌ	Ⱍ	Ⱎ	Ⱏ
U+2C2x	Ⱐ	Ⱑ	Ⱒ	Ⱓ	Ⱔ	Ⱕ	Ⱖ	Ⱗ	Ⱘ	Ⱙ	Ⱚ	Ⱛ	Ⱜ	Ⱝ	Ⱞ	Ⱟ
U+2C3x	ⰰ	ⰱ	ⰲ	ⰳ	ⰴ	ⰵ	ⰶ	ⰷ	ⰸ	ⰹ	ⰺ	ⰻ	ⰼ	ⰽ	ⰾ	ⰿ
U+2C4x	ⱀ	ⱁ	ⱂ	ⱃ	ⱄ	ⱅ	ⱆ	ⱇ	ⱈ	ⱉ	ⱊ	ⱋ	ⱌ	ⱍ	ⱎ	ⱏ
U+2C5x	ⱐ	ⱑ	ⱒ	ⱓ	ⱔ	ⱕ	ⱖ	ⱗ	ⱘ	ⱙ	ⱚ	ⱛ	ⱜ	ⱝ	ⱞ	ⱟ
Notes 1.As of Unicode version 18.0

The Glagolitic combining letters for Glagolitic Supplement block (U+1E000–U+1E02F) was added to the Unicode Standard in June, 2016 with the release of version 9.0:

Glagolitic Supplement^{[1]}^{[2]} Official Unicode Consortium code chart (PDF)
	0	1	2	3	4	5	6	7	8	9	A	B	C	D	E	F
U+1E00x	𞀀	𞀁	𞀂	𞀃	𞀄	𞀅	𞀆		𞀈	𞀉	𞀊	𞀋	𞀌	𞀍	𞀎	𞀏
U+1E01x	𞀐	𞀑	𞀒	𞀓	𞀔	𞀕	𞀖	𞀗	𞀘			𞀛	𞀜	𞀝	𞀞	𞀟
U+1E02x	𞀠	𞀡		𞀣	𞀤		𞀦	𞀧	𞀨	𞀩	𞀪					
Notes 1.As of Unicode version 18.0 2.Grey areas indicate non-assigned code points

== Pre-Glagolitic Slavic writing systems ==
A hypothetical pre-Glagolitic writing system is typically referred to as cherty i rezy (strokes and incisions) – but no material evidence of the existence of any pre-Glagolitic Slavic writing system has been found, except for a few brief and vague references in old chronicles and "lives of the saints". All artifacts presented as evidence of pre-Glagolitic Slavic inscriptions have later been identified as texts in known scripts and in known non-Slavic languages, or as fakes.

== In popular culture ==
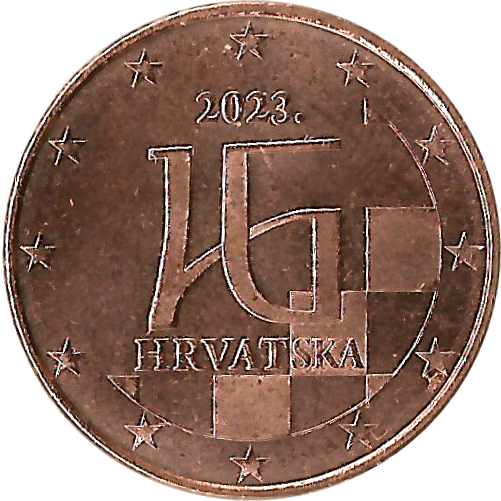
Croatian 5 cent coin with Ⱈ͏Ⱃ ligature

Glagolitic has been the subject of a number of films, including the 2013 feature film Cyril and Methodius: The Apostles of the Slavs and a number of short documentaries: Glagoljica - hrvatska Atlantida (2012), Свещената азбука (2016), the Školski sat episode Hrvatski jezik: Ključ i simboli glagoljice, Hrvatska golagoljica, 1483. tiskana prva knjiga u Hrvata Rimski glagoljski misal, Senjski glagoljski misal and Misal Kneza Novaka.

Television series with Glagolitic include the background of Log Horizon season 2 episode 25.

Glagolitic is sometimes used in video games as a "magical" or "ancient" script. In 2007–2015 (through The Witcher 3), the Glagolitic script was the writing system used in the world of The Witcher video game series. In 2011, it was featured in Cateia Games' Tales from the Dragon Mountain The Strix and then in their Serious Sam 3.

In 2020, Josip Mihaljević designed a free educational game combining Tetris with Glagolitic letters. A number of other Glagolitic educational games have been released:

- Demo Virtual Novak's Missal Exhibition
- Drag the Letter to its Place (2024-05-20)
- Glagolitic Flappy Bird
- Glagolitic Memory Game (2019-02-22)
- Glagolitic Pac-Man 1
- Glagolitic Pac-Man 2 (2018-05-06)
- Glagolitic Space Invaders (2018/2019)
- Glagoljatrix
- Glagoljosmjerka
- Glagomatika (2024)
- Guess the Glagolitic Letter (2017-12-08)
- I Know Glagolitic (2019-02-22)
- I Write Glagolitic (2019-02-22)
- Latinic/Glagolitic (2017-12-13)
- Memory 1 (2016)
- Memory 2 (2016)
- Glagoljosmjerka
- Word of the Month (2024-04-30)

It is also featured on 1 euro cent, 2 euro cent and 5 euro cent coins minted in Croatia.

== See also ==
- Glagolitic Mass (by Janáček)
- Glagolitic numerals
- List of Glagolitic printed works
- Lists of Glagolitic inscriptions
- Lists of Glagolitic manuscripts

== Bibliography ==
- Hocij, Michael (1940). "Die westlichen Grundlagen des glagolitischen Alphabets" [The Western Foundations of the Glagolitic Alphabet]. Südost-Forschungen (in German). 4 (1): 509–600. ISSN 0081-9077.
- Raukar, Tomislav [in Croatian] (1967). "O nekim problemima razvitka ćirilske minuskule ('bosančice'): U povodu rasprave A. Mladenovića, Prilog proučavanju razvitka naše ćirilice, Književnost i jezik, XII, 1965/3, 53-66" [On Certain Problems of the Development of the Cyrillic Minuscule ('Bosančica'): In the Wake of the Article of A. Mladenović]. Historijski zbornik (in Serbo-Croatian). 19–20: 485–499. ISSN 0351-2193.
- Rimac, Marko; Botica, Ivan (2011). "Hrvatska ćirilica u glagoljskim matičnim knjigama zapadno od Krke". 'Az grišni diak Branko pridivkom Fučić' – Radovi međunarodnoga znanstvenog skupa o životu i djelu akademika Branka Fučića (1920. – 1999.) [Croatian Cyrillic in Glagolitic Parish Registers West of the Krka] (in Serbo-Croatian). Zagreb: Hrvatska akademija znanosti i umjetnosti. pp. 521–550. ISBN 978-953-6080-08-3.
- Damjanović, Stjepan (2015-04-28). "Hrvatska ćirilična baština u povijesti Hrvatske kulture i njezino mjesto u hrvatskoj filologiji" [Croatian Cyrillic Heritage in the History of Croatian Culture and its Place in Croatian Philology]. Filologija (in Serbo-Croatian) (62): 1–16. eISSN 1848-8919.
- "Wiedźmiński alfabet – o czym informują nas plakaty w grze Wiedźmin 3: Dziki Gon?". www.grynieznane.pl (in Polish). 7 April 2016. Archived from the original on 27 August 2018.
- Prigorski (29 April 2016). "Želite naučiti glagoljicu? Od danas je na mreži memori igra s glagoljičnim slovima". Prigorski.hr (in Serbo-Croatian). Archived from the original on 14 July 2024.
- Pandžić, Ivan (24 June 2016). "ⰄⰋⰃⰋⰕⰀⰎⰐⰀ ⰃⰎⰀⰃⰑⰎⰌⰋⰆⰀ" [Digital Glagolitic]. Hrvatski jezik (in Serbo-Croatian). 3 (2). eISSN 2718-1847.
- Kuri, Borna; Mihaljević, Josip (2017). "Glagoljica u komercijalnim videoigrama" [Glagolitic in Commercial Video Games]. Bašćina (in Serbo-Croatian). Vol. 18. pp. 40–41. ISSN 1330-366X.
- Radošević, Andrea (2020). "The Glagolitic Tetris Game". Znanstveni centar izvrsnosti za hrvatsko glagoljaštvo. Archived from the original on 10 August 2020.
- Ceković, Blanka (17 February 2021). "Tetris s glagoljicom". Staroslavenski institut (in Serbo-Croatian). Archived from the original on 22 June 2024.
- Pavlović, Daniel (21 June 2021) [defended 2021-06-17]. Poljička ćirilica [Poljica Cyrillic] (Thesis) (in Serbo-Croatian). Zagreb: Filozofski fakultet Sveučilišta u Zagrebu.
- Mihaljević, Josip (2021). "Glagoljica u interaktivnim multimedijima" (PDF). Institut za hrvatski jezik i jezikoslovlje. Archived (PDF) from the original on 27 November 2021.
- "Designs of Croatian national sides of euro and cent coins presented". 4 February 2022.
- Katić, Lovre (3 March 2023) [defended 2023-02-24]. Najraniji ćirilski dokumenti Nadbiskupskog arhiva u Splitu [The Earliest Cyrillic Documents of the Archiepiscopal Archive in Split] (Thesis) (in Serbo-Croatian). Zagreb: Filozofski fakultet Sveučilišta u Zagrebu.
- Botica, Ivan (2024). "Prožimanje pisama hrvatskoga jezika u vremenu i prostoru" [The Spread of Scripts of the Croatian Language in Time and Space]. Prožimanja u hrvatskome jeziku, književnosti i kulturi. Zbornik radova 51. seminara Zagrebačke slavističke škole (in Serbo-Croatian). pp. 31–48.
- Meštrović, Ruža (17 July 2025). Glagoljica u nastavi hrvatskoga jezika [Glagolitic in Croatian Language Class] (Thesis) (in Serbo-Croatian). Zadar: Sveučilište u Zadru.
