= Kiev Missal =

Old Church Slavonic manuscript

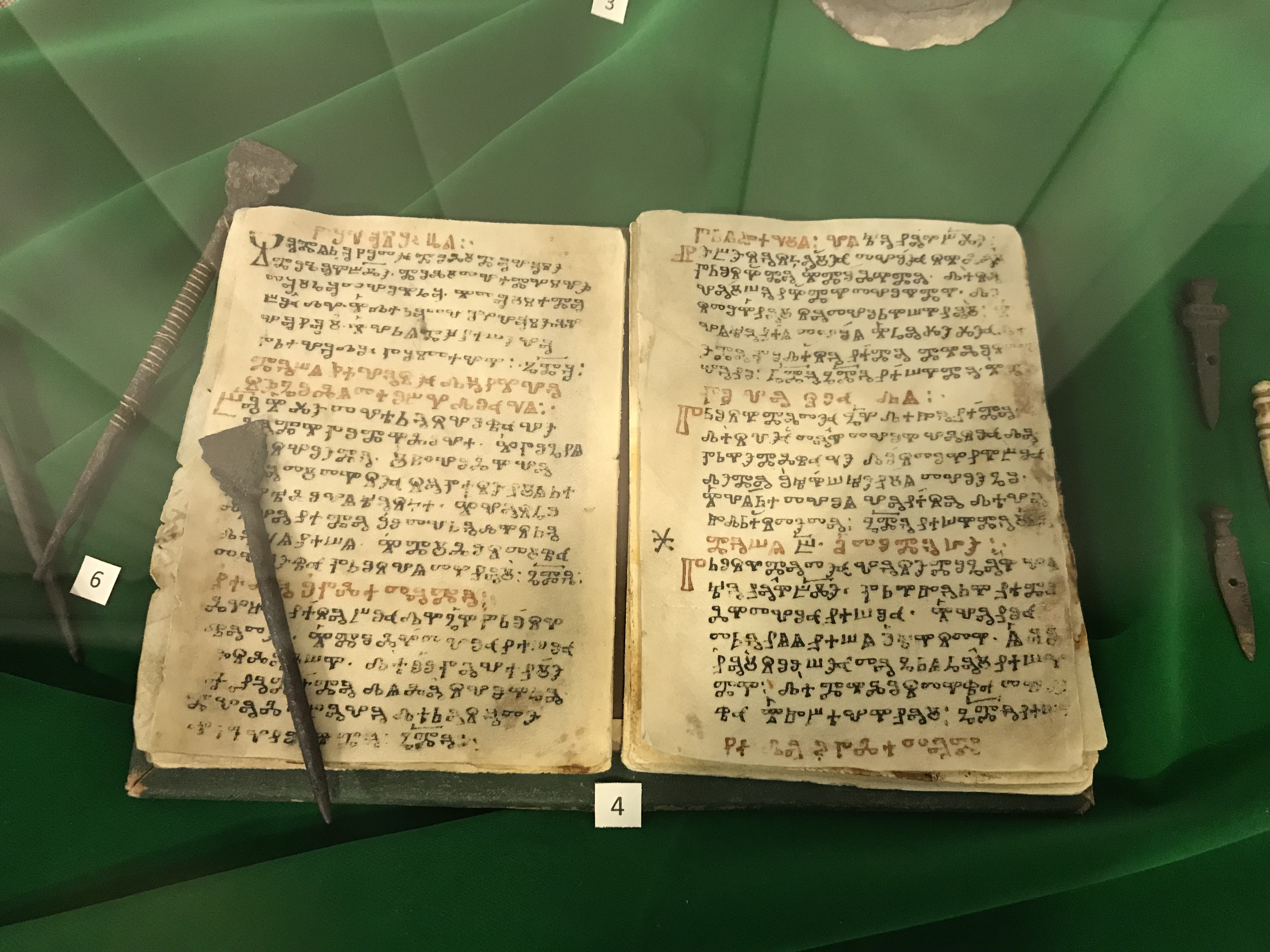
- Pages with Glagolitic writing (Kiev Missal). Copy. Kiev History Museum
- Created: 10th century
- Discovered: 19th century
- Present location: Kyiv

The Kiev Missal (or Kiev Fragments or Kiev Folios; Latin 'Fragmenta Kijoviensia', scholarly abbreviation Kij) is a seven-folio Glagolitic Old Church Slavonic canon manuscript containing parts of the Roman-rite liturgy. It is usually held to be the oldest and the most archaic Old Church Slavonic manuscript, (Note: "The seven glagolitic folia known as the Kiev Folia (KF) are generally considered as most archaic from both the paleographic and the linguistic points of view...") and is dated at no later than the latter half of the 10th century. Seven parchment folios have been preserved in small format (c.14.5 cm × 10.5 cm) of easily portable book to be of use to missionaries on the move.

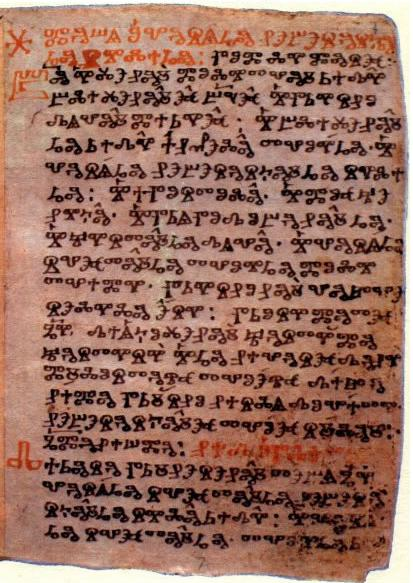
Folio 7r.

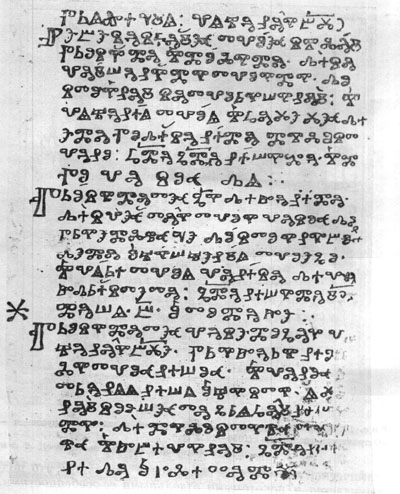
The third folio of Kiev Missal

== Discovery and publishing ==
Kiev Folios were found in the 19th century in Jerusalem by the Archimandrite Andrej Kapustin (Antonin Kapustin), who donated them to the Kiev Theological Academy. After the 1917 Russian Revolution, the folios were transferred to the library of the Ukrainian Academy of Sciences in Kyiv where they are being kept today.

Izmail Sreznevsky made the manuscript known to the public, editing the first edition of Kiev Folios in 1874. They have been republished many times since, though not always successfully. Notable editions are by Vatroslav Jagić in 1890 (Glagolitica. 2. Würdigung neuentdeckter Fragmente, Mit 10 Taf., Wien 1890, Denkschrift. Kaiserl. Akad., Bd. 38), by Sievers in 1924 (Die altslavischen Verstexte von Kiew und Freising, Leipzig 1924, Akad. Wiss., phil.-hist. Kl., Bd. 76/2) and by Mohlberg in 1928 (Il messale di Kiew/sec IX./ed il suo prototipo Romano del VI-VII).

Special attention to the Kiev folios has been paid by Václav Vondrák in a paper O původu Kijevských listů a Pražských zlomků a o bohemismech v starších církevněslovanských památkách vůbec (Praha, 1904). The newest facsimile edition has been published in 1983 in Kiev to honor the ninth International Congress of Slavists which was held there (V. V. Nimčuk, Kijivs′ki hlaholični lystky, AN USSR). That edition contains extensive overview of the existing bibliography of the Kiev Folios.

== Dating and origin ==
The first page of the first folio was written later than other pages, probably at the boundary of the 11th and 12th centuries. Linguistic, paleographic and graphic features indicate South Croatia as its place of origin. This page contains parts of Paul's epistles (13, 11-14 and 14, 1-4). That part of the Kiev Folios and the problems associated with it has been thoroughly analyzed by the Croatian Slavist Marija Pantelić, who finally situated it somewhere in the Dubrovnik area.

The rest of the folios, containing part of the Roman Missal, is dated at no later than the second half of the 10th century.

== Content ==
By content it is a Roman Missal, i.e., a book collecting all the text used at the holy mass service. Missal texts are accompanied by instructions on how to perform rites throughout the liturgical year, called rubrics, which is a term originating from Latin word rubrica designating red soil used for painting.

The text of the Kiev Missal folios has been for the most part written in black (the text meant to be pronounced), and for the lesser part in red (the instructions for gestures that the priest must perform and other instructions for the ceremony). Since the Kiev Missal has only 13 pages preserved, it's obvious that only a part of the missal has been preserved, from the sacramentary containing crucial and unchangeable parts spoken by the priest.

== Linguistic features ==
The Kiev Folios are generally held by Slavists as the oldest among the OCS canon manuscripts, even though they exhibit several West Slavic features that place them at the beginning of the Bohemian-Moravian recension of OCS. These are:

- Instead of OCS št, žd we find West Slavic reflexes of Proto-Slavic */tj/ (also from earlier *kt) and */dj/, i.e. instead of pomoštь, prosęšte, priemljǫšte, daždь, tuždimъ, tъžde we find pomocь, prosęce, priemljǫce, dazь, tuzimъ, tъze etc.
- At the place of Proto-Slavic *stj and *skj we would expect a reflex of OCS št, but we find šč: očiščeniě, zaščiti (imperative), zaščititь.
- As an ending of instrumental singular of masculine o-stems we would expect -omь. But instead, -ъmь is used, so instead of expected oplatomь, obrazomь, vъsǫdomь we find oplatъmь, obrazъmь, vъsǫdъmь.
- Genitive of first-person pronoun azъ is mene in OCS. In Kiev Folios we find mne by the elision of weak yer.

As features that connect Kiev Folios to the canonic manuscripts of other important Slavic area, namely Bulgarian, one has to note:

- consistent distinguishing between yers ъ and ь, and only twice ъ is found where ь is expected
- Kiev folios preserve nasal vowels (/ę/ and /ǫ/) and don't mix them

== Textual features ==
The scribe of folio 1r added a Church Slavonic translation of the oratio of the Modus Terminandi Horas "Protege, Domine, famulos tuos subsidiis pacis, et beatae Mariae [semper Virginis] patrociniis confidentes, a cunctis hostibus reddas securos. Per Dominum nostrum."

С(вѧ)т҃ѣи мари: помлом(сѧ).
защити г҃(оспод)и рабъи своѧ [миръ]
нъими заповѣдъми: и оуп[ъва]
ѧщѧѧ въ застѫпление бл[аже]
нѣи марии, и отъ всѣхъ с[оупос]
татъ нашихъ сътвори н[ъи бе]
с печали · г҃(оспод)а ради нашего
Holy Mary: let us pray.
Protect, O Lord, thy servants with peaceful
commandments; and those trusting
in the intercession of the Blessed
Mary, and make us free from
sorrow from all our adversaries,
for the sake of our Lord.

—f. 1r21–27

== Czech forgery hypothesis ==
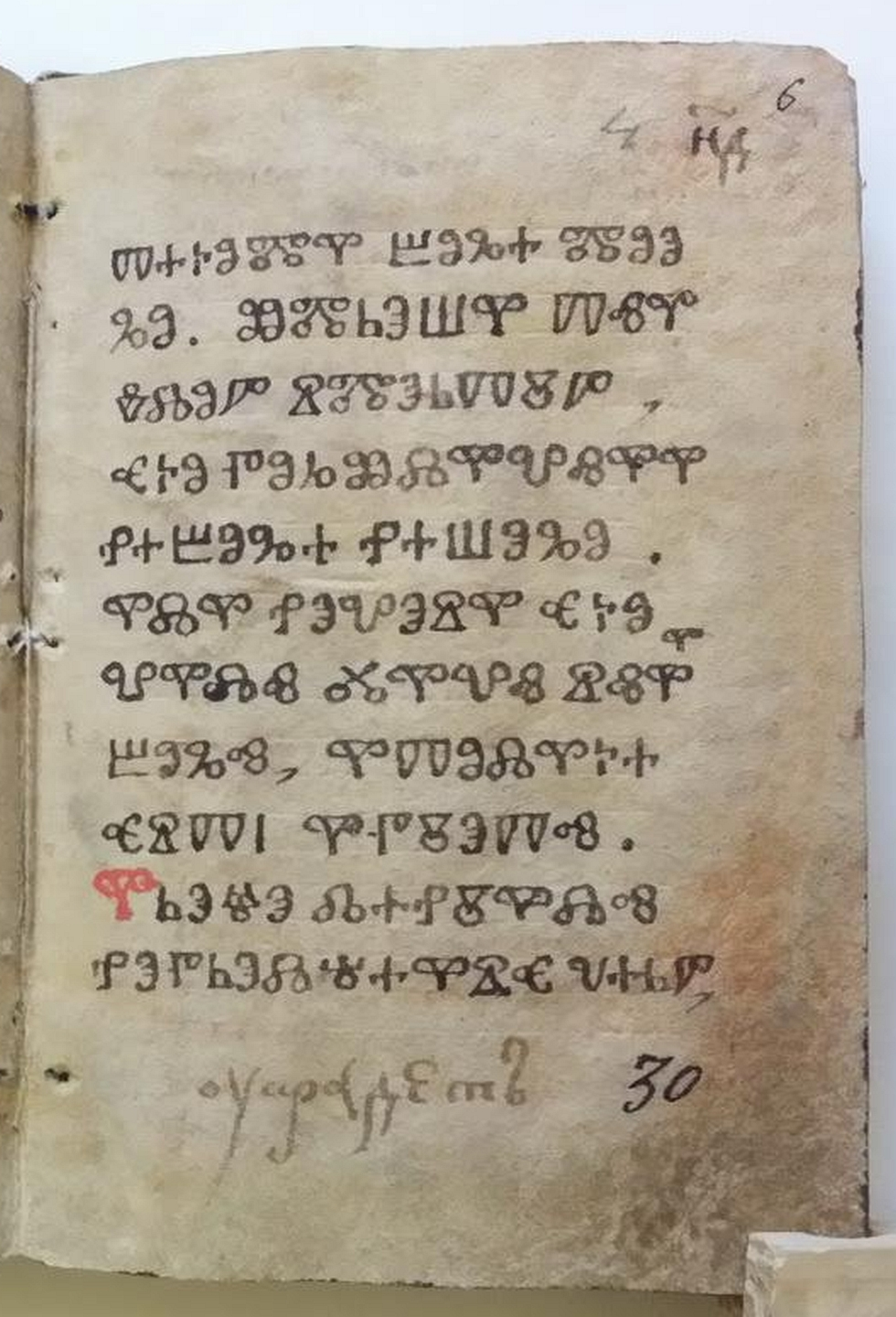
RU-MoGIM Муз. 2149. (partial scan), a 19th century Glagolitic forgery containing the Book of Daniel kept at GIM

Croatian Slavist Josip Hamm stirred a fierce debate in his 1979 book Das Glagolitische Missale von Kiew. In it, and in his other papers and lectures he maintained the view that the Kiev Folios are a 19th-century fake by Czech patriots in order to prove the antiquity of Czech literary culture.

He argued a single hand could have written the text of both 1r and 1v-7v, though not at the same time. Provided the hand was calligraphically skilled enough. The paleographic differences between the Epistle to the Romans and the Hail Mary are not so great that they could not have been bridged by a single, variable hand. Unless the scribe changed between the Epistle to the Romans and the Hail Mary, it follows that a single hand may have written both the Epistle to the Romans with its Eastern text type and the Hail Mary, a translation from Latin. To explain that textual contrast, one must assume the main text on 1v-7v is a sacramentary with Western additions and therefore a change of hands between the Epistle to the Romans and the Hail Mary associated with a change in scribe, but Hamm sees no grounds for such an assumption.

== See also ==
- List of Glagolitic manuscripts (900–1199)
- Lists of Glagolitic manuscripts

== Sources ==
- Ivanovich Sreznevskiy, Izmail (1875). "Сведения и заметки о малоизвестных и неизвестных памятниках" (PDF). Приложение к XXVIII-му тому Записок Имп. Академии наук (in Russian) (1). Saint Petersburg.
- Jagić, Vatroslav (1890). "Glagolitica: Würdigung neuentdeckter Fragmente". Denkschriften der Kaiserlichen Akademie der Wissenschaften in Wien (in German). Vienna: 32.
- Mihaylovich Karinskiy, Nikolai (1904). Хрестоматия по древнецерковнославянскому и русскому языкам (in Russian). Vol. 1. Saint Petersburg.
- Иванович Соболевский, Алексей (1906). "Родина Кіевскихъ отрывковъ". Извѣстія Отдѣленія русскаго языка и словесности Императорской Академии наукъ. 11 (2): 15–19.
- Vondrák, Václav (1906) [written 1905-11-24]. "Über die Provenienz der Kiever Blätter under der Prager Fragmente (Zur Abwehr.)". Archiv für slavische Philologie. 28: 472–478.
- Kuljbakin, Stepan Mihajlovič (1915). Грамматика церковно-славянского языка по древнейшим памятникам [Grammar of the Church Slavonic Language According to Ancient Texts]. Энциклопедия славянской филологии (in Russian). Saint Petersburg.
- Mohlberg, Cuniberto D. (1928). "Il messale glagolitico di Kiew (sec. IX) ed il suo prototipo romano del sec. VI—VII". Atti della Pontificia Accademia Romana di Archeologia (Ser. III), Memorie (in Italian). II. Rome: 207–320.
- Ivanovich Ohienko, Ivan (1929). "Київські Глаголицькі Листки". Пам'ѧтки старо-слов'ѧнської мови Х–XI віків. Warsaw. pp. 75–91.
- Mohlberg, Leo Cunibert (1933). "Zu meinen Untersuchungen über das glagolitische Missale von Kiew". Zeitschrift für Slavische Philologie (in German). 10 (1/2): 100–103. JSTOR 24001566.
- Hamm, Josip (1952-11-30). "Datiranje glagoljskih tekstova" [Dating Glagolitic Texts]. Radovi Staroslavenskog instituta (in Croatian). 1 (1): 5–72.
- Koschmieder, Erwin (1955-09-30). "Die Vermeintlichen Akzentzechen der Kiever Blatter". Slovo: časopis Staroslavenskoga instituta u Zagrebu (in German). 4–5. Old Church Slavonic Institute: 5–23.
- Fučić, Branko (1960-09-15). "Grdoselski ulomak: Prilog kulturnoj geografiji istarskog glagolizma". Starohrvatska Prosvjeta. 7: 185–213.
- Nedeljković, Olga (1964-09-30), "Akcenti ili neume u Kijevskim listićima" (PDF), Slovo: časopis Staroslavenskoga instituta u Zagrebu (in Croatian), 14, Old Church Slavonic Institute: 25–51
- Zagiba, Franz (1964-09-30). "Der historiche Umkreis der Kiever Sakramentarfragmente (Zur Frage der Priorität der Texte westlichen oder östlichen Ritus in der kirchenslavischen Uebersetzungsliteratur)". Slovo: časopis Staroslavenskoga instituta u Zagrebu (in German). 14. Old Church Slavonic Institute: 59–77.
- Gamber, Klaus (1968). "Fragmente eines glagolitischen Sakramentars in Kiew". Codices liturgici latini antiquiores: Pars II. Spicilegii Friburgensis subsidia. Vol. 1 (2nd ed.). pp. 405–406. ISBN 3-7278-0309-6. ISSN 0584-8814.
- Boba, Imre (1971). "The Kievan Leaflets and related Glagolitic texts". Moravia's History Reconsidered: A Reinterpretation of Medieval Sources. The Hague, Martinus Nijhoff. pp. 144–150. ISBN 978-90-247-5041-2.
- Pantelić, Marija (1972-09-30). "Hrvatskoglagoljski odlomak "Missale festivum"". Slovo: časopis Staroslavenskoga instituta u Zagrebu (in Croatian). 22: 5–25. doi:10.31745/s.
- Hamm, Josip (1979). Das glagolitische Missale von Kiew (in German). Vienna.
- Vasil'evich Nimchuk, Vasiliy (1983). Київські глаголичні листки [The Kiev Glagolitic Folia] (in Ukrainian). Kiev.
- Ottovich Schmidt, Sigurd; Petrovna Zhukovskaya, Lidiya; Nikolaevich Pokrovskiy, Nikolay; Igorevna Avtokratova, Mariya; Pavlovich Enin, Gennadiy; Aleksandrovna Knyazevskaya, Olĭga; Vladimirovna Kukushkina, Margarita; Vasilĭevich Lëovochkin, Ivan; Sergeevich Lihachev, Dmitriy; Ivanovich Rogov, Aleksandr; Borisovich Tihomirov, Nikolay; Arkadĭevich Turilov, Anatoliy; B. Shelemanova, N.; Lavrentĭevich Yanin, Valentin; Nikolaevich Shchapov, Yaroslav; Nikolaevich Rozov, Nikolay (1984). Сводный каталог славяно-русских рукописных книг, хранящихся в СССР, XI-XIII вв (in Russian).
- Pantelić, Marija (1985-09-30). "O Kijevskim i Sinajskim listićima" [On Kiev and Sinai folia]. Slovo: časopis Staroslavenskoga instituta u Zagrebu (in Croatian). 35. Old Church Slavonic Institute: 5–56.
- Schaeken, Jos (1987). Die Kiever Blätter [The Kiev Folia] (PDF). Studies in Slavic and General Linguistics (in German). Vol. 9. Amsterdam.
- Hercigonja, Eduard (1996). "Jedan od utemeljitelja Staroslavenskog instituta u Zagrebu, urednik "Slova", paleoslavist i istraživač hrvatsko-glagoljičke jezično-književne baštine". Staroslavenska akademija i njezino značenje (in Croatian). Zagreb. pp. 425–436.
- Nazor, Anica (1995-10-19). "Osvrt na novija proučavanja hrvatskoglagoljskih rukopisa". Radovi Zavoda za povijesne znanosti HAZU u Zadru (in Croatian) (37): 183–206.
- Mincheva, Angelina (1995). "Киевски листове". Кирило-методиевска енциклопедия (in Bulgarian). Vol. 2. pp. 248–260.
- Schenker, Alexander M. (1995), The Dawn of Slavic: An Introduction to Slavic Philology, New Haven: Yale University Press, ISBN 0-300-05846-2
- Žubrinić, Darko (1995). "Croatian Glagolitic Script".
- Žubrinić, Darko (1995). "Kronološki popis najvažnijih glagoljičkih spomenika".
- Grabar, Biserka; Hauptová, Zoe; Mareš, Franjo Većeslav; Klenovar, Marija; Mulc, Ivana; Dürrigl, Marija Ana; Lopina, Vjera; Mihaljević, Milan; Miličić, Irena; Nazor, Anica; Režić, Ksenija; Stipčević, Vesna; Šimić, Marinka; Tandarić, Josip; Vince Marinac, Jasna; Vlašić-Anić, Anica; Zaradija Kiš, Antonija; Bićanić, Sonia; Čunčić, Marija; Mihaljević, Milica; Paro, Frane; Žiljak, Vilko; Bratulić, Josip; Hercigonja, Eduard (2002). ⰔⰎⰑⰂⰅⰔⰀ ⰍⰐⰋⰃⰬ ⰔⰎⰑⰂⰡⰐⰔⰍⰋⰘⰬ ⰅⰈⰋⰍⰑⰮⰬ ⰘⰓⰬⰂⰀⰕⰔⰍⰋⰮⰬ ⰀⰐⰃⰎⰋⰋⰔⰍⰋⰮⰬ ⰃⰓⰬⰝⰔⰍⰋⰮⰬ Ⰻ ⰎⰀⰕⰋⰐⰔⰍⰋⰘⰬ ⰔⰍⰀⰈⰀⰅⰮⰀ. Staroslavenski Institut. ISBN 953-6080-00-1.
- Čunčić, Marica (2001). "Linijski ustroj naslovne glagoljice". Wiener Slavistisches Jahrbuch. 47: 25–31. ISSN 0084-0041. JSTOR 24749668.
- Lunt, Horace G. (2001), Old Church Slavonic Grammar (7h revised ed.), New York: Mouton de Gruyter, ISBN 3-11-016284-9
- Damjanović, Stjepan (2003), Staroslavenski jezik (4th revised and extended ed.), Zagreb: Hrvatska sveučilišna naklada, ISBN 953-169-095-2
- Čunčić, Marica (2004). "Pravilna visina slova Kijevskih listića" [The Regular Height of Letters in the Kiev Folia]. Glagoljica i hrvatski glagolizam: Zbornik radova s međunarodnoga znanstvenog skupa povodom 100. obljetnice Staroslavenske akademije i 50. obljetnice Staroslavenskog instituta (Zagreb-Krk, 2.-6. listopada 2002.). Staroslavenski institut. pp. 485–498. ISBN 953-6080-05-2.
- Denisyuk, Nadiya; Yanko, L. (2003). Київські глаголичні листки: нове дослідження відомої писемної пам'ятки. Kiev.
- Slavova, Tatyana (2003). "Киевски глаголически листове". Старобългарска литература - енциклопедичен речник [Old Bulgarian Literature - Encyclopedic Dictionary] (in Bulgarian). pp. 245–246.
- Damjanović, Stjepan (2004), Slovo iskona (in Croatian), Zagreb: Matica hrvatska, ISBN 953-150-567-5
- Olegovna Vyalova, Svetlana (2006-09-30). "Глаголическе памятники в хранилищах России" [Glagolitic manuscripts kept in the archives of Russia]. Slovo: časopis Staroslavenskoga instituta u Zagrebu (in Russian) (54–55): 171–194.
- Čunčić, Marica; Mokrović, Ljiljana; Magdić, Antonio; Ferenčak, Ivan; Botica, Ivan (2008). "Izvori Staroslavenskog instituta" (in Croatian).
- "Киевские листки". Библиотека Фронтистеса. 2013-01-14.
- Čermák, Václav (2013). "Staroslověnské písemnictví cyrilometodějské a jeho rukopisné dochování" [Cyrillo-Methodian Old Church Slavonic Literature and Its Manuscripts Tradition]. Cyril a Metoděj - doba, život, dílo [Cyril and Methodius - Their Era, Lives and Work] (in Czech). Brno. pp. 55–68.
- Miklas, Heinz; Sadovski, Velizar (2014). "Die Struktur des Altkirchenslavischen" [The Structure of Old Church Slavonic]. Die Slavischen Sprachen. 32 (2): 1252–1275. doi:10.1515/9783110215472.1252. ISSN 1019-2492.
- Гълъбов, Иван (2014-09-10). "Глаголически старобългарски паметници – Киевски листове". Христоматия по история: непрочетените уроци.
- Gadžijeva, Sofija; Kovačević, Ana; Mihaljević, Milan; Požar, Sandra; Reinhart, Johannes; Šimić, Marinka; Vince, Jasna (2014). Hrvatski crkvenoslavenski jezik [The Croatian Church Slavonic Language] (in Croatian). Zagreb: Hrvatska sveučilišna naklada. ISBN 978-953-169-289-2.
- Večerka, Radoslav (2014). "Kyjevské listy a Velká Morava". The Cyril and Methodius Mission and Europe: 1150 Years Since the Arrival of the Thessaloniki Brothers in Great Moravia [The Kiev Fragments and Great Moravia] (in Czech). Institute of Archaeology of the Academy of Sciences of the Czech Republic. pp. 260–261. ISBN 978-80-86023-51-9. OS LG 2023-08-18.
- Hürner, Dana; Miklas, Heinz (2015). A Numerical Approach for Dating and Localising Glagolitic-Old Church Slavonic Documents on Graphemic Grounds (PDF). Vienna.
- Čunčić, Marica; Draganić, Biserka (2017). "Umijeće čitanja, pisanja i tiskanja glagoljice - nematerijalna kulturna baština". Luč: časopis ogranka Matice hrvatske u Velikoj Gorici. 5: 29–36. ISSN 1334-627X.
- Galović, Tomislav (2018). "Intellectual and Cultural History: Croatian Glagolitic, Cyrillic and Latin Written Culture in the Early Middle Ages". Journal of Croatian Studies. 50: 111–138. doi:10.5840/jcroatstud2018504.
- Antonac, Sandi (2018). Hrvatska glagoljica: katalog izložbe [Croatian Glagolitic script] (in Croatian). Nacionalna i sveučilišna knjižnica u Zagrebu. ISBN 978-953-500-176-8.
- Mihaljević, Milan (2018). Jezik najstarijih hrvatskoglagoljskih rukopisa. Zagreb. ISBN 978-953-169-369-1.
- Boiadziev, Andrei (2020-01-25). Старобългарски писмени паметници.
- Cappa, Federica; Miklas, Heinz; Piñar, Guadalupe; Brenner, Simon; Frühmann, Bernadette; Wetter, Wilfried; Schreiner, Manfred; Engel, Patricia; Sterflinger, Katja (2022). "The Kiev Folia: An interdisciplinary approach to unravelling the past of an ancient Slavonic manuscript". International Biodeterioration & Biodegradation. 167 105342. Bibcode:2022IBiBi.16705342C. doi:10.1016/j.ibiod.2021.105342. S2CID 244723388.
