= Lists of Glagolitic manuscripts =

Below are lists of manuscripts written in the Glagolitic script by date:

- List of Glagolitic manuscripts (900–1199)
- List of Glagolitic manuscripts (1200–1299)
- List of Glagolitic manuscripts (1300–1399)
- List of Glagolitic manuscripts (1400–1499)
- List of Glagolitic manuscripts (1500–1599)
- List of Glagolitic manuscripts (1600–1699)
- List of Glagolitic manuscripts (1700–1799)
- List of Glagolitic manuscripts (1800–1899)
- List of Glagolitic manuscripts (1900–present)
- List of undated Glagolitic manuscripts

== See also ==
- Lists of Glagolitic inscriptions
- List of Glagolitic printed works
- List of medieval Serbian manuscripts
- List of medieval Bosnian manuscripts
