= List of Glagolitic manuscripts (1200–1299) =

This is a list of manuscripts written in the Glagolitic script in the 13th century.

== List ==
Light red represents manuscripts with Glagolitic only in inclusions or paratext.
Pale red represents mixed manuscripts with Glagolitic as a main script.

Type	Abbreviation	Date	Designation	Library	Place of origin	Folia	Dimensions	Columns and rows	Notes	Scans
missal	FgSpal	1200s (early)	br. 468 (or 1468)	Kaptolski arhiv, Split	Bosnia and Herzegovina	1	30 x 22 cm	2 co	Splitski odlomak misala (Split missal fragment). Found by Vjekoslav Štefanić. Used in binding of the Cartulary of Saint Anastasia at Split. One of the last uses of Glagolitic in Bosnia. Described by Vjekoslav Štefanić in 1957.	1957 (2006)
breviary	Fg(Br)Lond	1200s (early)	Add. 31,951	British Library	Croatia	1	30.5 x 22 cm		Londonski odlomak brevijara (London breviary fragment). Described by Vajs in 1914.	
legal		1230 (December 30)			Dobrinj				Juraj Pariježić nadaruje crkvu sv. Jurja kod Dobrinja, koju je sám i sagradio. Transcription of Petriš translation published by Ivan Crnčić in "Katolički list" 1860, br. 29. Original lost. Survives only in 1724 translation by Petar Petriš of Latin translation by Benetto Grabbia. Transcribed by Ivan Črnčić then transliterated into Glagolitic by Kukuljević.	
psalter	PsBol	1230–1241	No. 2499	University of Bologna Library	Macedonia	263			Bologna Psalter (Pogodin Psalter). In Cyrillic but with some Glagolitic letters and words in the commentary.	
festal menaion		1260	Sinodalna collection No 895	GIM-Moskva	Russia	232			Cyrillic but with unclear Cyrillic-Glagolitic paratext on f. 176v. The last part of the manuscript dates to 1352 but the paratext is on a page dating to 1260.	
dedication		1288			Trsat	1			Written by Stipan od Staroga Dubrovnika bishop of Modruš. Discovered by Franjo Glavinić in 1614 in the crkva sv. Luke by Trsat. Published in Historia Tersattana by Glavinić 1648 in Udine, then by Valvasor in Die Ehre des Herzogthums Krain 1689 in Ljubljana. Bibliography:	
fourfold gospel	Pri	1200s	RPK No 312	Научна библиотека на Санкт-Петербургская държавен университет		152			Cyrillic with Glagolitic used functionally on folia 97r, 104v, 105r, 112v, 113r, 136v, 1374.	
missal		1200s	III a 36 (negativni otisak)	Arhiv HAZU		1	20.5 x 16 cm	2 co	Negativni otisak u Kopijalnoj knjizi obitelji Tanić. A missal fragment once used as a cover for the III a 36 left a negative print. Text includes Psalm 17. It was taken off at some point and Štefanić could not locate the original cover. One photograph in Štefanić 1970.	
missal		1200s, 1800s	Berčićevo sobranje fragmenata II, 67, 68	Petersburg (гос. публ. библиотека)		2 + 2			68 is a fragment of a Glagolitic missal from the 13th century and 67 is a Latinic transliteration by Berčić with some Glagolitic letters on 67v. 68 was acquired by Berčić in Brbinj, then photographed by Berčić; later photographed in Jagić under XIII, 27.	IzSt (2008; on 202–205)
breviary		1200s	Berčićevo sobranje fragmenata I, 20, 21	Petersburg (гос. публ. библиотека)		2			Dva ostriška iz istoga rukopisa. Very old. Acquired by Berčić in Tkon 1850. Facsimile in Milčetić 1955 (posthumous) of one side for 20 and 21.	IzSt (2008), IzSt (2008; on 520–521), IzSt (2008)
epistolary	EpKar	1200s	Slav. 1 (239)	Karakallou Monastery	Bulgaria	169			Karakallou epistolary (Каракалски апостол). Cyrillic with Glagolitic on folia 40v and 60r.	
epistolary	EpStr	1200s	IX E 25 (IX.E.25)	Prague National Museum	Bulgaria	91			Cyrillic with Glagolitic Xěrъ on folio 81r.	
triodion		1200s	933 (58 f.), MF-1 (1 f.), Archive of Kiril Mirčev (2 f.)	NBKM, DARM, Archive of Kiril Mirčev		59			Cyrillic with 2 Glagolitic words on 2v14 of NBKM 933.	
octoechos	OctScu	1200s	1511 (M II 4)	Library of the Institute of literary history at the Philosophical faculty of the University of Skopje		3			Cyrillic with 2 Glagolitic words on folio Iv19. Folia bound to Octoechos from 1500 as protection.	
		1200s	Sinodalna collection No 478	GIM-Moskva	Russia	271			Oгласителни поучения на Кирил Йерусалимски. Cyrillic manuscript 11th-12th century, but Glagolitic addition on f. 270v likely from 1200s judging by similarity to Cyrillic hand of 271r.	
charter		1200s	Погод. 68	National Library of Russia		2	20,5 × 16 cm	4 co	Moscow Glagolitic Leaflets. Commentary on the Book of the Prophet Daniel.	NLR
missal		1400s	Berčićevo sobranje fragmenata II, 69	Petersburg (гос. публ. библиотека)		1	14.8 x 10.8 cm		Acquired by Berčić in Ugljan 1848.	IzSt (2008; on 200–201)
		1200s	4.9.39 (Финл. 40)	BRAN-Sankt Peterburg	Russia	2			Сборник със слова и поучения. Cyrillic with Cyrillic-Glagolitic note on folio 2r.	
missal	Fg(Mi)Kuk	1200s (or second half, or late 1200s to middle 1200s or 1100s)	Fragm. glag. 3	Arhiv HAZU	Croatia	1	32 x 22 cm	2 co 26 ro	Kukuljevićev odlomak misala (Kukuljević missal fragment, Missale Glagoliticum Kukuljevićianum). Once used as a cover for a codex dated by Kukuljević to the 14th century per Jagić 1866. Acquired by Kukuljević. Photograph of one page published in Štefanić 1970.	
missal	Fg(Mi)Birb	1200s	Berčić Collection (F. 67)	Russian National Library	Croatia	1	14.8 x 10.8 cm		Birbinjski odlomak misala (Brbinj missal fragment). Found by Ivan Berčić in Brbinj.	
breviary	Fg(Br)Roč (αRoč)	1280–1320 (about)	Cod. Slav. 4	Austrian National Library	Croatia	1	35.5 x 24 cm		List brevijara dodan Ročkomu misalu (Breviary folio added to the Roč Missal). Photocopy by 1995 housed in Zagreb. Bibliography:	ÖNB
breviary	Fg(Br)Tk	1200s	Berčić collection, N. 9	Russian National Library	Croatia				Tkonski odlomak iz Berčićeve zbirke (Tkon fragment from Berčić's collection). Acquired by Berčić in 1850. Two fragments of the same folio.	
breviary	Fg(Br)Ts+Fg(Br)Zg (Ts 81 + 46 ab)	1200s (by end)	Ms. Misc. 81, Fragm. glag. 46 a+b	Arhiv HAZU, Trieste (Biblioteca civica)	Kvarner	1+2	18.3 x 14 cm, 13.9 x 18.2 cm		Trieste and Zagreb Breviary Fragments (Tršćanski odlomak brevijara i Zagrebački odlomak brevijara, Terstský zlomek breviáře). Jagić 1911 published a photograph on table XIV. Dialectal influence (especially če) may point to Vrbnik, Omišalj or Cres as the place of writing. Once used in the cover of a Latinic book. Acquired by Kukuljević 6 January 1867 from Stefan Kocijančić in Gorica, who acquired them from his students in Istria and Kvarner. The two were shown by Nazor 1993 to belong to the same codex. Parchment. Photocopies in Zagreb by 1977. Photograph of one page published in Štefanić 1970. The discovery of the Trieste fragment was first published by Bonazza 1979. Bibliography:	1995 (Ts), IzSt (Ts, 2008), IzSt (Ts, 2008), IzSt (Ts, 2009), IzSt (Ts), IzSt (Ts)
breviary	Fg(Br)Vb	1200s	n/a	Vrbnik parish library	Krk (probably)	2	17 x 10 cm		Vrbnički odlomci brevijara (First Vrbnik breviary fragment). Fragments A (17 x 19 cm), B (27 x 22 cm), C (29.5 x 23 cm), D (23 x 20.7 cm). Found together with Fg(Br)Vb₂. Leaves A and D belonged to the same breviary, while B and C to a different manuscript. They were used as wrappings for some parish documents. Photocopies in Zagreb from 1989 on. Bibliography:	IzSt (2009)
breviary	Fg(Br)αNov	1200s	Cod. Slav. 8*	Austrian National Library	Croatia	1	32 x 24.5 cm		Prvi list brevijara dodan Misalu kneza Novaka (First breviary folio added to Novak's Missal). Photocopy in Zagreb made 1978. Bibliography:	ÖNB, NSK, (2009), IzSt (2009)
breviary	Fg(Br)βNov	1200s	Codex slave 8** (Cod. Slav. 8**)	Austrian National Library	Croatia	1	32 x 24.5 cm		Drugi list brevijara dodan Misalu kneza Novaka (First breviary folio at end of Novak's Missal). First photocopy in Zagreb made 1978. Bibliography:	ÖNB, IzSt (2009), IzSt (2009)
aprakos gospel		1200s	F.п.I.99	National Library of Russia		154 + 2	23,9 × 16,2 cm	2 co	Palimpsest, aprakos gospel short written in double script Cyrillic and Glagolitic one of the top of each other. Commonly known as "Palimpsest Verkovitcha".	NLR
miscellany	CSin	1200s	Q.п.I.63 + Q.п.I.64 + Греч. 70 + Sin. Slav. 18/N	National Library of Russia, Saint Catherine's Monastery		6 + 8 + 119 + 8	19 x 13,5 cm	1 co	Sinai Palimpsest. Cyrillic over Glagolitic.	NLR
homiliary	Fg(Hom)Lab_{1}	1200s	Ms 368/5	NUK	Croatia	2	31.6 x 23.4 cm		First Ljubljana homiliary (Prvi ljubljanski homilijar). Partial facsimile in Vajs 1910 (IA). Bibliography:	NSK, GHR, IzSt (2017 from NUK), IzSt (2008)
Acts of Paul and Thecla	FgTh	1200s (or second half; or 1100s)	Fragm. glag. 4	Arhiv HAZU	Croatia	2	35 x 26 cm	2 co 31 ro	Odlomak Legende o svetoj Tekli (Fragment of the Legend of Saint Thecla). A note by Kukuljević points to it having been attached to the cover of BrN_{2}. Kukuljević brought it to Zagreb, by 1853 on the evidence of Šafařík. Entered Arhiv JAZU with the Kukuljević collection. Photograph of one page published in Štefanić 1970. A photocopy had been made by 1977 (Star. inst. F 63) and a microfilm by 1978 (Star. inst. M 90). Bibliography:	IzSt (2008), IzSt (2008)
passional	FgPass	1200s	sign. Ms Vegl. 30 A, B, C	Krk (Archive of the former Old Church Slavonic Institute)	Vrbnik	3	34 x 25.5 cm	2 co	Krčki odlomci pasionala (Krk passional fragments). Contains Mučenje 40 mučenika, Mučenje sv. Jurja, Periodi sv. Ivana, Homilija o smrti. Parchment. Formerly part of the cover of BrVb_{4}. Bibliography:	IzSt (2009)
miscellany	FgEpist	1200s (second half)	Cod. Slav. 55* und 55**, Fragm. glag. 123	Arhiv HAZU	Croatia	2	20.3 x 13.2 cm	2 co 16 ro	Odlomak zbornika (Epistola o nedjelji). It was attached to Greblov kvaresimal of Vrbnik. Once part of Jerko Gršković collection in Vrbnik, where it was found 1959 after being considered lost thanks to having been separated from the kvaresimal. Photograph of one page published in Štefanić 1970. Photocopies and microfilms had been made by 1977 and 1978 (Star. inst. F 89, M 93). Bibliography:	IzSt (2008), IzSt (2008)
breviary	Fg(Br)Ri_{1}	1200s (late)	n/a	Capuchin Monastery of Our Lady of Lourdes in Rijeka	Croatia	1	13.6-13.7 x 24.2-24.4 cm		Riječki odlomak Mudrih izreka (Rijeka Proverbs fragment).	
missal	Fg(Mi)Bel	1200s (end)	XXXVI	Krk (Osor bishopric archive)		1	21 x 31 cm		Belski odlomak misala (Belsky missal fragment). Once covered the Popis desetine Beloga na Cresu iz 1679.	
breviary		1200s (end)				1	20 x 8 cm		Part of Jerko Gršković collection in Vrbnik. Parchment.	
homiliary	FgHom	1200s (end)	Fragm. glag. 16	Arhiv HAZU	Croatia	2	30 x 21 cm		Homilija na Blagovijest (Homily on the Gospel). Found by Ivan Milčetić while a student 1875 in Omišalj. He gave it to JAZU. Facsimile published 1957. Photograph of one page published in Štefanić 1970. Bibliography:	IzSt (2008), IzSt (2008)
missal	FgHloh	1200s/1300s	C 402 A, B	Slovak National Library	Croatia	2	A 19 x 16 cm, B 16.5 x 19 cm	2 co	Hlohovec folia (Hlohovské listy). Once used for cover of 1642 Italian book Trattato dell'amor di Dio. Discovered 1936 in the library of the former Franciscan monastery of Hlohovec by Vševlad Jozef Gajdoš. Transcriptions published by Miškovič and by Slaninka. First photocopies in Zagreb made 1984. Bibliography:	WDL, IzSt (2017)
missal		1200s/1300s	Fragm. glag. 15 ("Fragmenti II")	Arhiv HAZU		2	27.8 x 24.8 cm	2 co 28 ro	Dva lista misala. Text type of redaction related to MBrb. Once used for cover of 17th century book of the library of the Capuchin Monastery of Rijeka. Acquired by Kukuljević. Entered JAZU with Kukuljević collection. Parchment. Photograph of one page published in Štefanić 1970. Bibliography:	
missal		1200s/1300s	Fragm. glag. 104	Arhiv HAZU		1	17.5 x 16.6 cm	2 co	Komad lista misala. Given to JAZU by Vladoje Dukat who found it among the remains of Adam Alojzije Baričević (1756–1806). Parchment. Photograph of one page published in Štefanić 1970.	
missal		1200s/1300s	Fragm. glag. 112	Arhiv HAZU		55 (about)			Hum strips (Humski ostrišci misala). 50 small strips. Removed from the altar triptych of Anton iz Padove in Hum (Istria) while being restored at the Restauratorski zavod Jugoslavenske akademije in Zagreb 1950. Parchment.	IzSt (2009)
missal	Fg(M)Vod (Mf)	1200s/1300s	OR 2	Staroslavenski institut in Zagreb		2	25.6 x 17.4 cm	2 co 21 ro	Fragment of Missale Festivum (Zagrebački fragment blagdanskog misala). Used for the cover of a ledger in use 1664–1743 and mentioning Millstatt, Töplitz, Babina dolina and other toponyms pointing to Carinthia (also housed at Knjižnica Staroslavenskog instituta, as OR 5). It was bought by Ivan Vodopija at Ljubljana in the 19th century. First reported by Marija Pantelić in 1972. Bibliography:	1972 (2006), IzSt (2012)
epistolary	Fg(Ap)Om	1200s/1300s	n/a	Krk, Archive of former Old Church Slavonic Institute	Croatia	1	29 x 21.5 cm	2 co	Omišaljski list apostola (Omišalj apostle folio). Parchment. Discovered 1955 and removed from cover of 1602 book Ordo baptizandi et alia sacramenta administrandi by Josip Hamm in 1956. Was at Omišalj. Brought to Krk. Lost as of 2018. Microfilm made by 1978 (Star. inst. M 53b). Bibliography:	
breviary	BrVb₁	1200s/1300s	n/a	Vrbnik parish library	Vrbnik	259	35 x 27 cm	2 co x 33 ro	Prvi vrbnički brevijar (First Vrbnik breviary). Written by 3 hands. Microfilm made by 1952 for JAZU.	IzSt (2011)
breviary		1200s/1300s	R 18.370	NUK		1	19.1 x 14 cm		Ljubljanski fragment brevijara. Contains Psalm 17,30-51. Discovered in Rome. Acquired by NUK.	2002 (2006), IzSt (2017 from NUK)
breviary		1200s/1300s	Fragm. glag. 14	Arhiv HAZU		1	32.4 x 26.4 cm	2 co 30 ro	List brevijara (lekcionara). Acquired by Kukuljević in Gorica from S. Kocijančić on 6 January 1867. Photograph of one page published in Štefanić 1970. Bibliography:	IzSt (2008)
breviary		1200s/1300s	Fragm. glag. 26	Arhiv HAZU		1	14.8 x 21.8 cm		Komad lista brevijara. Once used as cover of manuscript of pop Antun Franki of Omišalj sign. III a 5. Acquired by Kukuljević from Stjepan Kocijančić in Gorica, who acquired it from some theology student from Omišalj. Scribe identical to that of Fragm. glag. 14.	IzSt (2009)
breviary	Fg(br)J26	1200s/1300s	Sign. Fragm. glag. 26	NSK	Croatia	1	14.8 x 21.8 cm	2 co	Odlomak brevijara JAZU 26 (JAZU 26 breviary fragment).	NSK – correct scan?
breviary		1200s/1300s	Berčićevo sobranje fragmenata I, 96 (159), 97 (160), 161	Petersburg (гос. публ. библиотека)		2	23 x 17 cm		Dva lista. Acquired by Berčić from Korčula in 1862. Both from same manuscript. Contains the biblical story of Noah. Photograph in Karinski. Facsimile of one side of 97 in Milčetić 1955.	IzSt (96: 2008), IzSt (97: 2008)
Chrysorrhoas		1200s/1300s	386	Hilandar Monastery	Serbia	286			Hilandar Chrysorrhoas (Златоструй хилендарски). Cyrillic with 1 full and 1 partial Glagolitic words on f. 50r.	
Pandects of Nikon of the Black Mountain		1200s/1300s	ф. 196 оп. 1 No 1698	RGADA	Russia	193			Pandects of Nikon of the Black Mountain. Cyrillic with Glagolitic abecedary on folio 93r, including the first 5 letters of the copyist.	
		1200s/1300s, 1500s		Omišalj (Crkva Uznesenja BDM)	Omišalj?	30+			Omišaljski relikvijarni zapisi. Paper strips with the names of saints found inside a reliquiary at the Crkva Uznesenja BDM in Omišalj. The first group was entered in the late 13th or early 14th centuries, and the second group was entered in the 15th century while Matej Vidić was parish priest. Many saints are "Czech" or "Polish", leading some to conclude a connection to the Glagolitic monasteries there. The saints named are: sv. Stanislav, Božji grob, sv. Toma Apostol, sv. Agnie iliti Janja, sv. Vikturija iliti Viktor, sv. Semiona Stlpnika iliti Šimun Stilita, 11.000 djevica, sv. Martin, sv. Aleksandar, sv. Većeslav, sv. Pangracije iliti Pankracije, sv. Šimun i Juda, sv. Ožvald kralj iliti sv. Osvald, sv. Ljudmila, sv. Mauricij, sv. Kuzma i Damjan, sv. Nerej, sv. Stanislav, sv. Ilija, sv. Doroteja djevica, sv. Margareta, sv. Klara djevica.	IzSt (2008) [low res.]
miscellany	CBer	1200s/1300s	Vuk Karadžić collection No. 48	SBB	Bulgaria	135			Berlin miscellany (Берлински сборник, Berlinski zbornik). Cyrillic with Glagolitic letter Dobro on f16r8.	
breviary		1200s/1300s	Berčićevo sobranje fragmenata I, 7, 8 (old 8 (15))	Petersburg (гос. публ. библиотека)		2	20.2 x 16.2 cm	2 co	Acquired by Berčić in Prvić on 31 December 1852.	IzSt (2008; on 538–541), IzSt (2008)
breviary		1200s (end) / 1300s (beginning)	Berčićevo sobranje fragmenata I, 18 (old 18, 29)	Petersburg (гос. публ. библиотека)		1	21.2 x 14.2 cm	2 co	Acquired by Berčić in sv. Martin on Cres 1848.	IzSt (2008), IzSt (2008; on 524–525)
breviary		1200s (end) / 1300s (beginning)	Berčićevo sobranje fragmenata I, 126, 127	Petersburg (гос. публ. библиотека)		2		2 co 34 ro	Script old. One side of 126 photographed by Milčetić. Acquired from Gurato of Rab 9 December 1866.	IzSt (2008), IzSt (2008; on 336–339)
fragments		1200s-1500s	R 3330	NSK	Boljun	14			Fragmenta Croato-glagolitica. Includes multiple manuscripts.	NSK
