= Slovo (Zagreb) =

- Discipline: Church Slavonic studies
- Language: English
- Edited by: Vida Vukoja

Publication details
- Former name(s): Slovo: časopis Staroslavenskog instituta "Svetozar Ritig", Slovo: časopis Staroslavenskog zavoda "Svetozar Ritig" Instituta za filologiju i folkloristiku
- History: 1952-present
- Publisher: Old Church Slavonic Institute (Croatia)
- Frequency: Annual

Standard abbreviations
- ISO 4: Slovo

Indexing
- ISSN: 0583-6255 (print); 1849-1049 (web)

Links
- Journal homepage

Slovo is an annual academic journal edited and managed by the Old Church Slavonic Institute. It is a Slavistics publication with a focus on Church Slavonic, including the Glagolitic script. The journal was and continues to be a print journal, but since 2006 is also available online. It was established in 1952. Each issue begins with articles, transitions through reviews, and ends with news.

== History ==
Josip Hamm was editor-in-chief of issues 1–12, Vjekoslav Štefanić of issues 13–24, and Anica Nazor of the issues that followed.

Issue 6–8 was published as a "Collection dedicated to Josef Vajs on the occasion of the 60th annerversary of his arrival in Croatia" (Croatian: Zbornik posvećen Josipu Vajsu prilikom 60-te godišnjice njegova dolaska u Hrvatsku). Issue 13 was dedicated to the 1100th annerversary of the invention of Glagolitic. Issue 15–16 was dedicated o Vjekoslav Štefanić on his 65th birthday. Issue 21 was published as a collection with the title "Glagolitic: eleven centuries of a great tradition" (Croatian: Glagoljica: jedanaest stoljeća jedne velike tradiije). Issue 24 published papers from the symposium on the Slavonic Patericon held 19–22 May 1974 in Vienna. Issue 28 published papers from the scientific conference on the Slavonic Patericon held 17–18 October 1977 in Kraków.

== Selected works ==
- Tandarić, Josip (1981-12-18). "Slovo, Časopis Staroslavenskog instituta u Zagrebu". Croatica Christiana periodica. 5 (8): 102–126. Includes a summary of every article published up to that point.

== See also ==
- List of Slavic studies journals

== Sources ==
- Hrčak (2006–2024). "Slovo: časopis staroslavenskog intituta". Hrčak: Portal hrvatskih znanstvenih i stručnih časopisa (in Croatian). Archived from the original on 2008-06-19.
- StIn (2017-09-18). "Ravnateljica dr. sc. Marica Čunčić odlazi u mirovinu" [Rector dr. sc. Marica Čunčić Leaves for Retirement]. Staroslavenski institut (in Croatian). Archived from the original on 2021-09-22.
- StIn (2021). "Časopisi Staroslavenskoga instituta: Slovo i Radovi" [Periodicals of the Old Church Slavonic Institute: Slovo and Radovi]. Staroslavenski institut (in Croatian). Archived from the original on 2021-03-06.
