= Svetozar Rittig =

Croatian priest and politician

Msgr Svetozar Rittig
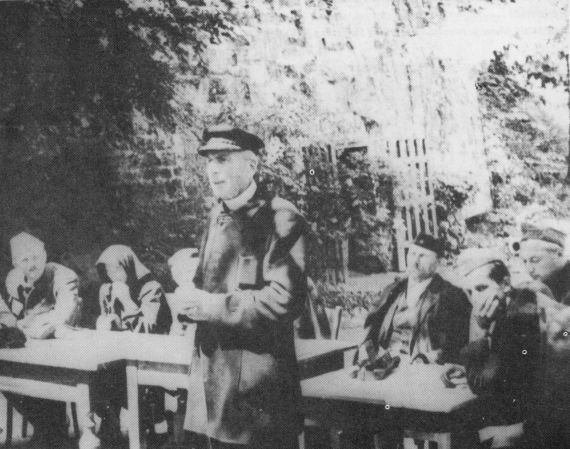
- Rittig holding a speech at the founding meeting of the Unitary National Liberation Front in Topusko, 1944
- Church: Roman Catholic Church
- Archdiocese: Zagreb

Orders
- Ordination: 1895

Personal details
- Born: April 6, 1873 Slavonski Brod, Kingdom of Croatia-Slavonia, Austria-Hungary
- Died: July 21, 1961 (aged 88) Zagreb, SR Croatia, Yugoslavia
- Education: Augustineum

Svetozar Rittig (6 April 1873 – 21 July 1961) was a Croatian Catholic priest, historian and politician.

== Early life and education ==
Svetozar Rittig was born on 6 April 1873 in Slavonski Brod in a family of German origin. He attended Catholic gymnasium in Travnik after which he studied theology in Sarajevo, Đakovo and Rome. He was ordained in 1895. Rittig obtained a Ph.D. in 1902 from the Augustineum where he was sent in 1898 by bishop Josip Juraj Strossmayer.

== Career ==
After graduation, Rittig at first worked as a teacher of church history at the Đakovo seminary and after 1910 at the Catholic Faculty of Theology of the University of Zagreb. In 1911, he permanently moved to Zagreb where he continued working as a priest and university professor. He was also a secretary to Archbishop Antun Bauer who on 8 January 1912 appointed him editor of the Katolički list, a position he occupied until January 1914. After he stopped teaching in 1915, Rittig was appointed pastor of the Saint Blaise Parish. Between 1917 and 1941, he was a pastor of the Saint Mark Parish. During this period, his house became a gathering place for Croatian intellectuals. With the help of Ivan Meštrović and Jozo Kljaković, he redecorated the St. Mark's Church. For his service, Rittig was named papal chamberlain and abbot of St. Helene of Podbor. After Old Church Slavonic Academy was by his efforts united in 1928 with the Zagreb Croatian Theological Academy as its department, Rittig became the head of the department, and in 1948 the head of the whole Academy (then Institute) which was renamed after him.

== Political career ==
Svetozar Rittig was as a supporter of Strossmayer's liberal politics. He advocated the unification of South Slavs on the federalist principles. He was elected to the Croatian Parliament at the 1908 election as a member of the Croatian Party of Rights, representing Đakovo district. In 1917, he traveled to Switzerland, establishing a connection between the Croatian Parliament and the Yugoslav Committee. In 1918, he served as a member of the National Council of the State of Slovenes, Croats and Serbs, and in 1919-20 a member of the Provisional People's Representation. In 1919, on behalf of Catholic bishops of the Kingdom of Serbs, Croats and Slovenes, he drafted a memorandum seeking recognition of the new state by the Holy See and personally handed it to Pope Benedict XV. Rittig was also a member of the Zagreb Assembly between 1917 and 1932. After the proclamation of the 6 January Dictatorship in 1929, Rittig agreed with Mile Budak and Ante Pavelić to work to undermine Yugoslavia, but ultimately decided to promote a policy of Croatian-Serbian reconciliation through a compromise with King Alexandar. His cooperation with the King, who at one point even decorated him, was not viewed favorably in Croatia. At a session of the Zagreb Assembly held on November 28, 1929, Rittig delivered a speech in which he strongly criticized Pavelić, who, according to him, worked in the service of Italian and Hungarian interests. Following the assassination of King Alexander in 1934, Rittig, alongside forty other dignitaries, signed a memorandum for the regulation of the interior affairs in the Kingdom of Yugoslavia, addressed to regent Prince Paul with the first request being the release of Vladko Maček from prison.

=== During World War II ===
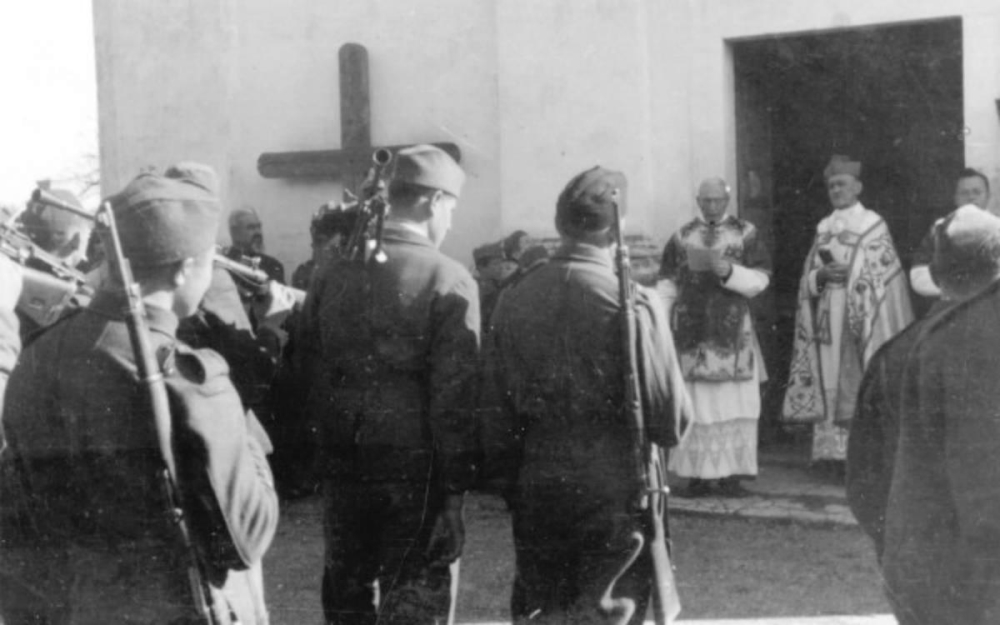
Rittig (priest reading) giving a speech to the Partisans before the celebration of the Holy Mass, 1944

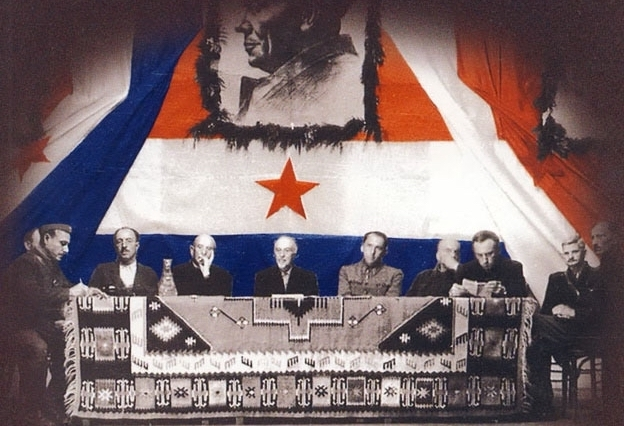
Rittig (first to the left from Vladimir Nazor) as a member of the Executive Board at the 3rd ZAVNOH's session, 1944

In 1939, Rittig gave refuge to the persecuted Poles, Czechs and Jews and actively participated in the work of the Committee for War Refugees founded by Archbishop Aloysius Stepinac. On 30 June 1941, he fled Zagreb after the establishment of the Independent State of Croatia (NDH), when he found out he was to be arrested as the enemy of the regime. At first he lived in Novi Vinodolski and afterwards in Selce. After the 1943 capitulation of Italy, he joined Yugoslav Partisans where he actively cooperated with Andrija Hebrang and Ivan Ribar. In May 1944, he became a councilor of ZAVNOH, and at the ZAVNOH's third session a member of its presidency. Due to his involvement with the partisans, the NDH government repeatedly demanded from Archbishop Stepinac to defrock him, which Stepinac refused to do. Rittig wrongly believed that the partisan movement and the Communist Party were not intertwined.

=== After World War II ===
Between 1944 and 1954, Rittig served as a chairman of the Religious Affairs Commission of the People's Republic of Croatia which was founded by his efforts on 25 August 1944 at the ZAVNOH's third session. He was a member of the Yugoslav delegation at the 1946 Paris Peace Conference. On 26 February 1946, he was appointed minister without portfolio in the Croatian Government. Rittig unsuccessfully urged the Yugoslav federal government to regulate its relations with the Catholic Church for the sake of peace and interethnic unity. In addition, he advocated amnesty for the war prisoners and personally helped many priests and others to be released from detention camps. Rittig pointed out that the vast majority of the Catholic bishops accepted the new government, but that they were confused and distrustful because it unlawfully interfered with religious freedom.

During the trial of Archbishop Stepinac, Rittig's letter from 1942, in which he praised Stepinac for his "hard work and martyrdom, sacrifice to the whole nation and the clergy, and charitable assistance to the Polish refugees and the hungry orphans" was read. In another letter written to the vice president of the Czechoslovak government, he wrote that "Archbishop Stepinac is not guilty", but still, as a staunch supporter of Slavic unity, defended the Yugoslav government despite acknowledging that "the Croatian priesthood is going through the most difficult time in its life and in the history of its Church." Rittig heavily criticized capitalism.

During his term as a member of the Yugoslav Constitutional Assembly, Federal Assembly, and the Croatian Parliament he advocated the separation of church and state, but also greater rights for the Catholic Church and recognition of church marriages, but his proposals were rejected.

Rittig retired in 1954. He died on 21 July 1961 in a villa on Nazorova Street that would later be bought by the first Croatian president Franjo Tuđman.

== Notable works ==
Rittig mostly wrote on the history of the Catholic Church in Croatia, Glagolitic script, liturgy and culture.

- Povijest i pravo slovenštine u crkvenom bogoslužju, sa osobitim obzirom na Hrvatsku [Slavic History and Law In Church Liturgy With Particular Reference to Croatia], 1910
- Martirologij srijemsko-panonske metropolije [Martyrology of the Sirmium-Pannonian Metropolis], 1911
- Glagoljica u našim krajevima od XIII. do XV. vijeka [Glagolitic Script In Our Lands From XIII. to XV. Century], 1923
