= List of Glagolitic manuscripts (1900–present) =

This is a list of manuscripts written in the Glagolitic script from the 20th century to the present.

== List ==
Light red represents manuscripts with Glagolitic only in inclusions or paratext.
Pale red represents mixed manuscripts with Glagolitic as a main script.

Type	Abbreviation	Date	Designation	Library	Place of origin	Folia	Dimensions	Columns and rows	Notes	Scans
dictionary		1900s (beginning)	br. 51 a	Krk (arhiv samostana trećoredaca)	Prague	160			Latinsko-staroslavenski rječnik J. Vajsa. Latinic with Cyrillic and Glagolitic. The book it was copied from was brought from Prague. Scribe not given but matches writing of Josip Vajs who was in Krk 1902–1906 and spent time with fra Ljudevit Brusić who owned the manuscript. Vajs could not remember what the manuscript was written for when asked in 1958.	
Roman Martyrology		1910 (August 3)	R 6215	NSK	Zadar	1 (Gl.)	33.2 × 22.8 cm	1 co	Mučenikoslovlje rimskoje. In Latinic but with Glagolitic introduction. By Ćiril Studenčić. Not a regular manuscript but a copy made by cyclostyle in Zadar (50 copies originally). Originally from a Slavic translation written 1889 in Krk town by Ćiril Studenčić and Ljudevit Brusić, sent to Dragutin Parčić in Rome. Parčić translated some of the months. One in Zagreb as R 6215, one in Glavotok Franciscan Monastery. According to Štefanić it was never sung.	NSK
miscellany		1930 (about)	VII 69	Arhiv HAZU		468	20.7 × 16 cm		Premuda's copy of the Klimantović miscellany (Premudin prijepis Klimantovićeva zbornika). Scribe: Vinko Premuda. Latinic with Glagolitic initials and many Glagolitic numbers. Acquired by Arhiv JAZU in 1948.	
		1975 (October 20)	Karlobaška riznica glagoljice collection	Karlobag (Capuchin Monastery)	Karlobag				Vь ime otca, i sina, i duha svetago. Scribe: Ilija Borak. Same as Bašćanska ploča transcription?	
letter		1980		Vatican	Zagreb	8	29.7 × 21 cm	2 co 28 ro	Egregiae virtutis. Latin with Glagolitic transcription of F. V. Mareš translation of Latin text of the letter of pope John Paul II. Scribe: Marija Pantelić. Presented to the same pope. Microfilm and photocopies made 1981.	IzSt (2008)
		1985	Ms 27	Knjižnica Staroslavenskog instituta		14 p			Večernja. Sung 19 October 1985 in the Crkva sv. Lucije. Scribe: Tome Lesica.	
vita		1986	Ms 29	Knjižnica Staroslavenskog instituta		83 p			Žitje sv. Metodija. Written in Glagolitic, Cyrillic and Latinic. Scribe: Stjepan Štefić.	
		1900s	Karlobaška riznica glagoljice collection	Karlobag (Capuchin Monastery)	Karlobag				Bašćanska ploča transcription. Scribe: Ilija Borak.	
letter		1900s	Karlobaška riznica glagoljice collection	Karlobag (Capuchin Monastery)	Karlobag	1			Letter of Ilija Borak. Scribe: fra Ilija Borak (Radovec 1914 – Rijeka 2010).	NSK
		1900s	Karlobaška riznica glagoljice collection	Karlobag (Capuchin Monastery)	Karlobag				Familia, ex qua progentius sum. Scribe: Ilija Borak. Glagolitic?	
		1900s	Karlobaška riznica glagoljice collection	Karlobag (Capuchin Monastery)	Karlobag				Lûbi i zloba človečskaê do nine dovedoša me tkmo. Scribe: Ilija Borak.	
		1900s	Karlobaška riznica glagoljice collection	Karlobag (Capuchin Monastery)	Karlobag				Adresar. Scribe: Ilija Borak. Glagolitic?	
psalter		1998		private library		132	22.5 × 16 cm	2 co	Forgery sold 3 June 1998 at Christie's for GBP 53,200. In 2000 a microfilm of it was made at the Bodleian (one copy M 277 at the Staroslavenski institut).	
abecedary		2000s	Karlobaška riznica glagoljice collection	Karlobag (Capuchin Monastery)	Karlobag				Abecedary of Ilija Borak. Scribe: Ilija Borak.	
