= Krivodol =

Krivodol may refer to:

- Krivodol, Bulgaria, a town near Vratsa
- Krivodol Glacier, a glacier on Antarctica
- Krivodol, Podbablje, a village in the Podbablje municipality, Split-Dalmatia County, Croatia
- Krivodol, Trilj, a village near Trilj, Split-Dalmatia County, Croatia
