= List of undated Glagolitic manuscripts =

This is a list of manuscripts written in the Glagolitic script whose dates are unknown.

== List ==
Light red represents manuscripts with Glagolitic only in inclusions or paratext.
Pale red represents mixed manuscripts with Glagolitic as a main script.

Type	Abbreviation	Designation	Library	Place of origin	Folia	Dimensions	Columns and rows	Notes	Scans
homiliary		Ms 2051	NUK		2			Third Ljubljana homiliary (Treći ljubljanski homilijar). Parchment.	DSK
homily	Fg(Hom)Nat	Glagolitica I-15	Croatian State Archives	Croatia	2	14.5 x 20.2 cm		Fragment of Christmas Homily (Fragment božićne propovijedi). Donated to HDA by Branko Kusar of Rijeka in 1962. Microfilm made April 1985 in Zagreb.	IzSt (2008)
land register			Samostan sv. Mihovila na Zaglavu	Zaglav	28 p	27.5 x 9.7 cm		Knjiga posjeda i kolona samostana sv. Mihovila na Zaglavu. Glagolitic to page 13.	
notes			Vrgada (sakristija)	Vrgada				Empty pages of the Vrgada copy of the 1688 breviary were used to practice writing Glagolitic and Italian. A Latin note mentions don Ivan Vulin of Pakoštane as the owner in 1775.	
		Glagolitica I-18	HDA	Croatia	7	14.5 x 19.5 cm		Fragmenti Antonina? Donated to HDA by Branko Kursar in 1962. Microfilm of Star. inst. created April 1985.	IzSt (2008)
			Vrgada (župni ured)			I 3.5 x 2.6 cm, II 3.3 x 2.5 cm, III 3 x 2.5 cm, IV 2.8 x 2.4 cn		Vrgada strips (Vrgadski ostrišci). 4 strips. Formerly attached to the cover of a printed prayer book.	
								GUZ	
		inv. br. 49	Ljubljana (Narodna in univerzitetska knjižnica)					In the remains of Štefan Kocijančić, there is a Glagolitic transcription of a fragment he found on the cover of III a 36 that has been lost and is not the same as the negative print that survives on it.	
			Rijeka (Capuchin Monastery)					Used as cover of a dictionary with sign. X-15. First described by Benčić in 1998.	
			Rijeka (Capuchin Monastery)					Used as cover of a dictionary with sign. X-16 housed at the Capuchin Monastery in Rijeka. First described by Benčić in 1998.	
			Škofja Loka (Capuchin Monastery)					A Latin psalter-breviary from 1686 with 14 Glagolitic parchment pages from various codices inserted during its repair at some time: 18, 30, 118, 126, 162, 195, 203, 205, 210, 216, 230, 232, 258, 271	
		FgCapVla collection	Karlobag (Capuchin Monastery)					Nekoliko glagoljskih ostrižaka. Found inside of a 1686 Psalterium Romanum.	
	? (FgCap VlaAuc)	FgCapVla collection	Karlobag (Capuchin Monastery)		1			Found on cover of Latin book Augustissime Caesar dated 1642.	
annerversaries		1600s-1700s	Arhiv Zadarske nadbiskupije	Grusi (Briševo)	12 p	22 x 15.5 cm		Glagolitic with just a few Latinic words.	
		F III. 84	Arhiv HAZU	Baška	7			Neki zbornik manjeg formata. Photographs are kept as F 301 in the Staroslavenski institut.	
		Berčićevo sobranje fragmenata I, 105 (172), 106 (173), 107 (174), 108 (175)	Petersburg (гос. публ. библиотека)		2			Komad dvolista. Acquired by Berčić in Kukljica on 18 June 1863. Probable duplicate entry.	
souls		Spisi Ninske biskupije, kutija 5, br. 16	Arhiv Zadarske nadbiskupije	Zaton					
souls		Spisi Ninske biskupije, kutija 5, br. 18	Arhiv Zadarske nadbiskupije	Poljica	1				
souls		Spisi Ninske biskupije, kutija 5, br. 19	Arhiv Zadarske nadbiskupije					Scribe: don Ive Jurišić. According to Pavao Kero, Ive Jurišić was born in Neviđane on Pašman and was župnik in Vrsi 1727–1729. But an Ive Jurišić was also mentioned in Privlaka in 1683.	
souls		Spisi Ninske biskupije, kutija 5, br. 20	Arhiv Zadarske nadbiskupije	Vir	1				
souls		Spisi Ninske biskupije, kutija 5, br. 26	Arhiv Zadarske nadbiskupije	Islam Latinski					
souls		Spisi Ninske biskupije, kutija 5, br. 30/31	Arhiv Zadarske nadbiskupije	Nadin	2				
souls		Spisi Ninske biskupije, kutija 5, br. 32	Arhiv Zadarske nadbiskupije	Poličnik					
souls		Spisi Ninske biskupije, kutija 5, br. 38	Arhiv Zadarske nadbiskupije		1			"Rupal ma/n/li".	
souls		Spisi Ninske biskupije, kutija 5, br. 24	Arhiv Zadarske nadbiskupije	Dračevac, Visočane	1			Scribe: don Martin Sikirić parish priest of Dračevac and Visočane. Same time period as kutija 5, br. 17.	
souls		Spisi Ninske biskupije, kutija 5, br. 45	Arhiv Zadarske nadbiskupije	Vir	1			Scribe: don Mikula Žintiličić parish priest of Vir. Multiple priests named Mikula Žintiličić are named, both originally from Molat, but the one who was mentioned as parish priest of Vir in 1702 was still a deacon in 1692, mentioned as a priest from 1698 until his death on 16 April 1716 at age of 50.	
souls		Spisi Ninske biskupije, kutija 5, br. 47	Arhiv Zadarske nadbiskupije	Vrsi	1			Scribe: don Marko Marčević parish priest of Vrsi. He was born in Molat and was a witness at a wedding there in 1688. He was a member of the Bratovština Duha Svetoga in Božava in 1712, then parish priest of Dragove 1718–1719. He died in Božava as its parish priest 3 October 1720 aged 66 and was buried on Molat.	
		Spisi Ninske biskupije, kutija 5, br. 25	Arhiv Zadarske nadbiskupije	Bokanjac	1			Letter of don Jerolim Šangulin parish priest of Bokanjac to the kurat of Nin. With Italian following.	
		Spisi Ninske biskupije, kutija 5, br. 27	Arhiv Zadarske nadbiskupije	Islam Latinski				Letter of don Grgo Burmeta to the bishop of Nin. With Italian following.	
		Spisi Ninske biskupije, kutija 5, br. 46	Arhiv Zadarske nadbiskupije	Vir?	1			Letter of Pave Benić to the bishop of Nin.	
		Spisi Ninske biskupije, kutija 5, br. 39	Arhiv Zadarske nadbiskupije	Slivnica				Scribe: parok Tome Sikirić. A Tome Sikirić was born in Sutomišćica nad served as župnik as Nadin and Raštević with Škabrnja 1758–1779, but the same priest or a different one was active in Vrsi in 1757, 1760 and 1764 (though in 1764 as the parochian of Slivnica), and another document mentions a Tome Sikirić parish priest of Korlat, and another Tome Sikirić acquired a missal in 1780 in Sutomišćica (who was still alive in 1810).	
		Spisi Ninske biskupije, kutija 5, br. 40	Arhiv Zadarske nadbiskupije	Smilčić	1			Letter to don Petar Kolijon in Nin.	
		Spisi Ninske biskupije, kutija 5, br. 44	Arhiv Zadarske nadbiskupije		1			Testament of baba Mare Budijevića from Vir on matters of marriage in Privlaka and Nin. Glagolitic with Italian.	
		Spisi Ninske biskupije, kutija 5, br. 43	Arhiv Zadarske nadbiskupije	Tribanj	1			Letter of Jure Rukavina parish priest of Tribanj to don Šime Ijukić parish priest of Radovin. Born in Sveti Filip i Jakov, ordained 20 October 1755, parish priest by 1760 in Radovin, last christening in 1763.	
		Spisi Ninske biskupije, kutija 5, br. 42	Arhiv Zadarske nadbiskupije	Tribanj	1			Testament of Frane Jović regarding the service of Mate Jović. Italian and Glagolitic.	
		Spisi Ninske biskupije, kutija 5, br. 41	Arhiv Zadarske nadbiskupije	Suhovare	1			Letter of don Grgo Burmetić (Burmeta) of Suhovare to the bishop of Nin. At one point a priest by that name was parish priest in Islam Latinski, as well as on 10 November 1728 as parish priest of Suhovare. Kero notes a Grgo Burmetić born in Neviđane who was parish priest of Neviđane 1681–1694, though in 1681 he was only a chaplain.	
		Spisi Ninske biskupije, kutija 5, br. 34	Arhiv Zadarske nadbiskupije		1			Letter of don Frane Jović and others to the bishop of Nin regarding the desetina in Radovin, Ljubalj and Ražanac. With Italian translation. There were multiple priests by the name Frane Jović in Ražanac, mentioned from 1674 to 1753.	
		Spisi Ninske biskupije, kutija 5, br. 35	Arhiv Zadarske nadbiskupije	Ražanac?	1			Letter of don Stipan Ugarković to the bishop of Nin. Stipan Ugarković was a member of the Skula Duha Svetoga in Dračevac in 1691, then mentioned in Ražanac in 1699.	
		Spisi Ninske biskupije, kutija 5, br. 36	Arhiv Zadarske nadbiskupije	Ražanac	1			Letter of don Mate Ugaraković of Ražanac to the bishop of Nin. With Italian addition. Mate Ugarković was born in Ražanac. He was a member of the Skula Duha Svetoga in Dračevac in 1691. He was mentioned in several documents from 1682 to 1714, but was only a subdeacon in 1682 so this letter must have been written at a later time.	
		Spisi Ninske biskupije, kutija 5, br. 37	Arhiv Zadarske nadbiskupije	Ražanac				Scribe: don Frane Jović of Ražanac. See kutija 5, br. 22.	
		Spisi Ninske biskupije, kutija 5, br. 28/29	Arhiv Zadarske nadbiskupije	Nadin	2			Letter of priest Marko Kadia in Nadin to the bishop of Nin.	
		Spisi Ninske biskupije, kutija 5, br. 21	Arhiv Zadarske nadbiskupije	Bibinje	1			Letter of don Grgo Peričić parish priest of Bibinj to parish priest don Mate. According to Kero, he was born in Sukošan, and was župnik in Bibinje 1679. Later, he gave the last rites to sick parishioners in Sukošan in 1694 and 1710. He died 15 March 1715.	
		Spisi Ninske biskupije, kutija 5, br. 22	Arhiv Zadarske nadbiskupije	Ražanac	1			Letter of don Frane Jović parish priest of Ražanac to the bishop of Nin.	
		Spisi Ninske biskupije, kutija 5, br. 23	Arhiv Zadarske nadbiskupije	Bibinje, Privlaka?				Letter to don Mate from the parish priest of Bibinje with reply from Luca son of Girolamo Carsulouich of Privlaka.	
		Spisi Ninske biskupije, kutija 5, br. 17	Arhiv Zadarske nadbiskupije	Dračevac or Visočane	1			Letter of don Martin Sikirić to the bishop of Nin. Martin Sikirić was born in Sutomišćica. He was župnik of Dračevac and Visočane but none of his documents are dated.	
		Spisi Ninske biskupije, kutija 5, br. 5	Arhiv Zadarske nadbiskupije	Privlaka	1			Letter of don Mate parish priest of Privlaka to the bishop of Nin.	
		Spisi Ninske biskupije, kutija 5, br. 7	Arhiv Zadarske nadbiskupije	Tribanj				Letter of don Jure Rukavina parish priest of Tribanj.	
		Spisi Ninske biskupije, kutija 5, br. 6	Arhiv Zadarske nadbiskupije	Tribanj	1			Letter of don Jure Rukavina parish priest of Tribanj.	
		Spisi Ninske biskupije, kutija 5, br. 9	Arhiv Zadarske nadbiskupije					Letter to the bishop and vicar and parish priest don Pere.	
		Spisi Ninske biskupije, kutija 5, br. 12	Arhiv Zadarske nadbiskupije		1			Letter of don Pavle Benić. Don Pave Benić was born in Kukljica on Ugljan. He was župnik in 1730 and kapelan in Kukljica 1747 until he was made župnik there in 1754. He continued as župnik until about 1758. His year of death is unknown.	
		Spisi Ninske biskupije, kutija 5, br. 13	Arhiv Zadarske nadbiskupije	Vlašići	1			Letter of don Jure Čemelić parish priest of Vlašići. Čemelić was born in Kolan on Pag. He died as parish priest of Novalja (year not stated in source).	
		Spisi Ninske biskupije, kutija 5, br. 13	Arhiv Zadarske nadbiskupije	Vlašići	1			Letter of don Dunat Šegota parish priest of Vlašići to don Mati Ugarković vicar and parish priest of Ražanac.	
		Spisi Ninske biskupije, kutija 5, br. 15	Arhiv Zadarske nadbiskupije	Vrsi	1			Scribe: don Šime parish priest of Vrsi.	
		Spisi Ninske biskupije, kutija 5, br. 48	Arhiv Zadarske nadbiskupije	Zaton?	1			Letter of pop Šimun Gerković parish priest to the bishop of Nin. A Šimun Gerković was mentioned in Zaton in March 1712 in kut. 2, br. 25/26, and was not necessarily the same as the Šime Gerković who was parish priest in Petrčane 1764–1767. In the box with br. 48, the following letter was written in Zaton, making this letter most likely to have come from the earlier priest in Zaton.	
		Spisi Ninske biskupije, kutija 5, br. 49	Arhiv Zadarske nadbiskupije	Zaton	1			Testament of Jivan Piculić parish priest of Zaton regarding Ivan son of Petar Buldunić. See kutija 2, br. 42 for a mention of Jivan Piculić in 1725 as parish priest of Zaton. Piculić was born in Olib around 1692, and served as parish priest in Olib 1724–1738. There may have been more than one by that name or Piculić may have been responsible for both parishes at the time.	
		Spisi Ninske biskupije, kutija 5, br. 50	Arhiv Zadarske nadbiskupije		1			Short or unfinished letter.	
		Spisi Ninske biskupije, kutija 5, br. 51	Arhiv Zadarske nadbiskupije	Privlaka	1			Italian with Glagolitic confirmation and signature of don Matij parish priest of Privlaka.	
		Spisi Ninske biskupije, kutija 5, br. 52	Arhiv Zadarske nadbiskupije	?	1			Letter of 10 deacons to the bishop of Nin. All but one wrote in Latinic, but don Šime Španić of Molat wrote in Glagolitic. Location unknown, with mixed provenance of writers.	
		Spisi Ninske biskupije, kutija 5, br. 53	Arhiv Zadarske nadbiskupije	Nin	1			Decrees of the see of Nin in the time of Martin Dragolović (r. 1703–1708 beginning 16 July).	
		Spisi Ninske biskupije, kutija 5, br. 54	Arhiv Zadarske nadbiskupije	Nin	1			Decrees of the see of Nin in the time of Martin Dragolović (r. 1703–1708 beginning 16 July).	
		Spisi Ninske biskupije, kutija 5 (džepić), br. 1a	Arhiv Zadarske nadbiskupije	Nin	1			Decrees of Martin Dragolio (Dragolić) bishop of Nin.	
		Spisi Ninske biskupije, kutija 5 (džepić), br. 2a	Arhiv Zadarske nadbiskupije	Nin	1			Decrees of archdeacon Petar Paolo Pakašin for the see of Nin.	
		Spisi Ninske biskupije, kutija 5, br. 55	Arhiv Zadarske nadbiskupije	Nadin	1			Letter of pop Marko Kadia in Nadin to the bishop of Nin. Marko Kadia was born in Turanj and was parish priest first in Smilčić as late as 1741, but became parish priest of Nadin and Korlat likely until his death (either 1757 or 1762 depending on the source).	
		Spisi Ninske biskupije, kutija 5, br. 56	Arhiv Zadarske nadbiskupije	Nadin	1			Letter of pop Marko Kadia in Nadin to the bishop of Nin regarding Paval son of Marko Vrsajko and Božica daughter of Jerko Vučkulić. See kutija 5, br. 55.	
		Spisi Ninske biskupije, kutija 5, br. 57	Arhiv Zadarske nadbiskupije	Korlat	1			Testament of parish priest Tome Sikirić. See kutija 5, br. 39.	
		Spisi Ninske biskupije, kutija 5, br.	Arhiv Zadarske nadbiskupije						
		Spisi Ninske biskupije, kutija 5, br. 10	Arhiv Zadarske nadbiskupije	Vir	1			Letter of don Marko Perić parish priest of Vir to the parish priest of Tkon. Perić was moved from Zaton presumably to Vir on 4 March 1700. Perić died by 15 October 1725 when he is mentioned as deceased.	
		Spisi Ninske biskupije, kutija 5, br. 11	Arhiv Zadarske nadbiskupije	Vir	1			Letter of don Marko Perić parish priest of Vir. Same general time period as kutija 5, br. 10.	
		Spisi Ninske biskupije, kutija 5, br. 8	Arhiv Zadarske nadbiskupije	Vinjerac	1			Letter of don Šime Dadić of Visočane to the parish priest of Škabrnja. Dadić was parish priest in Visočane from 1742/1744 until his death on 7 February 1784.	
christening		Spisi Ninske biskupije, kutija 5, br. 4	Arhiv Zadarske nadbiskupije	Novigrad	1			Scribe: don Vicko Ivčić parish priest of Novigrad. Vicko Ivčić was the parish priest of Novigrad 1663–1685, dying 18 September 1685.	
		Spisi Ninske biskupije, kutija 5, br. 3	Arhiv Zadarske nadbiskupije					Letter to don Lovre Žujić.	
		Spisi Ninske biskupije, kutija 5, br. 1	Arhiv Zadarske nadbiskupije	Ražanac	1			Letter informing the people of Ražanac, Biljane and Popovići that pope Innocent XII (r. 1691–1700) gave absolution of all sins to all making pilgrimage to the Crkva Blažene Gospe od Maslina outside the city of Zadar (no longer outside the city).	
		Spisi Ninske biskupije, kutija 5, br. 2	Arhiv Zadarske nadbiskupije	Zadar	1			Letter from Vitorij Priul archbishop of Zadar informing that pope Innocent XII (r. 1691–1700) gave absolution of all sins to all making pilgrimage to the Crkva Blažene Gospe od Malsina outside the city of Zadar. Dated to same time as kutija 5, br. 1.	
will		I br. 26	Šibenik (Gradski muzej)	Prvić				Poručastvo za meštra Vicu Drobnjaka. Scribe: fra Mati Šlakić, who wrote many other surviving wills.	
inventory		II br. 238	Šibenik (Gradski muzej)	Murter				Inventory of Kate Šćavuna. Scribe: unknown.	
homiliary			Arhiv Zadarske nadbiskupije	Vrsi	18	32 x 22 cm	Dio glagoljske knjige propovijedi. Scribe was likely a parish priest of Vrsi.		
catechism			Split (Sveučilišna knjižnica)	Žman	12 p	21.6 x 15 cm		Poučavanje o vjeri – pitanja i odgovori. Glagolitic with Latinic pages 5–11.	
catechism			Split (Sveučilišna knjižnica)	Žman	12 p	19.8 x 14.3 cm		Ženidbene zapreke – pitanja i odgovori. Glagolitic with Latinic on pages 11 and 12.	
homily				Split (Sveučilišna knjižnica)	Žman	2	21.7 x 14.7 cm	Propovijed u prigodi vjenčanja – bilješke.	
homiliary			Split (Sveučilišna knjižnica)	Žman	1	28.5 x 19.8 cm		Isječak iz Knjige propovijedi.	
miscellany			Split (Sveučilišna knjižnica)	Žman	8 p	20.3 x 14.5 cm		Iz Zbornika.	
miscellany			Split (Sveučilišna knjižnica)	Žman	4 p	29 x 19.5 cm		Iz Zbornika.	
miscellany			Split (Sveučilišna knjižnica)	Žman	9 p	29 x 19.5 cm		Iz Zbornika. Glagolitic with some Latinic. Scribes: župnik don Ive Radinić of Žman, don Matij Civelin.	
breviary		OR 1	Knjižnica Staroslavenskog instituta		2			Dvolist glagoljskog brevijara.	
		OR 3	Knjižnica Staroslavenskog instituta		1			Glagoljski fragment iz "Libera" iz Poljica.Formerly in the library of don Grga Topić of Kučice (near Omiš).	
prayer book						10 x 13.5 cm		Hrvatski glagoljski molitvenik iz ostavštine J. Gusića. Photocopy F 474 of the Staroslavenski institut, created in the HDA on 15 October 2003. Manuscript not yet identified.	
