= Sveti Vid =

Sveti Vid (lit. 'Saint Vitus') may refer to several places in Slovenia:

- Šentvid pri Planini, a settlement in the Municipality of Šentjur, known as Sveti Vid pri Planini until 1955
- Šentvid pri Zavodnju, a settlement in the Municipality of Šoštanj, known as Sveti Vid pri Zavodnju until 1955
- Sveti Vid, Cerknica, a settlement in the Municipality of Cerknica
- Sveti Vid, Vuzenica, a settlement in the Municipality of Vuzenica
- Sveti Vid Dobrinjski, a settlement on the island of Krk, Croatia
- Vidovica, a settlement in the Municipality of Podčetrtek, known as Sveti Vid until 1955
