= List of Glagolitic manuscripts (1800–1899) =

This is a list of manuscripts written in the Glagolitic script in the 19th century.

== List ==
Light red represents manuscripts with Glagolitic only in inclusions or paratext.
Pale red represents mixed manuscripts with Glagolitic as a main script.

| Type | Abbreviation | Date | Designation | Library | Place of origin | Folia | Dimensions | Columns and rows | Notes | Scans |
|---|---|---|---|---|---|---|---|---|---|---|
| note | | 1800 | | Vrgada (sakristija) | Vrgada | | | | Glagolitic note by Marko Hrastin in the 2nd copy of the 1640 Ritual on Vrgada. | |
| ledger | | 1800–1862 | | Brbinj (župni ured) | Brbinj | 192 p | 28.1 x 19.5 cm | | Kvateran crikve s. Kuzme i Damijana. Glagolitic to 1815 inclusive then Latinic, with Italian in 1836 and 1837. | |
| | | 1801–1818 | br. 16 | Vrbnik (župni ured) | Vrbnik | 150 | 31.5 x 22.5 cm | | Kapitulska knjiga instrumenata. Glagolitic and Italian. | |
| | | 1801 | Arhiv obitelji Garanjin-Fanfonja, Glagolitika | Državni arhiv u Splitu | Veli Iž | 15 | 19 x 13.5 cm | | Štima od maslina. | |
| matricula | | 1802 – after 1957 | | Arhiv Zadarske nadbiskupije | Olib | 182 | 31 x 22.2 cm | | Madrikula Bratovštine sv. Petra i Pavla. Begins with an 1802 transcription of a previous codex that began in 1727. Glagolitic to 1818 then Latinic. One of the last manuscripts with Glagolitic to be in use for records. | |
| marriages | | 1803–1812, 1821–1837 | br. 1039 | DaZd | Sestrunj | 36 p | 26.7 x 9.1 cm | | Glagolitic to 1810 inclusive then Latinic. | DaZd, FS |
| | | 1803 | inv. br. 12 | Poljica (župni ured) | Poljica | 20 | 29 x 11 cm | | Polica vječnih obaveza poljičkog klera. Completely Glagolitic except for some notes on first folio. | |
| receipts and expenditures | | 1803–1814 | inv. br. 17 | Bogovići (župni ured) | Dubašnica | 66 | 31.2 x 21.5 cm | | Kapitulska knjiga: primici i izdaci. Completely Glagolitic with one Italian note 1803. | |
| receipts and expenditures | | 1803–1814 | | Bogovići, Krk | Dubašnica, Krk | | | | | |
| receipts and expenditures | | 1804–1840 | | Monastery of Saint Mary Magdalene in Porat, Krk | Dubašnica, Krk | 280 | 30.8 x 21.6 cm | | Blagajnička knjiga primitaka i izdataka. Completely Glagolitic. Last entry end of November 1840. | |
| masses served | | 1804–1809 | Arhiv obitelji Garanjin-Fanfonja, glagolitika | Državni arhiv u Splitu | Zadar | 30 | 29 x 10 cm | | Popis služenih misa. | |
| deaths | | 1805–1812, 1821–1837 | br. 1041 | DaZd | Sestrunj | 52 p | 28.2 x 9.9 cm | | Glagolitic to 1812, no deaths 1813–1820, Latinic from 1821. | DaZd |
| ledger | | 1805–1810 | Registro nuovo | Dobrinj (župni ured) | Dobrinj | 116 | 30.5 x 22 cm | | Kapitulska knjiga: godišnji računi. Italian with Glagolitic f. 96. | |
| christenings | | 1806–1815 | IX 29 | Arhiv HAZU | Omišalj | 134 | 34.5 x 21 cm | | Glagolitic to 1812 then Latinic. | FS |
| christening | | 1807 | IV a 80/53 | Arhiv HAZU | Tribanj (Novigrad) | 1 | 27 x 9.5 cm | | Zapisi krštenja. Begins 1 June 1807. Glagolitic and Latinic. Scribe: parish priest don Mate Gačić. | |
| | | 1807 | Arhiv obitelji Garanjin-Fanfonja, Glagolitika | Državni arhiv u Splitu | Zverinac | 6 | 28 x 19.5 cm | | Nota od pohištva Fanfoničovih. Scribe: Pave Pavin. | |
| | | 1807 | Arhiv obitelji Garanjin-Fanfonja, Glagolitika | Državni arhiv u Splitu | Veli Iž | 8 | 28 x 9.5 cm | | Štima od trsov Fanfunićev u Ižu Velikom od štimadura Blasula Mičića od Sutomišćice. | |
| | | 1808–1821 | | Galevac (Samostan sv. Pavla) | Galevac | 37 p | 34.1 x 11.7 cm | | Knjiga zadušnica za pok. Bartola da Milano. Completely Glagolitic. | |
| homily | | 1808 | IV a 50/8 | Arhiv HAZU | | 4+1 | 19.7 x 14 cm | | Odlomci dviju propovijedi. | |
| | | 1808, 1810, 1812 | Arhiv obitelji Garanjin-Fanfonja, Glagolitika | Državni arhiv u Splitu | Veli Iž | 10 | 36.7 x 11.2 cm | | Nota od štime trsja i grozja u Ižu Velikome. Scribe: štimadur Jere Masar of Lukoran. | |
| legal | | 1809 | | Kukljica (Ljubo Martinović Lonićev library) | | | | | Scribe: don Lovre Peštić of Lukoran, parish priest of Kukljica. | |
| | | 1809 | Garanjin-Fanfonja fond, Glagolitika | Državni arhiv u Splitu | Veli Iž | 4 | 35.2 x 23.7 cm | | Nota od maslin Fanfonićevih u Ižu Velikomu. | |
| | | 1809 | Garanjin-Fanfonja fond, Glagolitika | Državni arhiv u Splitu | Veli Iž | 4 | 33.4 x 23.7 cm | | Nota od štime od trsjev i grozja Fanfonićeva u Ižu Velomu. Scribe: štimadur Ante Košte od Preka. | |
| inventory | | 1809, 1810 | Garanjin-Fanfonja fond, Glagolitika | Državni arhiv u Splitu | Bibinje | 40 | | | Štima od maslin Sv. Marije u Bibinjama, 1809. i 1810. | |
| inventory | | 1809, 1810 | Garanjin-Fanfonja fond, Glagolitika | Državni arhiv u Splitu | Pašman, Ugljan, Poljana. | 6 | 35.3 x 23.6 cm | | Note od štime od maslin u Pašmanu i Ugljanu i Poljani od štimadura Jere Masara od Lukorana. Scribe: Jere Masar of Lukoran. Begins 20 October 1808. | |
| inventory | | 1810, 1811, 1812 | Garanjin-Fanfonja fond, Glagolitika | Državni arhiv u Splitu | Dobropoljana | 5 | 36.7 x 23 cm | | Note od maslin u Poljani, Banju, Ugljanu. Begins 15 October 1810. | |
| | | 1809, 1811, 1812 | Garanjin-Fanfonja fond, Glagolitika | Državni arhiv u Splitu | Veli Iž | 8 | 33.2 x 10.8 cm | | Štime od maslin i od trsjev u Ižu. First entry 17 June 1809 by Jere Masara of Lukoran. Glagolitic with Latinic notes on 1v and 8r. | |
| | | 1810–1812 | Garanjin-Fanfonja fond, Glagolitika | Državni arhiv u Splitu | Veli Iž, Bibinje, Pašman, Gaženica, Mali Iž, Sv. Marija oko grada, Sukošan | 20 | 36.7 x 23.2 cm | | Nota od štime maslin Fanfonićevih. | |
| | | 1810 | IX E 24 | Prague (National Museum) | | 131 | 24.5 x 17.5 cm | | Bukvar Pavla Solarića. Cyrillic with some Glagolitic. Manuscript for the printed book. Scribe: Pavel Solarić. | |
| christenings | | 1810–1828, 1840 | | Diklo (župni ured) | Diklo | 40 p | 22.7 x 10.7 cm | | Glagolitic to 1824 inclusive then Latinic. | |
| notebook | | 1810–1832 | IV a 80/41 | Arhiv HAZU | Sali | 6 | 19 x 12.4 cm | | Komad bilježnice Mate Puhova. Glagolitic with last entry 1832. Scribe: Mate Puhov, with handwriting identical to hand B of IV a 80/17. | |
| annerversaries | | 1810 (about) – 1862 | | Arhiv Zadarske nadbiskupije | Banj | 86 p | 22.3 x 15.4 cm | | Libar godova prepisan oko god. 1810. Glagolitic to 1845, Latinic from 1839 to end. Scribe: parish priest Mate Dunatov and successors. Attached is a 57.5 x 47 cm decree of the Zadar knez Ivan More in Italian with Glagolitic translation. | GL, PB |
| annerversaries | | 1811–1895 | | Arhiv Zadarske nadbiskupije | Bibinje | | 28.6 x 10 cm | | Knjiga godova Bibinje. Glagolitic to 1823 then Latinic. Includes 1811 transcription by parish priest Marko Lovrović of Olib of earlier book. Cover is marriages register from 1714 (otherwise lost). | GUZ, PB |
| | | 1811–1814 | | Zagreb (Sv. Ksaver) | Glavotok | | | | Knjiga primitaka i izdataka 1811–1814. But begins "1711" with note by Anton Bogović "prešident mostira svete Marie od Glavotoka". | |
| | | 1811, 1812 | Arhiv obitelji Garanjin-Fanfonja, glagolitika | Državni arhiv u Splitu | Zadar | 4 | 36.7 x 23.2 cm | | Nota od hrane Sv. Marije oko grada. Begins 5 June 1811. | |
| christenings | | 1812–1844 | br. 1331 | DaZd | Tkon | 112 p | 32 x 11 cm | 1 co | Latinic with Glagolitic for 1816–1819 (pp. 7–18) and 1820 (p. 19, 20–22). Facsimile published 2013. | DaZd |
| deaths | | 1812–1844 | br. 1336 | DaZd | Tkon | 76 p | 31.5 x 11.5 cm | | Latinic with Glagolitic for 1816–1819 (pp. 6–18). | DaZd |
| | | 1812 | VII 48 | Arhiv HAZU | | 17 | 19 x 14.5 cm | | Librić fra Bartula Tomašića. Written by Franciscan monk Bartul Tomašić of Draga Bašćanska while in Krk. Acquired by Milčetić after 1911, loaned to Vinko Premuda. Acquired by JAZU with Premuda library. | |
| | | 1812 | inv. br. 13 | Poljica (župni ured) | Poljica | 30 | 29 x 11 cm | | Polica vječnih obaveza poljičkog klera. Glagolitic with some Italian notes. | |
| marriages, deaths | | 1815- | | Poljica (župni ured) | Poljica | | | | | |
| masses served | | 1815, 1816 | Arhiv obitelji Garanjin-Fanfonja | Državni arhiv u Splitu | Zadar | 4 | 30 x 10.5 cm | | Nota od mis koje je govorio don Mate Šimarina. | |
| ledger | | 1815–1816 | IV a 80/48 | Arhiv HAZU | Tkon | 3 | 28 x 10 cm | | Računi don Pere Pletikose. Scribe: Pere Pletikosa. | |
| | | 1816–1850 | b. 99 | Krk (arhiv samostana trećoredaca) | Krk | 141 | 46 x 15 cm | | Knjiga evidencije zajmova. Completely Glagolitic. | |
| receipts and expenditures | | 1816–1861 | br. 07 | Krk (arhiv samostana trećoredaca) | Krk | 267 | 30.5 x 20.5 cm | | Knjiga primitaka i izdataka. Glagolitic to 1848 then Latinic but last entry in 1861 Glagolitic (with Latinic ductus). | |
| receipts and expenditures | | 1816–1827 | br. 98 | Krk (arhiv samostana trećoredaca) | Krk | 47 | 31.7 x 21.8 cm | | Konceptna knjiga primitaka i izdataka. Completely Glagolitic. | |
| | | 1817–1832 | | Zagreb (arhiv samostana sv. Ksaver) | Dubašnica | 101 | | | Registar odsluženih misa kao obavezanih kapitulskih legata. | |
| matricula | | 1819–1935 | | Arhiv Zadarske nadbiskupije | Kukljica | 157 | 32 x 11 cm | | Marikula Bratovštine Svetog Duha 1819–1935. Latinic except for ff. 1v, 11-13r. | |
| | | 1819, 1820, 1825 | VIII 124 | Arhiv HAZU | Dubašnica | 29+25+36 | 27.5 x 9.5 cm | | "Police od služab" dubašljanskog klera. Mostly Latinic but partially Glagolitic to 1825. | |
| ledger | | 1820–1846 | | Dubašnica (župni ured) | | 126 | | | Kaptolska knjiga 1820.-1846. Discovered in a private home and given to the Župni ured of Dubašnica. A 1986 photocopy (F 244) is housed at the Staroslavenski institut. | |
| facsimile manuscript | | 1820–1826 | R 6637 | NSK | Croatia | 108 | 26.3 x 20 cm | | Codices Slavici Vaticani. Latinic with Glagolitic and Cyrillic facsimiles and transcriptions. By M. Strandman and Mihail Kirillovič Bobrovskij. | NSK, GHR |
| annerversaries and masses | | 1821–1840 | | Monastery of Saint Mary Magdalene in Porat, Krk | Dubašnica, Krk | 106 | 31.5 x 10.5 cm | | Knjiga anniversarija i vječnih misa crkve sv. Marije. For the church of Saint Mary. Completely Glagolitic. | |
| annerversaries | | 1823–1875 | | Galevac (Samostan sv. Pavla) | Galevac | 18 p | 44 x 16.5 cm | | Anniversarij po Reguli 1823–1875. Glagolitic with some Latinic and Italian notes. The year 1863 is completely Glagolitic except for December. | |
| ledger | | 1823–1860 | | Galevac (Samostan sv. Pavla) | Galevac | 187 p | 32.7 x 23.2 cm | | Blagajnički dnevnik 1823–1860. Glagolitic to 1 September 1853 then Italian. | |
| | | 1823–1861 | | Galevac (Samostan sv. Pavla) | Galevac | 16 p | 29.8 x 10.8 cm | | Knjiga intrade Samostana sv. Pavla na Školjiću (Galevac). Glagolitic and Latinic with some Italian notes. | |
| | | 1823 | Glagolitica I-12 | Croatian State Archives | | 6 | 20 x 12.7 cm | | Pismenstvo jezika slovinskago illiriceskago ve drevnih vrimenih. Given by Lene widow Karlić to HDA in 1948. | IzSt (2008) |
| receipts and expenditures | | 1823–1826 | | Zagreb (Sv. Ksaver) | Glavotok | | | | Knjiga primitaka i izdataka 1823–1826. But "1723" written. | |
| debts | | 1823–1841 | | Monastery of Saint Mary Magdalene in Porat, Krk | Dubašnica, Krk | 68 | 34 x 26.3 cm | | Knjiga dužnika. Almost completely Glagolitic to 1840 with some Latinic. | |
| register | | 1824–1832 | Glagolitica I-10 | Croatian State Archives | Porozina | 22 | 28.7 x 19.5 cm | | Izdaci i primici samostana sv. Mikule na Porozini. Acquired by HDA from Fanfogna-Garagnin library. | IzSt |
| christenings, marriages, deaths | | 1825–1830, 1840–1855 | br. 1339 | DaZd | Tkon | | | | Italian and Latinic with some Glagolitic. | DaZd |
| | | 1826–1830 | | Zagreb (Sv. Ksaver) | Glavotok | | | | Konceptna knjiga primitaka i izdataka 1826–1830. Glagolitic title but Latinic. | |
| curses | | 1826 (about) | IV a 80/26 | Arhiv HAZU | North Dalmatia | 2 | | | Zaklinjanja sv. Sisina. Scribe: Mate Puhov of Sali, who also wrote IV a 80/10, 17 and 41. Intended to be worn as an amulet by the children of Antun Puhov (Matina sina): first his daughter who was born January 1826 but died in December, then his son who was born 1827.Photograph made by Arhiv JAZU by 1977 with copy housed as F 117 at Staroslavenski institut. Bibliography: | IzSt (2008) |
| intended masses served | | 1827–1874 | | Monastery of Saint Mary Magdalene in Porat, Krk | Dubašnica, Krk | 178 | 27.8 x 9.5 cm | | Knjiga odsluženih misnih intencija. Glagolitic to 26 December 1840 then Latinic. | |
| receipts and expenditures | | 1827–1849 | br. 100 | Krk (arhiv samostana trećoredaca) | Krk | 157 | 26.8 x 18.6 cm | | Konceptna knjiga primitaka i izdataka. Completely Glagolitic (with Latinic form). Scribe: Pavao Molinari. | |
| | | 1828 | inv. br. 8 | Poljica (župni ured) | Poljica | 10 | 29.5 x 10.3 cm | | Polica vječnih obaveza poljičkog klera. Completely Glagolitic. Begins 23 April 1828. | |
| lexicon | | 1800s (beginning) | | Glavotok | Glavotok | 18 | 36 x 22.8 cm | | Latin-Slavic Lexicon (Latinsko-slavenska leksička građa). Glagolitic and Latinic. Possibly educational exercise. | |
| | | 1800s (beginning) | Garanjin-Fanfonja fond, Glagolitika | Državni arhiv u Splitu | Dračevac Zadarski | 31 | 27.5 x 9.5 cm | | Popis osoba koje daju dohodak od šenice od Dračevca, Gruhov, Visočane, Poličnika, Radovina, Rupan, Bibinja, kod Gospe poviše Arbanas. Completely Glagolitic. | |
| notebook | | 1800s (beginning) | IV a 80/17 | Arhiv HAZU | Sali | 29 | 18.3 x 14.2 cm | | Komad bilježnice Mate Puhova. Glagolitic with hand A f. 1-7 and 29 and hand B the rest. Hand A was Mate Puhov the younger and hand B was Mate Puhov the elder (Mate Šimoncin). Latest entry dated 1828. Photographs and microfilms in Zagreb by 1977. Bibliography: | IzSt |
| | | 1800s (beginning) | IV a 80/49 | Arhiv HAZU | | 2 | 19 x 14 cm | | Iz oficija imenu Marijinu. Only first folio written on, by same hand as IV a 80/1, 4, 12 and others. | |
| homily | | 1800s (beginning) | IV a 80/6 | Arhiv HAZU | | 6 | 20 x 14.5 cm | | Propovijed o paklenim mukama. Scribe: don Ive Vlahić. Written certainly after 20 February 1803 because the last page of the homily is written on a paper used for a circular letter of the Zadar archbishopric with that date. | |
| homily | | 1800s (beginning) | IV a 80/13 | Arhiv HAZU | | 6 | 20 x 14.5 cm | | Propovijed na uznesenje. Scribe: don Ive Vlahić. | |
| homily | | 1800s (beginning) | IV a 80/1 | Arhiv HAZU | | 8 | 23 x 15.6 cm | | Propovijed o davanju računa na samrti. | |
| homily | | 1800s (beginning) | IV a 80/4 | Arhiv HAZU | Ugljan | 2 | 28.5 x 20.2 cm | | Propovijed o Božiću. A note from Ugljan on 20 December 1800 was likely written before the homily. | |
| homily | | 1800s (beginning) | IV a 80/9 | Arhiv HAZU | North Dalmatia | 10 | 19.5 x 14.4 cm | | Dvije propovijedi. | |
| homily | | 1800s (beginning) | IV a 80/12 | Arhiv HAZU | Ugljan | 12 | 19.8 x 14 cm | | Propovijed o mladoj misi. A note written by don Jure Čoban of Sutomišćica parok in Ugljan 1806 exists on it. | |
| homily | | 1800s (beginning) | IV a 80/18 | Arhiv HAZU | North Dalmatia | 2 | 30.5 x 22.5 cm | | Propovijed o ljubavi prema Bogu. | |
| homily | | 1800s (beginning) | IV a 80/7 | Arhiv HAZU | | 4 | 19.3 x 13.8 cm | | Odlomak propovijedi o grijehu. | |
| homily | | 1800s (beginning) | IV a 80/25 | Arhiv HAZU | | 8 | 19.5 x 14 cm | | Poslanica o nedjelji i propovijed. Scribe same as IV a 80/1, 4, 12, 18. Language štokavskoikavski. Consists of 2 bindings, each by a different hand. One scribe probably wrote on f. 8v "D: Jure Çoban" (Čubanov). One photograph in Štefanić 1970. Photocopy from 2007 kept as DVD 10 at HDA and DVD 11(HDA) at Staroslavenski institut. Bibliography: | |
| | | 1800s (beginning) | 10 | Dobrinj (župni ured) | Dobrinj | 66 | 30.5 x 21 cm | | Kapitulska knjiga: stalne mise. Glagolitic then Latinic. | |
| | | 1800s (beginning) | | Omišalj (župni ured) | Omišalj | 19 | 31 x 21 cm | | Zbirčica apokrifnih legenda. Latinic with a Glagolitic? note from a text written by Dume Grego. Contents same as R 3375 in Zagreb, which was written by Dume Grego kurat of Miholjica (by Omišalj), and the much older Arhiv HAZU IV a 48. Scribe: parish priest Nikola Grego (identified from a note in a much younger hand at end). | |
| | | 1800s (beginning) | inv. br. 5 | Poljica (župni ured) | Poljica | 42 | 29.5 x 10.3 cm | | Polica vječnih obaveza poljičkog klera. | |
| | | 1831 | | Galevac (Samostan sv. Pavla) | Galevac | 10 p | 27 x 9.5 cm | | Knjiga dužnika fra Petra Bogdanića. Transcribed in 1831. Mostly Latinic but with Glagolitic on 1, 2r, 9v. | |
| completed masses | | 1833–1855 | inv. br. 21 | Bogovići (župni ured) | Dubašnica | 88 | 45 x 18 cm | | Registar izrečenih misa dubašljanskog klera. Completely Glagolitic from beginning 27 December 1833 to 26 December 1845. Then Italian. | |
| ledger | | 1833–1838 | | Zagreb (Sv. Ksaver) | Glavotok | | | | Blagajnička knjiga glavotočkog samostana. Begins 1 August 1833. | |
| | | 1833 | inv. br. 3 | Poljica (župni ured) | Poljica | 10 | 29.5 x 10.3 cm | | Polica vječnih obaveza poljičkog klera. Completely Glagolitic. Begins May 1833. | |
| | | 1834 | inv. br. 4 | Poljica (župni ured) | Poljica | 12 | 29.5 x 10.3 cm | | Polica vječnih obaveza poljičkog klera. Glagolitic with final 2 folia Latinic. | |
| directory | | 1834 | Glagolitica I-11 | Croatian State Archives | | 5 | 27.7 x 18.9 cm | | Fragmenti Direktorija iz 1834. godine. Acquired by HDA from Fanfogna-Garagnin library. Glagolitic photocopies in Zagreb from 1985 on. | IzSt (2008) |
| | | 1835–1953 | | Glavotok | Glavotok | 150 | 32.5 x 11 cm | | Knjiga zadušnica za umrlu braću. Glagolitic to 1848 then mixed Glagolitic and Latinic to 1855 then Latinic and Italian. | |
| | | 1835–1898 | | Zagreb (Sv. Ksaver) | Glavotok | | | | Knjiga zakladnih misa i zadušnica. Glagolitic to 1848 then Latinic and Italian but last Glagolitic entry 1858. | |
| | | 1836 | inv. br. 15 | Poljica (župni ured) | Poljica | 8 | 28 x 10 cm | | Polica vječnih obaveza poljičkog klera. Completely Glagolitic. | |
| intended masses | | 1837–1858 | | Glavotok | Glavotok | 80 | 32 x 12 cm | | Knjiga misnih intencija fra Vicenca Buića. Completely Glagolitic. | |
| expenditures | | 1837–1842 | | Zagreb (Arhiv Provincijalata franjevaca trećoredaca) | Martinšćica (Samostan sv. Jeronima) | | | | Brought to Zagreb just before the Italian occupation during WWI. | |
| | | 1837 | inv. br. 6 | Poljica (župni ured) | Poljica | 10 | 29.5 x 10.3 cm | | Polica vječnih obaveza poljičkog klera. Completely Glagolitic. | |
| | | 1838–1908 | br. 118 | Krk (arhiv samostana trećoredaca) | Krk | 45 | 29.5 x 10 cm | | Knjiga zadušnica za pokojne redovnike. Glagolitic to 1850 then Latinic and Italian. Glagolitic scribe: Pavao Molinari. | |
| mass register | | 1838–1863 | | Galevac (Samostan sv. Pavla) | Galevac | 66 p | 33.2 x 12.4 cm | | Completely Glagolitic with the exception of a few Italian entries. | |
| | | 1838–1839 | inv. br. 10 | Poljica (župni ured) | Poljica | 8 | 29.5 x 10.3 cm | | Polica vječnih obaveza poljičkog klera. Completely Glagolitic. Written April 27, 1838 to April 26, 1839. | |
| | | 1820s-1850s | IX D 10/6 | Prague (National Museum) | | 242 | | | Opisy listin a nápisů a jiné materiálie k písemnictví jihoslovanskému. Various scribes. Cyrillic and Latinic with some Glagolitic possible, especially from 1830s on. | |
| | | 1800s (before 1840) | IX D 10/4 | Prague (National Museum) | | 8 + 3 | 29 x 22.5 cm | | | Přepisy listin charvátských ma materiálie jich se týkající (Diplomata glagolitica). Scribe: Pavel Josef Šafařík. Latinic transcriptions of Glagolitic with some Glagolitic possible. Published 1840 in Danica Illirska (volume 40) and in Летопис Српски 1841 (volume II). |
| | | 1800s | IX D 10/5 | Prague (National Museum) | | 44 | 28 x 21.8 cm | | Přepisy listin ze stol. 12.-17. Cyrillic transcriptions of Glagolitic texts by Pavel Josef Šafařík. Cyrillic with some Glagolitic possible. | |
| ledger | | 1840–1843 | | Zagreb (Sv. Ksaver) | Glavotok | | | | Dio blagajničke knjige glavotočkog samostana. Begins September 1840. | |
| | | 1841–1847 | HR–DAZD–359 (Obitelj Lantana collection) kut. 17 sign. 264 | DaZd | | 89 | | | Mise plaćena za dušu pokojnog oca i drugih članova obitelji Marca Antonija Lantane. Latinic with Glagolitic on f. 55. Part of Lantana family archive. Acquired by Državni arhiv u Zadru 1945. | |
| notes | | 1840s | | Vrgada (sakristija župne crkve) | Vrgada | | | | The remains of various Glagolitic missals were collected and placed inside a cover made from a missal fragment. On these remains there are Glagolitic and Latinic notes. Including a Latinic one by Šime Banov of Vrgada from 1843. | |
| receipts and expenditures | | 1842–1875 | | Glavotok | Glavotok | 210 | 33.2 x 25 cm | | Glagolitic to October 1857 then Latin and Latinic from 1859. Glagolitic with Latinic ductus. | |
| chronicle | | 1843? | | Glavotok | Glavotok | 44 | 38.5 x 25 cm | | Knjiga anniversarija. Glagolitic. Script uncharacteristically conservative for period. | |
| | | 1844/1845 | IX C 12 | Prague (National Museum) | | 160 | 30 x 22 cm | | Evangelium remešské. Scribe: Václav Hanka. Manuscript later printed. Latinic and Cyrillic with some Glagolitic possible. | |
| | | 1846–1948 | | Galevac (Samostan sv. Pavla) | Galevac | 94 p | 35 x 11.7 cm | | Knjiga zadušnica za preminule redovnike Samostana sv. Pavla na Školjiću 1846–1948. Glagolitic and Latinic with some Italian notes. | |
| | | 1852 | IX B 2 | Prague (National Museum) | | 18 | 35 x 22 cm | | Výpisky o hlaholském a cyrilském písemnictví (Collectanea glagolitica). Scribe: Pavel Josef Šafařík. The manuscript for Šafařík's Pam. hlah. Latinic and Cyrillic with some Glagolitic possible. | |
| | | 1852 | IX D 26 | Prague (National Museum) | | 5 + 56 | 26.5 x 21.5 cm | | Srovnání textu kodexu assemanova s evang. ostromirovým, lat. vulgátou a s textem řeckým. Scribe: Pavel Josef Šafařík. Latinic and Cyrillic with some Glagolitic possible. | |
| | | 1853 | IX E 6 | Prague (National Museum) | | 34 | 25.5 x 20.3 cm | | Poznámky o statutech. Scribe: Pavel Josef Šafařík. Latinic with some Glagolitic possible. Manuscript of a work by Šafařík on the Kastav statute. | |
| | | 1856 (November 25) – 1857 (January 20) | IX H 15 | Prague (National Museum) | | 107 | 14 x 11.5 cm | | Hlaholský žaltář lobkovický. Scribes: "Šulc" (a library scribe) and "Herman" (a student at the Reálné gymnázium v Ječné). Glagolitic transcription of the Lobkovićev psaltir. | |
| | | 1856 | IX F 2 | Prague (National Museum) | | 26 | 22 x 18 cm | | Různočtení z hlaholských a cyrilských textů novozákoních. Latinic with some Glagolitic possible. Scribe: Pavel Josef Šafařík. | |
| | | 1857 | IX D 12 | Prague (National Museum) | | 72 | 28 x 23 cm | | Žaltář lobkovický z r. 1359. Scribe: Pavel Josef Šafařík. Latinic with Glagolitic possible. | |
| | | 1857 | IX E 20 | Prague (National Museum) | | 111 | 24.5 x 19 cm | | Hlaholský žaltář z breviáře pažmanského. Scribe: Pavel Josef Šafařík. Manuscript for a printed book. Latinic with some Glagolitic possible. | |
| note | | 1866 | | Karlobag (Capuchin Monastery) | | | | | Mixed Glagolitic-Cyrillic note by Matija "Mate" Grynhut/Grünhut as a novomisnik that his copy of the 1706 missal had been given to him by vladika Venceslav Soić. Grünhut was noted by Soić in 1882 to be among the priests of the Senj-Modruš bishopric who still served mass from a Glagolitic missal. | |
| legal | | 1873 | R 3358 | NSK | | 10 (8 Glag.) | | 1 co | Transcription of legal documents from 1525, 1513, 1476, 1475, 1431, undated, 1555, undated and 2 Cyrillic. Scribe: Velimir Gaj. | GHR, NSK |
| | | 1887 | | Krk (arhiv samostana trećoredaca) | Krk | 84 | 21 x 17 cm | | Ekscerpt Staroslavenske gramatike J. Dobrovskoga. Latin with Glagolitic letter and language examples. Scribe: Danijel Zec. Copy of text likely written by Benedikt Mihaljević (1768–1855), teacher of Old Church Slavonic at the zadarsko sjemenište. | |
| transcription | | 1888.XII.23-1889 | R 6014 | NSK | Barban | 16 | | | Podaci o natpisima u Barbanu uz Stablo obitelji Stanković. By Josip Antun Batel. Larger part Latinic and smaller part Glagolitic. | NSK |
| breviary | BrVat₂₂ | 1800s | Borgiano illirico 22 | Vatican Library | | 107 | | | Vatikanski brevijar Illirico 22 (Vatican breviary Illirico 22). | |
| annerversaries | | 1800s | | Arhiv Zadarske nadbiskupije | Ist | 90 | 22 x 15.5 cm | | Knjiga godova. Glagolitic regularly to 1816 then Latinic, with last Glagolitic entry in 1818. Scribe: mostly don Matij Gojdanić (parish priest of Ist 1784–1815) | GL, PB |
| grammar | | 1800s | Glagolitica I-20 (also G-2) | HDA | | 12 | 28.7 x 20 cm | | Old Church Slavonic Grammar (Staroslavenska gramatika, Gramatica Slavica dialecti Veteris). Mixed Glagolitic and Latinic. | IzSt (2008) |
| grammar | | 1800s | | Galevac (Samostan sv. Pavla) | Galevac | 12 p | 33 x 27 cm | | Staroslavenska gramatika – skripta za 3. godinu bogoslovije. Compiled by fra Benedikt Mihaljević. | |
| | | 1800s (beginning) | Arhiv obitelji Garanjin-Fanfonja, glagolitika | Državni arhiv u Splitu | Veli Iž | 40 | 19 x 13.5 cm | | Štima od maslina Fanfunićevih. Don Marko Baćina is mentioned. | |
| | | 1800s | R 4469(42) | NSK | | 2 | | | Prijepis supskripcije i zapise na l. 269 misala kneza Novaka. Transcription by Franc Miklošič in Glagolitic and Cyrillic of parts of f. 269 of Novak's Missal. | |
| | | 1800s | R 4469(90) | NSK | | 2 | | | Prijepis iz knjige Paleographia universelle IV. Transcription by Franc Miklošič. | |
| | | 1800s | R 4584 | NSK | | 336 | | | Prijepisi i faksimili glagoljskih, ćiriličnih i drugih spomenika iz ostavštine Vatroslava Jagića. | |
| | | 1800s | R 6807 | NSK | | 1 | | | 19th century transcription of the 16th century inscription on the Crkva sv. Fabijana i Sebastijana in Novi Vinodolski. Paper. | |
| grammar | | 1800s | Glagolitica I-20 | Croatian State Archives | Croatia | 12 | | | Staroslavenska gramatika (Old Church Slavonic grammar). Donated to HDA by Branko Kursar in 1962. | |
| letter | | 1800s | HR–DAZD–359 (Obitelj Lantana collection) kut. 19 sign. 292 | DaZd | | 2 | | | Correspondence between Marco Antonio Lantana and Augusta. Part of Lantana family archive. Acquired by Državni arhiv u Zadru 1945. | |
| table | | 1800s (beginning) | R 3360 (St. sign. SM.32.F.12) | NSK | Croatia | 1 | 21.5 x 15.1 cm | | Tabula nova mis vičnih za duše purgatorija. | NSK |
| | | 1800s | II d 123 (Kuk. 846), II d 57 (Kuk. 993) | Arhiv HAZU | | 67, 16 | 34 x 24 cm, 34 x 21 cm | | Volčićevi prijepisi Veprinačkih zapisnika. Latinic with some Glagolitic numbers. | |
| abecedary | | 1800s | IX F 28 | Prague (National Museum) | | 44 | 20.5 x 17 cm | | Cyrilská a hlaholská abeceda. Glagolitic, Cyrillic, Latinic. Scribe: J. K. Erbenových. | |
