= Old Church Slavonic Institute =

The Old Church Slavonic Institute (Croatian: Staroslavenski institut) is a Croatian public institute founded in 1952 by the state for the purpose of scientific research on the language, literature and paleography of the mediaeval literary heritage of the Croatian vernacular, Croatian recension of Church Slavonic and Glagolitic script. It succeeded the Old Church Slavonic Academy, founded in 1902 in Krk.

== History ==
The institute presents the continuation of the Old Church Slavonic Academy that was founded in 1902 and incorporated into the Croatian Theological Academy in Zagreb as its Old Church Slavonic department in 1928. In 1948, Msgr. Svetozar Ritig succeeded in reviving the Old Church Slavonic Academy in Zagreb, the result of which was the renaming of the Academy into an Institute.

== Research ==
For the purpose of its research, the Old Church Slavonic Institute has created a specialised library containing prints and microfilms of all relevant Glagolitic manuscripts, the originals of which are kept in various institutions in Croatia and around the world. Its work is primarily channelled into the following publications:

- Slovo 1 (1952) - 54-55 (2006), published annually
- Radovi Staroslavenskog instituta 1 (1952) – 9 (1988), published periodically

The Institute has published numerous facsimiles and transliterations of the Glagolitic codices, fragments and reprinted Glagolitic books. Its active research projects include creating the grammar and the dictionary of Croatian Church Slavonic in the period of 12 - 16th centuries.

== List of directors ==
=== Presidents of the Academy ===
1. ...
2. Matija Oršić (1912–)
3. ...

=== Directors of the Institute ===
1. Svetozar Ritig (1952–1961)
2. Vjekoslav Štefanić (1961–1967)
3. Anica Nazor (1967–1978)
4. Biserka Grabar (1978–1986)
5. Anica Nazor (1986–2005)
6. Marica Čunčić (2005 – 18 September 2017)
7. Vida Vukoja (2017–)

== Academy founders ==
Parčić and Strossmayer died shortly after joining. As of 1913:

1. Anton Mahnič (patron, joined 18 November 1902), Bishop of Krk
2. Matija Oršić (president, joined 1906), canon in Krk
3. Nikola Žic (vice president), professor in Krk
4. Mate Polonijo (secretary, joined 1905), chancellor of the episcopal curia of Kurk
5. Jakov Dminić (treasurer, joined 1902), canon in Krk
6. Antun Gršković (councilman), canon in Krk
7. Vinko Premuda (councilman, joined 1902), pastor in Vrh
8. Ignacije Radić (councilman), abbot of Sv. Franjo Asiški in Krk
9. Antun Orlić (treasury auditor, joined 1902), parish priest in Krk
10. Mate Gršković (treasury auditor), catechist in retirement
11. Juraj Posilović (founding member), Bishop of Zagreb
12. Josip Juraj Strossmayer (founding member), Bishop of Đakovo
13. Dragutin Antun Parčić (founding member), canon at St. Jerome
14. Josef Vajs (funding member, joined 1902), university docent in Prague
15. Franjo Pavao Volarić (funding member, joined 18 November 1902), parish priest in Vrbnik
16. Dinko Vitezić (member, joined 18 November 1902), royal chief financial advisor
17. Vatroslav Jagić (funding member joined 1902), professor emeritus in Vienna
18. Josip Mrakovčić (funding member, joined 1902), retired parish priest in Punat
19. Josip Marčelić (funding member, joined 1903), Bishop of Dubrovnik
20. Josip Ožbolt (funding member, joined 1903), doctor in Rijeka
21. Antun Alfirević (funding member, joined 1905), gymnasium catechist in Split
22. Filip Nakić (joined 23 November 1905), Archbishop of Split
23. Fran Sales Bauer (funding member, joined 1906), Archbishop of Olomouc
24. Ivan Marek (funding member, joined 1906), canon in Prague
25. Ivan Pavao Sparožić (funding member, joined 1908), curate in Sušak
26. Českoslovanská knihovna bohoslovců Olomouckých (funder, joined 1910)
27. Pavao Milovčić (funding member, joined 1910), catechist in retirement in Dubašnica
28. Antun Nedvĕd (funding member, joined 1910), retired parish priest in Šterna
29. Knjižnica reda sv. Franje Konventualaca in Šibenik (funder, joined 1911)
30. Ivan Butković (funding member, joined 1912), theology professor in Zadar
31. Rudolf Strohal (funding member, joined 1912), gymnasium rector emeritus in Zagreb
32. Ulisse de Nunzio (honorary member from March 1913), professor of Slavic studies in Rome

=== Early Academy members ===
List of members of the Old Church Slavonic Academy in Krk as of 1914:

1. Ante Banić, Archpriest of Nin
2. Antun Andrijčić (b. Punat), MP in the Diet of Istria
3. Antun Antončić (b. Omišalj), politician
4. Mihovil Barada (b. Seget), priest
5. Janko Barlè (b. Budanje, joined 1914), Zagreb Cathedral prebendary
6. Grgur Berkan, Rakotule parish administrator
7. Josip Bervaldi (b. Stari Grad), priest and historian
8. Tomo Bilić (joined 1914), priest in Betina
9. Fran Binički (b. Malo Selo by Mušaluk, joined 1914), theology professor in Sinj
10. Josip Bogović, curate in Stara Baška
11. Toma Bogović, pastor in Sv. Fuska
12. Silvestar Bonačić, archpriest of Vis
13. Kvirin Klement Bonefačić (b. Baška), future Archbishop of Split
14. Antun Bonifačić, parish priest of Novalja
15. Fran Brajević (joined 1914), merchant in Split
16. Toma Brbić, OFM, in Plina
17. Mate Brusić, chaplain on Susak
18. Frane Bulić (b. Vranjic, priest and archaeologist
19. Valentin Canjko, catechist in Varaždin
20. Pacifik Car, parish priest of Barbat
21. Jakov Colombis, post official of Mali Lošinj
22. Mate Cvetko, parish priest of Novi
23. Đuro Červar (b. Červari), politician
24. Juraj Čubranić, pastor of Baška Draga
25. Ivo Damianjević, curial administrator of Predošćica
26. Josip Damić, parish priest of Vid
27. Đuro Dorotić, chaplain in Vis
28. Matija Dubrović, chaplain in Opatija
29. Antun Ellner, parish priest of Brest
30. Antun Fabijanić, chaplain in Baška
31. Nikola Fabijanić, doctor in Volosko
32. Henrik Fantiš, parish priest of Slivno
33. Pravdoslav Filiplić, parish priest of Žminj
34. Josip Flegar, parish priest of Šušnjevica
35. Josip Flego, parish priest of Slum
36. Josip Frančisković (b. Praputnjak, joined 1914), canon in Senj
37. Nikola Franki, gymnasium catechist in Ogulin
38. Fran Frankola, professor in Pazin
39. Šime Frulić, parish priest in Grdoselo
40. Grgo Fugošić, parish priest in Omišalj
41. Jozo Grabovac, priest in Komin
42. Josip Grašić (b. Križe), parish priest in Beram
43. Jerko Grčković (b. Vrbnik, parish priest emeritus of Vrbnik
44. Nikola Grego, chaplain in Omišalj
45. Luka Grgić, catechist in Split
46. Ivan Grgin, priest in Podgora
47. Antun Gršković, canon in Krk
48. Ivan Gršković, curate on Unije
49. Mate Gršković (b. Vrbnik), catechist in Krk
50. Dragutin Hlača (b. Grobnik), curate in Martinšćica
51. Frano Ivanišević (b. Jesenice), parish priest emeritus in Split
52. Leopold Ivanišević, canon in Split
53. Marko Ivanišević, spiritual assistant in Podgora
54. Srećko Ivasović, priest in Sveti Filip i Jakov
55. Konrad Janežič (b. Radovljica), lawyer in Volosko
56. Fran Jerkunica, parish priest in Kaštel Sućurac
57. Andrija Juranić, chaplain in Risika
58. Ivan Juranić, chaplain in Dubašnica
59. Antun Kalac (b. Žbrlini by Beram), deacon in Pazin
60. Mijo Kalebić, priest in Dugopolje
61. Marko Kalogjera (b. Blato), parish priest in Split
62. Mate Kević, (Note: Published Najstariji spomenici hrvatske izvorne umjetne lirike in 1910.) professor in Pazin
63. Ivan Koruza, parish priest in Klana
64. Ivan Koštiál (b. Graz), professor in Gorica
65. Josip Kraljić (b. Bogovići), chaplain in Trieste
66. Toma Kraljić, parish priest in Poljica
67. Franjo Krivičić, chaplain in Mali Lošinj
68. Stjepan Kropek, parish priest in Stari Pazin
69. Ivan Kumbatović (b. Omišalj), parish priest in Lukovdol
70. Henrik Leban, teacher in Prosek
71. Andrija Lovrinčević, parish priest in Krivodol
72. Ivan Lubin, parish priest in Kaštel Sućurac
73. Ivan Luk, parish priest in Lovran
74. Antun Lusina, parish administrator in Cres
75. Jakov Maračić, parish priest of Dubašnica
76. Mate Maračić, pastor in Supetarska
77. Dinko Marinculić, pastor emeritus in Nerezine
78. Ivan Martinović, in Štilje
79. Pavao Matovac, parish priest in Aržano
80. Leo Josip Medić (b. Kaštel Novi), OFM, missionary in Chicago
81. Toma Mihatov (joined 1914), pastor in Pašman
82. Ivan Milčetić (b. Milčetići), professor emeritus in Varaždin
83. Ivan Milohnić, professor emeritus in Cres
84. Matej Milovčić, parish priest in Baška
85. Toma Morović, parish priest emeritus in Gradac
86. Antun Mrakovčić, priest in Pag
87. Miho Mužina, parish priest in Omišalj
88. Antun Nežić, parish priest in Čepić
89. Petar Orlić, curate in Sveti Vid
90. Ivan Oršić, parish priest in Barbat
91. Matej Oršić, curial administrator of Orlec
92. Episcopal Ordinariate in Šibenik
93. Josip Palčić, episcopal treasurer in Krk
94. Josip Papić, chaplain in Punat
95. Nikola Parčić, chaplain in Nerezine
96. Josip Pavačić, curate in Belej
97. Damjan Pavlov, parish priest in Kaštel Gomilica
98. Josip Pazman (b. Pakrac), rector of Zagreb University
99. Antun Petriš, pastor in Mundanije
100. Antun Pilepić, chaplain in Krk
101. Petar Plepel, OFM, Perković
102. Roko Počina, professor of Glagolitic in Zadar
103. Mate Polić, parish priest of Vališ Selo
104. Nikola Poliš, parish priest of Jelenje
105. Vjenceslav Potočnjak, parish priest of Draga
106. Vinko Pulišić (b. Olib, joined 1914), Archbishop of Zadar
107. Provincijalat franjevaca trećoredaca in Zadar
108. Directorate of the Diocesan Seminary in Travnik
109. Mijo Rubić, priest in Poljica
110. Conventual Franciscan Monastery in Cres
111. Franciscan Monastery in Virovitica
112. Franciscan Monastery of Saint Domnius in Kraj
113. Franciscan Monastery of Our Lady of Trsat
114. Franciscan Monastery of the Ascension of Mary on Badija (joined 1914)
115. Franciscan Monastery of Saint Mary Magdalene in Porat
116. Franciscan Monastery in Glavotok
117. Sv. Franjo Asiški Monastery in Krk
118. Franciscan Monastery of Saint Paul the Anchorite on Galovac
119. Jaroslav Sedláček (b. Hostomice, professor in Smíchov
120. Ivan Seršić, curate on Kornić
121. Ivan Sintić, parish priest emeritus in Mali Lošinj
122. Librat Sloković, parish priest of Sveti Petar u Šumi
123. Blaž Soldatić, parish priest of Lopar
124. Ivan Leonard Sparožić, chaplain in Ilovik
125. Vjekoslav Spinčić (b. Spinčići by Kastav), professor emeritus in Opatija
126. Anrija Stanger (b. Volosko), lawyer in Volosko
127. Franjo Stavělík (b. Moravia), parish priest of Karojba
128. Roko Stuparich, parish priest of Veli Lošinj
129. Jan Ladislav Sýkora (b. Železnice), professor emeritus in Prague
130. Andrey Sheptytsky (b. Prylbychi), Greek Catholic Archbishop of Lvov
131. Pavao Šabalja, chaplain in Rasopasno
132. Antun Šebesta, parish priest of Cere
133. Mate Škarica, priest in Slatine
134. Mate Tentor (b. Cres), gymnasium professor in Volosko
135. Mijo Tomasović, (b. Kučiće), curate in Kučiće
136. Grgo Topić, curate in Svinišće
137. Dinko Trinajstić (b. Vrbnik), lawyer in Pazin
138. Ivan Trinajstić, parish priest of Dobrinj
139. Nikola Tabulov Truta, theology professor in Zadar
140. Nikola Turato, archpriest in Cres
141. Parish administration of Biograd na Moru
142. Vincenc Vaněk, associate in Uherský Brod
143. Ivan Vidas (joined 1914), canon in Senj
144. Stanislav Vidović, priest in Stanišće by Trogir
145. Bartuo Vitezić, parish priest emeritus of Vrbnik
146. Luka Vitezić, canon in Cres
147. Fran Kvirin Volarić, archpriest of Osor
148. Ivan Volarić, parish priest of Draga Bašćanska
149. Vjekoslav Volarić, parish priest of Beli
150. Ivan Vuletin, parish priest of Kaštel Novi
151. Petar Zahija, parish priest in Rab
152. Ivan Zanki, parish priest of Seget
153. Zbor duh. mladeži in Zadar
154. Antun Zidarić, parish priest of Kršan
155. Ivan Žamić, priest in Donja Brela
156. Ante Žarnić, priest in Otrić-Struge
157. Frane Žic, parish priest of Punat
158. Ivan Žic, chaplain in Polje

== Bibliography ==
- "Staroslavenski institut". Croatian Encyclopedia (in Croatian). 8 May 2013.
- Nazor, Anica (June 1989). "Staroslavenski Institut »Svetozar Ritig« u Zagrebu" (PDF). Rasprave (in Croatian). 15 (1). Institute of Croatian Language and Linguistics.
- StIn (2017). "Ravnateljica dr. sc. Marica Čunčić odlazi u mirovinu" [Rector dr. sc. Marica Čunčić Leaves for Retirement]. Staroslavenski institut (in Croatian). Archived from the original on 2021-09-22.
- Žic, Nikola (1913b). "Članovi" [Glagolitic Collections]. Vjesnik Staroslavenske akademije u Krku (in Croatian). 1 (published 1914): 11–18.
- Žic, Nikola (1913a). "Članovi" [Glagolitic Collections]. Vjesnik Staroslavenske akademije u Krku (in Croatian). 1 (published 1914): 3–10.
- Žic, Nikola (1912b). "Sjednice i skupštine". Vjesnik Staroslavenske akademije u Krku (in Croatian). 1 (published 1913): 17–26.
- Žic, Nikola (1912a). "Članovi". Vjesnik Staroslavenske akademije u Krku (in Croatian). 1 (published 1913): 10–16.
- S., L. (1912) [written 1913-01-12]. "Pravila Staroslavenske akademije". Vjesnik Staroslavenske akademije u Krku (in Croatian). 1 (published 1913): 5–8.
- Mahulja, Jerko J. (1906a). "Krčki kotar: Skupština "Staroslavenske akademije"" [Krk Kotar: Meeting of the "Staroslavenska akademija"] (PDF). Naša sloga: Poučni, gospodarski i politički list (in Serbo-Croatian). Vol. 39, no. 4. p. 3.
