= List of Glagolitic manuscripts (1400–1499) =

This is a list of manuscripts written in the Glagolitic script in the 15th century.

== List ==
Light red represents manuscripts with Glagolitic only in inclusions or paratext.
Pale red represents mixed manuscripts with Glagolitic as a main script.

Type	Abbreviation	Date	Designation	Library	Place of origin	Folia	Dimensions	Columns and rows	Notes	Scans
valuation		1400 (March 21)		HDA	Dobrinj	1		1 co	Pribko iz Senja daje procijeniti vrijednost svojeg trsja u Dobrinjskoj drazi, a koje mu je na ime duga uzeo prokurator Petar Sila. A Cyrillic transcription by Lopašić is kept in Arhiv HAZU. Parchment.	
missal	Fg(M)I-3	1400 (about)	Glagolitica I-3	HDA	Croatia	4+1	20 x 7 cm	2 co	Fragmenti misala s kraja 14. ili početka 15. st. Fragments had served as cover to a copy of a 1586 book. Includes Matthew 2, 4, 8, Ezekiel 34, Sirach 24, Saint Augustine. and Latin abecedary. Donated by Vanja Radauš to HDA in 1968. Nahtigal compared it to the Ljubljana missal 162a/2.	IzSt (2008)
missal	MBrl	1402	Ms. Ham. 444	SBB	Krbava	218	31.5 x 21.5 cm	2 co x 31 ro	Berlinski misal (Berlin missal). Written and illuminated by Bartol Krbavac. Housed in Rome 1738–1742, and in London, and from 1822 in Berlin. Possibly catalogued in Rome 1771 but rediscovered by scholars in 1956. Photocopies and microfilms in Zagreb by 1977. Bibliography:	SBB, NSK, IzSt (2010)
miscellany	CHva	1404	I.359 (Ms 3575B, or 3575 B)	Biblioteca Universitaria di Bologna	Bosnia	359	17 x 11 cm	2 co	Hval miscellany (Hvalov zbornik). Written by a scribe named Hval. Cyrillic with Glagolitic Dzělo in index to John. Photocopies in Zagreb by 1950. Bibliography:	NSK, GHR
missal	MHrv	1404 (about)	?	Topkapı Palace	Bosnia	247	30.6 x 22.5 cm		Misal Hrvoja Vukčića Hrvatinića (Missal of Hrvoje Vukčić Hrvatinić). Written by a scribe named Butko. Contains 94 miniatures and 380 initials. It was lost between the chromolithography of 1891 and its rediscovery in 1963. It is not known how it came to its present location. It was discovered 1963. Facsimile published 1973 in Zagreb-Ljubljana-Graz. Bibliography:	NSK, GHR, IzSt (2008), IzSt (2008 from 1973)
breviary	BrDrg (BrDrag)	1407	III b 25	Arhiv HAZU	Croatia	196	29.3 x 20.6 cm	2 co x 40-42 ro	Dragućki brevijar (Draguć breviary). Written by 3-4 hands: A on f. 1-44, B on f. 44-127 and 133–156, C on f. 22 and 127d-132d, and maybe f. 190-195 (the calensar), D on 157-189 (which differs little from C but is less symmetrical and sometimes slanted). Written 1407 or maybe 1408 in an ikavian area (east of Istria), possibly with the same fate as MNov: being brought to Istria after the Battle of Krbava, where the ekavian notes were made. The calendar focuses on Zadar saints and was likely written by Pavlini, with the saints of other orders added later when it was brought to Draguć. A later note from 1566 attests to its presence in Hum. It is unknown where Kukuljević obtained it. Photograph of one page published in Štefanić 1970. Microfilm (Staroslavenski institut M 145, HDA G-133 (ZM 65/6)) made 1980, the same year as photocopies (Star. inst. F 156, 156b).	IzSt (2008)
legal		1410 (June 10)			Modruš				Modruški kaptol prepisuje listinu kralja Matijaša, u kojoj se daju njeka imanja fratrom sv. Mikule na Gvozdu. Survives only in Latinic transcription, acquired by Kukuljević.	
decalogue		1412		Prague (Emmaus Monastery)	Prague (Emmaus Monastery)				Emmaus Glagolitic Inscription (Emauzský hlaholský nápis). Painted on the wall rather than inscribed, so a graffito but not a true inscription. The Emmaus Monastery had been damaged in the February 1945 bombing, so this inscription was discovered during its restoration in the second half of the 1950s. The graffito is on the south wall of the east wing of the ground floor of the monastery, where the chapter house was.	
		1413 (April 11)	GL. II.1.	Arhiv HAZU	Baška	1	23.5 x 10.5 cm	1 co	Ivanola, sin Petra Prvošića, daruje samostanu sv. Nikole zemlju u Bašci. Acquired by Kukuljević, then by JAZU. First published by Šafarik 1853.	
legal		1414	Sign. Gl. II.2	Arhiv HAZU	Baška				Zela, žena Kablovićeva, daruje samostanu sv. Spasa zemlju u Bašci. Acquired by Kukuljević.	
breviary		1414							Bakarski brevijar. Lost. Only notes survive, only in transcription.	
Comestor	FgKrt	1400s (early)	J 4118	Prague (Emmaus Monastery)	Slovak National Library	1	36.5 x 25 cm	2 co	Krtíški odlomak. Part of the Czech Glagolitic translation of the Comestor of Peter of Troyes. Thought by Jagić to have been brought to Slovakia following the Battle of the White Mountain of 1620. Once used as cover of a translation of Luther's Pastoral owned by a priest Ezekiel dated 1633. Discovered by Samuel Zoch in the library of the Kalmár family in Velky Krtíš. After 1918 it entered the archives of the Muzej slovenskej spoločnosti in Martin, having been donated by Zoch's son-in-law Jozef Dohnány. In 1930 the archivist Mária Jeršová-Opočenská lent it to professor František Ryšánek. It was lost until Milan Vároš unsuccessfully searched for it in 2007, but Leon Sokolovský joined the search and found it and in 2008 it was given to the Slovak National Library.	WDL
Comestor		1400s (early)		Martin (Archív Matice slovenskej)					Same as FgKrt?	
Comestor		1300s/1400s	1 D c 1/16	Prague (National Museum)	Prague (Emmaus Monastery)	2	31.5 x 25 cm		Zbytky ze "Všeobecného dějepisu". Part of the Staročeský glagolský Comestor. Its existence was first noted by F. Ryšánek according to Pacnerova, but it was known by Dobrovsky according to Čermak. Someone, possibly V. Hanka, discovered it in the Cistercian monastery in the Vyšší Brod Monastery. Bibliography:	
Comestor		1300s/1400s	1 D c 1/18	Prague (National Museum)	Prague (Emmaus Monastery)	2	29.5 x 23.5 cm		Zlomky české hlaholsky psané bible. Incorrectly identified as part of the Czech Glagolitic Bible. Actually part of the Staročeský glagolský Comestor. Discovered in 1815 in the Vyšší Brod Monastery, and acquired by the National Museum presumably through the Václav Hanka collection. Its existence was first published by J. Izvěkov. Part published 1905. Bibliography:	
breviary		1300s (second half)	1 D c 1/3 (A-D), 1/11	Prague (National Museum)	Croatia/Prague	4 + 1	21.8 x 17 cm	2 co 37 ro	Útržky a zlomek římského breviáře. Nothing is known about the discovery of either 1/3 or 1/11 save that they were first catalogued by Milčetić 1911. 1/11, 1/3C and 1/3D were once part of the same folio. Bibliography:	
breviary		1300s (second half)	n/a	n/a	Croatia	2	25 x 19 cm	2 co 32 ro	Olomoucké zlomky breviáře. Discovered at the Olomouc museum by secretary V. Houdek and shown to Pastrnek about 2 years before he published their text in 1895. Lost likely during WWII, still lost as of 2020. Transcription published but unless a photograph has survived it may be permanently lost. It could have been lost in the decades after WWII when the documents of many archives were moved around and before most photocopies and microfilms had been made so researchers often had to borrow originals, as was the case with the Archivní zlomek hlaholského Comestora, discovered by 1923, housed at the Státní archivní škola and published in Ryšánek 1948 but reported missing by Pacnerová 2002. Bibliography:	
missal		1300s			Croatia	2	33.5 x 23.5 cm	2 co 39 ro	A missal fragment last recorded in the cancelled Book museum in Žďár nad Sázavou. It was discovered in the 1980s, reported in Pacnerová 1989, but reported missing by 1990.	
missal		1300s (second half)	1 D c 1/5	Prague (National Museum)	Prague (Emmaus Monastery)	2	32 x 22 cm	2 co 32 ro	Praskoleský zlomek chorvatsko-hlaholského misálu. Discovered by Karel Jaromír Erben in the Praskolesy parish in 1842. Partial facsimile in Čermak 2020. Bibliography:	
missal		1300 (second half)	no sign.	Milevsko (Premonstratensian Monastery)	Croatia/Prague	1	26 x 20 cm	2 co 23 ro	Milevský zlomek misálu. Used in the cover of a copy of the 1616 book Institutiones dialecticae (old sign. O 190), which was originally in the Capuchin monastery in Prague at Hradčany (at least as late as 1650 when the book was catalogued there). Discovered in 1999 by Karel Dolista, who handed it over in October that year to the Premonstratensian monastery at Milevsko. First published by Čermak 2014. Photograph of 1 page in Čermak 2020.	
missal		1300s (second half)	1 D c 1/6	Prague (National Museum)	Prague (Emmaus Monastery)	2	34 x 23 cm	2 co 33 ro	Trutnovský zlomek chorvatsko-hlaholského misálu (sv. Štěpán). Discovered by František Petera Rohoznický in the parish of Trutnov in the cover of an unspecified parish register in 1858. The use as a parish register left some younger notes from 1643 to 1670 on the fragment. Partial facsimile in Čermak 2020. Bibliography:	
lectionary		1300s (second half)	1 D c 1/7 AB	Prague (National Museum)	Croatia/Prague	2	23 x 17 cm		Zlomky charvátskohlaholského lekcionáře (A is Pešťansjý zlomek, B is Turnovský zlomek). B was discovered about 1820 through V. Hanka, possibly in the Turnov parish. A was discovered by František Belus in 1856 in the cover of a Philosophia sobria printed 1614–1623 in the Spiritual Seminary library in Pest. Photograph of 1 page in Čermak 2020. Bibliography:	
martyrology		1300s/1400s	Cerr II, č. 159	Moravský zemský archiv v Brně	Croatia/Prague	1	29.5 x 21.5 cm	1 co 23 ro	Roman Martyrology fragment (Řimské martyrologium). Discovered by Jan Maria Petr Cerroni by 1818, possibly in Vienna. Photograph of 1 page in Čermak 2020. Bibliography:	
		1300s (second half)	XVII J 17/6 ABC	Prague (National Library=	Croatia/Prague	3			Undetermined Glagolitic Fragments (Neurčené hlaholské zlomky). Fragments A, B, C are each very small. Discovered in the 1860s possibly by I. J. Hanuš, in the Clementinum in the cover of Aquis granum (sign. IX B 29).	
Comestor		1400s (early)	inv. č. 4613	Státní oblastní archiv v Třeboni	Prague (Emmaus Monastery)	8			Třeboňské zlomky I. 4 fragments all of the same manuscript. Discovered by Adolf Kalný at the end of 1959 in the bindings of the Buquoy fund of Nová Hrad in the Statní oblastní archiv in Třeboň. One of them was taken from the receipts and expenditures book of the Chapel of the Seven Sorrows of Virgin Mary in Herrnlesbrunn (in the village of Rožmberk on the Vltava). Bibliography:	
Comestor		1400s (early)	inv. č. 4613	Státní oblastní archiv v Třeboni	Prague (Emmaus Monastery)	12			Třeboňské zlomky II. 6 bifolia. Discovered in the bindings of orphan registers from the 17th and 18th centuries from the collections of the Rožmberk Great Estate, discovered there by Adolf Kalný in 1964. Bibliography: Text of the fragments published by Pacnerová 1969. They are important in the study of Glagolitic higher numerals.	
Comestor		1400s (early)		Prague (Knihovna archivní školy)	Prague (Emmaus Monastery)	2			Zlomek archivní školy. Discovered on the cover of a farm book of a South Bohemian patrimony on the Rožmberk estate, which was kept in the State archive in Prague and later in the library there. Published 1948. Bibliography: It is now missing.	
bible	BibVyš	1416	XVII A 1	Prague (Národna knihovna ČR)	Prague (Emmaus Monastery)	258	38.5 x 28 cm		Vyšebrod Bible (Czech Glagolitic Bible, Emmaus Bible, Bible Vyšebrodská, Bible Emauzská). Purchased in 1766 by Gelasius Dobner, who gave it to the Cistercian monastery in Vyšší Brod, whose abbot gave it in 1799 to the Clementine Library. Microfilms in Zagreb by 1978. Bibliography:	NLP
bible	BibClem		1416	XVII J 17/17	Prague (National Library)				Clementine Fragment of the Czech Glagolitic Bible. Used as the cover of a 1615 Aquis granum (sign. IX B 29 of the National Library) in the Jezuitská kolej pražského Klementina. Discovered by P. Vukadinovič presumably in the 1860s. Acquired by the National Library with the Jesuit collection.	
bible		1416 (about)	1 D c 1/1 (A-D)	Prague (National Museum)	Prague (Emmaus Monastery)	5			Zlomek z knihy Zachariášovy an Ezechielovy. 1 D c 1/1 D published by Pacnerová in 1979. 3 folia discovered by Antonín Schmid in Dobřichovice parish on 25 March 1868 as covers for a Slivenec parish register begun 1618 and a Řevnice parish register. He took them to Prague and showed them to Kolář. Kolář determined 2 of them were Czech Glagolitic (bible fragments) but 1 was 14th century Croatian Glagolitic (a psalter fragment) 1 D c 1/1 B-C published by Kolář in 1870 (first read 21 June 1869 in at the meeting of the kr. české společnosti nauk). The 4th folio is not Glagolitic. Bibliography:	
passional, bible		1416 (about)	1 D c 1/17 (A-D)	Prague (National Museum)	Prague (Emmaus Monastery)	3	31.5 x 20 cm		Zlomky Skutků apoštolských a Leviticu. The part 1 D c 1/17 AB belongs not to the bible but to the Staročesky hlaholský Pasionál a Zlatá legenda alongside fragments 1 D c 1/19 and 1/20. The remaining part is of the Czech Glagolitic Bible (Leviticus 13,1-17). The complete text of the passional has been published in multiple works. Used for the cover of a 1620 Manuál ortelní. Discovered by 1859. Photograph of 1 page in Čermak 2020. Bibliography:	
bible		1416 (about)	1 D c 1/21 (5 sklo)	Prague (National Museum)	Prague (Emmaus Monastery)	1	31.5 x 19 cm		1 Dc 1/21. Glagolitic fragment from the black and white photo folder (Hlaholský zlomek ve složce čb fotografie). It contains the Acts of the Apostles (1,2-28). Acquired by the National Museum through the Hanka collection. A different Glagolitic fragment of the Acts of the Apostles was discovered in 1817 in Hanover but may have been lost, or it may be the same. Bibliography:	
bible	Fg(Bib)Koš	1416	?	Slovak National Library	Czech Republic				Fragment z Košic (Košice fragment).	
bible	Fg(Bib)Spiš (ZSNV)	1416 (about or after)			Prague (Emmaus Monastery)	1	37.3 x 27.5 cm	2 co 37 ro	Zlomok zo Spišskej Novej Vsi (Spiš fragment). Once used as cover of book published in Germany in the 16th century. The original manuscript was probably disassembled after the 1611 destruction of the Emmaus Monastery. Discovered by Štefan Kramár and published 1931. Bibliography: Once lost but a fragment was found and confirmed to belong to it.	
bible		1400s	1 D c 1/29 (1 sklo)	Prague (National Museum)	Prague (Emmaus Monastery)	2	36 x 21.8 cm		Zlomek české hlaholské bible. Used in the cover of a 1618 Copiale aneb formulář rozličných připsání. Discovered by 1912, found in 1942 among the possessions of Adolf Patera.	
bible		1416 (about)	1 D c 1/15	Prague (National Museum)	Prague (Emmaus Monastery)	2	22.5 x 15 cm		Ezekiel Fragment. Acquired by the National Museum from the Václav Hanka collection, who had acquired it by 1861. Jeden perg. list + jeden proužek.	
psalter		1400s (first half)	1 D c 1/22	Prague (National Museum)	Croatia	1	15 x 11.8 cm		Emayzský zlomek chorvatsko-hlaholského žaltáře + Vašicův rukopisný rozbor. Kurz believed it was written in Croatia then brought to Prague, with which Čermak agrees. It is not from the main Emmaus psalter (which is known as the Emayzský breviár̆ni žaltár). The manuscript was discovered during the repair work done at the beginning of January 1952 in the Emmaus Monastery by Karel Siegel. Examined by professor Kadeřavek. Photograph of 1 page in Čermak 2020. Parchment. Bibliography:	
		1400s (first half)	1 D c 1/24	Prague (National Museum)	Croatia/Prague	1 + 1	17.8 x 7.5 cm	1 co 23 ro	Vusímův zlomek hlaholský textu 1. knihy makabejské. Possibly bound into a book in Vienna. Discovered by Jan Vusíin around 1840 in the cover of a legal book in the University Library in Prague. Acquired by Pavel Josef Šafařík. One photograph in Čermak 2020. Bibliography:	
missal		1300s/1400s	1 D c 1/30	Prague (National Museum)	Croatia/Prague	1	22.5 x 17.5 cm	2 co 20 ro	New Prague Glagolitic Fragment. Discovered by Michal Dragoun in February 2016, in a collection of previously unidentified fragments at the National Museum. Photograph of 1 page in Čermak 2020.	
missal		1300s	XVII A 20	Prague (National Library)	Croatia	2	21.5 x 15 cm	2 co 25 ro	Dobrovského zlomek misálu (Univerzitní zlomek, Pyšeliho zlomek). Discovered by Dobrovský by 1790 or 1800 in the cover of an unspecified Greek book. Antonín Pišely transcribed it in 1801. Photograph of part of 1 page in Čermak 2020. Bibliography:	
passional		1300s	1 D c 1/19 (1 sklo; also written 1 Dc 1, č. 19; old Frag. Limelie bibl. vitr. Č. 26)	Prague (National Museum)	Prague (Emmaus Monastery)	1	37 x 21 cm		List z pasionálu. Fragment of the Staročesky hlaholský Pasionál a Zlatá legenda alongside 1 D c 1/20 and 1 D c 1/17 AB. This fragment 1/19 was found by Adolf Patera by 1882 in the library of the Dominican Monastery of St. Jiljí in Prague, having been used as a cover for a book from 1618. It was published first in 1882 then in 1929 and has been published several times since. But part was first published 1897. Bibliography:	
passional		1400s	1 D c 1/20	Prague (National Museum)	Prague (Emmaus Monastery)				Zbytek českého Vidění Mikulášova. Part of the Staročesky hlaholský Pasionál a Zlatá legenda alongside 1 D c 1/19 and 1/17 AB. It was discovered in 1893 by Adolf Patera in the cover of the 1618 Druhá apologie stavů království českého in the library hr. E. Pálffyho in Březnica. It was first published 1958 and 1959 and has been published several times since. Bibliography:	
grant		1419 (July 17)		Arhiv HAZU	Baška	1	12.5 x 27.5 cm	1 co	Juraj Kurnaćin daruje samostanu sv. Spasa zemlju u Bašci. Acquired by Kukuljević, then by JAZU.	
legal		1419 (August 27)	Kukuljevićeva zbirka	Arhiv HAZU	Crikvenica	1	14 x 26.5 cm	1 co	Mate, sin Biersin, daje samostanu sv. Marije u Crikvenici dohodak od svoga trsja i zemlje. Acquired by Kukuljević.	1911
legal		1420 (May 1)			Baška				Ivan Kušević, plovan baški, daruje samostanu sv. Spasa zemlju u Bašci. Acquired by Kukuljević.	
		1420 (July 23)	II. (no sign.)	Trsat (Franjevački samostan)		1			Povelja Pape Martina V. Includes a Glagolitic note.	
missal	MRoč	1420 (about)	Codex slave 4	Austrian National Library	Krbava	232	35.5 x 24 cm		Roč Missal (Ročki misal). Written and illuminated by Bartol Krbavac. Used in Roč from the 15th century to 1593. Microfilms in Zagreb by 1957. Bibliography:	ÖNB, IzSt (2008)
will		1420?	II. 3	Trsat (Franjevački samostan)	Lovran	2			Testament povana iz Lovrana za dobra ostavljena crkvi sv. Ante u istom mjestu. Not the original but a Glagolitic transcription.	
legal		1422 (November 17 or 26)	3.1.7. Pavlinski samostan u Crikvenici, br. 1	HDA	Novi Vinodolski	1	23.5 x 16.5 cm	1 co	Žvan, sin Mateja Bucifala, mienja se za vinograd sa samostanom sv. Marije u Crikvenici. It was in Budapest as M.O.D.L. 37077.	
legal		1423 (February 4)	Kukuljevićeva zbirka	Arhiv HAZU					Sudac Andrija Ševalić daje redovnikom hreljinskom sjenokošu. Survives only in Latinic transcription, acquired by Kukuljević.	
deed		1423 (February 9)	Kukuljevićeva zbirka	Arhiv HAZU	Baška	1			Dragula, nevjesta plovana Kuševića, prodaje zemlju u drazi baškoj samostanu sv. Spasa. Acquired by Kukuljević.	
missal		1425 (or earlier)	Fragm. glag. 5	Arhiv HAZU	Barban	1	35.7 x 24.5 cm	2 co 30 ro	Barban Missal Folio (List barbanskog misala). Includes note by parish priest Urban dated 28 January 1425 in hand that may be different from main hand only by passage of time. Jagić published photograph 1911. Photograph of one page published in Štefanić 1970.	
matricula		1425	Schøyen Collection MS 1391	Oslo (National Library of Norway)	Batomalj	3–7	29 x 21 cm	2 co 26 ro	Statute of Lay Fraternity of the Mother of God of Gorica in Batomalj (Statut bratovštine Majke Božje Goričke u Batomlju, Batomaljski listovi, Matrikula bratovštine sv. Marije na Gorici). (Baška). Oldest surviving Glagolitic lay fraternity statute. First use of the document was by Marko Šorić (1860–1949) of Baška for his chronicle, still in manuscript form until published online by Žubrinić. Found by Vinko Premuda in Draga Bašćanska, and as of Štefanić 1960 not seen since him until identified by Žubrinić as the "Batomaljski listovi". MS 1391 was supposedly acquired by "Predrag Milovanović" of Belgrade in the 20th century, who supposedly sold it to a Mrs. I. Požarić of Zagreb, who sold it in 1991 to Jeremy Griffiths of Oxford, who sold it in the late 1990s to Martin Schøyen, from whose collection it was sold for GBP 12.500 at lot 423 on 10 July 2019 at Christie's to a private collector in the USA. The Salopek folio was acquired by Dalibor Salopek of Zagreb around 1992 from Dragan Manojlović (†2012) and identified on 5 May 2019 by Žubrinić as one of the Batomalj folia. Of the at least 7 folia extant when the manuscript was collected, the locations of only 3 are known, though there are records of 1 in Beograd (possibly sold). It is suspected that Manojlović and Milovanović may have acquired their folia through connections to Joža Horvat (†2012), but his role is only speculative. Bibliography:	2019 [low res.]
legal		1426 (November 17)			Baška				Fra Luka, priur samostana sv. Spasa, zamjenjuje zemlju za zemlju s prvadom Grgurom Kiličićem. Acquired by Kukuljević.	
legal		1428 (January 4)	Pavlinski samostan u Crikvenici, br. 2	HDA	Novi Vinodolski	1	30 x 16+6.5 cm	1 co	Lord Mikula Frankapan Permits the Crikvenica Monastery to Build a Saw in the Crikvenica Valley (Knez Mikula Frankapan dozvoljuje crikveničkim fratrom, da načine pilu u crikveničkoj drazi). Written in same hand as other document from 4 January 1428. Once kept in Budapest as M.O.D.L. 37098. A Latinic transcription attached to a document from 1480 also exists.	
legal		1428 (January 4)		Arhiv HAZU	Novi Vinodolski	1	32.5 x 17+5.5 cm	1 co	Lord Mikula Frankapan Accepts the Request of Bakar Judge Blaž and his Brother Andrew to Serve him as Archers, and Frees them of All Other Obligations as for All Other Archers of Bakar (Knez Mikula Frankapan prihvaća molbu bakarskog suca Blaža i njegova brata Andrije da mu, isto kao njihov otac, služe kao strijelci, te ih oslobađa od svake druge službe kao i sve ostale strijelce iz Bakra). Acquired by Branimir Gusić.	
legal		1428 (January 12)	Isprave pavlinskog samostana u Crikvenici – br. 3	HDA	Brinje	1	40 x 19.5 cm	1 co	Knez Mikula Frankapan potvrdjuje remetam u Crikvenici pravo pobirati trgovinu na obali od Jesenove do Črnina, te zapovieda Bribiranom, da ju i ooni plaćaju. Once kept in Budapest as M.O.D.L. 37099.	
breviary		1400s (beginning)	Fragm. glag. 79	Arhiv HAZU		1	19.5 x 5.7 cm		Komadić lista brevijara.	
breviary		1400s (beginning)	Fragm. glag. 74	Arhiv HAZU		1	22.5 x 13.3 cm		Komad lista brevijara. Acquired by Kukuljević in Croatian/Austrian Primorje.	
missal		1400s (beginning)	Fragm. glag. 38/1	Arhiv HAZU	Dalmatia	1	12 x 14.5 cm		Sitan odlomak misala (Mali odlomak misala). Includes mass of sv. Simeon. The only other codex with that mass is MBrl which notes a connection of the mass of sv. Simeon to Zadar.	
missal		1400s (beginning)	Fragm. glag. 48	Arhiv HAZU		2	24.8 x 18.5 cm	2 co 31 ro	Dvolist misala. Served as wrapping for a book. Acquired by Toma Erdödy who left a note 1609. Parchment.	
breviary	BrHum	1400s (beginning)	R 4067	NSK	Istria	183	30.2 x 19.6 cm	2 co	Humski brevijar (Hum breviary).	NSK, GHR, IzSt
breviary		1400s (beginning)	Fragm. glag. 18	Arhiv HAZU		1	28.5 x 21 cm		List brevijara. Kukuljević obtained it from Fran Kurelac of Rijeka. Photograph in Štefanić 1953.	
breviary		1400s (beginning)	Fragm. glag. 38/o (Kuk. 554)	Arhiv HAZU		4	4 x 3 cm		Četiri sitna ostriška brevijara.	
ritual		1400s (beginning)		Glavotok		1	28 x 19.8 cm	2 co 40 ro	Fragment obrednika: sprovodne molitve. Parchment. Scribe: pop Juraj iz Obrovca (1450).	
breviary		1400s (beginning)	Berčićevo sobranje fragmenata I, 41 (old 67), 42 (old 68)	Petersburg (гос. публ. библиотека)		2		2 co		IzSt (2008; on 578–481)
breviary		1400s (beginning)	Berčićevo sobranje fragmenata I, 3, 4	Petersburg (гос. публ. библиотека)		2 + 1	15.7 x 11.6 cm		Žmanski ostrižak brevijara. Includes Augustine and a newer Glagolitic note of ownership from 1748 by don Šime Milinović. In the 19th century the book it was used as a cover for was owned by Matija Milinov from Ugljan. Acquired by Berčić on Žman 25 August 1866. Contains part of Gospel of Matthew from an older time and a Glagolitic note of ownership from the early 19th century by Matij Milinov of Ugljan.	IzSt (2008; on 544–547)
breviary		1400s (beginning)	Berčićevo sobranje fragmenata I, 44 (old 72)	Petersburg (гос. публ. библиотека)		1	22.1 x 15 cm	2 co 37 ro	Once served as a book cover. Acquired by Berčić in Preko.	IzSt (2008; on 474–475)
breviary		1400s (beginning)	Berčićevo sobranje fragmenata I, 91	Petersburg (гос. публ. библиотека)		1		2 co 36 ro	Contains sv. Avgustin. With note "Bettina. Mazzura" (found in Betina 1861).	IzSt (2008; on 387–388)
breviary		1400s (beginning)	Berčićevo sobranje fragmenata I, 86 (140)	Petersburg (гос. публ. библиотека)		1	27.6 x 12.4 cm	2 co 29 ro	Given to Berčić by Kirinčić of Dobrinj on 7 November 1863.	IzSt (2008; on 397–398)
breviary		1400s (beginning)	Berčićevo sobranje fragmenata I, 113 (old 185)	Petersburg (гос. публ. библиотека)		1	31.3 x 22 cm	2 co 38 ro	List brevijara. Once used as a cover for a different book. Includes a Cyrillic note. Discovered in Bibinje 1864.	IzSt (2008; on 359–360)
breviary		1400s (beginning)	Berčićevo sobranje fragmenata I, 30 (old 30, 49)	Petersburg (гос. публ. библиотека)		1	20.8 x 15 cm	2 co	List brevijara.	IzSt (2008; on 502–503)
		1400s (beginning)	XVII C 20	Prague (National Library)	Prague (Emmaus Monastery)				Hlaholice v díle Mikuláše z Lyry. Latinic but with one Glagolitic word and Glagolitic numbers used to cite Psalms on f. 93r. Discovered by Michal Dragoun. Script matches type in use during the second period of writing of the Czech Glagolitic Bible (around 1416), rather than the earlier script.	
abecedary	AbBein	1400s (early)	Beinecke MS 650	Yale University Library	Austria or Bohemia				Beinecke Glagolitic abecedary. Folio 156 only.	Yale
gradual		1420s	č. 290/zl.	Knihovna Strahovského kláštera	Prague (Emmaus Monastery)	2	22.5 x 18.8 cm	1 co 9 ro (surviving)	Strahovský zlomek hlaholského graduálu. Discovered by Cyril Straka in 1905 in the Strahov Premonstratensian Monastery, where it was being used in the cover of the 1609 printed Astronomia nova of Jan Kepler. Photograph of 1 page in Čermak 2020. Bibliography:	
legal		1430 (June 16)	Isprave pavlinskog samostana u Crikvenici – br. 4	HDA	Brinje	1			Knez Mikula Frankapan dopuštja samostanu sv. Marije u Crikvenici, da načini pilu u crikveničkoj drazi, dajuć mu ujedno i druga s tim spojena prava. Once kept in Budapest as M.O.D.L. 37.100.	
legal		1431 (May 10)	Neoregestrata acta (Fasc. 1650. br. 2)	HDA	Podhumac	1	21.5 x 14 cm		Domša z Vladihović, banovac Dalmacije i Hrvatske, oslobadja Ivaniša Grgurića s njegovimi kmeti od pravomoćja nižih činovnikah. Brought from Hrvatski zemaljski arhiv to Budapest archive where it was kept under sign. 34399. The NSK transcription is R 3358 VII Paper.	
legal		1433 (July 19)		Ljubljana (biblioteka franjevačke provincije Sv. Križa)	Lika	1	23.5 x 15.9 cm	1 co	Privilegij kojim knezovi, vojvoda i suci hrvatskih Vlaha uzimaju pod svoju zaštitu crkvu Sv. Ivana na području Gore u Lici. Glagolitic transcription made in 17th century in Franciscan monastery in Trsat also exists.	
legal		1433 (August 10)	NRA Fasc. 1650 br. 3	HDA	Ozalj				Knez Bartol Frankopan potvrđuje ispravu svog ozaljskog graščaka Matije Dminića kojom su podijeljene neke koristi njegovim kmetovima ozaljskog područja, an osobito Ješkovljanima. Parchment.	
legal		1433 (November 23)		Arhiv HAZU	Draganići	1	18.5 x 29.5 cm	1 co	Odrjan, sin Ivanov, prodaje zemlju Štifanu Biliću i njegovim sinovim. Acquired by Kukuljević. Written in Draganići because the same Odrijan is mentioned in the 1436 document.	1911
confirmation of rights		1433 (after)	Neoregistrata acta (Fasc. 1650. br. 3)	HDA	Ozalj	1	32 x 13 cm	1 co	Knez Bartol Frankapan potvrdjuje list svoga ozaljskoga grašćaka, kojim su podieljene njeke koristi njegovim kmetom ozaljskoga vladanja, a po imenu Ježkovljanom. Was located in Budapest under D.M.D.L. 34340. Despite its written date 10 August 1433, Ivšić determined it to be a falsificate written in a younger script.	
legal		1434 (April)			Buže				Juraj Sultić gives power of attorney to relatives and others. Acquired by Kukuljević.	
abecedary	AbH (HAbc)	1434	XI A 14	Prague (National Library)	Prague				Hrnčířova abeceda. A Glagolitic abecedary in a Latin codex on f. 242v. Connected with the scribes of the Slavonic Monastery of Saint Jerome and not as previously thought with the Divišova abeceda. The manuscript was purchased by Ondřej Hrnčíř in 1434, who was still the owner in 1436. Hrnčíř wrote the Glagolitic abecedary while a refugee from the Hussites during his 1432–1436 stay at Kost. Facsimile in Čermak 2020.	NLP
missal	MVat_{8}	1435	Borgiano illirico 8	Vatican Library	Obrovac (vicinity)	288	24 x 17 cm	2 co x 30 ro	Vatikanski misal Illirico 8 (Vatican missal Illirico 8). Written by a priest named Marko for a priest named Blaž. Manuscript located in Dobrinj in 1558. Microfilm in Zagreb by 1952. Bibliography:	IzSt (2008)
legal		1436		Arhiv HAZU	Draganići	1	25.5 x 16 cm	1 co	Odjan, sin Ivančačev, iz Draganića prodaje dvie zemlje Kušeti Štefaniću. Acquired by Kukuljević.	
legal		1437 (May 3)	sv. 1650, br. 4	HDA	Ozalj				Knez Bartol Frankapan naznačuje Ozaljskim purgarom žirovno izpasišće uz kmete svoje u Mirkovu polju. Survives only in Latinic transliteration. Though Lopašić stated that the Glagolitic original was housed at the obćina in Trg (Ozalj), it has not been found there; in Trg there is only a 17th-century Latinic transcription. The Croatian State Archives possesses a second 17th century Latinic transcription, acquired from the Budapest archive (M.O.D.L. 34.341), acquired from the Hrvatski zemaljski arhiv.	
legal		1436 (May 12)			Otočac				Survives only in Latinic transcription dated 1481.	
legal		1437 (July 15)			Zadar				Oporuka popa Jurja Zubine. Acquired by Ivan Brčić.	
		1438–1716		?	Omišalj				Knjiga bratovštine sv. Marije velike. Lost, but it existed on the testimony of Akti procesa izmeđy omišaljske općine of the 18th century.	
		1439–1688	IV b 93	Arhiv HAZU	Trsat	89	27.2 x 20.4 cm		Knjiga bratovštine sv. Jurja na Trsatu. Glagolitic to 1599 then Latinic then Italian. Not chronological. There is a Glagolitic entry from 1439 followed chronologically by a 1530 Italian note on f. 7v (likely a later transcription however), but with regular Glagolitic use beginning in 1566. Microfilm in Zagreb by 1952. One photograph in Štefanić 1970.	
legal		1439 (July 28)	Strohal br. 3	Zagreb (Kr. zemaljski arhiv)					Knez Štefan Frankopan uzvisuje svoga vjernoga slugu Frana Batišića na čast vlastelina. Last seen 1910 as of 1983. It was the only legal document on Strohal's list that remained missing.	
legal		1440 (March 15)	Pavlinski samostan u Crikvenici, br. 5	HDA	Hreljin	1	26 x 16 cm	1 co	Knez Ivan Frankapan daruje zemlju samostanu sv. Marije u Crikvenici. Once housed in Budapest under sg. M.O.D.L. 37101. An old Latinic transcription also exists.	
deed		1440	Mažuranićeva zbirka	Arhiv HAZU	Bribir	1	14.5 x 10 cm	1 co	Deed of Matij Doklinić. Acquired in Bribir by principal Antun Mažuranić of the gymnasium in Rijeka. Acquired by Antun Mažuranić, who noted it was found in Bribir.	
breviary	BrMet	1442	MR_{161} (MR 161)	Metropolitan Library of the Roman Catholic Archdiocese of Zagreb	Croatia	469	19.5 x 13 cm	2 co x 27 ro	Brevijar Metropolitanski knjižnice (Breviary of the Metropolitan library). Bibliography:	NSK, GHR, IzSt (2008)
breviary	BrMsc (BrMosk)	1442–1443 (about)	Sevastjanov collection (F.270. II) No. 51A+B	Russian State Library	Lika	245+250			Moskovski brevijar (Moscow breviary). Kept in Vrbnik in 1481 and 1533, sent to Rome about 1627, where it was used by M. Karaman and M. Sović and where it remained until the end of the 18th century. Vatroslav Jagić found it in or brought it to Moscow in 1864. Cronia disputes that the Moscow breviary is the same as the one used in Rome, considering that one lost. Black and white photocopy by 1977 (Star. inst. F 34). Bibliography:	STSL A, STSL B
abecedary	AbM (MAbc)	1442	Prague Metropolitan Chapter Collection, M 125	Prague (Archiv Pražského hradu)	Prague	192	22 x 14.8 cm		Latin with Glagolitic abecedary. One of three such abecedaries in Prague. Inside of a Latin manuscript of Consolatio philosophoae. Facsimile in Čermak 2022. Bibliography:	
miscellany	CRad	1444–1461	Borgiano illirico 12	Vatican Library	Bosnia	60			Miscellany of Krstjanin Radosav (Zbornik Krstjanina Radosava, Radosavljev zbornik). Cyrillic but with Glagolitic abecedary below Očenaš (f. 56–57) and copyist's note on 59r, repeated by a different writer. Bibliography:	DVL, IzSt (2015), IzSt (2008)
legal		1444 (August 11)	monastery of sv. Jelena kod Senja collection br. 4	HDA	Otočac	1	31 x 12 cm	1 co	Knez Žigmunt Frankapan daruje samostanu sv. Jelene kod Senja zapušteno mlinište na Švici. Once housed in Budapest under sg. M.O.D.L. 35580.	
mirror	SpVat	1445	Borgiano illirico 9	Vatican Library	Vrbnik	95	14 x 10.5 cm	2 co	Zrcalo vrbničko (Vrbnik mirror, Specchio). Scribe: žakan Luka. Received by the Vatican in 1772. Transferred by Pope Leo XIII to the Vatican Library in 1900. Microfilms in Zagreb by 1952. Bibliography:	DVL, NSK, IzSt (2008)
legal		1445 (January 21)			Bakar				Oporuka pope Tome Partinića. Survives only in Latinic transcription. Acquired by Kukuljević.	
confirmation of privilegium		1445 (October 28)	Pavlinski samostan u Crikvenici, br. 9	HDA	Novi Vinodolski	1	29 x 22 cm	1 co	Knez Martin Frankapan potvrđuje privilegije koje su pavlinskom samostanu Sv. Marije u Crikvenici dali njegovi pretci, an osobito njegov otac knez Mikula Frankapan. Once housed in Budapest under sg. M.O.D.L. 37107.	
legal		1445 (November 8)	Kukuljević collection I, Gl. II. 12	Arhiv HAZU	Senj	1	19.5 x 13 cm	1 co	Knez Dujam Frankapan dopuštja samostanu sv. Jelene, da može mljeti na Žrnovnici bez ujamka. Acquired by Kukuljević.	
deed		1445	XI. 16	Trsat (Franjevački samostan)					Potvrda od Kaptola Timenutis u vezi s dobrima prodanim poštovanom Jakovu Banovcu od drugog dana po Sv. Jurju. Includes a two word Glagolitic note on the outer side.	
legal		1446 (December 10)	Pavlinski samostan u Novome, sv. 1. br. 1	HDA	Novi Vinodolski	1	24.5 x 19 cm	1 co	Knez Martin Frankapan potvrdjuje oporuku župana Mihovila, kojom ovaj svoje imanje ostavlja crkvi sv. Marije u Novom.	
acceptance		1447 (March 7)	Pavlinski samostan u Crikvenici, br. 6	HDA	Crikvenica	1	23 x 13 cm	1 co	Remete u Crikvenici primaju u bratstvo svoga reda Štefana, sina Dokšina, i njegovu djecu. Once housed in Budapest under sg. M.O.D.L. 37103.	
legal		1447 (April 17)	samostan sv. Jelene collection, br. 6	HDA	Senj	1	27.5 x 16 cm	1 co	Knez Dujam Frankapan daruje sjenokošu samostanu sv. Jelene blizu Senja. Once housed in Budapest under sg. M.O.D.L. 35587.	
legal		1447 (May 1)	Samuel Keglević collection	Arhiv HAZU	Ripač	1	31.5 x 22.5 cm	1 co	Pleme Nebljusko privoljuje pred krbavskim knezom Tomašem, da može Gašparov sin Mikula u zaklad uzeti zemlju sudca Dujma Vučića. It was housed in Lobor in the archive of Samuil Keglević. A note from a second hand is on the reverse.	
legal		1447 (December 4)	Crikvenički samostan collection, br. 8	HDA	Novi Vinodolski	1	27 x 10 cm	1 co	Martin Frankapan daruje zemlju crkvi sv. Marije u Crikvenici. Once housed in Budapest under sg. M.O.D.L. 37104.	
legal		1448 (November 28)	Samuel Keglević collecion	Arhiv HAZU	Rmanj				Juraj Karlović iz Strižićah prodaje pred stolom lapačkim svoju plemenštinu Mikuli, sinu Gašparovu.	
judgement		1449 (December 1)		Arhiv HAZU	Belgrad (Vinodol)				Upravitelji knezova Frankapana zajedno sa sucima, plovanima i satnicima donose presudu u korist Grižanaca i Belgradaca vezano uz njihov spor s Driveničanima. Original in Grižane lost but copy, first mentioned in a Grižane list dated 1620, was contemporary with original. The Arhiv HAZU also has a younger Glagolitic copy from 1583 by priest Luka Mavrić. Two later Latinic copies also exist.	
breviary, hymnal		1449	XVI G 27 (3749)	Prague (National Museum)	Prague	260	9 x 6.5 cm		Latin with Glagolitic note on f. 210'. From the library of Ant. Burd. Parchment.	
miscellany	CBel	1400s (second quarter)	No 42 (Крушедол Ж.V.85)	MSPC-Beograd	Serbia	318			Mixed Cyrillic-Glagolitic paratext on protective folio ("pop David ot Belgrad").	
miscellany		1400s (beginning or first half)	III a 15 (Kuk. 351)	Arhiv HAZU		65	17.5 x 13.3 cm	2 co	Vinodolski zbornik. Scribes: hand A f. 1-16 and maybe 39–47, hand B f. 17-25v, alternating A and B f. 27–30, hand C f. 48–49, 61–62, hand D f. 50–60, possible hand alternating with D f. 31–36, hand E f. 62v-64 and maybe elsewhere. All hands worked in the same period and place. Written on Čakavian-Kajkavian border. Includes many historically significant notes. In the 15th century through the beginning of the 17th century it was in Vinodol, then in Dobrinj and Vrbnik. Acquired by Kukuljević in Vrbnik. Kukuljević loaned it to Šafarik for a time. Acquired by JAZU with Šafarik library. Bibliography:	IzSt (2008)
missal	Fg(M)Var_{1}	1400s (by first half)		Varaždin (Capuchin Monastery)		2	28 x 18.7 cm	2 co 33 ro	First Varaždin Fragment (Prvi varaždinski fragment). The monastery it was found in was founded on the 25 April 1701. At one point it was owned by Petro Czuetkj, who gave it to a certain Casimir. Separated in 1986 by Anica Nazor from cover of IX c. 5 (a book printed 1712), which had been known to brother Bono Zvonimir Šagi who had shown it to Anica Vlašić-Anić in 1984.	
breviary	BrVb_{3}	1400s (first half)	n/a	Vrbnik parish library	Vrbnik	299	37.5 x 27.5 cm	2 co x 27 ro	Treći vrbnički brevijar (Third Vrbnik breviary). In Vrbnik at least since 1471. Microfilm by 1952 for JAZU, photocopy by 1977 for Star. inst. (F 41).	IzSt (2011 from 2010 scan to CD by ArhivPRO)
breviary		1400s (first half)	Fragm. glag. 101/a-r	Arhiv HAZU		17	29.5 x 20.5 cm	2 co 33 ro	Kirčevi odlomci brevijara. All belonged to same codex.	
missal	Fg(M)Drg_{2}	1400s (first half)		Državni Arhiv in Rijeka					Second Draguć Missal Fragment (Drugi dragućki fragment misala). Described by Štefanić in Glagoljski notarski protokol u Draguću u Istri, "Radovi Staroslavenskog instituta" 1 (1952).	
breviary		1400s (first half)		Trsat (Franjevački samostan)	Vinodol				Trsatski fragment brevijara. Discovered by Milan Mihaljević.	
breviary		1400s (first half)	Fragm. glag. 29/b-m	Arhiv HAZU		12			Dvanaest ostrižaka brevijara. Acquired by Kukuljević from the cover of a 1648 printed Levakovićev Misal.	
miscellany	Fg(C)Paul, Fg(C)Nicod	1400s (first half)	Fragm. glag. 32/b-c	Arhiv HAZU		4	21.6 x 16.5 cm, 20.5 x 14.7 cm		Četiri lista zbornika. In some sources, part of 32/c and 90 g-h are cited as belonging together. The ikavisms and instrumental in -ov point to an area between Zadar, Krbava and Vinodol. Acquired by Kukuljević from the lords Fanfogna in Zadar. Photocopies and microfilms existed in Zagreb by 1977. Bibliography:	IzSt (2008), IzSt (2008)
miscellany		1400s (first half)	Fragm. glag. 36	Arhiv HAZU		1	8.7 x 24.8 cm		Ostrižak zbornika. Text is closer to Ivančićev zbornik than to Kolunićev. Acquired by Kukuljević in Porta on Krk.	
missal		1400s (first half)	IV	Krk (arhiv samostana trećoredaca)	Krk	1	18 x 14 cm		List misala. Parchment.	
missal	MBrb (MBrib)	1400s (first half)	III b 3	Arhiv HAZU	Western Croatia?	103	18 x 25 cm		Bribirski misal (Bribir missal). Includes younger note Kušah pero kako piše. Written by several hands from the same school: hand A (f. 1–16), hand B (f. 17–33), hand C (f. 34–36), hand D (f. 37–57), hand F (f. 78–103) with uncertainties for hand on f. 92–96, 97–103. The name of scribe D was Juraj (f. 51d). From the 16th century on, it was used in Bribir, where it stayed until Ivan Kukuljević Sakcinski moved it to Zagreb, purchased by JAZU in 1868. The earliest dated note in Bribir is from 3 January 1566 (f. 55). Nikola Tolentinski was pronounced a saint in 1447 but the name was entered by a hand in perhaps the first half of the 16th century. Language includes many ekavisms. 3 saints are characteristic of Istria but without sufficient attention to counteract the weight of the argument for a more western origin on the grounds of 5 Hungarian/Czech saints (though Emerik is surprisingly missing). There are 4 Dalmatian saints but Dunat and Ivan Trogirski and Zoil zadarski are missing. Parchment. One photograph in Štefanić 1970. Bibliography:	IzSt (2008)
missal		1400s (first half)	III b 2 (Kuk. 328)	Arhiv HAZU		8	25 x 17 cm	2 co 31 ro	Kvaterna misala. Includes Proprium de tempore. Very similar to III b 3 but not from that codex. The 8 November 1321 grant was once together with it, removed by Kukuljević.	
breviary		1400s (first half)		Krk (arhiv bivšeg Staroslavenskog instituta)		2	21.8 x 8 cm	2 co 33 ro	Dvolist brevijara. Includes Proprium de tempore with Ecclesiastes 3:2-7:18. Originally at Drivenik, acquired by an archive in Fužina, brought from mainland to Krk. On f. 1 there is a marginal note in Latinic about Zvane Felice Gerlici (who became captain of Bakar in 1741).	1996 (2006)
breviary		1400s (first half)	Fragm. glag. 37/b	Arhiv HAZU		2	22.7 x 16.4 cm	2 co	Dvolist brevijara. Once part of the Capuchin monastery library in Rijeka.	
breviary		1400s (first half)	Fragm. glag. 38/d	Arhiv HAZU		1	23 x 14 cm	2 co	Komad lista brevijara. Acquired by Kukuljević in Dalmatia. Parchment.	
breviary		1400s (first half)	Fragm. glag. 38/n	Arhiv HAZU		5	7.5 x 5 cm		Pet sitnih ostrižaka brevijara. May not all be from same codex. Acquired by Kukuljević in Kotor from the Monastir fratarski sv. Klare.	
breviary		1400s (first half)	Fragm. glag. 128	Arhiv HAZU		1	25.7 x 18 cm	2 co	List brevijara. Includes note by the Juraj Feretić who was accepted into the Vrbnik clergy 1719, whose father was from Dobrinj, still mentioned in 1765. Once cover of Krćanski nauk (sign. VII 163) written by žakan Mikula Lukarić of Dobrinj in 1723 acquired by JAZU in 1959 from the remains of Jerko Gršković in Vrbnik. Hand identical to that of Fragm. glag. 129. Parchment.	
breviary		1400s (first half)	Fragm. glag. 129	Arhiv HAZU		1	23 x 17 cm	2 co	List brevijara. Hand same as that of Fragm. glag. 128, once part of the same codex. Acquired by JAZU in 1959 from the remains of Jerko Gršković in Vrbnik.	
missal		1400s (first half)	Fragm. glag. 24/a-b	Arhiv HAZU		1	26 x 21 cm		Two fragments of one missal folio (Dva odlomaka jednog lista misala). Once used as a cover for a book in the library of the Capuchin Monastery of Rijeka. Acquired by Kukuljević. Bibliography:	
missal		1400s (first half)	Fragm. glag. 25/d	Arhiv HAZU		1	18.5 x 4.5 cm		Ostrižak misala.	
missal		1400s (first half)	Fragm. glag. 29 a	Arhiv HAZU		1	19.5 x 4 cm		Ostrižak misala. Once used to strengthen the spine of a copy of the 1648 Levakovićev Brevijar.	
missal		1400s (first half)	Fragm. glag. 30/a-b	Arhiv HAZU		2	16.7 x 19.3 cm, 20.8 x 16.5 cm	2 co	Dva krnja lista misala. One Latinic note mentions a pop Trinajstich. Another Latinic note mentions a Zuane Stassich vicar of S. Francis in Krk. Acquired by Kukuljević on Krk. Parchment.	
missal		1400s (first half)	Fragm. glag. 121	Arhiv HAZU		2	25.7 x 16.3 cm		Krnji dvolist misala. Includes Proprium de tempore. Once a cover of a copy of Karstjanski nauk sign. VII 115, separated in 1959.	
		1400s (first half)	R 6635	NSK		43			Teološki priručnik župnika glagoljaša (Manipulus curatorum, Odlomak Legende o mučenju sv. Jurja). Once part of Thomas Phillipps collection. Purchased at a London auction in 1976 by NSK, from the Thomas Phillips collection. Bibliography:	IzSt (2008)
legal		1450 (February 16)	Kukuljević collection	Arhiv HAZU	Baška	1		1 co	Mirša Majšićević sells part of vineyard to the monastery of sv. Spas. Acquired by Kukuljević. Alongside the original there is a 16th-century copy. Includes the first known full title of a kancelar and notar carskom oblašću for scribe priest Matko son of Vid.	
legal		1450 (April 16)			"s' stomorina sela"				Oporuka popa Petra Poletčića. Acquired by Ivan Berčić.	
legal		1450 (October 26)	Pavlinski samostan u Crikvenici, br. 8	HDA	Novi Vinodolski	1	22 x 12 cm, 23.5 x 21.5 cm	1 co	Knez Martin Frankapan zapovieda, da Markovići služe kao i ostali kmeti samostana sv. Marije u Crikvenici. Parchment and paper glued together already in 15th century. Possible falsificate from the 15th century. Once housed in Budapest under sg. M.O.D.L. 37106. Paper.	
philosophy		1450–1452	Knihovna pražské metropolitní kapituly, M 40/2	Prague (Archiv Pr. Hr.)	Prague (Emmaus Monastery)	316	21.8 x 15.7 cm		Latin with one Glagolitic note from 1450 and a part Glagolitic part Latin note by an inexperienced hand from 1452. The notes are on f. 157r (1450) and 112r (1452). First noted by Podlaha 1922. Bibliography:	
ritual		1451	R 4028 or R 4026	NSK	Croatia	16	20.4 x 16 cm	2 co	Glagoljski obrednik.	NSK
legal		1451 (September 2)		Arhiv HAZU	Senj	1	30 x 18.5 cm	1 co	Fratri samostana sv. Spasa zamjenjuju svoj vrt za drugo zemljište. Acquired by Kukuljević.	
legal		1451 (October 25)	Samuel Keglević collection	Arhiv HAZU	Knin	1	41.5 x 22.5 cm	1 co	Stol tninski rešava parnu Marka Deaniševića i Jurja Henčića iz Srba, pošto su se ova dvojica prije toga prela pred sudom srbskim. Acquired by HAZU with the purchase of the archive of Samuel Keglević.	
legal		1451		archive of Samuil Keglević in Lobor	Rmanj	1	24.5 x 13.5 cm	1 co	Stol varoša rmanjskoga dopituje zastavu Jagnjinu sinu Petru. Original once in archive of Samuil Keglević, still extant around 1911, now lost.	1911
grant		1452 (May 8)		Krk (biskupski arhiv)	Otočac	1	26.5 x 18.2 cm	1 co	Knez Žigmunt Frankapan daruje pavlinskom samostanu Sv. Spasa kod Senja jedno mlinište na Švici.	
grant		1452 (November 4)			Ozalj	1	35.5 x 8 cm	1 co	Knez Mikula Frankapan dopušta trškomu popu Ivanu i njegovom bratu, te žaknu Luki izgradnju i vlasništvo nad dva mlina u drazi pod Ozljem. Original was kept in Trg by Ozalj in the archive of the zemljišna zajednica.	
legal		1453 (April 31)	N. N. Muzeum Gr. Blagay cs. leveltara	Budapest (archive of National Museum)	Brumno		35 x 15.5 cm	1 co	Grgur knez Blagajski odredjuje prava i dužnosti svojih podložnikah. A transcription was first published by Gjuragj Kobe in Danica 1841, br. 5. Once belonged to library of Ignacije Blagajski in Boštanj (Weissenstein).	
permit		1453 (October 15)	II. 17	Trsat (Franjevački samostan)		2			Isprava Martina Frankopana kojom dopušta dolazak svakom vjerniku u crkvu Djevice Marije da se slobodno pričešćuje i posvećuje.	
deed		1454		Vrbnik (župni arhiv)	Visoče (Lovran)	1	20 x 11.5 cm	1 co	Valentin, sin Ivana Kikabonića iz sela Visoče kupuje vinograd od Mavra Mikšića za 20 libara. Once belonged to priest Mate Volarić.	
legal		1455 (May 15)			Bakar				Razvod medjah medju Bakrani, Grobničani i Trsatjanani. Survives only in Latin transcription. Acquired by Kukuljević in Grobnik.	
legal		1455 (October 28)	Crikvenički samostan collection, br. 9	HDA	Novi Vinodolski	1	29 x 22 cm	1 co	Knez Martin Frankapan potvrdjuje liste svojih predjah, dane samostanu sv. Marije u Crikvenici. Scribe: parish priest Grgur. Once housed in Budapest under sg. M.O.D.L. 37107. Parchment.	
missal	MVb_{1}	1456	n/a	Vrbnik parish library	Senj	256	28.7 x 22 cm	2 co x 29 ro	Prvi vrbnički misal (First Vrbnik missal). Written by the priest and vicar Thomas, Archdeacon of Senj. Parchment. Bibliography:	IzSt (3 May 2011), IzSt (2008)
		1456	F.п.I.48	RNB-Sankt-Peterburg	Russia	255			Пролог, dated to 1431–1435, Cyrillic but with Glagolitic employed cryptographically alongside Greek and Cyrillic in 1456 note.	
legal		1457 (July 10)			Modruš				Knez Štefan Frankapan daruje Martinu Oštreheriću više pravah i posjedovanjah. Published by Georgije I. Petrović in Cyrillic transcription in volume 4 of Novi Serbski Lětopis za god. 1841 in addition to a small photograph. Abridged transcription acquired by Kukuljević collection as br. 65. Original lost as of Ivšić.	first 4 rows: 1841
legal		1457 (November 26)	No 6644	Graz (Štajerski zemaljski arhiv)	Modruš	1	26.3 x 13.5 cm	1 co	Knez Štefan III Frankapan oslobađa grobničkoga potknežina Žigmunda i njegove nasljednike, zbog njegove vjerne i dugogodišnje službe, od svih dužnosti i podavanja od kuće i vrta koje posjeduje u Grobniku.	
legal		1458 (September 5)	Pavlinski samostan u Crikvenici, br. 10	HDA		1	34 x 17.5 cm	1 co	Martin Frankapan oslobadja mlin Jurše Ričanina pod Trsatom od svakoga tereta. A transcription on paper also exists, possibly also from the 15th century. Both original and contemporary (15th century) copy survive. Housed at the Crikvenica monastery after the Franciscans purchased Jurša's mill. Once housed in Budapest under sg. M.O.D.L. 37108. Parchment.	
breviary	BrN_{1}	1459	n/a, ?, Glagolitica I-1	Novi Vinodolski parish library, Arhiv HAZU, HDA	Novi Vinodolski	462+5+6	36 x 28 cm		Prvi novljanski brevijar (First Novi breviary). The first half, to folio 374, was written by a scribe named Juraj (who wrote the postscript dating the codex to 1459), and the rest was written by a different hand. It was written for the church of Saints Cosmas and Damian in Novi Vinodolski, in Novi Vinodolski, on the order of Jakov Potočnjak and others. 6 folia in HDA belong to its calendar. Arhiv HAZU has 5 folia. In 1835 the HDA fragment belonged to Antun Mažuranić, later given by Portuguese-Brazilian ambassador in Zagreb Aleksandar Eherman to HDA in 1945. Arhiv HAZU fragments also once part of Antun and Ivan Mažuranić library. Microfilm by 1952 at JAZU.	IzSt (HDA: 2008)
breviary		1459	Fragm. glag. 97	Arhiv HAZU		5	36 x 28 cm	2 co 37 ro	Pet listova I Novljanskog brevijara. Includes notes. Once stood at the end of BrN_{1}. Acquired by Ivan Mažuranić (1814–1890), given to JAZU around 1911 by his son Vladimir. Photocopies in Zagreb from 1982 on.	IzSt (2008)
breviary		1459	Fragm. glag. 95	Arhiv HAZU		2	35.5 x 24 cm	2 co 40 ro	Dva lista I Novljanskog brevijara. Folio A followed f. 460 and folio B followed f. 466 of BrN_{1}. Acquired by Ivan Mažuranić, given to JAZU around 1911 by his son Vladimir. Photocopies in Zagreb from 1982 on.	IzSt (2008)
legal		1459 (June 28)	Samuil Keglević collection	Arhiv HAZU	Draganići		30 x 15.5 cm	1 co	Kuše Emrihović prodaje sa svojom bratjom njivu Kušeti Štefaniću. Vide Miličić prodaje njivu Kušeti Štefaniću. Petar Agnežić prodaju zemlju Kušeti Štefaniću.	
breviary	BrMav	1460	R 7822 (RI-16º-1a)	NSK	Vrbnik, Konavle	417	16 x 11.7 cm	2 co x 30 ro	Breviary of priest Mavro (Mavrov brevijar, Brevijar popa Mavra). Written by deacon Blaž Baromić for priest Mavro of Vrbnik, and finished by a priest named Jure from Baška. Mavro took the breviary with him to Konavle. The codex was in the hands of the Pezzoli family in Rome until 1981, when it was purchased by its current owners. Microfilm made in 1984 (Star. inst. M 175, HDA G-165 (ZM 73/6)). Formerly housed in Rome by the family U. Pezzoli. Bibliography:	NSK, GHR, IzSt (2008)
legal		1460 (January 12)			Sustipan				Oporuka dom Petra Kršavića. Acquired by Ivan Brčić.	
legal		1460 (June 25)	Crikvenički samostan collection, br. 11	HDA	Novi Vinodolski	1	40 x 32 cm	1 co	Knez Martin Frankapan daruje dva vinograda crkvi sv. Marije u Crikvenici. Once housed at Budimpest under sg. M.O.D.L. 37109. Parchment.	
legal		1460 (November 12)			Bag				Don Mihović, sin Jurja Sultića iz Gvozdnice, dobiva od suda njeko mirišće i vrt, ostavštinu svoga ujaka Don Tomaša. Acquired by Kukuljević.	
legal		1460		HDA	Steničnjak				Knez Martin II. Frankapan oslobađa od svih poreskih obveza Tomaša, sina suca Ilije iz Slata i njegove potomke. B. Jurišić in 1961 believed it was written between June and November. Parchment.	
legal		1461 (March 26)	Samostan sv. Jelene kod Senja collection, br. 7	HDA	Jelovik	1	30 x 15 cm		Kneginja Jelža Frankapanka daruje sjenokošu remetam samostana sv. Jelene kod Senja. Once housed at Budapest under sg. M.O.D.L. 35631.	
legal		1461 (June 5)			Bosiljevo				Matko Grebčić, župnik gojmerski, daruje jedno selo crkvi sv. Mikule na Gvozdu. Only Latinic transcription survives. Acquired by Kukuljević.	
absolution		1461 (August 25)	Samostan Sv. Nikole collection	Državni arhiv Zadar	Knin	1	33.5 x 21.5 cm	1 co	Kninski biskup Franjo Špirančić podjeljuje oprost od sto dana vjernicima koji pruže potporu u žitu i vinu samostanu klarisa Sv. Nikole u Zadru.	
legal		1461–1470							Pismo modruškoga biskupa Mikule, kojim brani porabu slavenskoga jezika u službi božjoj. Acquired by Ivan Berčić.	
legal		1461	Arhivi raznih pavlinskih samostana (Claustra diversa), br. 4	HDA					Included a Glagolitic regest note.	
missal	MVb_{2}	1462	n/a	Vrbnik parish library (with one leaf in Princeton, New Jersey)	Vrbnik	286	30 x 22.5 cm	2 co	Drugi vrbnički misal. The Princeton fragment of this missal was discovered by James O'Brien in the Firestone library of the University of Princeton, who announced the discovery in Zagreb at the Metodijev međunarodni znastveni skup of 1985. Bibliography:	IzSt (by ArhivPRO), IzSt (2008), IzSt (Princeton)
psalter with commentary	PsFr	1463	Cod. Slav. 77	Austrian National Library	Lindari, Istria	132	20 x 13.5 cm		Fraščićev psaltir (Fraščić psalter, Psalterium Vindobonense). Written by a priest named Fraščić. The commentary is of Byzantine type. Microfilm in Zagreb by 1952. Bibliography:	ÖNB, ÖNB, NSK, GHR
deed		1463 (April 24)		Arhiv HAZU	Senj	1	37 x 16 cm	1 co	Knez Martin II Frankapan prodaje bakarskomu sucu Brozu neku kuću, vrt, vodu i jednu njivu. Acquired by Branimir Gušić of Zagreb.	
legal		1463 (August 4)			Modruš				Apaj Liković načinja se s modruškim kaptolom za njeke dužnosti, što ih je imao prama crkvi stoga kaptola i prama crkvi sv. Mikule na Gvozdu. Survives only in Latinic transcription, acquired by Kukuljević.	
legal		1464 (March 21)	Novljanski samostan collection, sv. 1. br. 5	HDA	Novi Vinodolski.	1	29.5 x 18 cm	1 co	Knez Martin Frankapan dopuštja Filipu Sokoliću, da može mlin načiniti na svojoj zemlji. Once housed at Budapest under sg. M.O.D.L. 37110.	
legal		1464 (August 9)							Knez Žigmunt Frankapan daruje samostanu sv. Mikule na Gvozdu njeka posjedovanja i prava, da tim nadomjesti darovanje viteza Karla. Only Latinic transcription survives, acquired by Kukuljević.	
breviary	BrVat_{19}	1465	Vat. Slav. 19 (illirico 19)	Vatican Library	Croatia	3+384	16.5-17 x 11.5 cm		Vatikanski brevijar Vat. Slav. 19 (Vatican breviary Vat. Slav. 19). Discovered late because it was in a Latin collection. Entered the Vatican Library in 1780. Photocopy by 1977 and microfilm by 1978 (Star. inst. F 38, M 6). Bibliography:	DVL, IzSt (2008)
legal		1465 (June 4)			Lipnik (Croatia)				Martin Malović kupuje jedno selo, i od toga sela prodaje komad purgarom ozaljskim. Latinic V. Babukić photographed the original and published a Latinic transcription in Danica 1840 br. 48.	
grant		1465 (December 9)		Arhiv HAZU	Novi Vinodolski	1	24 x 13 cm	1 co	Knez Martin II. Frankapan daruje Jurju Repaliću neki vinograd u Pregradi.	
legal		1466 (March 5)	Novljanski samostan collection, sv. 1. br. 6	HDA	Senj	1	21.5 x 17 cm	1 co	Knezovi Frankapani, Štefan, Dujam, Martin, Juraj, Bartol, Anž i Mikula, potvrdjuju remetam sv. Jelene i sv. Spasa mline i zemljišta. A Latin transcription was also made, on 5 March 1660. Once housed in Budapest under sg. M.O.D.L. 37105. There is also an old Latinic transcription and a Latin translation.	1901
legal		1466 (April 14)		Arhiv HAZU	Krk (town)				Mikula, krčki biskup, potvrdjuje fratrom crkve sv. Spasa crkvu sv. Kuzme i Damjana, koju im je knez Ivan Frankapan sagradio i obilno nadario; ujedno ih oslobadja od njekih teretah. Acquired by Kukuljević. Bibliography:	
legal		1466 (April 22)		Zadar (Ivan Berčić library)	Ugljan (town)				Oporuka Tomana Matešića, kapelana ugljanskoga. Acquired by Ivan Berčić. Last seen in Zadar as of Ivšić.	
miscellany	CPet	1468	R 4001	NSK	Croatia	350	20 x 13.5 cm		Petris Miscellany (Petrisov zbornik). Bought by NSK between 1960 and 1970 from the Petris Monastery of Krk. Paper. Bibliography:	NSK, GHR, IzSt (2008)
legal		1468 (April 11)	Crikvenički samostan collection br. 12	HDA	Novi Vinodolski	1	26 x 12 cm	1 co	Knez Martin Frankapan daruje crkvi sv. Marije na Crikvenici jednoga vlaha imenom Mikulu. A Latinic transcription also exists. Once housed in Budapest under sg. M.O.D.L. 37111. Parchment.	
legal		1469 (March 16)	Samuil Keglević collection	Arhiv HAZU	Čovka				Knez Juraj Špirančić obećaje, da neće progoniti onoga, u koga je našasto nješto njegova blaga.	
confirmation		1469 (September 9)		Ljubljana (knjižnica franjevačke provincije Sv. Križa)	Lika	1	31.7 x 13 cm	1 co	Knez Juraj Tomašić i suci kraljevskog stola u Lici potvrđuju vjerodostojnost oporuke plemića Matijca Utištenića.	
breviary	BrBrb (BrBrib)	1470 (September–October)	III b 6 (Kuk 2)	Arhiv HAZU	Vinodol, Croatia	199	26 x 19 cm	2 co 33 ro	Bribirski brevijar (Bribir breviary). Written by a single hand including dates 7 September and 10 October 1470 in the temporal. Name of scribe unknown but near Hoteš (near Bužan in the Buška župa), perhaps written for the crkva sv. Marije there. There is a note about the marriage of Ferenc Berislavić and Barbara daughter of Sigismund Frankopan that must have been written 1493 but it is unknown whether in Buže or in Gacka (where Barbara had property) or Modruše. The codex ended up in Modruš as attested by a note To je brv(ija)l modriški where there was also a crkva sv. Marije. From 1548 there is a note about the death of Margareta of Poduljin, a village near Bribir. All later notes reference surnames of Bribir. Includes a child's drawings (i.e. f. 4v, 40v, 157v) and writing practice, including by Mikula Draganić, Mikula Šušić, Mikula Ugrin, Mikula Ivanov. Obtained by Ivan Kukuljević Sakcinski in Bribir. Kukuljević sent it to Prague to Šafarik on 19 February 1857 as a loan. One photograph in Štefanić 1970. Black and white microfilm and photocopy made 1979 for Staroslavenski institut.	IzSt (2008)
legal		1470 (January 7)	Novljanski samostan collection, sv. 1. br. 7	HDA	Novi Vinodolski	1	32 x 15 cm	1 co	Knez Martin Frankapan daruje samostanu sv. Marije na Ospu kod Novoga njeka nova prava i imanja. Once housed in Budapest under sg. M.O.D.L. 37112.	
grant		1470 (December 13)	Novljanski samostan collection, sv. 1. br. 8	HDA	Novi Vinodolski	1	21 x 12 cm	1 co	Bratja Mikulotići daruju zemlju crkvi sv. Marije na Ospu pod Novim. Once housed in Budapest under sg. M.O.D.L. 37113.	
gospel commentary	GscMld	1471	ОЛДП F. 136	National Library of Russia	Moldova	299 + 8	29.5 x 20.5 cm	1 co	Commentary on the gospel by priest Dobromir. Cyrillic script with the use of glagolitic letters, example on the pages 72–73.	NLR
legal		1471 (April 2)		Dobrinj	Omišalj				Knez Ivan Frankapan daruje Ivanu Sršiću zemlje na Sužanu. Original located in Dobrinj, Italian translation in Sužan. Original lost. Survived in Latin translation of Žan Juraj Sabljić corrected by Žan Frančeska Bonmartini, translated back into Glagolitic by Petar Petriš in 1723–1724 (page 262-264 of his book in Dobrinj). Also survives in Italian translation in Sužan.	
legal		1471			Mošćenice	1	17 x 9 cm	1 co	Martin Malković, opat samostana Sv. Petra u Drazi kod Mošćenica u Istri, traži od mošćenićke uprave da mu se dopusti korištenje nekih zemljišnih posjeda i da se sa njih plaća samostanu desetina. Location unknown.	
legal		1472 (May 12)			Dalmatia				Oporuka popa Brajka. Acquired by Ivan Berčić.	
legal		1472 (May 18)	Novljanski samostan collection, sv. 1. br. 10	HDA	Novi Vinodolski		28.5 x 18.5 cm	1 co	Fratri sv. Marije na Ospu pod Novim kupuju kuću Fabijana Čehovića. Once housed at Budapest under sg. M.O.D.L. 37114. Bibliography:	
Ascetical Homilies of Isaac of Nineveh		1472	ф. 228 собр. рук. поступивших после Д. В. Пискарева No 59	RGB-Moskva	Russia	529			Постнически слова на Исак Сирин. Cyrillic with Glagolitic employed in Cyrillic paratext.	
legal		1472	Novljanski samostan collection, sv. 1 br. 10	HDA	Novi Vinodolski	1	26 x 14 cm	1 co	Juraj, plovan novogradski, izručuje fratrom sv. Marije na Ospu njeku kuću, koju im je prodao Fabijan Čehović. Once housed at Budapest under sg. M.O.D.L. 37115.	
legal		1473 (February 15)			Zadar				Oporuka popa Brajka Hranšića iz Bokanca. Acquired by Ivan Berčić.	
legal		1474 (December 8)		Arhiv HAZU	Griže	1	16.5 x 15.5 cm	1 co	Minak Malinarić with brother Ivan sell land to Toma Matašić. Acquired by Kukuljević.	
abecedary		1474	CLM 188891	Munich (BSB)		255			Tegernsee Abecedary (die Tegernsee Abecedarien).	
		1400s (third quarter)	Fragm. glag. 77	Arhiv HAZU		2	21.7 x 18 cm		Dvolist iz Tranzita sv. Jeronima. A different version text was also printed in a Glagolitic book in 1508.	
legal		1475 (March 15)	Samostan sv. Jelene collection br. 8	HDA	Švica	1	22 x 12.5 cm	1 co	Knez Martin Frankapan poklanja fratrom svete Jelene kod Senja njeko zemljište. Once housed at Budapest under sg. M.O.D.L. 35693.	
legal		1475 (April 1)							Vitko Krajač prodaje svoj vinograd Stanislavu vikaru samostana sv. Mikule na Gvozdu. Only Latinic transliteration survives, acquired by Kukuljević.	
letter		1475		Arhiv HAZU	Stubica?				Private letter connected to a will and an account of expenditures.	
legal		1476 (February 20)	Neoregestrata acta Fasc. 1650., br. 5	HDA	Novi Vinodolski	1	36.5 x 22.5 cm	1 co	Knez Martin Frankapan potvrdjuje bratji Lovrencu i Bartolu Čehovićem sela Pujevšane i Malu Prisiku, koja su bili dobili od njegovoga otca Mikule. Once housed at Budapest under sg. M.O.D.L. 34343. Bibliography: Parchment.	
grant		1476 (May 15)		Vrbnik?	Krk (island)				Ivan VII. Frankapan daje zidaru Stjepanu neke zemljoposjede u kontrati zvanoj vrh Kršplana na ime duga za plaću koju je knez Ivan trebao isplatiti spomenutom zidaru za njegov rad na gradnji frankapanskih kaštela na otoku Krku. Found by Ivan Črnčić in Vrbnik, not located by Ivšić.	
legal		1478 (May 4)			Novi Vinodolski				Knez Martin Frankapan daje fratrom samostana sv. Mikule na Gvozdu njekoja prava i posjedovanja. Survives only in Latinic transcription, acquired by Kukuljević.	
legal		1478 (June 11)		archive of Samuil Keglević in Lopor	Rmanj				Lapački stol rešava parnu Stjepana Mečara s Jurjem Našmanićem iz Glavatacah.	
legal		1479 (May 1)		Trg, Ozalj (općinska kuća)	Ozalj	1	22 x 21 cm	1 co	Knez Bartol Frankapan dopuštja svim purgarom ozaljskim, da mogu zidati kuće u drazi pod gradom Ozljem. A transcription by M. Sabljar was also made.	
grant		1470s (August 12)		Cres?	Krk				Knez Ivan VII. Frankapan daruje plemiću Jurmanu iz Vrbnika za njegovu dugogodišnju, vjernu službu i novac kojim mu je posudio zemljoposjed Drmun na području Vrbnika. Acquired by Mate Volarić parish priest of Cres, not located by Ivšić.	1911
missal		1400s (by middle)	Fragm. glag. 23	Arhiv HAZU		2	20 x 17.8 cm		Komad dvolista misala. Probably acquired by Kukuljević.	
missal		1400s (by middle)	Fragm. glag. 119	Arhiv HAZU		2	26 x 19 cm	2 co 32 ro	Dvolist misala. Includes Cyrillic note of Bosančica type. Discovered in remains of Euzebije Fermendžin. Parchment.	
breviary		1400s (by middle)	Fragm. glag. 56 (new)	Arhiv HAZU		1	32.4 x 26.7 cm	2 co 35 ro	List brevijara. Once the cover of a large book. Acquired by Kukuljević in Trsat.	
Gospel of Thomas		1400s (middle)	Fragm. glag. 99	Arhiv HAZU	Kajkavian territory?	1	18 x 12 cm		Fragment of Gospel of Thomas (Odlomak Tomina evanđelja (apokrif)). Paper. Possibly written in Kajkavian territory as evidenced by ekavisms and the word črka. It was attached to the 1508 Korizmenjak with signature I b 44 but separated 12 December 1932 by Stjepan Ivšić. Microfilms in Zagreb by 1978. Bibliography: One photograph in Štefanić 1970.	IzSt (2008)
missal		1400s (middle)	Fragm. glag. 133	Arhiv HAZU		2	22.5 x 15.5 cm		Dvolist misala. Acquired by Milčetić on Krk. It was in use as a cover of a school practice book for Italian and Latin from 1807 (Arhiv HAZU VII 119).	
missal		1400s (middle)	Fragm. glag. 21 d/I	Arhiv HAZU		1	6.5 x 12.5 cm		Ostrižak iz misala. Contains Proprium de sanctorum. Parchment.	
missal		1400s (middle)	Fragm. glag. 22	Arhiv HAZU	Dugi?	2	26.7 x 18.8 cm	2 co 34 ro	Krnji dvolist misala. There is a note from a likely 18th century hand referring to a certain Šime Šokota. The surname Šokota may point to Ždrelac, and at least to the Zadar archipelago.	
miscellany		1400s (middle)	Berčićevo sobranje fragmenata I, 27 (old 44)	Petersburg (гос. публ. библиотека)		1	23 x 13.5 cm	2 co	Acquired by Berčić in Tkon 1850.	IzSt (2008; on 508–509)
miscellany	CSen	1400s (middle)	X. VI. 13	Siena (Biblioteca Comunale)		59			Sijenski zbornik. A 1982 photocopy F 198 is kept at the Staroslavenski institut (and a 1978 microfilm FILM br. 17/2 at the Državni arhiv u Karlovcu and a copy of the same microfilm with sign. G-52 (ZM 57/13) at the HDA).	
grant		1482 (August 9)		Arhiv HAZU	Baška	1	18.5 x 28 cm	1 co	Krčki kancelar Ivan Žanjakov daruje pavlinskim samostanima Sv. Nikole na Gvozdu i Sv. Spasa kod Senja jedan vrt u Baškoj Drazi. Acquired by Kukuljević.	
legal		1482 (August 19)		Senj (arhiv senjskoga kaptola)	Senj	1, 1	21 x 12.5 cm	1 co	Senjski kapitan Maroj Žunević moli senjski kaptol, da vjerodostojno prepiše i pečatom potvrdi njeki list Dragiše Pednića iz Marinacah. Actually 2 documents because 2 copies were made and both survive in the same archive.	
judgement		1483 (May 28 or 19)		HDA	Senj				Senjski vicekapetan Laclav daje na uvid senjskom kaptolu odluku banskog i kraljevskog rotnog suda vezano uz spor buškog plemića Ivana Darojića iz sela Moholić s popom Nemanićem i drugim osobama.	
legal		1484 (March 1)		Arhiv HAZU	Tržić	1	35 x 16.5 cm	1 co	Petar, sin Franjin iz Mohlicah, prodaje svoju plemenštinu pred sudom u Tržiću Dujmu Vlajiću. Acquired by Kukuljević.	
legal confirmation		1484 (July 14)		Arhiv HAZU	Lapac				Original not located by Ivšić.	1898
legal		1484 (October 22–23)		Senj (arhiv senjskoga kaptola)	Bužani				Zastupnici biskupa senjskoga Pavla i senjskoga kaptola u parbi s dražkim opatom Ivanom, nenašavši na roku sudca, izabranoga modruškoga biskupa fra Antuna, pridržaju si pravo na opata Ivana zbog troškovah i škode.	
will		1474 (October), 1485 (January 7)		Mošćenice (župna kasa)	Mošćenice, Kožljak	1	39.5 x 12 cm	1 co	Wills of Martin Malković and Martin Mojsijević (Brevijar Martina Malkovića). Includes a 1485 confirmation by Martin Mojsijević of Kožljak with transcription of will of Martin Mojsijević by notary Grgur Gomilac.	
breviary	BrVin (BrKuk)	1485	I d 34 (Kuk 1)	Arhiv HAZU	Zadar?	165	39.5 x 28.7 cm	2 co 33 ro	Vinodol breviary (Vinodolski brevijar, Kukuljevićev brevijar). First hand wrote f. 1-79, f. 146–165. Second hand similar to first hand, responsible for middle of codex. Probably Franciscan in origin. Ikavisms point to the Krbava-Zadar area and the office of sv. Krsogon/Krševan points to Zadar. Obtained by Ivan Kukuljević Sakcinski in Vinodol, Croatia. Microfilm created 1980. Bibliography:	IzSt (2008)
breviary		1485? (or beginning of 1400s)	Fragm. glag. 53/a-d	Arhiv HAZU		3			Tri lista brevijara. Obtained by Kukuljević from cover of a book he acquired in Bribir. Scribe may have been same as BrVin (I d 34). May have belonged to same codex.	
breviary	BrVat_{10}	1485	Borgiano Illirico 10	Vatican Library	Bribir?	2+407	16-16.2 x 11.7 cm	2 co x 28-30 ro	Vatikanski brevijar Illirico 10 (Vatican breviary Illirico 10). Finished by don Mihovil in his house in Bribir for don Jurša Parabočić of Bužan. Microfilm in Zagreb by 1952. Bibliography:	IzSt (2008)
legal		1485 (February 10)	Crikvenički samostan collection br. 16	HDA	Vinodol	1	35 x 17 cm	1 co	Ivan Vlaj miri remete crikveničke s Jurkom Banićem. Once housed at Budapest with sg. M.O.D.L. 37117. Parchment.	
legal		1485 (April 11)	Glagolitica II-1b	HDA	Jablanac (Karlobag)				Priest Luka Mikulanić of Jablanac swears before witnesses to repay his debt of 150 libra Original lost. Survives only in transcription from second half of 17th century or beginning of 18th century.	IzSt (2008)
legal		1485 (June 5)		Senj (arhiv senjskoga kaptola)	Marinci u Bužanima	1		1 co	Zastupnik senjskoga biskupa Pavla i senjskoga kaptola izjavljuje, da će prizvati na rimski dvor proti obranomu sudcu fra Antunu biskupu modruškomu.	
legal		1485 (August 16)		Senj (arhiv senjskoga kaptola)	Senj	1		1 co	Dumankuš, predstojnik belgradski i guvernatur senjski, imenuje povjerenike, koji će predati njeku zemlju u Mohlićih onim, koje pristoji. Possibly from the same hand as the 1 June 1486 document; both poorly differentiate č from ć.	
legal		1485 (November 30)		Arhiv HAZU	Brinje	1 (2)	22 x 10 cm, 11 x 22 cm	1 co	Knez Anž VIII Frankapan odgovara na pismo kneza Benedikta Ratkaja te ga moli za odgodu nekog duga koji mu zbog trenutne nevolje ne može vratiti i nudi mu jednu utvrdu u zamjenu do povratka duga. In the hand of Ivan Frankapan himself. Fell apart into 2 fragments.	
breviary	BrDab	1486	III c 21	Arhiv HAZU	Croatia	306	33 x 23.5 cm	2 co 36-37 ro	Dabarski brevijar (Dabar breviary). Marginal corrections numerous throughout codex from hand similar to that of main text. Codex written by several alternating hands. Conservative hand more discrete for especially z, g, h, a ž. Ikavo-ekavian reflexes prevalent especially in second part. Text is oriented towards Franciscans and the Kingdom of Hungary as opposed to Pavlikani and Venetian territory. Later notes only on f. 159v, beginning 1515 in Dabar. Acquired by Kukuljević in Istria from Urban Golmajer of Grimalda. There is a Latin note Codex Nr. DCCCXXIV. Original name during preparation for Šurmin 1898 was Humski brevijar so it is possible Golmajer found it in Hum. Bibliography:	IzSt (2008)
miscellany	COxf_{1}	1486	Ms. Canon. Lit. 412	Bodleian Library	Croatia				Prvi oxfordski zbornik (First Oxford miscellany). Or the Confessional of St. Anthony. At least 3 scribes unless Michal changed his style often, so the date 1486 of the colophon on f. 158 should be taken as the starting point. Acquired by the Bodleian with the Canonici collection purchase in 1817. Canonici acquired them in Italy. Microfilm in Zagreb made 1985. Bibliography:	DB [part.], IzSt (2008)
miscellany	CKol	1486 (July 7)	III a 51 (Kuk. 352)	Arhiv HAZU		127	23 x 15.5 cm	2 co	Kolunićev zbornik (Kolunić miscellany). Scribe: deacon Broz Kolunić. Discovered by Kukuljević on Krk. In 1892 a Latinic transcription (GHR) was published. One photograph in Štefanić 1970. Bibliography:	IzSt (2008)
legal		1486 (April 12)							Popis zemaljah modruškoga vladanja. Survives only in Latinic transcription from 1697.	
legal		1486 (June 1)		Senj (arhiv senjskoga kaptola)	Senj				Laclav, vicekapitan senjski, očituje, da je kaptol senjski na njegovu prošnju odredio jednoga člana, da razvidi parnu Svilićah iz Bužanah s Nemanićem. Possibly same scribe as that of the 16 August 1485 document.	
legal		1486 (July 7)							Bilježka Broza Kolunića u rukopisu "Knjige sv. Bernarda" (Kukuljevićeva zbirka br. 352) str. 169.	
legal		1486 (October 26)		Senj (arhiv kaptola senjskoga)	Senj	1	21.5 x 14 cm	1 co	Tarnik Petar Makšak, kapitan senjski, moli senjski kaptol, da posvjedoči svojim listom, da Vusići nikada nisu plaćali hrepečke trgovine.	
missal		1486	Cod. slav. 8***	Austrian National Library			32 x 24.5 cm		Dio misala. Part of Novakov misal, but 1486 instead of 1482. Contains sekvencija za mrtve.	
judgement		1487 (February 24)		Arhiv HAZU	Bihać		36.5 x 18 cm	1 co	Kraljevski sud u Bihaću izdaje ispravu kojom rješava spor između Petrića i Ivanka Mankovića i njihovih sinova sa knezom Jurjem Kosinjskim. Acquired by Kukuljević.	
legal		1487 (April 19)		Arhiv HAZU	Bužani	1		1 co	Buški rotni stol saslušava svjedoke vezano uz spor oko nekih posjeda u kaseškom kotaru između plemića Prhoča i Črnote te, zbog različitih izjava svjedoka, upućuje stranke u sporu na kraljevski sud.	1898 [partial]
legal		1487 (April) or after		Arhiv HAZU	Vrbnik		27 x 21 cm	1 co	Will of priest Tomaš Sedmak (Oporuka popa Tomaša Sedmaka). Acquired by Kukuljević. Dated April 1487 Original lost, but this is a contemporary transcript, missing end. Includes end of a different will entered by Vrbnik notary Blaž Stupić (who also wrote a will 29 January 1515), in a younger hand than the 1487 will.	
legal		1487 (August 28)		Senj (arhiv senjskoga kaptola)	Glagolići (Bužani)			1-2 co	Balaš, prmancer senjske crkve, i kraljevski čovjek slušaju svjedoke u parni Ivanuša Obrakovića i Jurja Vidošića. Original lost, but this is a contemporary transcript, by same hand as 29 August 1487 document.	
legal		1487 (August 29)		Senj (arhiv senjskoga kaptola)	Bužani	1		3 co	Pop Balaš, prmancer crkve senjske, i kraljev čovjek Juraj Gubčić slušaju svjedoke u parni medju Zrčići i Petkom iz Bužanah. Original lost, but this is a contemporary transcript, by same hand as 29 August 1487 document.	
legal		1487 (September 2)			Vrbnik				Sborni zakon redovnikah i popovah vrbničkih na otoku Krku. Written at the end of a Glagolitic missal of the 1200s/1300s in Vrbnik.	
deed		1487 (September 27)		Arhiv HAZU	Dubašnica	1	15 x 17 cm	1 co	Ivan Vidović i Križman Oral daruju i prodaju neke svoje čestice zemlje i jednu lokvu Petru Hrvaćaninu.	
		1488–1696	br. 1	Vrbnik (župni ured)	Vrbnik	105	28 x 21 cm		Najstarija kapitulska knjiga.	
grant		1488 (April 8)		Arhiv HAZU	Dubašnica	1	24 x 17 cm	1 co	Petar Hrvaćanin daruje svojoj majci Dorotiji, ženi pokojnoga Jakomina, polovinu svojih novozasađenih vinograda, polovinu nekih zemljoposjeda, te polovinu godišnjih prinosa sa posjeda svoje žene. Same scribe as 27 September 1487.	
legal		1488 (May 8)		Senj (arhiv kaptola senjskoga)	Senj	1	22 x 17.5 cm	1 co	Kemendi Balašfi, porkulab senjski, moli senjski kaptol, da pošalje jednoga kanonika, koji će posvjedočiti, da se je Ivan Manković pritužio proti sudcem bužkim i da ih je za vremena pozvao pred kraljevski sud.	
letter		1488 (May 23)		Dubrovnik (Povijesni arhiv)		2			Glagoljsko pismo popa Jurja "po zapovidi Mihaila" izaslanika neretvanskog kapitana.	
grant		1488 (July 9)		Gorica (grof Attems library)	Novi grad u Lici				Vojvoda Žarko Dražojević poklanja pavlinskoj crkvi Blažene Djevice Marije u Zažićnu (Donje Pazarište) veliki zemljoposjed kod sela Donjeg Zažićna.	
legal		1488 (August 4–5)		Senj (arhiv kaptola senjskoga)	Senj	1		1 co	Kaptol senjski završuje račun o Jablancu s popom Šimunom Mečarićem i s popom Lukom.	
legal		1489 (February 3)			Brinje				Fratri samostana sv. Marije u Brinju daju u zakup jednu zemlju Martincu Fabinu sinu. Acquired by Kukuljević. Not located by Ivšić.	1911 (66a) [partial]
grant		1489 (March 28)	Fasc. 63 No 7	Zsély (arhiv grofova Zichy)	Korenica	1	27.5 x 14 cm	1 co	Krbavski knezovi Miklovuš, Petar, Juraj i Mikula daruju jedan mlin, četiri ždrijeba zemlje, sjenokoše i četiri vrta Frančisku Utišeniću, sinu kneza Bartola Utišenića iz Kamičica kao nagradu za njegovu vjernu službu.	
16 prophets		1480s	f. 76103 (Kirilo-Belozerski manastir) 9/134	RNB-Sankt-Peterburg	Russian	330			16 Prophets with commentary. Cyrillic with Glagolitic initials.	
legal		1490 (March 20)	Pavlinski samostan u Crikvenici, br. 18	HDA	Bribir	1	27.5 x 16 cm	1 co	Mikula iz Dubrovnika daje remetam crikveničkim trsje, koje im biše obećao njegov pokojni brat Maroje. Once housed at Budapest as sg. M.O.D.L. 37118. Parchment.	
legal		1490 (June 28 or 29)	Pavlinski samostan u Novome, sv. 1. br. 17	Croatian State Archives	Skurina	1	39 x 20.5 cm	1 co	Juraj Račić prodaje pred ličkim stolom svoju plemenštinu u Dolnjem Zažićnu Mateju Draškoviću. There is also an old Latinic transcription. Once housed at Budapest as sg. M.O.D.L. 37119. Arhiv HAZU has a 17th-century Latinic copy.	
legal		1490 (September 8)			Krk				Opis trsja fratarah sv. Mikule u Gvozdu, koje plaća biskupu krčkomu osmo. Acquired by Kukuljević. The scribe Juraj Pšeničić is the earliest known Glagolitic notary public.	
legal		1490 (November 1)	Pavlinski samostan u Novome, sv. 1. br. 18	Croatian State Archives	Gradčina		48 x 26 cm	1 co	Draškovići utemeljuju samostan remetah sv. Pavla na Gradčini. Once housed at Budapest as sg. M.O.D.L. 37120. Bibliography:	
legal		1490	Samostan sv. Spas collection br. 19	HDA	Tržić				Ivan Kosinski zalaže dio svoje plemenštine prioru samostana sv. Spasa pred bužkim stolom.	1983 (2006)
legal		1491	Neoregestrata acta sv. 1650, br. 6	HDA	near Samostan Sv. Petra na Petrovoj gori	1	29 x 20.5 cm	1 co	Fratar Mihalj, vikar samostana sv. Marije pri Zagrebu, prima u svoje bratstvo sv. Pavla Tomaša Vojnovića sa obitelju. Once housed at Budapest as sg. M.O.D.L. 34344. Paper.	
16 prophets		1492	f. 717 (Solovecki manastir) 694/802	RNB-Sankt-Peterburg	Russia	595			16 Prophets with commentary. Cyrillic with Glagolitic in titles and initials.	
legal		1492 (January 22 or 5)	Samostan zažićanski collection br. 9	HDA	Slunj				Knez Mihovil Frankapan daruje samostanu b. d. M. u Žažićnu dva ždrieba zemlje. Parchment.	
legal		1492 (September 24)	Pavlinski samostan u Novome sv. 1. br. 19	HDA	Tržić		34.5 x 20.5 cm	1 co	Bužki stol uvadja fratre samostana sv. Marije u Zažićnu u posjedovanje plemenštine u Mohlićih, koju im je u svojoj oporuci ostavio Dujam Vlaić. Once housed at Budapest as sg. M.O.D.L. 37121.	
legal		1487–1493	N. R. A. Fasc. 1650. N. 25	HDA	Brumno	1	21.5 x 15 cm	1 co	Štefan knez Blagajski moli kneza Petra Zrinjskoga, da pusti Šimuna Mehanovića i da učini, da se tomu Šimunu svi dugovi izplate. The letter is addressed to Petar II Zrinski who died 9 September 1493 at the Battle of Krbava, so it must date to before then. Once housed at Budapest with sg. M.O.D.L. 34342.	
quadresimal	ComGre, QdGre, QrGre	1493, 1493, 1498	R 4002 (old Cod. Slav. 55)	NSK	Croatia	158	20.2 x 14.5 cm		Greblov kvaresimal i tumačenje muke (Greblićeva Kvadriga). The Tlmačenie od muki was finished in 1493, the Kvadriga duhovnim zakonom was finished in 1493, the Kvaresimal was finished in 1498. Once part of Petris collection. Bought by NSK between 1960 and 1970 from the Petris Monastery of Krk according to one source. But it was once housed in the Austrian National Library as Cod. slav. 55. Microfilm at NSK by 1952. Bibliography:	NSK, GHR
legal		1493 (June 4)	Pavlinski samostan Sv. Jelene kod Senja br. 10	Croatian State Archives	Brinje		45 x 25.5 cm	1 co	Knez Anž Frankapan daruje fratrom samostana sv. Jelene kod Senja selo Košćice u vladanju buškom, koje bijaše dano Jeleni ženi kneza Žigmonta. Scribe same as for other 4 June 1493 document. Once housed at Budapest as sg. M.O.D.L. 38820. There is also an old Latinic transliteration and there was a Glagolitic transcription but only the original and the Latinic were found by Ivšić. Bibliography:	
legal		1493 (June 4)	Pavlinski samostan Sv. Jelene kod Senja br. 9	HDA	Brinje		43 x 29 cm	1 co	Knez Anž Frankapan daje samostanu sv. Jelene kod Senja selo Košćice, koje on dobi od svoje sestre Barbare Frankapanske. Scribe same as for other 4 June 1493 document. Once housed at Budapest as sg. M.O.D.L. 35733.	
missal	MGor (MisGoriz)	1493	Ms 2054	National and University Library of Slovenia	Slovenia, Gorizia	1		2co	Missal fragment. From the estate of Štefan Kocjančič in Gorizia.	NUK
grant		1493 (June 14)		HDA	Hreljin				Knez Brnardin III Frankapan daruje svom podaniku Ivanu Ramancu neki vinograd i zemljoposjed Jargovo kod Bribira za njegovu vjernu službu. Parchment.	
		1493 (July 23) or after			Krišćići (Podzvizd)	1		1 co	Elizabeth, daughter of the deceased Stjepan Farkašić, by the will of her father, gives lord Ivan Ilijić lands and the village Dolac (Jalžabet, kći pokojnoga Stjepana Farkašića, prema oporučnoj želji svoga oca, predaje plemiću Ivanu Ilijiću u vlasništvo posjede i selo Dolac). Ivšić dates it to the date of the original if original, or to the 15th or 16th century if a transcript.	1898 (p67); Image on Wikimedia Commons
legal		1493	Sign. Gl. II. 50	Arhiv HAZU	Ripač	1	27.5 x 18 cm	1 co	Stol humski oslobadja Jakova Vitulovića od službe, bira i svake daće za 20 godinah. Once part of Ferić family archive in Zagreb.	
breviary	BrN_{2}	1495	n/a	Novi Vinodolski parish library	Grobnik	500	36 x 26 cm		Drugi novljanski brevijar (Second Novi breviary). Written by a priest named Martinac in Grobnik, with the help of a few other scribes. It is a plenary breviary. Facsimile published 1977. Microfilm made by 1952 for JAZU, photocopy by 1977 for Star. inst. Bibliography:	
breviary		1495? (1400s)	Fragm. glag. 87	Arhiv HAZU		1	28.3 x 19 cm		List brevijara. Acquired by Kukuljević in Novi Vinodolski. Likely belonged to BrN_{2}. Photograph of one page published in Štefanić 1970.	
legal		1495 (January 25)			Brinje				Knez Anž Frankapan daruje samostanu sv. Mikule na Gvozdu tri sela.	
deed		1495 (March 5)	Sign. Gl. II. 52	Arhiv HAZU	Bag (Karlobag)	1	26 x 14 cm	1 co	Katarina, žena Tomaša Kovača, prodaje Marku Sultiću trsje i zemlju. Acquired by Kukuljević.	
legal		1495 (April 6)	Sign. Gl. II. 53	Arhiv HAZU	Dubašnica	1			Mojša Klaričić i njegova žena Dorka mole priora samostana Sv. Augustina u Rijeci da im po Ivanu Lukačiću pošalje deset dukata za neku prodanu zemlju. Lost as of Štefanić 1953 and 1969–1970.	
legal		1495 (April 24)	Sign. Gl. II. 55	Arhiv HAZU	Skurina (Lika)	1	33.5 x 15.5 cm	1 co	Petar Petrićević prodaje dio svojih zemaljah Jurju Milečiću pred kraljevskim stolom u Lici. Acquired by Kukuljević.	
grant		1495 (June 5)	Samostan sv. Spasa collection br. 20	HDA	Brinje	1	38 x 20 cm	1 co	Knez Anž Frankapan daruje samostanu sv. Spasa kod Senja selo Mali Prokičci.	
demarcation		1495 (July 10)	Sign. Gl. II. 54	Arhiv HAZU	Dubašnica	1		1 co	Doroteja, udovica Mojše Klaričića, pred svjedocima utvrđuje međe zemljoposjeda koji je njezin pokojni suprug prodao fra Ivanu, prioru crkve Sv. Augustina u Rijeci. Lost as of Štefanić 1953 and 1969–1970.	
deed with grant		1495	Pavlinski samostan u Novome Fasc. 1, br. 20	HDA	Slat (Topusko)		33 x 14 cm	1 co	Grgur Štampak daruje samostanu Sv. Petra na Petrovoj gori polovinu nekoga sela koji je naslijedio od strica Blaža, a drugu polovinu istog sela prodaje istom samostanu za tri zlatna dukata. Acquired by Budapest MKOL as M.O.D.L. 37.122 from the novljanska kloštra: Actorum conventus Noviensis Fasc. 1. No 20.	
miscellany	CAc	1400s (end, by 1496)	IV a 48	Arhiv HAZU	Croatia	94	20.2 x 14 cm		Zbornik duhovnoga štiva. On f. 94v there is a note saying Jurko wrote "it", dated it 1496, and a similar note for priest Mihovil. The hand that wrote that about Jurko was not the scribe of the main text. It was written in an area where ekavian reflex of the jat was more frequent than ikavian. At least by the beginning of the 18th century it was in Omišalj. Acquired by Kukuljević somewhere. Acquired by JAZU 1890–1891 from his remains. Scribes: hand A f. 1-90, hand B f. 90v-94v.	IzSt (2008)
legal		1496 (April 1)			Brinje				Knez Anž Frankapan daruje samostanu sv. Mikule na Gvozdu selo Mokro. Survives only in Latinic transcription, acquired by Kukuljević.	
legal		1496 (August 16)		Senj (arhiv kaptola senjskoga)	Senj	1		1 co	Senjski biskup Andrija šalje žakna Andriju, da kupi prineske, kojimi bi se imale kupiti orgulje za stolnu crkvu u Senju. There is also an old Latinic transliteration.	
legal		1496	Sign. Gl. II. 56	Arhiv HAZU	Senj	1	23 x 21.5 cm	1 co	Mikula Mukulanić moli zagrebačkog opata da pričeka dok prikupi ljetinu s posjeda arhiđakona Petra kako bi zagrebačkim crkvama mogao isplatiti deset zlatnika, kako je tražio arhiđakon Peter.	
deed		1496	DMV 595	HDA	Orlica/Orlovac kod Karlovca				Property sale of Lord Martin Dragačić to Brcko Mikanić (Plemić Martin Dragačić prodje jedan svoj plemićki posjed Brcku Mikaniću za 28 zlatnika). Parchment.	
legal		1497 (January 5)			Modruš				Only Latinic transcription from 28 December 1544 survives.	
legal		1497 (February 13)	Slatski samostan collection br. 15	HDA	Bakar	1		1 co	Martin Benković Pernanin daje vinograd samostanu na Slatskoj gori. Once housed at Budapest as sg. M.O.D.L. 34553.	
legal		1497 (October 30)	Gl. II. 57	Arhiv HAZU	Crna Vas (Lika)		33.5 x 23.5 cm	1 co	Stol lički riešava parnu Mihalja Škoblića s Lagodušići.	
legal		1498 (April 20)			Modruš				Knez Bernardin Frankopan potvrdjuje darovanje učinjeno Valentinu Hotkoviću, te točnije opisuje medje toga darovanja. Only Latinic transcription survives, acquired by Kukuljević.	
legal		1498 (November 15)								
legal		1498 (December 1)			Brinje				Knez Anž Frankopan potvrdjuje darovanje, kojim su Juraj i Paval Tomkovići darovali jedno selo samostanu sv. Mikule na Gvozdu. Survives only in Latinic transcription, acquired by Kukuljević.	
legal		1499 (April 26)	Samostan b.d. M. u Zažićnu collection br. 10	HDA	Skurina				Paval Slavković prodaje jedan ždrieb a pol ždrieba poklanja fratrom b. d. M. u Zažićnu, pred stolom ličkim.	1983 (2006)
legal		1499 (May 8)	Samostan b. d. Marije u Zažićnu collection br. 11	Croatian State Archives	Skurina				Paval Slavković daruje fratrom b. d. Marije u Zažićnu pol svoga ždrieva, pred stolom ličkim. Parchment.	
legal		1499 (June 10)	Samostan zažićanski collection br. 12	HDA	Skurina/Skurinja (Lika)				Juraj Malić daje fratrom sv. Marije u Zažićnu njeke zemlje, koje im je ostavio u oporuci njegov sin Petar. Parchment.	
		1490s, 1515–1517, 1531–1557, 1566–1569	VIII 273	Arhiv HAZU		146	32.5 x 21.2 cm		Notarski protokol Franca Sparožića 1515–1517 i 1531–1557 te Matija Sparožića 1566–1569. There are also prilozi A, B, C, which may or may not have originally been part of the protocol. A dates to the 1490s, B to the middle of 1513 to 1517, C to 1553. It entered the archive of the krčki sud. Given to Štefanić in 1931 by Mate Oršić parish priest of Vrh near Krk who had owned it for a long time. Given by Štefanić to Arhiv JAZU in 1958. One photograph in Štefanić 1970.	
abecedary		1400s (second half)	Ms. quart 1810	Munich (LMU Munich's University Library)					Die Gotzkircher Abecedarien. In a Latin manuscript with other alphabets including Glagolitic and Cyrillic on ff. 41-56v.	
missal	MOxf_{1}	1400s (second half)	Ms. Canon. Lit. 373	Bodleian Library		176+4	32.5 x 22.5 cm	2 co x 31 ro	Prvi oksfordski misal (First Oxford missal). Folio 84r has a possibly Cyrillic initial, similar to BrOxf. Acquired with Canonici collection in 1817. Canonici acquired them in Italy. Bibliography:	DB, IzSt (2008)
missal	MOxf_{2}	1400s (second half)	Ms. Canon. Lit. 349	Bodleian Library		239	25 x 18 cm	2 co	Drugi oksfordski misal (Second Oxford missal). The first folio recto has the proper for St. Florian added in a different hand, probably later. Acquired with Canonici collection in 1817. Canonici acquired them in Italy. Microfilm in Zagreb by 1952. Bibliography:	DB, IzSt (2008)
breviary		1400s (second half), 1600s/1700s		Arhiv Zadarske nadbiskupije		2 + 26	27 x 20 cm	2 co 38 ro	Pašmanski dvolist brevijara. A bifolium, plus 16 strips (14 Glagolitic, 9 Latinic, 3 empty) from the same codex once used as bookmarks. Removed from the cover of a copy of the Karamanov misal (printed 1741) in the župni ured of Pašman. Includes a bifolium and 14 very small fragments. Written in two scripts from very different time periods. Microfilm in Zagreb made 1990.	1996 (2006)
breviary		1400s (second half)	Hs. 566	Vienna (Deutschordenszentralarchiv)		2	35 x 24.5 cm		DOZA 566.	
missal	Fg(M)Var_{2}	1400s (second half)		Varaždin (Capuchin Monastery)		1	35 x 25 cm	2 co 28 ro	Second Varaždin Fragment (Drugi varaždinski fragment). Separated in 1986 by Anica Nazor from cover of IX c. 6 (a book printed 1705), which had been known to brother Bono Zvonimir Šagi who had shown it to Anica Vlašić-Anić in 1984.	
missal		1400s (second half)	Fragm. glag. 113	Arhiv HAZU		1	26 x 19.3 cm	2 co 32 ro	List misala. Once owned by pop Paval Sindičić who left a note 1684. He was prokurator of the clergy in Baška 1664. Brought from Dubašnica to JAZU by Milčetić as a gift near the end of his life. Parchment.	
missal		1400s (second half)	Fragm. glag. 24/c-d	Arhiv HAZU		1			Dva komada jednog lista misalića. Once part of a small mass book in the Capuchin Monastery library in Rijeka. Includes a marginal note. Bibliography:	
missal		1400s (second half)	Fragm. glag. 25/a	Arhiv HAZU		1 p	19.7 x 13.5 cm		Negativan otisak jedne strane misala.	
breviary		1400s (second half)	Fragm. glag. 122	Arhiv HAZU		2	14.5 x 10.5 cm	2 co	Krnj dvolist brevijara. Includes a 1660s note from žakan Ivan Šparožić. Once cover of Plač Marijin (sign. VII 160) acquired by JAZU in 1959 from the remains of Jerko Gršković of Vrbnik. Parchment.	
breviary		1400s (second half)	Fragm. glag. 81	Arhiv HAZU		2	14.3 x 13.5 cm		Dvolist brevijara. Significant for text of Protevangelium of James. Acquired by Kukuljević in Novi Vinodolski. Parchment.	
confessional		1400s (last quarter)	VII 23	Arhiv HAZU		67	16 x 11 cm	2 co 29-40 ro	Antoninov konfesional. Likely written by a single scribe with varied handwriting. Language ikavo-ekavian and with /a/ as reflex of *ę behind palatal, so possibly from West Chakavian territory. But it ended up in Istria by 1719. Acquired by Milčetić in Dobrinj from priest Variola who found it on the napa of his kitchen, explaining the smoke and condensation damage. Acquired by JAZU upon the death of Milčetić. Parchment. Microfilm made by 1952 kept at HAZU. One photograph in Štefanić 1970. Bibliography:	
breviary	BrBrt (BrBrit)	1400s (late)	Ms. Add. 31.951 (sometimes 31951)	British Library	Croatia	71	30.5 x 22 cm		Britanski brevijar (British breviary). Written by a certain Ivan Križanić. It was kept in the British Museum until 1882, when it was moved to the British Library. It was described by Vajs in Charvatsko-hlaholský kodex a hlaholský zlomek v Britském museu v Londýně (Sborník filologický 5: 191–197). Microfilm by 1978 (Star. inst. FILM br. 4, HDA G-41 (ZM 57/2)). Bibliography:	IzSt (2008), IzSt (2008)
missal		1400s (late)		Košljun	Košljun	1	12.2 x 4 cm		Košljunski ostrižak misala.	
miscellany	CLab	1400s (late)	Slav. Sammlung, futural 3, br. 368 (Ms 368–3, Zoisova zbirka)	National and University Library of Slovenia	Croatia				Ljubljanski zbornik (Ljubljana miscellany). Bibliography:	IzSt (2017 from NUK), IzSt (2008)
miscellany		1400s (end)	IV a 92	Arhiv HAZU	Vrbnik?	155	14.5 x 10.5 cm		Zbornik duhovnog štiva: Antoninov konfesional, Plač Gospin i drugo. Scribes: hand A f. 1-40, hand B f. 41–42, hand C f. 42v-44v, hand D f. 44v-48v, alternating hands f.49-56v (but mostly E), hand E f. 57–76, hand F f. 77-130v and 134-155v, hand H f. 132-132v, hand G f. 131-11v and 133-133v. All hands are similar so likely from the same school. Hand F is similar to A but with notable differences. Hand H also wrote the parchment dvolist at the end of the codex. Likely written on Krk, especially Vrbnik or Omišalj. Later owned by Franciscans on Krk, including fra Ivan Caković and fra Jure Buić. Acquired by Kukuljević on 14 November 1848 from a certain Lovričić, student of the III order of Saint Francis. One photograph in Štefanić 1970. Photocopies exist in DVD format at the HDA (DVD 14) and the Staroslavenski institut (DVD 12(HDA)). Bibliography:	
		1400s (end)	?	Bogovići (župni ured)	Dubašnica	2	20.5 x 16.3 cm		Dubašljanski dvolist brevijara.	
homiliary		1400s (end)		Krk (arhiv bivšeg Staroslavenskog instituta)		175	27 x 20 cm		Krk Homiliary (Krčki homilijar, Homilijar na Matejevo evanđelje). Čakavian with some kajkavisms. Text translated from Czech. In 1779 it belonged to doge Peter Paul Renier. Acquired by Fran Volarić (1851–1908). Microfilm in Zagreb by 1978.	IzSt (2008)
homiliary		1400s (end)		?		12			Odlomak homilijara. Donated to Staroslavenska akademija by Fran Volarić (died 1908) but it was not found there in preparation for Milčetić 1955 or Štefanić 1960.	
		1400s (by or in)	Berčićevo sobranje fragmenata I, 34 (old 34, 58)	Petersburg (гос. публ. библиотека)		1	16.7 x 15 cm		Ostrižak lista. A negative from a different manuscript.	IzSt (2008; on 494)
missal		1400s	Ms 2042	Ljubljana (Narodna in univerzitetna knjižnica)		2			Glagolski misal. Parchment. Discovered at Strahov in the Canon library, being used as a cover of Keppler's Astronomy. First reported by Vajs in 1910. Studied by multiple authors. Transferred to Ljubljana.	DSK
missal		1400s	Fg(M)Mon	private library in London, private library in Devon		2	26.2 x 17.1 cm		Second Munich missal fragment (Drugi Münchenski fragment misala). Split into a private library in London and a private library in Devon.	
missal		1400s	Berčićevo sobranje fragmenata I, 28 (old 46), 29 (old 47)	Petersburg (гос. публ. библиотека)		2	28.4 x 29.5 cm		Odlomak misala.	IzSt (2008; on 504–507)
missal		1400s	Berčićevo sobranje fragmenata II, 61–66	Petersburg (гос. публ. библиотека)		6	29.2 x 21 cm	2 co 32 ro	Odlomak misala. Acquired by Berčić from the monastery of Saint Michael in Zadar 1848.	IzSt (2008; on 206–217)
missal		1400s	Berčićevo sobranje fragmenata II, 113	Petersburg (гос. публ. библиотека)		1	21.2 x 16.9 cm		Malen odlomak blagoslova valjda iz misala. Acquired by Berčić in Premuda.	IzSt (2008; on 111–112)
missal		1400s	Berčićevo sobranje fragmenata II, 116	Petersburg (гос. публ. библиотека)		1	15.8 x 21.5 cm		Odlomak misala. Includes note by don Šime Končinić of Luka who acquired the missal when it was whole. Discovered by Berčić 24 September 1856 in Ugljan.	IzSt (2008; on 105–106)
missal		1400s	Berčićevo sobranje fragmenata II, 108, 108A	Petersburg (гос. публ. библиотека)		2	15.5 x 10 cm	2 co 42 ro	Dvolist lekcije iz evanđelja i epistole (Muka). Discovered by Berčić on Krk.	IzSt (2008; on 121–122)
missal		1400s	Berčićevo sobranje fragmenata II, 109	Petersburg (гос. публ. библиотека)		1		2 co 31 ro	Odlomak većeg lista. Acquired by Berčić on Rab 1856.	IzSt (2008; on 119–120)
missal		1400s	Berčićevo sobranje fragmenata II, 110	Petersburg (гос. публ. библиотека)		1	15.7 x 14.5 cm		Mali fragmenat većega lista. Acquired by Berčić from a certain Bacinić in Pašman 1856 (not 1859).	IzSt (2008; on 117–118)
missal		1400s	Berčićevo sobranje fragmenata II, 111, 112	Petersburg (гос. публ. библиотека)		2		2 co 32 ro	Dvolist. Once served as cover of a book. Smoke damage. Acquired by Berčić in Kožino 17 July 1856.	IzSt (2008; on 113–116)
missal		1400s	Berčićevo sobranje fragmenata II, 114–115	Petersburg (гос. публ. библиотека)		2			Dva poveća odlomka. Acquired by Berčić in Ugljan 24 September 1856.	IzSt (2008; on 107–110)
missal		1400s	Berčićevo sobranje fragmenata II, 117–118	Petersburg (гос. публ. библиотека)		2	28.5 x 19.5 cm		Dvolist lekcija u foliju. Acquired by Berčić 18 October 1856.	IzSt (2008; on 100–104)
missal		1400s	Berčićevo sobranje fragmenata II, 119	Petersburg (гос. публ. библиотека)		1			Dvolist. Acquired by Berčić.	IzSt (2008; on 98–99)
missal		1400s	Berčićevo sobranje fragmenata II, 120	Petersburg (гос. публ. библиотека)		1	28.5 x 20 cm	2 co 2 ro	Acquired by Berčić.	IzSt (2008; on 95–97)
missal		1400s	Berčićevo sobranje fragmenata II, 121–122	Petersburg (гос. публ. библиотека)		2	29 x 20 cm	2 co 31 ro	Acquired by Berčić.	IzSt (2008; on 91–94)
missal		1400s	Berčićevo sobranje fragmenata II, 123–124	Petersburg (гос. публ. библиотека)		2		2 co 32 ro	Dvolist muke. Includes the Gospel of Luke. Once served as cover to a book.	IzSt (2008; on 87–90)
missal		1400s	Berčićevo sobranje fragmenata II, 125	Petersburg (гос. публ. библиотека)		1		2 co 32 ro	Acquired by Berčić 12 May 1857 in Seline.	IzSt (2008; on 86-86)
missal		1400s	Berčićevo sobranje fragmenata II, 126	Petersburg (гос. публ. библиотека)		1		2 co 34 ro	Acquired by Berčić in Savar 26 May 1857.	IzSt (2008; on 83–84)
missal		1400s	Berčićevo sobranje fragmenata II, 127, 128, 129	Petersburg (гос. публ. библиотека)		3			Tri ostriška istoga rukopisa.	IzSt (2008; on 81–82)
missal		1400s	Berčićevo sobranje fragmenata II, 130	Petersburg (гос. публ. библиотека)		1			Prošupljen fragmenat.	IzSt (2008; on 79–80)
missal		1400s	Berčićevo sobranje fragmenata II, 131	Petersburg (гос. публ. библиотека)		1			Poveći odlomak. Acquired in "Cali" (Sali or Kali). Includes finding-note "Sab. ante D. II. quadrag."	IzSt (2008; on 77–78)
missal		1400s	Berčićevo sobranje fragmenata II, 132	Petersburg (гос. публ. библиотека)		1		2 co 36 ro	Sent by Cassioni 6 July 1861. Berčić received it 13 August 1861.	IzSt (2008; on 74–76)
missal		1400s	Berčićevo sobranje fragmenata II, 133	Petersburg (гос. публ. библиотека)		1			Discovered on Košljun by Cassioni, sent 6 July and arrived 13 August 1861 to Berčić.	IzSt (2008; on 72–73)
missal		1400s	Berčićevo sobranje fragmenata II, 134	Petersburg (гос. публ. библиотека)		1		2 co 32 ro	Nepotpun list. Acquired by Berčić in Kukljica on 12 June 1863.	IzSt (2008; on 70–71)
missal		1400s	Berčićevo sobranje fragmenata II, 135, 136	Petersburg (гос. публ. библиотека)		2	27.5 x 18.6 cm	2 co 33 ro	Dvolist. Includes Gospels of Matthew and Luke.	IzSt (2008; on 66–69)
missal		1400s	Berčićevo sobranje fragmenata II, 137	Petersburg (гос. публ. библиотека)		1		2 co 34 ro	Acquired by Berčić.	IzSt (2008; on 64–65)
missal		1400s	Berčićevo sobranje fragmenata II, 138, 139	Petersburg (гос. публ. библиотека)		2		2 co 37 ro	Dvolist lekcija iz posta. Possibly from the same manuscript as 140–143. Discovered by Berčić 1863 in Pakoštane.	IzSt (2008; on 60–63)
missal		1400s	Berčićevo sobranje fragmenata II, 140–143	Petersburg (гос. публ. библиотека)		4		2 co 37 ro	Četiri lista iz istog rukopisa. Includes lessons from the Gospels and Epistles, Leviticus, Malachi the prophet, Zechariah. Discovered by Berčić 1863 in Pakoštane.	IzSt (2008; on 51–60)
missal		1400s	Berčićevo sobranje fragmenata II, 145–150	Petersburg (гос. публ. библиотека)		4		2 co 36 ro	Acquired by Berčić from Pašman (from Meneghello in 1864).	IzSt (2008; on 37–48)
missal		1400s	Berčićevo sobranje fragmenata II, 151–152	Petersburg (гос. публ. библиотека)		2		2 co 30 ro	Discovered by Berčić on Žman.	IzSt (2008; on 33–36)
missal		1400s	Berčićevo sobranje fragmenata II, 153–154	Petersburg (гос. публ. библиотека)		2			Discovered by Berčić on Žman.	IzSt (2008; on 30–32)
missal		1400s	Berčićevo sobranje fragmenata II, 155	Petersburg (гос. публ. библиотека)		1		2 co 29 ro	Acquired by Berčić in Žman 1866.	IzSt (2008; on 28–29)
missal		1400s	Berčićevo sobranje fragmenata II, 156	Petersburg (гос. публ. библиотека)		1		2 co 35 ro	Acquired by Berčić in Žman 1866.	IzSt (2008; on 26–27)
missal		1400s	Berčićevo sobranje fragmenata II, 157–158	Petersburg (гос. публ. библиотека)		1			Acquired by Berčić in Žman 28 August 1866.	IzSt (2008; on 22–25)
missal		1400s	Berčićevo sobranje fragmenata II, 159–160	Petersburg (гос. публ. библиотека)		2		2 co 30 ro	Acquired by Berčić in Žman 22 August 1866.	IzSt (2008; on 18–21)
missal		1400s	Berčićevo sobranje fragmenata I, 90 (149)	Petersburg (гос. публ. библиотека)		1			Ostrižak. Acquired by Berčić in Ugljan on 24 September 1856.	IzSt (2008; on 389–390)
missal		1400s	Berčićevo sobranje fragmenata II, 4, 5	Petersburg (гос. публ. библиотека)		2			Odlomčići. Acquired by Berčić in Sali 3 December 1866 from Petešić.	IzSt (2008; on 328–329)
missal		1400s	Berčićevo sobranje fragmenata II, 6, 7	Petersburg (гос. публ. библиотека)		2	19.5 x 14.5 cm	2 co	Dio dvolista. Acquired 3 December 1866 in Sali from Petešić.	IzSt (6: 2008), IzSt (7: 2008) IzSt (2008; on 324–327)
missal		1400s	Berčićevo sobranje fragmenata II, 70, 71	Petersburg (гос. публ. библиотека)		2	21.4 x 17 cm		Discovered in Ugljan 1848.	IzSt (2008; on 196–199)
missal		1400s	Berčićevo sobranje fragmenata II, 72, 73	Petersburg (гос. публ. библиотека)		2	24.1 x 15 cm		Discovered in Sestrunj 1848.	IzSt (2008; on 192–195)
missal		1400s	Berčićevo sobranje fragmenata II, 74, 75	Petersburg (гос. публ. библиотека)		2		2 co 31 ro		IzSt (2008; on 188–191)
missal		1400s	Berčićevo sobranje fragmenata II, 76, 77	Petersburg (гос. публ. библиотека)		2		2 co 38 ro	Acquired by Berčić from the sv. Jeronim monastery in Sveti Martin on Cres in 1848.	IzSt (2008; on 184–187)
missal		1400s	Berčićevo sobranje fragmenata II, 78, 78A	Petersburg (гос. публ. библиотека)		2				IzSt (2008; on 182–183)
missal		1400s	Berčićevo sobranje fragmenata II, 79	Petersburg (гос. публ. библиотека)		1			Acquired by Berčić in Tkon 16 December 1850.	IzSt (2008; on 180–181)
missal		1400s	Berčićevo sobranje fragmenata II, 80	Petersburg (гос. публ. библиотека)		1			Acquired by Berčić in Birbinj 1851.	IzSt (2008; on 177–178)
missal		1400s	Berčićevo sobranje fragmenata II, 81, 82	Petersburg (гос. публ. библиотека)		2			Acquired by Berčić in Birbinj 1851.	IzSt (2008; on 173–175)
missal		1400s	Berčićevo sobranje fragmenata II, 83, 84	Petersburg (гос. публ. библиотека)	Glavotok	2		2 co 33 ro	Acquired by Berčić in Glavotok 1851. Parchment.	IzSt (2008; on 169–172)
missal		1400s	Berčićevo sobranje fragmenata II, 85	Petersburg (гос. публ. библиотека)		1		2 co 31 ro	Acquired by Berčić in Rava 1851.	IzSt (2008; on 167–168)
missal		1400s	Berčićevo sobranje fragmenata II, 86–89	Petersburg (гос. публ. библиотека)		4		2 co 31 ro	Acquired by Berčić in Preko 1851.	IzSt (2008; on 159–166)
missal		1400s	Berčićevo sobranje fragmenata II, 55, 56	Petersburg (гос. публ. библиотека)		2		1 co 31 ro	Okrnjen dvolist. Acquired by Berčić in Brbinj 1851.	IzSt (2008; on 227–231)
missal		1400s	Berčićevo sobranje fragmenata II, 57	Petersburg (гос. публ. библиотека)		1		2 co 32 ro	Jedan stupac većega lista. Acquired by Berčić in Prvić 1848.	IzSt (2008; on 225–226)
missal		1400s	Berčićevo sobranje fragmenata II, 10–13	Petersburg (гос. публ. библиотека)		4			Odlomci dvolista. Acquired by Berčić on Rab 22 February 1867.	IzSt (2008; on 312–319)
missal	Fg(M)Vsp (FgCap VlaVsp)	1400s	FgCapVla collection	Karlobag (Capuchin Monastery)		1			Includes VlaVsp_{1} (recto) and VlaVsp_{2} (verso). Found inside of a 1686 Psalterium Romanum.	
missal		1400s	Cod. Slav. 137	Austrian National Library						
missal		1400s	Cod. Slav. 166	Austrian National Library		2	21.3 x 14.6 cm		Once owned by Mihael Žolgar and by Franz Miklosich. Parchment.	
breviary		1400s				1	36.5 x 25.5 cm		Includes part of the reading for the Feast of Apollonia. Incorporated into the binding of a copy of the 1562 book De Medendis Febribus ars medica. By the late 17th century it had been acquired by the Bibliotheca Windhagiana of count Joachim Enzmilner (most of the collection was 1656–1670) at the Schloss Windhaag. Upon his death the library was acquired by the Dominican convent in Vienna. In 1777, the collection was forcibly removed to the University Library of Vienna, but not all books were incorporated. This book ended up in the hands of Karl Johann Altmann in the 18th century and of Greg. Fritz in the 19th century. Acquired by Richard Doughty of Cinderella Books, who stored it in a disused greenhouse. It was purchased by an unnamed owner, who took it to Bloomsbury Auctions Ltd., who recognised the value of the manuscript on 8 July 2015. It was sold in Lot no. 91 for £14000 on 6 July 2017.	IzSt [part.]
breviary		1400s	Berčićevo sobranje fragmenata I, 2, 2A	Petersburg (гос. публ. библиотека)		2			Dvolist. Acquired by Berčić from B. Pletikosa in Tkon 31 August 1869.	IzSt (2008; on 548–549)
breviary		1400s	Berčićevo sobranje fragmenata I, 9 (old 17)	Petersburg (гос. публ. библиотека)		2	21.5 x 17.5 cm		Dvolist. Acquired by Berčić in Prvić 1848.	IzSt (2008; on 536–537)
breviary		1400s	Berčićevo sobranje fragmenata I, 10, 11 (old 19)	Petersburg (гос. публ. библиотека)		2	30 x 22	2 ro 36 co	Dvolist. Acquired by Berčić in the monastery sv. Mihovila in Zadar from the prior of sv. Ivan Krstitelj monastery in 1848.	IzSt (2008; on 532–535)
breviary		1400s	Berčićevo sobranje fragmenata I, 12, 13 (old 23), 14, 15, (old 24, 25), 16 (old 26)	Petersburg (гос. публ. библиотека)		3	14 x 9.5 cm	2 co 30 ro	Ugljanski fragmenti brevijara. Discovered by Berčić in the house of Mufa Belić on Ugljan 25 September 1848. Fragments 12 and 13 are a bifolium. Fragments 14, 15 and 16 are a strip of a single folio.	IzSt (2008; on 526–531)
breviary		1400s	Berčićevo sobranje fragmenata I, 1 (old 2)	Petersburg (гос. публ. библиотека)		1	32.8 x 22 cm		Acquired by Berčić from Petešić in Sali 3 December 1866. Contains part of the Book of Esther and the Book of Judith. Bibliography:	IzSt (2008; on 550–553)
breviary		1400s	Berčićevo sobranje fragmenata I, 26, (old 26, 42)	Petersburg (гос. публ. библиотека)		1	27.7 x 19.2 cm	2 co		IzSt (2008; on 510–511)
breviary		1400s	Berčićevo sobranje fragmenata I, 43 (old 70)	Petersburg (гос. публ. библиотека)		1	31.4 x 22 cm	2 co 36 ro	Text is sv. Lucija. Includes note by don Anton Belić curate of Tribunj from 5 November 1684. Belić also wrote a Cyrillic note and a prayer started in Glagolitic and ended in Cyrillic.	IzSt (2008; on 476–477)
breviary		1400s	Berčićevo sobranje fragmenata I, 48, (old 79)	Petersburg (гос. публ. библиотека)		1			Acquired by Berčić in Sutomišćica.	IzSt (2008; on 465–466, top)
breviary		1400s	Berčićevo sobranje fragmenata I, 45 (old 74), 46 (old 75)	Petersburg (гос. публ. библиотека)		2	29.5 x 21 cm		Acquired by Berčić on Krk.	IzSt (2008; on 469–473)
breviary		1400s	Berčićevo sobranje fragmenata I, 51 (old 84), 52 (old 85), 53 (old 86), 54 (old 87)	Petersburg (гос. публ. библиотека)		4		2 co	Mali ostrišcki brevijara. Script unusually small.	IzSt (2008; on 460–461)
breviary		1400s	Berčićevo sobranje fragmenata I, 55 (old 89), 56	Petersburg (гос. публ. библиотека)		2	25.5 x 14.9 cm	2 co 32 ro	Once served as a book cover.	IzSt (2008; on 457–459)
breviary		1400s	Berčićevo sobranje fragmenata I, 56, 60 (old 96), 61 (old 98)	Petersburg (гос. публ. библиотека)		3			Used as cover of a theological book belonging at one point to Frane Franić of Sutomišćica. Acquired by Berčić in Sutomišćica 29 July 1856.	IzSt (2008; on 448–453)
breviary		1400s	Berčićevo sobranje fragmenata I, 62	Petersburg (гос. публ. библиотека)		1	35.5 x 21 cm		List brevijara. Once the cover of a book. Acquired by Berčić in Sutomišćica (probably in 1856).	IzSt (2008; on 446–447)
breviary		1400s	Berčićevo sobranje fragmenata I, 70 (old 115), 71 (old 116)	Petersburg (гос. публ. библиотека)		2	21.3 x 15 cm	2 co 32 ro	Dvolist brevijara. Once used as a cover of a book belonging to priest Šimun Čarkvarić of Božava on 20 August 1802.	IzSt (2008; on 427–430)
breviary		1400s	Berčićevo sobranje fragmenata I, 72, 73, 74, 75 (old 118–121)	Petersburg (гос. публ. библиотека)		4	20 x 14.5 cm	2 co 30-31 ro	Dva dvolista brevijara. Acquired by Berčić in Pakoštane.	IzSt (2008; on 419–426)
breviary		1400s	Berčićevo sobranje fragmenata I, 76	Petersburg (гос. публ. библиотека)		1				IzSt (2008; on 417–418)
breviary		1400s	Berčićevo sobranje fragmenata I, 77 (125), 78 (126), 79 (127)	Petersburg (гос. публ. библиотека)		3	33.5 x 16 cn, 24.3 x 16.5 cm		Both the bifolium and the folio by the same hand and probably same original document, but Berčić acquired 77 in Soline and 78+79 in Premuda.	IzSt (2008; on 411–416)
breviary		1400s	Berčićevo sobranje fragmenata I, 81 (old 131)	Petersburg (гос. публ. библиотека)		1		2 co	Odlomak lista brevijara.	IzSt (2008; on 407–408)
breviary		1400s	Berčićevo sobranje fragmenata I, 109 (old 177)	Petersburg (гос. публ. библиотека)		1	27 x 19.2 cm	2 co 32 ro	A folio once used in the cover of a register of christenings. Acquired by Berčić in Kukljica 12 June 1863.	IzSt (2008; on 367–368)
breviary		1400s	Berčićevo sobranje fragmenata I, 87 (old 143)	Petersburg (гос. публ. библиотека)		1	29 x 21.5 cm	2 co 27 ro	Odlomci lista brevijara. Acquired by Berčić in Tkon 14 February 1862.	IzSt (2008; on 395–396)
breviary		1400s	Berčićevo sobranje fragmenata I, 47 (old 77)	Petersburg (гос. публ. библиотека)		1			Sitan ostrižak breviara.	IzSt (2008; on 467–468)
breviary		1400s	Berčićevo sobranje fragmenata I, 33 (old 55)	Petersburg (гос. публ. библиотека)		1	30 x 26.7 cm	2 co 31 ro	List brevijara.	IzSt (2008; on 495–497)
breviary		1400s	Berčićevo sobranje fragmenata I, 22, 23	Petersburg (гос. публ. библиотека)		2	19.5 x 16.5 cm	2 co	Krnj dvolist. Contains sv. Martin. Acquired by Berčić in Tkon 1850.	IzSt (2008; on 517–519)
breviary		1400s	Berčićevo sobranje fragmenata I, 24, 25	Petersburg (гос. публ. библиотека)		2	21.2 x 15.7 cm		Dvolist brevijara. Acquired by Berčić in Tkon on 16 December 1850.	IzSt (2008; on 512–516)
breviary		1400s	Berčićevo sobranje fragmenata I, 32	Saint Petersburg (гос. публ. библиотека)		1	28 x 19.7 cm	2 co 37 ro	Once at Glavotok. Acquired by Berčić in Glavotok on 12 October 1853.	IzSt (2008; on 498–499)
breviary		1400s	Berčićevo sobranje fragmenata I, 19	Saint Petersburg (гос. публ. библиотека)		1	30 x 21.7 cm		Once at Glavotok.	IzSt (2008; on 523–524)
breviary		1400s	Berčićevo sobranje fragmenata I, 110 (old 179)	Petersburg (гос. публ. библиотека)		1	29.6 x 20.2 cm	2 co 35 ro	List brevijara. Once used in a register of deaths (including an episcopal visit 1698). Acquired by Berčić 12 June 1863 in Kukljica.	IzSt (2008; on 365–366)
breviary		1400s	Berčićevo sobranje fragmenata I, 111 (old 181)	Petersburg (гос. публ. библиотека)		1	11.1 x 10.8 cm		Ostrižak brevijara. Acquired by Berčić from a certain Palud of Split 1863.	IzSt (2008; on 363–364)
breviary		1400s	Berčićevo sobranje fragmenata I, 112 (old 183)	Petersburg (гос. публ. библиотека)		1	28.0 x 20.4 cm	2 co 40 ro	List brevijara. Owned by or acquired by Berčić from Francesco Sellach of Zadar.	IzSt (2008; on 361–262)
breviary		1400s	Berčićevo sobranje fragmenata I, 114–117	Petersburg (гос. публ. библиотека)		4			Odlomci dvolista brevijara. Small script.	IzSt (2008; on 354–358)
breviary		1400s	Berčićevo sobranje fragmenata I, 118–119	Petersburg (гос. публ. библиотека)		3	15 x 10.5 cm			IzSt (2008; on 351–353)
breviary		1400s (end) / 1500s (beginning)	Berčićevo sobranje fragmenata I, 35, 36	Petersburg (гос. публ. библиотека)		2	14.4 x 10.1 cm	2 co 29 ro	Krnji dvolist brevijara.	IzSt (2008; on 491–493)
breviary		1400s	Berčićevo sobranje fragmenata I, 88 (old 145)	Petersburg (гос. публ. библиотека)		1			Sitan ostrižak. Acquired by Berčić in Tkon 14 February 1862.	IzSt (2008; on 393–394)
breviary		1400s	Berčićevo sobranje fragmenata I, 89 (old 147)	Petersburg (гос. публ. библиотека)		1		2 co 36 ro	Acquired by Berčić in Tkon.	IzSt (2008; on 391–392)
breviary		1400s	Berčićevo sobranje fragmenata I, 92–101	Petersburg (гос. публ. библиотека)		10			Četiri sitna fragmenta. Script "microscopic". Most of one side of 101 photographed in Milčetić 1955.	IzSt (2008; on 397–386)
breviary		1400s	Berčićevo sobranje fragmenata I, 63 (old 102), 64	Petersburg (гос. публ. библиотека)		1	32.5 x 15.8 cm	2 co 35 ro	Acquired by Berčić in Žman.	IzSt (2008; on 442–445)
breviary		1400s	Berčićevo sobranje fragmenata I, 57 (92), 58 (93)	Petersburg (гос. публ. библиотека)		2		2 co 32 ro	Dva neznatna ostriška. Acquired by Berčić in Kožino 17 July 1856.	IzSt (2008; on 455–456)
breviary		1400s	Berčićevo sobranje fragmenata I, 66 (old 108)	Petersburg (гос. публ. библиотека)		1	33 x 22.6 cm		Malen ostrižak iz Sutomišćice. Acquired by Berčić 2 August 1856 in Sutomišćica.	IzSt (2008; on 437–439)
breviary		1400s	Berčićevo sobranje fragmenata I, 80, 102	Petersburg (гос. публ. библиотека)		1	33.3 x 22.3 cm	2 co 31 ro	Acquired by Berčić in Olib. Includes note by Anton Boleta.	IzSt (2008; on 409–410), IzSt (2008; on 377–378)
breviary		1400s	Berčićevo sobranje fragmenata I, 67 (old 110)	Petersburg (гос. публ. библиотека)		1	29.2 x 20.3 cm	2 co 38 ro	Acquired by Berčić on 21 October 1856.	IzSt (2008; on 435–436)
breviary		1400s	Berčićevo sobranje fragmenata I, 68 (112), 69 (113)	Petersburg (гос. публ. библиотека)		2	33.7 x 22 cm	2 co 36 ro	Acquired by Berčić in Kali. Photograph of both sides of 68 in Milčetić 1955.	IzSt (2008; on 431–434)
breviary		1400s	Berčićevo sobranje fragmenata I, 50, 50A	Petersburg (гос. публ. библиотека)		2			Dvolist. Acquired by Berčić 1855 in Kukljica.	IzSt (2008; on 462–464)
breviary		1400s	Berčićevo sobranje fragmenata I, 120 (old 196)	Petersburg (гос. публ. библиотека)		1	15.6 x 11.5 cm		Found in Soline.	IzSt (2008; on 349–350)
breviary		1400s	Berčićevo sobranje fragmenata I, 123 (old 201)	Petersburg (гос. публ. библиотека)		1			Odlomak lista. Discovered in Žman.	IzSt (2008; on 344–345)
breviary		1400s	Berčićevo sobranje fragmenata I, 124 (old 205)	Petersburg (гос. публ. библиотека)		1	30 x 20.7 cm	2 co 41 ro	Acquired by Berić from dom Sekazi in Sali in 1863.	IzSt (2008; on 342–343)
breviary		1400s	Berčićevo sobranje fragmenata I, 125 (on 205)	Petersburg (гос. публ. библиотека)		1	22.6 x 14.1 cm		Odlomak lista. Acquired by Berčić from sv. Frane in Zadar 21 October 1865.	IzSt (2008; on 340–341)
breviary		1400s	Berčićevo sobranje fragmenata II, 58	Petersburg (гос. публ. библиотека)		1		2 co 29 ro	Odlomak lista u četvrtini. Acquired by Berčić in Prvić 1848.	IzSt (2008; on 223–224)
breviary		1400s (1460s?)	XXVII B 38 (inv. br. 8073)	Rijeka (Sveučilišna knjižnica)		2	37.2 x 27.5 cm		Dvolist glagoljičkoga časoslova (Riječki fragment Joba iz 1460). Used in cover of 1575 Tractatus cautelarum auctoribus atque collectoribus infra scriptis. Removed from book in 1950. Microfilm (M 239) and photocopies (F 367a-c at the Staroslavenski institut are of this fragment. Bibliography:	
breviary		1400s (end)	Glagolitica, br. 5	Split (Arheološki muzej)		1			Zadarski fragment brevijara. Originally in Zadar, where it had served as the cover of a register an 18th-century manuscript. Once belonged to don Roko Počina, professor of Old Church Slavonic in Zadar. Acquired by don Luka Jelić. Acquired by the Arheološki muzej of Split together with the remains of Luka Jelić in 1922. Considered lost by scholars working outside of Split in the 20th century but no longer. Bibliography:	IzSt (2015)
breviary		1400s	Glagolitica, br. 1	Split (Arheološki muzej)		2	21.5 x 15.5 cm		Banjski fragment brevijara. Once part of the archive of the Banj parish, where it had served as the cover of a register of confirmations from the 16th century. Acquired by don Luka Jelić. Acquired by the Arheološki muzej of Split together with the remains of Luka Jelić in 1922. Considered lost by scholars working outside of Split in the 20th century but no longer. Bibliography:	IzSt (2015), IzSt (2008)
breviary		1400s	Fragm. glag. 31/b	Arhiv HAZU		1	30.7 x 23 cm		List brevijara. Acquired by Kukuljević in Senj, where it was serving as the cover of a ledger of the church or brotherhood sv. Tijela. The ledger included names Juraj Strižić Vukov, Iuan Muxu Guratich, Juraj Sokolić and in 1733 castalad Iuan Supan.	
breviary		1400s	Fragm. glag. 35	Arhiv HAZU		1	22.9 x 21 cm		List brevijara. Acquired by Kukuljević from the cover of a 16th-century manuscript "Labašev rukopis".	
breviary		1400s	Fragm. glag. 37/c	Arhiv HAZU		1	21.2 x 17 cm		Pola lista brevijara (psaltira). Once part of the Capuchin Monastery library in Rijeka. Photograph in Štefanić 1953. Bibliography:	
breviary		1400s	Fragm. glag. 38/a	Arhiv HAZU		2	30 x 18.5 cm	2 co 36 ro	Dvolist brevijara. Once the cover of a book from Dalmatia where it was acquired by Kukuljević.	
breviary		1400s	Fragm. glag. 38/m (Kuk. 554)	Arhiv HAZU		2	11 x 7.5 cm		Dva sitna ostriška brevijara.	
breviary		1400s	Fragm. glag. 43	Arhiv HAZU		1	28 x 21.6 cm		List brevijara. Acquired by Kukuljević from S. Kocijančić on 6 January 1867. Kocijančić likely acquired it from Dobrinj from a Josip Gržetić (1837–1894). It had been used in Dobrinj as part of a document that included an Italian note written 1827 mentioning a Juraj Fugošić.	
breviary		1400s	Fragm. glag. 51	Arhiv HAZU		2		2 co 33 ro	Dva lista brevijara (apokalipse). Acquired by Kukuljević in Dolenjavasi in Istria.	
breviary		1400s	Fragm. glag. 63	Arhiv HAZU		2	19.8 x 14.3 cm		Dva lista brevijara. Includes 18th century note with Latinic o and êa pointing to North Dalmatia. Acquired by Kukuljević in Biograd na More. At the time used in cover of a printed Croatian ritual. Used by Kukuljević for an exhibition.	
breviary		1400s	Fragm. glag. 64	Arhiv HAZU		2	27.3 x 27 cm		Krnji dvolist brevijara. Acquired by Kukuljević from the cover of a more recent "unnotable" Latinic manuscript in Grižane.	
breviary		1400s	Fragm. glag. 72	Arhiv HAZU		2	20.6 x 14.5 cm	2 co 35 ro	Dvolist brevijara. Includes marginal notes by a student. Found along with 3 other fragments by Muškardin of Mali Lošinj, parish priest of Stivan on Cres.	
breviary		1400s	Fragm. glag. 84	Arhiv HAZU		2	29.3 x 20.2 cm		Dvolist brevijara. Acquired by Kukuljević from a certain Krišković of Bribir.	
breviary		1400s	Fragm. glag. 85, 86	Arhiv HAZU		2	30.6 x 21 cm	2 co 35 ro	Dva lista brevijara. 85 and 86 once belonged to the same codex. Includes 16th century Cyrillic note of Bosnian type. Acquired by Kukuljević probably in Istria or Croatian Primorje.	IzSt (2008)
breviary		1400s	Ms 2041	NUK		8			Brevir (Lekcije iz Tobijeve in Jobove knjige). Paper.	DSK
breviary		1400s	Ms 2043	NUK		4			Glagolski fragmenti iz Višnje gore. Once used as a book cover. Discovered by Konrad Črnologar. Parchment.	DSK
breviary		1400s	1 D c 1/26 (LA 14 H 36)	Prague (National Museum)	Croatia	2	21.5 x 17 cm	2 co 32/33 ro (originally)	Zlomky chorvatsko-hlaholského breviáře. Discovered by 1861 by Pavel Josef Šafařík in the cover of a copy of the 1483 Glagolitic missal. He may have discovered them while working in Novi Sad (through 1833) or they may have been sent to him from Croatia.	
breviary?		1400s	Berčićevo sobranje fragmenata II, 8	Petersburg (гос. публ. библиотека)		1	16.9 x 40 cm		Ostrižak.	IzSt (2008; on 322–323)
breviary?		1400s	Berčićevo sobranje fragmenata I, 49 (old 80)	Petersburg (гос. публ. библиотека)		1			Acquired by Berčić in Sutomišćica.	IzSt (2008; on 465–466, bottom)
		1400s	Berčićevo sobranje fragmenata II, 28–46	Petersburg (гос. публ. библиотека)		19	19.3 x 13.5 cm	1 co 28 ro	Traktat o krštenju i o ispovijedi za popove; O ženidbi. Includes note dated 1692 and an 18th-century note on f. 45a.	IzSt (2008; on 247–283)
		1400s	Ms 2052	NUK		4			Brevir (štirje kratki odlomki – berila, September).	DSK
		1400s	XIV B 50	Rijeka (Naučnja biblioteka)		3			Tri ostriška glagoljičkoga štiva. Used in the cover of a 1661 copy of Francisco Sacchino, Historiae Societatis Iesu pars quinta. That book was acquired by the library of the Jesuits of Rijeka in 1662. A fourth strip was discovered by Deković.	
breviary		?	Ms 2055	NUK		3			Brevir (Proprium de tempore na dan sv. Tomaža Becketa 29. 12.). Once part of a cover.	DSK
breviary		1400s	Ms 2044	NUK		2			Parchment.	DSK
breviary		?	Ms 2053 (Glagolitica, Mapa 1, S.f. 51)	NUK		1			Jobova knjiga. Once used as a cover for a register of the Vinica parish, where it was found by Oton Brkopec while a gymnasium student in Novo Mesto. Separated on 1 January 1926. Microfilm in Zagreb in 1989. Bibliography:	DSK, IzSt (2017 from NUK)
ritual	RitAc	1400s	I a 60	Arhiv HAZU	Croatia	18	16.3 x 11.5 cm	1 co 24 ro	Akademijin krnji ritual (Academy abridged ritual). Bibliography:	IzSt (2008)
ritual		1400s	Fragm. glag. 39	Arhiv HAZU		1	30 x 20.3 cm	2 co 35 ro	List rituala (pogrebni obred). Contains sprovod. Acquired by Kukuljević from cover of the Senjski statut (Kuk. 535) in Senj.	
calendar		1400s	Fragm. glag. 34	Arhiv HAZU		1	27 x 19.5 cm		List kalendara. Includes 1532 note by priest Ivan -rić (Botrić?) who was made chaplain of sv. Lucija that year. Acquired by Kukuljević in Dubašnica where it was being used for the cover of the book Donatus ad Lectorem Venetiis 1627.	
		1400s	IV d 55	Arhiv HAZU		10	12.7 x 9.7 cm		Magijski zapisi i recepti. Once belonged to Mate Benković and was bound to IV d 56 (which was written earlier). Inherited by Andrija Benković and later Ivan Benković. From Grižane where the Benkovići lived it somehow got to JAZU. Two photographs in Štefanić 1970. Bibliography:	IzSt (2008)
homily		1400s	Fragm. glag. 105	Arhiv HAZU		1	14 x 6.3 cm		Komadić homilije.	
miscellany		1400s	Berčićevo sobranje fragmenata II, 106–107	Petersburg (гос. публ. библиотека)		2		2 co 25 ro	Dvolist propovijedi.	IzSt (2008; on 123–126)
miscellany		1400s	Berčićevo sobranje fragmenata II, 52, 53	Petersburg (гос. публ. библиотека)		2		1 co	Dvolist traktata o sedam smrtnih grijeha. Acquired by Berčić on 23 March 1864 from F. Buić at Glavotok.	IzSt (2008; on 233–235)
miscellany		1400s	Berčićevo sobranje fragmenata II, 47–50	Petersburg (гос. публ. библиотека)		3			Odlomak dvolista lucidara. Acquired by Berčić 1859 from F. Buić at Glavotok.	IzSt (2008; on 237–238, 243–246)
missal		1400s		Vrbnik (knjižnica "Vitezić")		1	23 x 16 cm		List misala. Similar script to the Bribirski misal in Arhiv HAZU.	
missal		1400s		Vrbnik (knjižnica "Vitezić")		1	25 x 17 cm		List misala. Initials similar to the Bribirski misal in Arhiv HAZU.	
		1400s		Punat (župnik)	Punat	1			Jedan list misala. At house of parish priest Antun Toljanić during Štefanić 1960.	
breviary		1400s		Krk (arhiv samostana trećoredaca)	Krk	2	25 x 14 cm	2 co	Dvolist brevijara.	
		1400s		Krk (arhiv bivšeg Staroslavenskog instituta)		4	28.2 x 21 cm	2 co 34 ro	Dva dvolista brevijara. Parchment. Includes Proprium sanctorum.	
breviary		1400s	Fragm. glag. 11 (Kuk. 554)	Arhiv HAZU		5	25 x 18 cm		Dodatak brevijaru i misalu: Službe na pohođenje Marijino. Includes notes, among which several abecedaries from the 15th-16th and in 2 cases maybe 17th centuries. The middle abecedary on f. 1v and the first on f. 2v are especially notable for their similarity to the abecedary in the Radosav Miscellany. Eventually it came to Rome. Kukuljević acquired it from Rome.	
breviary		1400s	Fragm. glag. 21/a	Arhiv HAZU		1	13.5 x 10.3 cm		Komadić lista brevijara. Contains Proprium de tempore.	
breviary		1400s	Fragm. glag. 21 d/II	Arhiv HAZU		1	7.4 x 4 cm		Sitan ostrižak brevijara. Acquired in Grobnik in the 19th century.	
breviary		1400s	Fragm. glag. 27	Arhiv HAZU		1	15.5 x 20.2 cm		Komad lista brevijara (iz Judite).	
missal		1400s		Krk (arhiv bivšeg Staroslavenskog instituta)		10	28 x 21.5 cm	2 co	Kvinteran misala. Parchment.	
missal		1400s		Krk (arhiv bivšeg Staroslavenskog instituta)		6	21.5 x 16 cm	2 co	Šest listova misala. Parchment.	
missal		1400s		Krk (arhiv bivšeg Staroslavenskog instituta)	Dubašnica?, Vantačići	2	23.5 x 15 cm	2 co	Dvolist misala. Includes Proprium sanctorum. Includes cursive notes possibly from 17th century on f. 1r and 2v including mention of Vantačići, a village and family near Dubašnica. Parchment.	
missal		1400s		Krk (arhiv bivšeg Staroslavenskog instituta)		2	25.2 x 18.4 cm	2 co	Dvolist misala. Includes Mark 14:36-28, sung on Great Tuesday. Parchment.	
missal		1400s		Krk (arhiv bivšeg Staroslavenskog instituta)		1	23 x 20.5 cm	2 co	List misala. Includes Proprium sanctorum. Parchment.	
missal		1400s		Krk (arhiv bivšeg Staroslavenskog instituta)		1	24.4 x 20 cm	2 co	Krnji list misala. Includes Proprium de tempore. Parchment.	
missal		1400s		Košljun	Košljun	1	27.6 x 19.6 cm	2 co	Košljunski list misala.	
		1400s		Vrbnik (župni ured)	Vrbnik	1	37.3 x 26 cm	2 co 27 ro	List brevijara. Possibly from BrVb_{3}. Parchment.	
missal		1400s	Fragm. glag. 37/d	Arhiv HAZU		1	24 x 16.5 cm	2 co	Jedan list misala. Includes Proprium de tempore. Once used as cover of a book in the library of the Capuchin Monastery of Rijeka. Includes later note about a deceased Franić Paialić. The surname Pajalić is known from Baška. Bibliography:	
miscellany	COxf_{2}	1400s (1448?)	Ms. Canon. Lit. 414	Bodleian Library	Croatia	68			Drugi oxfordski zbornik (Second Oxford miscellany). There is a date 1480 given in the text. Tadin deciphered 1448 on the first page but du Feu could not find it. In the possession of archdeacon Matija Sović of Osor, who gave it to A. Fortis. In Italy, Canonici acquired it, and the British Library acquired the Canonici collection in 1817. Photocopy in Zagreb by 1977. Bibliography:	DB (23 August 2022), WM (from DB), NSK (from DB)
miscellany		1400s	Fragm. glag. 6 a, b, c	Arhiv HAZU					Tri sitna odlomka jednog zbornika.	
miscellany		1400s	Fragm. glag. 28	Arhiv HAZU		2	16.5 x 12.5 cm		Dvolist zbornika. Possibly written in Lika (where Kolunićev zbornik was also written). Text closer to Kolunićev than to Ivančićev. Likely acquired by Kukuljević.	
breviary		1400s	Berčićevo sobranje fragmenata II, 1	Petersburg (гос. публ. библиотека)		1	16.5 x 10.5 cm		Ostrišci.	IzSt (2008; on 334–335)
breviary?		1400s	Berčićevo sobranje fragmenata II, 2	Petersburg (гос. публ. библиотека)		1	16.3 x 44 cm		Ostrišci.	IzSt (2008; on 332–333)
missal		1400s (beginning)	Berčićevo sobranje fragmenata II, 3	Petersburg (гос. публ. библиотека)		1	23.8 x 62 cm	1 co 28 ro	Ostrišci.	IzSt (2008; on 330–331)
breviary		1400s	Berčićevo sobranje fragmenata I, 84, 85	Petersburg (гос. публ. библиотека)		2	27.2 x 20.2 cm	2 co 30 ro	Belonged to don Giovanni Gellenovich curate in Opatija in 1857. The name of don Nicolo Bernich in Dobrinj is also written in it. Acquired by Berčić 7 November 1863 from a certain Kirinčić in Dobrinj.	IzSt (2008; on 309–402)
miscellany		1400s	Canonici collection	Oxford (Bodleian)	Lika	68			Zbornik duhovnog štiva. Purchased by Ivan Fugošić of Vrbnik. Acquired by Matej Sović who gave it to Alberto Fortis. Came to Oxford with Canonici collection in 1817.	
miscellany		1400s	Berčićevo sobranje fragmenata II, 15–17	Petersburg (гос. публ. библиотека)		3	23 x 15 cm	1 co 36 ro	Lucidar. Folio 15 includes note "Pietro Millotich". Folia 16-17 acquired by Berčić from Buić of Glavotok 1864 and include note "Luigi Barbaglich de Casiole".	IzSt (2008; on 304–309)
miscellany		1400s	Berčićevo sobranje fragmenata II, 18–27	Petersburg (гос. публ. библиотека)		10	27 x 18.5 cm		Continues II br. 16. Includes note "S. Cassiano".	IzSt (from 283 to 303)
missal	Fg(M)I-2	1400s	Glagolitica I-2	HDA		2	30.5 x 21 cm	2 co	Includes Assumption and antiphon of Saint Augustine.	
missal		1400s		Vrbnik (Ivan Volarić library)	Vrbnik	1	23 x 17 cm		List misalića. Parchment.	
breviary	BrLab_{2} (BrBer_{2})	1400s	Ms 163 (old C 163a/2)	National and University Library of Slovenia	Croatia	264+176	30 x 20.5–21 cm	2 co x 33 ro	Drugi ljubljanski (Beramski) brevijar. Second Ljubljana (Beram) breviary. Used in Beram in Istria. Microfilm made by 1978 (Star. inst. for volume I: M 1, M2; for volume II: M 3). Bibliography:	DSK (22 December 2014), NSK, GHR, IzSt (I: 2017 from NUK), IzSt (II: 2016 from NUK)
breviary	BrRom	1400s	Arch. Cap. S. Pietro, D215 (or D.215 or D 215)	Vatican Library	Croatia	2+438+2	16 x 12.5 cm	1 co 22 ro	Rimski brevijar (Roman breviary, Brevijar iz Arhiva sv. Petra u Rimu). Microfilm copies F 7 at NSK and G-32 (ZM 56/20) at HDA. Photocopy F 195 made for Staroslavenski institut in 1981. Bibliography:	DVL, IzSt (2008)
breviary		1400s	Fragm. glag. 92/a-b	Arhiv HAZU		2	20 x 8 cm		Odlomak brevijara (negativan otisak).	
breviary		1400s	Fragm. glag. 94	Arhiv HAZU		1	22.3 x 19.2 cm		List brevijara. Given to JAZU in the time of Milčetić. At base of f. 2d there is a note from a Latinic hand, possibly Radoslav Lopašić.	
		1400s		Vrbnik (župni ured)	Vrbnik	1	35.4 x 19 cm		List pergamene sa zapisima. Parchment. According to Milčetić it was once on the back cover of BrVb_{3}. Separated by 1951.	
breviary	Fg(Br)Tht	1400s		Zentralarchiv des Deutschen Ordens					Breviary fragment of the Teutonic Order.	
triodion	TrMDA	1400s	ф. 173, MDA collection No 116	RGB-Moskva	Russia	187			Cyrillic but on folio 185 there is Cyrillic paratext with Glagolitic cryptographic writing employing letter Onъ.	
miscellany		1400s	Berčićevo sobranje fragmenata II, 15	Petersburg (гос. публ. библиотека)	Glavotok	1			Odlomak zbornika (tumačenje zapovijedi božjih i Lucidar).	
		1400s	Berčićevo sobranje fragmenata II, 16+17	Petersburg (гос. публ. библиотека)	Glavotok	2			Odlomak legende. Possibly from same hand as Berčić collection II, 15.	
horologion		1400s	R 4029	NSK	Croatia	2	21 x 14 cm		Glagoljski časoslov.	NSK, GHR
missal	MLab_{2} (MBer_{2})	1400s (first half)	Ms 164 (C 164a/2)	National and University Library of Slovenia		196	30 x 21 cm	2 co x 32 ro	Drugi ljubljanski (beramski) misal. Second Ljubljana (Beram) missal. Initials by two separate hands. Once belonged to Sigismund Zois. Bibliography:	DSK, IzSt (from NUK)
missal	MMet	1400s	MR 180	Metropolitan Library of the Roman Catholic Archdiocese of Zagreb		63	17.5 x 12.5 cm	1 co, 2 co x 27-29 ro	Metropolitanski misal (Metropolitan missal, Vrbnički Mali misal, Misalić). Written in 3 hands. Located in Vrbnik until 1680 when the parishioner there gave it to the priest Andrija Benković of Grižane.	NSK, GHR, IzSt (2008)
missal	MN	1400s	n/a, R-62a (Sef N* 1)	Novi Vinodolski parish library, Rijeka		188	32 x 22 cm	2 co	Novljanski misal (Novi missal). Two leaves are kept in Rijeka. One is the Novljanski odlomak misala, discovered 1984 in Novi Vinodolski. The other is R-62a, discovered by Milan Mihaljević. Bibliography:	IzSt (2009)
missal		1400s	VII H 7 (inv. br. D-4766/1960)	Rijeka (Sveučilišna knjižnica)		1	13.5 x ? cm		Discovered in the back cover of the 1675 book Principia et documenta vitae christianae. Photocopies and a CD were made in Zagreb in February 2000 but it had not yet been separated so only one side was visible.	GHR [part.], IzSt (2009) [part.]
missal	MNY (MNew)	1400s	M. 931 (M 931)	Morgan Library & Museum	Zadar (vicinity)	293	28 x 19.5 cm	2 co	New York missal (Newyorški misal, Njujorški misal). Brought in 1966 from the collection of Thomas Phillipps in London following its sale at Sotheby's auction, lot 162, on 29 November 1966. Facsimile published 1977 in Munich-Zagreb as The New York Missal (around that time the microfilm Film br. 22/2 now at the Državni arhiv u Karlovcu and the photocopy F 82 at the Staroslavenski institut were made). Images. Critical edition. Bibliography:	
missal		1400s	Fragm. glag. 10	Arhiv HAZU		1	15.5 x 13 cm	2 co	Komad lista misala. Includes Proprium de tempore for Epiphany. Once a cover of a copy of the 1702 book Nauk krstjanski. Acquired by Kukuljević on the island of Krk from Porat gvardijan Turcić. Parchment.	
missal		1400s	Fragm. glag. 19	Arhiv HAZU		2	21 x 12 cm		Odlomak misalića. 1 bifolium in 4 pieces. Originally part of a small missal.	
missal		1400s	Fragm. glag. 21/c	Arhiv HAZU		3			Tri sitna odlomka misala.	
missal		1400s	Fragm. glag. 30/c-d	Arhiv HAZU		2	19.6 x 12.5 cm	2 co 33 ro	Dva lista misala. Once used for a book cover.	
missal	Fg(M)J37/a	1400s	Fragm. glag. 37/a	Arhiv HAZU / NSK	Croatia	2	24.5 x 21.5/13.5 cm	2 co	Krnji dvolist misala JAZU 37/a. Acquired by Kukuljević from Capuchin Monastery in Rijeka. Some parts lost already by Milčetić.	NSK/GHR – correct scans?
missal		1400s	Fragm. glag. 38/b-c	Arhiv HAZU		1	20.5 x 16 cm		Dva komada lista misala. Includes a late 17th century note by Ioanne Couglaneo vic.o Generale. The surname Kovljaneo and variants is from Brač. Acquired by Kukuljević in Zvečanj (Poljica)	
missal		1400s	Fragm. glag. 47	Arhiv HAZU		1	19.5 x 19 cm		Komad lista misala. Kukuljević acquired it in Prvić (Šibenik) and/or from a certain Lovrecich, probably 1849. Parchment.	
missal		1400s	Fragm. glag. 50	Arhiv HAZU		1	25.9 x 16.5 cm		List misala.	
missal		1400s	Fragm. glag. 52	Arhiv HAZU		1	15.5 x 10 cm	2 co	Komad lista misala. Served as cover for copy of Divković's Nauk karstjanski from Porat (Dubašnica). Acquired by Kukuljević. Parchment.	
missal		1400s	Fragm. glag. 58	Arhiv HAZU		1	26.3 x 9.9 cm		Odlomak lista misala. Parchment.	
missal		1400s	Fragm. glag. 61	Arhiv HAZU		1	26.6 x 20.2 cm	2 co 30 ro	Dvolist misala. Acquired by Kukuljević in Croatian/Austrian Primorje.	
missal		1400s	Fragm. glag. 65	Arhiv HAZU		2	27.8 x 19.5 cm	2 co 28 ro	Dvolist misala. Acquired by Kukuljević in Croatian/Austrian Primorje. Parchment.	
missal		1400s	Fragm. glag. 71	Arhiv HAZU		1	20.5 x 16.2 cm	2 co 32 ro	List misala. Includes later notes, including one by a Franciscan student whose name began with Ka-. Acquired by Kukuljević.	
missal		1400s	Fragm. glag. 83	Arhiv HAZU		1	20.5 x 14.5 cm		List misala. Includes Proprium sanctorum. Includes Latinic note 24 September 1877 by fra Bonaventura Depiera of the monastery in Martinšćica on Cres. Parchment.	
missal		1400s	Fragm. glag. 91	Arhiv HAZU		16	21 x 16 cm		Osam krnjih dvolistova misala. Separated from the covers of old books by Kukuljević or one of his coworkers.	
missal		1400s	Fragm. glag. 96	Arhiv HAZU		2	15.5 x 9.8 cm		Dvolist misalića (sakrifikala). Acquired by the Mažuranić family. Parchment.	
miscellany		1400s	R 4902	NSK	Croatia	43	21 x 16 cm	2 co	Teološki priručnik župnika glagoljaša. Bought by NSK in 1976 from the Thomas Phillipps collection in London following purchase at the 28–29 June 1976 auction lot 4040 at Sotheby's.	NSK
breviary	CodKop	1400s	Cod. Kop. 22	National and University Library of Slovenia	Croatia	177+152	18 x 12 cm	2 co x 24-25 ro	Ljubljanski misal-brevijar iz Kopitarove zbirke (Ljubljana missal-breviary of the Kopitar collection). Also contains a psalter.	DSK, IzSt (2017)
ritual		1400s				16			Dio rituala. Found in Vrbnik. Lost as of 1960.	
legal		1400s		Arhiv HAZU	Dobrinj	1	20 x 19 cm	1 co	Ambroz plovan Dobrinjski zida i daruje crkvu Sv. Ambroza u Dobrinju, na otoku Krku. Acquired by Kukuljević Sakcinski. A 15th century transcript of the original dated 8 November 1321 (written by Dobrinj općina scribe Rumin, the first name known in such a role). Original may have survived as late as Kukuljević but Bratulić did not find it.	
breviary	Fg(Br)Bass	1400s	N I 2:148b	Basel University Library		1	21.5 x 8.7 cm		Baselski odlomak brevijara (Basel breviary fragment). Acquired by Franz Miklosich. Given to the Basel Antiquities Collection, which became the Basel Historical Museum. Bibliography:	eCod (25 June 2015), EU, IzSt (2021)
breviary	Fg(Br)NM	1400s	63 R/6	Kapiteljski arhiv, Novo Mesto	Croatia	1	34.5 x 26 cm	2 co x 36 ro	Odlomak brevijara iz Novoga Mesta (Novo Mesto breviary fragment).	
breviary	Fg(Br)Sal	1400s	Berčić Collection	Russian National Library	Croatia	1	30 x 20.7 cm	2 co x 41 ro	Saljski odlomak brevijara (Sali breviary fragment). Found by Ivan Berčić in Sali. Not to be confused with the 13th/14th century Saljski brevijar and Zaglavski brevijar, which survive only in the Latin translation of M. Karaman.	
missal	Fg(Mi)Dub_{1}	1400s		Arhiv HAZU		1			Prvi dubašljanski odlomak misala (First Dubašnica missal fragment).	
missal	Fg(Mi)Dub_{2}	1400s		Arhiv HAZU		1			Drugi dubašljanski odlomak misala (Second Dubašnica missal fragment). The leaf is fragmentary.	
missal	Fg(Mi)Dub_{3}	1400s		Arhiv HAZU		1			Treći dubašljanski odlomak misala (Third Dubašnica missal fragment).	
missal	Fg(M)Wer	1400s		Löwenstein-Wertheim Gemeinschaftliches Archiv	Croatia				Fragment of missal. Described by Böhm 1959, Das Wertheimer glagolitische Fragment.	
nomocanon		1400s	1117	NBKM	Bulgaria	57			Cyrillic with 2 partly Glagolitic numbers on folia 9r and 11r.	
miscellany	CCM (CCom)	1400s	Sinodalna collection No 316	GIM-Moskva	Russia	368			Miscellany with mixed contents. Cyrillic with Glagolitic additions on folio 2r (formerly 18r).	
miscellany	CTSL	1400s	ф. 304.I (Troicko-Sergieva lavra) No 762	RNB-Moskva	Russia	284			Cyrillic with Glagolitic notes on folia 21r and 44r. The first part of the manuscript contains Russian works, the second Bulgarian translations from Greek.	
miscellany	CBč	1400s	F. 67, No. 5 (or Bč5 or Bč 5 or Bč. 5)	National Library of Russia	Croatia				Zbornik u Berčićevoj zbirci (Berčić miscellany). Bibliography:	NLR, IzSt (2010), IzSt (2008)
korizmenjak	QPort	1460	Ms 639-14-3-12	Municipal Library of Porto	Croatia				Portski korizmenjak. Donated by Alberto Fortis to his friend G. Brunelli at Bologna. Photocopy (F 262) at Staroslavenski institut made in 2003.	
amulet	Amul	1400s	Vat. Slav. 11	Vatican Library	Croatia				Amulet of the type Sisin i Mihael.	
missal	CČrt	1400s/1500s	Чертк. 387	State Historical Museum of Russia	Russia	17	16 x 12 cm	1 co	Missal containing glagolitic prayers. Described by A. Nazor in 1970.	[partial scan]
psalter		1400s	1 D c 1/9	Prague (National Museum)	Croatia/Prague	1	21 x 16.3 cm	2 co 21 ro (originally)	Zlomek čtení z chorvatsko-hlaholského žaltáře. Not part of the Emayzský breviár̆ni žaltár or of 1/22. Includes Ps 1:1-6, 2:1-6. Once used in the cover of an unknown book. Discovered in Písek by a certain "prefekt" Schön around 1830. Photograph of part of 1 page in Čermak 2020. Bibliography:	
miscellany		1400s?	Berčićevo sobranje br. 5	Petersburg (гос. публ. библиотека)	Zadar area	78	15.7 x 12 cm		Berčićev zbornik, Petrogradski zbornik. Bibliography:	
miscellany	CCH	1400s (mid to) / 1500s (early)	463	Hilandar Monastery	Serbia	97			Miscellany with mixed contents (Сборник със смесено съдържание). Cyrillic with Glagolitic letter Dobro on f87v and f89v.	
missal		1400s?	Berčićevo sobranje fragmenata II, 90–91	Petersburg (гос. публ. библиотека)		2		2 co 30 ro	Acquired by Berčić in Splitske Poljice; 91 bears the finding-note "Dom. XIX p. Pentec".	IzSt (2008; on 159–166)
breviary		1400s?	R 4299	NSK		1			Fragment glagoljskoga brevijara.	
octoechos		1400s/1500s?	III.a.45-46	HAZU-Zagreb	Bulgaria	203			Bitola octoechos (Битолски изборен октоих). Manuscript from 1200s, but mixed Cyrillic-Glagolitic paratext from possibly 15th-16th century.	
rule		1400s/1500s	IV a 91	Arhiv HAZU	Kvarner?	90	15 x 10.5 cm		Franjevačke konstitucije (Martinove). Conforms to the rule of 1430. May date to the period around or after 1492 specifically, when the Dalmatian province of the order received their constitution. Probably acquired by Ivan Berčić. One photograph in Štefanić 1970. Bibliography:	
rule		1400s/1500s	Fragm. glag. 120	Arhiv HAZU		2		2 co	Odlomak redovničkih konstitucija. Acquired by Josip Hamm who gave them to Arhiv JAZU in 1958.	
miscellany		1400s/1500s	Fragm. glag. 134	Arhiv HAZU		1	19 x 14 cm		List zbornika. Written in an ikavo-ekavian area. Note by Barić Fugošić made in Vrbnik. Acquired by priest Mate Oršić in Vrbnik. Oršić gave it to Štefanić in Krk 1931. Štefanić gave it to Arhiv JAZU 1948.	
16 prophets		1400s/1500s	f. 304.I (Troicko-Sergieva lavra) 89	RGB-Moskva	Russia	261			16 Prophets with commentary. Cyrillic with Glagolitic in titles and initials.	
16 prophets		1400s/1500s	Muzejnoe collection No 4094	RGB-Moskva	Russia	420			16 Prophets with commentary. Glagolitic in titles (folia 59v, 61v, 69v, 86v) and initials (>25 examples).	
dialogue	DiKož	1400s/1500s	II b 106 (Kuk. 327)	Arhiv HAZU		23	26 x 16.4 cm		Dijalog Grgura pape (kožljački). Dialogues of Pope Gregory I. On paper from the period 1472–1485. Fol. 1-4 probably written in the last years of the 15th century and f. 6-23 somewhat afterwards. Includes a ledger in one hand and then notes from 1491 in another hand, then in a third hand from 1513 on by a priest Andrija who likely also wrote the main text of the chronicle. But before the text was written the book had been a ledger belonging to Jurg who was probably the son of lord Martin Mojsejević but when his father Martin died the note was left empty, followed by the 1491 note. The resulting chronicle is of historical significance. The main text was also written, at some time in the late 15th or early 16th century, and in the 16th century it arrived in Vrbnik where it remained until the visit of Kukuljević in 1854, who received the manuscript from Josip Anton Petriš. Paper. Two photographs in Štefanić 1970. Microfilm at HAZU made by 1952. Bibliography:	
		1400s/1500s (or early 1500s)	III a 19 (Kuk. 447)	Arhiv HAZU		130	19.5 x 14 cm		Korizmenjak ("Knjige svetago Brnardina"). Scribe: mostly hand A, also hand B f. 24 and 26, hand C ff. 37–38, hand D f. 45v and 51, hand E on f. 77. Dialect Čakavian with some Kajkavisms. Precise path of acquisition debated. One photograph in Štefanić 1970. Bibliography:	
Planctus Mariae		1400s/1500s	VII 160	Arhiv HAZU	Croatia	27	15 x 10 cm		Plač majke božje. In Vrbnik from the early 17th century. Given by will of 20 November 1672 from Ivan Stašić to his son Anton Stašić. Entered JAZU in 1959 through archive of Jerko Gršković. One photograph in Štefanić 1970.	
		1400s/1500s		Krk (arhiv bivšeg Staroslavenskog instituta)		88	20 x 13.5 cm		Antoninov konfesional (Summula confessionis) by bishop Antonin (1389–1459). One type of paper used includes watermark dated 1452–1453. Paper.	
		1400s/1500s		Krk (arhiv bivšeg Staroslavenskog instituta)		110	23.3 x 17 cm		Kvadriga duhovnim zakonom. Paper. One hand for text. Paratext includes notes by other hands: knez Paval Kovačić on f. 95v, Matiaš Poserniak in 1561 on f. 62v, domin Juraj Malčinić on f. 86 and f. 89v in 1577, unknown on f. 92v. Inside the book is a paper written 18 June 1642 by santiz Petar Starčić.	
		1400s-1700s	R 4040	NSK		17			Fragmenti glagoljskih rukopisa različitoga sadržaja iz 15. do 18. st. Contains 4 numbers. Parchment and paper.	
