= Greblo's quaresimal =

15th-century collection of sermons by Simon Greblo

Quaresimal
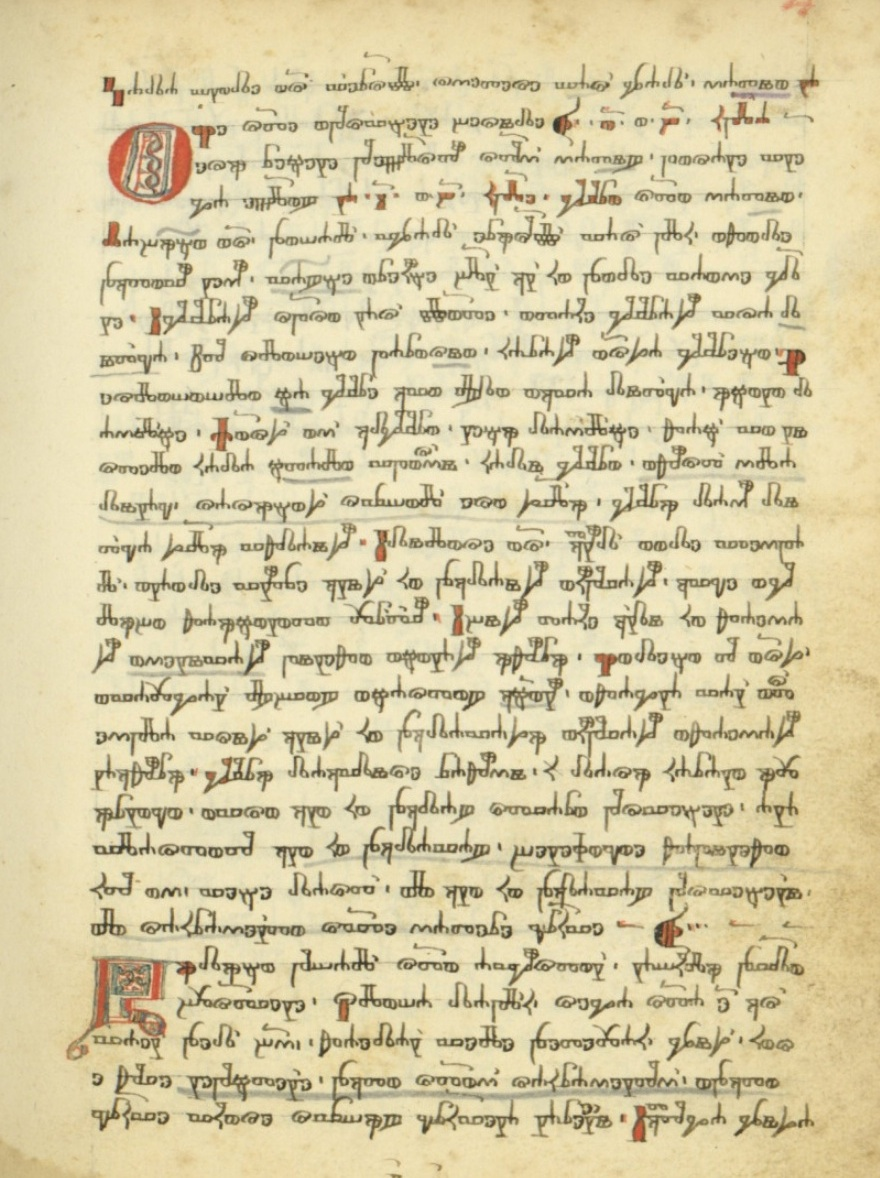
- Page 14 from the Quaresimal
- Created: 1498
- Location: National and University Library, Zagreb
- Author: Simon Greblo
- Purpose: Glagolitic collection of sermons

Greblo's quaresimal (Croatian: Greblov kvaresimal) is a 15th-century collection of sermons written in the Glagolitic alphabet by Croatian priest Simon Greblo.

== History ==
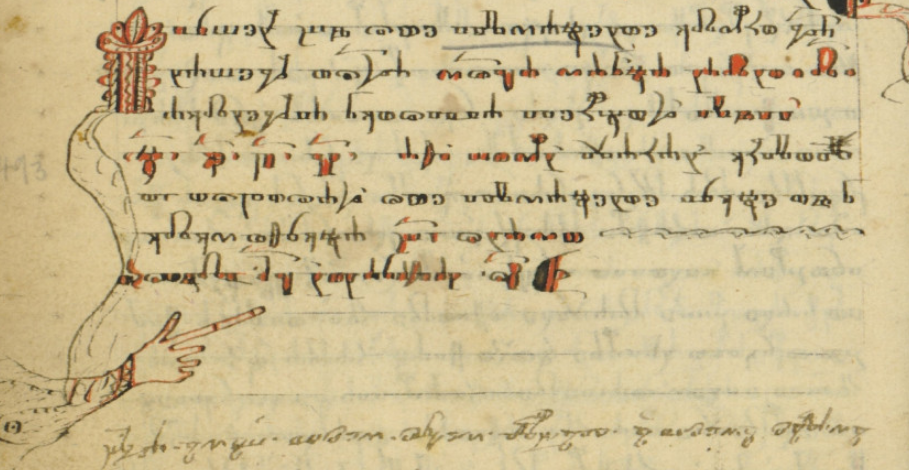
Final note in Greblo's Quaresimal

This liturgical book was written in Roč by the local calligrapher and Glagolitic priest Simon Greblo. Greblo is a scribe about whom only scant biographical data survive. He was born and died in Roč. He wrote the Interpretation of the Passion of our Lord Jesus Christ while still a deacon in March 1493 (completed on March 5, 1493). That same year he was ordained; and produced the Spiritual Quadriga (Kvadrigu duhovnu), a translation of a treatise on moral theology by Italian Franciscan Nicholas of Osimo, which Greblo probably both transcribed and translated. The Quaresimal was completed by Greblo five years later, in 1498.

== Description ==
This work is a collection of sermons for Lent (Latin: Quadragesima, 'Fortieth'), and is based on the popular work by Neapolitan 15th-century Franciscan preacher Roberto Caracciolo. According to the glagoljaši, the Kvaresimal was made on the basis of an Italian template based on a sermon by Bernardin of Siena. In a colophon, Greblo says that he finished this work with his son-in-law Mihovil (Kalc) from Boljun. The work thematically follows Greblo's first work, the Interpretation of the Passion of our Lord Jesus Christ. Greblo's calligraphy in this work is remarkable. The style is modest, and the book is hardly illuminated. Only the initials have modest decorations in red or black-red. There are empty spaces at the end of the chapters that are filled with vignettes, in the form of "braids and rubrication made in red." The binding was restored in 1959.

== See also ==
- Angular Glagolitic
- Interpretation of the Passion of our Lord Jesus Christ
- List of Glagolitic manuscripts (1400–1499)
- Lists of Glagolitic manuscripts
