= Žakan Juri =

Croatian deacon

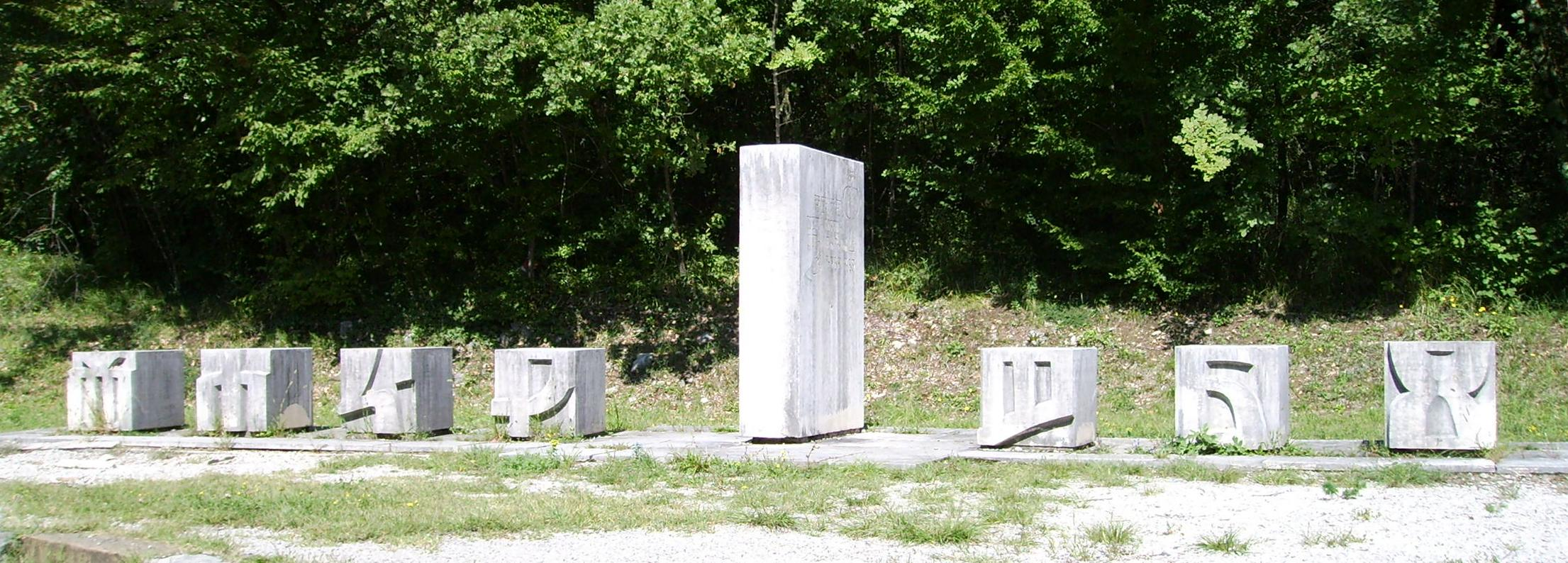
- Žakan Juri's stone in the Glagolitic Alley
- Born: second half of the 15th century Roč
- Died: late 15th century or early 16th century Roč
- Occupations: Transcriber, translator
- Writing career
- Language: Croatian, Latin

Žakan Juri (also Juraj, Jurij) (late 15th century - beginning of the 16th century), was a Croatian Glagolitic deacon and herald of the first Croatian printed book.

== Biography ==
Žakan means deacon in Croatian. Little is known about Žakan Juri. We known that he was from Roč, based on a note written by himself. His name is associated with one of the most important items in Croatian history, the first printed book. In 1482 he made a record on the last page of the original manuscript used as the principal model for the first Croatian book, the Missal of Prince Novak of Krbava (written much earlier, in 1368, and today at the Austrian National Library), in the Istrian town of Izola (today in Slovenia), expressing his satisfaction with the forthcoming publication of the first Croatian incunabula:

Vita, vita, štampa naša gori gre!
Tako ja oću, da naša gori gre!
1482. miseca ijuna 20., ... dni.
To bje pisano v grade Izule.
To pisa Juri, Žakan iz Roča,
Bog mu pomagaj i vsem ki mu
dobro ote.

English:

Vita, vita, our press is on the go!
That's how I want it to be on the go!
June 20, 1482.
This was written in the town of Izola.
This is what Juri, Žakan from Roč, wrote,
God help him and whoso
wish him well.

Žakan was one of the priests who edited the first printed Croatian book, and he probably wrote down this note on the original manuscript en route to "their" printing press. He was in Izola six months before the missal was published.

Croatian Glagolitic writers and copyists welcomed Gutenberg's invention of the printing press. Only 28 years after Gutenberg's first edition of the Bible, the Missal was prepared for print in Istria. Realized in Glagolitic and edited by the Istrian priests, it was most likely printed in Kosinj. It is the first printed book in Croatian.

Such texts and records of Croatian Glagolitic authors full of spontaneity, realism and wisdom encouraged the establishment of the Small Glagolitic Academy (Male glagoljaške akademije) in Roč, which bears the name of Juraj Žakan in his honor. The ninth point in the Glagolitic Alley between Roč and Hum is called Odkorište Žakna Juraja. Some streets and squares in Istrian towns are named after him.

== Sources ==
- Zvonimir Kulundžić: Kosinj – kolijevka štamparstva slavenskog juga, Zagreb, 1960.
- Zvonimir Kulundžić: 500. obljetnica kosinjskog misala – prve hrvatske tiskanje knjige, Zagreb, 1983.
- T. Peruško: Istrian Croats published the first Croatian printed book. Rijeka Review, 1 (1952) 1, p. 16–18.
- V. Putanec: Zapis žakna Juraja u Novakovu misalu. Ibid., 3/4, p. 127–130.
- N. Žic: Glagolitic record from Izola. Istarska Danica, 1952, p. 76–78.
- Z. Kulundžić: About the place of printing this Missal. In: Missal by the Law of the Roman Court. (S. l.) 1483 (overprint Zagreb 1971, pp. LXIX – LXXIX). * A. Nazor: Open Questions About the Origin of the Missal from 1483. Ibid., P. LXXXI – LXXXIV.
- J. Bratulić: Aleja glagoljaša Roč – Hum. Zagreb — Pazin — Roč 1994, 63–73.
