= Simon Greblo =

Croatian priest

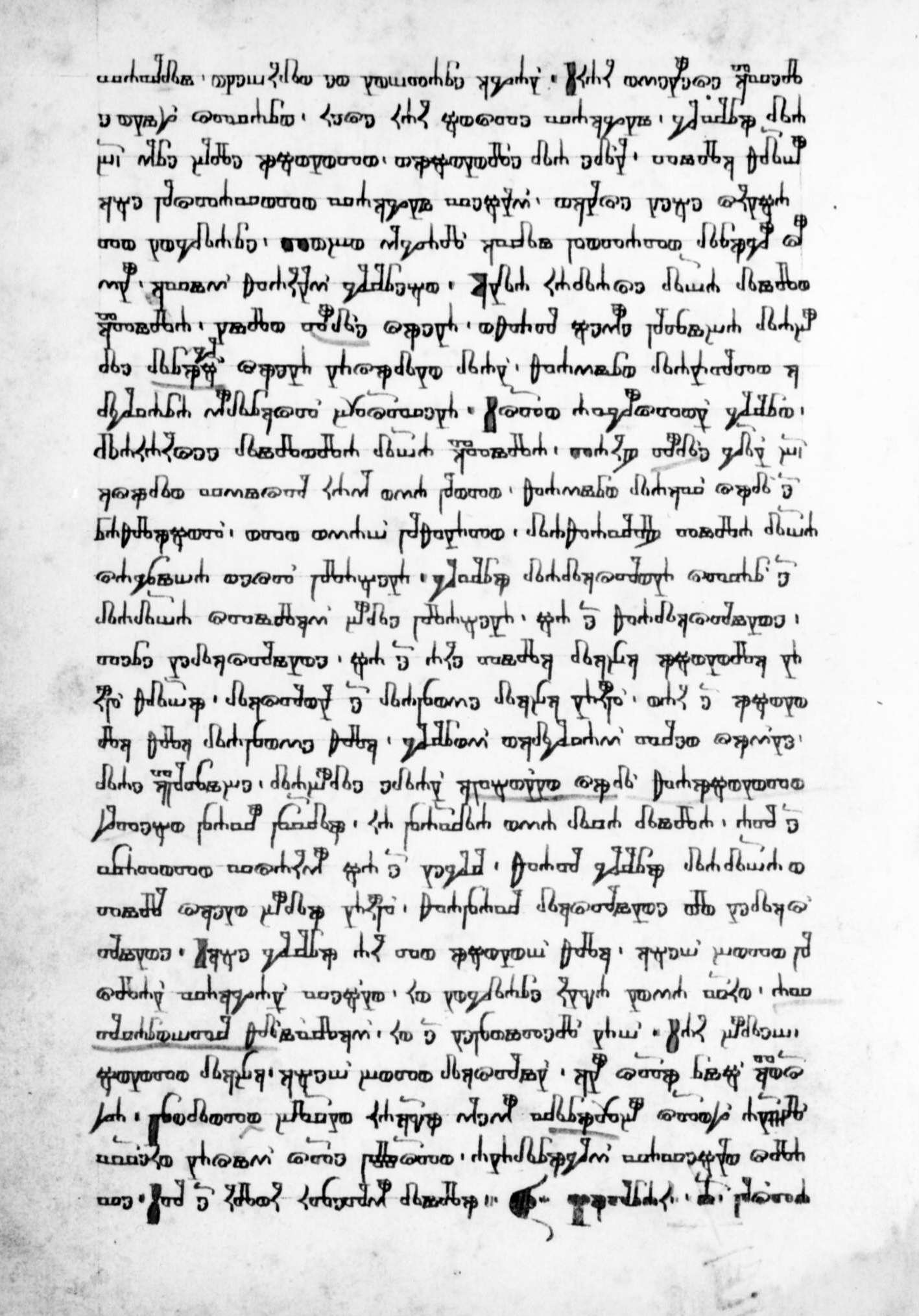
- Page from Greblo's Kvaresimal (Quaresimal)
- Born: ca. 1472; Roč
- Died: after 1539; Roč
- Occupations: Transcriber, translator, writer
- Writing career
- Language: Croatian, Latin
- Notable works: Interpretation of the Passion of our Lord Jesus Christ; Quaresimal

Simon Greblo (also Šimun Greblo, Simon Greblić) (ca. 1472 - after 1539) was a Croatian priest, intellectual, Glagolitic writer and scribe. He was one of the most noted connoisseurs of the Glagolitic alphabet at the end of the 15th century. Greblo is generally considered the brightest Croatian copyist of his day. His calligraphy has been especially praised. While not an original author, his knowledge of cultural and literary interests of the day, taste and acumen in making literary choices have been noted.

== Biography ==
Only scant biographical data on Greblo have survived. We know that he was born in Roč, at the time a center of Croatian culture in Istria. Greblo mentions that he was born in Roč in his Interpretation of the Passion of Our Lord Jesus Christ. Based on other documents, it may be concluded that he stayed his whole life in Roč, and that he died there. We don't know his year of birth, but, on the basis of notes recorded by Greblo, it is generally accepted by scholars that he was born in 1472. His name was recorded by the author himself in different ways; it varies from Simun, Simon to Šimun, and the surname changes from Greblo, Grbl to Greblić and Grblić (cf. Grbić into Garbitius). (Note: His name is recorded as Simun Greblo on the colophon of his translation Quadriga (1493), the Novak's Missal (1368), Quaresimal (1498), the Book of Accounts of the Brotherhood of St. Bartholomew (1523-1628); as Simon Greblo in the Book of Accounts; as Simon Grblo also in Quadriga; as Simun Grblić in the Breviary of Vid Omišljanin (1396); as Simun Greblić in Quaresimal and the Copenhagen Missal, and as Šimun Greblić in the Ročkom misalu (ca. 1420).) It is difficult to understand why the author played so much with his name at a phonological level.

His first known work in Glagolitic is the Interpretation of the Passion of our Lord Jesus Christ (Tlmačenie od muki Gospoda našego Isuhrsta), whose transcription was completed on 5 March 1493. It is a work of narrative prose read on Good Friday. In the same year he became a priest and transcribed his second work in Glagolitic, Kvadrigu duhovnu, a treatise on moral theology by the Italian Franciscan Nicholas of Osimo. Greblo's Kvadriga has only three parts, and the untranslated fourth indicates that the translation was based on a manuscript written before Osimo's Quadriga spirituale was printed (first edition 1470). Today the manuscript is kept at the Austrian National Library. It is unknown whether Greblo was a translator or just a transcriber.

Greblo's third known work is the manuscript Kvaresimal (Quaresimal), (sermons for Lent), which is textually similar to Žakan Broz Kolunić's Korizmenjaku (Lent). Greblo reported on the book, in Cyrillic in the colophon, that he wrote this work in 1498 with his son-in-law Mihovil (Kalc) from Boljun. This book, with Greblo's Interpretation of the Passion, was bound in one volume in 1516. It was inherited by Jerolim Greblo and sold in 1547 to the priest Matej Mejak. Today it is housed at the National and University Library in Zagreb. An attempt to establish that Greblo died in 1551 failed. He probably died shortly after the last entry in the account book of the Brotherhood of St. Bartholomew in 1529. The language of Greblo's texts is Chakavian, with a consistently carried out Liburnian Ekavization and rare Paleo-Slavicisms.

Greblo's name can be found in many Glagolitic texts that were in Roč in his time: the Missal of Ročka (1497), the Copenhagen Missal (1491), the Breviary of Vid Omišljanin (1503), Novak's Missal (1512). On the frescoes of the cemetery church of St. Jerome in Hum, it was reported in Glagolitic, (in Latin language): Ik fuit presbyter Simon de Roco. He managed the Brotherhood of St. Bartola in Roč and kept the fraternal books in Glagolitic from 1526 to 1533.

All his manuscripts are characterized by beautiful book italics, and he wrote equally beautifully in the Croatian type of Cyrillic. Only Greblo's Interpretation of the Passion of Our Lord Jesus Christ was published in print (edited by A. Zbogija Kiš, 2001).

== Works transribed and/or by Greblo ==
- Interpretation of the Passion of our Lord Jesus Christ (Tlmačenie od muki gospoda našego Isuhrsta) (1493)
- Spiritual Quadriga (Kvadriga duhovnim zakonom) (1493)
- Quaresimal (Lent) (Kvarezimal- Korizmenjak) (1498)

== Sources ==
- J. Gršković, Istrian Old Croatian Passion of the Cross from the XV. century, Horizon 69, 1928, 97;
- V. Štefanić, Glagolitic Manuscripts of the Island of Krk, Zagreb 1960;
- S. Graciotti, L'originale italiano delle glagolitiche Kvadrige duhovne di Veglia e di Vienna, Ricerche slavistiche, Roma 1963, 11;
- J. Bratulić, O hrvatskom književniku Šimunu Greblu, Istarski mozaik, 1969, 7 (same in Istarske književne teme, Pula 1987);
- A. Zbogija Kiš, Šimun Greblo and His Interpretation of the Passion of Christ (1493), with the edition of the text, Pazin 2001;
- D. Vlahov, Tko je bilo ročki plovan, pop glagoljaš preminuo 1551. godine ?, Nova Istra, 2003, 3–4.
