= Church Slavonic =

Liturgical language of Eastern Orthodox Church

- Church Slavic
- Црькъвьнословѣ́ньскъ ѩꙁꙑ́къ Церковнославѧ́нскїй ѧ҆зы́къ ⱌⱃⰽⰲⰰⱀⱁⱄⰾⱁⰲⱑⱀⱄⰽⱜ ⰵⰸⰻⰽⱜ ⱌⰹⱃⱏⰽⱏⰲⱏⱀⱁⱄⰾⱁⰲⱑⱀⱐⱄⰽⱏⰹ ⱗⰸⱏⰻⰽⱏ
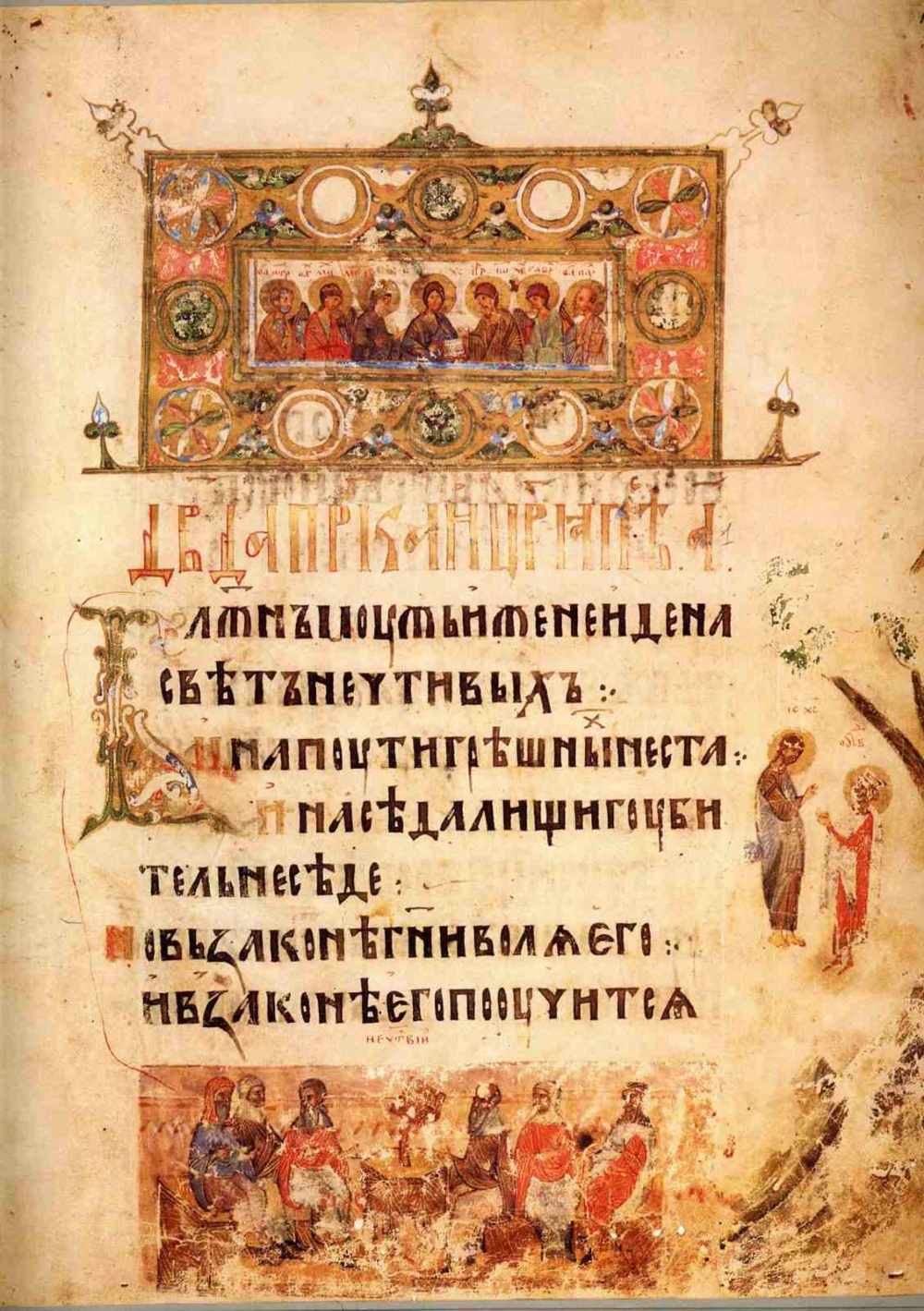
- Page from the Spiridon Psalter in Church Slavonic
- Region: Eastern and Southeast Europe
- Native speakers: None
- Language family: Indo-European: Balto-Slavic; Slavic; South Slavic; Eastern South Slavic; Church Slavonic
- Early form: Old Church Slavonic
- Writing system: Glagolitic alphabet Cyrillic alphabet

Language codes
- ISO 639-1: cu
- ISO 639-2: chu
- ISO 639-3: chu (includes Old Church Slavonic)
- Glottolog: chur1257 Church Slavic
- Linguasphere: 53-AAA-a

Church Slavonic (Note: Old Church Slavonic: црькъвьнословѣньскъ ѩзыкъ, romanized: crĭkŭvĭnoslověnĭskŭ językŭ, lit. 'Church-Slavonic language'; Russian Church Slavonic (cu-RU): Церковнославѣньскїй ѧзыкъ, romanized: Cerkovnoslavěnskij jazyk; Croatian Church Slavonic (cu-HR): ⱌⱃⰽⰲⰰⱀⱁⱄⰾⱁⰲⱑⱀⱄⰽⱜ ⰵⰸⰻⰽⱜ, romanized: crkavnoslověnskь jezikь; Czech Church Slavonic (cu-CZ): ⱌⰹⱃⱏⰽⱏⰲⱏⱀⱁⱄⰾⱁⰲⱑⱀⱐⱄⰽⱏⰹ ⱗⰸⱏⰻⰽⱏ, romanized: cirkevnoslověnskyj jazyk) (Note: Also known as Church Slavic, New Church Slavonic, New Church Slavic or just Slavonic (as it was called by its native speakers)) is a Slavic language belonging to the South-Slavic linguistic sub-branch of Balto-Slavic languages, in the Indo-European family. It is used, both historically and in the modern era, as a liturgical language by various Eastern Christian denominations. During medieval and early modern periods, it was also used as a literary language among Slavs. It stemmed from the Old Church Slavonic (9th-10th centuries), and later developed by adopting various regional and dialectal influences from local Slavic vernaculars, thus branching into several varieties, also called recensions, or redactions.

In its conservative form, that was standardized in the 18th century, it is used today by Eastern Orthodox churches in Belarus, Bosnia and Herzegovina, Bulgaria, Czechia and Slovakia, Croatia, North Macedonia, Montenegro, Poland, Russia, Serbia, Slovenia, and Ukraine. The language also appears in the services of the Russian Orthodox Church Outside of Russia, the American Carpatho-Russian Orthodox Diocese, and occasionally in the services of the Orthodox Church in America.

In addition, Church Slavonic is used by some churches which consider themselves Orthodox but are not in communion with the Orthodox Church, such as the Montenegrin Orthodox Church and the Russian True Orthodox Church. The Russian Old Believers and the Co-Believers also use Church Slavonic. The language is also used in some communities belonging to the Orthodox Church of Finland.

Church Slavonic is also used by Greek Catholic Churches in Slavic countries, for example the Croatian, Slovak, and Ruthenian Greek Catholics, as well as by the Roman Catholic Church (Croatian and Czech recensions).

In the past, Church Slavonic was also used by the Orthodox Churches in the Romanian lands until the late 17th and early 18th centuries, as well as by Roman Catholic Croats in the Early Middle Ages.

== Historical development ==
Church Slavonic represents a later stage of Old Church Slavonic, and is the continuation of the liturgical tradition introduced by two Thessalonian brothers, Saints Cyril and Methodius, in the late 9th century in Nitra, a principal town and religious and scholarly centre of Great Moravia (located in present-day Slovakia). There the first Slavic translations of the Scripture and liturgy from Koine Greek were made.

After the Christianization of Bulgaria in 864, Saint Clement of Ohrid and Saint Naum of Preslav were of great importance to the Eastern Orthodox faith and the Old Church Slavonic liturgy in the First Bulgarian Empire. The success of the conversion of the Bulgarians facilitated the conversion of the East Slavs. A major event was the development of the Cyrillic script in Bulgaria at the Preslav Literary School in the 9th century. The Cyrillic script and the liturgy in Old Church Slavonic, also called Old Bulgarian, were declared official in Bulgaria in 893.

By the early 12th century, individual Slavic languages started to emerge, and the liturgical language was modified in pronunciation, grammar, vocabulary, and orthography according to the local vernacular usage. These modified varieties or recensions (e.g. Serbian Church Slavonic, Russian Church Slavonic, Ukrainian Church Slavonic in Early Cyrillic script, Croatian Church Slavonic in Croatian angular Glagolitic and later in Latin script, Czech Church Slavonic, Slovak Church Slavonic in Latin script, Bulgarian Church Slavonic in Early Cyrillic and Glagolitic scripts, etc.) eventually stabilized and their regularized forms were used by the scribes to produce new translations of liturgical material from Koine Greek, or Latin in the case of Croatian Church Slavonic.

Attestation of Church Slavonic traditions appear in Early Cyrillic and Glagolitic scripts. Glagolitic has nowadays fallen out of use, though both scripts were used from the earliest attested period. The first Church Slavonic printed book was the Missale Romanum Glagolitice (1483) in angular Glagolitic, followed shortly by five Cyrillic liturgical books printed in Kraków in 1491.

== Recensions ==
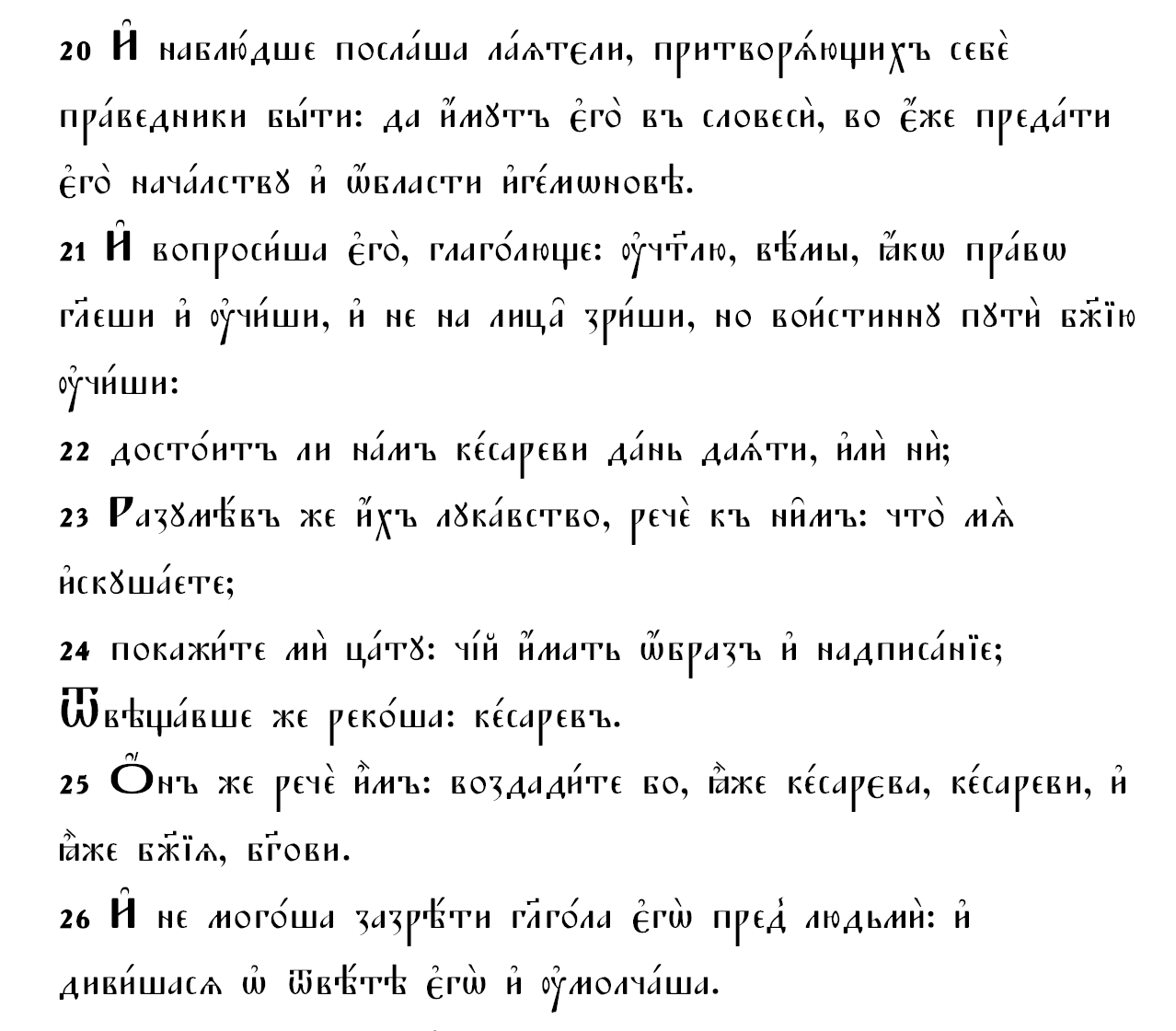
An example of Russian Church Slavonic computer typography

The Church Slavonic language is actually a set of at least four different dialects (recensions or redactions; Russian: извод, izvod), with essential distinctions between them in dictionary, spelling (even in writing systems), phonetics, and other aspects. The most widespread recension, Russian, has several local sub-dialects in turn, with slightly different pronunciations.

These various Church Slavonic recensions were used as a liturgical and literary language in all Slavic Orthodox countries north of the Mediterranean region during the Middle Ages, even in places where the local population was not Slavic (especially in Romania). In recent centuries, however, Church Slavonic was fully replaced by local languages in the non-Slavic countries. Even in some of the Slavic Orthodox countries, the modern national language is now used for liturgical purposes to a greater or lesser extent.

The Russian Orthodox Church, which contains around half of all Orthodox believers, still holds its liturgies almost entirely in Church Slavonic. However, there exist parishes which use other languages (where the main problem has been a lack of good translations). Examples include:

- According to the decision of the All-Russian Church Council of 1917–1918, service in Russian or Ukrainian can be permitted in individual parishes when approved by church authorities.
- Parishes serving ethnic minorities in Russia use (entirely or in part) the languages of those populations: Chuvash, Mordvinic, Mari, Tatar (for Keräşens), Sakha (Yakut), etc.
- Autonomous parts of the Russian Orthodox Church prepare and partly use translations to the languages of the local population, as Ukrainian, Belarusian, Romanian (in Moldova), Japanese, and Chinese.
- Parishes in the diaspora, including ones of the Russian Orthodox Church Outside Russia, often use local languages: English, French, Spanish, German, Dutch, Portuguese, etc.

What follows is a list of modern recensions or dialects of Church Slavonic. For a list and descriptions of extinct recensions, see the article on the Old Church Slavonic language.

=== Old Moscow recension ===
The Old Moscow recension is in use among Old Believers and Co-Believers. The same traditional Cyrillic alphabet as in Russian Synodal recension; however, there are differences in spelling because the Old Moscow recension reproduces an older state of orthography and grammar in general (before the 1650s). The most easily observable peculiarities of books in this recension are:

- using of digraph ⟨оу⟩ not only in the initial position,
- hyphenation with no hyphenation sign.

=== Russian (Synodal) recension ===
The Russian recension of New Church Slavonic is the language of books since the second half of the 17th century. It generally uses traditional Cyrillic script (poluustav); however, certain texts (mostly prayers) are printed in modern alphabets with the spelling adapted to rules of local languages (for example, in Russian/Ukrainian/Bulgarian/Serbian Cyrillic or in Hungarian/Slovak/Polish Latin).

Before the eighteenth century, Church Slavonic was in wide use as a general literary language in Russia. Although it was never spoken per se outside church services, members of the priesthood, poets, and the educated tended to slip its expressions into their speech. During the seventeenth and eighteenth centuries, it was gradually replaced by the Russian language in secular literature and was retained for use only in church. Although as late as the 1760s, Lomonosov argued that Church Slavonic was the so-called "high style" of Russian, during the nineteenth century within Russia, this point of view declined. Elements of Church Slavonic style may have survived longest in speech among the Old Believers after the late-seventeenth century schism in the Russian Orthodox Church.

Russian has borrowed many words from Church Slavonic. While both Russian and Church Slavonic are Slavic languages, some early Slavic sound combinations evolved differently in each branch. As a result, the borrowings into Russian are similar to native Russian words, but with South Slavic variances, e.g. (the first word in each pair is Russian, the second Church Slavonic): золото / злато (zoloto / zlato), город / град (gorod / grad), горячий / горящий (goryačiy / goryaščiy), рожать / рождать (rožat’ / roždat’). Since the Russian Romantic era and the corpus of work of the great Russian authors (from Gogol to Chekhov, Tolstoy, and Dostoevsky), the relationship between words in these pairs has become traditional. Where the abstract meaning has not commandeered the Church Slavonic word completely, the two words are often synonyms related to one another, much as Latin and native English words were related in the nineteenth century: one is archaic and characteristic of written high style, while the other is found in common speech.

In Russia, Church Slavonic is pronounced in the same way as Russian, with some exceptions:

- Church Slavonic features okanye and yekanye, i.e., the absence of vowel reduction in unstressed syllables. That is, о and е in unstressed positions are always read as [o] and [jɛ]~[ʲɛ] respectively (like in northern Russian dialects), whereas in standard Russian pronunciation they have different allophones when unstressed.
- There should be no de-voicing of final consonants, although in practice there often is.
- The letter е [je] is never read as ё [jo]~[ʲo] (the letter ё does not exist in Church Slavonic writing at all). This is also reflected in borrowings from Church Slavonic into Russian: in the following pairs the first word is Church Slavonic in origin, and the second is purely Russian: небо / нёбо (nebo / nëbo), надежда / надёжный (nadežda / nadëžnyj).
- The letter Γ can traditionally be read as voiced fricative velar sound [ɣ] (just as in Southern Russian dialects); however, occlusive [ɡ] (as in standard Russian pronunciation) is also possible and has been considered acceptable since the beginning of the 20th century. When unvoiced, it becomes [x]; this has influenced the Russian pronunciation of Бог (Bog) as Boh [box].
- The adjective endings -аго/-его/-ого/-яго are pronounced as written ([aɣo/ago], [ʲeɣo/ʲego], [oɣo/ogo], [ʲaɣo/ʲago]), whereas Russian -его/-ого are pronounced with [v] instead of [ɣ/g] (and with the reduction of unstressed vowels).

=== Ukrainian and Rusyn recension ===
A main difference between Russian and Ukrainian recension of Church Slavonic as well as the Russian "Civil Script" lies in the pronunciation of the letter yat (ѣ). The Russian pronunciation is the same as е [je]~[ʲe] whereas the Ukrainian is the same as і [i]. Greek Catholic variants of Church Slavonic books printed in variants of the Latin alphabet (a method used in Austro-Hungary and Czechoslovakia) just contain the letter "i" for yat. Other distinctions reflect differences between palatalization rules of Ukrainian and Russian (for example, ⟨ч⟩ is always "soft" (palatalized) in Russian pronunciation and "hard" in the Ukrainian one), different pronunciation of letters ⟨г⟩ and ⟨щ⟩, etc. Another major difference is the use of Ґ in the Rusyn variant. Г is pronounced as h and Ґ is pronounced as G. For example, Blagosloveno is Blahosloveno in Rusyn variants.

Typographically, Serbian and Ukrainian editions (when printed in traditional Cyrillic) are almost identical to the Russian ones. Certain visible distinctions may include:

- less frequent use of abbreviations in "nomina sacra";
- treating digraph ⟨оу⟩ as a single character rather than two letters (for example, in letter-spacing or in combination with diacritical marks: in Russian editions, they are placed above ⟨у⟩, not between ⟨о⟩ and ⟨у⟩; also, when the first letter of a word is printed in different color, it is applied to ⟨о⟩ in Russian editions and to the entire ⟨оу⟩ in Serbian and Ukrainian).

Lord's Prayer comparison
English (NIV)	Church Slavonic	Moscow recension (Note: As of the early 21st century, the Russian Orthodox Church still employs the New Moscow Recension of Church Slavonic. The comparison with the modern Russian vernacular is therefore based on the 2001 Good News translation by the Bible Society in Russia.) (compare: modern Russian)	Kyiv recension (compare: modern Ukrainian)
Our Father in heaven,	Ѿче нашъ иже еси на небесѣхъ,	Отче наш, Иже еси на небесех! (Отец наш на Небесах,)	Отче наш, іже єси на небесіх, (Отче наш, що єси на небесах!)
hallowed be your name,	да свѧтитсѧ имѧ Твое,	Да святится имя Твое, (Пусть прославится Твоё имя,)	да святится ім'я Твоє; (Нехай святиться ім'я Твоє,)
your kingdom come,	да прїидетъ царствїе Твое,	да приидет Царствие Твое, (Пусть придёт Твоё царство,)	да приідет царствіє Твоє; (нехай прийде Царство Твоє,)
your will be done,	да будетъ волѧ Твоѧ,	да будет воля Твоя, (пусть исполнится [воля Твоя],)	да будет воля Твоя, (нехай буде воля Твоя,)
on earth as it is in heaven.	ѧко на небеси и на земли.	яко на небеси и на земли. (и на Земле[,] как на Небе.)	яко на небеси і на земли. (як на небі, так і на землі.)
Give us today our daily bread.	Хлѣбъ нашъ насущныий даждь намъ дне́сь	Хлеб наш насущный даждь нам днесь; (Дай нам сегодня насущный наш хлеб.)	Хліб наш насущний даждь нам днесь; (Хліб наш насущний дай нам сьогодні.)
And forgive us our debts,	и остави намъ долъгы наша,	и остави нам долги наша, (И прости нам наши долги,)	і остави нам долги наша, (І прости нам провини наші,)
as we also have forgiven our debtors.	ѧко и мы оставлѧемъ долъжникомъ нашимъ	якоже и мы оставляем должником нашим; (как и мы прощаем тех, кто нам должен.)	якоже і ми оставляєм должником нашим, (як і ми прощаємо винуватцям нашим.)
And lead us not into temptation,	и не въведи насъ в напасть	и не введи нас во искушение, (Не подвергай нас испытанию,)	і не введи нас во іскушеніє, (І не введи нас у спокусу,)
but deliver us from the evil one.	но избави насъ ѿ лукаваго.	но избави нас от лукаваго. (но защити нас от Злодея.)	но ізбави нас от лукаваго. (але визволи нас від лукавого.)

=== Serbian recension ===
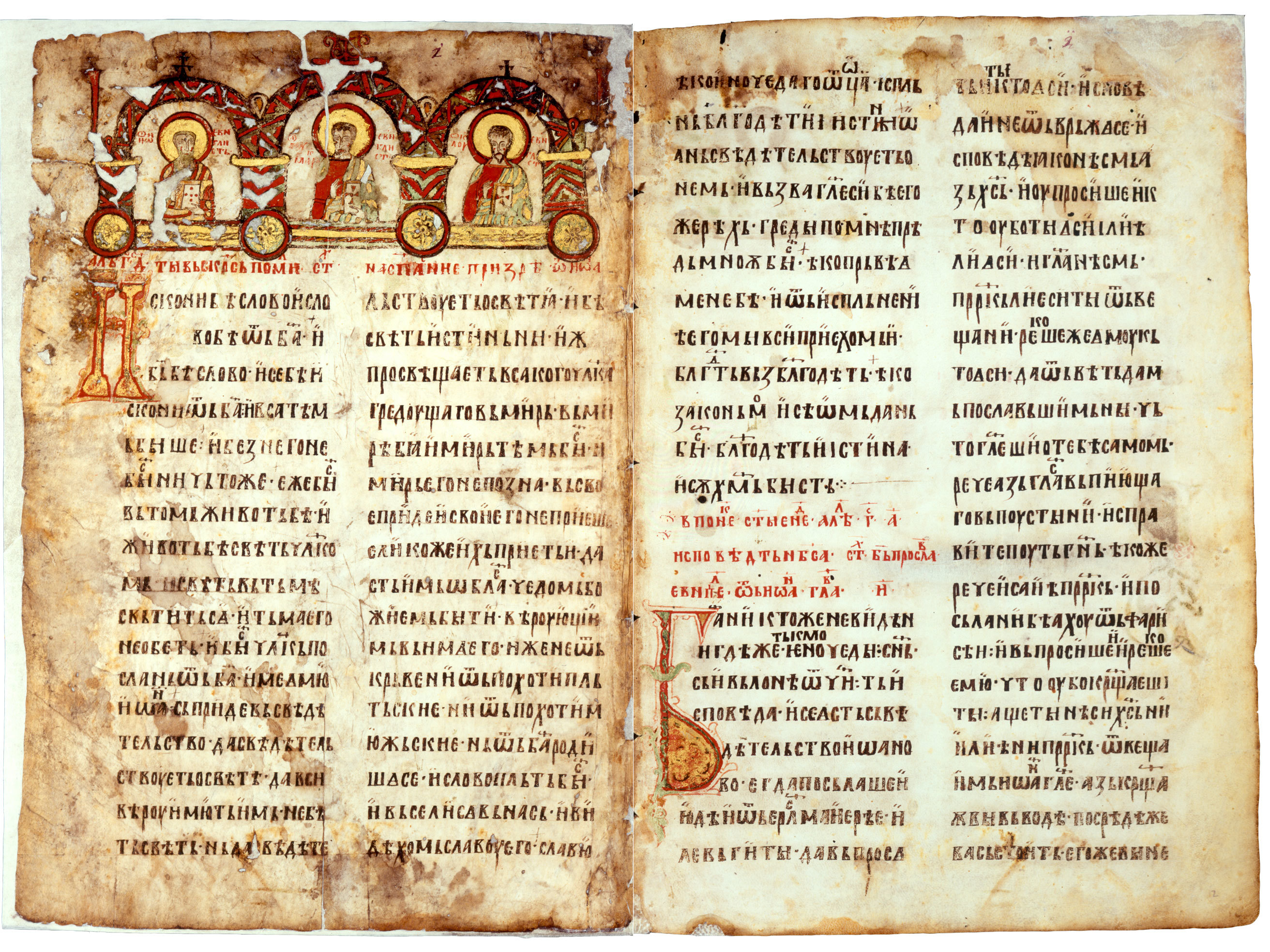
The Miroslav's Gospel from the late 12th century, written in Serbian recension

Serbian recension of the Church Slavic language emerged in medieval Serbia, and was attested since the 11th-12th century. It was marked by mutual influences between the Old Church Slavic standard and the common vernacular (Old Serbian) language. The variant differences in Serbian recension were limited to the lack of certain sounds in Serbian phonetics (there are no sounds corresponding to letters ы and щ, and in certain cases the palatalization is impossible to observe, e.g. ть is pronounced as т etc.). The medieval Serbian recension of Church Slavonic was the language of Medieval Serbian literature and early modern Serbian printing. It was used up tho the 18th century, when it was gradually replaced by the Russian (Synodal) recension. Serbian recension influenced the later literary Slavonic-Serbian language.

Nowadays in Serbia, Church Slavonic is generally pronounced according to the Russian model.

=== Croatian recension ===
This is in limited use among Croatian Catholics. Texts are printed in the Croatian Latin alphabet (with the addition of letter ⟨ě⟩ for yat) or in Glagolitic script. Sample editions include:

- Missale Romanum Glagolitice
- Josef Vajs, Abecedarivm Palaeoslovenicvm in usvm glagolitarvm. Veglae, [Krk], 1917 (2nd ed.). XXXVI+76 p. (collection of liturgical texts in Glagolitic script, with a brief Church Slavonic grammar written in Latin language and Slavonic-Latin dictionary)
- Rimski misal slavĕnskim jezikom: Čin misi s izbranimi misami..., Zagreb: Kršćanska sadašnjost, 1980 (The ISBN specified even at the publisher 978-953-151-721-5 is bad, causing a checksum error) (in Croatian Latin script)

=== Czech recension ===
Church Slavonic is in very limited use among Czech Catholics. The recension was developed by Vojtěch Tkadlčík in his editions of the Roman missal:

- Rimskyj misal slověnskym jazykem izvoljenijem Apostolskym za Arcibiskupiju Olomuckuju iskusa dělja izdan. Olomouc 1972.
- Rimskyj misal povelěnijem svjataho vselenskaho senma Vatikanskaho druhaho obnovljen... Olomouc 1992.

== Grammar and style ==
Although the various recensions of Church Slavonic differ in some points, they share the tendency of approximating the original Old Church Slavonic to the local Slavic vernacular. Inflection tends to follow the ancient patterns with few simplifications. All original six verbal tenses, seven nominal cases, and three numbers are intact in most frequently used traditional texts (but in the newly composed texts, authors avoid most archaic constructions and prefer variants that are closer to modern Russian syntax and are better understood by the Slavic-speaking people).

In Russian recension, the fall of the yers is fully reflected, more or less to the Russian pattern, although the terminal ъ continues to be written. The yuses are often replaced or altered in usage to the sixteenth- or seventeenth-century Russian pattern. The yat continues to be applied with greater attention to the ancient etymology than it was in nineteenth-century Russian. The letters ksi, psi, omega, ot, and izhitsa are kept, as are the letter-based denotation of numerical values, the use of stress accents, and the abbreviations or titla for nomina sacra.

The vocabulary and syntax, whether in scripture, liturgy, or church missives, are generally somewhat modernised in an attempt to increase comprehension. In particular, some of the ancient pronouns have been eliminated from the scripture (such as етеръ /jeter/ "a certain (person, etc.)" → нѣкій in the Russian recension). Many, but not all, occurrences of the imperfect tense have been replaced with the perfect.

Miscellaneous other modernisations of classical formulae have taken place from time to time. For example, the opening of the Gospel of John, by tradition the first words written down by Saints Cyril and Methodius, (искони бѣаше слово) "In the beginning was the Word", were set as "искони бѣ слово" in the Ostrog Bible of Ivan Fedorov (1580/1581) and as въ началѣ бѣ слово in the Elizabethan Bible of 1751, still in use in the Russian Orthodox Church.

== See also ==
- Outline of Slavic history and culture
- List of Slavic studies journals
- List of Glagolitic books
- List of Glagolitic manuscripts
- Old Church Slavonic
- Chinese characters for transcribing Slavonic
- Slavic Orthodox churches

== Sources ==
- Albijanić, Aleksandar (1978). "Serbian Church Slavic Elements in 18th-Early 19th Century Vojvodina Sources". Die Welt der Slaven. 23 (2): 268–283.
- Albijanić, Aleksandar (1985). "The Demise of Serbian Church Slavic and the advent of the Slaveno-Serbski Literary Dialect". The Formation of the Slavonic literary Languages. Columbus, Ohio: Slavica Publishers. pp. 115–123.
- Albin, Alexander (1970). "The Creation of the Slaveno-Serbski Literary Language". The Slavonic and East European Review. 48 (113): 483–491.
- Cooper, Henry R. (2003). Slavic Scriptures: The Formation of the Church Slavonic Version of the Holy Bible. Madison: Fairleigh Dickinson Univ Press.
- Curta, Florin (2006). Southeastern Europe in the Middle Ages, 500–1250. Cambridge: Cambridge University Press.
- Dvornik, Francis (1956). The Slavs: Their Early History and Civilization. Boston: American Academy of Arts and Sciences.
- Grickat-Radulović, Irena (1993). "Serbian Medieval Literary Language". Serbs in European Civilization. Belgrade: Nova, Serbian Academy of Sciences and Arts, Institute for Balkan Studies. pp. 146–150.
- Grković-Major, Jasmina (2021). "Serbian Church Slavonic influence on the Old Serbian language". Old Church Slavonic Heritage in Slavonic and Other Languages. Praha: Nakladatelství Lidové noviny. pp. 271–279.
- Ivić, Pavle (1995). "Standard Language as an Instrument of Culture and the Product of National History". The History of Serbian Culture. Edgware: Porthill Publishers. pp. 41–51.
