= Interpretation of the Passion of our Lord Jesus Christ =

1493 narrative work by Simon Greblo

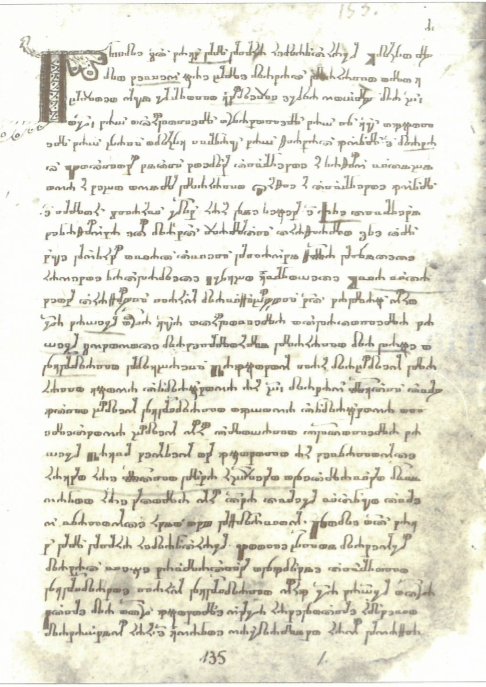
- First page from the Interpretation
- Created: 1493
- Location: National and University Library, Zagreb
- Author(s): Simon Greblo
- Purpose: Glagolitic missal

The Interpretation of the Passion of our Lord Jesus Christ (Croatian: Tlmačenie od muki Gospoda našego Isuhrsta) is a 15th-century work of narrative prose written in Glagolitic alphabet by the Glacolitic priest (at the time deacon) Simon Greblo.

== History ==
This liturgical book was written in Roč by the resident calligrapher and glagolitic scribe Simon Greblo in 1493. It is a work of narrative prose, and it deals with the "pain of Jesus and Mary on Good Friday." The document was written in Roč, which at the time was one of the centers of Croatian culture. It is the first of the only three known works by Greblo that have survived to this day; the others being the Quadriga by spiritual law (Kvadriga duhovnim zakonom), 1493; and the Quadragesimale (Kvarezimal), 1498. Greblo completed this work when he was still a deacon (žakan oko lit). He completed the manuscript on March 5, 1493. In the same year, Greblo became a priest

== Description ==
This book is one of the best preserved Glagolitic manuscripts and is of great significance to the history of Croatian literature. Greblo's Interpretation of the Passion of our Lord Jesus Christ was bound in one volume in 1516. It was inherited by Jerolim Greblo and sold in 1547 to the priest Matej Mejak. It was thought that Simon Greblo had died shortly before Jerolim Greblo's inheritance. However, it has been established that he probably died shortly after the last entry in the Account Book of the Brotherhood of St. Bartholomew in 1529. The book traveled through Istria and Krk, and in 1962 it was permanently deposited in the vault of the National and University Library in Zagreb.

The language of Greblo's texts is Chakavian, with a consistently carried out Liburnian Ekavization and rare Paleo-Slavicisms. Greblo's calligraphy in this manuscript, modest and refined, is considered one of the most beautiful in Croatian Glagolitic history. However, apart from the text's "high artistic value, both in the literary sense and in the visual sense, given the fact that Greblo was a top calligrapher of cursive Glagolitic, the originality of its linguistic expression is regularly emphasized."

== See also ==
- Glagolitic alphabet
- List of Glagolitic manuscripts (1400–1499)
- Lists of Glagolitic manuscripts
- Missale Romanum Glagolitice

== Sources ==
- J. Gršković, Istrian Old Croatian Passion of the Cross from the XV. century, Horizon 69, 1928, 97;
- V. Štefanić, Glagolitic Manuscripts of the Island of Krk, Zagreb 1960;
- S. Graciotti, L'originale italiano delle glagolitiche Kvadrige duhovne di Veglia e di Vienna, Ricerche slavistiche, Roma 1963, 11;
- J. Bratulić, O hrvatskom književniku Šimunu Greblu, Istarski mozaik, 1969, 7 (same in Istarske književne teme, Pula 1987);
- A. Zbogija Kiš, Šimun Greblo and His Interpretation of the Passion of Christ (1493), with the edition of the text, Pazin 2001;
- D. Vlahov, Tko je bilo ročki plovan, pop glagoljaš preminuo 1551. godine ?, Nova Istra, 2003, 3–4.
