= Missale Romanum Glagolitice =

First printed Croatian book from 1483

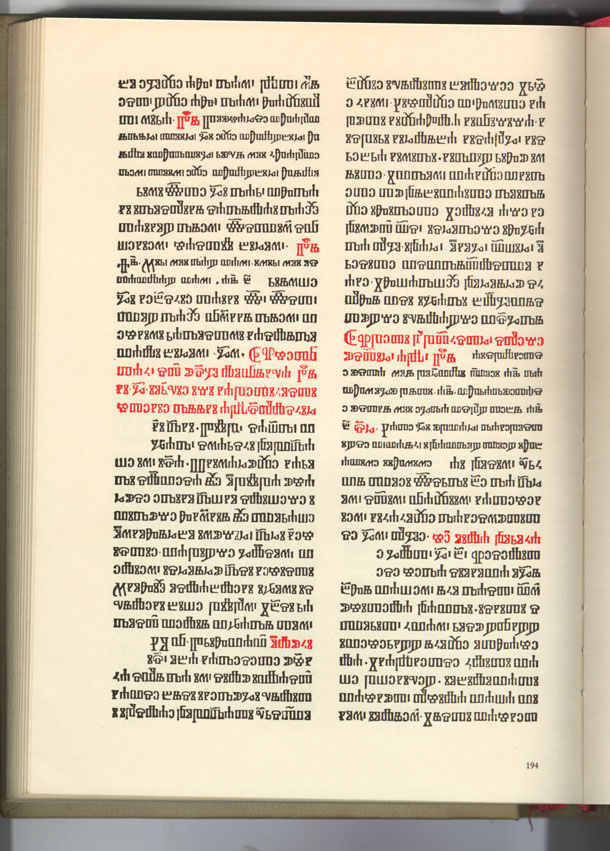
A modern copy of a page from the Missale Romanum Glagolitice (note the page number at bottom right)

Missale Romanum Glagolitice (Croatian: Misal po zakonu rimskoga dvora, Ⱞⰹⱄⰰⰾⱏ ⱂⱁ ⰸⰰⰽⱁⱀⱆ ⱃⰹⰿⱄⰽⱁⰳⰰ ⰴⰲⱁⱃⰰ) is a Croatian missal and incunabulum printed in 1483. It is written in Glagolitic script and is the first printed Croatian book. It is the first missal in Europe not published in Latin script. Its editio princeps, unique in the achieved typographic artistry, was published 28 years after the Gutenberg Bible's 42-lines, which bore witness of high cultural influence of Croatian Glagolites at the time.

== Characteristics ==
It is written in the Croatian recension of Church Slavonic and printed in Croatian angular Glagolitic. It has 440 pp, in format 19x26 cm. Its principal model in terms of subject and equivalent Glagolitic letters is thought to be the famous codex Misal kneza Novaka ("Prince Novak's Missal"), from 1368. The original manuscript of Novak's missal was then located in the village of Nugla near Roč. The text, however, was "modernized" with numerous words from then contemporary language. It was edited by the priests of Roč, notably Žakan Juri. The original manuscript of Novak's missal bears a historically important note by Simon Greblo. The manuscript used for the print of the Missale Romanum Glagolitice was probably carried to print by the deacon Žakan Juri.

Paleographic and linguistic analysis of the text revealed that the first printed Croatian books was edited by the Croats from Istria. The Missal rituals strictly follow the Latin Editio princeps (Milan, 1474) with slight differences in the order of some rituals.

Date of the printing (22 February 1483) is shown in the colophon, but the place of printing of still remains to be identified. According to some researchers, it was printed in Venice, but recent research assume suggests that it might have been printed in Kosinj in the Lika region. There is a historically important note on the manuscript used as a template for the Missale Romanum Glagolitice's print, written by Žakan Juri, who likely carried the book to print, in which he expresses his satisfaction at the forthcoming printing of the first Croatian book. In the note, he mentions that he is in Izola, and it is assumed that he was en route to the printing press.

HR-ZaKSI OR 2, a fragment of page 6

Eleven incomplete copies and six fragments have been preserved, five of which are held in Zagreb: two in the National and University Library, and two in the library of the Croatian Academy of Sciences and Arts. The Franciscan monastery in Zagreb and the Dominican monastery on the island of Brač have one copy each. The other five copies are kept in the Library of Congress in Washington, in the Russian National Library in St. Petersburg, in the Austrian National Library in Vienna and in the Vatican Library (two copies).

== Miscellaneous ==
President of Croatia Zoran Milanović gifted pope Leo XIV in his official visit on 31 October 2025 with the reprint of the Missale.

== See also ==
- List of Glagolitic books
- Spovid općena
