= Bartholomew of San Concordio =

Italian jurist

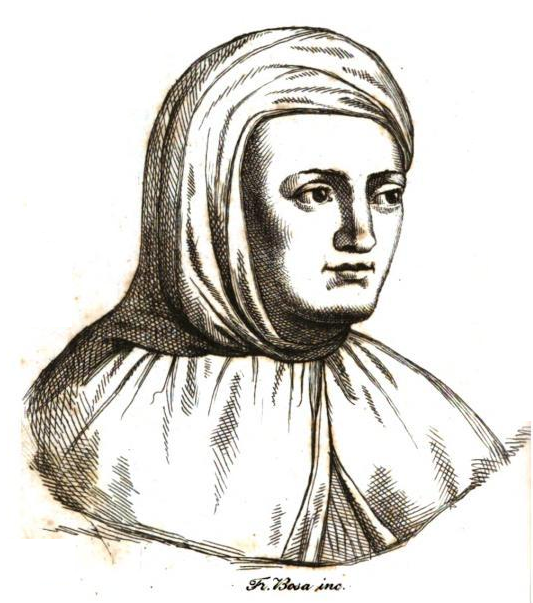
Bartholomew of San Concordio

Bartholomew of San Concordio (c. 1260 at San Concordio, near Pisa – 11 June 1347 at Pisa) was an Italian Dominican canonist and man of letters. He was the author of the Summa de casibus conscientiae (1338) and of the Ammaestramenti degli antichi.

== Life ==
Bartholomew entered the Dominican Order in 1277, studied at Pisa, Bologna, and Paris, and taught at Lucca, Florence, and Pisa. He was appointed lector at the studium particularis theologiae at Santa Maria sopra Minerva in 1299, which has sprung from the studium provinciale at Santa Sabina in 1288, and which was the forerunner to the College of Saint Thomas at the Minerva convent, and the Pontifical University of Saint Thomas Aquinas, Angelicum.

A preacher of renown, Bartolomeo was as learned as he was devout, as skilled in Latin and Tuscan poetry as he was versed in canon and civil law. He is variously called "Pisana", "Pisanella", "Bartholomaea", and "Magistruccia".

== Works ==
His fame rests chiefly on his alphabetically arranged "Summa de Casibus Conscientiae". The basis of this work was a "Summa Confessorum" by John Rumsik, O. P., Lector of Freiburg (d. 1314). Bartholomew arranged Rumsik's topic in alphabetical order, and added material on canon law.

Bartholomew's treatise was clear and concise, and it conformed to the newer laws and canons of his time. Evidently a highly useful digest, it was very popular and much used during the fourteenth and fifteenth centuries, and was among the first books undertaken by some of the earliest printers of Germany, France, and Italy. Nicholas of Osimo, O.M., added a supplement in 1444, which also appeared in many editions. Others likewise incorporated the work in later handbooks, notably James of Ascoli, O. M., 1464, and Ange de Clavasio, O.M., in his "Summa Angelica".

Apart from several MSS. on moral and literary subjects, his works include "De documentis antiquorum", edited by Albertus Clarius, O. P. (Tarvisi, 1601) in 8 vo. The same treatise in the vernacular, "Ammaestramenti degli antichi" (Florence, 1662), came to be regarded as a Tuscan classic.
