= Glagolitic Alley =

Memorial honoring Croatian scribal tradition in Glagolitic script

Coordinates: 45.3916°N 14.0446°E

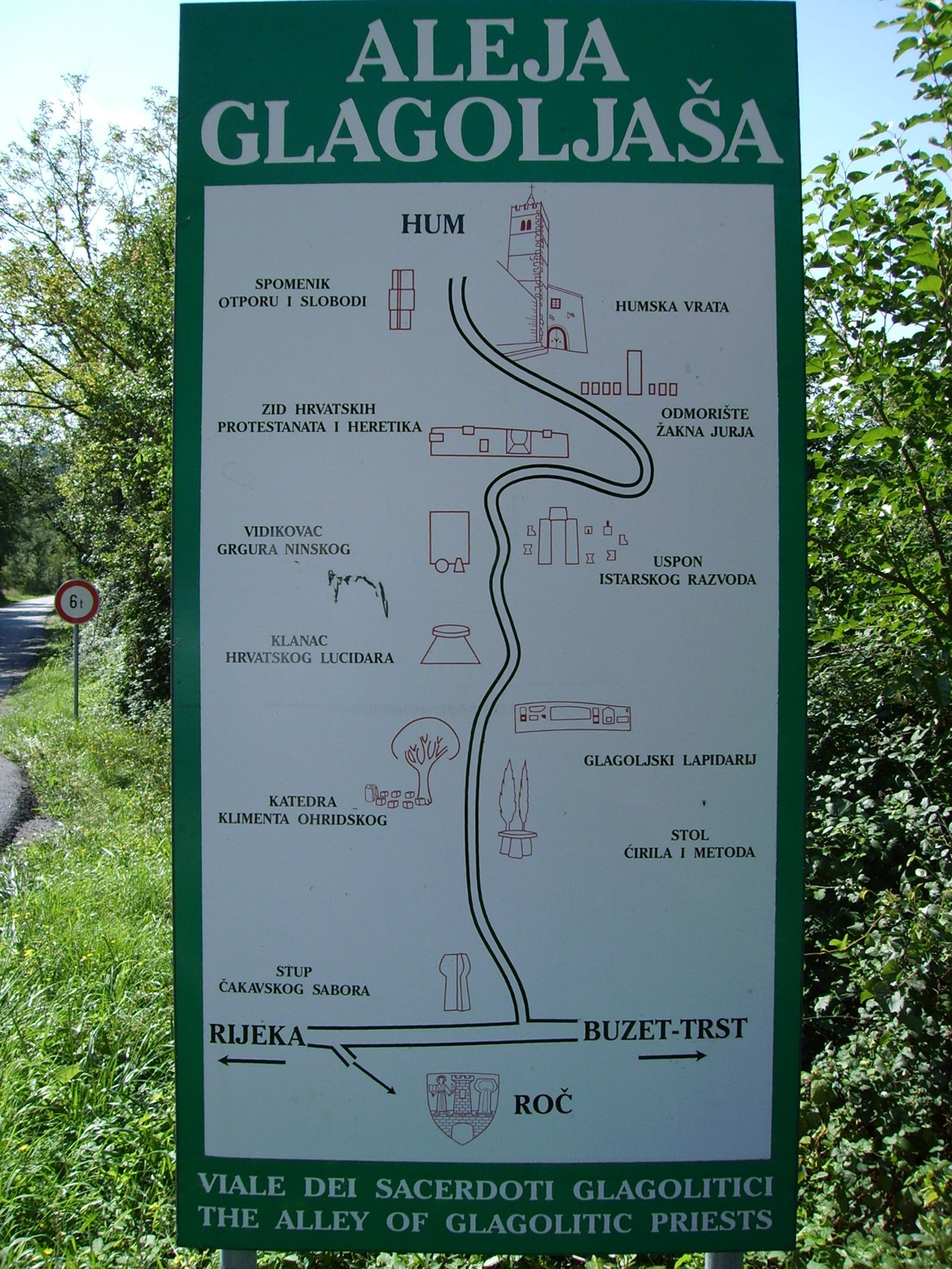
Board with a description of Glagolitic Alley

Glagolitic Alley (Croatian: Aleja glagoljaša) is a memorial composed of a string of eleven outdoor monuments dotting the road between the villages Roč and Hum in Croatia. Sculptures were erected between 1977 and 1985 to honor the historical Croatian scribal tradition in Glagolitic script. The road is seven kilometers (4.3 mi) long and located in the region of Istria.

== History ==
Idea for the memorial was conceived by a writer Zvane Črnja, while the individual monuments themselves were worked out by a sculptor Želimir Janeš and a literary historian Josip Bratulić. Alley shows the path of Istrian, Croatian and Slavic Glagolitic tradition, illustrating the centers of Croatian Glagolitic medieval literature in Istria, suggesting its Slavic roots and literacy and its continuity from the 11th century to the present day.

== Monuments ==
The memorial is composed of eleven individual monuments, ten of which are made of stone, and one (City Gate) made of copper. The monuments appear along the road as following:

1. Pillar of the Čakavian Parliament (1977) - in the form of Glagolitic letter S symbolizing logos, mind, reason
2. Table of Cyril and Methodius (1978) - a three-legged table before two cypresses which symbolize the two brothers
3. Assembly of Clement of Ohrid (1978) - Clement was the student of the Cyril and Methodios and the founder of the first Slavic literary school
4. Glagolitic Lapidarium (1984) - copies of the most important Glagolitic monuments from regions of the former Yugoslavia
5. Gorge of Croatian Lucidarius - symbolizing the Istrian Mount Olympus: Učka
6. Belvedere of Grgur Ninski - a stone book with Glagolitic, Cyrillic and Latin letters inscribed
7. The Rise of the Istrian Demarcation (1980), stone door in the form of Glagolitic letter L, through which a road runs and around which stones are scattered forming Glagolitic letters, spelling the words of Istrian Demarcation
8. Wall of Croatian Protestants and Heretics - a stone clepsydra with names of Croatian Protestants
9. Resting Place of Žakan Juraj - commemorating the first Croatian printed book in seven stone chairs forming the letters that spell the name of Žakan Juraj
10. Monument to Resistance and Freedom (1979) - three stone blocks representing the Antiquity, Middle Ages and Modern Period
11. City Gates - a copper door with bucrania, knocker and a calendar, showing the work in the field for each month of the year

== Gallery of the monuments ==
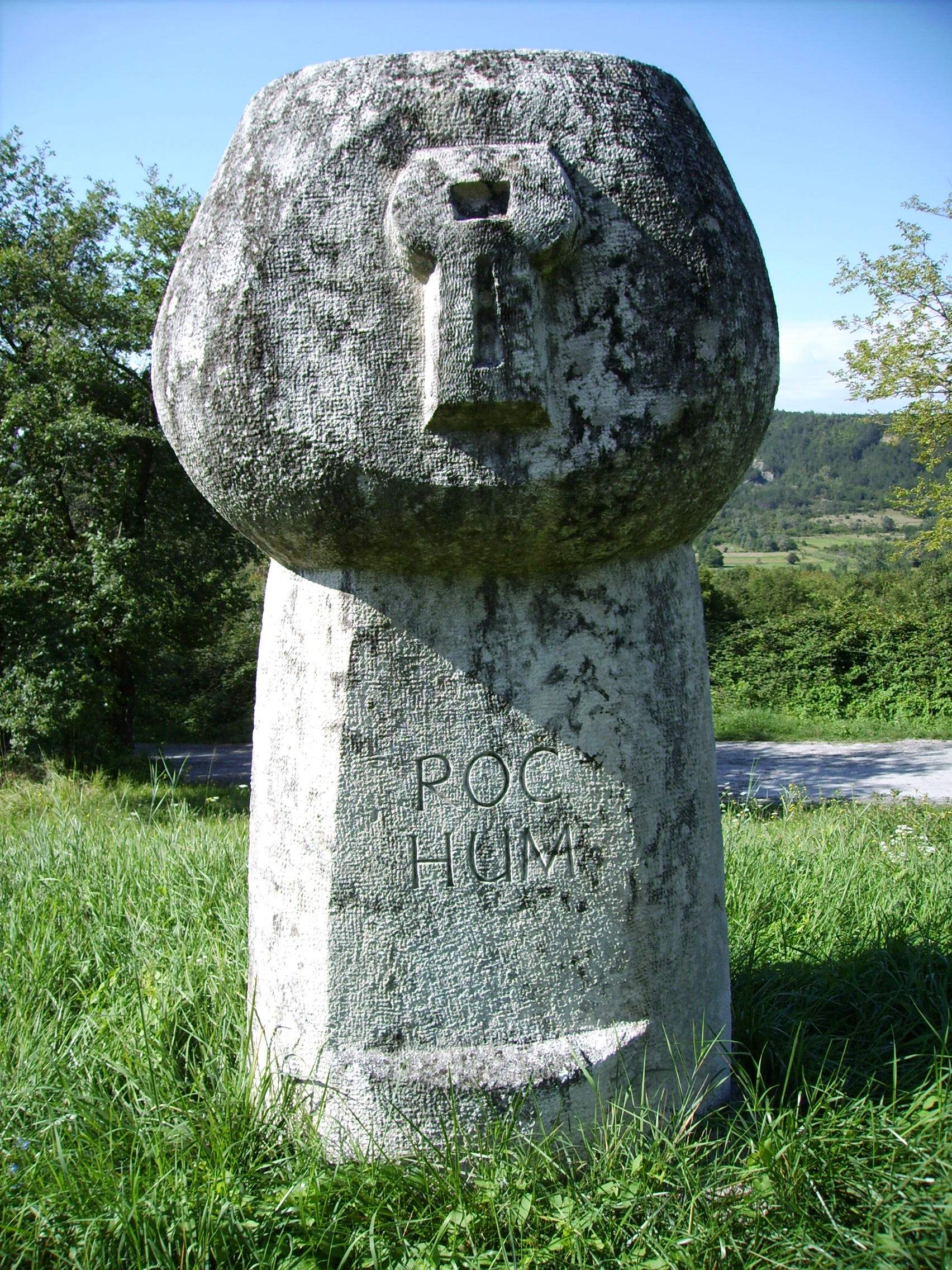
(1) Column of the Chakavian People's Assembly

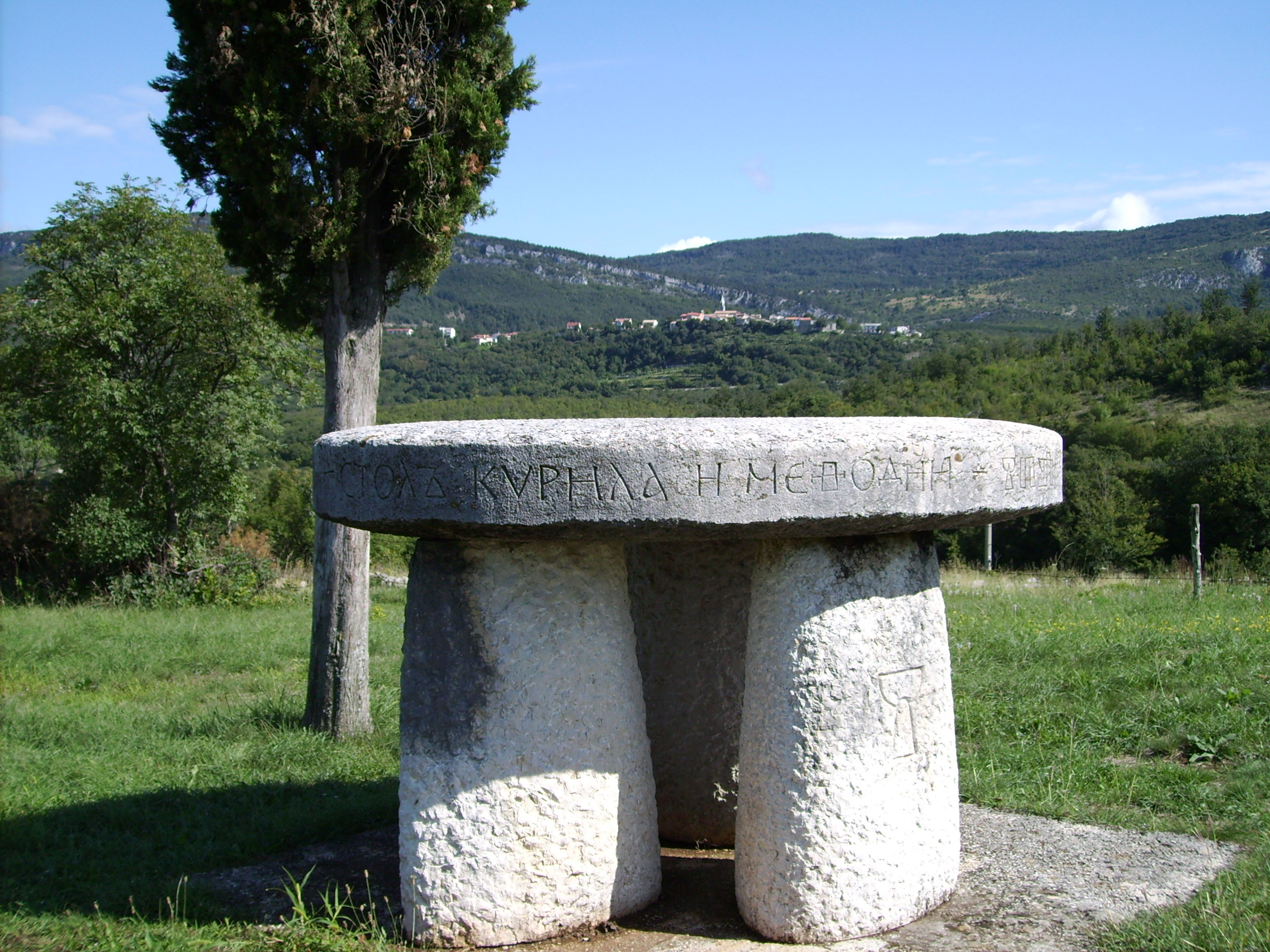
(2) Table of Cyril and Methodius

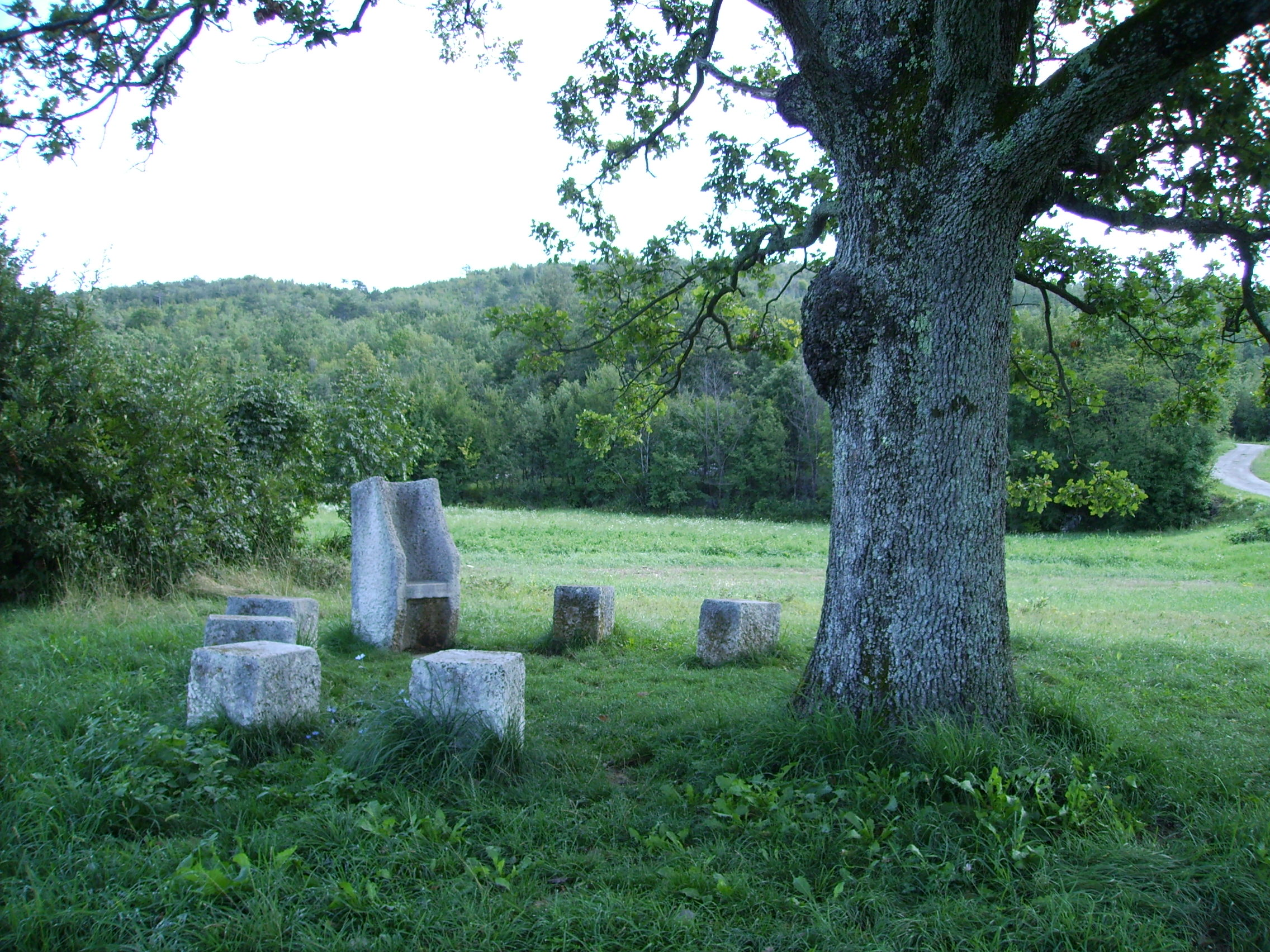
(3) Assembly of Clement of Ohrid

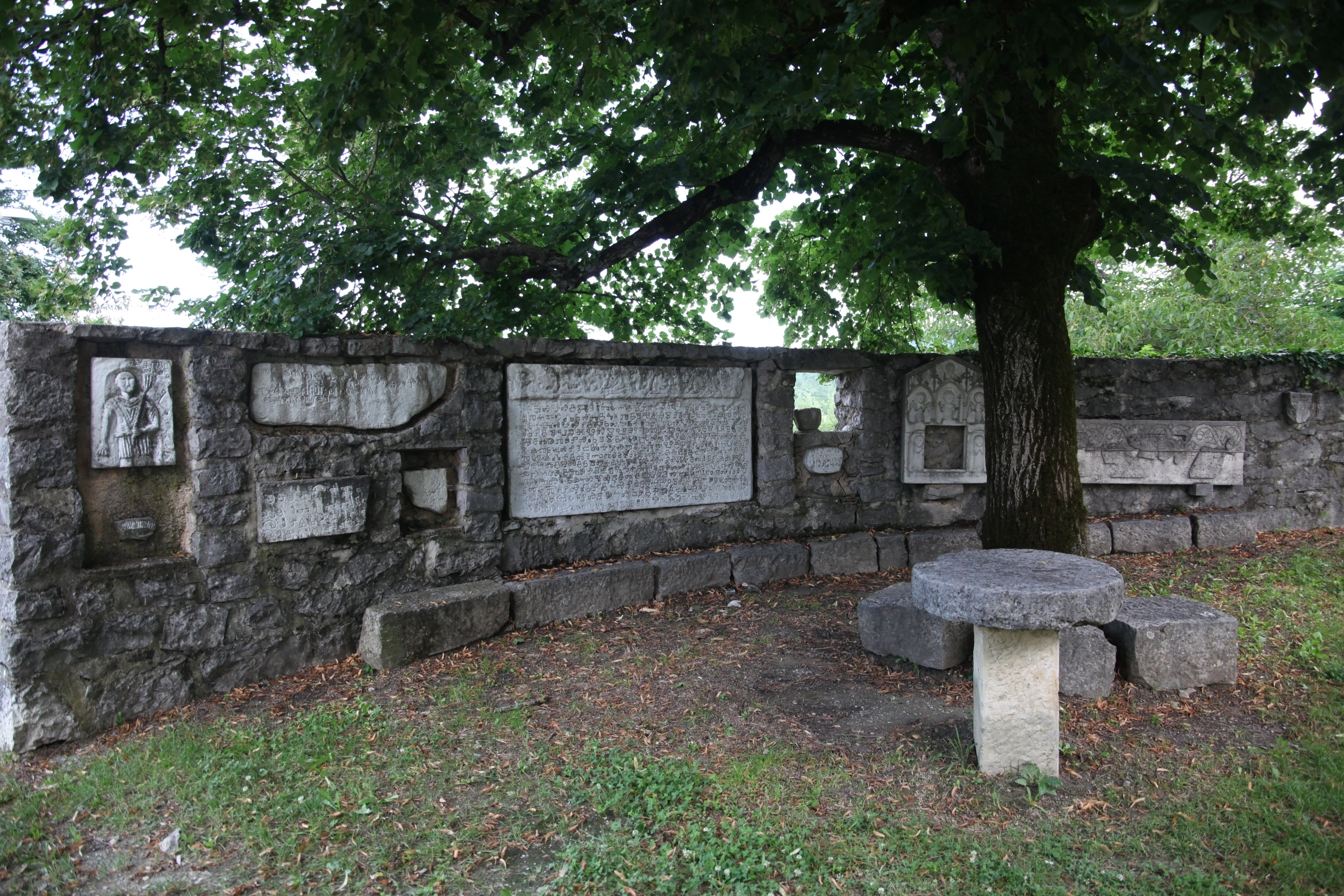
(4) Glagolitic Lapidarium

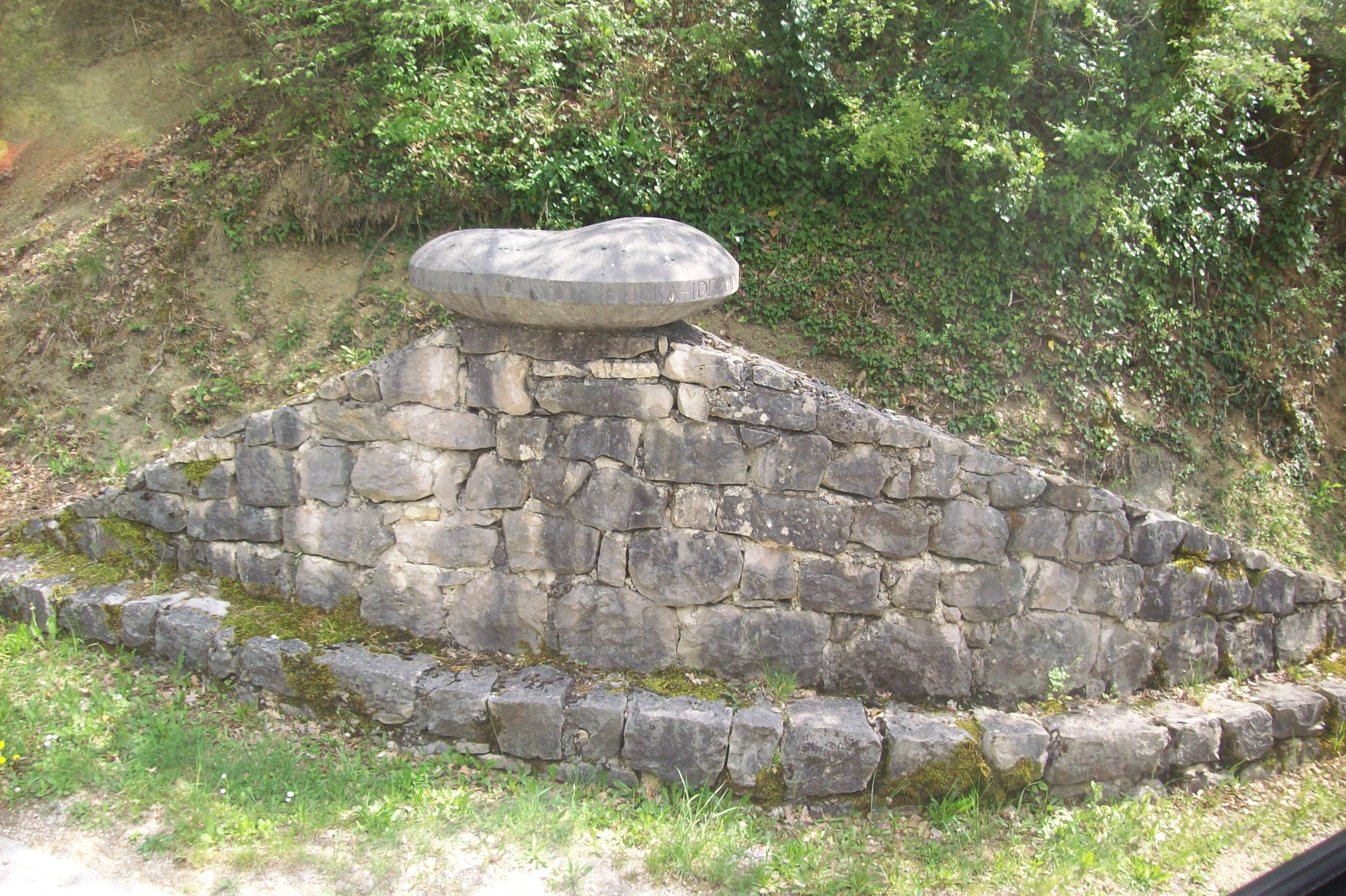
(5) Gorge of Croatian Lucidarius

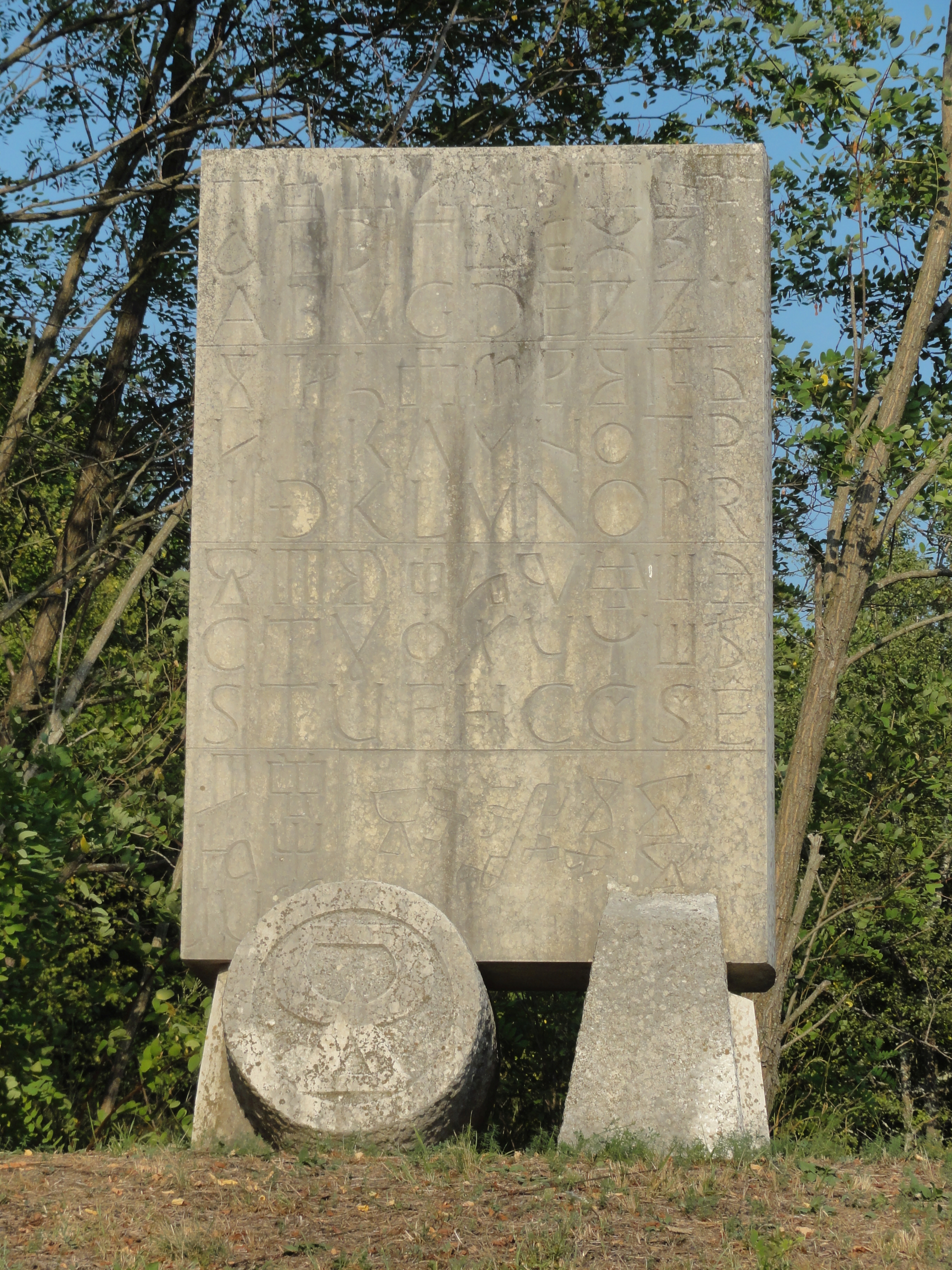
(6) Viewpoint of Gregory of Nin

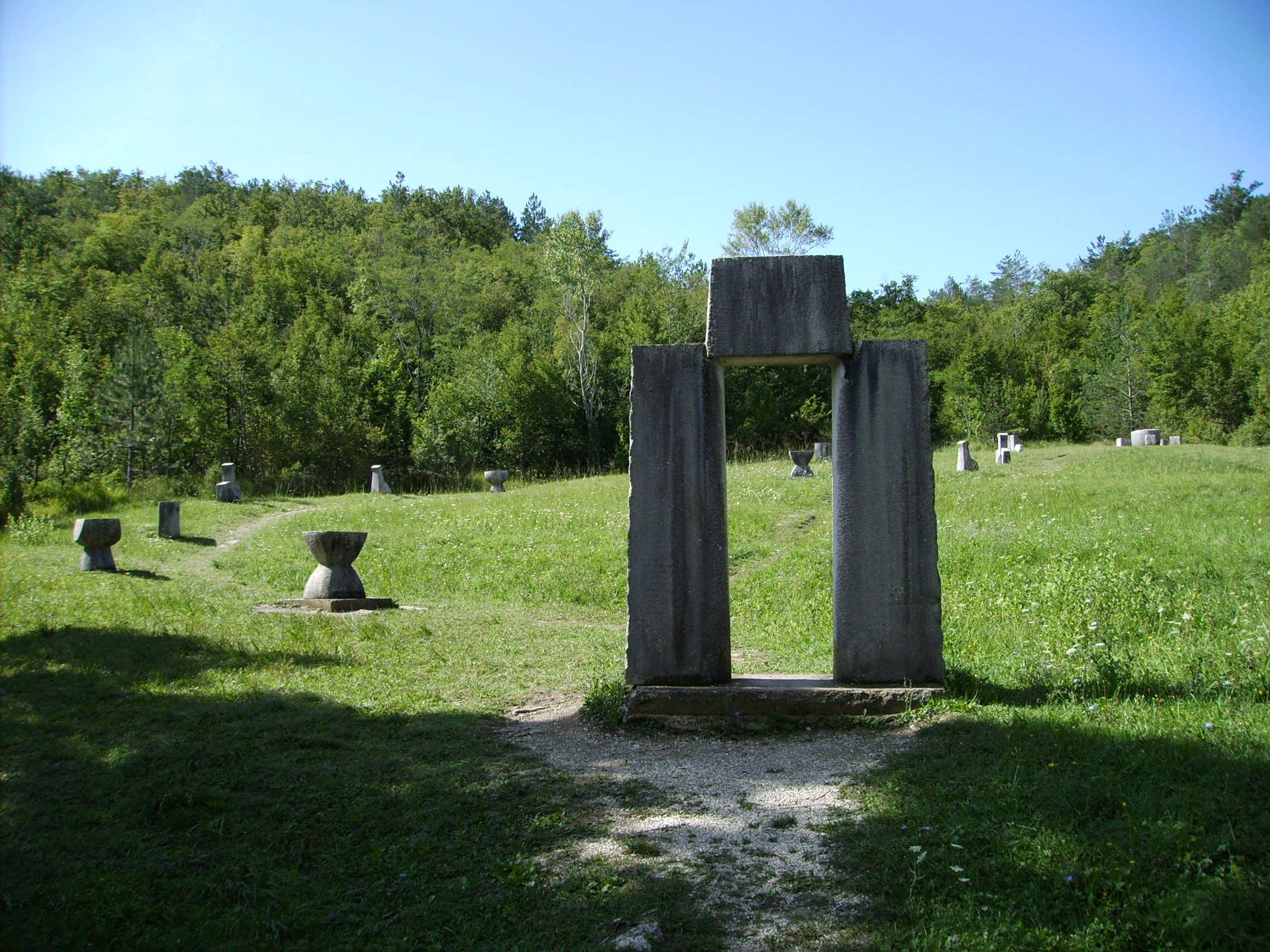
(7) Rise of the Istrian Code

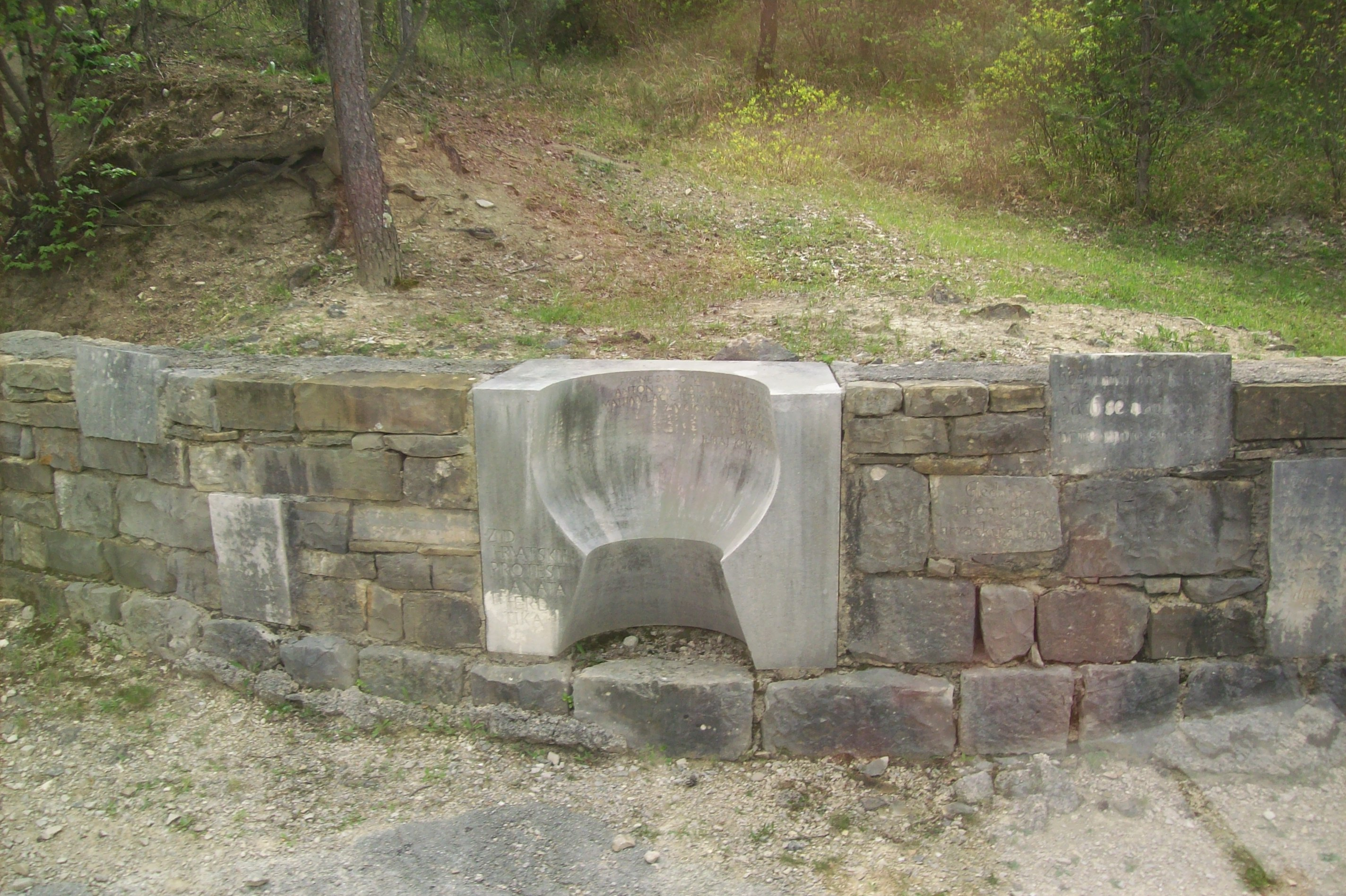
(8) Wall of Croatian Protestants and Heretics

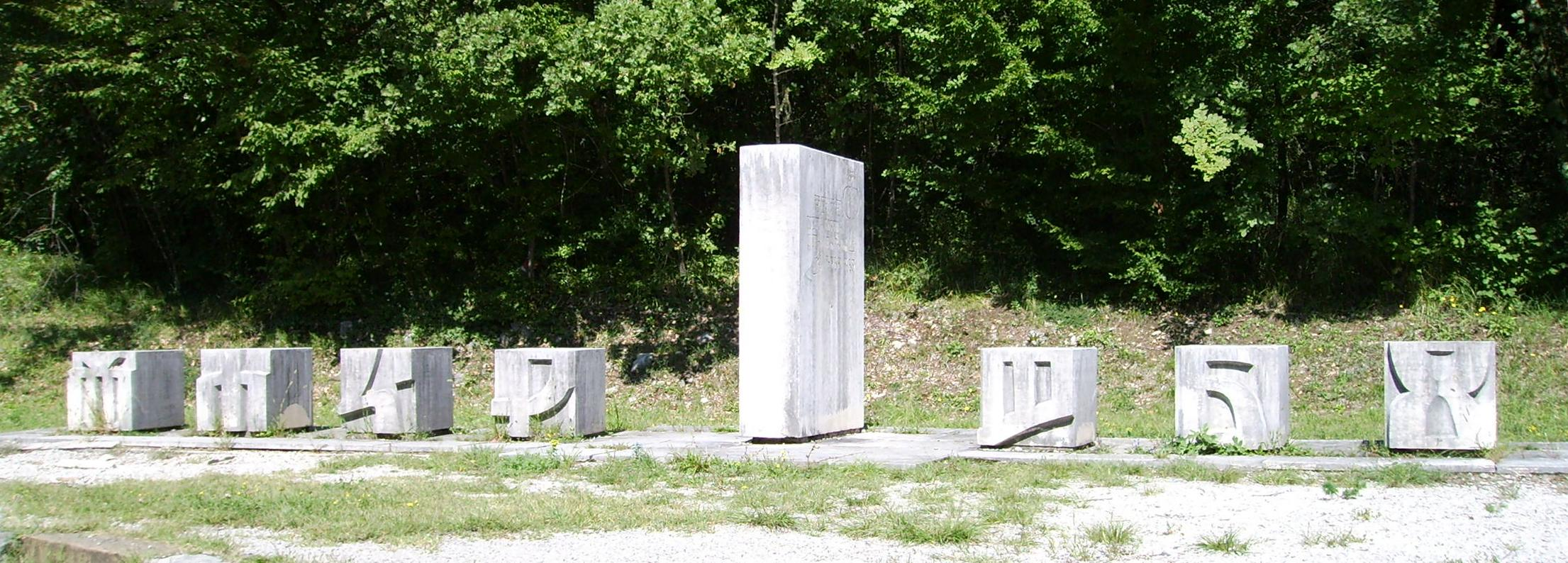
(9) Resting place of Žakan Juri

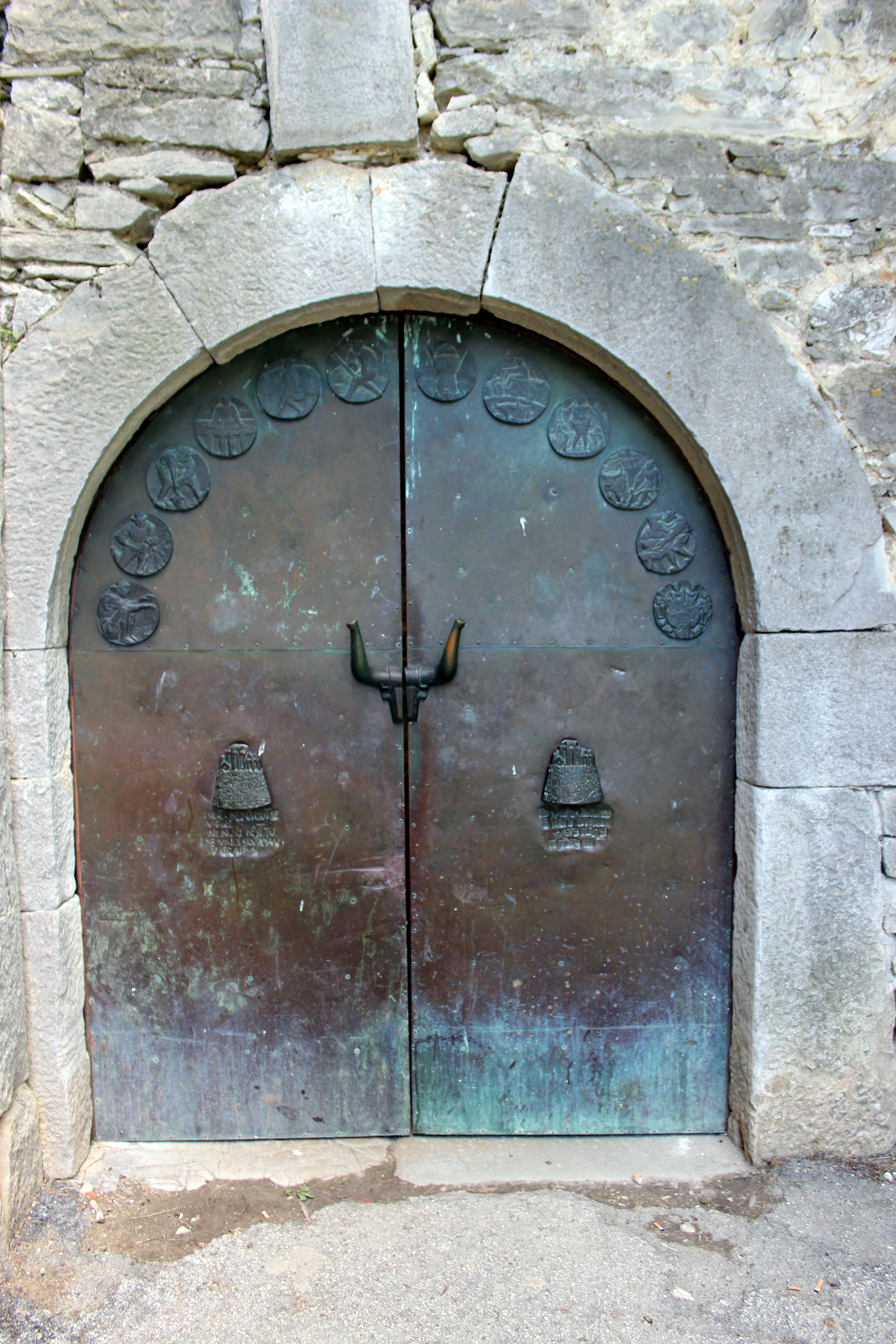
(11) Hum's Gates
