= Nicholas of Osimo =

Italian Franciscan preacher and author

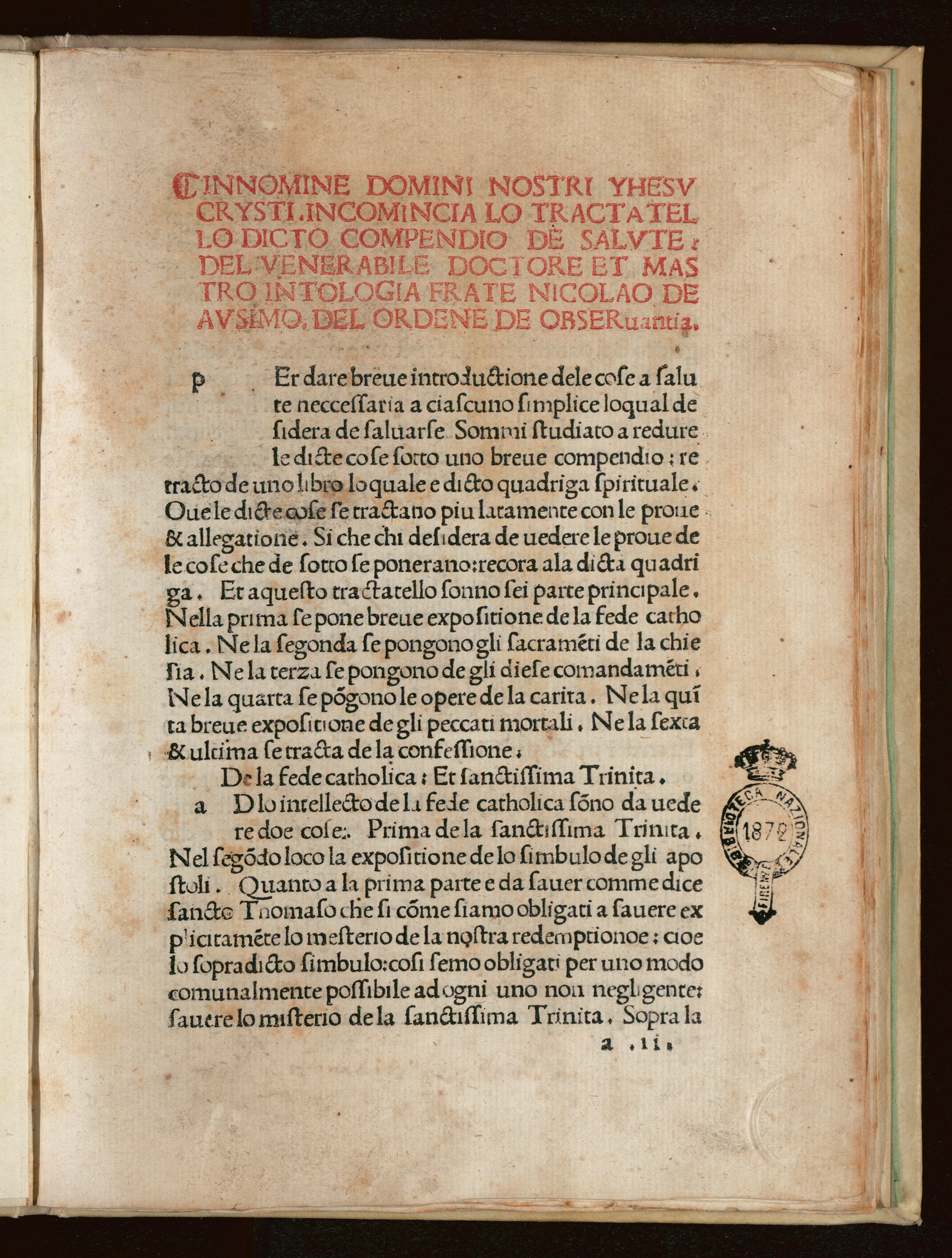
Compendio di salute, 1479

Nicholas of Osimo (Ausmo, Auximanus) (b. at Osimo, Italy, in the second half of the fourteenth century; d. at Rome, 1453) was an Italian Franciscan preacher and author.

== Life ==
After having studied law, and taken the degree of doctor at Bologna, he joined the Friars Minor of the Observants in the convent of San Paolo. Some sources present him as a companion of James of the Marches in Bosnia, but this information is controversial. According to another misinterpretation, he was appointed Custodian of the Franciscan Custody of the Holy Land, although we only know that he was only nominated for the office, which was officially taken by someone else. However, it is certain that Nicholas has been Provincial Vicar of the Franciscan Observants in Apulia (ca. 1439). Between the 1430s and 1440s he mostly dwelled in the Franciscan Observant convents of Bologna, Ferrara, and Milan. He also spent some time in Florence between 1440 and 1441, where in March 1441 delivered a petition to back the autonomy of the Observant family within the Franciscan Order. Not earlier than 1445, he moved to the convent of Santa Maria in Aracoeli in Rome, where he died in 1453. Nicholas greatly contributed to the prosperity of the Observants and supported their independence from the Conventuals.

== Works ==
Nicholas wrote both in Latin and Italian a number of treatises on moral theology, the spiritual life, and on the Rule of St. Francis. They include:

- Supplementum Summae Magistratiae seu Pisanellae, a revised and increased edition of the Summa of Bartholomew of San Concordio (or of Pisa), O.P., completed at Milan, 1444, with many editions before the end of the fifteenth century: Venice, 1473 sqq.; Genoa, 1474; Milan, 1479; Reutlingen, 1483; Nuremberg, 1494.
- Quadriga Spirituale, in Italian, treats in a popular way what the author considers the four principal means of salvation, viz. faith, good works, confession, and prayer. These are like the four wheels of a chariot, whence the name. The work was printed at Jesi, 1475, and under the name of St. Bernardine of Siena in 1494.
- Quadriga litteralis, written in Latin between 1441 and 1446, is a rewriting of the Quadriga Spirituale of which it follows the same structure but the four parts are divided in two books and the content is organised into Tituli which are usually listed in the tabulae at the beginning or at the end of the books. Compared to the Quadriga Spirituale, in the Quadriga litteralis each topic is heavily expanded and integrated with additional sections.
