= Hum, Istria County =

Hum Colmo, Cholm
- Village
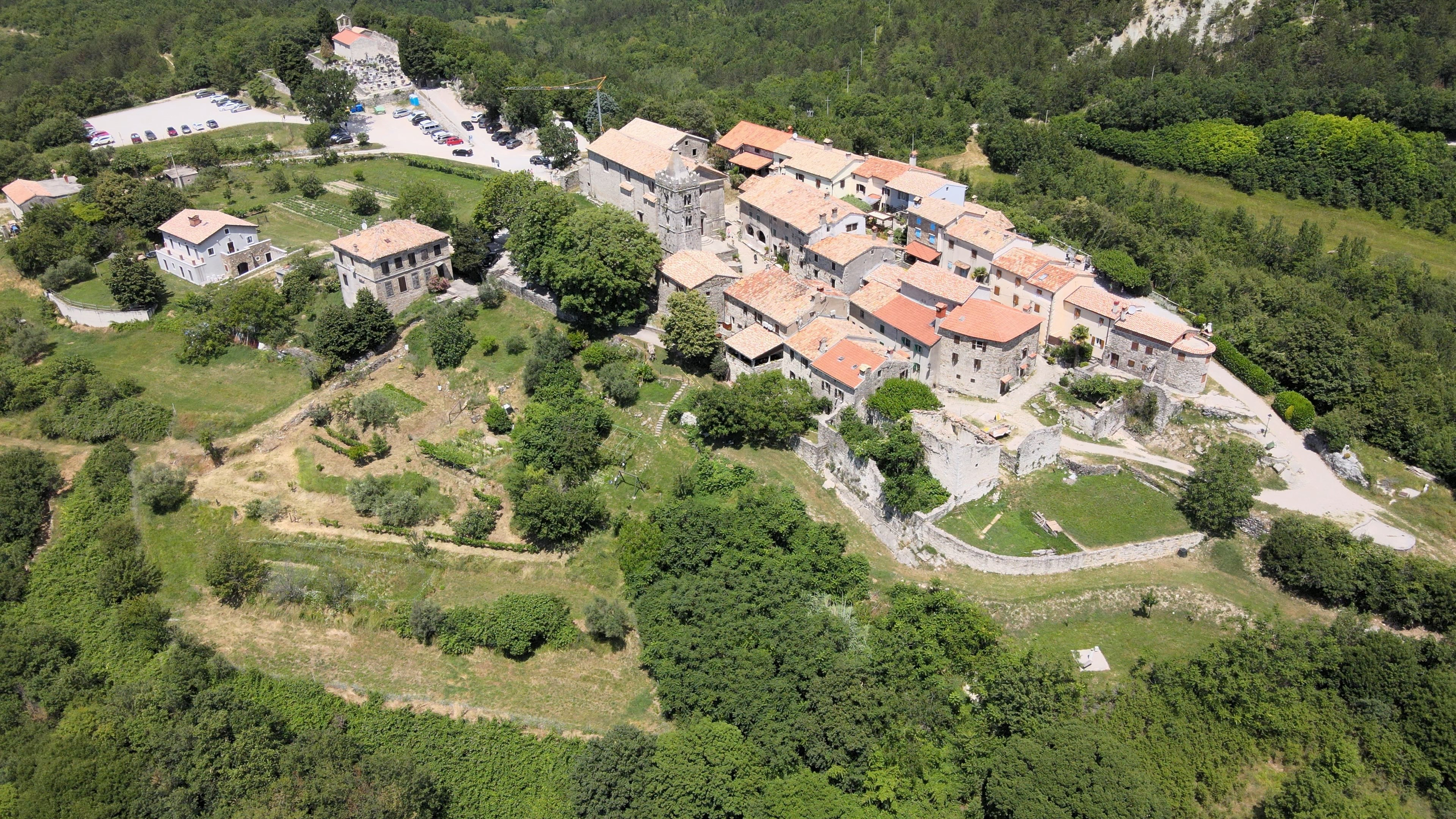
- View of Hum

- Coat of arms

- Location within Croatia
- Coordinates: 45°20′53″N 14°3′0″E
- Country: Croatia
- County: Istria
- Municipality: Buzet

Area
  - Total: 13.0 km^{2} (5.0 sq mi)
- Elevation: 349 m (1,145 ft)

Population (2021)
  - Total: 52
  - Density: 4.0/km^{2} (10/sq mi)
- Time zone: UTC+1 (CET)
  - Summer (DST): UTC+2 (CEST)
- Postal code: 52420 Buzet
- Area code: 052
- Website: www.hum.hr

Hum (Italian: Colmo; German: Cholm) is a settlement, administratively located in the town of Buzet, in the central part of Istria, Croatia. The elevation is 349 meters or 1,145 feet. Hum is considered by some to be one of the smallest towns in the world.

== History ==
On its western side, the town is enclosed by walls and on the remaining sides houses are built into the defensive walls. It was first mentioned in documents dating from 1102, at which time it was called Cholm which is derived from the Italian name Colmo. A bell and watch tower was built in 1552 as part of the town's defenses beside the town loggia.

The town's parish church of the Assumption of Mary, with its classical facade was built in 1802 on the site of an earlier church which was built by the local master Juraj Gržinić.

The "Hum Glagolitic wall writings" are preserved in the church, written in the formative period of Glagolitic (the second half of the 12th century) and they are one of the oldest examples of Croatian Glagolitic literary culture in the Middle Ages. The town's museum displays a few Glagolitic writings.

== Demographics ==
According to the 2021 census, its population was 52. It had a population of 30 people per the 2011 census.

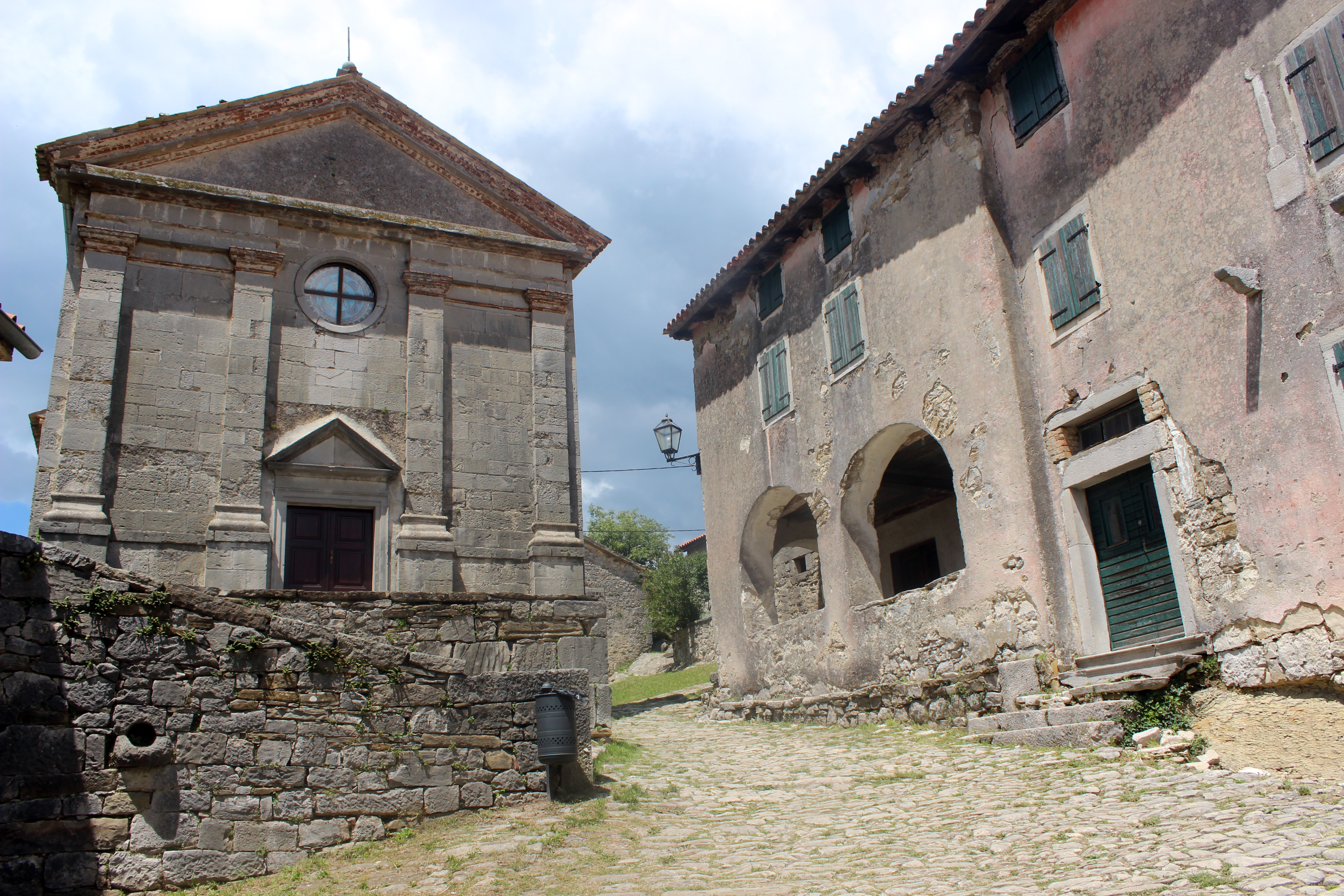
Parish church of the Assumption of Mary

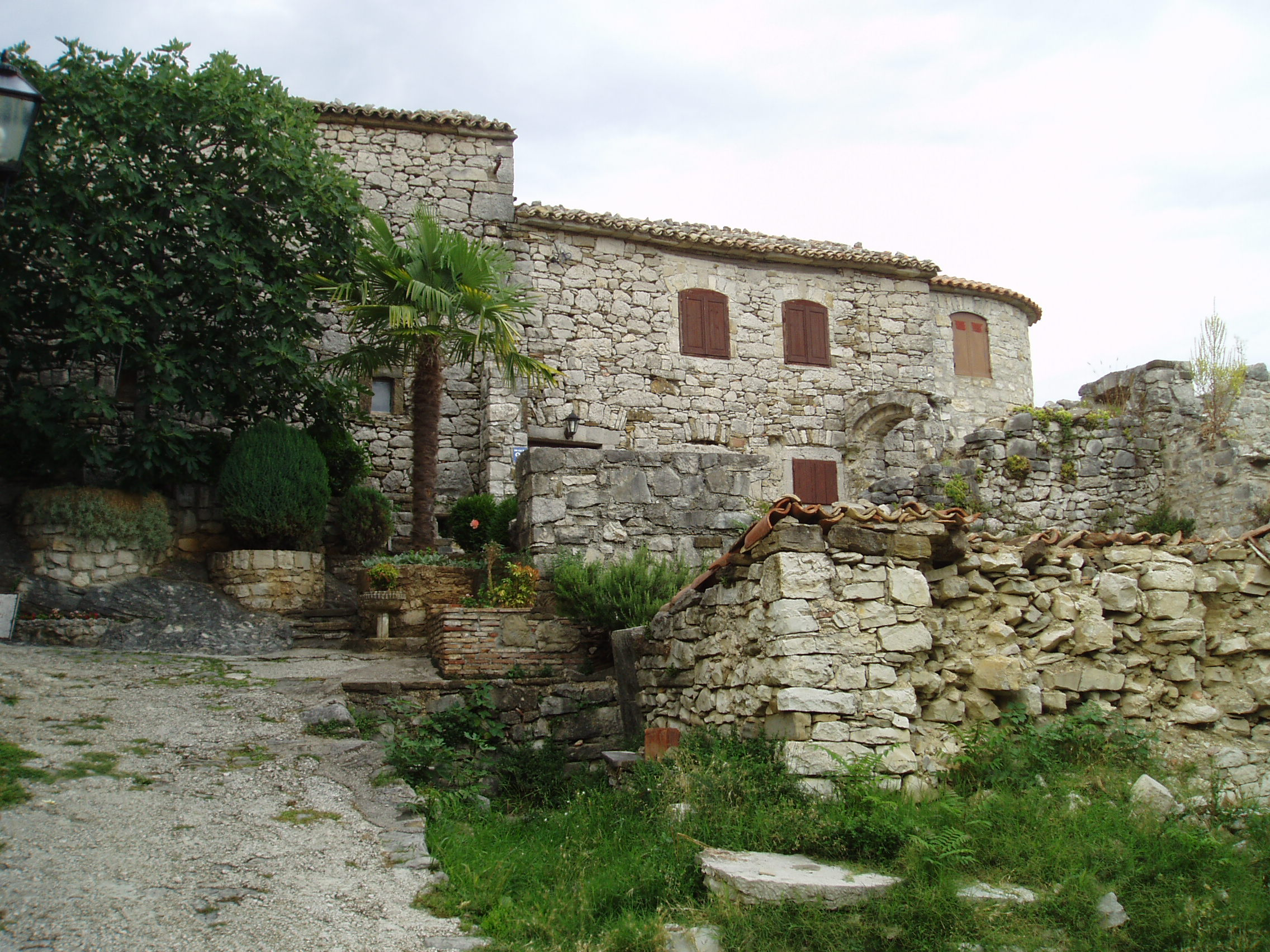
Houses in Hum

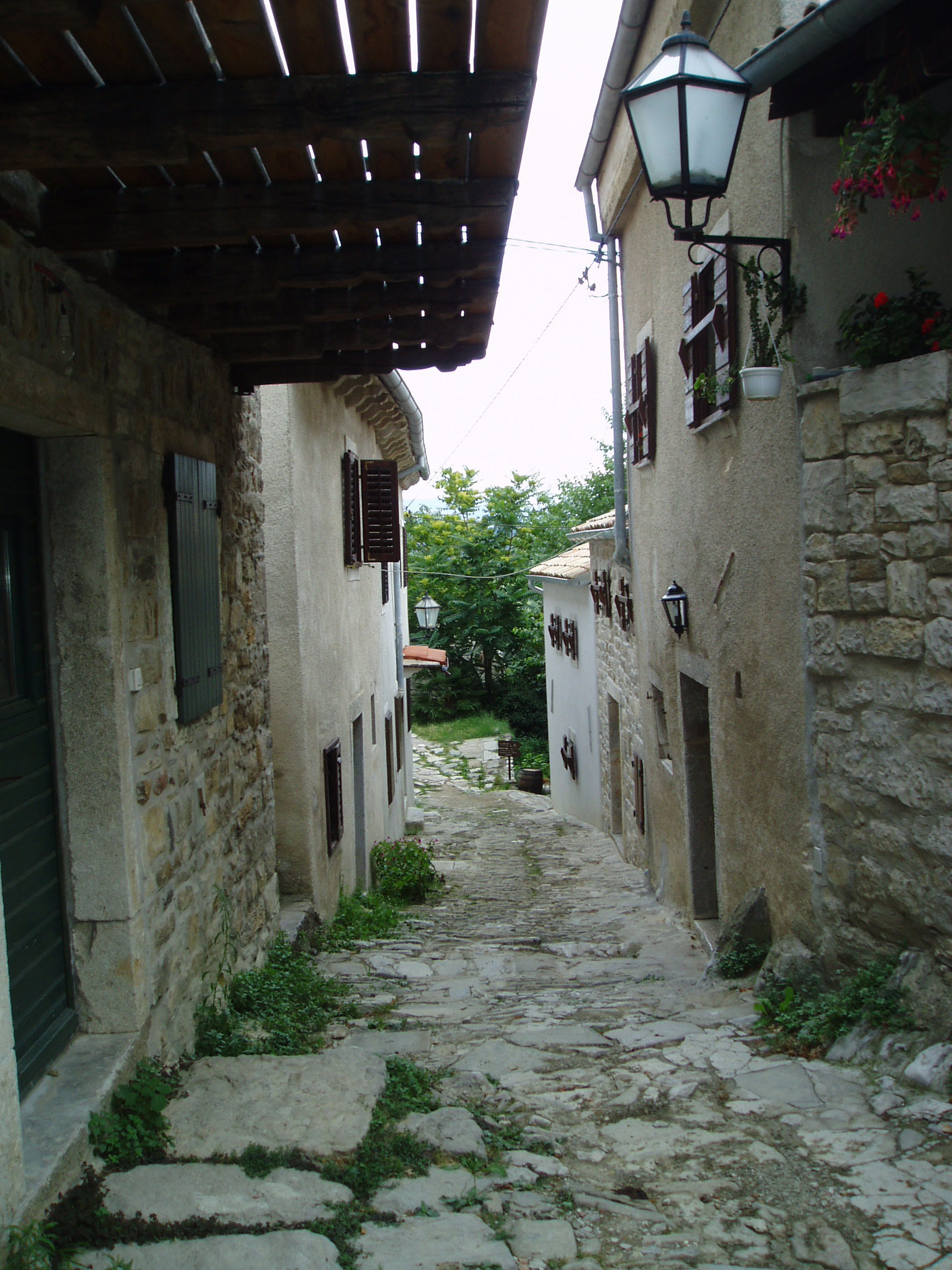
A street in Hum

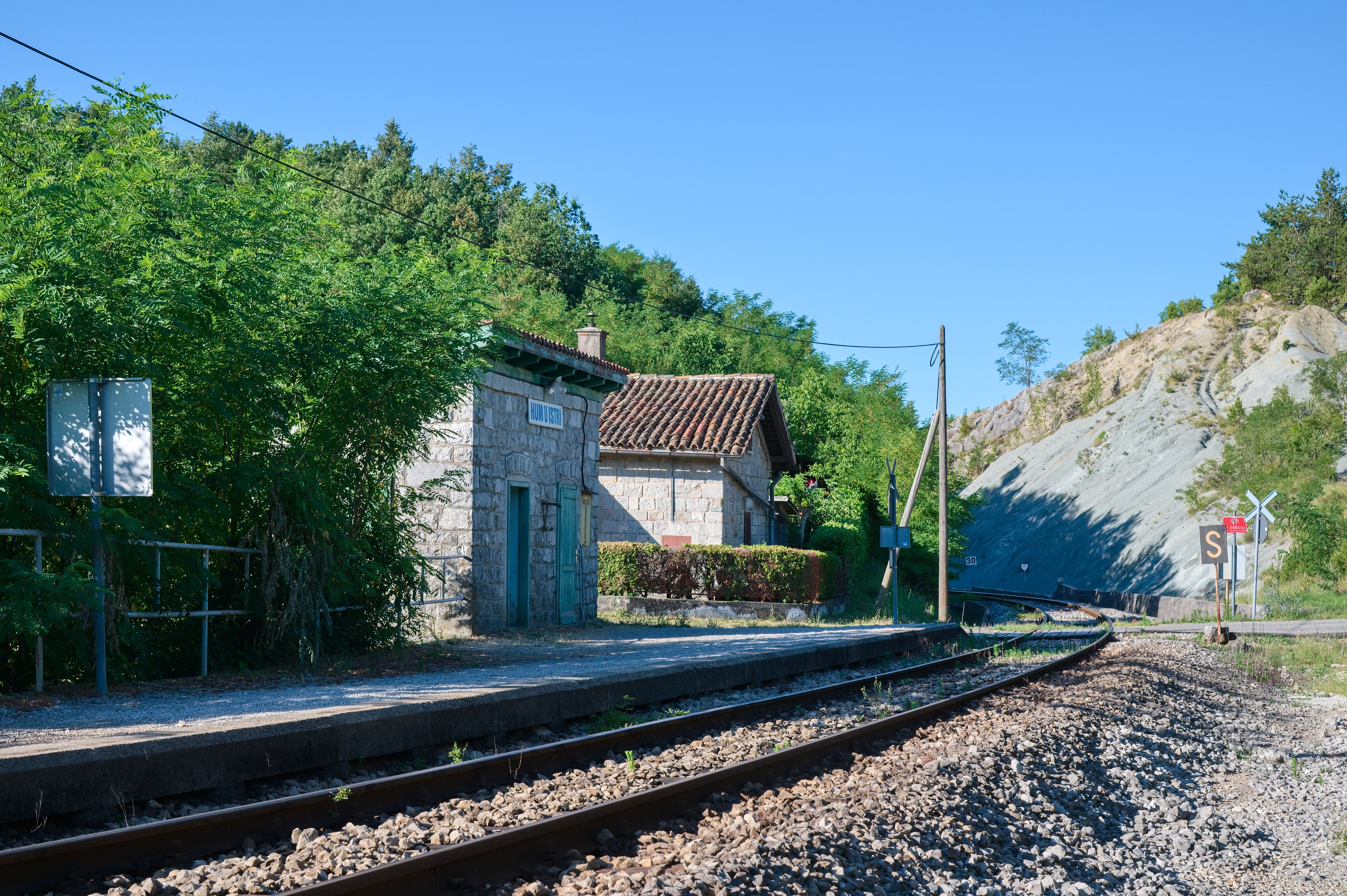
Hum railway station

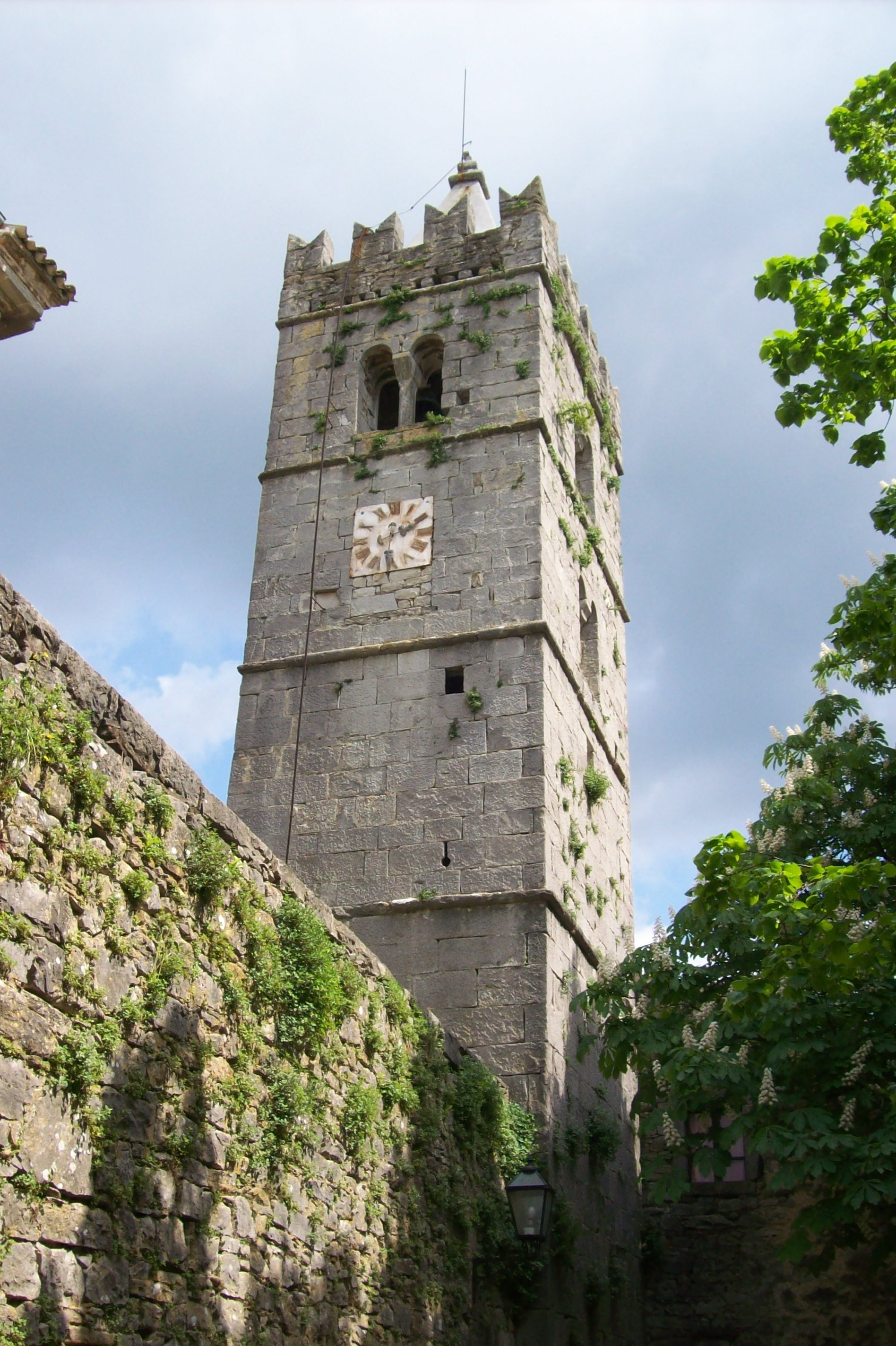
Hum bell tower
