= Roč =

Roč Rozzo
- Village
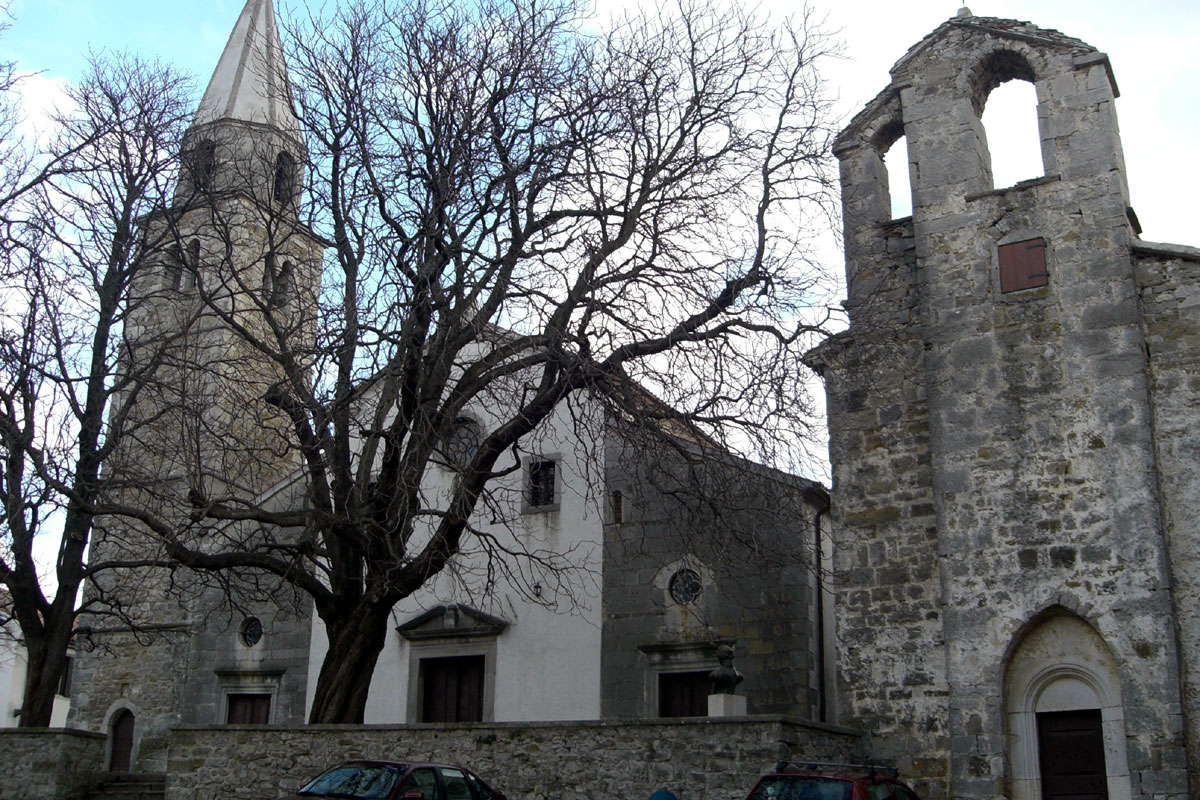
- St Bartholomew's church and St Anthony Abbot's church

- Location within Croatia
- Coordinates: 45°24′N 14°3′E
- Country: Croatia
- County: Istria
- Municipality: Buzet

Area
  - Total: 1.4 sq mi (3.6 km^{2})
- Elevation: 1,142 ft (348 m)

Population (2021)
  - Total: 187
  - Density: 130/sq mi (52/km^{2})
- Time zone: UTC+1 (CET)
  - Summer (DST): UTC+2 (CEST)
- Postal code: 52 425
- Area code: 052

Roč (Italian: Rozzo; German: Rotz) is a village in Istria County, north-west Croatia. Administratively it belongs to the town of Buzet. Roč is considered a historic town rather than a village due to its rich cultural heritage.

== Geography ==
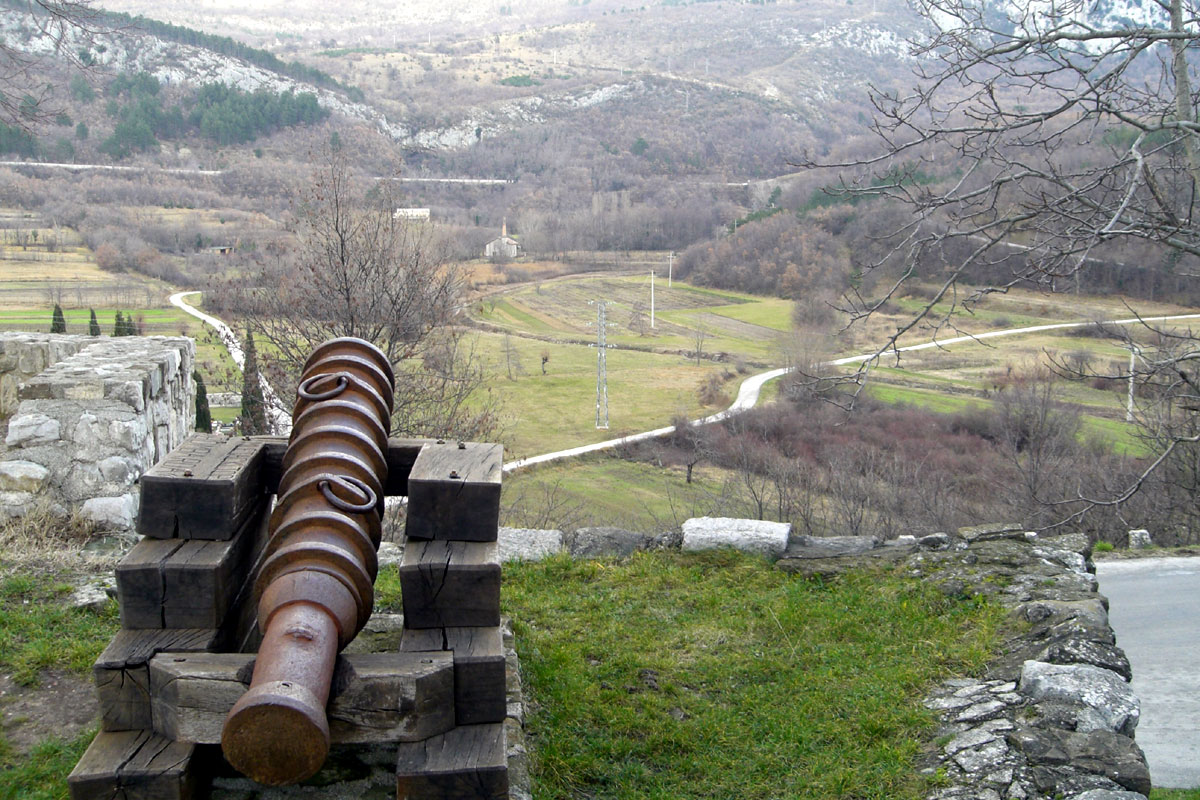
View from town wall

It is situated in the northwest of the Istrian peninsula, southwest of the Ćićarija plateau. The village is located about 50 km (31 mi) south-east of Trieste on the road via Koper and the Učka Tunnel (B8) to Rijeka. Roč station is also a stop on the Istrian Railway (Istarske pruge) line from Divača via Podgorje to Pula.

== History ==
The name Roč or Rozzo derive from the Celtic Roz. The related name Roc is very common in wide areas under Celts influence. The present-day settlement was first mentioned as Rus in a document of 1064. The area was settled in protohistoric times. Romans called it Castrum Rotium or Rocium. The town was founded in prehistory, as an Illyrian settlement. After the Roman Empire incorporation of Istria, it became a Roman castrum, becoming an important settlement for the Romans since the second century BC. Numerous findings from the Roman period were discovered in the area or Roč (Rozzo) and Buzet (Pinguente).

While the former March of Istria was gradually incorporated into the Venetian Stato da Màr, Roč from the 12th century onwards developed to a fortified town and a centre of Slavic literature. The local Church of St. Anthony holds the precious Roč Glagolitic Abecedarium from the 13th century. The first Croatian printed book, the 1483 Missale Romanum Glagolitice, was prepared in Roč by one Juri Žakan. By the 1797 Treaty of Campo Formio, Istria fell to the Habsburg monarchy and later became part of the Austrian Littoral. After World War I and the dissolution of Austria-Hungary, Istria including Rozzo was partitioned to Italy in the Treaty of Rapallo (1920). After the end of World War II, Istria including Rozzo was ceded to Yugoslavia. After the breakup of Yugoslavia in 1991, most of Istria (including Roč) became part of present-day Republic of Croatia.

== Demographics ==
According to the 2021 census, its population was 187. It was 153 in 2011.

== Sights ==
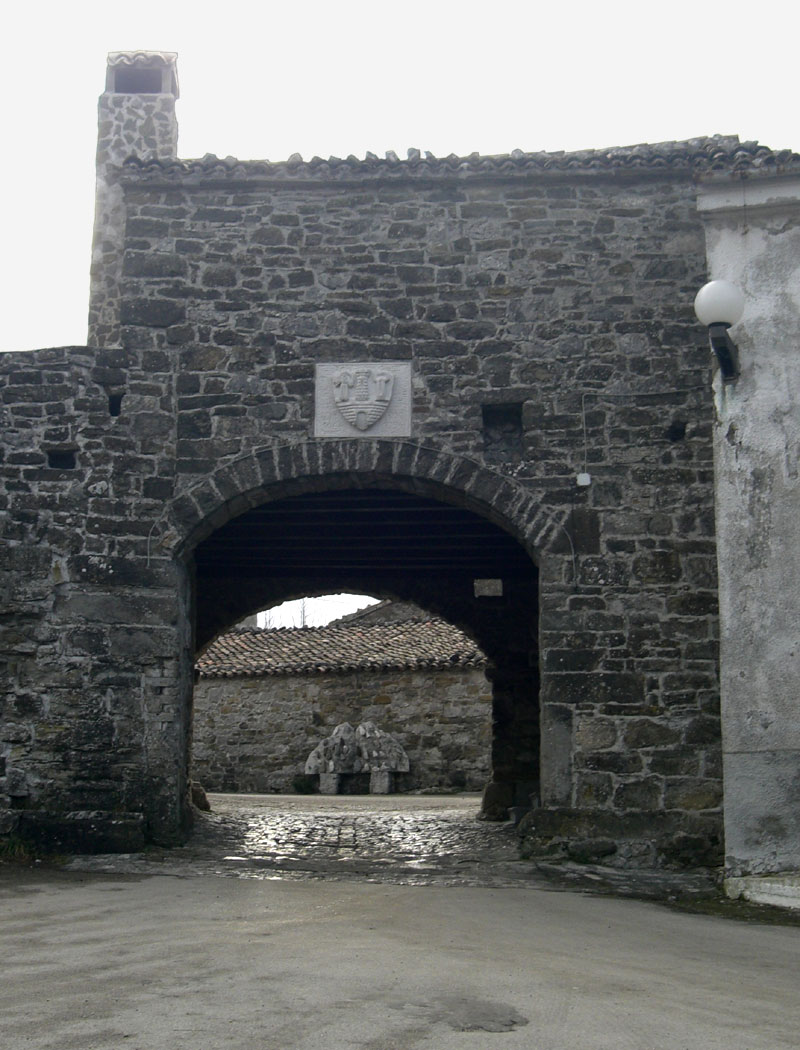
Town gate

The town of Roč is declared by the authorities as an important cultural monument, as it has a well-preserved medieval town walls with two entrances, a Roman lapidarium, a Venetian bombarda cannon and a functional watchtower. Furthermore, it has the Romanesque church of St Anthony dating from the 11th century, the small St Roch Church with several notable 14th-century frescoes representing St Paul and the Apostles, as well as the St Bartholomew parish church built from the 14th century onward with its prominent 26 m (85 ft) high steeple erected in 1676. Numerous other smaller artifacts are preserved in the ancient buildings.

Seven kilometers from Roč is Hum, with a population of only 22 people often called the smallest town in the world. Along the road from Roč to Hum is Glagolitic Alley (Aleja glagoljaša), a scenic route of ten monuments constructed in 1977-81 representing the history of the Glagolitic alphabet.
