= Angular Glagolitic =

Form of the Glagolitic script

Sample of Angular Glagolitic from the "Reims Gospel"

Angular Glagolitic is a style of Glagolitic book hand, developing from the earlier Rounded Glagolitic. Many letters present in Rounded Glagolitic were gradually abandoned: ⱏ, ⱐ, ⱔ, ⱘ, ⱙ, ⱚ, ⱛ and to a large extent ⰿ (replaced with ⱞ) and ⱗ. Others were introduced, like ⱜ.

Glagolitic became the main script among Istrian Slavs in the 11th and 12th centuries, It already had some of the traits that would later make it distinct in form from Rounded Glagolitic, but over time under the influence of multiple waves of monastic exposure to Latinic hands like Beneventan and Blackletter it took on a stable angular shape it would hold for centuries.

Intensified literary activity in the March of Istria and on Frankopan family domains in the 13th century secured for Angular Glagolitic the status of this Uncial script over a wide area, and although a chancery hand soon complemented it, not all notaries and chancellors adopted it immediately, with some using Angular Glagolitic in all domains into the 14th century.

The chancery hand, known as Cursive Glagolitic, was originally angular in form, though over time it became more rounded. It partially replaced Rounded Glagolitic as a book hand in the 15th-16th centuries, especially with the onset of printing. The resulting situation was similar to the Byzantine Greek division into uncial and minuscule. A smaller form of Glagolitic analogous in use to Greek minuscule was already in existence by the time of the earliest surviving manuscripts, but it differed little graphically. Some Rounded Glagolitic forms like Ⰰ and Ⰲ survived into printed works as initials, and others like Ⰻ and Ⰿ survived late into the manuscript age. But although complex camerality continued, a state of highly differentiated "tricamerality" like that of the Armenian script or the Georgian script did not evolve in printed works.

Cursive Glagolitic survived as a book hand longer than in Western Europe thanks to a lack of printing presses that were able or willing to satisfy the demand. Angular Glagolitic secured its status as the script of print thanks to its continued use for the most sacred texts, without any threat in this domain until the 19th century. In the 19th century, the rediscovery of Rounded Glagolitic manuscripts led to both Rounded and Angular type being sold to various printers. The Rounded form became dominant in Slavistics, while the Angular form was mainly used in books printed in Prague, Vienna and Zagreb and intended for an audience where the form had an historical presence. Some of the longest books printed with Angular Glagolitic in that century were Ivan Berčić's 1864-1871 Ulomci svetoga pisma and Dragutin Parčić's 1893 and 1895 Missale Romanum slavonico idiomate. One of the last liturgical books printed with Angular Glagolitic in the pre-Communist period was Josef Vajs' 1917 Abecedarium Palaeoslovenicum.

Although Rounded Glagolitic replaced Angular Glagolitic even in liturgical use in Czechoslovakia even before the publication of the 1992 missal, it remains the preferred form among Slovenes and Croats.

== Legacy ==
Croatian Studies also refer Angular Glagolitic as Croatian Glagolitic. (Note: The term "Croatian Glagolitic" or "Croato-Glagolitic" is also used to refer to Rounded Glagolitic and Cursive Glagolitic texts together with Angular Glagolitic texts when grouped by language or provenance, so "Angular Glagolitic" is the more precise term.)

== See also ==
- Lists of Glagolitic inscriptions
- List of Glagolitic manuscripts
- List of Glagolitic printed works
