= Zlatan =

- Pronunciation: [zlǎtan]
- Gender: male
- Language: Bosnian

Origin
- Origin: Slavic
- Meaning: golden

Other names
- Variant forms: Zlata, Zlatka, Zlatica (f); Zlatko (m)

Zlatan or Slatan (Serbian Cyrillic: Златан) is a masculine given name of Slavic origin meaning Golden. The name is common amongst all South Slavic countries, namely in Bosnia and Herzegovina, Bulgaria, Croatia, North Macedonia and Serbia. The name is found in particularly high frequencies in Bosnia because it is considered ethnically neutral amongst the three dominant Bosnian ethnicities: Bosniaks, Serbs and Croats. The name is derived from the South Slavic word zlato – from the Old Slavic root zolto (gold). Notable people with the name include:

== Given name ==
=== Slatan ===
- Slatan Dudow (1903–1963), Bulgarian-German film director and screenwriter

=== Zlatan ===
- Zlatan (musician) (born 1994), Nigerian rapper and singer
- Zlatan Alomerović (born 1991), German-Bosniak footballer
- Zlatan Arnautović (born 1956), Serbian handball player
- Zlatan Azinović (born 1988), Swedish-Bosnian footballer
- Zlatan Bajramović (born 1979), Bosnian football player and coach
- Zlatan Čolaković (1955–2008), Croatian and Bosnian researcher
- Zlatan Stipišić Gibonni (born 1968), Croatian musician
- Zlatan Ibrahimbegović (1948–2026), Yugoslav slalom canoeist
- Zlatan Ibrahimović (born 1981), Swedish footballer of Bosnian and Croatian descent
- Zlatan Jovanović (born 1963), Serbian politician
- Zlatan Krizanović (born 1991), Swedish footballer
- Zlatan Ljubijankić (born 1983), Slovenian-Bosnian footballer
- Zlatan Muslimović (born 1981), Bosnian footballer
- Zlatan Nalić (born 1969), Bosnian football manager and player
- Zlatan Saračević (born 1956), Bosnian shot putter
- Zlatan Šehović (born 2000), Serbian footballer
- Zlatan Stoykov (born 1951), Bulgarian general
- Zlatan Vanev (born 1973), Bulgarian weightlifter

== See also ==
- Slavic names
