= Zlatkov =

Zlatkov (Bulgarian: Златков) is a surname derived from a masculine given name Zlatko. Notable people with the surname include:

- Daniel Zlatkov (born 1989), Bulgarian footballer
- Petar Zlatkov (born 1984), Bulgarian footballer
