= Church of St. Dunat =

Coordinates: 45°02′24″N 14°37′12″E

Church of Saint Dunat
- Crkva svetog Dunata
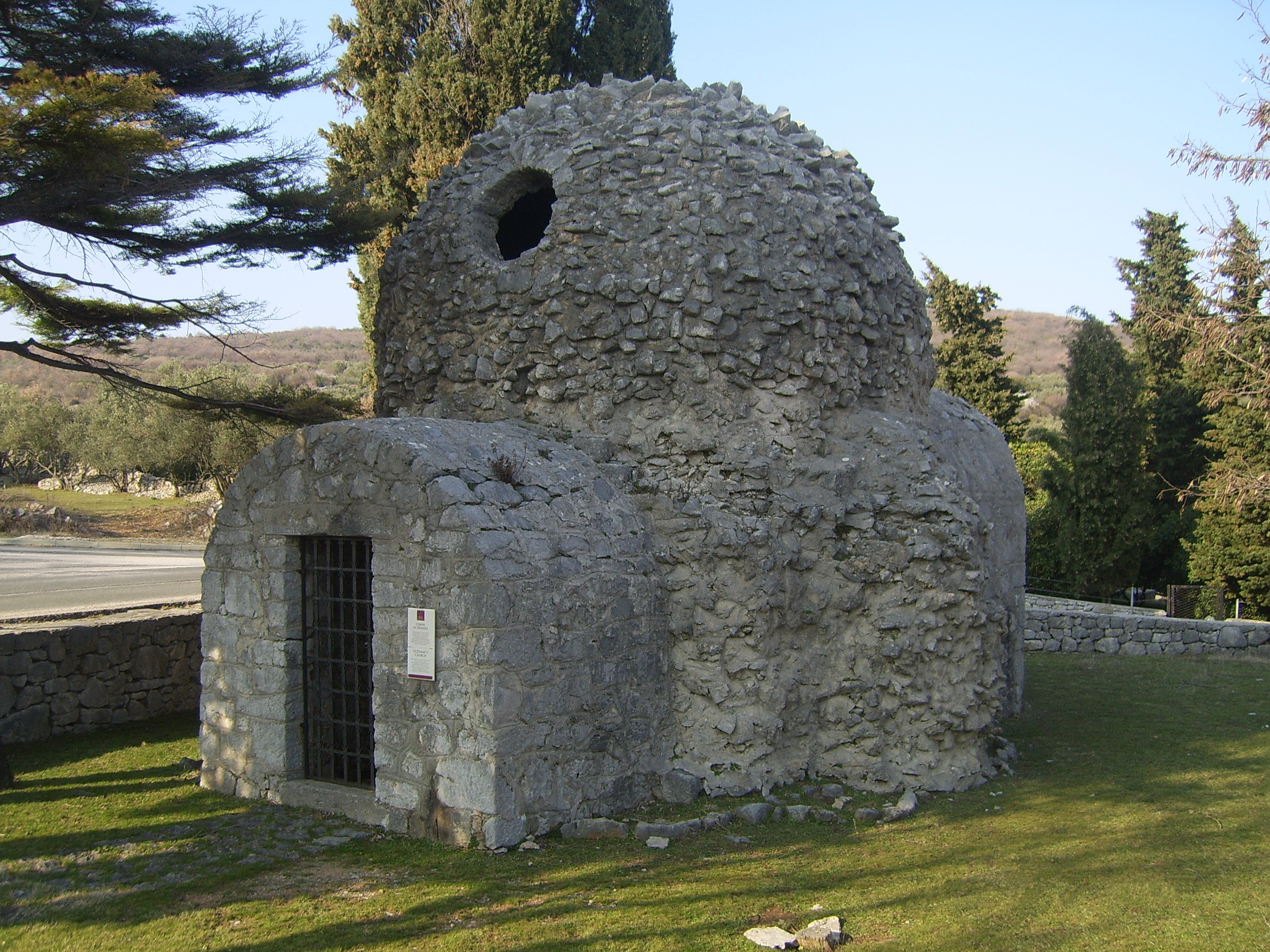
- Church of Saint Dunat
- Location: Krk
- Country: Croatia
- Denomination: Roman Catholic

History
- Founded: 12th century

The Church of St. Dunat (Croatian: Crkva svetog Dunata) is a Roman Catholic church located on the island of Krk, Croatia.

== Geography ==
The church was built at the intersection of roads leading to Punat, Krk, Kornić and Vrbnik at the bottom of Bay of Punat, by the sea.

== The significance, dating and form ==
With the churches in Nin and Zadar, this one is the most important monument of early Croatian architecture. It cannot be determined with certainty when it was constructed. Possibly, it was built in the 9th century. However, the information board near the church states that it was built in the 12th century.

Church has a four-leafed cruciform layout, square entrance and base with a dome covering it. Present-day appearance is undoubtedly significantly different from the previous, when it was covered with carved stone from the outside, which can still be seen only at the bottom. It was probably decorated with mosaics and frescoes from the inside. It seems as if the unskilled master built it entirely spontaneously with no accurate measures and models.

== First mention ==
Church was first mentioned in year 1565 when the Bishop Pietro Bembo visited the area, and had examined witnesses which stated that the church was donated by bishop Donato della Torre (1484-1515) to the owners of terrains around Kornić. After his death, they have sold terrains which was followed by the period of edifices deterioration. During the visit of bishop Donat, a poor condition of church was determined. It was mentioned that it didn't have floor nor the door, while only preserved was altar.

== Dedication ==
Church is dedicated to St. Dunat (not to be mistaken with Donatus of Zadar), an early Christian saint who was martyred during the persecution of emperor Julian the Apostate in the second half of the 4th century. It is not known whom it was originally dedicated to.

== History of deterioration and renovation ==
In addition to previously mentioned churches poor state, there is no other information about it so it can be assumed that it wasn't used for holding Holy Mass but was in the process of deterioration over the years. Church was restored in 1914 thanks to the Austrian conservator Anton Gnirs from Pula. However, immediately after World War II it was again damaged. Namely, in the immediate vicinity of the church was an inn of Maračić family where Yugoslav Partisans stored their weapons and ammunition during the war. On 3 October 1945 the explosion that badly damaged church, namely its dome, occurred. The explosion was so strong that it was heard all over the island. 15 islanders who have sought refuge in the surrounding fields and along the coast were killed while the area of the inn turned into a crater. Three years later, the church was restored to its present-day appearance. The renovation was led by the architect Aleksandar Freudenreich. At the site of the former inn was built another one, while a small harbor was built nearby.

== Gallery ==
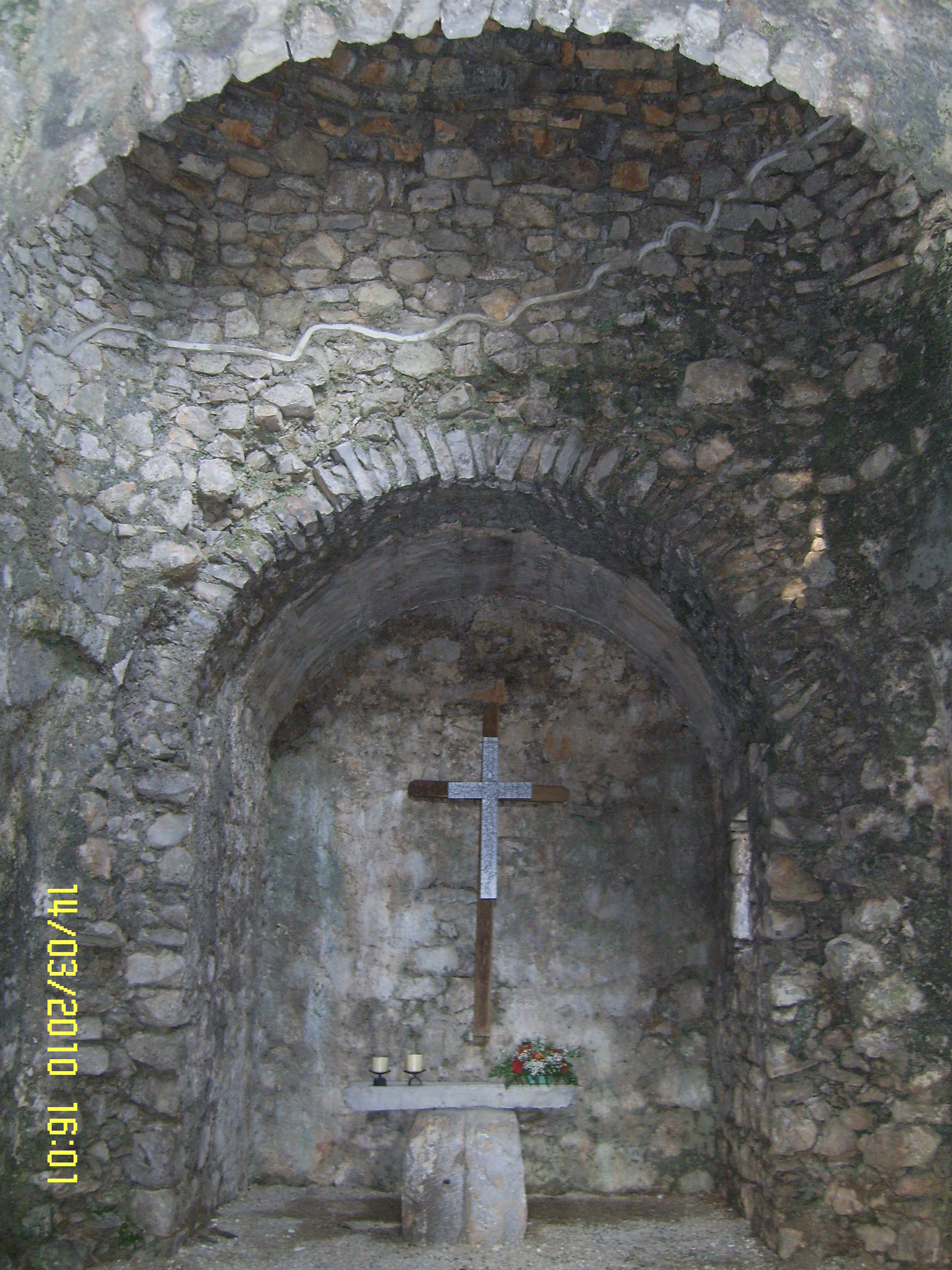

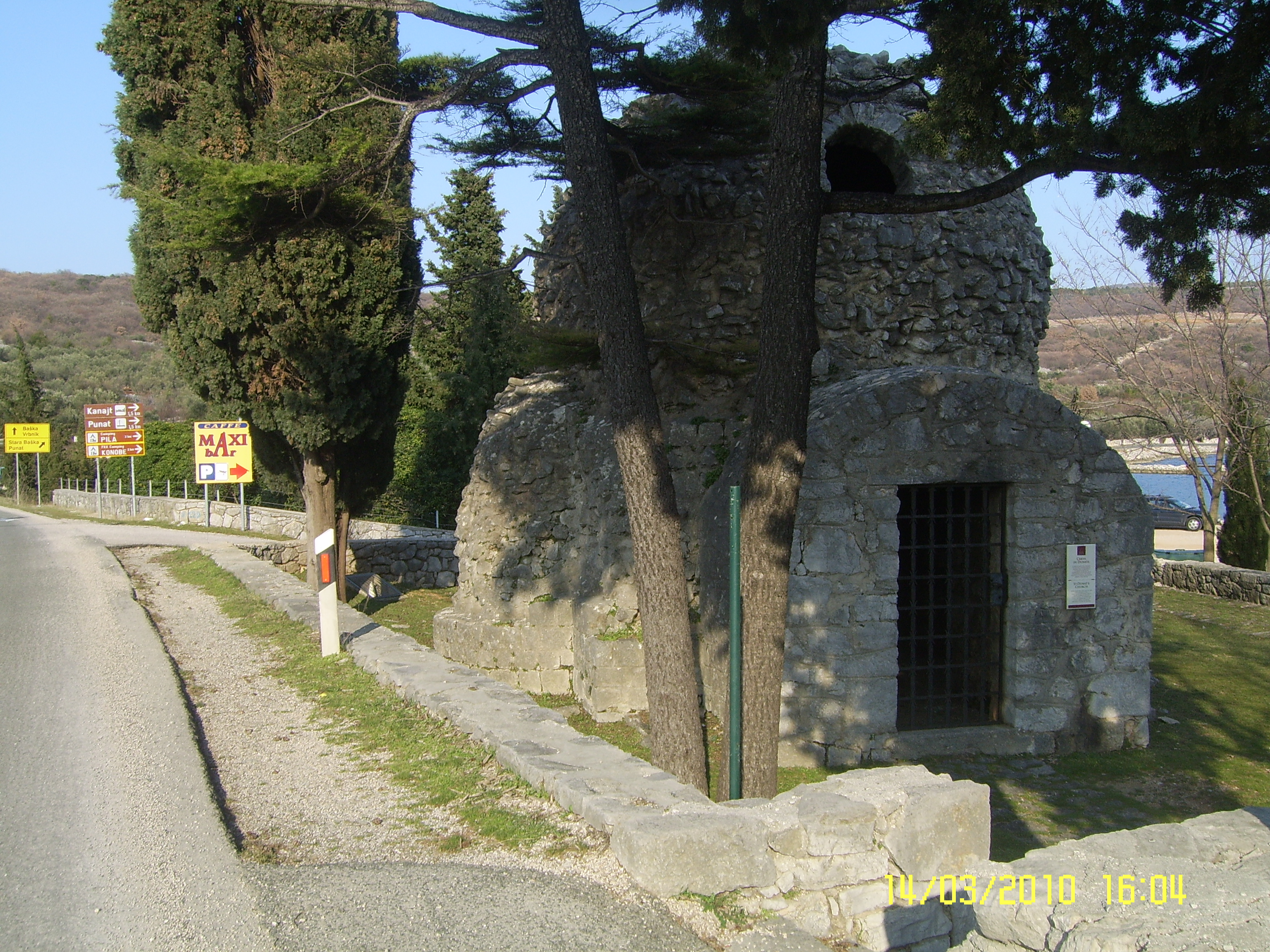

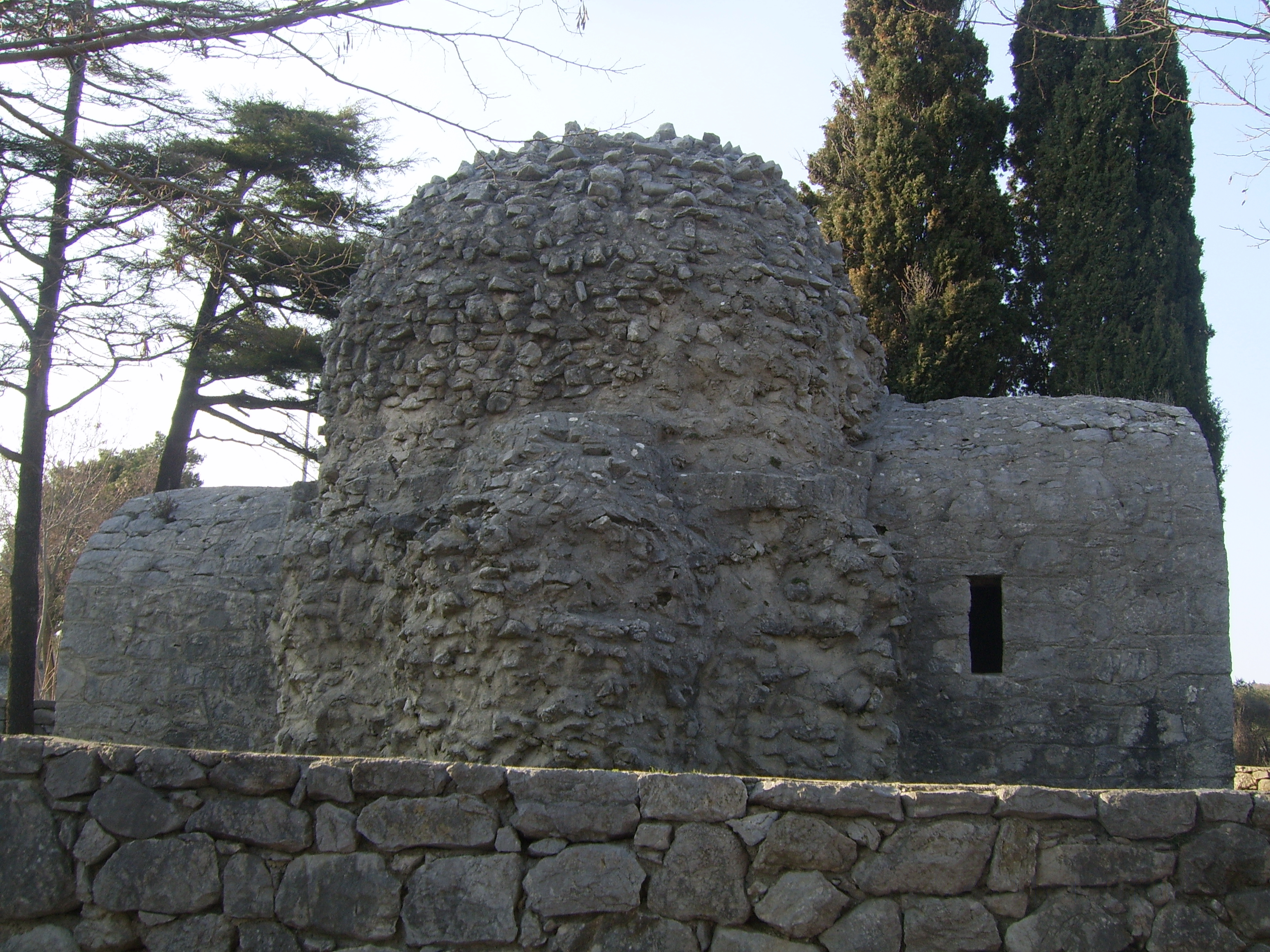

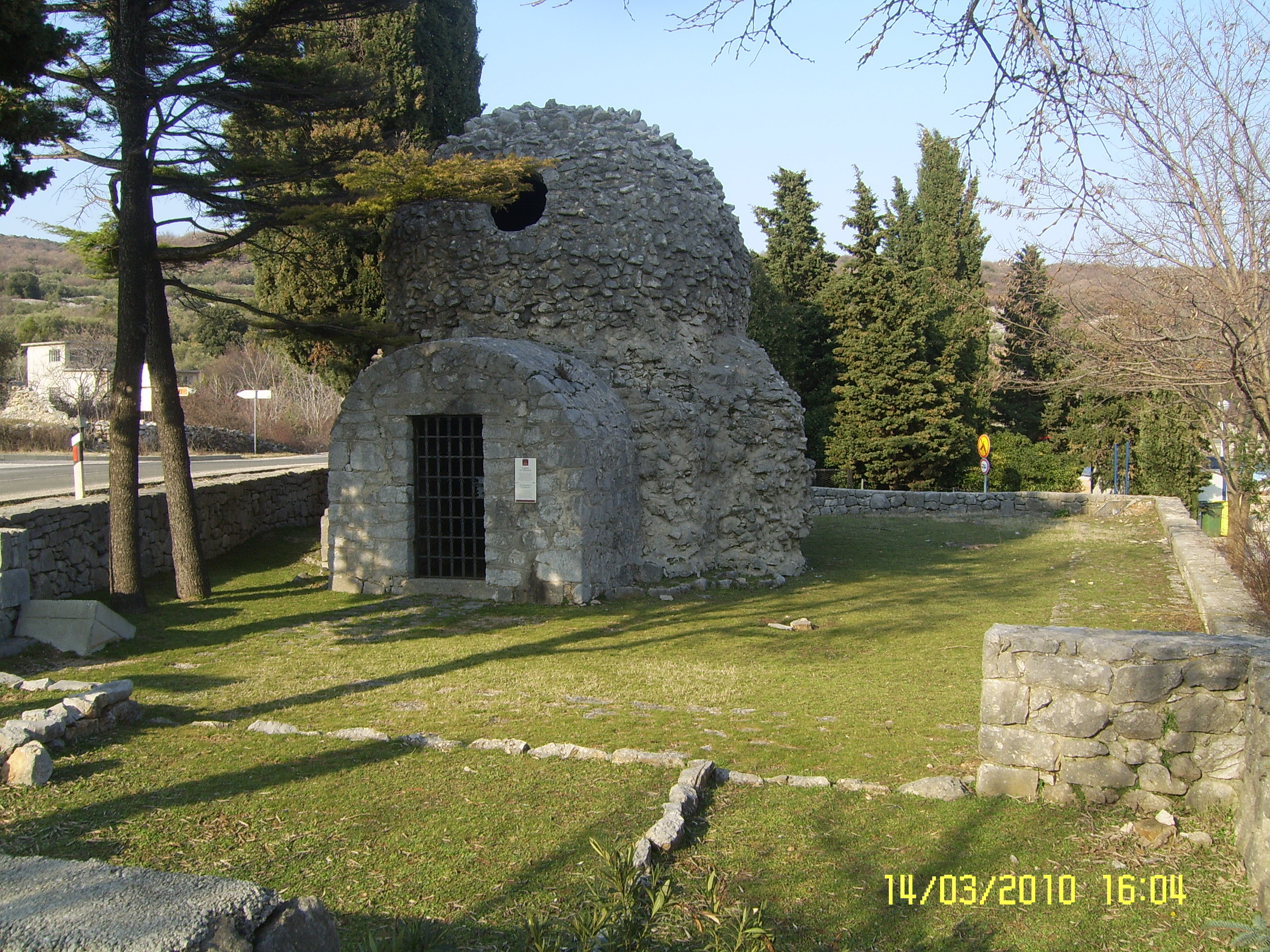

== Sources ==
- Bolonić, Mihovil, Žic Rokov, Ivan: Otok Krk kroz vijekove, Kršćanska sadašnjost, Zagreb, 2002., ISBN 953-151-493-3
- Ragužin, Alojzije: Punat 1, Povijesno društvo otoka Krka, Krk, 1991.
- Lešić, Denis: Otok Krk - vodič u riječi i slici, 2003.
