= Punat =

- Municipality
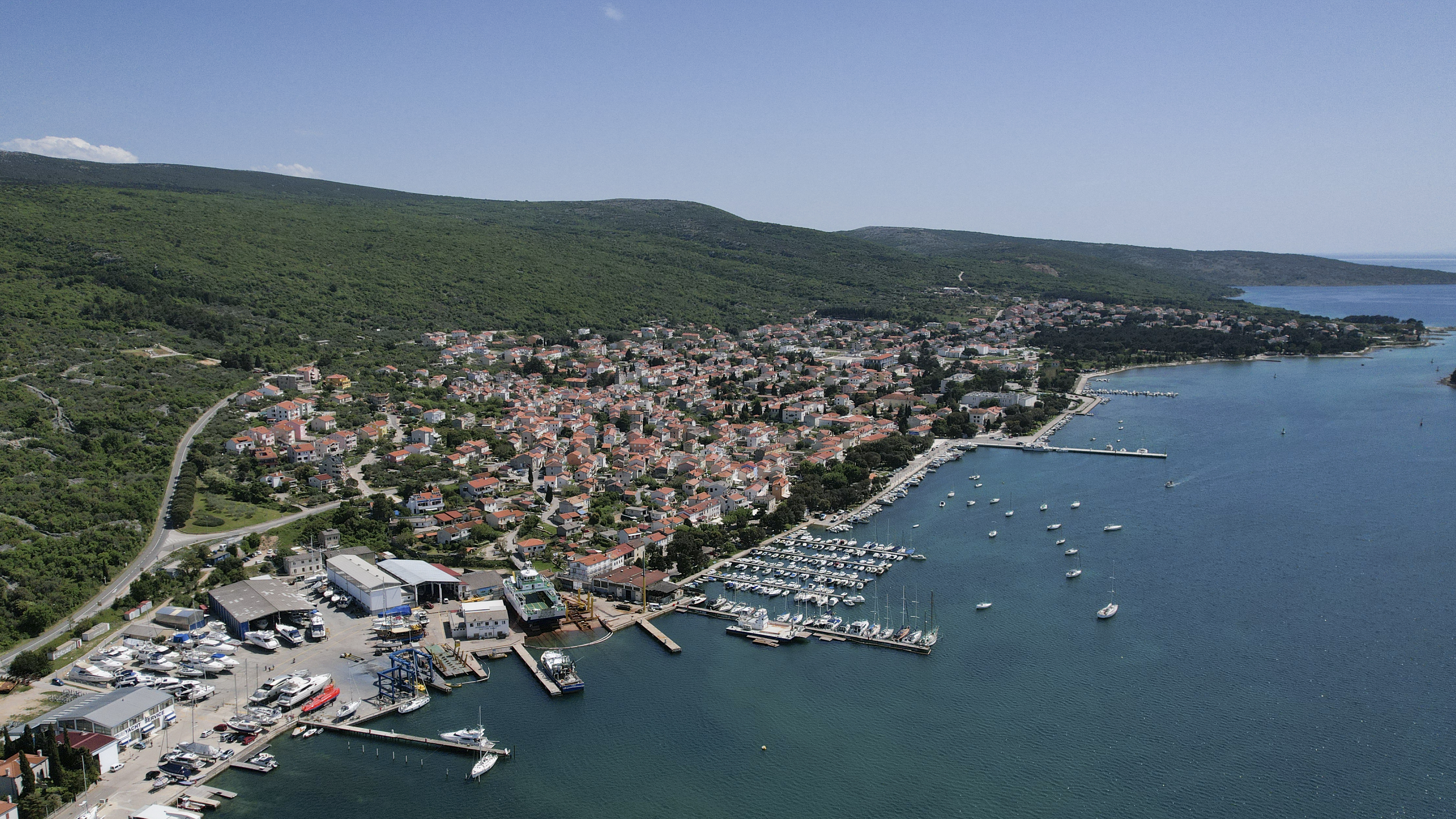

- Location of Punat in Croatia
- Coordinates: 45°00′52.92″N 14°37′44.04″E
- Country: Croatia
- County: Primorje-Gorski Kotar County
- Settlements: Punat, Stara Baška

Government
  - Mayor: Daniel Strčić

Area
  - Municipality: 34.0 km^{2} (13.1 sq mi)
  - Urban: 20.6 km^{2} (8.0 sq mi)

Population (2021)
  - Municipality: 1,900
  - Density: 56/km^{2} (140/sq mi)
  - Urban: 1,784
  - Urban density: 86.6/km^{2} (224/sq mi)
- Postal code: 51521
- Website: punat.hr

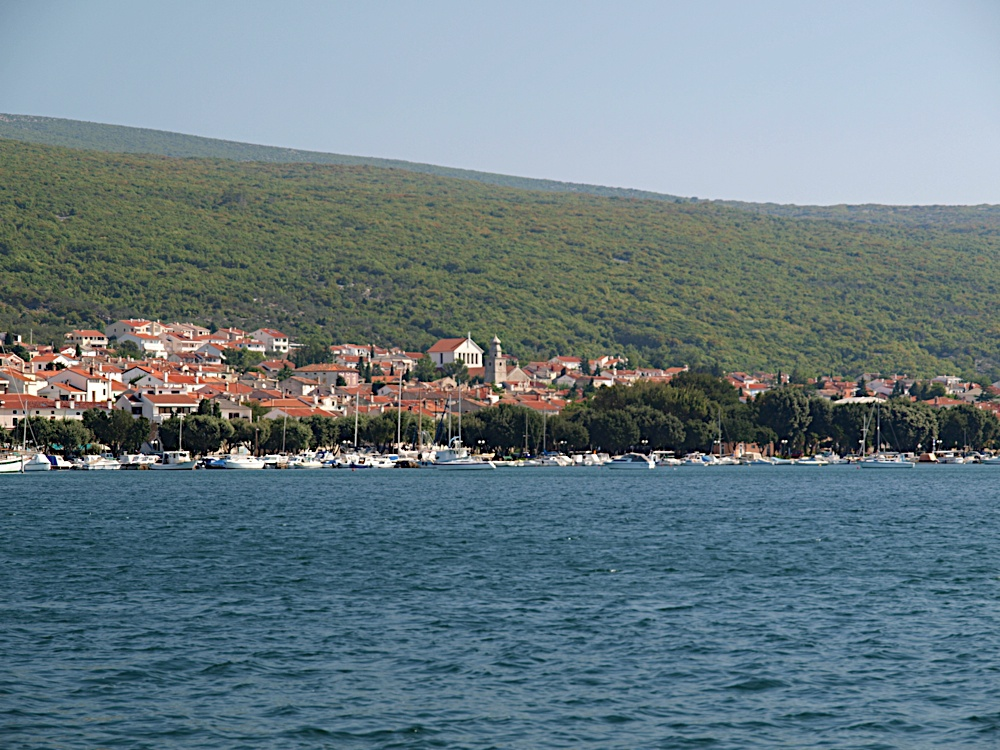
Punat

Punat is a municipality in the Primorje-Gorski Kotar County in western Croatia on the island of Krk. The municipality has a population of 1,900, with 90% Croats (2021). With Stara Baška being the only other settlement in the municipality, the village of Punat itself has a population of 1,784. The town first appears in writings from 1377 AD, but the exact date of its foundation is not known. It is situated on a bay known for the island of Košljun and the Church of St. Dunat.

== History ==
During WWII, Punat was home to several sympathizers of the Yugoslav Army in the Homeland, including Filka and Marica Žic, who were sentenced by the Communists to hard labor.

On 25 February 1993, the ferry Kajčak was hit by SAK artillery at Maslenica and towed to Punat.

== Religion ==
Its Catholic parish was founded in 1853, and its parish church was built in 1773, expanded in 1934. In 1939, its parish had 2320 souls, plus 400 outside the country.

List of parish priests of Punat:

- Ivan Šparožić (b. Vrbnik 1876-11-06, primiz Krk 1900-10-14)
  - Chaplain Karmelo Zazinović

== Governance ==
=== Local ===
It is the seat of its own local committee.

== Notable people ==
Notable people that were born or lived in Punat include:

- Antun Bonifačić (1901–1986), Ustaša politician
- Francisco Orlich Bolmarcich (1907–1969), 34th President of Costa Rica
- Anton Tamarut (1932-2000), parish priest of Punat 1976-1979
- Japec Jakopin (b. 1951), boat designer
- Vjekoslav Ključarić (b. 1992), musician

== Bibliography ==
- OONF PGO (1945-01-19). "Sudjenje neprijateljima NOP-a u Hrv. Primorju". Primorski vjesnik (in Serbo-Croatian). Vol. 3, no. 140. p. 4.
- Draganović, Krunoslav (1939-04-20). Opći šematizam Katoličke crkve u Jugoslaviji. Sarajevo: Akademija "Regina Apostolorum".
