= Zlatković =

Zlatković (Serbian: Златковић) is a surname found in Serbia and Croatia, derived from a masculine given name Zlatko. Notable people with the surname include:

- Danijel Zlatković (born 1996), Serbian footballer
- Miloš Zlatković (born 1997), Serbian footballer
- Nemanja Zlatković (born 1988), Serbian footballer
- Siniša Zlatković, Yugoslav footballer
