= Dubravko Mataković (illustrator) =

Croatian illustrator (born 1959)

Dubravko Mataković (born 20 August 1959) is a Croatian illustrator best known for his grotesque comic books.

== Biography ==
Mataković was born in Ivankovo near Vinkovci, and graduated from the Academy of Fine Arts, University of Zagreb in 1983. He has published comics since 1984. His work was published in the newspapers Nedjeljna Dalmacija, Jutarnji list, as well as children's newspapers Smib and Modra lasta. He teaches at the Fine Arts Academy in Osijek.

Among his most popular characters are little Ivica, his mother Veresija, Glištun Gmižić, Vitomir and Marva Škakljikavdžija, inspector Dane (visually conceived as a parody of Lee Falk's The Phantom) and the superhero Protman, a mutant crime-fighter who is able to fly, propelled by his intestinal gasses.

In 2003, Mataković co-founded heavy metal/punk band called Septica, that published an eponymous album Septica for Aquarius Records in 2006.

The city theatre in Vinkovci produced a play based on Mataković's strip characters, in which Mataković himself produced the scene, costumes, and most of the music.
