= Miloje Savić =

Serbian politician

Miloje Savić (Serbian Cyrillic: Милоје Савић; born 18 July 1958) is a Serbian politician. He served in the National Assembly of Serbia from 2004 to 2007 and was the mayor of Bajina Bašta from 2004 to 2011. Savić is a member of the Socialist Party of Serbia (Socijalistička partija Srbije, SPS).

== Private career ==
Savić holds a Bachelor of Laws degree.

== Politician ==
Savić received the 205th position (out of 250) on the SPS's electoral list in the 2000 Serbian parliamentary election. The list won thirty-seven seats, and he was not selected for a mandate. (From 2000 to 2011, mandates in Serbian parliamentary elections were awarded to sponsoring parties or coalitions rather than individual candidates, and it was common practice for the mandates to be distributed out of numerical order. Savić could have been given a seat despite his position on the list, which was in any event mostly alphabetical, though he was not.)

=== Parliamentarian ===
Savić was given the 206th position on the Socialist Party's list in the 2003 parliamentary election and was this time included in his party's assembly delegation after the list won twenty-two seats. The Socialists provided outside support to Serbia's coalition government for the term that followed. Savić served as chair of the committee for environmental protection.

He received the 194th position on the SPS's list for the 2007 parliamentary election. The party fell to sixteen seats, and he was not chosen for a new mandate.

=== Mayor of Bajina Bašta ===
Serbia introduced the direct election of mayors for the 2004 Serbian local elections. Savić ran as the Socialist Party's candidate in Bajina Bašta and was elected in the second round of voting. The Socialists did not win the concurrent election for the municipal assembly, and for at least part of Savić's first term the party was excluded from the local coalition administration, serving in opposition.

In 2005, Savić was appointed by the Serbian government to lead a committee commemorating one hundred years of tourism on Mount Tara. Two years later, he oversaw the approval of a plan to permit legal construction on parts of the Tara National Park; the purpose of this initiative was to prevent illegal construction and protect the most environmentally sensitive areas.

The direct election of mayors proved to be a short-lived experiment and was ended with the 2008 local elections. Since this time, Serbian mayors have been chosen by the elected delegates of the relevant city or municipal assemblies.

Savić led the Socialists to a fourth-place finish in Bajina Bašta in 2008, with the party winning eight seats out of forty-five. The SPS formed a coalition government with the Democratic Party (Demokratska stranka, DS) after the election; as part of the coalition arrangement, Savić continued to serve as mayor. He was removed from office in April 2011, when a new coalition led by the Serbian Radical Party (Srpska radikalna stranka, SRS) and the Democratic Party of Serbia (Demokratska stranka Srbije, DSS) came to power.

=== Political activities since 2011 ===
Serbia's electoral system was reformed in 2011, such that all mandates were assigned to candidates on successful lists in numerical order. Savić was elected to the Bajina Bašta municipal assembly in the 2012 Serbian local elections and served for the term that followed.

He was given the 118th position on the SPS's list in the 2016 Serbian parliamentary election and was not returned to the national assembly when the list won twenty-nine seats. He also led the SPS's list for Bajina Bašta in the concurrent 2016 local elections and was re-elected locally when the list won nine seats. The Serbian Progressive Party (Srpska napredna stranka, SNS) fell two seats short of a majority in the local election and afterward formed a coalition government that included the Socialist Party. Savić was appointed to the municipal council (i.e., the executive branch of the local government) on 26 May 2016. His term was brief; he resigned on 4 November 2016.

Savić received the second position on the SPS's list for Bajina Bašta in the 2020 local elections and was re-elected when the list again won nine seats. He resigned his mandate on 18 August 2020.

== Electoral record ==
=== Local (Bajina Bašta) ===
2004 Bajina Bašta local election: Mayor of Bajina Bašta
Candidate	Party	First round		Second round	
Candidate	Party	Votes	%	Votes	%
Miloje Savić	Socialist Party of Serbia			4,789	51.38
Boban Tomić (incumbent)	Democratic Party			4,531	48.62
Zlatan Jovanović	Serbian Radical Party				
other candidates					
Total				9,320	100.00
