= Antun Bonifačić =

Croatian fascist politician (1901–1986)

- Born: 8 October 1901; Punat, Kingdom of Croatia-Slavonia, Austria-Hungary (now Punat, Croatia)
- Died: 24 April 1986 (aged 84); Chicago, United States

Antun Bonifačić (Croatian pronunciation: [ǎntuːn bonifǎt͡ʃit͡ɕ]; 8 October 1901 – 24 April 1986) was a Croatian Ustaša politician, professor, and writer. He served as the head of the Department of Cultural Relations for the Ministry of Foreign Affairs of the Independent State of Croatia, a fascist puppet-state of Nazi Germany.

== Biography ==
Bonifačić was born in Punat on the island of Krk on 8 October 1901. He went to gymnasium in Pazin and Sušak. In Zagreb, he studied Slavistics and the Romance languages, specializing in Croatian and French, respectively. He received his doctorate with the thesis Les éléments romantiques under the tutelage Gustave Flaubert in 1924. He then left Yugoslavia to study French literature at Sorbonne University for three years. He later returned as a teacher in Sušak, Sombor, Krk, and Zagreb, where he taught French at the University of Zagreb. During World War II, he worked as the head the Department for Cultural Relations at the Foreign Ministry of the Independent State of Croatia and served as the president of the Croatian Writers' Association. He was also a member of the European Writers' League (German: Europäische Schriftstellervereinigung), which was founded by Joseph Goebbels in 1941/42.

After the Axis powers lost, he escaped to Rome, then lived in Argentina and Brazil for sometime before immigrating to the United States in 1954. Between 1975 and 1981, he was the president of the Croatian Liberation Movement, a far-right political party founded by Ante Pavelić, the former dictator of the Independent State of Croatia.

Bonifačić died in Chicago on 24 April 1986.

== Selected works ==
- People of the West: Essays on André Gide and Henry de Montherlant (Croatian: Ljudi zapada. Eseji o André Gideu i Henry de Montherlantu, 1929)
- The Blood of Mother Earth (Croatian: Krv majke zemlje, 1935)
- Sprouts (Croatian: Mladice, 1938)
- Between Jupiter and Mars: Croatia and Europe (French: Entre Jupiter et Mars. La Croatie et l'Europe, 1944)
- You Will Be Like Gods (Croatian: Bit ćete kao bogovi, 1950)
- Let There Be Light (Croatian: Neka bude svjetlost, 1950)
- Eternal Croatia (Croatian: Vječna Hrvatska, 1953)
