= Modra lasta =

Croatian children's magazine

- Cover of issue 6, 2007-08, leading with articles about cats and Singapore
- Editor: Diana Miletić
- Categories: Children's magazine
- Frequency: Monthly (during the school year)
- Publisher: Školska knjiga
- First issue: September 1954
- Country: Croatia
- Based in: Zagreb
- Language: Croatian
- ISSN: 0352-3586

Modra lasta (English: The Blue Swallow) is a Croatian children's magazine geared for primary school students. It is published monthly by Školska knjiga.

== History ==
Modra lasta logo

The very first issue, titled Djeca za Djecu ([By] Children for Children) was published in Zagreb in 1954 by Josip Sabolović, a primary school teacher, and featured contributions by his pupils. The editor-in-chief was Blankica Veselić. The first issue had only four black-and-white pages containing a few essays, drawings and song lyrics made by pupils. Djeca za Djecu soon got very popular so the following issues included contributions by pupils from other Zagreb schools, and eventually, from schools in other cities around the country. As the project grew larger, more adults got involved in it, so the magazine needed a new name. In 1959 a readership poll was held to determine the new name and the winning suggestion was Plava lasta (The Blue Swallow) - but since there was already a newspaper called Plavi vjesnik (The Blue Gazette), it was adapted into Modra lasta (modra and plava being synonymous terms for the color blue in Croatian).

It continued to be published throughout the following decades and it achieved huge readership numbers thanks to the independent distribution network (as it is distributed directly in most primary schools), the emphasis on children's contributions, and its colorful and simple coverage of topics that closely follow the school curriculum.

== Lastan ==
Lastan is a fictional boy character that first appeared in Modra lasta in 1969. Initially he had his own column called Sastanak s Lastanom (Meeting Lastan) where he wrote about his hobbies, games, strategies for better learning, etc. At the end of the school year readers would send him their questions and he would answer them in the following issue. His column became an instant hit and turned Lastan into a well-known mascot of the magazine.

== Other features ==
=== Comic strip anthology ===
Modra lasta usually has four comics in every issue, usually appearing on the last pages of the magazine. The first comic "Vječno proljeće" published in Modra lasta was created by editor Stjepko Težak and illustrated by Hortenzije Pavić in 1958. However, Ivica Bednjanec claims that first comic published in Modra lasta is his Uskočka osveta (Uskok's revenge), made by Bednjanec but upon scenario of dr Stjepko Težak. Over the years, many other comics appeared in Modra lasta, the most famous ones being Lastan and Osmoškolci created by Ivica Bednjanec. The magazine played a very important role in popularizing comics during the 1990s and is today seen as one of the most important magazines in the history of comics in Croatia. It serialized works of other authors most notably Darko Macan (Borovnica), Goran Sudžuka (Svebor i Plamena), Krešimir Zimonić (Zlatka), Andrija Maurović, Julio Radilović, Štef Bartolić (Gluhe Laste), Neugebauer brothers and others.

Other sections appearing regularly are Lastoskop (monthly horoscope as told by Lastan), various personality tests, crosswords and famous quotations.

== Prominent contributors ==
Among the many children's contributions published over the years, some were made by people who later became prominent figures in Croatian society, such as:

- Vesna Pusić (politician)
- Jadranka Kosor (politician)
- Mira Furlan (actress)
- Božidar Alić (actor)
- Rajko Dujmić (composer)
- Željka Ogresta (journalist)
- Tanja Torbarina (columnist)
- Stjepan Čuić (author)
