= First Vrbnik Breviary =

13th/14th-century Glagolitic manuscript

- Prvi Vrbnički brevijar
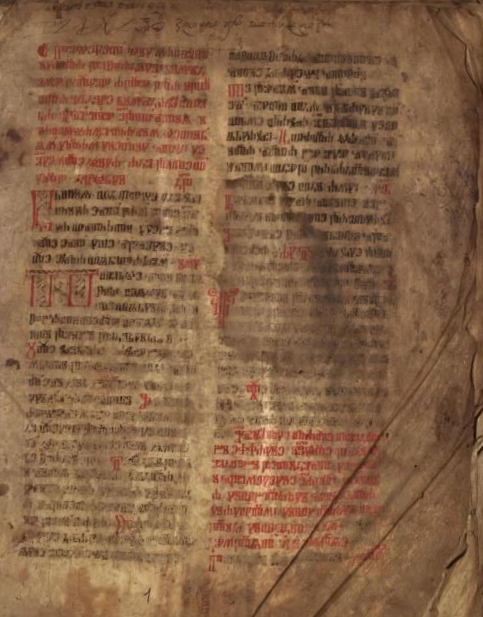
- Folio 1ab
- Size: 35.5 x 27.5 cm
- Writing: Glagolitic
- Created: 13th century
- Discovered: 1864 (by); Vrbnik
- Discovered by: Ivan Berčić
- Present location: Vrbnik parish library
- Identification: n/a
- Language: Church Slavonic

The First Vrbnik Breviary (Croatian: Prvi Vrbnički brevijar) or BrVb_{1} is a 13th/14th-century Glagolitic manuscript from Vrbnik on the island of Krk. Not counting fragments, it is the oldest surviving Glagolitic breviary.

== History ==
Originally, Ivan Berčić dated the manuscript to the 13th century. Vatroslav Jagić did not take that date for granted, but did not propose his own. Dragutin Parčić in his unpublished manuscript dated it to the middle of the 14th century. Josef Vajs examined it in greater detail, dating it to the end of the 13th or beginning of the 14th century. Josip Hamm developed a more extensive dating system, placing the First Vrbnik Breviary in the second half of the 13th century.

During the visitation of the parish by Alberto Divini Gliričić bishop of Krk in 1555, a total of 8 manuscript breviaries were recorded, and no printed breviaries; this number rose only to 9 by the time of the 1633 inventory.

The manuscript became known to science thanks to Zadar-born priest Ivan Berčić, who first published extracts from the manuscript in 1864.

The first detailed studies of the manuscript were conducted by Vajs, published in 1908. and 1910. Vinko Premuda made some further progress, published in Milčetić 1911. The most recent detailed treatment is Štefanić 1960. A microfilm had been made by the JAZU no later than 1952.

== Description ==
The manuscript is written in 2 columns of 33 rows on 261 parchment leaves of 35.5 × 27.5 cm dimension, surrounded by protective wooden boards.

The first and final folia were not originally part of the manuscript, and instead serve as protective covers, the first being a fragment from a manuscript containing a portion of Genesis, and the last being a fragment from a manuscript containing a portion of the Epistle to the Galatians.

Folia 2-260 comprise the Proprium de tempore from the Saturday before the first Sunday of Advent through the first Sunday of October. The title of the manuscript is

Ⱂ

ⰑⰝⰅⰐⰅⰕ̒ ⰝⰋⰐ̒ ⰮⰀⰕⰑⰕⰋⰐⰀⰎⰀ ⰒⰑⰈⰀⰍⰑⰐⰖ ⰓⰋⰮ̒ⰔⰍⰑⰮⰖ ⰁⰆⰐⰑⰣ ⰀⰒ͏ⰎⰖ Ⱂ͏Ⱅ͏ⰓⰀ ⰋⰒⰀⰂ͏ⰎⰀ ⰜⰓ̒ⰍⰂⰅ ⰓⰋⰮ̒ⰔⰍⰀⰃ͏Ⱁ Ⰴ͏ⰂⰑⰓⰀ, indicating it is a matutinal, though it is not a complete one (saintly feasts and psalms are missing).

== Paleography ==
In Vajs' 1908 analysis, the codex was written by 2 scribes: the main hand on ff. 2-161 and again 192–241, which Vajs believed was the older, original hand, with the more regular hand that wrote the rest being later, filling in lost sections between and after those written by the original hand. Vajs reaffirmed and elaborated on this in 1910. A detailed paleographic analysis can be found in Vajs 1910. Milčetić 1911 noted it was possible there were 3 hands rather than just.

It is the oldest complete codex from Vrbnik, and so its script exhibites less precise measured dimensions, and its strokes are not as strongly angular as those of later manuscripts. He compared it to the Acts of Paul and Thecla fragment kept at AHAZU as Fragm. glag. 4 and the Homiliary kept at NUK as Ms 368/5 (the First Ljubljana Homiliary).

Aside from the more regular Ⱜ and ', the yer occurs sporadically in two more archaic forms, and. The latter occurs about 20 times, but the former much less frequently, and only in the part written by the younger hand. Another archaism is the phonetic use of Ⰺ and Ⰹ, alone or ligated with Ⰾ or Ⰶ. The older forms are used for Ⰾ, Ⱞ, Ⰲ, Ⰴ, Ⰸ, Ⱀ, Ⱁ, and Ⱆ, especially in the upper case.

== Linguistics ==
The text of the oldest-translated scriptural portions faithfully transmits the Slavonic, but in younger translations and non-scriptural portions it is a valuable resource for the study of the evolution of the Central Chakavian dialect of Vrbnik. A detailed linguistic analysis can be found in Vajs 1910.

The yer is sometimes replaced with Ⰰ /a/ or Ⰵ /e/, reflecting the local reflex of its vocalisation, with Ⰵ /e/ coming mostly in short syllables as it does in the dialects of East Krk today; though more frequent are cases of the yer being left out altogether.

The yat is sometimes replaced with Ⰻ /i/ and sometimes with Ⰵ /e/, according to Jakubinskij's law.

The nasal Ⱔ is sometimes replaced with Ⰵ /e/, and this applies in post-palatal position as well, as is characteristic of East Krk dialects.

There are no cases of an accompanying vowel in the reflex of r̥, and there are few for the reflex of l̥, and those are only of Ⰰ /a/ rather than Ⰵ /e/.

== Text ==
A detailed content analysis can be found in Vajs 1910.

It is the only one of the Vrbnik breviaries with an intact beginning, making it an important source for the reading instructions for the Book of Isaiah. It also features portions of biblical text rarely preserved elsewhere from Genesis, Proverbs, Sirach, Job. But its scriptural readings are not as extensive as the Second Vrbnik Breviary.

The text differs from later Glagolitic breviaries in including readings not just from the Isaiah but from, for instance, Jeremiah, Joel, and Zechariah during the Advent season.

Another difference from later breviaries is the presence of historical readings in multiple nocturnes rather than just the second, sometimes extending to all nine.

Other deviations from later breviaries is the long line of psalms on the First Hour of Sunday (9 psalms with Athanasian Confessions), some of Origen's homilies on Christmas, Sunday in the Christmas octave, the Transfiguration octave, and the third and fourth Sundays after Transfiguration.

Aside from these deviations, the text of the breviary mostly matches that of the Breviarium secundum usum Romanae Curiae, but in an abbreviated form, as with the Pašman Breviary, forming a transition to the later official abbreviated form found in the Baromić Breviary and the Brozić Breviary. It is much shorter than the Breviary of Vid of Omišalj. Thus, the text includes readings from Isaiah, then Romans, I Corinthians, II Corinthians, Galatians, Genesis, Exodus, Jeremiah, Revelation, James, I Peter, II Peter, I John, II John, III John, Jude, Kings, Proverbs, Ecclesiastes, Wisdom, Sirach, Job, Judith, Maccabees, Ezekiel, Daniel, Minor Prophets.

=== Annotations ===
In addition to the main text, the breviary includes a number of marginal notes, the earliest dating to 1460. For example, on f. 190b:

1506 in the month of June. In that time the Turkish Emperor went against the Hungarian Kingdom. (Note: "·Ⱍ·Ⱇ·Ⰵ· ⰮⰋⰔⰅⰜⰀ ⰋⰣⰐⰀ · ⰂⰀ ⰕⰑ ⰂⰓⰋⰮⰅ ⰒⰓⰋⰄⰅ ⰜⰀⰓ ⰕⰖⰓⰔⰍⰋ ⰐⰀ ⰖⰃⰓⰔⰍⰑ ⰍⰓⰀⰎⰅⰂⰔⰕⰂⰑ·")

1527 in the month of June. In that time Rome was destroyed by the Spanish and there was great sorrow in Rome and throughout Christendom. And there was a famine great enough for people to die of hunger; and that year on the island of Krk there died of hunger more than 200 people and then the year following there was a still greater famine. (Note: "·Ⱍ·Ⱇ·Ⰻ·Ⰶ· ⰮⰋⰔⰅⰜⰀ ⰋⰣⰐⰀ· ⰂⰀ ⰕⰑ ⰂⰓⰋⰮⰅ ⰁⰋ ⰓⰀⰈⰑⰓⰅⰐ ⰓⰋⰮ ⰑⰄ ⰞⰒⰀⰐⰑⰎⰋ Ⰻ ⰁⰋⰞⰅ ⰂⰅⰎⰋⰍⰀ ⰕⰖⰃⰀ ̆ ⰓⰋⰮⰋ Ⰻ ⰒⰑ ⰝⰅⰮ ⰍⰓⰔⰕⰬⰡⰐⰔⰕⰂⰖ — Ⰻ ⰁⰋ ⰃⰎⰀⰄ ⰂⰅⰎⰋⰍ ⰄⰀ ⰮⰓⰀⰘⰖ ⰎⰣⰄⰋ ⰑⰄ ⰃⰎⰀⰄⰀ Ⰻ ⰒⰑⰮⰓⰋ ⰕⰑ ⰎⰅⰕⰑ Ⰲ ⰑⰕⰑⰜⰋ ⰍⰓⰖⰍⰑⰮ ⰑⰄ ⰃⰎⰀⰄⰀ ⰎⰣⰄⰋ ⰂⰅⰛⰅ ⰑⰄ ⰄⰂⰋ ⰔⰕⰑ [Ⰻ?] ⰈⰀ ⰕⰋⰮ ⰎⰅⰕⰑⰮ ⰁⰋ ⰑⰛⰅ ⰃⰎⰀⰄ·")

1547. That year there was a frost on Great Friday and it killed the buds halfway through March that had not been killed still earlier, and nowhere was anlything bound or trimmed on Jurjevo, nor nothing green. (Note: "·Ⱍ·Ⱇ·Ⰽ·Ⰶ· ⰕⰑ ⰎⰅⰕⰑ ⰁⰋ ⰔⰕⰋⰄⰬ ⰐⰀ ⰂⰅⰎⰋ ⰒⰅⰕⰀⰍⰬ Ⰻ ⰒⰑⰈⰅⰁⰑⰞⰅ ⰒⰖⰒⰋ Ⰲ ⰒⰑⰎⰋ ⰮⰀⰓⰝⰀ · Ⰰ ⰐⰅ ⰁⰋⰘⰖ ⰈⰅⰁⰀⰎⰋ ⰑⰛⰅ ⰒⰓⰋⰅ · Ⰻ ⰐⰅ ⰁⰋⰞⰅ ⰐⰋⰍⰖⰄⰀ ⰐⰋ ⰂⰅⰈⰀⰐⰑ ⰐⰋ ⰓⰋⰈⰀⰐⰑ Ⱁ ⰣⰓⰬⰅⰂⰋ ⰐⰋ ⰐⰋⰞ ⰈⰅⰎⰅⰐⰑ·")

1549 January the 8th day. On which day pop Ivan Hršić served his First Mass and it was so cold that day and morning ... that the wine froze ... that all froze what was in the chalice ... and there were 42 monks that year native to Vrbnik and they called those who were called. (Note: "·Ⱍ·Ⱇ·Ⰽ·Ⰸ· ⰅⰐⰬⰂⰓⰀ ⰄⰐⰬ ·Ⰷ· ⰍⰋ ⰄⰐ ⰔⰎⰖⰆⰋ ⰮⰎⰀⰄⰖ ⰮⰋⰔⰖ ⰒⰑⰒⰬ ⰋⰂⰀⰐⰬ ⰘⰓⰬⰞⰬⰝⰋⰛⰬ Ⰻ ⰁⰋ ⰕⰑⰎⰋⰍ ⰔⰕⰖⰄⰅⰐⰑ ⰕⰀ ⰄⰐⰬ Ⰻ ⰣⰕⰓⰋ ⰈⰀ ⰐⰋⰮⰬ ⰄⰀ ⰔⰅ ⰂⰋⰐⰑ ⰔⰮⰀⰓⰬⰈⰋⰂⰀⰞⰅ ⰄⰀ ⰒⰑⰒⰋ ⰍⰋ ⰮⰋⰔⰖ ⰔⰎⰖⰆⰀⰞⰅ ⰄⰀ ⰔⰅ ⰂⰬⰔⰅ ⰔⰬⰮⰀⰓⰬⰈⰐⰋⰞⰅ ⰝⰀ ⰁⰋⰞⰅ ⰂⰬ ⰍⰀⰎⰅⰆⰋ Ⰻ ⰐⰅ ⰮⰑⰃⰀⰞⰅ ⰔⰅ ⰕⰑⰝⰋⰕⰋ Ⰸ ⰁⰀⰝⰀⰂⰬ ⰂⰋⰐⰑ ⰄⰀ ⰔⰅ ⰁⰋⰞⰅ ⰔⰮⰀⰓⰈⰎⰑ ⰂⰬ ⰁⰀⰝⰂⰀⰘⰬ Ⰻ ⰓⰅⰄⰑⰂⰐⰋⰜⰋ ⰝⰋⰐⰀⰘⰖ ⰑⰁⰅⰄ Ⰲ ⰒⰑⰎⰀⰝⰋ ⰍⰑⰮⰖⰐⰔⰍⰑⰋ Ⰻ ⰁⰋⰞⰅ ⰓⰅⰄⰑⰂⰐⰋⰍⰋ ⰕⰑ ⰎⰅⰕⰑ ⰂⰬ ⰂⰓⰬⰂⰐⰋⰜⰋ ⰄⰑⰮⰀⰛⰋⰘⰬ ·ⰍⰁ· Ⰰ ⰈⰂⰋⰞⰅ ⰍⰋ ⰁⰋⰘⰖ Ⰸ ⰂⰀⰐⰋ Ⰻ ⰕⰅⰒⰎⰀⰘⰖ ⰂⰋⰐⰑ ⰂⰬ ⰍⰑⰕⰎⰋ ⰝⰀ ⰒⰬⰡⰘⰖ Ⰻ ⰁⰋⰞⰅ ⰮⰀⰎⰀ ⰁⰖⰓⰀ ⰄⰀ ⰁⰋⰞⰅ ⰐⰋⰍⰋ ⰐⰀⰝⰋⰐⰬ ⰑⰄⰬ ̆ⰅⰎⰋⰍⰅ ⰔⰕⰖⰄⰅⰐⰋ ⰄⰀ ⰔⰅ ⰄⰂⰋⰈⰀⰞⰅ ⰮⰑⰓⰅ ⰈⰃⰑⰓⰖ ⰂⰀ ⰀⰌⰅⰓⰬ ⰍⰀⰍⰑ ⰄⰀ ⰁⰋ ⰄⰀⰆⰬⰌⰋⰎⰑ ⰍⰀⰍⰑ ⰔⰅ ⰂⰋⰡⰞⰅ ⰐⰀⰄⰬ ⰮⰑⰓⰅⰮⰬ Ⰻ ⰈⰀ ⰕⰋⰮⰬ ⰍⰀⰄⰀ ⰁⰋ ⰂⰓⰋⰮⰅ ⰂⰔⰅ ⰔⰮⰑⰍⰂⰋ ⰔⰕⰖⰒⰋ ⰒⰑⰔⰀⰘⰬⰐⰖⰞⰅ Ⰲ ⰑⰕⰑⰜⰋ Ⰻ ⰑⰍⰑⰎⰑ ⰂⰓⰬⰁⰐⰋⰍⰀ Ⰻ ⰖⰎⰋⰍⰋ ⰄⰀ ⰔⰅ ⰐⰅ ⰮⰑⰓⰅ ⰐⰋⰍⰀⰄⰋⰓⰅ ⰐⰀⰋⰕⰋ ⰐⰋⰅⰄⰬⰐⰑ ⰄⰓⰋⰂⰑ ⰐⰋ ⰔⰮⰑⰍⰬⰂⰅ ⰐⰋ ⰖⰎⰋⰍⰋ ⰈⰅⰎⰅⰐⰑ Ⰻ ⰒⰑⰈⰅⰐⰖⰞⰅ ⰆⰋⰕⰀ ⰍⰅ ⰁⰋⰬⰖ ⰔⰋⰡⰐⰋ ⰄⰑ ⰕⰑⰃⰀ ⰂⰓⰋⰮⰅⰐⰀ ⰐⰀⰂⰎⰀⰔⰕⰋⰕⰑ ⰡⰓⰜⰋ ⰂⰬⰔⰅ ⰒⰞⰅⰐⰋⰜⰅ Ⰻ ⰓⰀⰆⰅ ⰐⰋⰍⰖⰄⰀ ⰍⰀⰄⰋ ⰁⰋⰞⰅ ⰡⰕⰬⰐⰑ ⰕⰀ ⰐⰅ ⰒⰑⰃⰋⰐⰖ ⰈⰀⰕⰋⰮⰬ ⰀⰒⰓⰋⰎⰀ ⰄⰐ ·ⰂⰉ· ⰒⰀⰄⰅ ⰂⰅⰎⰋⰍⰬ ⰔⰐⰋⰃ ⰂⰋⰐⰑⰄⰑⰎⰋ Ⰻ ⰐⰀ ⰘⰎⰀⰮⰖ Ⰻ ⰐⰀ ⰑⰁⰋⰄⰋⰐⰋ Ⰻ ⰐⰐⰀ ⰄⰐⰬ ·ⰃⰉ· ⰑⰁⰬⰐⰑⰛⰬ ⰒⰀⰄⰅ ⰁⰀⰓⰞⰋⰐⰀ Ⰻ ⰁⰋ ⰞⰍⰑⰄⰀ ⰑⰄⰬ ⰕⰓⰬⰔⰡ ⰈⰀⰝⰬ ⰁⰋⰞⰅ ⰈⰅⰎⰅⰐⰑ Ⰻ ⰀⰍⰑ ⰁⰋ ⰂⰅⰄⰓⰑ ⰂⰔⰅ ⰁⰋ ⰒⰑⰮⰑⰓⰋⰎⰑ Ⰻ ⰁⰋ ⰮⰓⰀⰈⰬ ⰕⰖ ⰐⰑⰛⰬ Ⰻ Ⰲ ⰍⰖⰐⰕⰓⰀⰄⰋ ⰂⰓⰬⰁⰀⰐⰬⰔⰍⰑⰋ ⰂⰅⰛⰅ ⰮⰅⰔⰕⰋⰘⰬ ⰝⰀ ⰔⰅ ⰮⰑⰓⰅ ⰓⰅⰛⰋ ⰂⰀⰔⰬ ⰍⰖⰐⰗⰋⰐⰬ ⰂⰓⰬⰁⰀⰐⰬⰔⰍⰋ")

== Selected works ==
Nejstarší breviář charvatsko-hlaholský

- Štefanić, Vjekoslav (1960). Glagoljski rukopisi otoka Krka [Glagolitic Manuscripts of the Island of Krk] (in Croatian). Zagreb: Croatian Academy of Sciences and Arts.
- Tentor, Mate (1913). "Najstariji hrvatski glagolski brevijar" [The Oldest Croatian Glagolitic Breviary]. Vjesnik Staroslavenske akademije u Krku (in Serbo-Croatian). 2 (published 1914): 33–42.
- Milčetić, Ivan (1911). "I. Vrbnički brevijar" [I. Vrbnik Breviary]. Hrvatska glagoļska bibliografija [Croatian Glagolitic Bibliography] (in Croatian). Vol. I. Zagreb: Arhiv HAZU. pp. 53–55.
- Vajs, Josef (1910-10-05). Nejstarší breviář charvatsko-hlaholský [The Oldest Croato-Glagolitic Breviary] (in Czech). Prague: Česka společnost náuk.
- Vajs, Josef (1908). "Hlaholské kodexy ve Vrbníku" [Glagolitic Codices in Vrbnik]. Časopis Musea království Českého. 82 (1): 66–72. ISSN 1210-9746.

== See also ==
- Angular Glagolitic
- List of Glagolitic manuscripts (1200–1399)
- Lists of Glagolitic manuscripts
