= Risika =

- Village
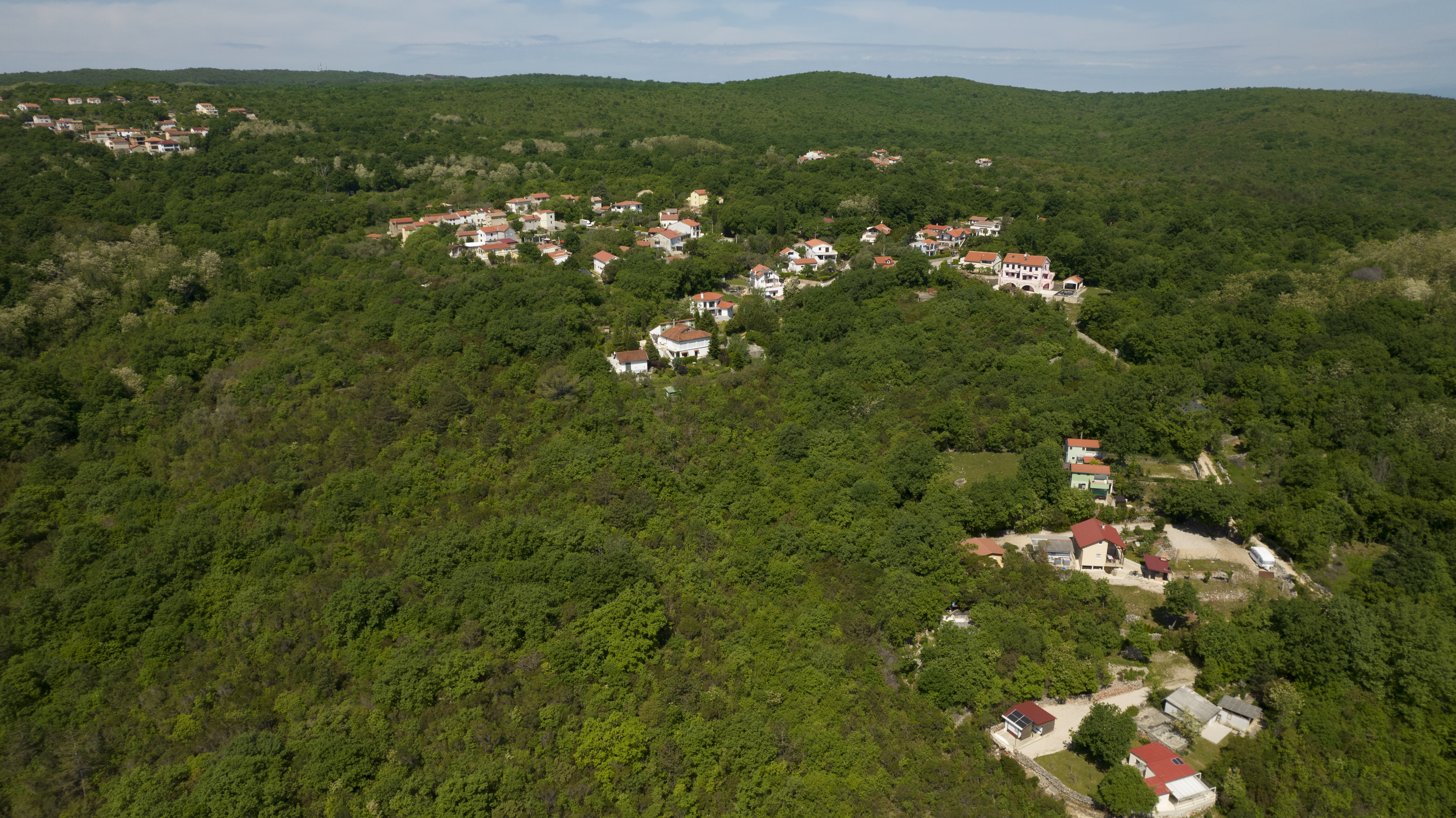
- View of Risika

- Location within Krk Location within Croatia
- Coordinates: 45.10494°N 14.64681°E
- Country: Croatia
- County: Primorje-Gorski Kotar
- Municipality: Vrbnik

Area
  - Total: 11.3 km^{2} (4.4 sq mi)

Population (2021)
  - Total: 154
  - Density: 13.6/km^{2} (35.3/sq mi)
- Time zone: UTC+1 (CET)
  - Summer (DST): UTC+2 (CEST)

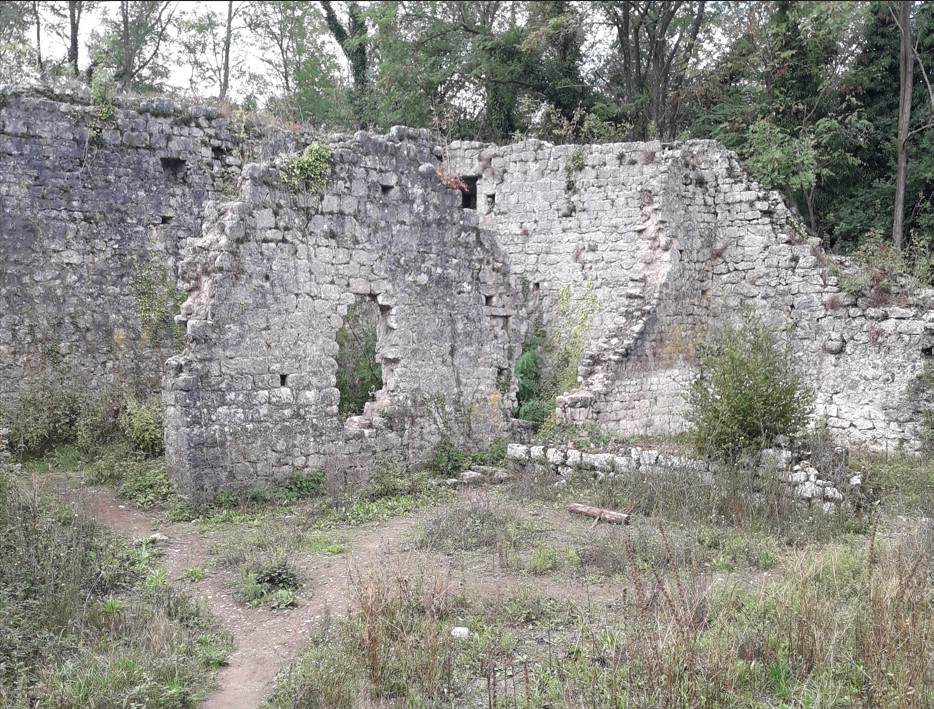
Ruins of the Gradec Castle near Risika

Risika is a village on the eastern side of the Croatian island of Krk. It is part of the municipality of Vrbnik. As of 2021, it had 154 inhabitants. The ruins of an old Frankopan castle, Gradec Castle (Croatian: Kaštel Gradec), are to be found just to the southwest of the village.

== Religion ==
Its Catholic parish was founded in 1933, and its parish church was built in 1861. In 1939, its parish had 916 souls, plus 120 outside the country.

List of parish priests of Risika:

- Andrija Juranić (b. Dubašnica 1872-03-12, primiz Krk 1896)

== Governance ==
=== Local ===
It is the seat of its own local committee.

== Bibliography ==
- Draganović, Krunoslav (1939-04-20). Opći šematizam Katoličke crkve u Jugoslaviji. Sarajevo: Akademija "Regina Apostolorum".
