= Garica =

- Village
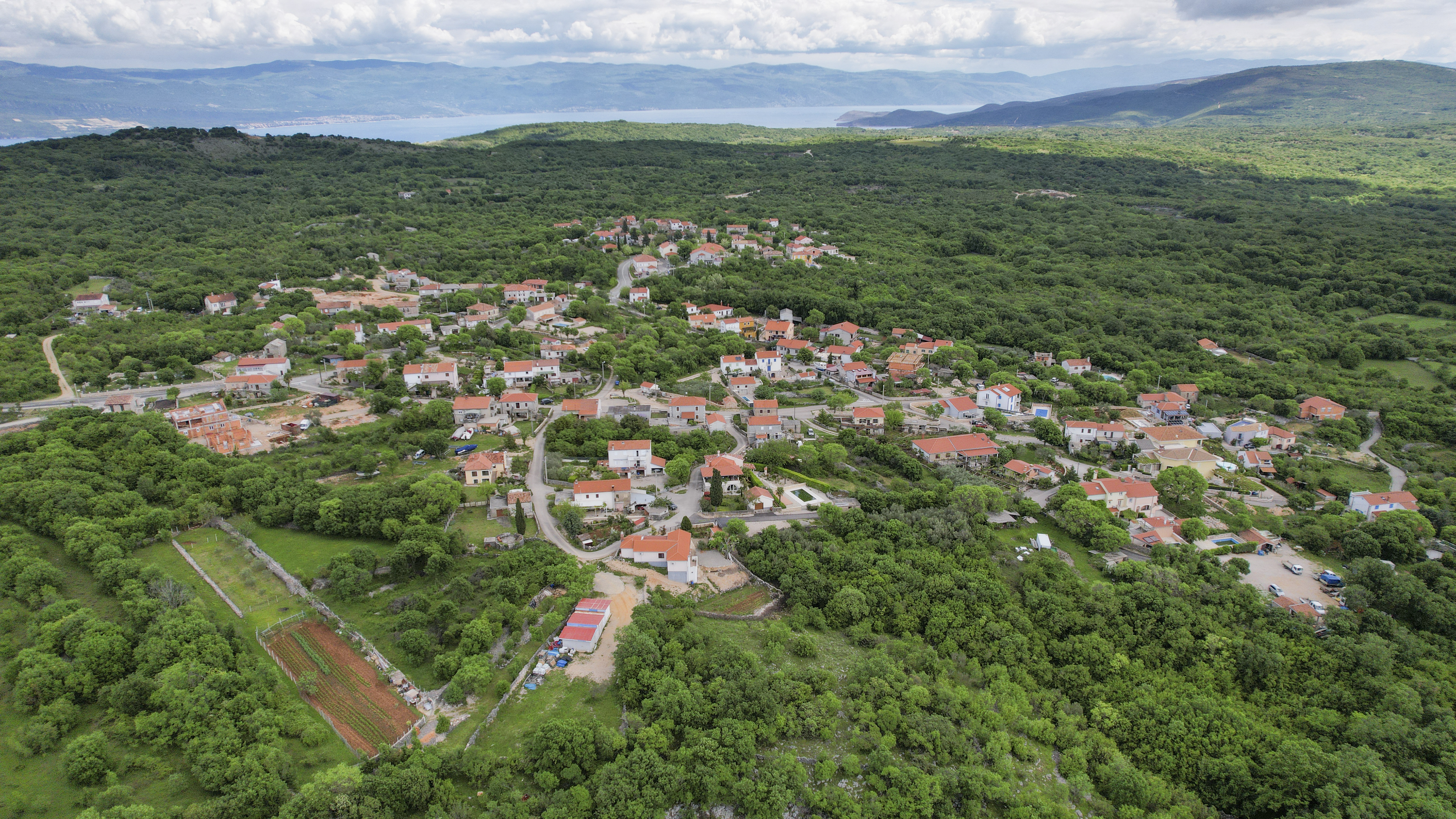
- View of Garica

- Location within Krk Location within Croatia
- Coordinates: 45.08772°N 14.61365°E
- Country: Croatia
- County: Primorje-Gorski Kotar
- Municipality: Vrbnik

Area
  - Total: 6.5 km^{2} (2.5 sq mi)

Population (2021)
  - Total: 138
  - Density: 21/km^{2} (55/sq mi)
- Time zone: UTC+1 (CET)
  - Summer (DST): UTC+2 (CEST)

Garica is a small village located on the middle of the Croatian island of Krk. It is part of the municipality of Vrbnik. As of 2021, Garica had 138 inhabitants. To the west of Garica is a stone quarry.

== Religion ==
Its chaplaincy church was built in 1871, and in 1923 it was removed from Vrbnik's parish administration and made an independent chaplaincy, directly under the Vrbnik deaconate. In 1939, its parish had 784 souls.

List of chaplains of Garica:

- Dragutin Hlača (b. Grobnik 1872-12-26, primiz Sušak 1900-10-14)

== Governance ==
=== Local ===
It is the seat of the Local Committee of Garica, encompassing itself and Kampelje.

== Bibliography ==
- Draganović, Krunoslav (1939-04-20). Opći šematizam Katoličke crkve u Jugoslaviji. Sarajevo: Akademija "Regina Apostolorum".
