= Enver Čolaković =

Bosnian, writer (1913-1976)

- Born: 27 May 1913; Budapest, Kingdom of Hungary, Austria-Hungary
- Died: 18 August 1976 (aged 63); Zagreb, SR Croatia, SFR Yugoslavia
- Resting place: Mirogoj cemetery, Zagreb, Croatia
- Education: University of Belgrade University of Zagreb
- Occupations: Writer, translator
- Spouse: Stella Čolaković (m. 1947, posthumous year 1988)
- Children: Esad Čolaković (1970-); Zlatan Čolaković (1955-2008)
- Writing career
- Language: Serbo-Croatian, German and Hungarian
- Period: Postmodern
- Genres: Poetry, novels
- Notable work: The Legend of Ali Pasha
- Notable awards: Matica hrvatska (1943)
- Website: www.envercolakovic.com

Enver Čolaković (Cyrillic: Енвер Чолаковић; 27 May 1913 – 18 August 1976) was a Bosnian, Croatian and Hungarian writer and translator, best known for his 1944 novel The Legend of Ali Pasha. During the later stages of World War II, he served as a cultural attaché to the Independent State of Croatia embassy in Budapest. After the war, he spent the rest of his life in Zagreb, where he published several literary translations from Hungarian and German.

== Biography ==
Enver Čolaković in his youth.

Born in Budapest in 1913 to Bosnian Muslim father Vejsil-beg Čolaković and Hungarian mother Ilona (Fatima-Zehra) (née Mednyánszki), Čolaković spent his childhood traveling around the region, and after World War I he settled in Sarajevo. He studied physics and mathematics in Budapest and history in Zagreb. Between 1931 and 1939, Čolaković wrote in the Hungarian and German languages. Between 1939 and 1941, his works were published by a number of magazines based in Sarajevo and Zagreb, such as Osvit (Dawn), Hrvatski misao (The Croatian Thought), Hrvatski narod (The Croatian People), Hrvatsko kolo (The Croatian Circuit) and Novi behar (The New Blossom). Čolaković also wrote a series of essays and reviews in which he advocated rights for Bosnian Muslims. His comedy Moja žena krpi čarape was performed at the Sarajevo National Theatre in 1943 and later at the Banja Luka Theatre in 1944.

It's worth dedicating your entire life to Bosnia.

— Enver Čolaković

I began writing The Legend of Ali Pasha with a specific purpose - to preserve our Bosnian language. Not the language of denominations or peoples of Bosnia, but the language of Bosnia. I also wanted to re-create a historical period of Bosnia.

— Enver Čolaković

His novel The Legend of Ali Pasha (1944) was awarded Matica hrvatska (Matrix Croatica) Award. By the end of World War II, he was a recognized and well-known writer, written about by prominent critics such as Julije Benešić, Tom Smerdel, Ljubomir Maraković and Petar Grgec. They note the different linguistic substrates of his language – the Turkish, Greek, Spanish and Croatian lexicon. However, Čolaković's sound knowledge of Bosnia's Muslim, Catholic, Jewish and Orthodox communities is also evident.

In 1944, he was appointed cultural attaché at the embassy of the Axis-allied Independent State of Croatia in Budapest. After World War II he was arrested in Sarajevo, detained in Zagreb, and eventually released. By the decision of the new authorities, he was forbidden to publish his literary works and their translations for two decades. In a 1971 interview, Čolaković stated: "I began writing The Legend of Ali Pasha with a specific purpose - to preserve our Bosnian language. Not the language of denominations or peoples of Bosnia, but the language of Bosnia. I also wanted to re-create a historical period of Bosnia."

He later worked as an editor at the Publishing Institute of Croatia until 1946. Between 1952 and 1954, he was an editor at the Croatian Lexicographical Institute. Since he could not publish original works, he translated literary works from other languages. He translated Hungarian, Austrian and Hebrew poetry. For his enormous body of translations of Hungarian and Austrian authors, he was awarded the Hungarian Petőfi Award and the Austrian Decoration for Science and Art in 1970. He translated the novels of Ervin Šinko and Gyula Illyés, Zoltán Kodály's oratorio Psalmus Hungaricus and Richard Wagner's opera Die Meistersinger von Nürnberg. Together with his wife Stella Čolaković, he also created many classical music programs for radio broadcast.

Čolaković was member of Matica hrvatska, Croatian Writers' Association, the Association of Literary Translators and the Yugoslav branch of the International PEN. He was among writers who signed the Declaration on the Name and Status of the Croatian Literary Language. In 1968, he was one of the founders and members of the editorial board of the literary magazines Marulić and Hrvatski književni list (Croatian literary magazine).

Enver Čolaković died in Zagreb on 18 August 1976 of a heart attack at the age of 63. A square and park in Zagreb and a street in Sarajevo, and several schools in Bosnia and Herzegovina are named after him. In 1970, Čolaković was awarded the Austrian Cross of Honour for Science and Art, 1st class

== Works ==
=== Author ===
- Legenda o Ali-paši, novel (Zagreb 1944, 1970, 1989; Sarajevo 1991, 1997, 1998, 2022)
- Izabrane pjesme, poems (Zagreb 1990)
- Lokljani. Iz Bosne o Bosni, short stories (Zagreb 1991)
- Mali svijet: roman iz naše nedavne prošlosti, novel (Zagreb 1991; Sarajevo 2026)
- Bosni, poems (Zagreb 1998)
- Jedinac: roman u stihovima, novel in verse (Zagreb 2001; Sarajevo 2024)
- Knjiga majci, novel (Zagreb, 2013; Sarajevo, 2023)
- Melun, novel (Sarajevo 2023)
- Spirale, novel (Sarajevo 2025)

=== Drama ===
- Moja žena krpi čarape, comedy, 1943.

=== Translations ===
- Gyula Illyés, poems (Zagreb 1971)
- Zoltán Csuka, Moje dvije domovine, (Sarajevo 1972)
- Zoltán Csuka, poems (Zagreb 1975)
- Zlatna knjiga mađarske poezije, poems (Zagreb 1978)

== Awards ==
- 1943 Matica hrvatska for the novel The Legend of Ali-Pasha
- 1970 Petőfi Award for translations of Hungarian works
- 1970 Austrian Decoration for Science and Art for translations of Austrian works
