= Kampelje =

Kampelje Kanpeje
- Village
- Location within Krk Location within Croatia
- Coordinates: 45.06691°N 14.61734°E
- Country: Croatia
- County: Primorje-Gorski Kotar
- Municipality: Vrbnik

Area
  - Total: 5.0 km^{2} (1.9 sq mi)

Population (2021)
  - Total: 11
  - Density: 2.2/km^{2} (5.7/sq mi)
- Time zone: UTC+1 (CET)
  - Summer (DST): UTC+2 (CEST)

Kampelje (Chakavian: Kanpeje) is a small village on the middle of the Croatian island of Krk. It is part of the municipality of Vrbnik. As of 2021, it had 11 inhabitants. The village is located 3 km to the south of Garica.
