= Stara Baška =

- Village
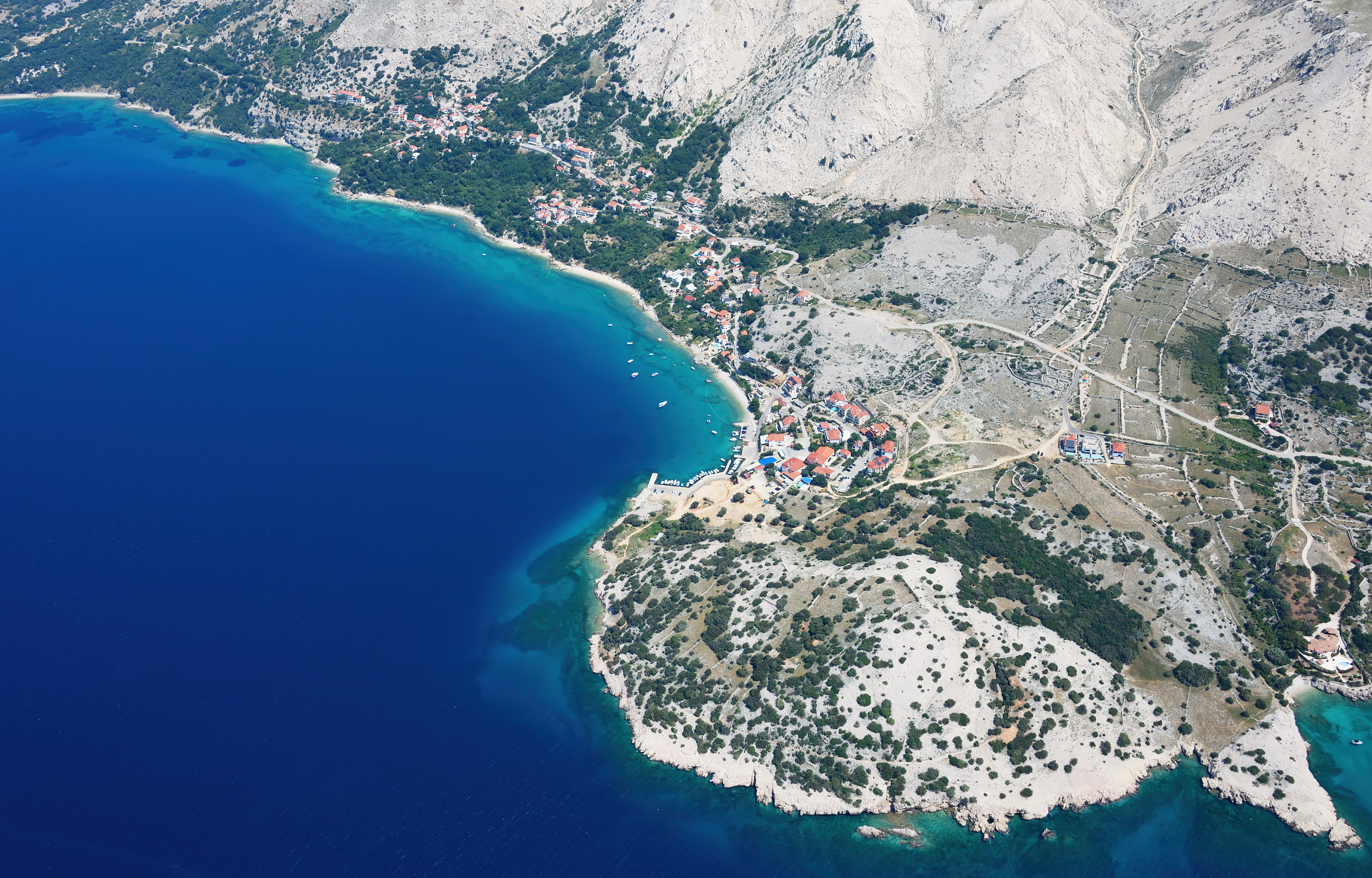
- Stara Baška
- Interactive map of Stara Baška
- Country: Croatia
- Region: Croatian Littoral
- County: Primorje-Gorski Kotar County
- Municipality: Punat

Area
  - Total: 13.4 km^{2} (5.2 sq mi)
- Elevation: 12 m (39 ft)

Population (2021)
  - Total: 116
  - Density: 8.66/km^{2} (22.4/sq mi)
- Time zone: UTC+1 (CET)
  - Summer (DST): UTC+2 (CEST)
- Postal code: 51521 Punat
- Area code: 051
- Vehicle registration: RI

Stara Baška is a village located on the island of Krk in Croatia.

== Governance ==
=== Local ===
It is the seat of its own local committee.

== Religion ==
Its Catholic parish was founded in 1808, and its parish church was built in 1847. In 1939, its parish had 412 souls, plus 30 outside the country.

List of parish priests of Stara Baška:

- Nikola Barac (b. Jurandvor 1907-05-19, primiz Krk 1933-04-04)

== Bibliography ==
- Draganović, Krunoslav (1939-04-20). Opći šematizam Katoličke crkve u Jugoslaviji. Sarajevo: Akademija "Regina Apostolorum".
