= Vrbnik =

- Municipality
- Municipality of Vrbnik; Općina Vrbnik
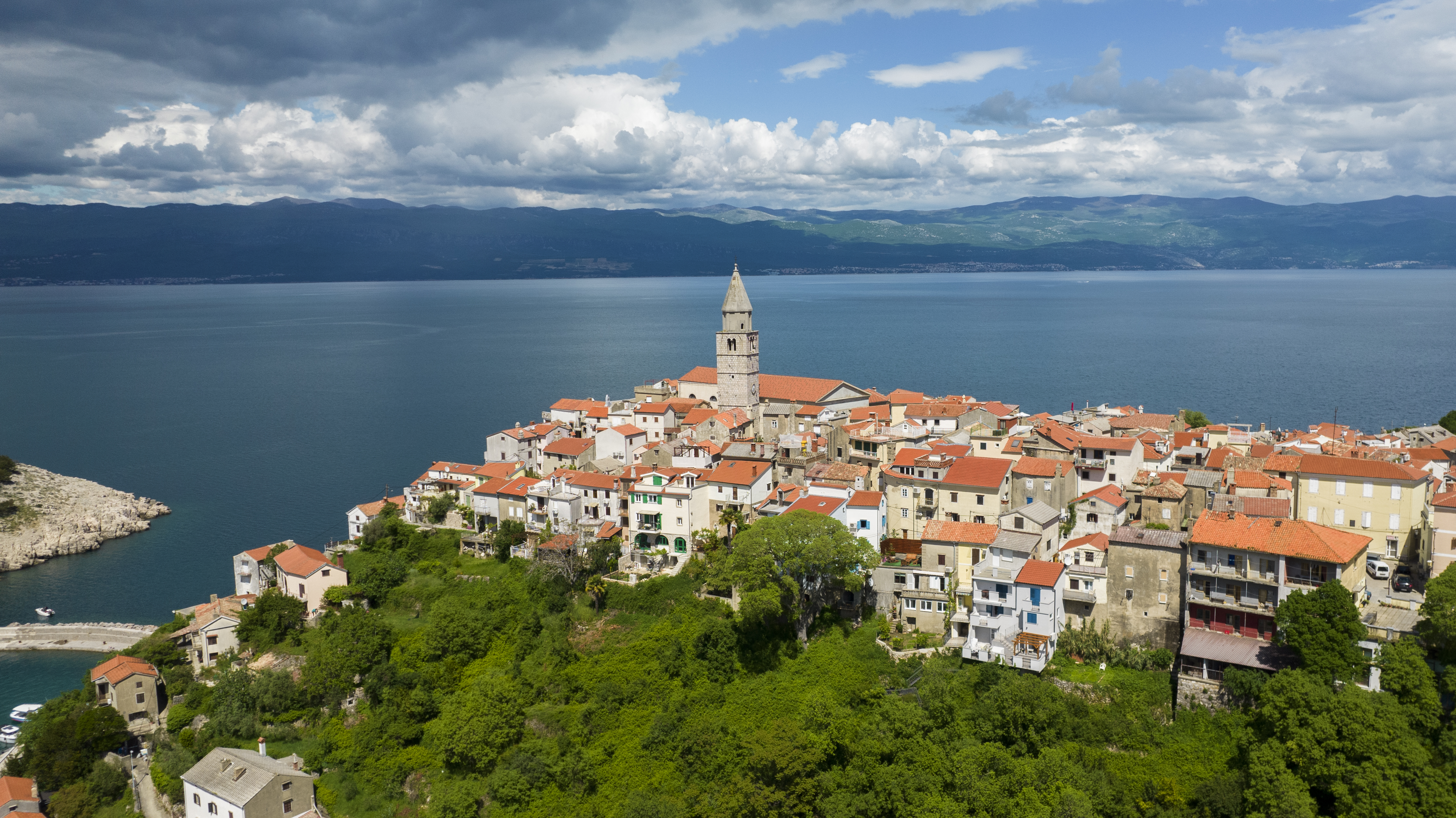

- Location of Vrbnik within Croatia
- Coordinates: 45°05′N 14°40′E
- Country: Croatia
- County: Primorje-Gorski Kotar County

Government
  - Mayor: Marija Dujmović Pavan

Area
  - Municipality: 52.6 km^{2} (20.3 sq mi)
  - Urban: 29.8 km^{2} (11.5 sq mi)
- Elevation: 49 m (161 ft)

Population (2021)
  - Municipality: 1,190
  - Density: 22.6/km^{2} (58.6/sq mi)
  - Urban: 887
  - Urban density: 29.8/km^{2} (77.1/sq mi)
- Time zone: UTC+1 (CET)
  - Summer (DST): UTC+2 (CEST)
- Postal code: 51516
- Area code: 051
- Website: opcina-vrbnik.hr

Vrbnik is a village and a municipality on the east coast of the island of Krk. The village is perched on a limestone outcropping 50 m above the Adriatic Sea.

Vrbnik is naturally separated from mainland Croatia by the Vinodol Channel, where the towns of Crikvenica and Novi Vinodolski can be observed across the sea. Since 1980 the island has been connected to mainland Croatia via the Krk Bridge.

Vrbnik has a long history of 900 years, it was an important Frankopan castle, and a Glagolitic and religious center.

Originally a walled town, Vrbnik was established in medieval times. According to the 2021 census, the settlement of Vrbnik itself has a population of 887 with a total of 1,190 people in the municipality, which includes three other nearby settlements; Garica with 138 inhabitants, Kampelje with 11 inhabitants and Risika with 154 inhabitants.

== Culture ==
The Vrbnik Statute (Croatian: Vrbnički statut) was written in 1388 and confirms the status of Vrbnik as an administrative and political center. The town is also known through the folk song "Verbniče nad moren" or Verbniče nad moru" (Oh Vrbnik over the Sea), sung as far away as White Carniola in Slovenia.

Places of cultural significance include the Vitezić library, the Gothic Chapel of the Rosary and the Chapel of St. John in the Parish Church of the Assumption, and a collection of ancient manuscripts and Glagolitic manuscripts housed at the parish church.

Vrbnik is known for its indigenous varietal of white wine called Žlahtina.

Vrbnik also claims to contain the world's narrowest street — Ulica Klančić is about 40–50 cm (1.3–1.6 ft) wide.

Glagolitic manuscripts by notary Anton Petriš of Vrbnik:

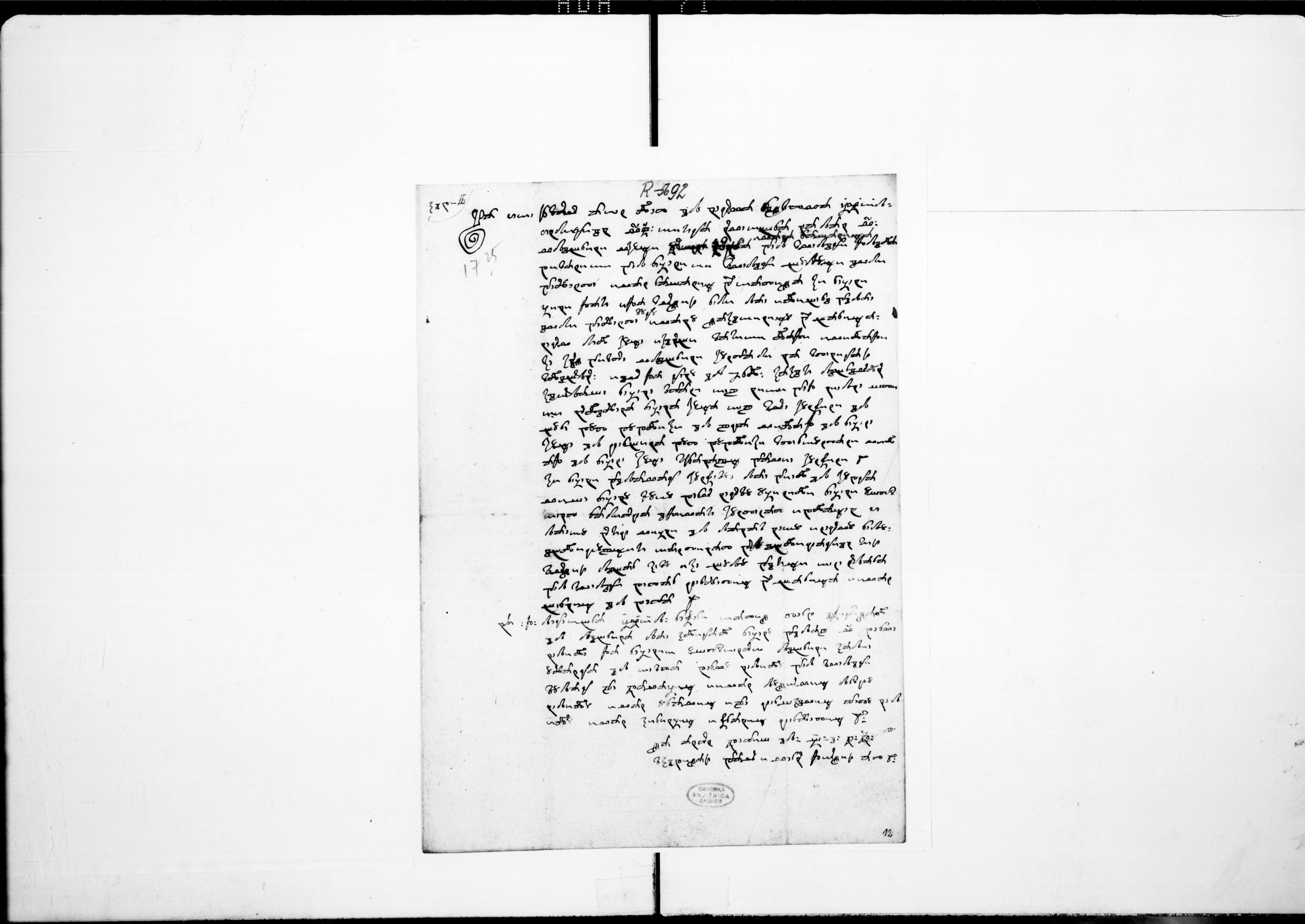
Deed of purchase dated 1725-11-03

Deed of purchase dated 1733-11-08

Deed of purchase dated 1750-01-11

Deed of purchase dated 1751-03-14

Deed of purchase dated 1755-12-28

== Religion ==
Its Catholic parish was first mentioned in 1472, and its parish church was built in 1450. In 1939, its parish had 2628 souls, plus 406 outside the country; it was the seat of a deaconate encompassing the parishes Vrbnik, Baška, Draga Bašćanska, Garica (independent chaplaincy), Risika and Stara Baška.

List of parish priests of Vrbnik:

- Ivan Gršković (b. Vrbnik 1883-12-02, primiz Vrbnik 1906-07-23)
  - Chaplain Nikola Ilijić (b. Omišalj 1913-06-25, primiz Krk 1907-06-29)

== Governance ==
It is the seat of its own local committee.

== Notable residents ==
- Blaž Baromić — Parish priest and Glagolitic scribe
- Josip Bozanić — Archbishop of Zagreb, Cardinal-Priest of Saint Jerome of the Croats
- Ivan Feretić — historian
- Zlatko Sudac — Roman Catholic Priest, known for his Stigmata

== Photo gallery ==
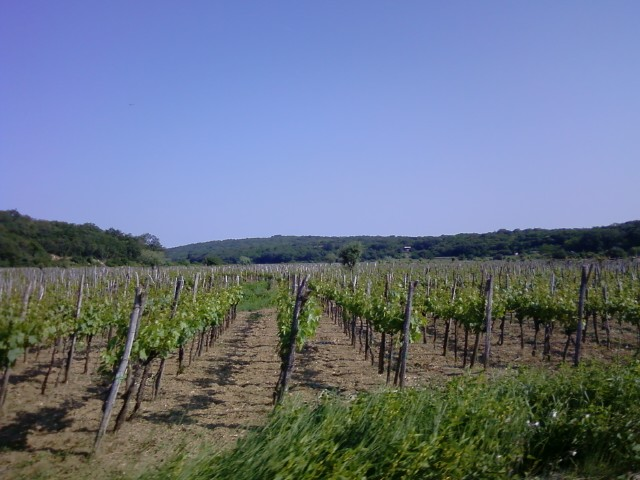
Vineyards

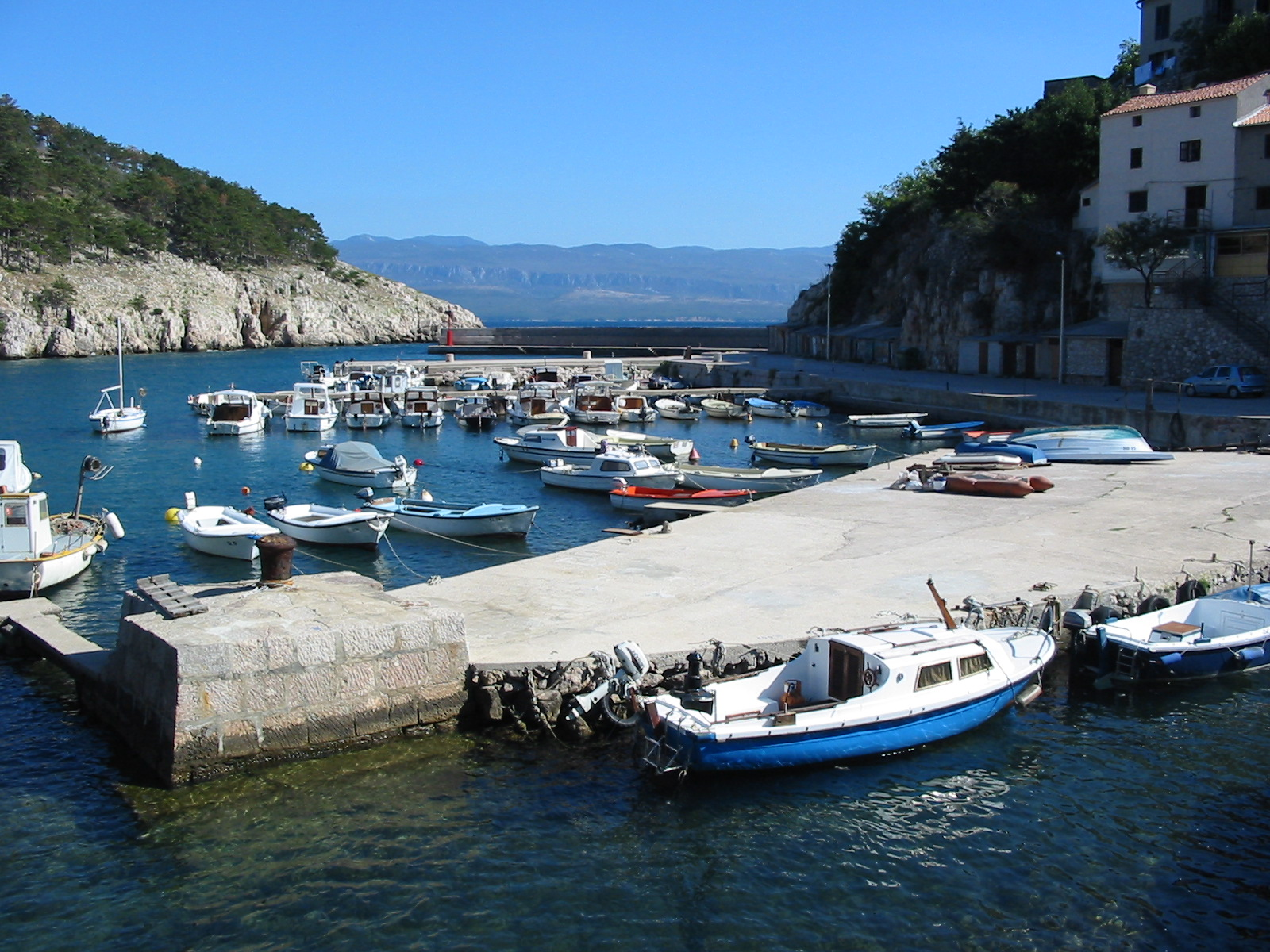
Harbour

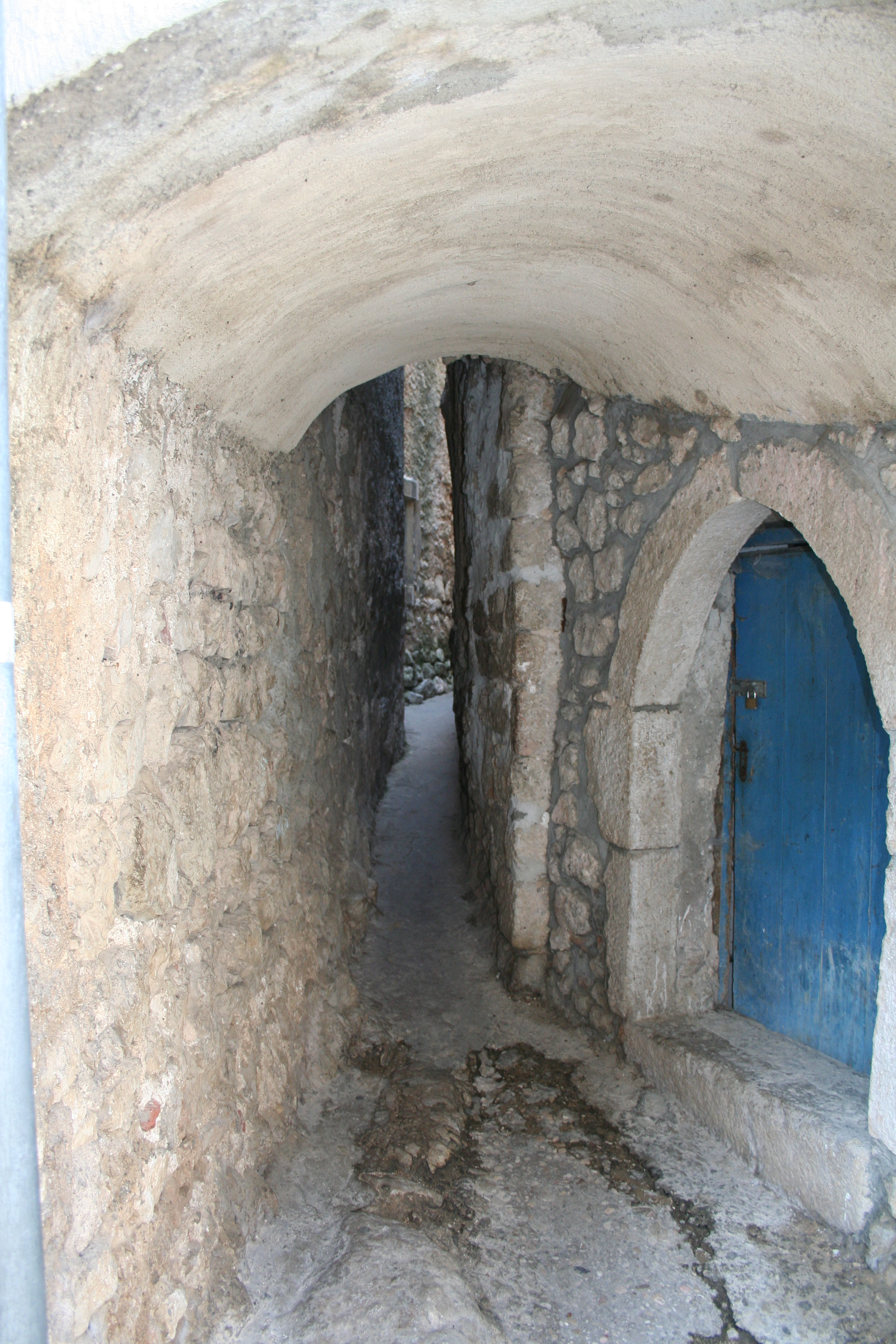
Klančić - one of the narrowest streets in the world, 40 cm (16 in)
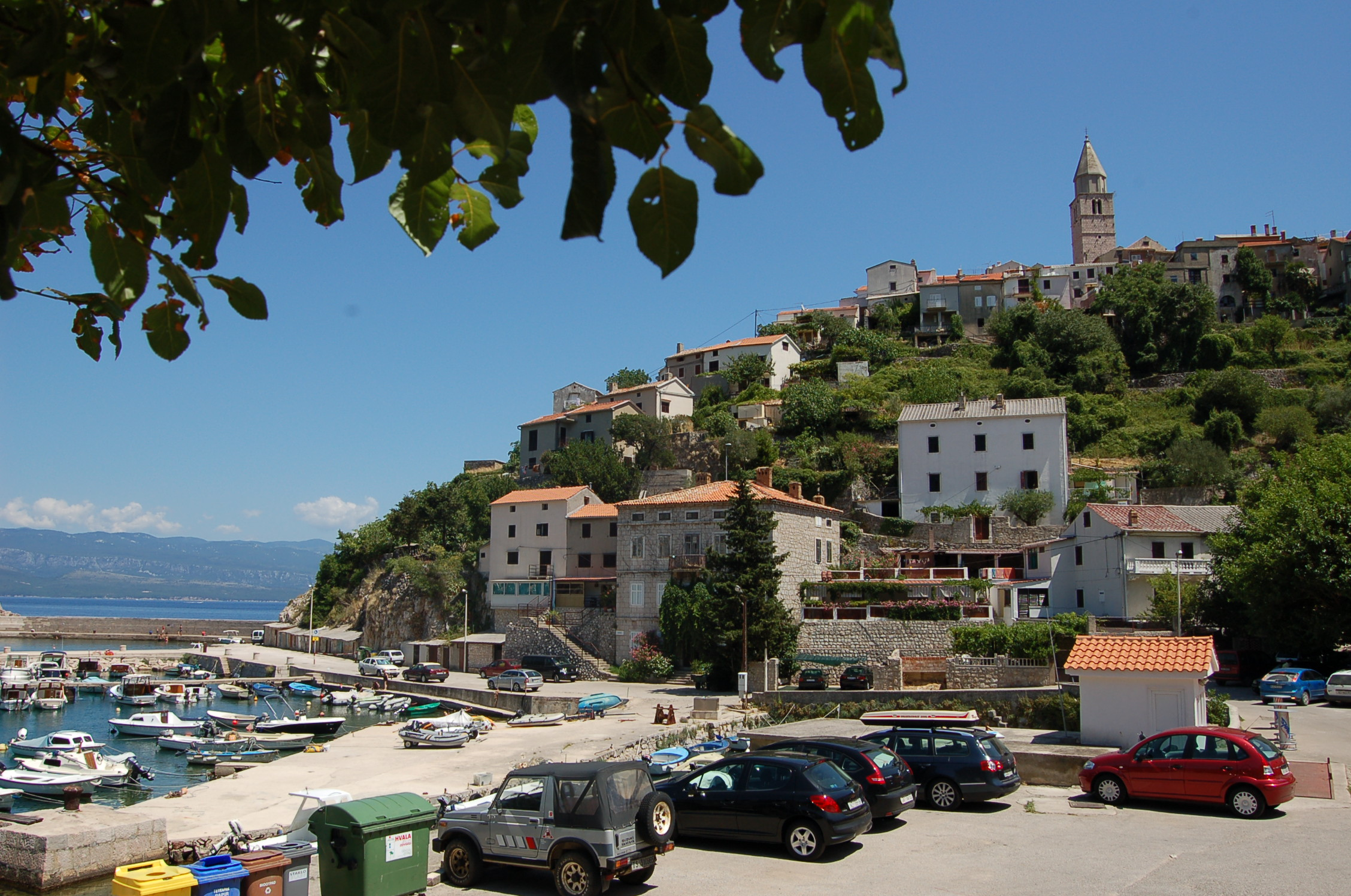
View from the harbour

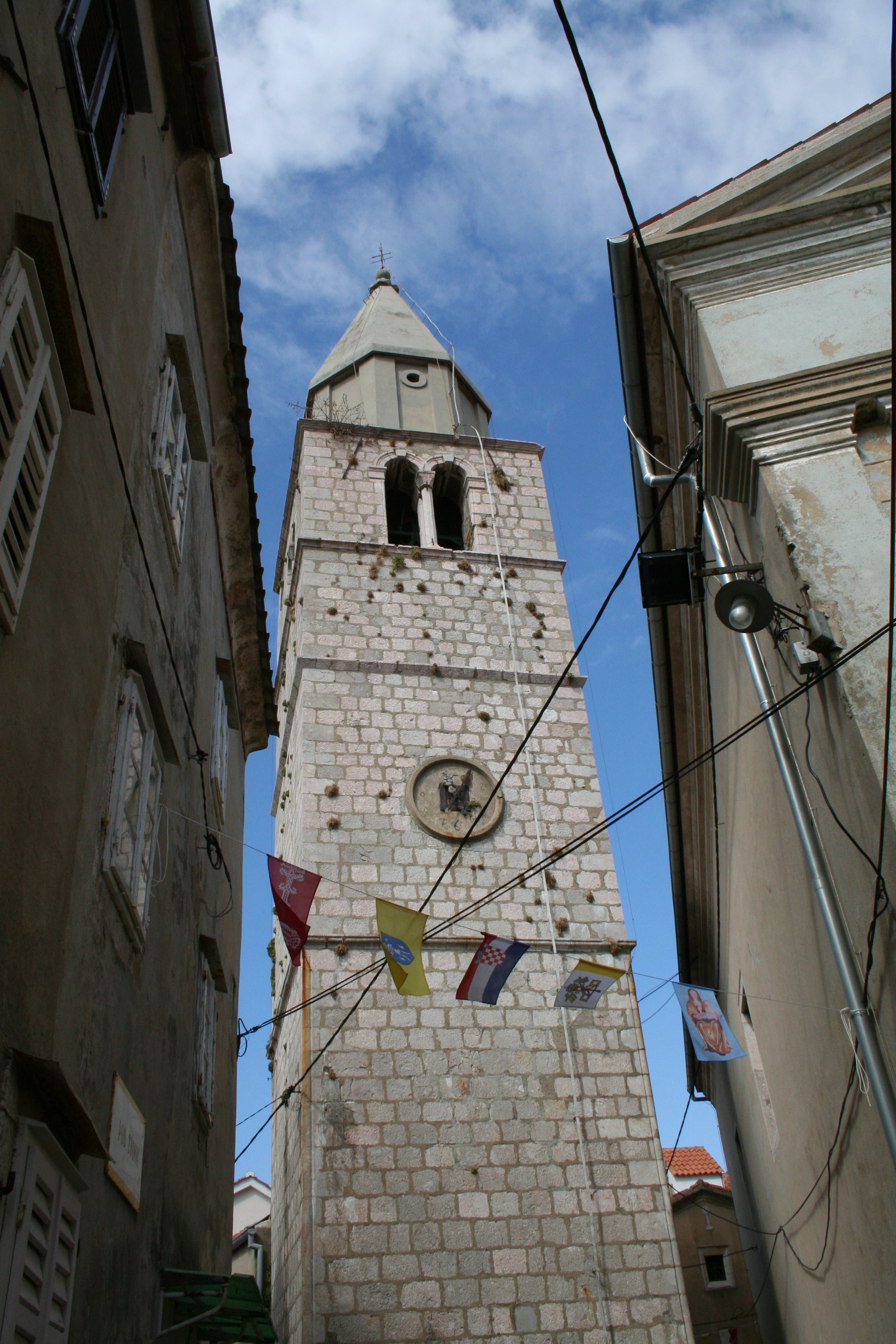
Bell Tower of the Church of the Assumption of Mary

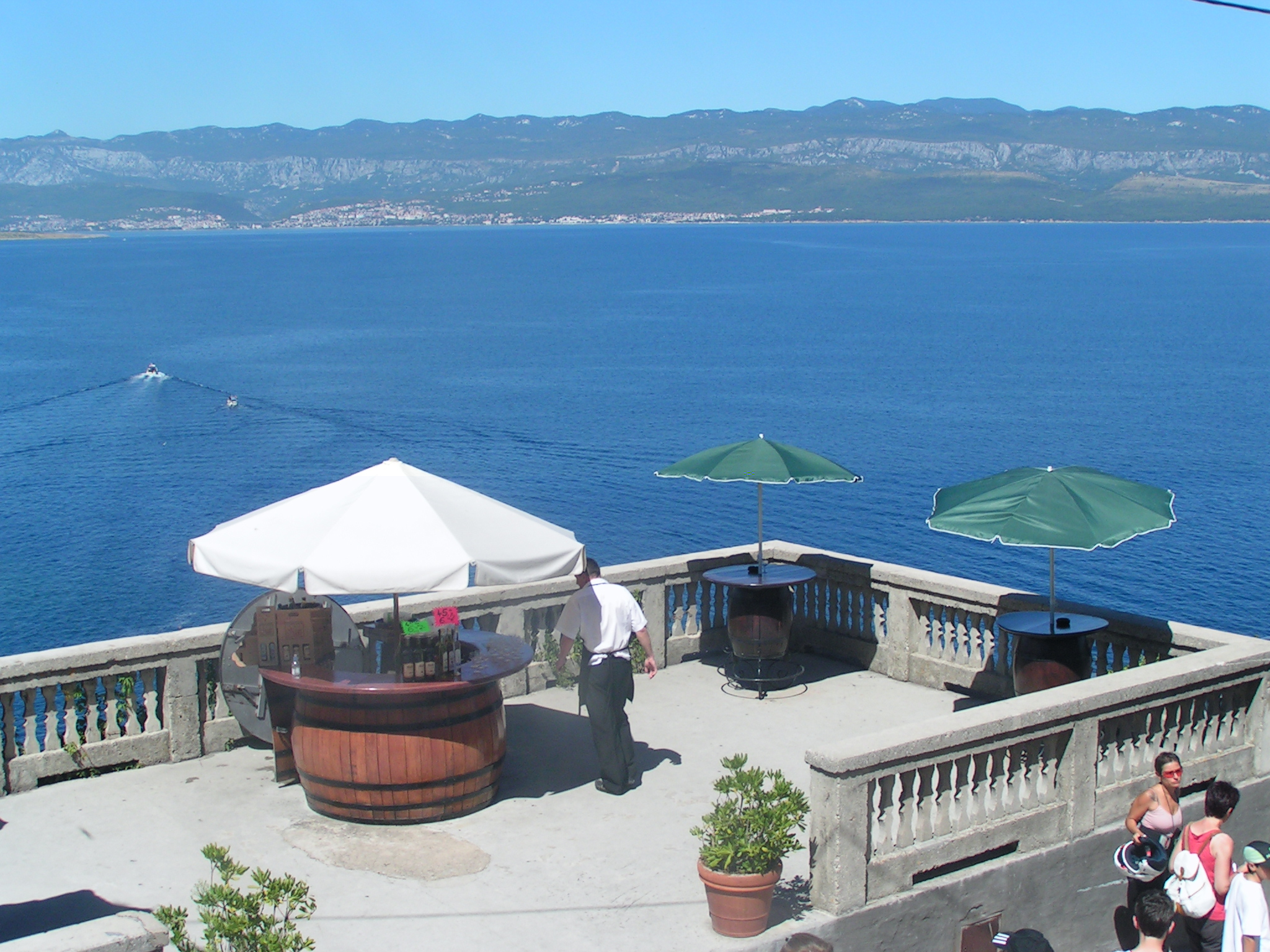
View over channel to Crikvenica
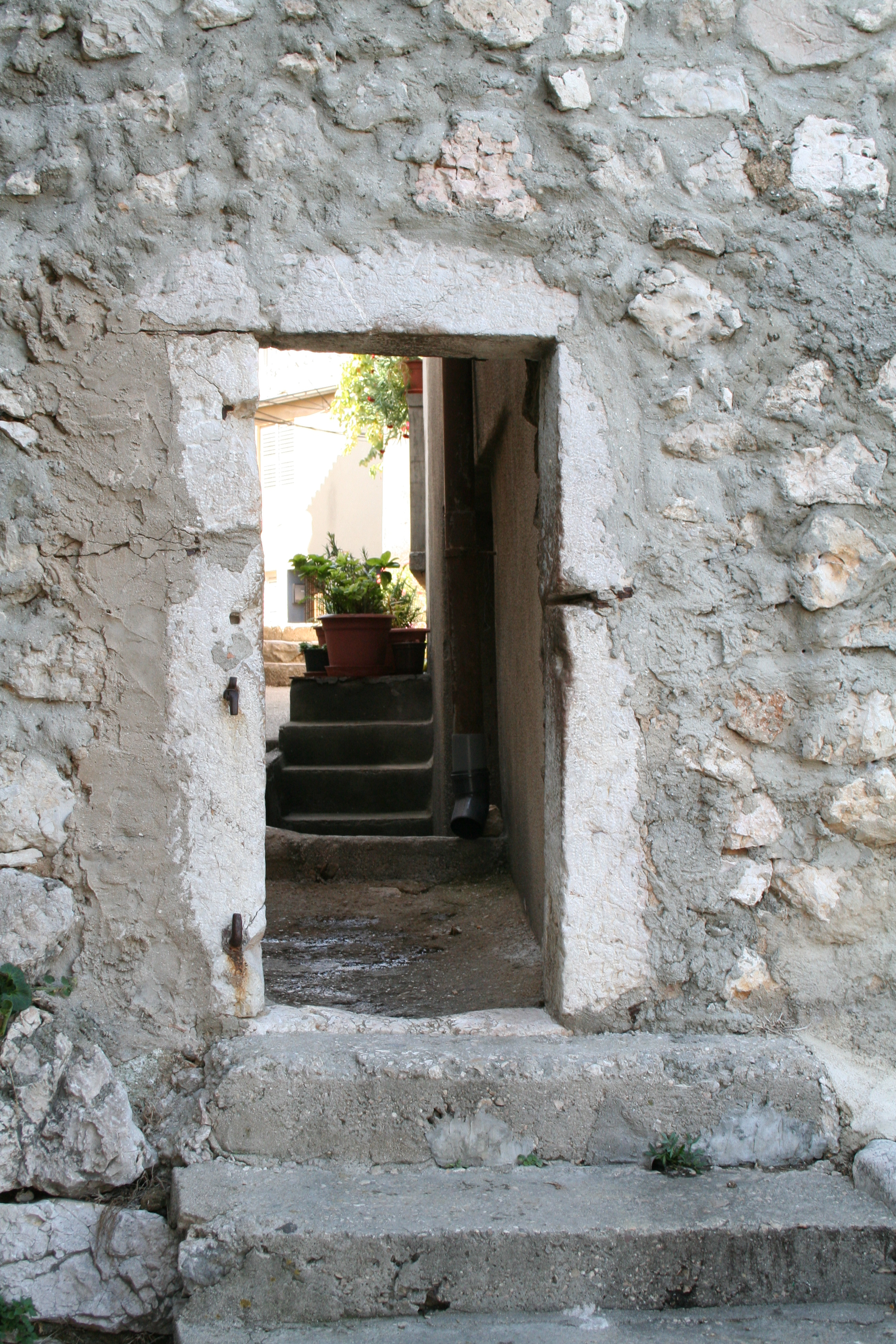
Gate in the wall

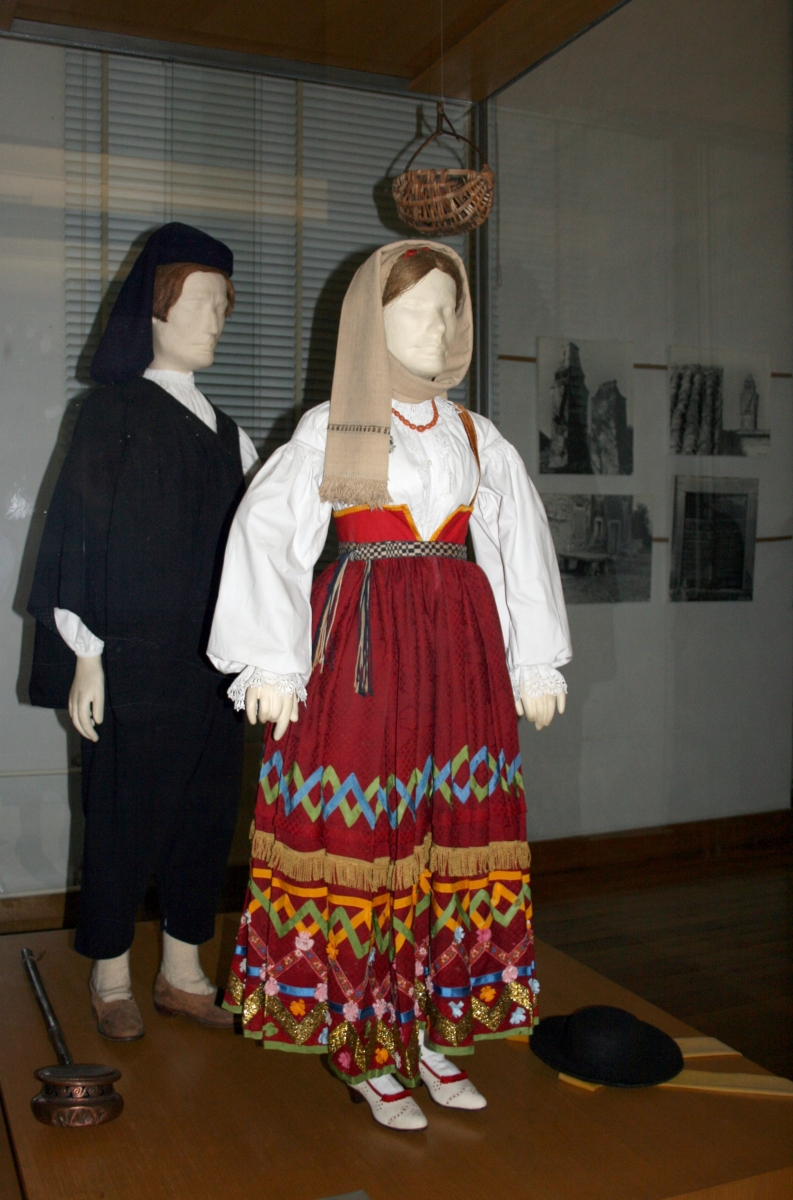
Traditional dress

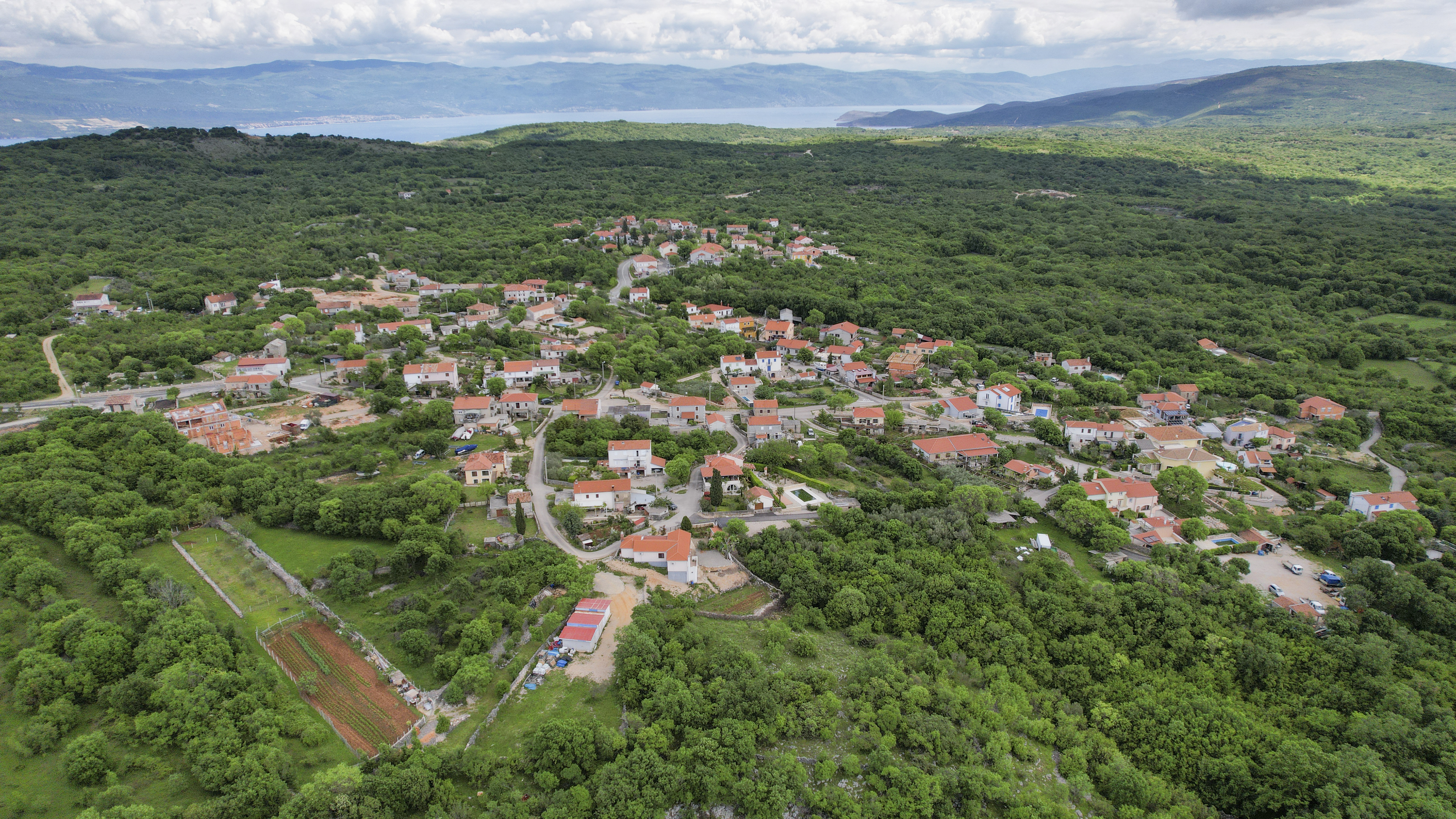
View of Garica

== See also ==
- First Vrbnik Breviary
- List of Glagolitic inscriptions (16th century)

== Bibliography ==
- Draganović, Krunoslav (1939-04-20). Opći šematizam Katoličke crkve u Jugoslaviji. Sarajevo: Akademija "Regina Apostolorum".
