= Zlatan Jovanović =

Serbian politician (born 1963)

Zlatan Jovanović (Serbian Cyrillic: Златан Јовановић; born 3 September 1963) is a politician in Serbia. He was a deputy minister in the government of Serbia from 1998 to 2000, served in the National Assembly of Serbia from 2001 to 2008, and was the mayor of Bajina Bašta from 2011 to 2014. Jovanović is a member of the far-right Serbian Radical Party (Srpska radikalna stranka, SRS).

== Early life and private career ==
Jovanović was born in the village of Lještansko in the municipality of Bajina Bašta, in what was then the Socialist Republic of Serbia in the Socialist Federal Republic of Yugoslavia. He graduated from the University of Belgrade (Užice branch) Faculty of Mechanical Engineering in 1988. He later taught at the Bajina Bašta technical high school and worked as an independent designer for the firm Sloboda Tara.

In October 2014, after leaving political life, he was appointed as acting director of the firm Drinsko-Limske.

== Politician ==
=== Deputy Minister (1998–2000) ===
In early 1998, the Radical Party joined a coalition government led by the Socialist Party of Serbia (Socijalistička partija Srbije, SPS). Several party members were appointed to government positions, including Jovanović, who was named as deputy minister of mining and energy.

Jovanović appeared in the lead position on the Radical Party's electoral list for Užice in the 2000 Yugoslavian parliamentary election; the party did not win any seats in the division. He also sought election to the Bajina Bašta municipal assembly in the concurrent 2000 Serbian local elections. It is not clear from online sources if he was elected; the Radicals won only one seat out of forty-one in that year's local cycle. (This was the last regular local election cycle in which members were elected for single-member constituencies; subsequent local elections have been held under proportional representation.)

Incumbent president Slobodan Milošević was defeated by Vojislav Koštunica in the 2000 Yugoslavian elections, an event that prompted widespread changes in Yugoslavian and Serbian politics. The government of Serbia fell after Milošević's defeat, and Jovanović's term as a deputy minister came to an end.

=== Parliamentarian (2001–07) ===
After the fall of Milošević, a new Serbian parliamentary election was called for December 2000. Serbia's electoral laws were reformed prior to the election, such that the entire country was counted as a single electoral division and all mandates were awarded to candidates on successful lists at the discretion of the sponsoring parties or coalitions, irrespective of numerical order. Jovanović was given the twentieth position on the Radical Party's list and was selected for a mandate when the list won twenty-three seats. The Democratic Opposition of Serbia (Demokratska opozicija Srbije, DOS) won a landslide majority in the election, and the Radicals served in opposition.

Jovanović was given the twenty-fourth position on the SRS's list in the 2003 Serbian parliamentary election and was again chosen for a mandate when the list won eighty-two seats. Although the Radicals won more seats than any other party in this cycle, they fell well short of a majority and ultimately continued in opposition.

Serbia introduced the direct election of mayors in the 2004 Serbian local elections; Jovanović ran as the SRS's candidate in Bajina Bašta and was defeated in the first round of voting. He was elected to the municipal assembly in the same cycle and was chosen as the assembly's president (i.e., speaker) in January 2005, with the support of a bare majority of delegates. He resigned not long thereafter, citing the dysfunctional nature of the Socialist Party caucus, which had supported his candidacy.

He received the 217th position on the SRS's list for the 2007 parliamentary election and was given a mandate for a third term when the party won eighty-one seats. He served on the committee for industry and the committee for transport and communications. As in 2003, the Radicals won the greatest number of seats but remained in opposition. Jovanović was not a candidate in the 2008 parliamentary election and his term in the national assembly ended that year.

=== Mayor of Bajina Bašta (2011–14) ===
Serbia abandoned the direct election of mayors after 2004 and returned to a system in which mayors were chosen by the elected members of city and municipal assemblies. Jovanović was re-elected to the Bajina Bašta assembly in the 2008 local elections and initially served once again in opposition. In April 2011, shifting political alliances brought a coalition of the Radicals and the Democratic Party of Serbia (Demokratska stranke Srbije, DSS) to power, and Jovanović was chosen as mayor.

Serbia's electoral laws were reformed in 2011, such that all mandates were awarded to candidates on successful lists in numerical order. Jovanović led the Radicals to a narrow plurality victory in the 2012 local elections in Bajina Bašta and was confirmed for another term as mayor afterwards, leading a somewhat unusual coalition government with the DSS and the Democratic Party (Demokratska stranka, DS). He also appeared in the fifty-third position on the Radical Party's list in the concurrent 2012 Serbian parliamentary election; weakened by a major split in late 2008, the party fell below the electoral threshold for representation in the assembly.

In 2013, Jovanović announced that Bajina Bašta would erect a life-size monument to Patriarch Pavle at the municipality's most prominent intersection.

The Serbian Progressive Party (Srpska napredna stranka, SNS) later replaced the DS in the local coalition government. Jovanović stood down as mayor in early 2014 and was replaced by Radomir Filipović of the Progressives. He has not sought a return to political life since this time.

== Electoral record ==
=== Local (Bajina Bašta) ===
2004 Bajina Bašta local election: Mayor of Bajina Bašta
Candidate	Party	First round		Second round	
Candidate	Party	Votes	%	Votes	%
Miloje Savić	Socialist Party of Serbia			4,789	51.38
Boban Tomić (incumbent)	Democratic Party			4,531	48.62
Zlatan Jovanović	Serbian Radical Party				
other candidates					
Total				9,320	100.00
