= Zlatan Čolaković =

- Born: February 13, 1955; Zagreb, Croatia
- Died: December 20, 2008 (aged 53); Boston, Massachusetts
- Education: University of Zagreb (BA, MA, PhD)
- Occupations: Homerist, philologist, and researcher
- Father: Enver Čolaković

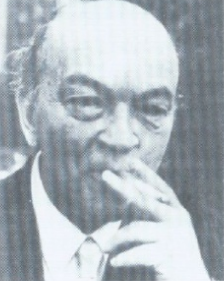
Enver Čolaković, Zlatan's father

Zlatan Čolaković (February 13, 1955 – December 20, 2008) was a Croatian Homerist, philologist and researcher.

== Early life ==
Čolaković was born in Zagreb, Croatia to parents Enver and Stella Čolaković. His father, Enver, was a writer and translator of South Slavic, German, and Hungarian literature. His mother, Stella, was a pianist and music teacher. Both of his parents had been born in Budapest before moving to Zagreb.

== Career ==
He graduated with a degree in Comparative literature and philosophy in 1979, his Master's in 1982, and completed his Doctorate in 1984 at the University of Zagreb Faculty of Philosophy. His doctoral dissertation was an analysis of the tragedies of Sophocles, Euripides, Aeschylus and Aristotle's Poetics.

From 1984-1988, as a Fulbright scholar, he worked with Albert Lord at Harvard University in the Milman Parry Collection, the Slavic division of the Widener Library. He lectured at Harvard University and at Waterloo University in Ontario, Canada. At Harvard, he worked on the Milman Parry Collection, where he transcribed and edited texts and audio tapes of over 90,000 verses of Bosnian epic songs.

At UCLA, he held a lecture on "South Slavic Muslim Epics, Problems of Collecting, Editing and Publishing". He published a long essay with the same title in California Slavic Studies in which he proved the numerous mistakes in the transcription of Harvard publications of South Slavic oral epics, the history of collecting South Slavic epics, and the importance of preserving the epics on film.

In 1989, he collected Bosnian epics in the field with his wife Marina Rojc-Čolaković. They were the first to collect entire Bosnian epic songs on film. He later moved to Canada, where he conducted research on the epic transcriptions, which would result in two volumes and his theory of Post-Tradition and the Post-Traditional Homer.

In Canada, he worked as a court translator for years. As the editor and heir to the literary legacy of Enver Čolaković, he published many of his father's works (Izabrane pjesme, novels Mali svijet, Lokljani. Iz Bosne o Bosni), and prepared Čolaković's books for publication: Jedinac, Biblijske priče XX. stoljeća, Knjiga majci. In 1989, he published his book The Eagles of the Tragic World which encompasses all ancient Greek tragedies, Aristotle and mythic story, and a chapter about epics. He received the Government of Canada Award for his contribution to folklore in 1991. He founded and was the chief researcher of the project The Essence of Bosniak Epics which was sponsored by Matica hrvatska and financed by the Croatian Ministry of Science.

His field work in Montenegro resulted in an immense book written jointly with his wife Marina Rojc-Čolaković entitled, Mrtva Glava Jezik Progovara (transl. A Dead Head Utters a Word), Almanah, Podgorica, 2004, 670 pages. This book, written in both English and Croatian, contains epics from Avdo Međedović and Murat Kurtagić, a comprehensive analysis of the epics which demonstrates his theory of the Post-Traditional Homer and his field notes. In his essay "The Singer above Tales", Zlatan Čolaković offers the new approach to resolve Homeric Question. He distinguishes traditional and post-traditional oral epics, contrary to the contemporary Homeric scholarship, thus moving Homeric Question in the new direction.

== Later life ==
Čolaković was a member of the Croatian Writers' Society, PEN-a, and the Harvard Club of Croatia and Canada. In 2007, "Almanah" from Podgorica published two bilingual critical editions of the poems of Avdo Međedović. Čolaković died from a heart attack in Boston on December 20, 2008. He left behind his children, Ion, Alberta, and Tira, and his wife, Marina Rojc-Čolaković.

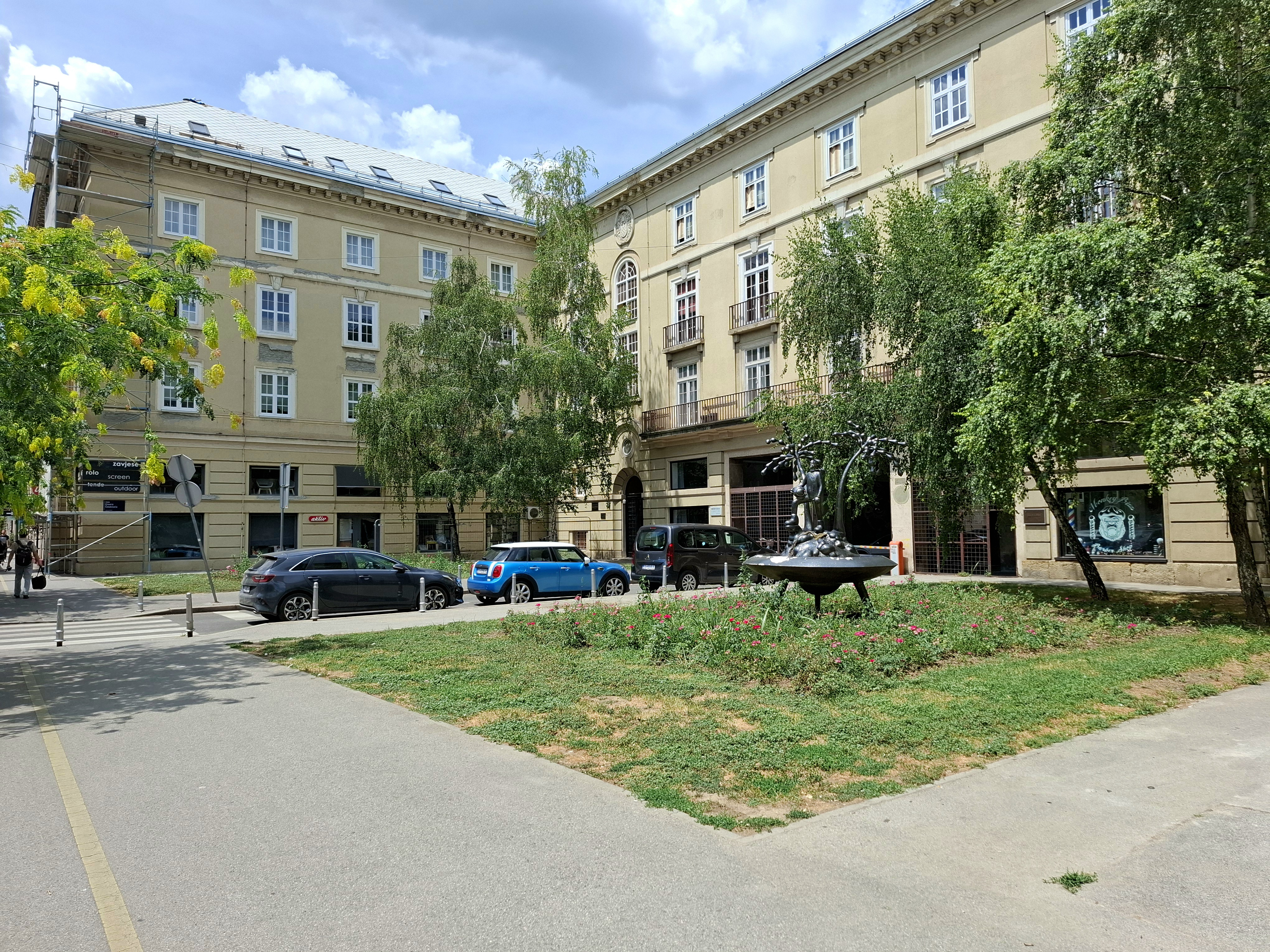
Čolaković Park in Zagreb, named after Zlatan's father

== The Post-Traditional Homer ==
"Post-traditional singers have mastered the technique of epic-creating and of diction far beyond the powers of traditional singers of tales. They were fully aware of it, to the point of a hubristic mastering of tradition itself. They felt that only a good singer could make a good epic and that a bad singer would make a poor epic poem even from the finest epic poem, learned from the best singer. Although this seems obvious to us, it runs counter to the conservative logic of tradition, as it situates the singer above the tales."

"...Homer and Mededovic also "overdo" or magnify the events within a traditionally inherited plot to the extreme. While doing it, they feel free to absorb many other individual poems, or at least many of their themes, into the hybrid poem that they create, thus diminishing the tradition's variety of poems."

(Dr. Zlatan Colakovic, The Singer Above Tales, The Epics of Avdo Mededovic Volume II)
