= Zlatko Sudac =

Croattian Roman Catholic priest (born 1971)

Zlatko Sudac (born 24 January 1971) is a Roman Catholic diocesan priest for the diocese of Krk, Croatia. He is best known for his claim to having stigmata.

Sudac was converted in a seminar given by charismatic priest, Emiliano Tardif, and returned from the seminar with a call to the priesthood. He also had received the gift of tongues. Sudac is from the town of Vrbnik on Krk island, Croatia. He began studying for the priesthood in 1993, after completing his mandatory military service in the Yugoslav army. He was ordained a priest on 29 June 1998. Sudac is well known in Croatia for his alleged stigmata, which he claims to bear as a cross on his forehead, as well as markings on his wrists, feet, and side.

He held religious retreats in his religious centre, Betanija, on the island Lošinj, until 2010, when the Church closed the centre and Sudac was ordered to desist his activities.

Sudac claimed he was being persecuted, that he had never been prohibited from organising his retreats, and that he was being poisoned for 10 years.

As of 2016, Sudac is officially a priest of the Krk Diocese, but is not assigned to any parish and does not say Mass.
