= Zlatica =

Zlatica or Zlatitsa may refer to:

- Zlatica (river), or Aranca, a river of Romania and Serbia
- Zlatitsa (river), a river in Bulgaria, discharging into the Ogosta Reservoir
- Zlatitsa, a town in Bulgaria
- Zlatica, Podgorica, a suburb of Podgorica, Montenegro
  - Stadion Zlatica, a football stadium
- Zlatița, a village in Romania
- Zlatica Mijatović (born 1922), Serbian gymnast
- Stadion Zlatica, a football stadium in Montenegro
