= Zlatko =

Zlatko (Serbian Cyrillic: Златко, pronounced [zlâtko]) is a South Slavic masculine given name. The name is derived from the word zlato meaning gold with hypocoristic suffix -ko common in South Slavic languages.

Zlatko is a given name. Notable people with the name include:

- Zlatko Ćosić, experimental filmmaker and video artist
- Zlatko Čajkovski (1923–1998), Croatian and Yugoslavian football (soccer) player and coach
- Zlatko Đorić (born 1976), Serbian footballer
- Zlatko Škorić (1941–2019), Croatian football player
- Zlatko Šugman (1932–2008), one of Slovenia's best known theater, television and film actors
- Zlatko Arambašić (born 1969), former Australian football (soccer) player
- Zlatko Baloković (1895–1965), Croatian violinist
- Zlatko Burić (born 1953), Croat-Danish actor
- Zlatko Crnković, several people
- Zlatko Dalić (born 1966), Croatian football coach and former player
- Zlatko Dedič (born 1984), Slovenian football forward
- Zlatko Gall (born 1954), Croatian journalist, commentator and rock critic from Split
- Zlatko Grgić (1931–1988), Croatian animator who emigrated to Canada in the late 1960s
- Zlatko Horvat (born 1984), Croatian handball player
- Zlatko Ivanković, Croatian football coach current Head Coach of NK Sloboda Varaždin
- Zlatko Janjić (born 1986), Bosnian footballer
- Zlatko Jovanović (born 1984), Bosnian professional basketball player
- Zlatko Junuzović (born 1987), Austrian footballer of Bosnian descent
- Zlatko Komadina (born 1958), Croatian politician, vice-president of the Social Democratic Party of Croatia
- Zlatko Kramarić (born 1956), Croatian liberal politician from Osijek
- Zlatko Kranjčar (1956–2021), Croatian football manager and striker
- Zlatko Krasni (1951–2008), Serbian poet of Czech origin, lived in Belgrade for most of his life
- Zlatko Krmpotić (born 1958), Serbian football manager and former defender
- Zlatko Lagumdžija (born 1955), Bosniak politician
- Zlatko Manojlović (born 1951), Serbian musician
- Zlatko Mateša (born 1949), the Prime Minister of Croatia from late 1995 until January 31, 2000
- Zlatko Nastevski (born 1957), Macedonian retired football (soccer) player
- Zlatko Papec (1934–2013), Croatian footballer
- Zlatko Pejaković, Croatian singer
- Zlatko Perica (born 1969), guitarist
- Zlatko Portner (1962–2020), Yugoslav handball player
- Zlatko Prangasevic (born 1987), Serbian-Swedish hiphop artist and music producer known as Meta Four
- Zlatko Runje (born 1979), former Croatian football goalkeeper
- Zlatko Saračević (1961–2021), Croatian handball player
- Zlatko Sedlar, Croatian slalom canoeist who competed in the mid-1990s
- Zlatko Sudac (born 1971), Roman Catholic diocesan priest for the diocese of Krk, Croatia
- Zlatko Tanevski (born 1983), Macedonian footballer (defender)
- Zlatko Tesanovic (1956–2012), Bosnian-American physics professor
- Zlatko Tomčić (born 1945), Croatian politician, former leader of the Croatian Peasant Party
- Zlatko Topčić (born 1955), famous multiple award-winning Bosnian writer and screenwriter
- Zlatko Tripić (born 1992), Norwegian-Bosnian footballer
- Zlatko Vitez (born 1950), Croatian theatre and film actor
- Zlatko Vujović (born 1958), former Bosnian footballer who played as a striker
- Zlatko Yankov (Bulgarian: Златко Янков) (born 1966), retired Bulgarian football midfielder
- Zlatko Zahovič (born 1971), retired Slovenian footballer, who played as an attacking midfielder
- Zlatko Zebić (born 1979), Serbian football player
