= Zlatka =

Zlatka (Златка) is a South Slavic female given name. It is derived from the South Slavic word zlato - from the Old Slavic root zolto (gold). The word Златка also literally means marten in Bulgarian. Notable people with the name include:

- Zlatka Gaberova (born 1988), Bulgarian footballer
- Zlatka Georgieva (born 1969), Bulgarian sprinter

== See also ==
- Slavic names
