= List of Glagolitic manuscripts (1300–1399) =

This is a list of manuscripts written in the Glagolitic script in the 14th century.

== List ==
Light red represents manuscripts with Glagolitic only in inclusions or paratext.
Pale red represents mixed manuscripts with Glagolitic as a main script.

Type	Abbreviation	Date	Designation	Library	Place of origin	Folia	Dimensions	Columns and rows	Notes	Scans
demarcation		1309 (October 15)		Arhiv HAZU	Novi Vinodolski	1	20 x 11 cm	1 co	The People of Novigrad and of Bribir Solve a Border Dispute Before Dujam Frankopan (Novogradci i Bribirani rješavaju granični spor pred knezom Dujmom). Lost and rediscovered by Stjepan Ivšić 23 December 1929. Facsimiles published.	Geitler
demarcation		1309 (? 21)		Arhiv HAZU	Novi Vinodolski	1	20 x 11 cm	1 co	Isprava kojom se potvrđuje da Žlemišalj pripada Novogradcima. Written on the 21st of unknown month.	
legal		1325 (5 May)							Istrian Demarcation (Istarski razvod). Original lost, 1546 transcript preserved.	
legal		1325 (October 8)			Venice				In Ivan Lucio's Memorie istoriche di Tragurio published 1674 in Venice on page 203, it is noted that the Register of Trogir included both a Latin and a Croatian version of orders and punishments of doge Ivan Superancio.	
breviary		1300s (beginning)	Berčićevo sobranje fragmenata I, 65 (106)	Petersburg (гос. публ. библиотека)		1	26.5 x 22.5 cm	2 co 29 ro	Acquired by Berčić on Ugljan 24 September 1856. Photographs published in Jagić 1911 and Milčetić 1955 (one side).	IzSt (2008; on 440–441)
miscellany	Fg(C)Pis	1300s (beginning)	Fragm. glag. 89, 90 a-j	Arhiv HAZU, Pazin (Franjevački samostan)	Croatia	17+	15 x 22.5 cm	2 co	Pazin Miscellany fragments (Pazinski odlomci zbornika, Odlomak neke legende ili slova, Fragmenta Pisinensia). Ivan Kukuljević Sakcinski found 11 fragments, while 6 were found in 2005 in the Franciscan Monastery of Pazin. Additional fragments discovered by brother Mavro Velnić of the Franciscan monastery in Pazin. More were found by Anica Nazor in 2008, being used in the cover of a 1647 Settimana Santa by Lodovic Monach. Facsimile published 1957. Parchment. Bibliography:	2010 (2010) [partial], IzSt (2008) [part.] IzSt (2015) [part.], IzSt (2012), IzSt (2008), IzSt (2015: fg 1), IzSt (2015: fg 2), IzSt (2015: fg 3), IzSt (2015: fg 5), IzSt (2015: fg 6), IzSt (2015: fg Nazor)
missal	Fg(M)Pis	1400s (early)		K. de Franceschi family library					Pazin Missal fragment (Pazinski fragment misala). Owned by the family of K. de Franceschi in Venice. Includes FgEust, FgLign, FgTrans, FgNic, FgSerm, FgJac, however these are noted for Fragm. glag. 90 so there may be some confusion with Fg(C)Mis or this could be a duplicate. Bibliography:	
breviary		1300s (beginning)	Fragm. glag. 88	Arhiv HAZU		2	38 x 23.5 cm	2 co 27 ro	Dvolist brevijara. Photograph of one page published in Štefanić 1970.	
Legent of Saint Eustachius	Fg(Leg)NM (FgEust)	1300s (early)	63 R/5	Kapiteljski arhiv, Novo Mesto	Croatia	1	29 x 24.5 cm		Fragment of the Legend of Saint Eustachius from Novo Mesto (Odlomak Legende o svetom Eustahiju iz Novoga Mesta). Discovered in Novo Mesto.	
psalter	Ps1337	1337	No. 2	Library of the Bulgarian Academy of Sciences		317			Sofia Psalter (Софийски песнивец, Pesnivec na car Yoan Aleksandъr). with some Glagolitic (f. 269v, 270r, 271v, 272v, 273r).	
statute		1340 or 1380 or 1388			Senj				Senjski statut. Only survives in Latinic transcription (Arhiv HAZU II d 10).	
breviary		1300s (first half)	Fragm. glag. 21/b	Arhiv HAZU		1	14.2 x 10 cm		Komad lista brevijara (psaltira). Given to Kukuljević by Mate Volarić chaplain on Pag, probably the Mate Volarić born in Vrbnik 1825 who served in Novalja before 1856.	
breviary		1300s (first half)	Fragm. glag. 31/a	Arhiv HAZU	Omišalj?	4	21 x 19.2 cm		Četiri lista brevijara. Includes Proprium de tempore. Oficij is very different from that of other Glagolitic breviaries. The use of če may point to Omišalj. On 12 August 1619 it was together with I b 68. Acquired by Kukuljević in Senj.	
breviary		1300s (first half)	Fragm. glag. 38/k	Arhiv HAZU		1	13 x 6 cm		Komadić psaltira. Contains Psalm 22:2-5, 24:3-5. Acquired by Kukuljević in Dalmacija.	
breviary		1300s (first half)	Fragm. glag. 59, 73	Arhiv HAZU		6			Tri dvolista brevijara – psaltira. Acquired by Kukuljević in Croatian/Austrian Primorje. Kukuljević displayed one of them in an exhibition according to a note on its envelope.	
missal	Fg(M)Drg_{1}	1300s (first half)		Državni Arhiv in Rijeka					First Draguć Missal Fragment (Prvi dragućki fragment misala). Described by Štefanić in Glagoljski notarski protokol u Draguću u Istri, "Radovi Staroslavenskog instituta" 1 (1952).	
missal		1300s (first half)		Krk (arhiv samostana trećoredaca)	Krk	1	17.5 x 18.2 cm		Fragmenat misala. Štefanić removed it from the cover of a copy of the 1743 Nauk karstjanski of Jeronim Bonifačić.	
Homily of Saint John Chrysostom on the Beheading of John the Baptist	FgLab_{2}	1300s (first half)	Glagolitica 16/I Gč 48. Fg. glag. hom.	National and University Library of Slovenia	Croatia	2	23.5 x 17–21.5 cm		Ljubljanski odlomak homilije (Ljubljana homily fragment). Formerly in the Museo Rudolphino Labacensi. Bibliography:	
breviary		1300s (first half)	Fragm. glag. 9	Arhiv HAZU		1	38 x 27 cm		List brevijara. Acquired by Kukuljević in Trsat, likely from the Franciscan monastery there. Photograph of one page published in Štefanić 1970.	
breviary		1300s (first half)	Fragm. glag. 41	Arhiv HAZU		1	35.5 x 21.4 cm		List brevijara. Once used as cover of a book that was property of fra đakon Ludovik Milčetić who was gvardijan of the Franciscan monastery of the Third Order in Krk 1787–1789. Kukuljević acquired it from a Franciscan. Photograph of one page published in Štefanić 1970.	
abecedary		1400s (after 1356)	CLM 14684	Munich (BSB)		100			Emmeramer Abecedary (Emmeramer Abecedarien). In Latin manuscript with other alphabets including Glagolitic and Cyrillic.	MDZ
psalter, book of hours	PsLob	1359	XXIII G 67 (IX D 12)	National Library of the Czech Republic	Senj	160	12 x 10 cm		Lobkovićev psaltir. Scribe: a deacon named Kirin. Discovered at the beginning of the 19th century. Partial facsimile in Vajs 2016 (IA). Bibliography:	GHR, IzSt (2008)
epistolary		1366–1367	No 55	SANU-Beograd	Serbia	258			Cyrillic with Glagolitic and Greek letters included in Cyrillic corrective hand on folia 48v, 50v, 51r, 55r.	
missal		1367–1399 (about)	Cod. Slav. 220	Austrian National Library		2			Missae votiva des Missale Romanum. Parchment.	
missal	MNov	1368	Cod. Slav. 8	Austrian National Library	Lika?	271	32 x 24 cm	2 co x 29 ro	Novak's Missal (Misal kneza Novaka, Novakov misal). Written and illuminated by knez Peter Novak Disislavić of clan Mogorović, a knight in the court of king Louis I of Hungary. It later served as the type for the Missale Romanum Glagolitice. Bibliography:	ÖNB (by 2016), GHR, IzSt (2008)
breviary	BrVat_{5}+BrVat_{6}	~1350-1375	Borgiano illirico 5+6	Vatican Library	Tribihovići, Lika	248+212	31 x 22 cm		Vatikanski brevijar Illirico 5+6 (Vatican breviary Illirico 5+6). Ransomed from the Turks in 1487. At one point, this manuscript was split in two. The second half was written by a scribe named Fabijan. Microfilms by 1952 at NSK, photocopy by 1977 (Star. inst. F 30, F 39). Bibliography:	IzSt (5: 2008), IzSt (6: 2008)
missal		1370		Ljubljana (Nadškofijski arhiv)	Srakovina (Bakovac Kosinjski)	1	32 x 24 cm	2 co 36 ro	Scribe: pop Juraj in Srakovina (today Bakovac Kosinjski). The Glagolitic folium, used as a cover of the 1676–1699 christenings register of the župnija Podbrezje, was first noted in preparation for a 1972 publication (page 420). Following that it was examined by Zor. It was then removed from the book. Photograph of one side published in Zor 1981. A 1982 microfilm is housed at the Staroslavenski institut in Zagreb.	
missal		1370 (about)	Glagolitica 16/I Gč 48. Križe 4, 5	NUK	Srakovina (Bakovac Kosinjski)	2	32 x 21.3 cm, 30.6 x 24 cm		Križe 4 and Križe 5. Once belonged to the same manuscript, and to the same manuscript as the 1370 missal folio from the Nadškofijski arhiv. Discovered by Lovro Pintar in Križe, who sent it to Fran Levstik.	
protocol		1371 (March 10) -							Protokol riječkoga glagoljaškoga zbornoga kaptola. A 14th century parchment manuscript. Lost.	
grant		1372 (October 5)		Ljubljana (archive of Franciscan monastery)	Brinje	1	25.5 x 13.5 cm	1 co	Lord Anž Frankopan Grants the Pauline Monastery the Proceeds from his Lands in Baška Draga to the Monastery of Holy Salvation by Senj (Knez Anž Frankapan daruje pavlinskom samostanu Sv. Spasa kod Senja prihode s njegovih posjeda u Baškoj Drazi). First published 1954 by Vjekoslav Štefanić.	1954 (2006)
missal	Fg(M)Šm (FgMŠma)	1374		Ljubljana (Nadškofijski arhiv)		2	46 x 34 cm		Discovered in Šmartno pri Litiji. One of 5 fragments proposed to have originally been part of a single manuscript.	2008 (2008), IzSt (2008)
missal		1374		Ljubljana (Nadškofijski arhiv)		1	32 x 23.2 cm		Discovered in Podbrezje where it had been used as the cover of a register of christenings 1676–1699. One of 5 fragments proposed to have originally been part of a single manuscript.	2008 (2008)
missal		1374		Ljubljana (Nadškofijski arhiv)		2	31.7 x 20.3 cm		Used as the cover of the Mengeš urbarium of 1543. One of 5 fragments proposed to have originally been part of a single manuscript.	[=https://hrcak.srce.hr/22393 2008] (2008)
missal		1374	Glagolitica 16/I fund, br. 5	NUK		1	32 x 21.6 cm	2 co 34 ro	Križe pri Tržiću 5. Discovered in Križe pri Tržiću per note of Lovro Pintar parish priest of Breznica. Acquired by the NUK while still the Lyceal Bibliothek zu Laibach. One of 5 fragments proposed to have originally been part of a single manuscript.	2008 (2008)
missal		1374	Glagolitica 16/I fund, br. 4	NUK			32 x 21.3 cm	2 co 34 ro	Križe pri Tržiću 4. Discovered in Križe pri Tržiću. Acquired by the NUK while still the Lyceal Bibliothek zu Laibach. One of 5 fragments proposed to have originally been part of a single manuscript.	2008 (2008)
missal		1374		Vipava (župnijski urad)			30 x 20 cm	2 co 32 ro	Used as cover for the register of christenings of the parish of the Church of Saint Stephen written 1677–1694. Found and still housed in the župnijski urad in Vipava. One of 5 fragments proposed to have originally been part of a single manuscript.	[=https://hrcak.srce.hr/22393 2008] [part.]
miscellany	CPar	1375–1379	Slave 73	Bibliothèque nationale de France	Croatia	296	15 x 11.5 cm		Borislavićev zbornik. Scribes: Grigorije son of Martin Borislavić (the psalter, finished 1375), Stipan (the missal), prvad Nikola of Lindar (remainder, finished 1379). The portions written by Nikola may have been added later from a separate manuscript. Acquired by Paris from a library in Spain in 1951. Described in Tadin 1954. Bibliography:	BnF, IzSt (2008)
legal		1375		Arhiv HAZU	Baška	1	22+11.5 x 32 cm		Senjanin Ivan Mikulanić prodaje pavlinskom samostanu Sv. Spasa kod Senja zemljišni posjed u Baškoj Drazi za 12 dukata; Rada, kći Krasnelinova, daruje samostanu sv. Spasa zemlju u Bašci na otoku Krku. Acquired by Kukuljević Sakcinski. One deed dated 11 August 1375 (written by "Mirša prvad, ki sam pisac opći"), another dated 23 September, both on same parchment.	
note		1378			Prague (Emmaus Monastery)				Note of knez Pavel the abbot called Nedvied. Scribe: probably abbot Pavel "Nedvied". Original codex containing the note is lost, but a 1602 facsimile survives on page 363 of the Diadochchos of Bartosz Paprocki. Bibliography:	
legal		1379 (March 12)		Dobrinj (župni arhiv), Arhiv HAZU	Dobrinj				Pavao Banić i njegov brat Dminić prodaju zemlje i drmune plovanu Mavru od Dobrinja. Survives in 18th century Latin transcription by Antun Cutinis, which preserves the Glagolitic year and one I. Acquired by Kukuljević. Kept at Arhiv HAZU. Glagolitic transcription by Antun Cutinis from second half of 18th century discovered in the same book in the župni arhiv in Dobrinj in which the 1100 grant survives, but it seems to be a back-translation from Latin or Italian.	
missal		1300s (first half to middle)	Fragm. glag. 106	Arhiv HAZU	Kvarner or Istria?	10	29.8 x 22.8 cm	2 co 28 ro	Počinini odlomci misala. Parchment. Includes marginal note on f. 1 by Mateša Tomičin. Jagić and Štefanić places its origin in Kvarner or Istria by words sutlь and petěhь. But it arrived in the Zadar-Šibenik archipelago judging from the character of the note. Discovered by Zadar professor-priest Roko Počina around 1890, who donated them to JAZU. One photograph in Štefanić 1970. Bibliografija:	IzSt (2008)
missal		1300s	Cim. 94 (= 4^{o} Cod. ms. 874)	Munich (Ludwig-Maximilians-Universität München, Universitätsbibliothek)		1			Munich missal fragment. Acquired by Dobrovsky in 1812.	LMU (17 December 2010), IzSt (2013)
missal		1300s (first half to middle)	fragments collection, No 1	Wertheim (Löwenstein-Wertheim archive)	Croatia or Prague	2	35 x 21 cm		Wetheim fragments. First reported by Schuster. Written in Prague or brought there from Pašman.	
breviary	Fg(Br)Foj	1300s (first decades of second half)	n/a	n/a	Croatia	1	17.5 x 23 cm		Fojnički glagoljski odlomak brevijara (Fojnica Glagolitic breviary fragment). It was found in 1950 by Josip Hamm in the Fojnica Franciscan Monastery, and for some time it was kept in the library of the Franciscan Monastery of Sants Peter and Paul on the Hill in Livno, but today it is lost. It was separated by R. Drljić from a copy of Matija Jerković's 1582 Ražmišljanja. Text closest to BrVat_{19}. It was used in the binding of the printed Razmišljanja of Matija Jerković published 1582 in Venice. Bibliography:	
		1300s (middle)	Fragm. glag. 80	Arhiv HAZU		16		2 co	Ostrišci iz Apokrifa o prepiranju Isusa s Đavlom. 16 small and very small fragments. Similar to text of IV a 48 and VII 30.	
breviary		1300s (middle)		Arhiv Riječke nadbiskupije		1	27.5 x 20.2 cm		Used in the cover of a 1605 Qvadripartitae conciones. The book belonged to the library of the Jesuit college in Rijeka. Discovered 1985 in the Knjižnica Nadbiskupije riječko-senjske. It was removed that year.	
breviary		1300s (middle)		Novi Vinodolski (župni ured)	Krk	2	34.5 x 25.5 cm		Discovered by Milan Mihaljević in the parishioner's house in Novi Vinodolski on 16 May 1998. In July 1998, Mihaljević brought it to Zagreb to be microfilmed on the 21st (copies housed in the HDA and in the Staroslavenski institut), then returned it to Novi Vinodolski.	2000 (2006)
missal	MVat_{4}	1300s (middle)	Borgiano illirico 4	Vatican Library	Omišalj (possibly)	278	31.2 x 24 cm	2 co x 31 ro	Vatikanski misal Illirico 4 (Vatican missal Illirico 4). Microfilm in Zagreb by 1952. Bibliography:	IzSt (2008)
missal		1300s (by middle)	Fragm. glag. 34 (Kuk. 554)	Arhiv HAZU		2	26 x 20 cm	2 co	Dvolist misala. Contains Proprium sanctorum. Once part of cover of Misse za mrtve. Parchment.	
breviary	BrPad	1300s (middle)	MS 2282	Library of the University of Padua	Croatia	308	14 x 21.5 cm	2 co x 29 ro	Padovanski brevijar. Acquired from a Venetian antiquary. Photocopy made 15 April 1988 by Biblioteca Universitaria di Padova (Star. inst. F 134).	IzSt (2008)
breviary		1300s (middle)	Fragm. glag. 42	Arhiv HAZU		1	18.7 x 15.8 cm		Krnji list brevijara. Acquired by Kukuljević in Glavotok.	
breviary		1300s (middle)	Fragm. glag. 60, 82 (III b 10)	Arhiv HAZU		3			Tri lista brevijara. Fragment 82 was once used as a cover of Ordo agendorum et cantandorum in actibus Processionalibus pro FF. Franciscanis regularis observantiae in provincia Bosnae, Croaticae, Carniolae etc. Venetiis MDCLX. Other papers used for the same cover were written in Latinic and belonged to a 17th-century school practice book in a Kajkavian dialect with Hungarian orthography. Acquired by Kukuljević from the fratarska knjižnica u Klanjcu.	
breviary		1300s (middle)	Fragm. glag. 98	Arhiv HAZU		1	20.8 x 17 cm		Krnji list brevijara.	
homily		1300s (middle)	Fragm. glag. 108	Arhiv HAZU		2	13.5 x 10.2 cm		Fragment Tumačenja Deset božjih zapovijedi ("Fragment govora o svetkovanju nedjelje"). Translation from Czech. Photograph of one page published in Štefanić 1970. Photocopy mad before 1990 housed at Staroslavenski institut (F 336). Bibliography: Graphically similar to IV d 56 of Novi Vinodolski. Once possession of Benković family in Grižane. Probably once part of Kukuljević collection.	
breviary-psalter		1360s/1370s	1 D c 1/4 (A, B), 1/10, 1/12, 1/13	Prague (National Museum)	Croatia/Prague	4 + 2 + 2 + 2	33 x 22.5 cm	2 co 29 ro	Části chorvatsko-hlaholského breviáře (includes Zlomky dobřichovické, Borotické zlomky and others). The Emayzský breviár̆ni žaltár (1 D c 1/4AB, 1/10, 1/12, 1/13). Scribes of the breviary-psalter: hand A (the text), hand B (corrections); the paschal table of 1/10 received additions from two further hands C (f. 2r) and D (f. 2v). The fragments of 1/4 had been used in book covers whose earliest known dates are 1618 (fragment A) and 1620–1650 (fragment B). 1/10 was used in the cover of a Liber sententiarum from 1618. The illumination on 1/4B suggests the manuscript was illuminated in the 1360s or 1370s. 1/12 was used in the cover of a 1617 zádušní kniha of the Dobřichovice parish. 1/13 was used in the cover of an unspecified parish register. The Emayzský breviár̆ni žaltár fragments were discovered gradually in various Central Czech parishes administered by the Order of the Cross with the Red Star. 1 D c 1/4 was discovered in Tursko, 1/10 in Karlín, 1/12 in Dobřichovice, 1/13 in Borotice. Fragment A of 1/4 was discovered by 1834 through V. Hanka, while fragment B was discovered in 1840 by Jan Jungmann; both in the parish archive. Fragment 1/10 was discovered by Václav Hanka in 1843 in the kancelář křižovníků building. Fragment 1/12 was discovered by Antonín Schmid in 1868 in the parish archives. Fragment 1/13 was discovered by František Hoppe in 1879 in the parish archives. Partial facsimiles in Čermak 2020. Bibliography:	
breviary	BrVnd (BrVind_{121})	1380	Cod. slav. 121	Austrian National Library	Croatia	22	28.2 x 23.0 cm		Bečki odlomak brevijara (Vienna breviary fragment). Bibliography:	ÖNB
confirmation deed		1380	Pergamene dell' Archivio Notarile di Zara, fasc. I No 219 (A. 1380)	Državni arhiv Zadar	Sokol (Bihać)	1	22.5 x 15 cm	1 co	Sokol confirmation (Sokolska isprava). Sokolski knez Ilprant i podknez Petar Svija zajedno sa bihaćkim sucima potvrđuju da je Stanislav, sin Novakov, koji je bio u sporu s Cvitom Filetom, vlasnik jednog zemljišnog posjeda kod Bihaća. First published in Latinic translation with photograph 1927 by Arturo Cronia and Glagolitic abecedary inside cover.	1927
missal	MLab_{1} (MBer_{1})	1390–1420	Ms 162 (C 162a/2)	National and University Library of Slovenia	Krbava	245	34.5 x 25.5 cm		Prvi ljubljanski (beramski) misal. First Ljubljana (Beram) missal. Written and illuminated by Bartol Krbavac. Used in Beram, Istria. Bibliography:	DKS (22 December 2014), NSK, GHR, IzSt (2017 from NUK)
psalter, missal, breviary	PsPar	1380 (?)	Slave 11	Bibliothèque nationale de France	Dalmatia	200	11 x 17 cm		Pariški psaltir (Paris psalter). It also contains 9 hymns. Microfilm in Zagreb by 1952. Bibliography:	BnF, IzSt (2008)
legal		1381 (August 9)		Arhiv HAZU	Modruš	1	25 x 18 cm	1 co	Knez krčki Stefan odpuštja fratrom manastira sv. Spasa dohodke, koji su ga išli od njihovih vinogradah u drazi bašćanskoj. Acquired by Kukuljević Sakcinski. First published by Šafařík.	
breviary	BrAc	1384?	III c 12 (Kuk. 802)	Arhiv HAZU	Istria	70	29.2 x 20.5 cm	2 co 42 ro	Akademijin brevijar (Academy Breviary). It includes a psalter. One hand f. 1-61c, a different hand f. 61d-70d. First hand is more conservative and similar in ornamentation of initials in BrDrg and likely the same as hand A of BrDrg (which is dated 1407). Second hand likely responsible for ornamentations. Dated to 1384 on the basis of the Easter table. Probably from the Pavlikani rather than Benediktinci or Franjevci. Kukuljević believed it was from Istria. It may have been, but Kukuljević purchased it from the Rosenthal antiquary in Munich after receiving the notice about it being for sale through Ivan Frankói who forwarded it 11 July 1879. Acquired by JAZU through Kukuljević archive. Photocopies and microfilms in Zagreb by 1977. Partial facsimile in Vajs 2016 (IA). Photograph of one page published in Štefanić 1970. Bibliography:	IzSt (2014), IzSt (2008)
treaty		1393 (August 15)		Arhiv HAZU	Počitelj	1	35 x 12 cm	1 co	Počitelj treaty (Počiteljska isprava). Tomaš and Butko, lords of Krbava, confirm a peace between Dujmam Miničević and Netrmac and his kin. Acquired by Kukuljević Sakcinski. First published by Šafárik 1853. Jagić photograph incomplete, Geitler photograph complete.	1883
fourfold gospel	Dur	1395	Manuscrits. Ms. 255	Carnegie Library of Reims		32	23.5 x 17.6 cm	2 co	Codex written in the Emmaus monastery in Prague, commonly known as the Emmaus Evangelie or Reims Gospel. Includes a Czech Glagolitic colophon. Facsimile published 1843. Microfilm made at BnF in 1990 (from which 1991 copy M 238 at Star. inst.). Bibliography:	BMR (2002), IzSt (2010)
demarcation		1395 (November 2)	Acta Collegii Jesuitarum Fluminensis, fasc. 11, br. 1	HDA	Divin?				Kožljac demarcation (Kožljački razvod). A Latin translation also survives alongside a Latin act from 1539. A 17th century Glagolitic transcription also survives. Once kept in Budapest in the Hungarian National Archive as M.O.D.L. 35819.	
miscellany	CIv (CIvan)	1300s-1400s or 1395		Saint Francis Xavier Monastery in Zagreb	Croatia				Ivančićev zbornik (Ivančić miscellany). Once at Glavotok. Copy of 1496 incunabula Spovid općena bound to it. Bibliography:	IzSt (2008), IzSt (2008)
breviary	BrVO	1396	Cod. slav. 3	Austrian National Library	Omišalj	468	35 x 27 cm	2 co	Brevijar Vida Omišljanina (Breviary of Vid of Omišalj). The first part, until page 379, was written by a scribe named Vid of Omišalj, for the church of Roč. Microfilm made 1952 for NSK. Bibliography:	ÖNB, IzSt (2008)
abecedary	AbT (TAbc)	1390s	Ms. 95	Tours (Bibliothèque municipale)	Sorbonne	129			Paris abecedary (Istud alphabetum et chrawaticum). In Latin manuscript with Glagolitic f. 075v-78v. Scribe: Georgius de Sclavonia "Juraj iz Slavonije" of Brežice on the Sava.	PBFr, WM
missal		1300s (second half to end)	Fragm. glag. 57	Arhiv HAZU		1	22.2 x 17.5 cm	2 co	Komad lista misala. Parchment.	
bulla		1300s (after 1371)		NSK		1			Bula pape Grgura XI. izdana Pavlinima. Translation of the papal bull of 1371.	NSK
breviary	Fg(Br)Bein	1390–1410	Beinecke MS 749	Arhiv HAZU?	Croatia	2	30.2 x 21.3 cm	2 co	Beinecke bifolium. Housed at the Beinecke Rare Book and Manuscript Library.	Yale, IzSt (2012)
missal		1300s (second half)	Fragm. glag. 45	Arhiv HAZU		1	20.7 x 12.8 cm	2 co	Komad lista misala. Once used as the cover for a notebook a student named Juroj in Dobrinj. Acquired by Kukuljević in Gorica from the library of S. Kociančić, who may have acquired it from Ivan Črnčić. Parchment.	
breviary		1300s (second half)	XIV C 55 (inv. br. 5417, old sign. XIV B 21)	Rijeka (Naučna biblioteka)		4			Četiri ostriška brevijara. Once used in the cover of a 1625 Vincenzio Giliberto, Le sacre corone dell' anno ecclesiastico. Belonged to the library of the Jesuit college in Rijeka in 1637.	
breviary		1300s (second half)	Fragm. glag. 102	Arhiv HAZU		1	26.5 x 18.2 cm		List brevijara.	
breviary		1300s (second half)	Fragm. glag. 8	Arhiv HAZU		1	21.8 x 17.5 cm		List brevijara. Once used as cover for 1638 book Život od Isukrsta by Kašić. Acquired by Kukuljević from Turčić in Porat.	
breviary		1300s (second half)	Fragm. glag. 20	Arhiv HAZU		1			Tri sitna ostriška brevijara. Acquired by Kukuljević in Bribir.	
		1300s (second half)	IV d 56	Arhiv HAZU		10	12.7 x 9.7 cm		Egzorcizmi, zapisi i recepti. Written in poluustav by anonymous scribe in Novi Vinodolski for use by priestss. Once belonged to the same codex as IV d 55, though the two were not written at the same time. The two were bound together by the time of the 17th century Latin notes by Mate Benković in Grižane. Possibly sent to JAZU as late as after Milčetić's work for his 1911 book and before 1913, but path to JAZU was unknown even then. Photograph of one page published in Štefanić 1970. Bibliography:	IzSt (2008)
missal		1300s	Berčićevo sobranje fragmenata II, 144	Petersburg (гос. публ. библиотека)		1		2 co	Okrnjen odlomak misala. Sent to Berčić by Ivan Gurato from Rab 30 July 1864. One side of 144 photographed in Milčetić 1955.	IzSt (2008; on 49–50)
missal		1300s	Fragm. glag. 100	Arhiv HAZU		2	20.2 x 15 cm		Krnji dvolist misala. Text very similar to that of MVat_{4}. Came to JAZU 1939. It was used as the cover of a Quadernicha notebook dated 1670 or later originating with the family Miklić of Bribir in Vinodol. Donated to JAZU by Fran Jurković, principal of the građanska škola in Sušak. Parchment.	
missal		1300s	Fragm. glag. 38/f, g, h, i, j_{1}, j_{2}, j_{3}	Arhiv HAZU		8			Sedam odlomaka misala.	
missal		1300s	VII H 7 No 2061 (old signature, older sign. VII H 29)	Rijeka (Naučna biblioteka)		1	13.5 x 7 cm		Komad jednog lista misala. Once used as the cover of a book, though that book was lost and only these Glagolitic fragments remain.	
breviary	Fg(Br)Smb_{2}	1300s		Samobor (Samostan Uznesenja BDM)		1	32 x 22 cm		Drugi samoborski fragment brevijara. Once served in the cover of the 1748 printed Physiologie et Patologica medica. Discovered 2020 by Drenka Veronek in the Franciscan Samostan Uzenesenja Blažene Djevice Marije in Samobor. Likely arrived in Samobor from the Franciscan monastery of Jastrebarsko, whose library was joined to that of Samobor in 1982. Textually closest to BrVat_{19}.	2022 (2022) [low res.]
breviary		1300s	Fragm. glag. 38/c	Arhiv HAZU		1	16.5 x 20.5 cm		Dva komada lista brevijara. Includes a 16th-century note. Acquired by Kukuljević in Dalmacija.	
breviary		1300s	Fragm. glag. 44	Arhiv HAZU		1	20.5 x 14.6 cm		List brevijara.	
breviary		1300s	Fragm. glag. 25/b, c, e, f	Arhiv HAZU		4			Četiri sitna ostriška brevijara.	
breviary		1300s	Fragm. glag. 25/g	Arhiv HAZU		1			Oderak iz brevijara.	
breviary		1300s	Fragm. glag. 12	Arhiv HAZU		1	21.6 x 16.7 cm		List brevijara.	
breviary		1300s	Fragm. glag. 68	Arhiv HAZU		1	16.6 x 14.4 cm		Komad lista brevijara. Acquired by Kukuljević on the island of Krk.	
breviary		1300s	sign. 539	Trieste (Biblioteca civica)		1	31 x 24.5 cm			1995 (1 side), IzSt (1 side)
breviary		1300s	S.C. 2-533	Trieste (Biblioteca civica)		1	33.7 x 21.7 cm			1995 (1 side), IzSt (1 side)
homiliary		1300s	Ms 2047 (S.f.48 / 3.4 and 3.5)	NUK		2			Second Ljubljana homiliary (Drugi ljubljanski homilijar).	DSK (16 February 2022), IzSt (2017 from NUK)
missal		1300s	1 D c 1/23 (LA 14 H 36 – XIV/2)	Prague (National Museum)	Croatia	2	20 x 16.8 cm		Zlomek chorvatsko-hlaholského misálu. Discovered in 1839 by the evangelical preacher Samo Chalubka in Jelšavská Teplica, who sent it to Janko Šafařík, who gave it to his uncle Pavel Josef Šafařík. Bibliography:	
missal		1400s	1 D c 1/28 (LA 14 H 36 – XIV/5)	Prague (National Museum)	Croatia	1	16.8 x 14 cm	1 co 23 ro	Zlomek chorvatsko-hlaholského misálu. Acquired by the National Museum with the library of Pavel Josef Šafařík, who must have acquired it by 1861. It was bound in a Uteri Placenta Matthiae Tiling manuscript, with lines of Latin written between the Glagolitic lines.	
missal?		1300s (end)	no sign. as of 2011	Rijeka (Knjižnica Teološkog fakulteta)		4			Dva dvolista misala.	
breviary		1300s (end) / 1400s (beginning)	Berčićevo sobranje fragmenata I, 5 (old 10)	Petersburg (гос. публ. библиотека)		2	14.2 x 10.4 cm		Ostrižak br. 5 and br. 6. Two separate folia from the same manuscript. Acquired by Berčić in Prvić on 8 August 1848. Facsimiles published by Karinski in 1908 and of one side by Štefanić in his poshumous publication of Milčetić in 1955.	IzSt (2008), IzSt (2008; 5 on 543, 6 on 542)
breviary		1300s (end) / 1400s (beginning)	Berčićevo sobranje fragmenata I, 82, 83	Petersburg (гос. публ. библиотека)		2	29.5 x 19.5 cm	2 co 38 ro	Once used as book covers. Discovered by Berčić on 20 June 1860 on Žirje.	IzSt (2008; on 403–406)
breviary		1300s	sign. XXVII-C II	Rijeka (Naučna biblioteka)		2	36 x 26 cm	2 co 39 ro	A bifolium once used as a cover for a copy of the 1507 Plinii Secundi, Naturalis historiae. Includes the 1779 note A Julio de Benzoniis assessore guberniali dono datus Magnifico Publico Fluminensi anno 1779 and the note I. A. D. Benzoni S. R. I. Eques. Arcidiac. Mod. et Canonic. Flum.. Removed in 1950 from 1507 book. Photograph of one page in Štefanić 1953.	
		1300s	NR 363	Rijeka (Knjižnica Teološkoga fakulteta)		1			Odlomak. Once part of cover of J. A Weber's 1681 Nucleus Juris Episcopalis et decisionibus theol. Practicae.	
		1300s	Fragm. glag. 78	Arhiv HAZU		6			Šest neodređenih ostrižaka. Numbered 1–6. Unknown provenance.	
fourfold gospel		1300s, 1600s/1700s	A. I. Hludov collection No 13	GIM-Moskva	Serbia	294			Hludov Gospel. Cyrillic with Glagolitic paratext on folia 12r, 82v. Also Cyrillic abecedary including Glagolitic letters from 17th-18th century.	
breviary	Fg(Br)Dub_{1}	1300s		Arhiv HAZU		1			Prvi dubašljanski odlomak brevijara (First Dubašnica fragment of breviary).	
breviary	Fg(Br)Hli	1300s		Franjevački samostan Gorica in Livno	Croatia	1			Used in the binding of the Habdelićev Dikcionar of 1670. Described by Josip Hamm in Datiranje glagoljskih tekstova, "Radovi Staroslavenskog instituta" 1 (1956).	
breviary	Fg(Br)Prg	1300s		Augustine Monastery library Prague					Bifolium of breviary. Described by Milčetić 1911.	
breviary	Fg(Br)NG	1300s	Brev. glag.	Güssing (Bibliothek des Franziskanerklosters)		2			Güssing Fragment. Used as the cover of an incunabulum. Discovered 1963 by Hamm. Photocopies in Zagreb by 1990. Bibliography:	2021
breviary	BrVb_{2}	1300s	n/a	Vrbnik parish library	Vrbnik	295	36 x 27 cm	2 co x 28-29 ro	Drugi vrbnički brevijar (Second Vrbnik breviary). Written by 3-4 hands. Microfilm made by 1952 for JAZU. Bibliography:	IzSt (2011 by ArhivPRO d.o.o.)
breviary	BrVb_{4}	1300s	n/a	Vrbnik parish library	Croatia	112	35 x 27 cm		Četvrti vrbnički brevijar (Fourth Vrbnik breviary). Kept in Vrbnik from 1605 on. Microfilm for JAZU by 1952;	IzSt (2011 from 2010 scan to CD by ArhivPRO)
breviary	BrMed	1300s	Plut.01.10	Laurentian Library in Florence	Croatia	124	22 x 16 cm	2 co 31 ro	Medicejski brevijar (Medici breviary). Once belonged to Apponyi Library in Oponice. Acquired by the Medicean Library in Florence. Catalogued as early as 1752, but discovered by researchers only in 1966 by V. J. Gajdoš. Bibliography:	[opac.bmlonline.it/Record.htm?record=19201618124910298909 BML]
breviary		1300s		NSK	Croatia	2	33 x 26 cm	2 co	Ulomak brevijara.	NSK, GHR
psalter		1300s	F.п.I.2.	RNB-Sankt-Peterburg	Russia	334			Psalter without commentary. Cyrillic with Glagolitic in titles.	
breviary	BrPm	1300s, 1400s	III b 10	Arhiv HAZU	Croatia	414	27.5 x 20.5 cm	2 co 29 ro	Pašmanski brevijar (Pašman breviary). First folio of codex comes from an 11th-century Latin manuscript. F. 405-414 were written about a half century later and added in, paleographically dated to the 1400s. Language is ikavian but confusingly uses both ča and če like BrVb_{1} and BrVO. Yet forms like (j)ema and (j)emaju point to it having been written in the Zadar area as opposed to Kvarner, though the text from which it was copied or possibly the original form of the manuscript were probably from Krk. Includes numerous notes, including a 15th-century abecedary. The earliest datable note is from 1433 or maybe 1434. By the 1442 note of priest Radmil it was kept in the extinct village Račice (between Zadar and Vrana, near Gorica and Raštane), at least as late as 1532. Berčić learned of the breviary some time between 1850 and 1853 according to one of his manuscripts written then kept at Glavotok. Berčić wrote to Pašman parish priest Juraj Baćinić who had inherited it 1821 from the previous parish priest Grgur Burić, and related that there was a tradition the manuscript had once been part of the library of archbishop Matej Karaman. It is unknown how it ended up in JAZU but Berčić probably played a role. Photograph of three pages published in Štefanić 1970. Šafařík made a transcription housed in Prague under sign. IX E 20. Microfilm by 1952 for JAZU, photocopy by 1977 (Star. inst. F 32).	IzSt
missal	Fg(Mi)Krak	1300s	BJ Rkp. 5567 I ("Fragmenta glagolitica")	Jagiellonian Library	Croatia	3	12.2 x 18–19 cm	1 co	Krakovski odlomak misala (Krakow missal fragment). Possibly arrived in Kraków from Prague. Once at Kleparz Monastery and Vašica believes it may have been written there. First microfilm in Zagreb made 1981. Bibliography:	JB, 1948, IzSt (2009)
		1300s	R4493	National and University Library in Zagreb		14			Fragmenta croato-glagolitica.	GHR
triodion		1300s	F.п.I.74	National Library of Russia		154 + 3	25 × 18,5 cm	1	Triod Postnaja and Cvetnaja. Known as "Šafarík Triod", in the past owned by Pavel Jozef Šafárik. Pages 49, 51 and 69 have glagolitic texts.	NLR
missal		1300s (end)	III	Krk (arhiv samostana trećoredaca)	Krk	1	21 x 14.5 cm		Komad lista misala. Photograph in Štefanić 1960.	
missal	Fg(M)Paš	1300s (end)	Glagolitica, br. 4	Arheološki muzej u Splitu		4			Pašmanski fragment misala. Discovered by don Luka Jelić 1905 in Pašman. Given or intended to be given by him to the Knjižnica Sred. Bogosl. Sjemeništa in Zadar. Studied by Josef Vajs at one point. Entered the Arheološki muzej u Splitu with the remains of Arsen Duplančić.	IzSt (2015)
breviary	Fg(Br)Thm	1300s (second half)	1 D c 1/14, 1/8, Музейное собрание (ф. 178)	Prague (National Museum), Russian State Library	Croatia/Prague	2 + 1 + 2	33.5 x 24.9 cm	2 co 32 ro	Zlomky staroslovanského breviáře pocházející z emauzského kláštera (includes the Svatotomášský zlomek breviáře, the Úryvek z chorvatsko-hlaholského misálu, the Moscow Glagolitic fragment of Saint Thomas Breviary). The Svatotomášský zlomek (1/14), the badly damaged 1/8 and the fragment in the Музейное собрание (ф. 178) were all part of the same original codex. 1/14 was used as the cover of a student notebook from 1623 to 1629. The Moscow fragment was used as the cover of a German book. 1/14 was discovered by Alois tonder in 1900 in the Augustinian monastery on Malá Strana in Prague. 1/8 was discovered by the time of Milčetić 1911, and nothing is known about its history prior to its first description. The Moscow fragment was first described in 1984. Facsimile of 1/8 in Čermak 2020. Bibliography:	
fourfold gospel		1300s (late)	No 11	Čajniče	Bosnia	167			Čajniče Gospel (Čajničko evanđelje). Cyrillic with mixed Glagolitic paratext, John 15.17-20 on f. 89v-90r. Text at ANU BiH. Bibliography:	1959
breviary	Fg(Br)Apost	1300s (late)	Fragm. glag. 54	Arhiv HAZU	Croatia	1			Dvolist apostola (brevijara). Photograph of one page published in Štefanić 1970. Microfilms and photocopy in Zagreb by 1977.	IzSt
breviary	Fg(Br)Dub_{2}	1300s (late)		Arhiv HAZU		1			Drugi dubašljanski odlomak brevijara.	
breviary	BrLab_{1} (BrBer_{1})	1300s (late)	Ms 161 (C 161a/2)	NUK	Croatia	180	32 x 22 cm		First Ljubljana breviary (Prvi ljubljanski brevijar). From Beram in Istria. Acquired by NUK from library of Žiga Zois. Black and white photocopy made by 1977 (Star. inst. F 46), microfilm by 1978 (Star. inst. M 57, HDA G-112 (ZM 66/1). Bibliography:	DSK (22 December 2014), NSK, GHR, IzSt (2008), IzSt (2017 from NUK)
missal	MKop	1300s (late)	NY kongelig Samling 41 b, 2 o	Royal Library, Denmark	Roč (found there 1499)	263	29.5 x 19 cm		Copenhagen missal (Kopenhagenski misal). Written in Roč or for sv. Jelene in Nugla (which purchased Novak's Missal). First reported by Svane in 1965. Description. Microfilm FILM br. 10/3 made by 1978 at Državni arhiv u Karlovcu (and copy G-46 (ZM 57/7 at HDA), photocopy F 155 made 1980 at Staroslavenski institut. Bibliography:	
rule	RegBen	1300s (end)	I a 74 (Kuk. Cod. Glag. X)	Arhiv HAZU		60	17.2 x 12.8 cm		Regula svetoga Benedikta (Rule of Saint Benedict). The only surviving Rule of Saint Benedict in the Glagolitic tradition. Written for the Rogovska opatija, which retained its name after moving in 1129 from the mainland near Biograd na More to Tkon on Pašman. It may have been copied from an original from the 12th century. It was probably written during the abbacy of the Petar who reigned 1364–1380. The earliest dated note is from 1406. Facsimile by Ostojić. Photograph of one page published in Štefanić 1970. Bibliography:	
breviary		1300s (end)	Fragm. glag. 17	Arhiv HAZU		2	28.2 x 22.2 cm		Dvolist brevijara. Discovered in Grdoselo (Pazin). Given by Jakov Volčić chaplain in Kastav through M. Sabljar to Kukuljević.	
breviary		1300s (end)	Fragm. glag. 32/a	Arhiv HAZU		2	23.5 x 18.7 cm		Dvolist brevijara. Likely written by a Franciscan. Acquired by JAZU from Fanfoni family library of Zadar.	IzSt (2008)
breviary		1300s (end)	Fragm. glag. 54	Arhiv HAZU		2	34.8 x 28 cm		Dvolist apostola (brevijara). Once used as cover of Ivanićka povelja. Acquired by Kukuljević from the Arkiv Nadbiskupije zagrebačke where it had arrived by the 18th century. The fragment is significant for its text.	
breviary		1300s (end)	Fragm. glag. 75	Arhiv HAZU		1	24 x 20.8 cm		List brevijara.	
breviary	BrOxf	1300s (end)	Ms. Canon. Lit. 172	Bodleian Library	Croatia	410	15 x 10.2 cm	2 co x 28 ro	Oxfordski brevijar (Oxford breviary). It includes a missal and a Roman Ritual. There is a date 1310 at the end, which Tadin takes as genuine, but which Vajs and du Feu dismiss as a late addition. Cyrillic "у" in the insertion умислиш on f. 244r and possibly some Cyrillic initials. Acquired together with the Canonici collection in 1817. Canonici acquired them in Italy. Microfilm in Zagreb by 1952. Bibliography:	DB, IzSt
breviary		1300s (end)	Berčićevo sobranje fragmenata I, 37, 38, 39, 40	Petersburg (гос. публ. библиотека)		4	25 x 19 cm	2 co 37 ro		IzSt (2008; on 482–490)
breviary	Fg(Br)Hlv (Fg(Br)Liv)	1300s (last decades)		Livno (Arhiv Franjevačkoga samostana sv. Petra i Pavla na Gorici)		1	25.8 x 18.8 cm	2 co 34 ro	Livno Breviary Fragment (Livanjski fragment brevijara). Discovered by Josip Hamm in 1950 along with the Fojnički fragment brevijara. Found in the Franciscan monastery in Livno, where it was being used as the cover of a copy of the 1670 Dikcionar of Habdelić. It was separated from the cover by Hamm. Restored 1998 in the Hrvatski državni arhiv. Bibliography:	2008 (2008) [low res.], IzSt (2008)
missal		1300s	Berčićevo sobranje fragmenata II, 92-105	Petersburg (гос. публ. библиотека)		14	30 x 22 cm	2 co 27 ro	Zadarski odlomci misala. Discovered by Berčić in Zadar. Photocopies in Zagreb made 1985.	IzSt (2008; on 127–154)
missal		1300s	Ms 2048	NUK		1			Misal (ned. 10. in 11. po Duh.).	DSK
missal		1300s	Ms 2050	NUK		1			Misal (ned. 18, 19 in 20 po Duhov.).	DSK
breviary		1300s	Ms 2049	NUK		2			Brevir (2. in 5. ned. po epifaniji).	DSK
missal		1300s	Berčićevo sobranje fragmenata II, 59, 60	Petersburg (гос. публ. библиотека)		1	19 x 14 cm		Odlomak. Contains Gospel of Mark.	IzSt (2008; on 218–221)
breviary		1300s	Berčićevo sobranje fragmenata I, 103-108	Petersburg (гос. публ. библиотека)		6	23.3 x 14.5 cm	2 co 36 ro	Dvolist. Acquired by Berčić in Kukljica on 12 June 1863 from Marcelić.	IzSt (2008; on 369–376)
breviary		1300s	Berčićevo sobranje fragmenata I, 121 (old 198), 122 (old 199)	Petersburg (гос. публ. библиотека)		2	13.7 x 10.6 cm	2 co	Script unusually small. Blackened by smoke. Discovered in Žman.	IzSt (2008; on 346–348)
breviary		1300s	Berčićevo sobranje fragmenata II, 9, 9A	Petersburg (гос. публ. библиотека)		4			Odlomak dvolista brevijara.	IzSt (2008; on 320–321)
		1300s?	XIV B 6 (inv. br. 5337)	Rijeka (Naučna biblioteka)		3			Tri ostriška. Once attached to the 1609 book Andreae Fachinei Controversiarum iuris libri decem.	
note		1300s/1400s	XIII F 15	Prague (National Library)					Prokop signature in XIII F 15, at the end. Scribe: Prokop. Manuscript contains texts by Saint Augustine and Isodore of Seville, and was written by 1375. Script is similar to that of the 1395 Reims Gospel and 1 D c 1/30, as well as the earlier portions of the Czech Glagolitic Bible, as opposed to the later portions of the Czech Glagolitic Bible (around 1416). Discovered by Michal Dragoun (the 1906 Truhlář catalogue makes no mention of Glagolitic in its description of this manuscript, nor for XIII D 9).	NLP
note		1300s/1400s	XIII D 9	Prague (National Library)					Prokop signature in XIII D 9, on f. 200v. Scribe: Prokop. Manuscript contains various theological texts. Discovered by Michal Dragoun.	
note		1300s/1400s			Prague (Emmaus Monastery)				Latinic but with a Glagolitic note (with some Latin letters mixed) on f. 90 of a Copiario Diplomatum of the Emmaus Monastery. Facsimile in Dobrovsky 1782. Lost since then (either the entire codex or the page containing the Glagolitic note).	
missal		1300s/1400s	R 7843	NSK	Croatia	1	29.8 x 21.2 cm		Glagoljski misal-ulomak.	NSK – correct scan?
missal		1300s/1400s	I B 20	Rijeka (Naučna biblioteka)		2	33 x 22 cm (before reuse)		Once used as cover for copy of 1601 book Il regno de gli Slavi by Mavro Orbini. Includes a note of ownership A Iulio de Benzoniis S. R. I. E. et Regio Assessore Guberniali dono datus Magnifico Publico Fluminensi anno 1779.	
missal	Fg(M)Polj (FgPoljak)	1300s/1400s		Karlobag					Poljak Fragment (Poljakov fragment). Saved from being burned for heating in 1976 by Željko Poljak. Found in use as cover for books dated 1603 and 1707 bound together. First studied by Sandra Sudec.	
missal	Fg(M)Kas	1300s/1400s	2° Ms. philol. 14	Kassel University Library		7			Kassel fragment. Described by Becker in 1981.	KUL
missal		1300s/1400s		Škofja Loka (Capuchin Monastery)				2 co	Used as cover of sign. Q 4 (a book printed 1686). Arrived at Škofja Loka from the Capuchin Monastery in Kranj, probably after that monastery was abolished in 1786. In 1999, brother Bono Zvonimir Šagi was informed by brother Angel Kralj that the library of the Capuchin Monastery in Škofja Loka in Slovenia had books wrapped in Glagolitic. They were first examined in 2002 by Anica Vlašić-Anić.	
missal		1300s/1400s		Škofja Loka (Capuchin Monastery)				2 co	Used as cover of sign. R 54 (a book printed 1689). First examined in 2002 by Anica Vlašić-Anić.	
missal or breviary		1300s/1400s		Škofja Loka (Capuchin Monastery)				2 co	Used as cover of sign. N 4 (a book "Ritus induendi fratres et sorores / tertij ordinis"). In 1999, brother Bono Zvonimir Šagi was informed by brother Angel Kralj that the library of the Capuchin Monastery in Škofja Loka in Slovenia had books wrapped in Glagolitic. They were first examined in 2002 by Anica Vlašić-Anić.	
missal		1300s/1400s		NSK	Croatia	1	20 x 22 cm	2 co 31 ro	Odlomak misala.	NSK, GHR
missal		1300s/1400s	R 3753	NSK	Croatia	1+2	20.3 x 14.5 cm	2 co	Ulomak misala (Ulomak Muke).	NSK
missal		1300s/1400s	Fragm. glag. 124	Arhiv HAZU		1	23 x 16.3 cm	2 co 30 ro	List misala. Text includes Epistle to Timothy and Wisdom of Solomon. Used as cover of Molitvenik with sign. VIII 162 until 1960. Acquired by JAZU from remains of Jerko Gršković of Vrbnik.	
missal		1300s/1400s	Fragm. glag. 69	Arhiv HAZU	Zadar region?	2	28 x 19.6 cm	2 co 32 ro	Dvolist misala. Mentions Vicent and Krsogon, whose cult centre was Zadar. Parchment.	
missal		1300s/1400s	Fragm. glag. 66	Arhiv HAZU		2	26 x 17.3 cm	2 co 34 ro	Dva lista misala. Once used as cover of Glagolitic manuscript of Regula Sv. Benedikta with sign. I a 74, purchased by Kukuljević 1853 in Rogovo, who removed these folia. On f. 2 there is an 18th-century note by don Ive Torić of Vrgada while he was a monk on Tkon and a date 1726 mentioned. Earlier don Jive Gaćina wrote a note 24 June 1722 upon his entry into the monastery on Tkon. Folio 1 also features a 1710? note. And there are notes by a young hand practicing writing.	
missal		1300s/1400s	Fragm. glag. 49	Arhiv HAZU		1	22 x 14.5 cm	2 co 28 ro	List misala. Text is Matthew 27:40-66 and corresponding mass. Includes note by pop Matij Repčić. Once used as the cover of Glagolitic manuscript of Antun Franki of Omišalj sign. III a 5. Parchment.	
missal		1300s/1400s	Fragm. glag. 40	Arhiv HAZU		1	31.2 x 21.8 cm		List misala. Parchment. In Novi Vinodolski monastery library 1630, 1631. Acquired by Kukuljević in Novi.	
missal		1300s/1400s		Krk (arhiv bivšeg Staroslavenskog instituta)		2	34 x 23.5 cm	2 co	Dvolist misala. Once used as a book wrapper.	
missal		1300s/1400s		Krk (arhiv bivšeg Staroslavenskog instituta)		1	29 x 22 cm	2 co	List brevijara. Includes Proprium sanctorum. Once used as a wrapper for Glagolitic notebook "Polica od dugi mene popa Ivana Volarića" 1765–1766.	
missal		1300s/1400s	1 D c 1/25	Prague (National Museum)	Croatia	3	20.5 x 14 cm	1 co 30 ro	Zlomky chorvatsko-hlaholského misálu. Includes a bifolium A and a folio B. Discovered by 1861 by Pavel Josef Šafařík in the cover of a copy of the 1660 Adrianczkoga Mora Sirena, though it had previously been bound into a book used in at least 1629 because of a note with that date on it.	
ritual		1300s (second half)	1 D c 1/2 (A-C)	Prague (National Museum)	Croatia/Prague	3	24 x 3.5-6.5 cm	2 co 30 ro	Zlomky charvátskohlaholského rituálu. Circumstances of discovery are unknown but it was by the time of the writing of Milčetić 1911, probably in the late 19th century. Photograph of 1 side in Čermak 2020. Bibliography:	
breviary		1300/1400s	VI B 2	Rijeka (Sveučilišna knjižnica)		4			Dva krnja dvolista brevijara. Once in the a cover of a 1639 Gregorio Tholosano, Coloniae Allobrogum. Lost by around 2000.	
breviary	Fg(Br)Smb_{1}	1300s/1400s	in a frame on the library wall	Samobor (Samostan Uznesenja BDM)		2		2 co 21 ro	Prvi samoborski glagoljski fragment brevijara. Contains Psalms 28–34 with antiphones. Discovered in the 1990s but already framed and on the wall. Bibliography:	1996 (2006)
missal		1300s/1400s	OR 73	Knjižnica Staroslavenskog instituta		1			Contains the portion for the 2nd day of Saint Paul. Used in the cover of a 1654–1713 parish register of the župa sv. Ivana Krstitelja in Nova Ves (Zagreb). It was relatively recently discovered. It was removed from the cover by Tatjana Ribkin in the Arhiv Hrvatske at their building on Savska cesta 131. It was given to the Knjižnica Staroslavenskog instituta y the prebendar zagrebački Milutin Juranić. Photocopy at Staroslavenski institut (F 365) made before 1995.	
		1300s/1400s	VI B 2	Rijeka (Sveučilišna knjižnica)		1			Ostrižak glagoljičkoga štiva. Not discovered at the time of Štefanić 1953 because the breviary fragment VI B 2 had not yet been removed from the book it was used for. Lost by around 2000.	
breviary		1300s/1400s	Ms 2045	NUK		2			Brevir. Parchment manuscript with fragment of paper printed calendar from the same cover.	DSK
breviary		1300s/1400s	Ms 2046	NUK		1			Brevir (Propria sanctorum?)	DSK
breviary	Fg(Br)Ant	1300s/1400s	C 404	Slovak National Library (or Literárny archív of Matica slovenska in Martin)	Croatia	2	31.7 x 21.5 cm		Svätoantonský zlomok (Báčský zlomok, Fragment iz Svetoga Antona). Written on goat parchment according to the Brinckova study. Photocopies in Zagreb made 1984. Bibliography: Used as cover for a 17th-century book. Discovered by Gajdoš in the Franciscan monastery in Sv. Anton (today Báč).	WDL
breviary		1300s/1400s		Vrbnik (župni ured)	Vrbnik	1	35.5 x 26 cm	2 co 28 ro	List brevijara. Contains Galatians 5:13-6:16. Includes note from 1475 and note from 1560. Parchment.	
breviary		1300s/1400s		Košljun		2	20.2 x 13.2 cm	2 co	Nepotpun dvolist brevijara. Once used as a book cover. Photocopy by 1977 (F 43) and microfilm by 1978 (M 48) kept at Staroslavenski institut.	
breviary		1300s/1400s		NSK	Croatia	2	31 x 23 cm	2 co	Ulomak brevijara.	NSK, GHR
breviary		1300s/1400s	Fragm. glag. 7/a-b	Arhiv HAZU		1	17.7 x 12.6 cm		Dva komada lista brevijara. Kukuljević obtained them from the cover of a 16th-century manuscript of the Life of Saint Bernard he obtained in Vrbnik.	
breviary		1300s/1400s	Fragm. glag. 7/c-d	Arhiv HAZU		2			Dva ostriška brevijara. Kukuljević obtained them from the cover of one of the manuscripts in his collection.	
breviary		1300s/1400s	Fragm. glag. 55	Arhiv HAZU		1			List brevijara. Kukuljević obtained it from the cover of the 1692 christenings register of Grižane.	
breviary (psalter)		1300s/1400s	Fragm. glag. 67	Arhiv HAZU		1	22/4 x 16 cm		List brevijara (psaltira). Kukuljević obtained it from the cover of the 1507 printed book Mirakuli slavne deve Marie.	
breviary		1300s/1400s	Fragm. glag. 76 (old 13, 56, 76)	Arhiv HAZU		4+			Odlomci brevijara. Includes a 15.5 x 19 cm dvolist (76a), a 16 x 20.8 cm dvolist (76b), 5 small strips 5 x 5 cm at largest (76c). Obtained by Kukuljević in Rijeka, possibly in the Capuchin Monastery. Photograph of one page published in Štefanić 1970.	
breviary	Fg(Br)Ri_{2}	1300s (late) / 1400s (early)	Fragm. glag. 13 (old 13, 76)	Arhiv HAZU		2	15.5 x 19 cm, 16 x 20.8 cm	2 co	Riječki odlomak glagoljskog brevijara. Contains parts of Jeremiah, Cry of Jeremiah and John and a homily of saint Augustine. Acquired by Kukuljević at Capuchin Monastery in Rijeka. Parchment.	
epistolary		1300s/1400s	No. 55	SANU Library	Serbia				Cyrillic with Glagolitic (of the type matching 12th-13th century works in round script) and Greek employed as copyist notation on i.e. f. 48, f. 50, f. 55. Facsimiles in Archiv für slavische Philologie XXII, 512–513.	
abecedary	AbGig (DAbc)	1385–1409 (abecedary)	A 148	National Library of Sweden	Bohemia	1			Stokholm Abecedarium (Divišova abeceda, Azbukva Ogromne knjige). Glagolitic abecedary in Codex Gigas. Folio 1v only. Abecedary written by a certain abbot Divišъ. The codex was originally in the Benedictine monastery in Podlažice, then from the end of the 12th century to the beginning of the Hussite Wars it was in the Břevnov Monastery. A photography was first published in Baecklund 1942, then in Pacnerová 1989, then Marti 1991. But there were reproductions before Baecklund. Bibliography:	WDL
		1300s/1400s	Fragm. glag. 70	Arhiv HAZU		1	24 x 14 cm	2 co 32 ro	Odlomak iz Raja duše Alberta Velikoga. Likely acquired by Kukuljević. Photograph of one page published in Štefanić 1970.	
calendar		1300s/1400s	Fragm. glag. 118	Arhiv HAZU		1	20.2 x 15.7 cm		List kalendara. Includes Latinic note by Jure Jerić/Jurić in Latinic from the end of the 17th century. Once used as a cover of the Ivana Oštarić homiliary (VII 31).	
		1300s/1400s	R 4584	NSK		3			Glagoljski ostrišci.	
	FgPrag_{x}	1300s/1400s	XVII.J.17/6	National Library of the Czech Republic		1	1,5 x 2,5 cm, 2,5 x 4,5 cm, 8,5 x 6 cm		Hlaholské zlomky. Codex fragments.	NLP
