= Codex Gigas =

13th-century manuscript compendium

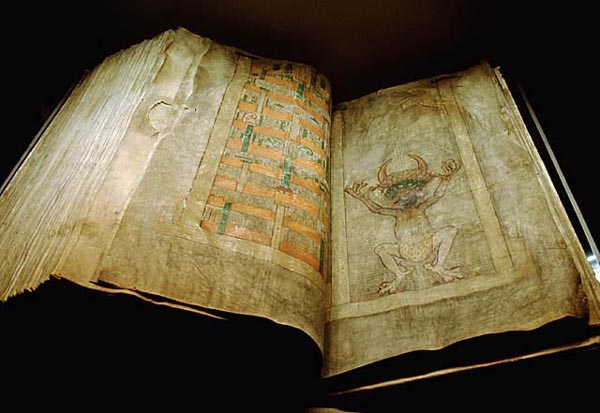
The Codex Gigas opened to the page with the distinctive portrait of the Devil from which the text received its byname, the Devil's Bible.

The Codex Gigas (lit. 'giant book'; Czech: Obří kniha) is the largest extant medieval illuminated manuscript in the world, at a length of 92 cm (36 in). It is a Romanesque Latin Bible, with other texts, some secular, added in the second half of the book. Very large illuminated Bibles were typical of Romanesque monastic book production, but even among these, the page size of the Codex Gigas is exceptional. The manuscript is also known as the Devil's Bible due to its highly unusual full-page portrait of Satan, the Devil, and the legend surrounding the book's creation. Apart from the page with an image of the Devil, the book is not very heavily illustrated with figurative miniatures, compared to other grand contemporary Bibles.

The manuscript was created in the early 13th century in the Benedictine monastery of Podlažice in Chrast, Bohemia, now a region in the Czech Republic. The manuscript contains the complete Latin Bible in the Vulgate version, as well as other popular works, all written in Latin. Between the Old and New Testaments is a selection of other popular medieval reference works: Flavius Josephus's Antiquities of the Jews and The Jewish War, Isidore of Seville's encyclopedia Etymologiae, the chronicle of Cosmas of Prague (Chronica Boemorum), and medical works: an early version of the Ars medicinae compilation of treatises, and two books by Constantine the African.

Eventually finding its way to the imperial library of Rudolf II, Holy Roman Emperor in Prague, the entire collection was taken as spoils of war by the Swedish Empire in 1648 during the Thirty Years' War, and the manuscript is now preserved at the National Library of Sweden in Stockholm, where it is on display for the general public.

== Description ==
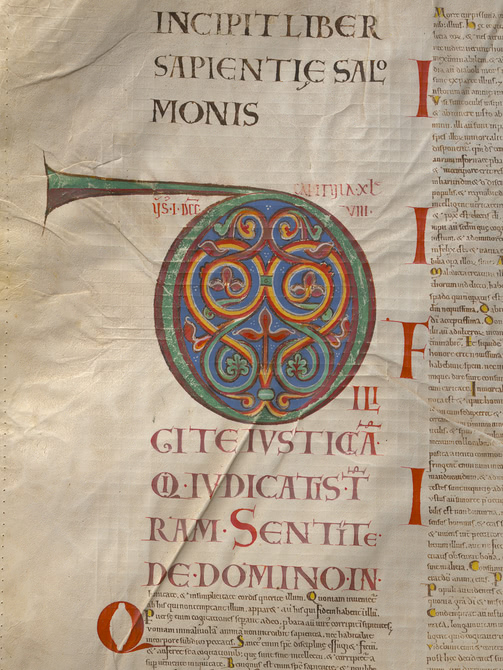
Illuminated initial at the start of the Wisdom of Solomon

The codex's bookbinding is wooden boards covered in leather, with ornate metal guards and fittings. At 92 cm (36 in) long, 50 cm (20 in) wide and 22 cm (8.7 in) thick, it is the largest known medieval manuscript. Weighing 74.8 kg (165 lb), Codex Gigas is composed of 310 leaves of vellum said to be made from the skins of 160 donkeys, or perhaps calfskin, covering 142.6 m^{2} (1,535 sq ft) in total. The manuscript includes illuminations in red, blue, yellow, green, and gold. Capital letters at the start of books of the bible and the chronicle are elaborately illuminated in several colours, sometimes taking up most of the page; 57 of these survive. The start of the Book of Genesis is missing. There are also 20 initials with blue letters and vine decorations in red. There are also two images representing Heaven and Earth during the Creation, as blue and green circles with respectively the sun, moon, and some stars, and a planet all of sea with no landmasses. Within books, major capitals are much enlarged, taking up the height of about five to six lines of text in red ink and placed in the margins. Less important divisions, such as the start of verses, are slightly enlarged within the text and highlighted with yellowish ink around the letter forms.

The codex has a unified look as the nature of the writing is unchanged throughout, showing no signs of age, disease, or mold on the part of the scribe. This may have led to the belief that the whole book was written in a very short time (see § Legend). Medieval epigraphers investigating the book estimate that it took over 20 years to transcribe, and the codex is now generally understood to have produced between 1204 and 1230.

The codex's extraordinary length, size, and detail have given rise to the legend that it was written by one scribe in one night with help from the Devil himself. It initially contained 320 sheets. However, twelve of these were subsequently removed. It is unknown who removed the pages or for what purpose.

=== Illustration of the Devil ===
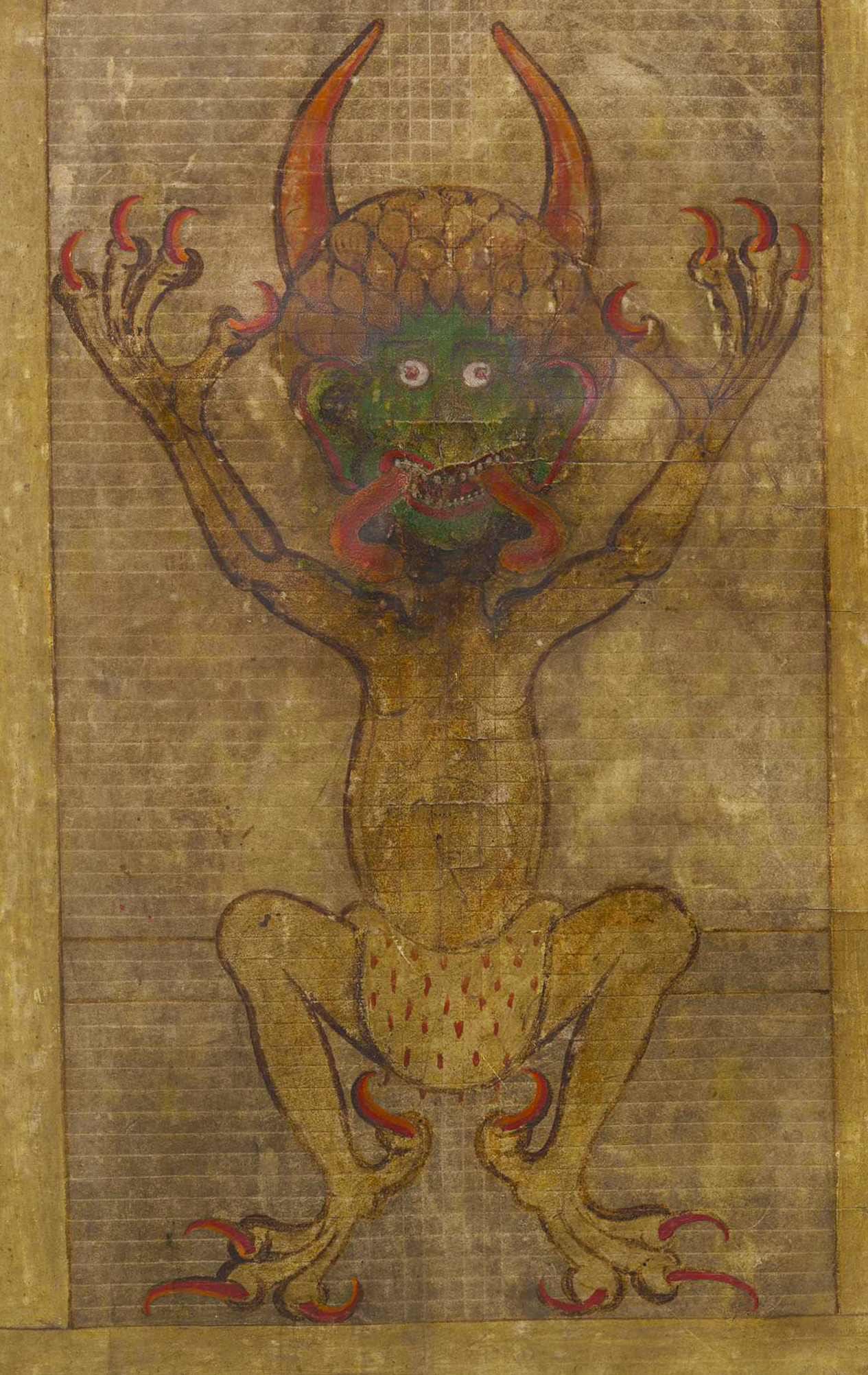
Illustration of the Devil on Codex Gigas, early thirteenth century

Folio 290 recto, otherwise empty, includes a full-page portrait of Satan, the Devil, about 50 cm (20 in) tall. Directly opposite the Devil is a full page depiction of the Kingdom of Heaven, thus juxtaposing contrasting images of Good and Evil as Christian symbols. The Devil is shown frontally, crouching with arms uplifted in a dynamic posture. He wears a white loincloth with small comma-shaped red dashes, which have been interpreted as the tails of ermine furs, a common symbol of sovereignty. He has no tail, and his body, arms, and legs are of relatively normal human proportions. His hands and feet end with only four fingers and toes each, terminating in large claws; his claws and large horns are red.

He has a large, dark green head, and his hair forms a skull cap of dense curls. The eyes are wide open, small, with red pupils, and his red-tipped ears are large. His open mouth reveals his small white teeth, and two long red tongues protrude from the corners of his mouth. The double tongues evoke the forked tongue of a serpent, a common association with Satan in Christian iconography and demonology since biblical times.

Several pages before this double spread are written in yellow characters on a blackened parchment and have a very gloomy character, somewhat different from the rest of the codex. The discoloration is because these vellum pages have been exposed to the light as readers turned the pages toward the infamous illustration over the centuries.

== History ==
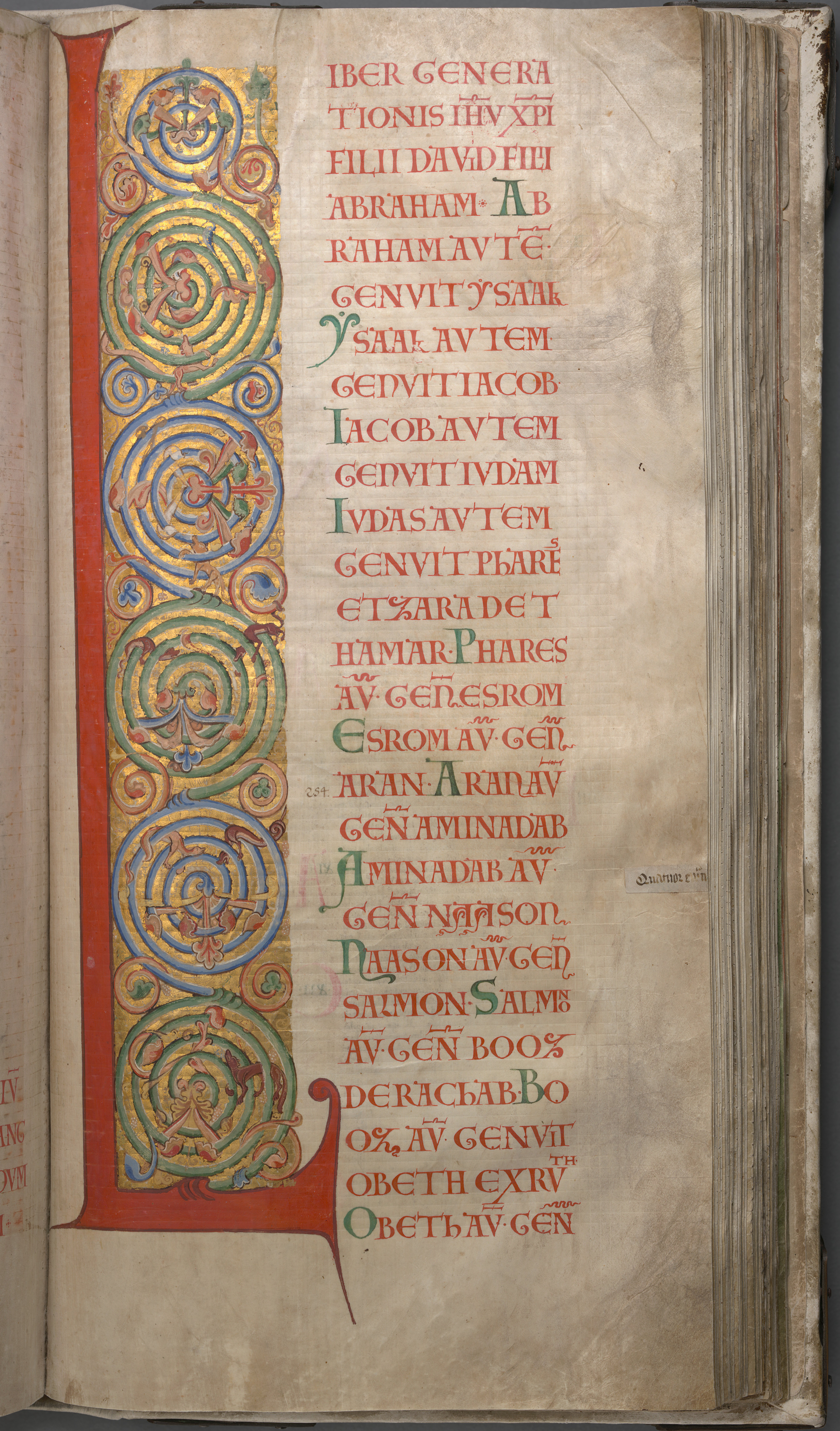
Opening of the Gospel of Matthew

According to legend, the codex was created by Herman the Recluse in the Benedictine monastery of Podlažice near Chrast in Bohemia (modern-day Czech Republic), which was destroyed in the 15th century during the Hussite Revolution, but is now marked by a maquette in the town museum of Chrast. Records in the codex end in the year 1222. Shortly after it was written, the codex was pawned by the Benedictines to the Cistercian monks of the Sedlec Abbey, today a former Catholic monastery renowned for housing the Sedlec Ossuary, where it remained for 70 years. The Benedictine monastery in Břevnov reclaimed the codex around the end of the 13th century. From 1477 it was kept in the library of a monastery in Broumov, until in 1594 it was taken to Prague into the personal collection of the Holy Roman Emperor Rudolf II.

At the end of the Thirty Years' War in 1648, the entire collection was taken as war booty by the Swedish Army. From 1649 onwards, the manuscript has been kept in the Swedish Royal Library in Stockholm.

On 7 May 1697, a fire at the Tre Kronor royal castle in Stockholm destroyed much of the Swedish Royal Library. The Codex Gigas was saved by being thrown out of a window; according to the vicar Johann Erichsons, it landed on and injured a bystander.

A National Geographic documentary included interviews with manuscript experts who argued that certain evidence (handwriting analysis and a credit to Hermann Inclusus, i.e. "Herman the Recluse") indicates that the manuscript was the work of a single scribe.

== Content ==
The first page has two Hebrew alphabets. There are also added slips with Early Cyrillic and Glagolitic alphabets (Folio 1). About half of the codex (f. 1–118) consists of the entire Latin Bible in the Vulgate version, except for the books of Acts and Revelation, which are from a pre-Vulgate version. They are books of the Old Testament, in the following order: Genesis to Ruth; Isaiah; Jeremiah; Baruch; Lamentations; Daniel; Hosea to Malachi; Job; Samuel and Kings; Psalms to Song of Solomon; Wisdom of Solomon; Wisdom of Jesus (Sirach); Chronicles; Esdras; Tobit; Judith; Esther; and Maccabees. Apart from the alphabets at the start, the entire book is written in Latin.

The two works of Flavius Josephus follow (Antiquities of the Jews and The Jewish War) (f. 118–178). The first page of Josephus, which recounts the Genesis creation narrative, is illustrated in the margin with pictures of Heaven and Earth (f. 118v). These works are followed by Isidore of Seville's encyclopedia Etymologiae (f. 201–239), and the medical works (f. 240–252). Following a blank page, the New Testament commences with Gospel of Matthew to Acts of the Apostles, Epistle of James to Book of Revelation, and Epistle to the Romans to Epistle to the Hebrews (f. 253–286). This is followed by some pages with common prayers and a page of "three adjurations and two charms", some of them known from Jewish sources (f. 286–291). The full-page images of the Heavenly City and the Devil are on f. 289–90 of this section. Then comes the Chronica Boemorum of Cosmas of Prague (f. 294–304). A list of brothers in the Benedictine monastery of Podlažice, and a calendar with a necrology, magic formulae, the start of the introits for feasts, and other local records round out the codex. (f. 305–312).

== Legend ==
According to one version of a legend already recorded in the Middle Ages, the scribe was a Christian monk who broke his monastic vows and was sentenced to be walled up alive. To escape death, he promised to create, in one night, a book to glorify the monastery forever, including all human knowledge. Near midnight, he became so desperate that he prayed to Lucifer to help him finish the book in exchange for his soul. The Devil completed the manuscript, and the monk added the Devil's picture as a tribute. It has been verified by extensive handwriting analysis that it was written by one monk, but it is estimated to have been completed over the span of 20-30 years.

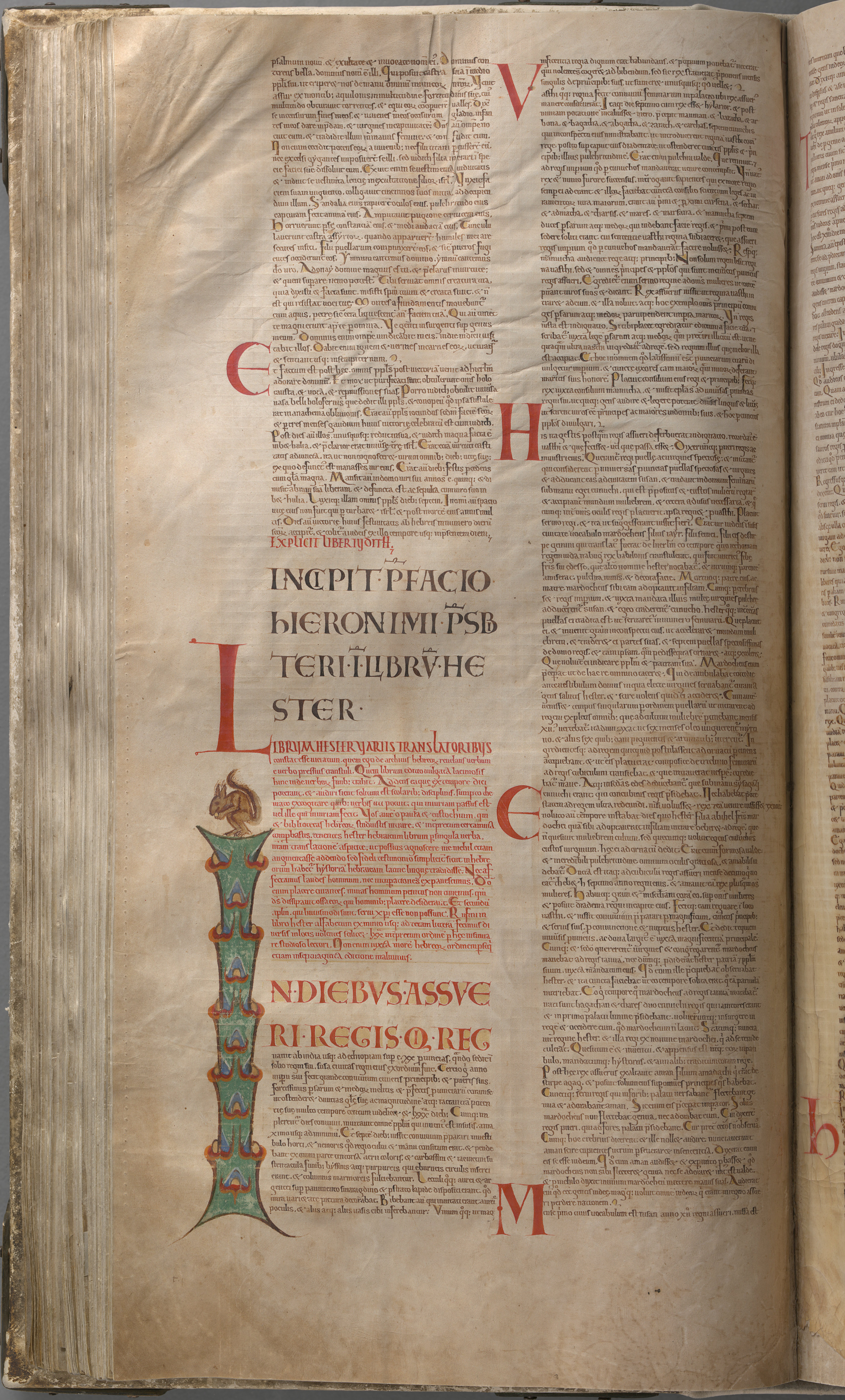
Initial with a squirrel

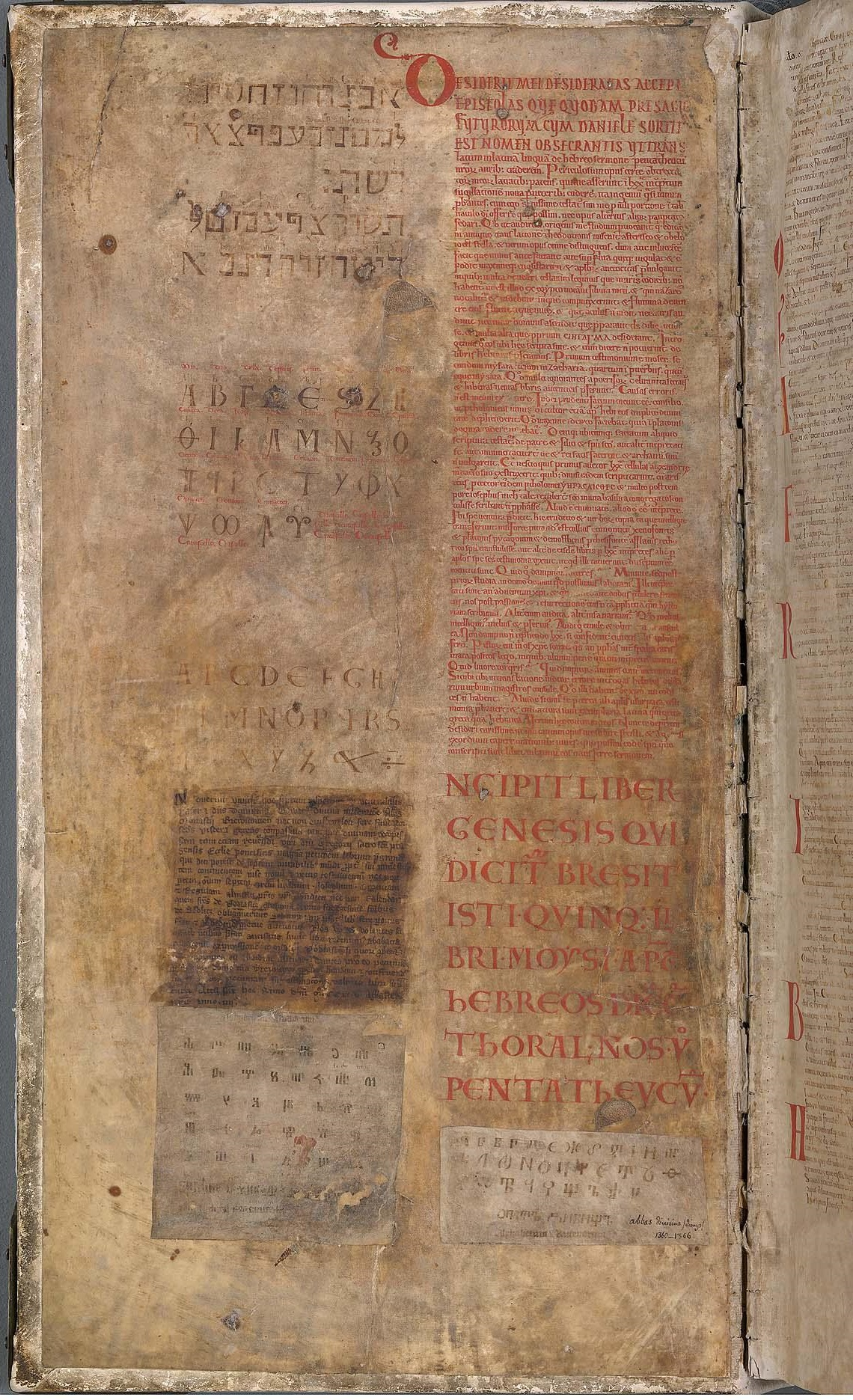
F1v, showing Hebrew, Greek, Latin, Glagolitic, and Old Cyrillic alphabets

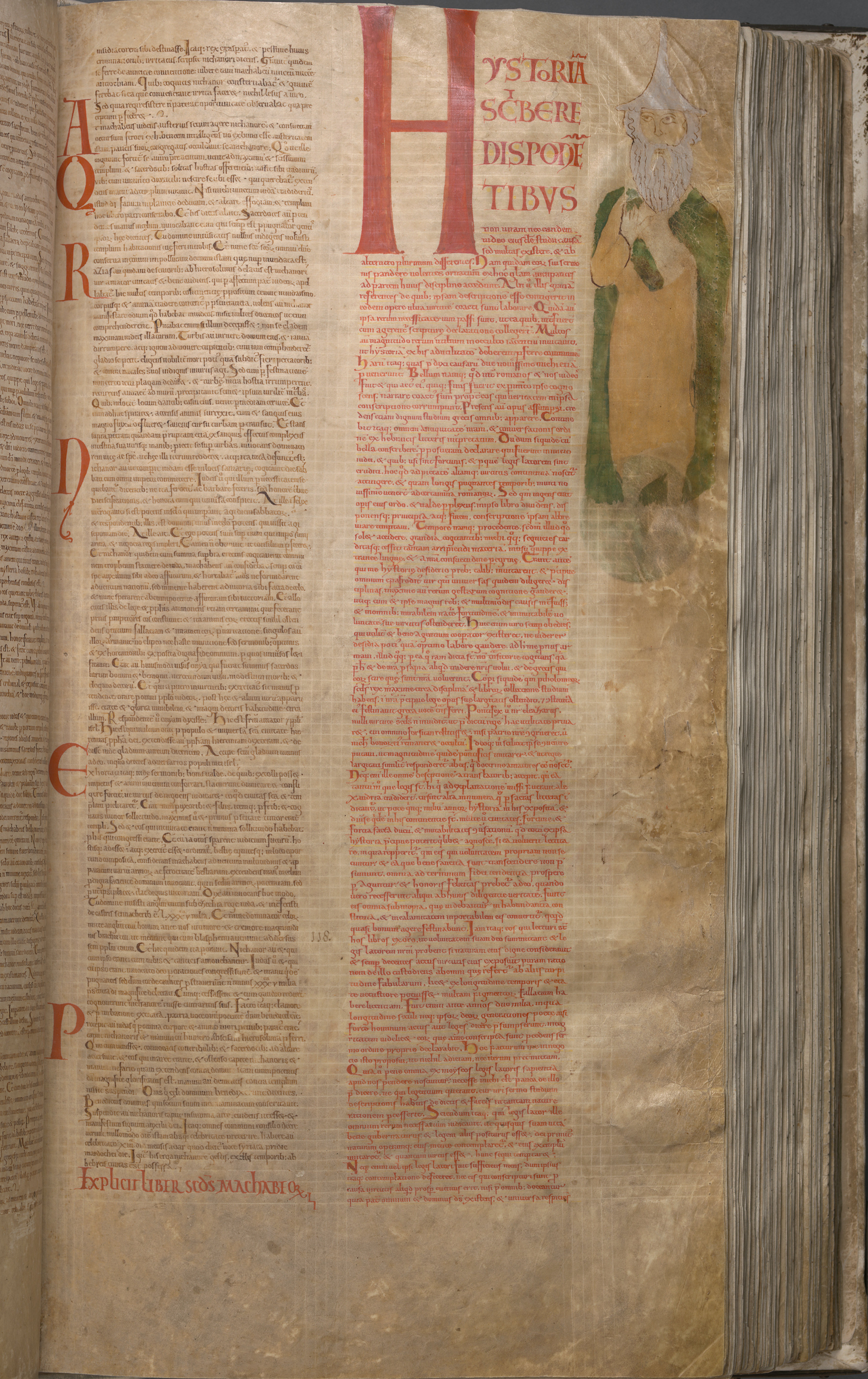
End of Book of Maccabees and start of Josephus, with author portrait

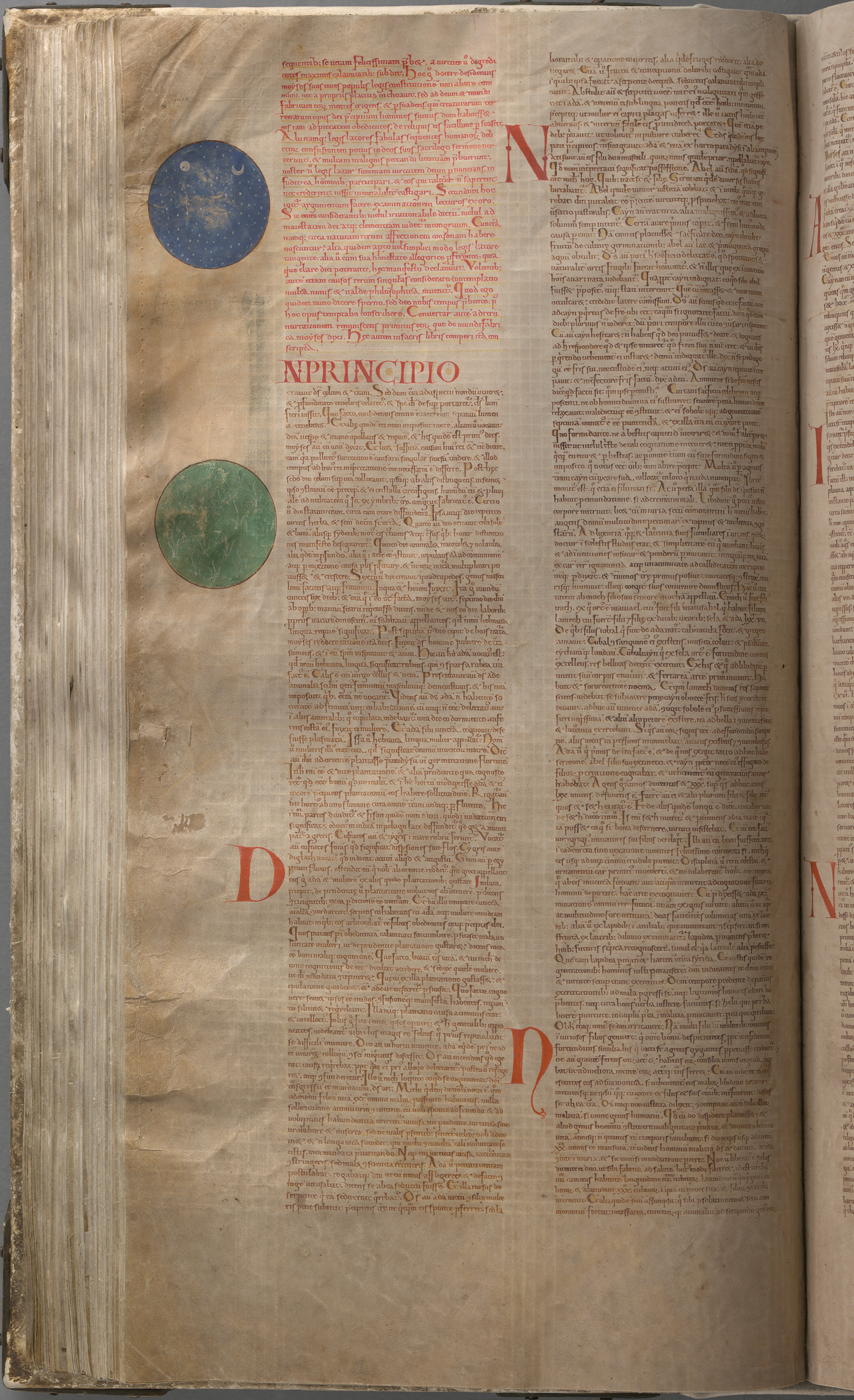
F118v, start of Josephus, Heaven and Earth

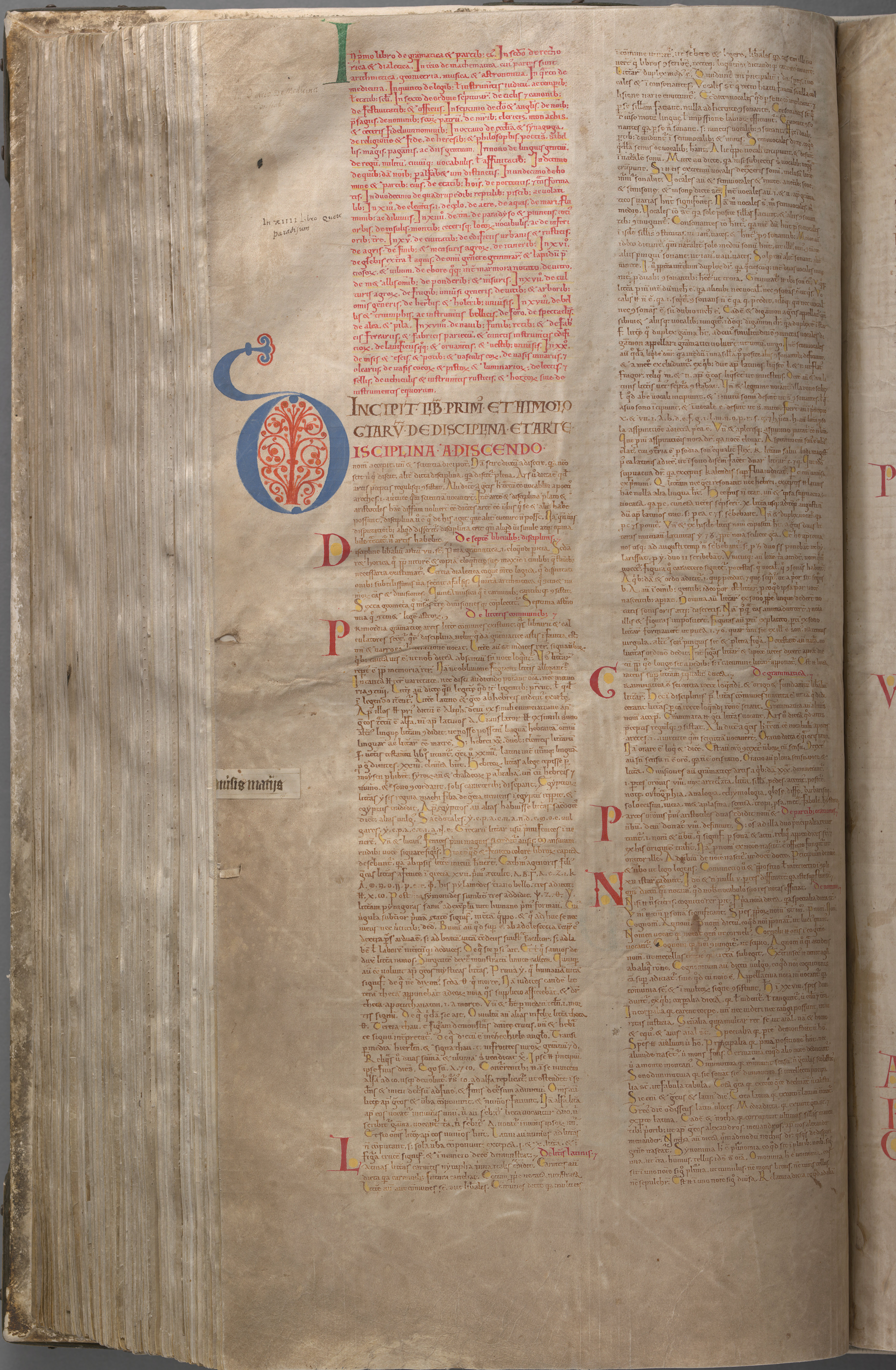
Blue and red capital in Isidore

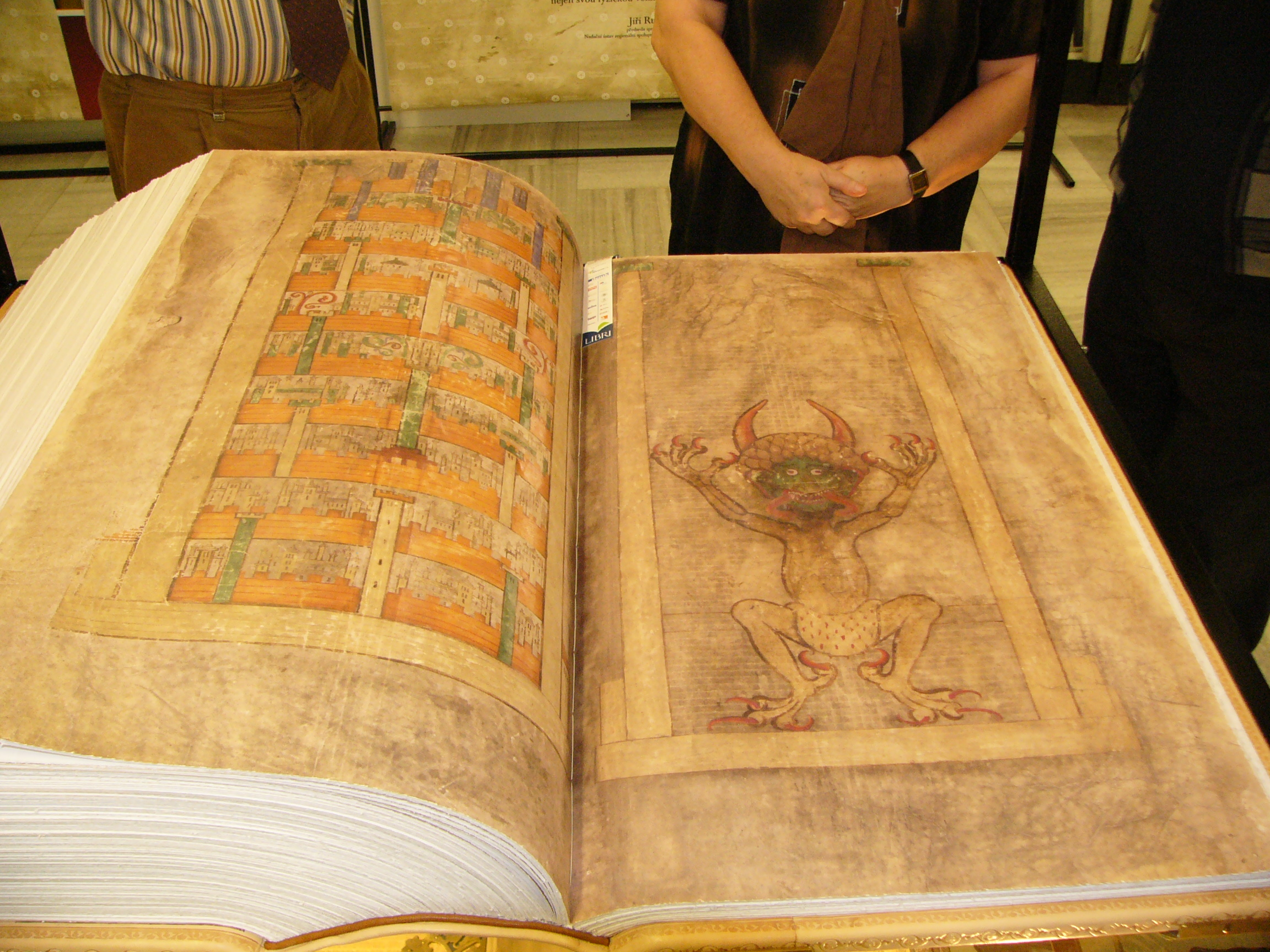
Viewing a facsimile in the Czech Republic

== See also ==
- List of Glagolitic manuscripts (1300–1399)
- Lists of Glagolitic manuscripts
- List of New Testament Latin manuscripts

== Bibliography ==
- Boldan, Kamil; Dragoun, Michal; Foltýn, Duan; Marek, Jindřich; Uhlíř Moiz, Zdeněk (2007). The Devil's Bible – Codex Gigas: The Secrets of the World's Largest Book. NKP. ISBN 978-80-7050-532-8.
