= Sofia Psalter =

14th century Bulgarian illuminated psalter

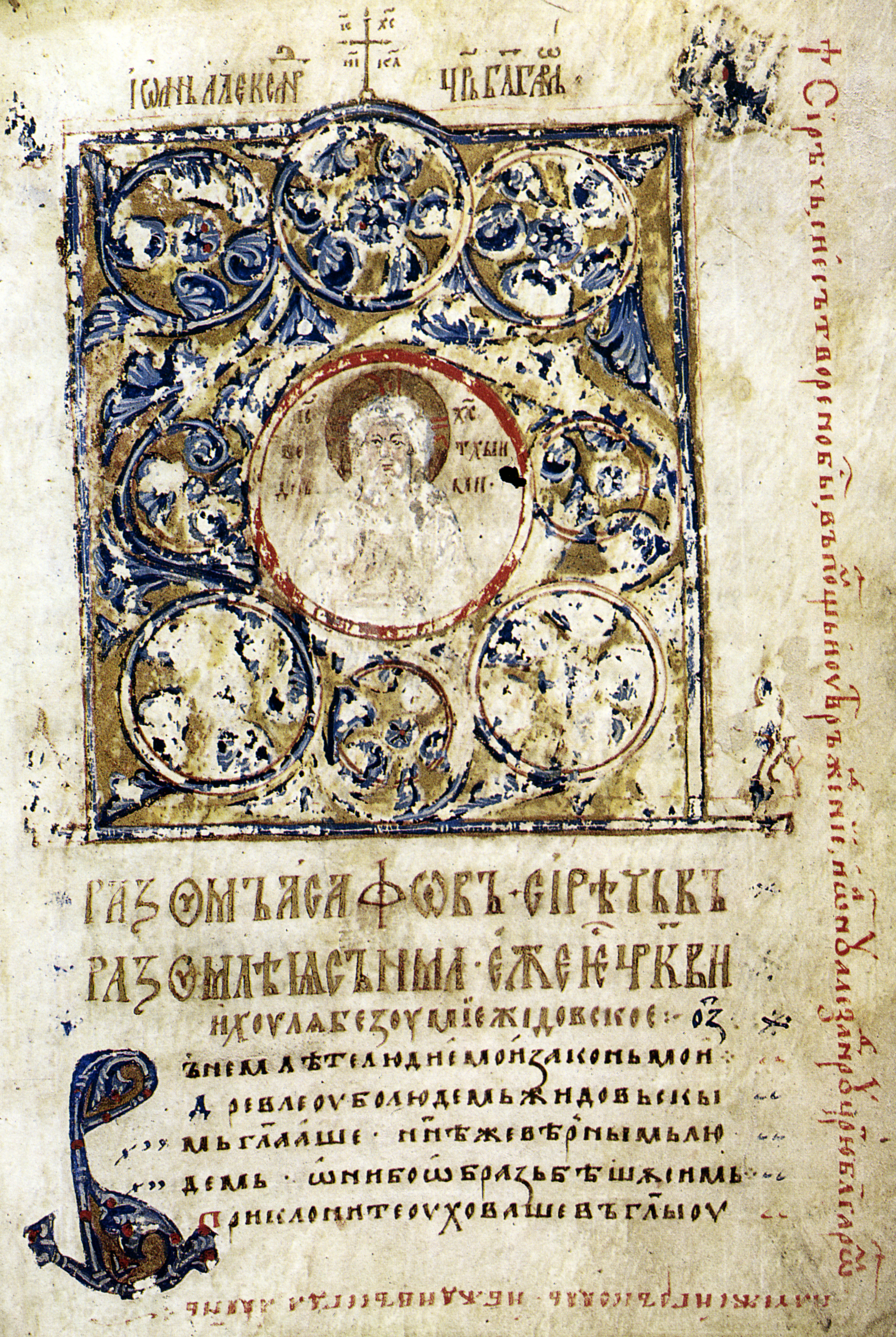
- Author: anonymous
- Original title: Софийски песнивец
- Language: Bulgarian
- Publication date: 1337
- Media type: ink and illumination on parchment
- Pages: 318
- Library of the Bulgarian Academy of Sciences

The Sofia Psalter (Bulgarian: Софийски песнивец, Sofiyski pesnivets), also known as Ivan Alexander's Psalter or the Kuklen Psalter, is a 14th-century Bulgarian illuminated psalter. It was produced in 1337 and belonged to the royal family of Tsar Ivan Alexander of Bulgaria.

== Analysis ==
The psalter, which consists of 318 parchment folios, is written in Middle Bulgarian Cyrillic and contains the text of the Psalms along with interpretation by Eusebius of Caesarea, as well as the Nicene Creed and an interpretation of the Lord's Prayer. Of particular importance is the Praise to Ivan Alexander, who ordered the manuscript, contained on folios 311a-312b.

The manuscript is part of the collection of the Library of the Bulgarian Academy of Sciences in Sofia.

== See also ==
- Gospels of Tsar Ivan Alexander, 1355–1356
- List of Glagolitic manuscripts (1300–1399)
- Lists of Glagolitic manuscripts
- Tomić Psalter, c. 1360
