= 2026 Croatia wildfires =

Statistics
- Total fires: 42 (30 ha or larger)
- Total area: 5,143 ha (51.43 km^{2}) (EFFIS); 9,646 ha (96.46 km^{2}) (CFA)

Impacts
- Deaths: 4
- Injuries: 43+
- Evacuated: 2500+

In 2026, many wildfires occurred across Croatia during the 2026 European heatwaves. As of August 15, over 5,143 ha (51.43 km^{2}) have been burnt, according to the European Forest Fire Information System, with 42 fires larger than 30 ha being recorded. According to the Croatian Firefighting Association, 9,646 ha (96.46 km^{2}) have been burnt as of August 12.

== June ==
From June 22 to June 25, three wildfires broke out on the island of Krk. The first was recorded on June 22 near Dobrinj, between the villages of Klimno and Šilo. Two days later, on June 24, also in the Dobrinj municipality, a new fire broke out near Sužan. A third fire broke out on June 25 in the Punat municipality. All three fires were quickly contained and extinguished, but a total of around 3,500 square meters was burned.

== July ==
On July 5, a fire broke out near Vinišće which spread towards the village, fueled by strong bora winds. Firefighters from the surrounding area quickly intervened and put the fire under control.

On July 11, a large fire broke out near the village of Blato on the island of Korčula. More than 100 firefighters from other counties were sent to help bring it under control. Overnight, rain fell which helped the firefighters, and the fire was brought under control by the evening of July 12.

== August ==
On August 11, a fire broke out in Vinišće, leaving the entire village without electricity. A total of 27 firefighters with 10 fire trucks took part in the response, and the fire was extinguished early on August 12.

On August 12, a fire broke out along the A3 highway in the area of Hrvatski Leskovac and spread to both sides of the road. A total of 13.5 hectares burned, and the fire was extinguished within three hours.

During the night of August 13, a large fire broke out on the island of Brač. A total of 250 hectares burned, and 106 firefighters with 31 vehicles took part in extinguishing it, assisted by four Canadair CL-415 aircraft. The fire was extinguished in the afternoon after 13 hours of firefighting.

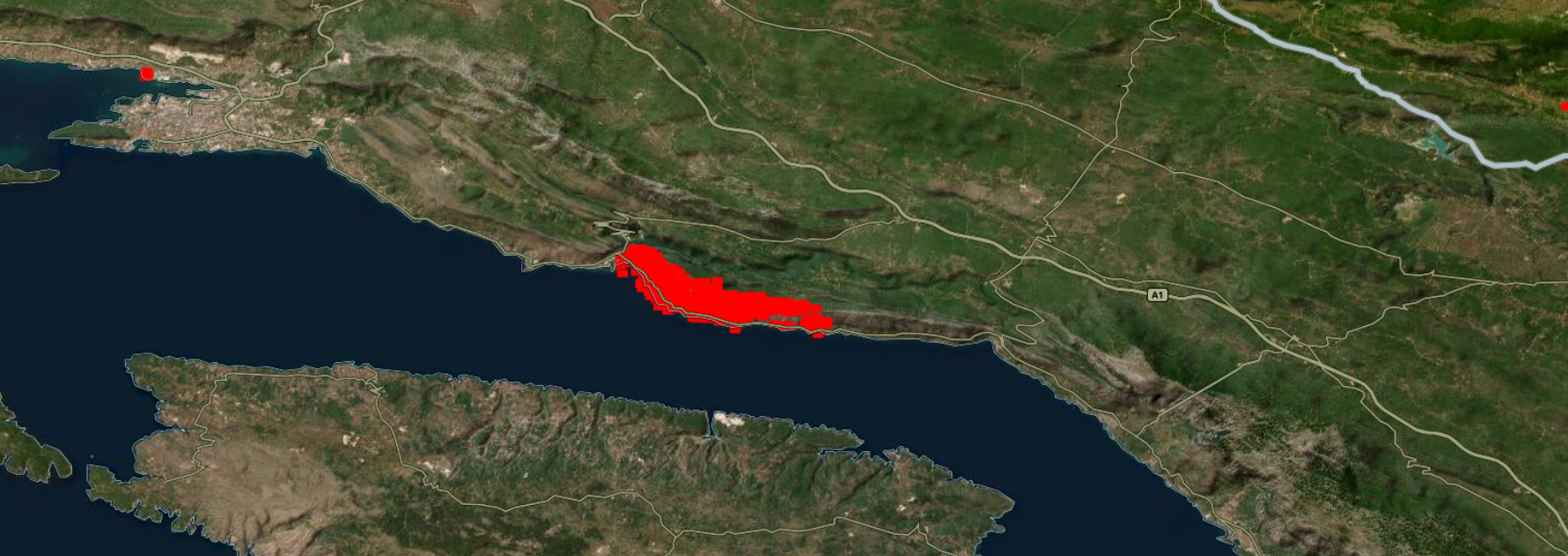
Satellite image of the fire that started in Lokva Rogoznica and spread to Omiš on August 14

On August 13, at 8:15 PM, the County Firefighting Operations Center of Split-Dalmatia County received a report of a fire in the area of Lokva Rogoznica. The fire quickly spread to Omiš, and a total of around 1,000 hectares of grass, low vegetation, and pine forest burned. Firefighters from 6 other counties took part in the response, totaling 253 firefighters with 83 fire vehicles, assisted by four Canadair CL-415 aircraft and four Air Tractors. In total, more than 300 firefighters were deployed. One person was killed in the fire, 43 people were injured along with three firefighters, and around 2,500 people were evacuated. The fire destroyed 58 residential buildings, two garages, 36 vehicles, 25 boats, two trailers, one motorcycle, and two cargo vehicles.

Early morning on August 14, a fire broke out in the area of Kuna Pelješka on the Pelješac peninsula. 250 firefighters with 73 fire vehicles from Dubrovnik-Neretva County, along with an extraordinary deployment of firefighters from two additional counties, took part in extinguishing the fire, assisted by four Canadair CL-415 aircraft, one Air Tractor, and one Mil Mi-17 helicopter. Around 500 hectares burned, and the fire was stopped early in the morning on August 16.

On August 14 at 9:40 AM, the County Firefighting Operations Center of Šibenik-Knin County detected a wildfire in the area of the settlement of Polača, which had spread into Croatia from Bosnia and Herzegovina. 37 firefighters with 19 fire vehicles were deployed to fight the fire, along with 26 members of the Croatian Army Firefighting Forces, assisted by four Canadair CL-415 firefighting aircraft.

In the afternoon on August 14, a fire broke out in the area of Ninski Stanovi and Žerava. 79 firefighters with 29 fire vehicles took part in extinguishing it, assisted by three Canadair CL-415 aircraft and one Air Tractor. Firefighting efforts were hampered by strong bora winds, but the fire was successfully brought under control by the evening.

On the evening of August 14, a fire broke out on Dugi Otok. 50 firefighters with 19 fire vehicles brought the fire under control on the afternoon of August 15, but it soon flared up again. Two Air Tractors and one Canadair CL-415 were also deployed. The fire was again brought under control in the evening. A total of 300 hectares of land burned.

On August 16, a fire broke out in the area of the village of Jovići. 56 firefighters with 17 fire vehicles took part in extinguishing it, assisted by three Canadair CL-415 firefighting aircraft and two Air Tractor AT-802 aircraft. The fire was brought under control at 7:30 PM.

== See also ==
- Wildfires in 2026
- 2026 Chernobyl exclusion zone wildfires
- 2026 Greece wildfires
- 2026 Italy wildfires
- 2026 France wildfires
- 2026 Spain wildfires
