= Omišalj =

- Municipality
- Omišalj Municipality; Općina Omišalj
- Location within Krk
- Coordinates: 45°12′43″N 14°33′15″E
- Country: Croatia
- Region: Primorje
- County: Primorje-Gorski Kotar County

Government
  - Mayor: Mirela Ahmetović (SDP)
  - City Council: 13 members: SDP (7); _; HDZ (2); _; Independents (1); _; HNS-ARS-AM-ŽZ (1); _; HL (1); _; Independents (1)

Area
  - Municipality: 36.5 km^{2} (14.1 sq mi)
  - Urban: 29.9 km^{2} (11.5 sq mi)

Population (2021)
  - Municipality: 2,992
  - Density: 82.0/km^{2} (212/sq mi)
  - Urban: 1,877
  - Urban density: 62.8/km^{2} (163/sq mi)
- Time zone: UTC+1 (CET)
  - Summer (DST): UTC+2 (CEST)
- Website: omisalj.hr

Omišalj is a coastal municipality in the north-west of the island of Krk in Croatia. The population of Omišalj itself is 1,887 (2021), while the municipality also includes the nearby village of Njivice, bringing the total population to 2,992. Omišalj is best known in modern times for hosting the Krk Bridge, the Rijeka Airport as well as Port of Rijeka oil terminal.

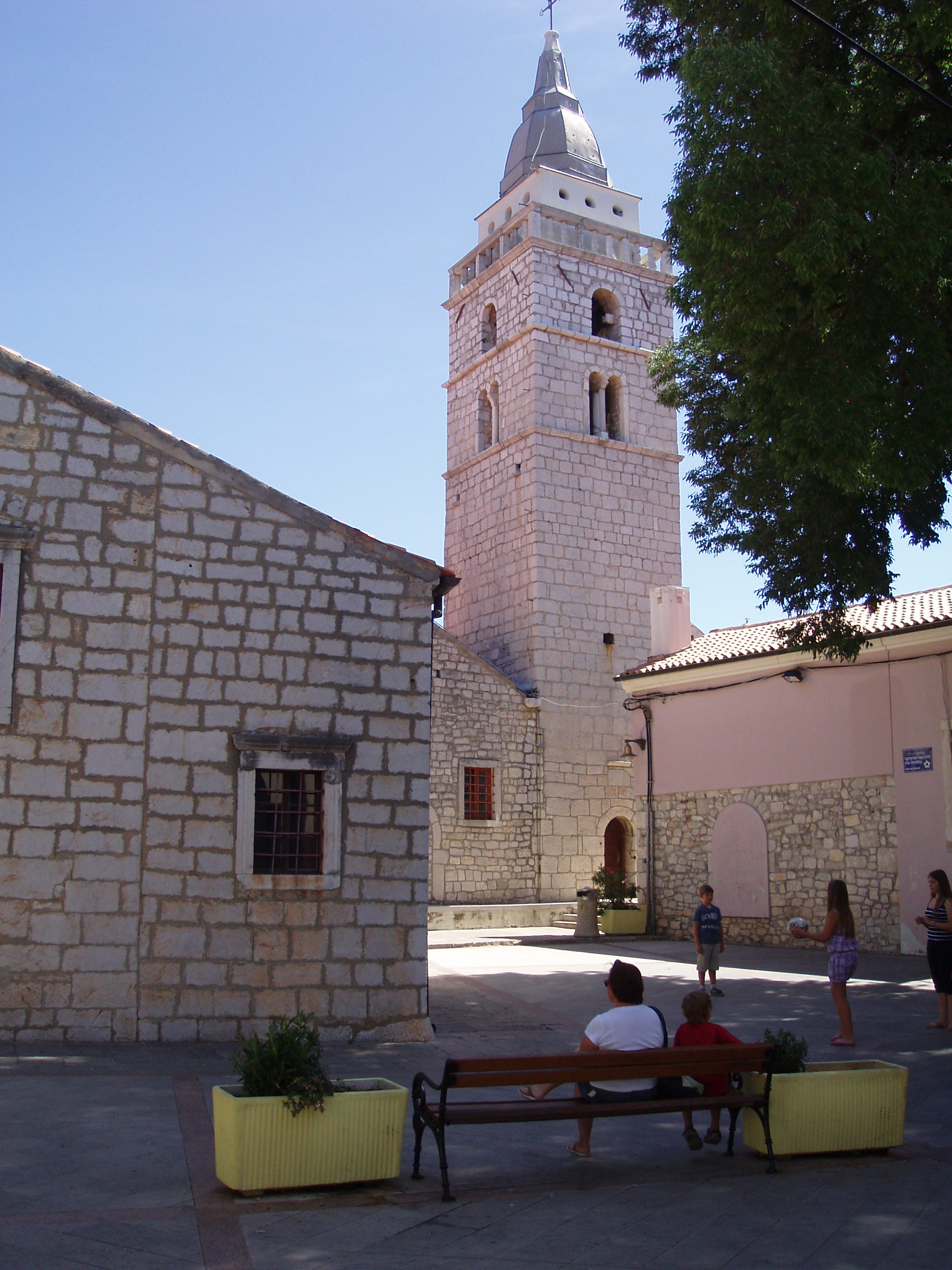
Church of the Assumption of the Blessed Virgin Mary in Omišalj

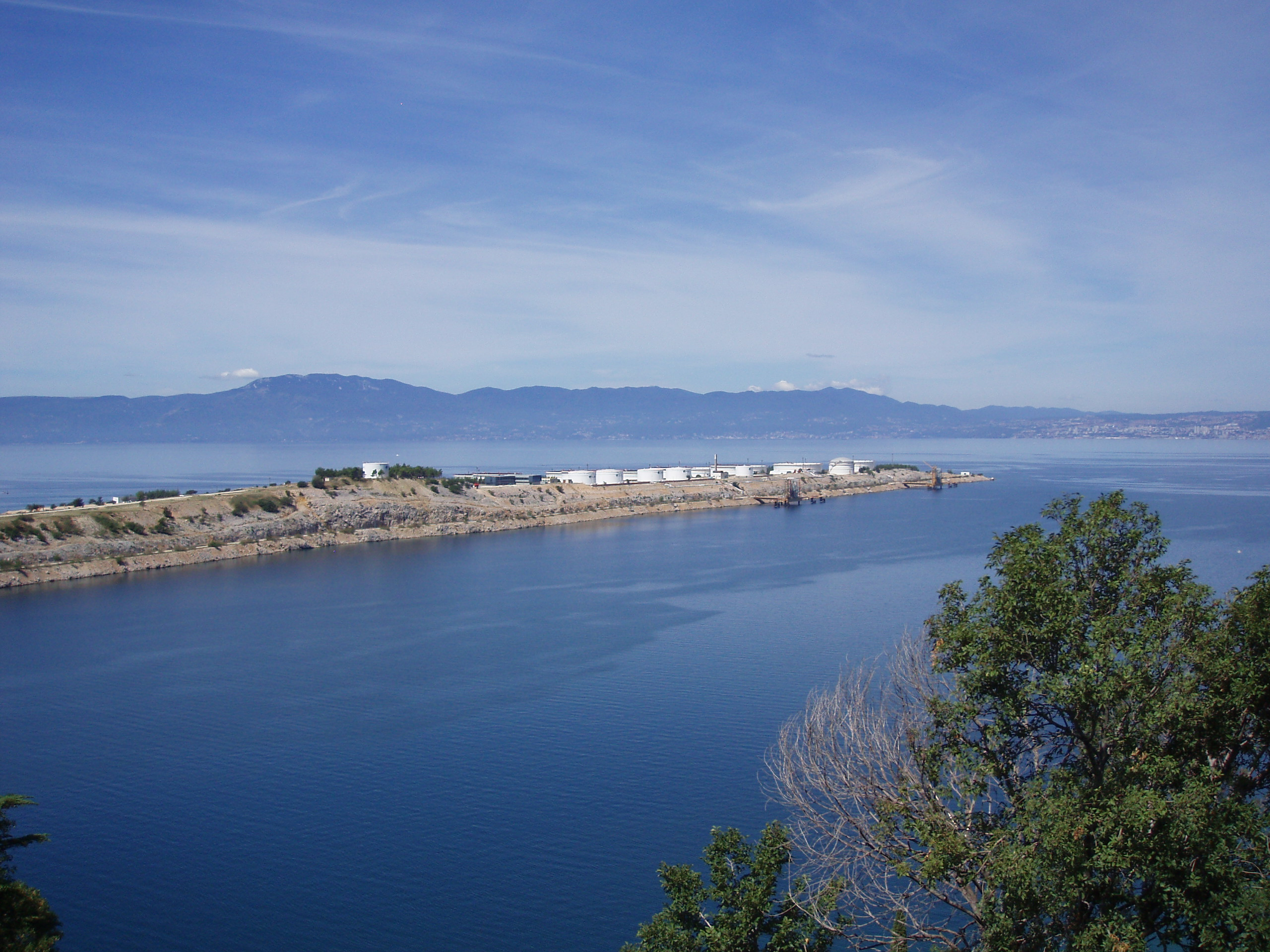
Mirim peninsula - petrol terminal

== Climate ==
Since records began in 1970, the highest temperature recorded at the local weather station was 40.0 °C (104.0 °F), on 19 July 2007. The coldest temperature was −10.7 °C (12.7 °F), on 10 January 1985.

== History ==
Omišalj is located close to one of the oldest settlements on Krk, dating from the 1st century when it was built by the Romans and named Fulfinum. The town was built on the cliff overlooking the bay of Kvarner, some 80 meters above sea level. It is the site of an early Christian basilica. Omišalj was first mentioned in 1153 and is one of the oldest places on the island of Krk, an important Glagolitic and cultural center. The town was referred to in the 12th century as "Castri musculi": this is from the Latin Ad musculi, meaning "the place of shells".

The land between the castles of Dobrinj and Omišalj, as well as the areas in and around Dubašnica and Poljica, were settled by Vlachs and Morlachs (originally Romanians who later diverged into Istro-Romanians) by Ivan VII Frankopan during the second half of the 15th century. They formed a community in the island of Krk that would last until 1875 when the last speaker of the Istro-Romanian dialect of the island died.

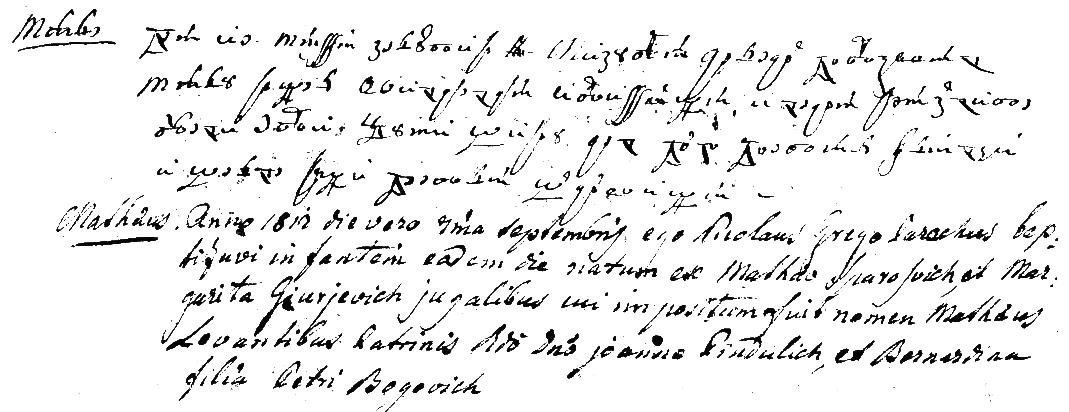
The final Glagolitic entry in Omišalj parish's baptismal register, by the cleric Nicholas in 1817

== Demographics ==
Villages and former villages under Omišalj include:

- Voz

== Religion ==
Its Catholic parish was first mentioned in 1213. In 1939, its parish had 1740 souls, plus 539 outside the country; it was the seat of a deaconate encompassing the parishes Omišalj, Dobrinj, Dubašnica, Kras, Polje (independent chaplaincy), Rosopasno (independent chaplaincy) and Sveti Vid.

List of parish priests of Omišalj:

- Grga Fugošić (b. Omišalj 1880-05-09, primiz Krk 1908-03-02)
  - Chaplain Ivan Vitezić (b. Vrbnik 1904-10-12, primiz Krk 1907-06-29)

== Governance ==
It is the seat of its own local committee.

== Folk Theater Festival ==
The Festival pučkog teatra ("Folk Theater Festival") takes place in Omišalj every year, which is "a kind of celebration of folk dramatic expression." The performances take place on Prikešte Square in Omišalj and in the old castle in the town of Grobnik, Primorje-Gorski Kotar County.

== Bibliography ==
- Draganović, Krunoslav (1939-04-20). Opći šematizam Katoličke crkve u Jugoslaviji. Sarajevo: Akademija "Regina Apostolorum".
