= Soline =

Soline may refer to:

== Croatia ==
- Soline, Bosiljevo, a village in Karlovac County
- Soline, Dobrinj, a village on the island of Krk
- Soline, Mljet, a hamlet in the Mljet municipality on the eponymous island
- Soline, Sali, a village on the island of Dugi Otok
- Soline, Župa dubrovačka, a village near Dubrovnik
- Soline Bay, a bay in the Adriatic near the island of Krk

== Slovenia ==
- Soline, Sečovlje, saltpans in village of Sečovlje, Slovenia

== See also ==
- Piranske Soline, a brand of gourmet cooking and table salt
