= Dobrinj =

- Municipality
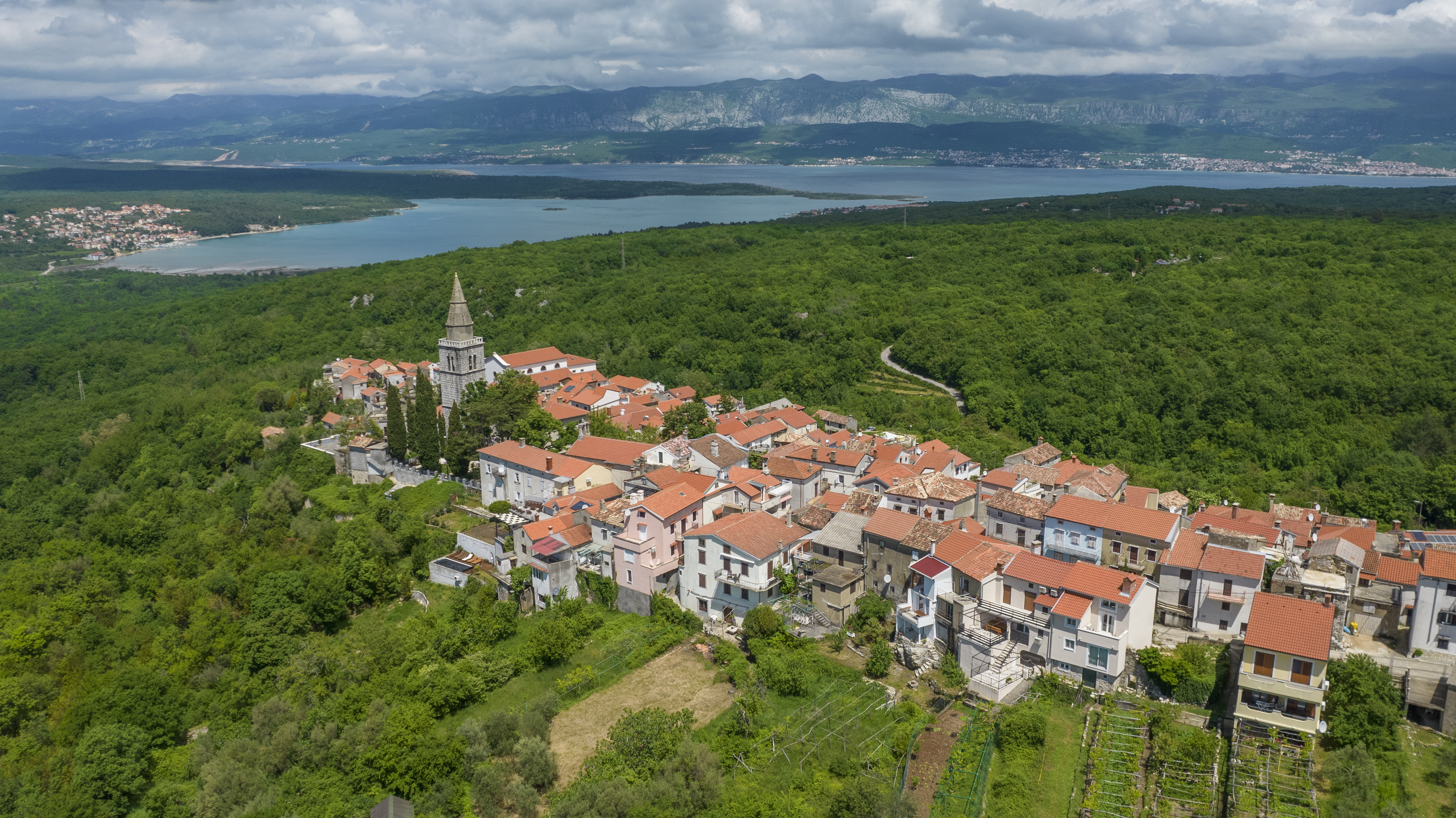
- View of Dobrinj

- Location of Dobrinj in Croatia
- Coordinates: 45.130°N 14.604°E
- Country: Croatia
- County: Primorje-Gorski Kotar County

Area
  - Municipality: 55.1 km^{2} (21.3 sq mi)
  - Urban: 2.2 km^{2} (0.85 sq mi)

Population (2021)
  - Municipality: 2,150
  - Density: 39.0/km^{2} (101/sq mi)
  - Urban: 89
  - Urban density: 40/km^{2} (100/sq mi)
- Postal codes: 51514
- Website: dobrinj.hr

Dobrinj is a village and municipality in the Primorje-Gorski Kotar County in northwestern Croatia, on the island of Krk. There are 2,150 inhabitants in the municipality, with 91% Croats. The village of Dobrinj itself has 89 inhabitants.

== Geography ==
Dobrinj and the municipality of the same name is located on the northeast side of the island of Krk. The place is located at an elevation of about 200 meters above Soline Bay.

The municipality of Dobrinj comprises three cadastral communities: Dobrinj, Soline and Sužan, with 20 settlements, covering an area of 55 km^{2}.

In relief, this area can be divided into a low zone (mainly around Soline Bay) and a high zone (Dobrinj, Kras, Gabonjin).

The Dobrinj municipality also covers much of the eastern coast of the island of Krk, facing Crikvenica and Vinodol on the mainland, with which it has always been closely connected. The coast is full of inlets, but apart from the reefs and cliffs, there is only one islet - Veli Skoljić. On the coast, the shallow bay of Soline, almost forming lakes, stands out, with low coastlines and three settlements: Klimno, Soline and Čižići. Other significantly smaller bays are Stipanja (which is the largest municipal settlement of Šilo), Petrina, Veterna, Murvenica, Jazbina, Lončarica, and Slivanjska.

Geologically, limestone and dolomite rocks dominate the area. Due to the faster erosion of dolomite, over millions of years, a layer of loose soil has been created that enabled the development of lush vegetation. Only in the principally limestone extreme northeastern part of the Košćera. In addition to limestones and dolomites, flysch zones occur, which, unlike porous limestone, are watertight. A river stream called Veli Potok has developed on one of these flysch zones.

=== Population ===
According to the 2021 census, Dobrinj municipality had 2,150 inhabitants, distributed in 20 settlements:

- Čižići - 133
- Dobrinj - 89
- Dolovo - 0
- Gabonjin - 191
- Gostinjac - 94
- Hlapa - 91
- Klanice - 47
- Klimno - 130
- Kras - 227
- Polje - 285
- Rasopasno - 125
- Rudine - 5
- Soline - 48
- Sužan - 70
- Sveti Ivan Dobrinjski - 41
- Sveti Vid Dobrinjski - 64
- Šilo - 418
- Tribulje - 55
- Žestilac - 11
- Županje - 26

Ethnic/national composition, 2001:

- Croats - 1,799 (91.32)
- Bosniaks - 20 (1.02)
- Serbs - 16 (0.81)
- Germans - 9 (0.46)
- Montenegrins - 4
- Hungarians - 3
- Italians - 3
- Albanians - 1
- Czechs - 1
- Poles - 1
- Slovaks - 1
- Slovenians - 1
- others - 62 (3.15)
- undefined - 39 (1.98)
- unknown - 10 (0.51)

== Religion ==
Its Catholic parish was first mentioned in the High Middle Ages, and its parish church was expanded in 1510, renovated in 1902. In 1939, its parish had 2243 souls, plus 460 outside the country.

List of parish priests of Dobrinj:

- Pavao Šabalja (b. Malinska 1879-11-29, primiz Krk 1902-08-03)
  - Chaplain Ivan Kirinić (b. Kras 1912-03-03, primiz Krk 1937-06-29)

== Governance ==
=== Local ===
It is the seat of its own local committee.

Chief: Neven Komadina (PGS)

Deputy Chief: Zoran Kirinčić (PGS)

Council President: Alen Šamanić (PGS)

Municipal Council:

- Marinko Galanto, Tomislav Saftić, Dubravko Fanuko, Darko Strčić, Ivancica Dunato (PGS)
- Zdenko Kirincic, Robert Justinic, Ratko Turcic (HSLS)
- Miljenko Variola, Nenad Brusic (HDZ)
- Marino Samanic (HNS)
- Emil Grskovic (Independent)

== History and population trends ==
There are many Roman sites in the municipality, mainly on the shores of Soline Bay and in the Gostinjac area, and it is assumed that saltworks existed in the Melina area at that time. In more recent explorations, carried out at St. Peter's Bay on the northwestern side of Soline Bay, remains of Roman pottery and ancient ports have been found. However, there are several sites indicating an Illyrian presence - the Zagrajini fort near Karst, Gradišće near Dobrinj, and Dobrinj, which itself was created at the site of the previous Illyrian settlement.

The history of Dobrinj is inextricably linked to the history of the entire island of Krk, of which it is an integral part. Dobrinj, along with Baška, Vrbnik and Omisalj, is one of the oldest kaštelas (early medieval city centers), which were founded sometime in the 7th century, i.e. at the time of the Croats' migration to the present homeland. These castles, along with the already existing town of Krk, were most probably erected at the place where the Illyrians lived until then, as evidenced by the numerous Illyrian sites, as well as the very position on the hill overlooking the surroundings. The antiquity of these castles is also indicated by the archaic forms of Old Croatian, ie Old Caucasian speech, in Dobrinj - Čokavica. However, unlike other castles, Dobrinj was not located directly by the sea and never had ramparts, which may be the reason that it was repeatedly killed throughout history (in the 16th and early 17th centuries) pillaged by pirates and Uskok.

The name Dobrinj was first mentioned in the Grant Certificate of the famous Dragoslav, written in Croatian and Glagolitic on January 1, 1100. In it, Dobrinj and neighboring Vrbnik are referred to as church (plavian) and municipal (komun) units with a judge, municipal clerk, and secretary. This grant is an important witness to the cultural, communal, and educational development of the contemporary population of Dobrinj and the island of Krk. Somewhere in the 11th century, Krk princes, later called the Frankopans, appeared. Their origins are still unclear but probably originated from a more powerful native (Croatian) nobility. There was a theory for a while that they were of Roman origin, but that was rejected. From then until 1480, the princes of Krk were the rulers of the whole island, including Dobrinj, which was directly governed by judges, but also by the so-called "princes on behalf of the prince". In the second half of the 15th century, Ivan VII Frankopan, Prince of Krk, settled to the western parts of the island Vlachs and Morlachs (originally Romanians who later split into Istro-Romanians) to have more manpower. These were settled in and around the areas of Dubašnica and Poljica and also in the lands between the castles of Dobrinj and Omišalj. They formed a community on the island until 1875 when the last speaker of the Istro-Romanian dialect of Krk passed away.

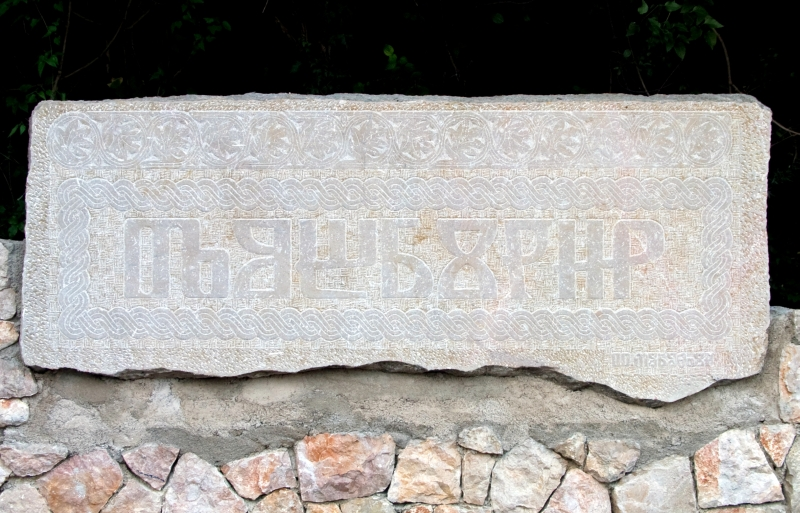
Glagolitic script at the entrance of Dobrinj on the island of Krk

During the Middle Ages, Dobrinj was one of the most important centers of verbiage. The HAZU archive preserves the Baptist Registers of Baptism that were written in 1559 and which are the oldest registry books in Croatia. These registers were written in Glagolitic script until 1850 when they were written in Latin.

The most important industry during the Middle Ages was certainly the saltworks in the Soline Bay below Dobrinj; salt was much sought after and appreciated at the time. After conquering the island, the Venetians close the salt pans, but their remains are clearly visible today.

In 1480, the Venetian Republic occupied the entire island of Krk and ruled it until the collapse of the Venetian Republic in 1797, after which the ownership of Krk changed hands several times between the Austrian and French, and eventually to the Austrian government. The Austrian government was in charge of Krk until the downfall of the Austro-Hungarian Empire, at the end of the First World War in 1918. The following few years were very uncertain for all the inhabitants of the island as the Kingdom of Italy laid claims on the entire eastern Adriatic coast.

The twilight of the Austro-Hungarian monarchy was the peak of both the village and municipality Dobrinj. The town of Dobrinj had 608 inhabitants in 1898, 390 in 1931, and only 216 in 1970. The area of the municipality reached the largest population in 1910 of 4,046, and a dozen years later of 4,033. Since then, the population has been steadily declining. After World War II the population was 3,319, and 2,273 in 1971. The reason for this decline is the two World Wars, but also the difficult economic situation on the island that drove its people into the new world, most notably America, but also in the fast-growing cities in a coastal area (such as Rijeka, Crikvenica) where many found jobs and livelihoods.

The time of the Kingdom of Serbia and Montenegro was a time of difficult life and large emigration. The whole island was a marginal and rather forgotten part of the monarchy. After World War II, the island became part of the Socialist Republic of Croatia within Yugoslavia. The difficult economic situation changed only around 1980 with the opening of the Rijeka Airport and the Krk bridge, thereby removing the island from isolation, which was a prerequisite for economic development, especially for tourism. Tourism is still underdeveloped in Dobrinj but has brought liveliness and interrupted almost the entire migration of the population from the island and from Dobrinj.

Although the town Dobrinj has never reached a population of 1,000 in its history, it has been called "the city" since ancient times. Residents of the surrounding villages would say they were going to Grad (meaning city in Croatian) when they went to Dobrinj. Its inhabitants were called gradars and the inhabitants of the surrounding villages vonskaras, ie "villagers". Dobrinj itself is divided into Dolinja, the older quarter, and Gorinja, a newer town.

Earlier Glagolitic manuscripts:

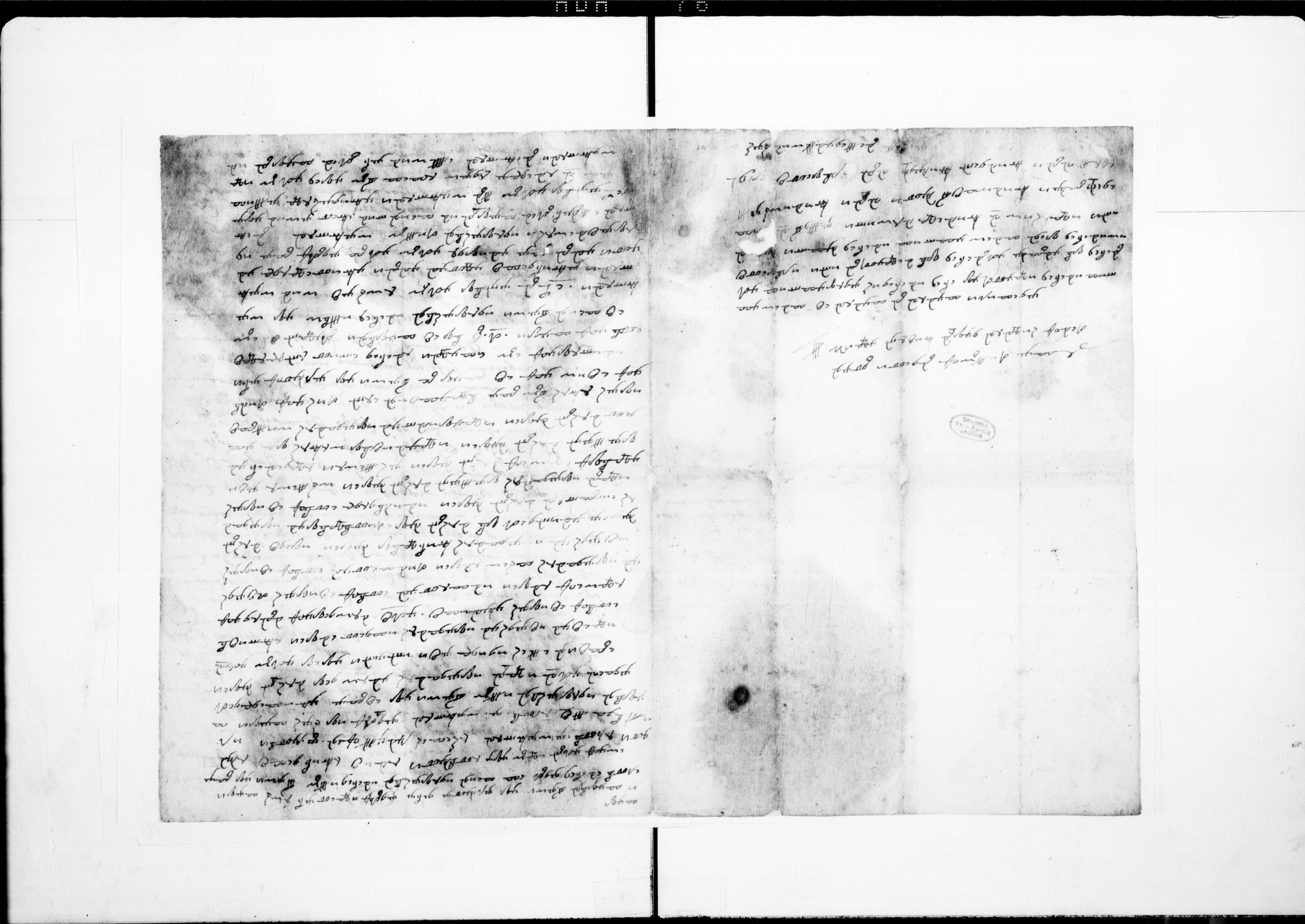
Will of Anton Patković written by Mikula Brusić on 1725-04-20

Power of attorney of Matij Fugošić dated 1729

Glagolitic manuscripts by notary Petar Petriš in Dobrinj:

Deed of purchase dated 1717-06-14

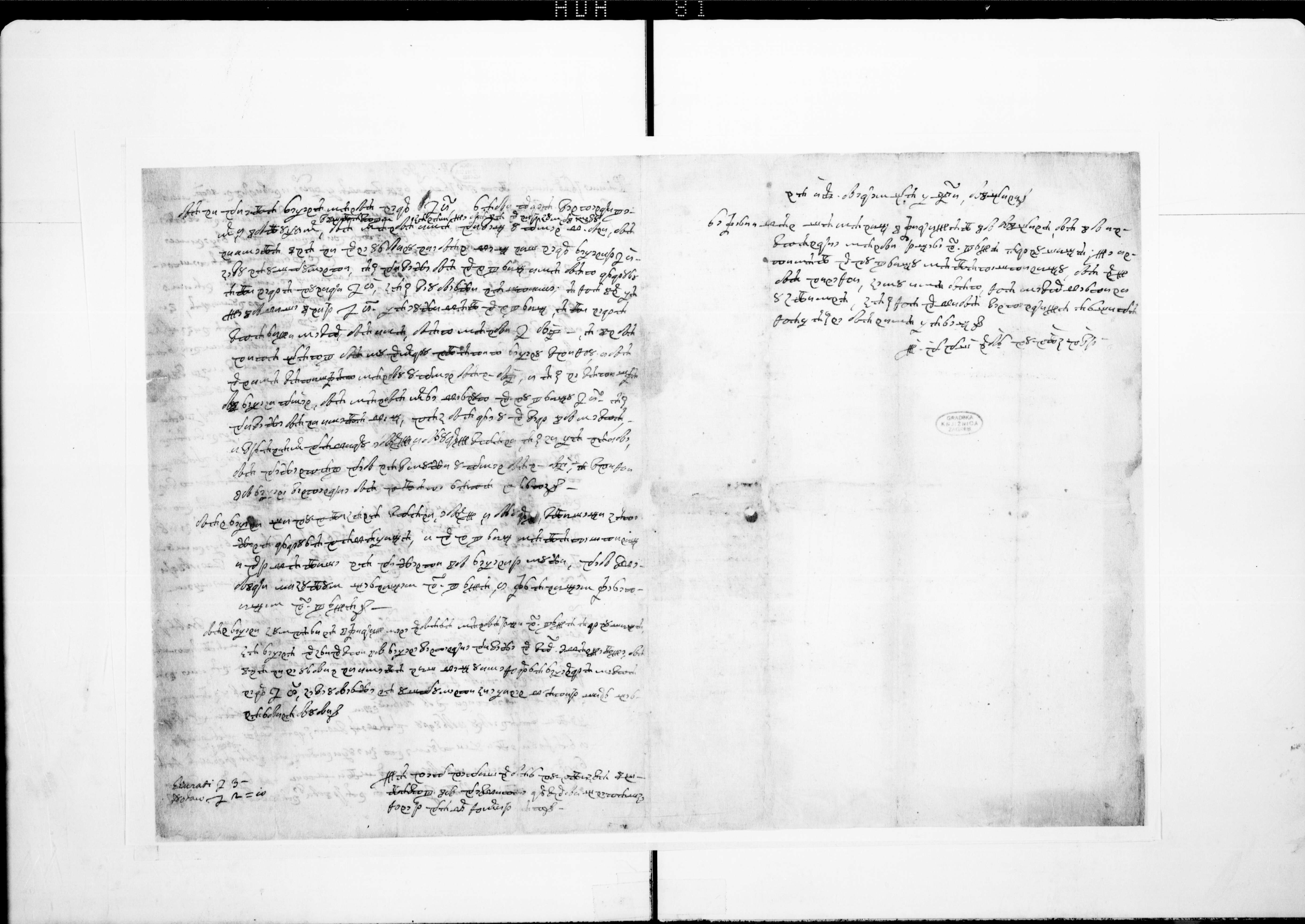
Deed of partition dated 1720-09-12

Glagolitic manuscripts by notary Anton Petriš of Vrbnik in Dobrinj:

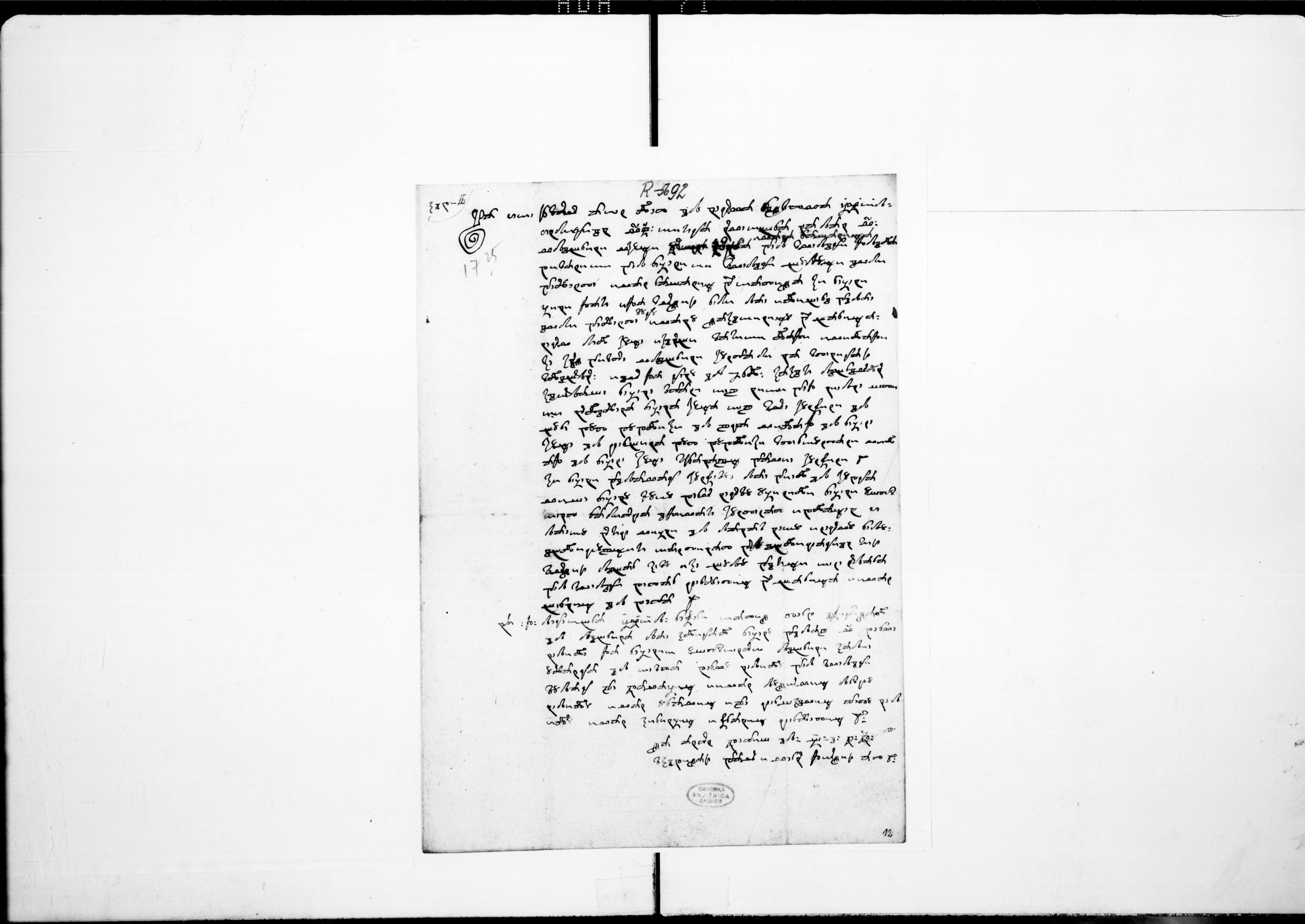
Deed of purchase dated 1725-11-03

Deed of purchase dated 1733-11-08

Deed of purchase dated 1750-01-11

Deed of purchase dated 1751-03-14

Deed of purchase dated 1755-12-28

Glagolitic manuscripts written by notary Ivan Prašnić of Dobrinj:

Deed of purchase dated 1758-04-25

Deed of purchase dated 1764-01-23

Deed of purchase dated 1773-05-24

Will of Kata Pavačić dated 1773-10-24

Deed of purchase dated 1779-01-07

Deed of exchange dated 1780-04-09

Glagolitic manuscripts written by notary Ivan Kirinčić of Dobrinj:

Deed of purchase dated 1776-12-21

Deed of exchange dated 1785-02-14

== Economy ==
Of the larger economic entities, only a construction company in Šilo operates in the municipality.

There are about 30 artisans in the Dobrinj municipality. Nevertheless, a large part of the locals work outside their municipality.

Although it has significant tourism resources, such as a preserved environment and rich cultural and historical heritage, the Dobrinj municipality does not have developed tourist offerings. The most important tourist destination is the town of Šilo, which is the seat of the local tourist board. The only accommodation capacities are in apartments and rooms for rent, except in Šilo mostly in Čižići, Soline, and Klimno. In recent years, there has been a growing demand for coastal-style inland remodeled homes.

Particularly great potential for tourism development exists in Soline Bay. One of the resources of this bay is the healing mud at the Meline site. The Sulinj peninsula, which closes Soline Bay, is mentioned as probably the first golf course on the island of Krk.

An important prerequisite for tourism, good transport links, is the existing one: the municipality is a 20-minute drive away from any tourist center on the island and from the Krk Bridge that connects the island to the mainland. In the neighboring municipality of Omisalj is the Rijeka Airport.

Formerly of great economic importance were shipbuilding, fishing, and agriculture.

Today, sheep and olive growing as sole agricultural industries of importance. The big problem for sheepdogs in the last ten years has been caused by bears and wild boars. Bears do not live permanently on the island of Krk, but come for the winter hibernation, flooding the Vinodol Channel. Sometimes they destroy whole flocks of sheep. In addition to causing considerable damage to agriculture, wild boar herds also pose a risk to people moving through the forest and even in the villages at night.

Olive growing in the municipality of Dobrinj has not been restored and developed as in some other municipalities on the island of Krk, for example Punat, Krk. Despite the municipality subsidizing the purchase of olive seedlings, the number of renewed or new olive trees has not yet reached its former numbers, for this region. The largest issue in the renovation of the olive groves is the great fragmentation of the estates and unresolved property and legal relations. However, there is an olive oil production plant in Polje for the production of olive oil.

The once intensively cultivated "Dobrinj field" stretching from Dobrinj, along Potok, all the way to the Soline Bay, is now almost completely neglected.

== Monuments and sights ==
=== Church of St. Vitus ===
The Church of St. Vitus in Sveti Vid Dobrinjski dates from 1100.

=== Church of St. Stephen ===
The Parish Church of St. Stephen in Dobrinj was first mentioned in 1100 AD, in the "Glorious Dragoslav" grant. According to the Glagolitic inscription, it was expanded in 1510. It is dominated by elements of the Baroque and late Gothic works. Initially a single nave, the parish church in the 18th century became a triple nave by merging a series of side chapels, which over the centuries were built into a one-nave church. Above its entrance, there is a canopy of the unique name cergan, and from there, it overlooks much of Kvarner. There was a bell tower next to the church, but in 1720 it was destroyed by lightning, and a new one was built. The new one was not built in the same place, but in a nearby old cemetery, from where it still dominates the whole area today. This bell tower suffered devastation, by the Germans during the occupation of 1944, but was rebuilt after the war.

=== Ethnographic Collection of the Island of Krk ===
The Ethnographic Collection of the Island of Krk is a diligently collected archive by the Barbalić family.

=== Infeld Gallery ===
One of the largest art collectors in the world, Peter Infeld of Vienna, bought and renovated an old, large house in the heart of Dobrinj, on the Placa, where more than 400 m^{2} of exhibitions of famous artists are held.

=== Sacred Collection Museum ===
A museum with a collection of sacred objects is located above the square near the church of St. Anthony.

=== Biserujka Cave ===
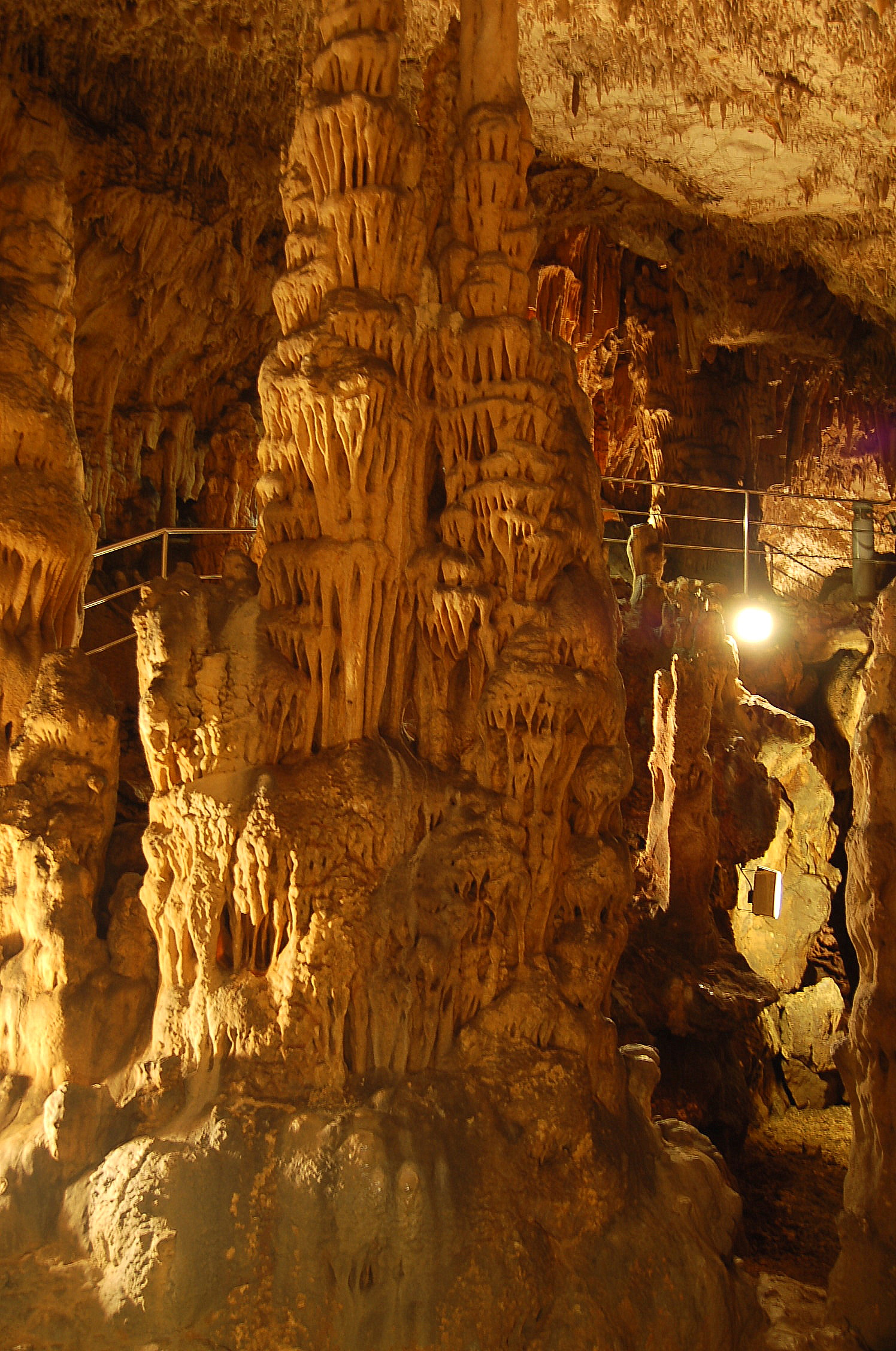
A view of the Biserjuka Cave in Dobrinj on the island of Krk

The Biserujka Cave is located a few kilometers north of Dobrinj, near the village of Rudine. Although it is just over 100 meters long, it is very interesting and rich in stalactites and stalagmites and, as part of the tourist offer of the island of Krk, is today one of the most visited caves in Croatia.

== Education ==
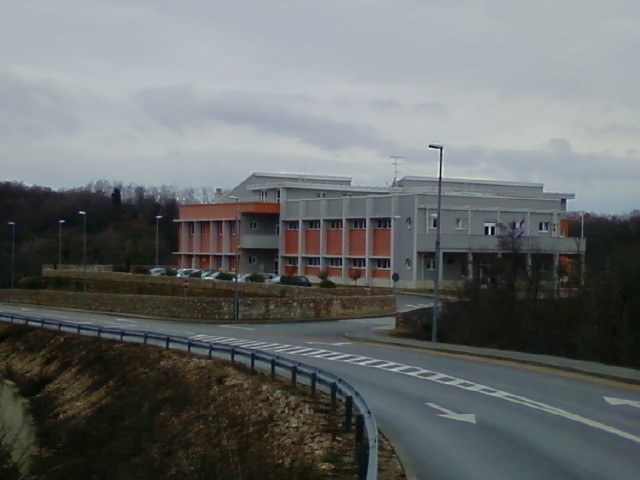
Elementary school in Dobrinj

The first school in Dobrinj was opened by Antun Kirinčić in 1841 in a private house. This was the beginning of education in Dobrinj. For many years there was only a four-year school in "Grad", so after the 4th grade of elementary school students were forced to continue their education in neighboring Vrbnik or Malinska. That was until the construction of a new, modern school in 2007, which gave the Dobrinj and the entire municipality education the best material conditions for further development.

== Dialect ==
In all the settlements in the Dobrinj municipality there is a special form of the Chakavian dialect, which is also called "chokavka". In some places where most of the Chakavian and Stokavian speeches have the sound a, a o sound appears. Thus, for example, Dobinj villages Gostinjac, Žestilac, Rasopasno are called Gostinjoc, Žestiloc, Rosopasno by the native population.

The reason is the replacement of the short Old Croatian half-voice by the voice of [23]:

- čo < čə
- zomi < vəzəmi "uzmi" (meaning to take)
- petok < petək

In words with a once long half-tone, a: stablo, dan (but: donos "danas") appears. There is a similar relation in Omisalj, but there is a short half voice that gives e. Similar differences appear in the Chakavian speeches in Prigorje and in the speeches of most of Slovenia.

== Culture ==
- Throughout its medieval history, Dobrinj was one of the most powerful centers of Glagoliticism in Croatia.
- The "Ive Jelenović" Cultural and Artistic Society within which the "Zvon" mixed choir of this folklore group operates
- Dobrinj Cultural Society
- Carnival associations "Optimists" and "Kataroška"

== Sports ==
- Sport fishing association "Čikavica" from Šilo
- Sport fishing association "Vela sten" from Čižić

== Notable people ==
- Ive Jelenović (from St. Vid) - ethnologist, philologist, toponomist, proofreader, screenwriter and co-author of the first documentary film on the island of Krk from 1938. Particularly important in the preserving and promoting of folk culture and tradition, especially folk songs and dance
- Ivan Črnčić (from Polje) priest, secretary of the Bishop of Krk, director of the renowned Croatian Institute of St. Jerome in Rome, the first member of JAZU, today HAZU, from the island of Krk. Writer, Slavist, philologist, historia. He was the first to prepare a reading and edition of the grant of the famous Dragoslav
- Petar Strčić (from Karst), member of the Croatian Academy of Sciences and Arts, director of its Archive, scientific and archival advisor, prominent Croatian historian, editor-in-chief of several collections, author of several mostly historical books
- Priest Bonaventura Duda, Baptized by Roko, (from Kras), Franciscan, Biblical, University Professor, Translator, Polyglot, Writer and Poet

== Bibliography ==
- Draganović, Krunoslav (1939-04-20). Opći šematizam Katoličke crkve u Jugoslaviji. Sarajevo: Akademija "Regina Apostolorum".
