= Hlapa =

- Village
- Location within Krk Location within Croatia
- Coordinates: 45.13584°N 14.62195°E
- Country: Croatia
- County: Primorje-Gorski Kotar
- Municipality: Dobrinj

Area
  - Total: 2.2 km^{2} (0.85 sq mi)

Population (2021)
  - Total: 91
  - Density: 41/km^{2} (110/sq mi)
- Time zone: UTC+1 (CET)
  - Summer (DST): UTC+2 (CEST)

Hlapa is a village located on the Croatian island of Krk. It is part of the municipality of Dobrinj. As of 2021, it had 91 inhabitants. The village is connected by road to the nearby villages of Soline, Sveti Vid Dobrinjski, and Županje.

== Governance ==
=== Local ===
It is the seat of its own local committee.
