= Dolova, Croatia =

Coordinates: 45.1152°N 14.6137°E

Dolova Dolovo
- ghost village
- Interactive map of Dolova

Area
  - Total: 2.0 km^{2} (0.77 sq mi)

Population (2021)
  - Total: 0
  - Density: 0.0/km^{2} (0.0/sq mi)

Dolova or Dolovo is a ghost village in Croatian municipality Dobrinj on the island of Krk.

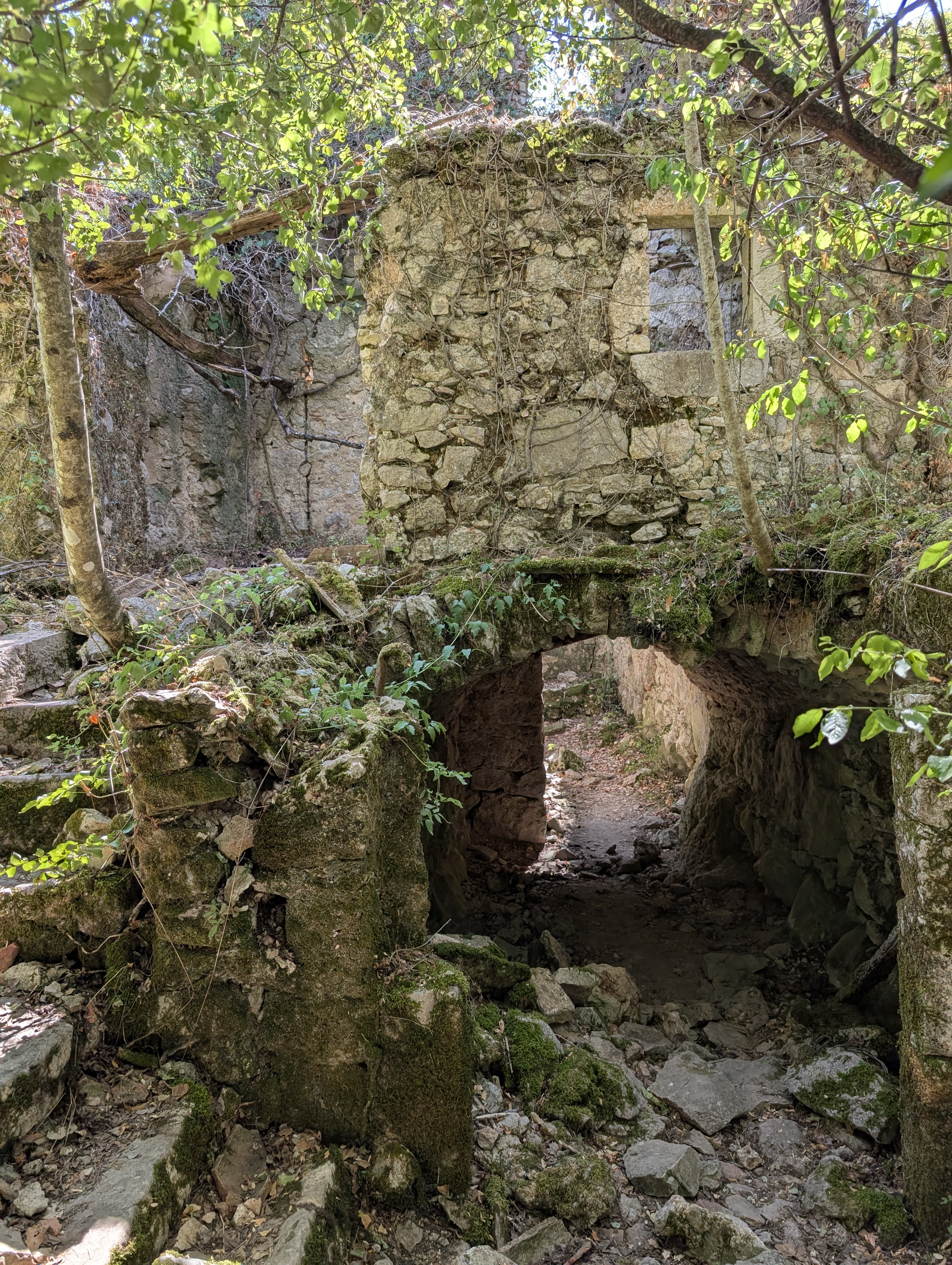
Dolovo

== Location ==
Dolovo is situated 2 km south of Dobrinj, and between the villages Kras and Gostinjac. Dolovo is the easiest way to reach the road from Dobrinj to Kras.

There are ruins of several old, stone houses and once-cultivated gardens, pastures and forests.

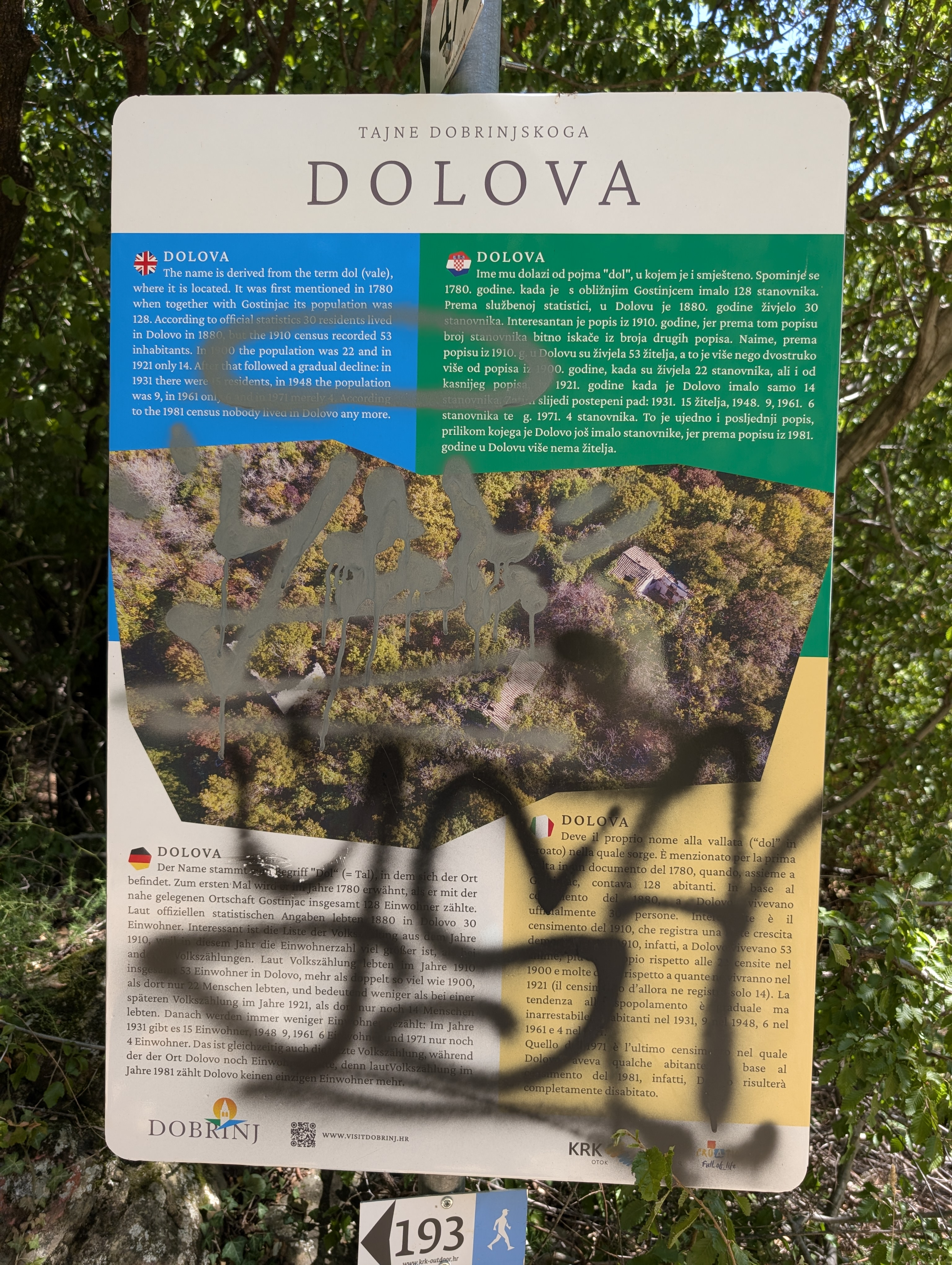
Dolova Info

== Population ==
The population according to the 2011 census amounted to 0 people.

== Governance ==
=== Local ===
It is the seat of its own local committee.
