= Žestilac =

Žestilac Žestiloc
- Village
- Location within Krk Location within Croatia
- Coordinates: 45.12896°N 14.63608°E
- Country: Croatia
- County: Primorje-Gorski Kotar
- Municipality: Dobrinj

Area
  - Total: 1.1 km^{2} (0.42 sq mi)

Population (2021)
  - Total: 11
  - Density: 10/km^{2} (26/sq mi)
- Time zone: UTC+1 (CET)
  - Summer (DST): UTC+2 (CEST)

Žestilac (Chakavian: Žestiloc) is a village located on the Croatian island of Krk. It is part of the municipality of Dobrinj. As of 2021, it had 11 inhabitants. It is connected by road to the nearby villages of Polje and Sveti Vid Dobrinjski.
