= Županje =

- Village
- Location within Krk Location within Croatia
- Coordinates: 45.14138°N 14.63049°E
- Country: Croatia
- County: Primorje-Gorski Kotar
- Municipality: Dobrinj

Area
  - Total: 3.3 km^{2} (1.3 sq mi)

Population (2021)
  - Total: 26
  - Density: 7.9/km^{2} (20/sq mi)
- Time zone: UTC+1 (CET)
  - Summer (DST): UTC+2 (CEST)

Županje is a village located on the Croatian island of Krk. It is part of the municipality of Dobrinj. As of 2021, it had 26 inhabitants. It is connected by road to the nearby villages of Hlapa and Polje. There is a church in the village devoted to Our Lady of Lourdes.

== Governance ==
=== Local ===
It is the seat of its own local committee.
