= Šilo =

- Village
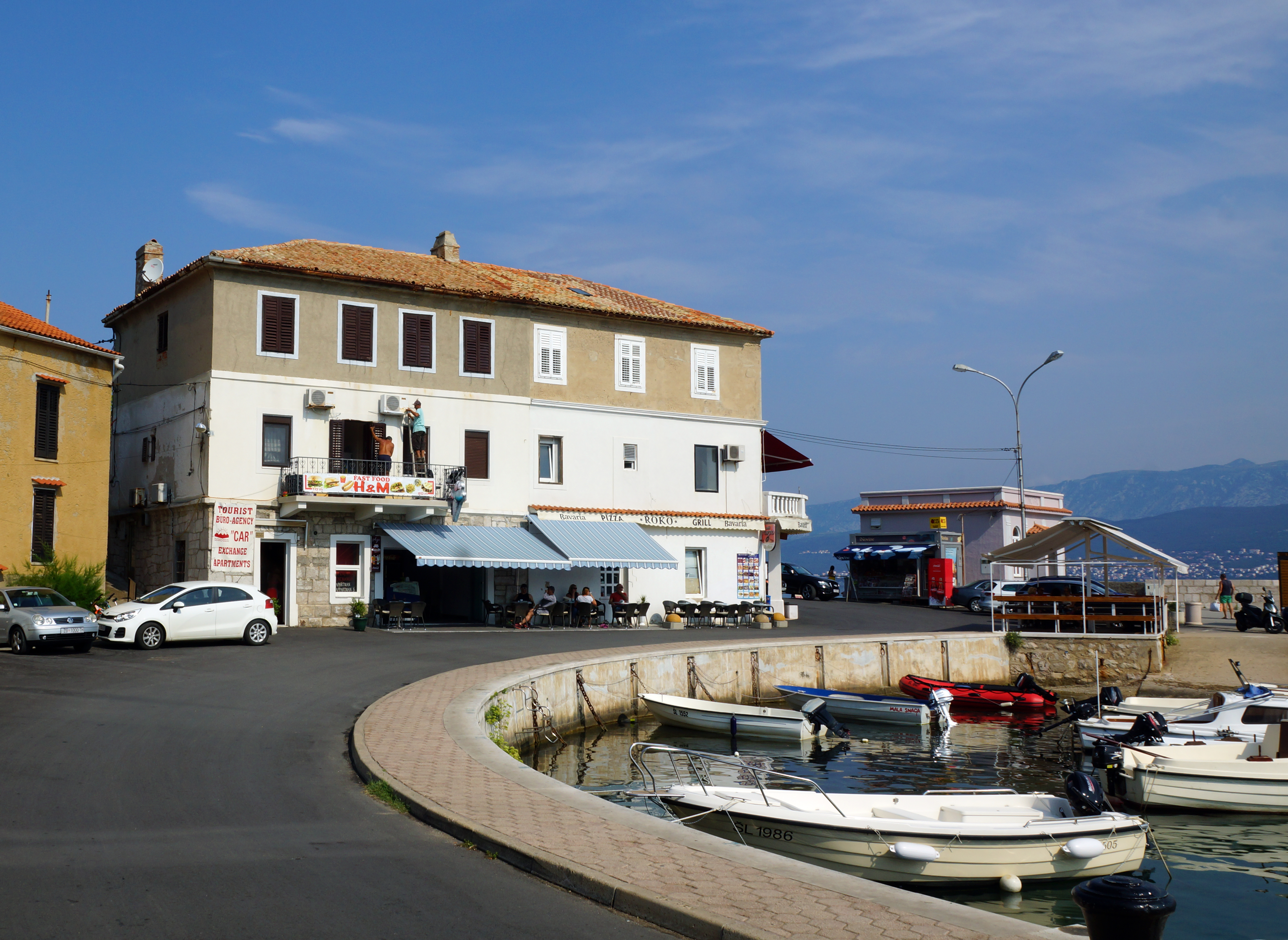
- Šilo port

- Location within Croatia
- Coordinates: 45.146831°N 14.663871°E
- Country: Croatia
- County: Primorje-Gorski Kotar County
- Municipality: Dobrinj

Area
  - Total: 1.7 km^{2} (0.66 sq mi)

Population (2021)
  - Total: 418
  - Density: 250/km^{2} (640/sq mi)
- Time zone: UTC+1 (CET)
  - Summer (DST): UTC+2 (CEST)
- Postal code: 51515

Šilo is a village in the north-east of the island of Krk, Croatia. As of 2021, it had a population of 418. It is one of the tourist centers of the Dobrinj municipality.

== Geography ==
It is located in a well-sheltered lagoon called Stipanja Bay, which is naturally enclosed by a cape called Punta Šilo. It is located across from Crikvenica, which is a tourist town on the Croatian coast. Šilo is separated from it by the Vinodol Channel, which is only 2.5 nmi (4.6 km) wide.

Šilo is connected to the rest of the island of Krk by a regional road. It is 5 kilometers away from the center of its municipality, Dobrinj. It is also 20 kilometers far from Krk Bridge; 19.1 km from the main city of the island, Krk; 13.6 km from Vrbnik, another settlement on Krk; and 47.7 km from Rijeka, which is the most important Croatian harbor and the third largest city in the country.

Stipanja Bay is well protected from eastern and southern winds by a narrow and low peninsula at the end of which Punta Šilo is located. At the end of this cape there is a lighthouse which emits a light beam: B BI 3s, whose maximum range is 7 nautical miles (13 km).

Šilo is the largest village in the municipality of Dobrinj, and it has the longest tourist tradition. It has numerous beautiful, sunny, and preserved pebble beaches and coves. Above Šilo there is an old settlement called Polje, which, alongside modern houses, has also preserved the traditional rural way of building as well as a traditional way of life.

== History ==
Šilo was established by people from Crikvenica and Selce. The town has gained importance by the development of tourism and the wish of people to travel to the islands. For a long time, it was a link between the island of Krk and the continent. For these reasons, the Krk Skydiving Society was established on 19 February 1905 in Šilo. After its foundation, it bought a steamboat called Dinko Vitezić, and on 1 June 1905, it opened the regular Šilo – Vrbnik – Crikvenica boat line.

Tourism began to grow after 1959 when the ferry between Crikvenica and Krk began regular service.

The basis of Šilo's economy is agriculture, fishing, tourism and shipbuilding. Šilo also has an auto camp, tennis courts, cafes, pizza places, a post office, a pastry shop, tourist agencies, a clinic, and the Municipality of Dobrinj Tourist Board, as well as the biggest economic entity of Dobrinj municipality – a construction company.

== Governance ==
=== Local ===
It is the seat of its own local committee.
