= Čižići =

- Village
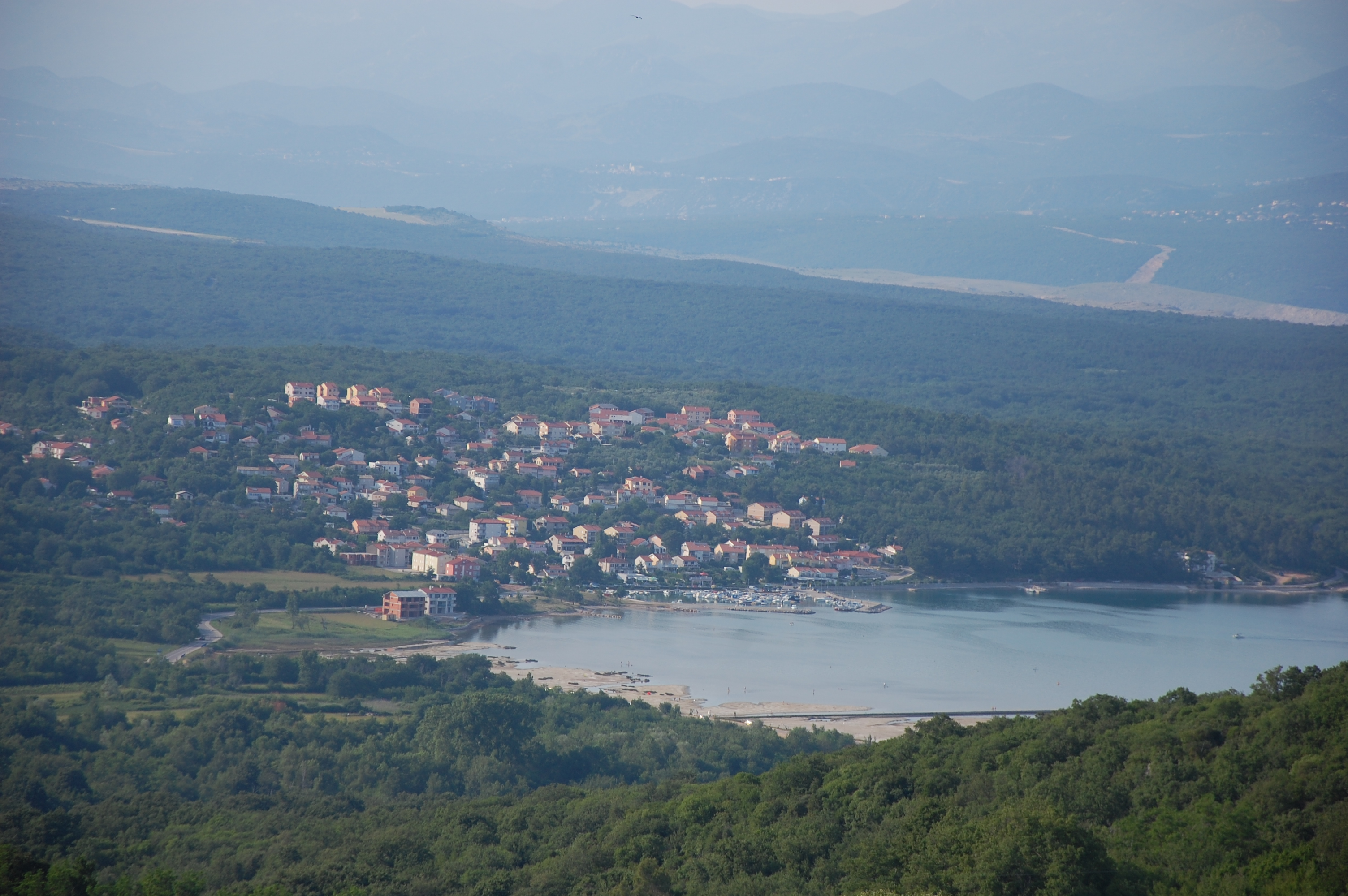
- View of Čižići

- Location within Krk Location within Croatia
- Coordinates: 45.15828°N 14.59646°E
- Country: Croatia
- County: Primorje-Gorski Kotar
- Municipality: Dobrinj

Area
  - Total: 4.5 km^{2} (1.7 sq mi)

Population (2021)
  - Total: 133
  - Density: 30/km^{2} (77/sq mi)
- Time zone: UTC+1 (CET)
  - Summer (DST): UTC+2 (CEST)

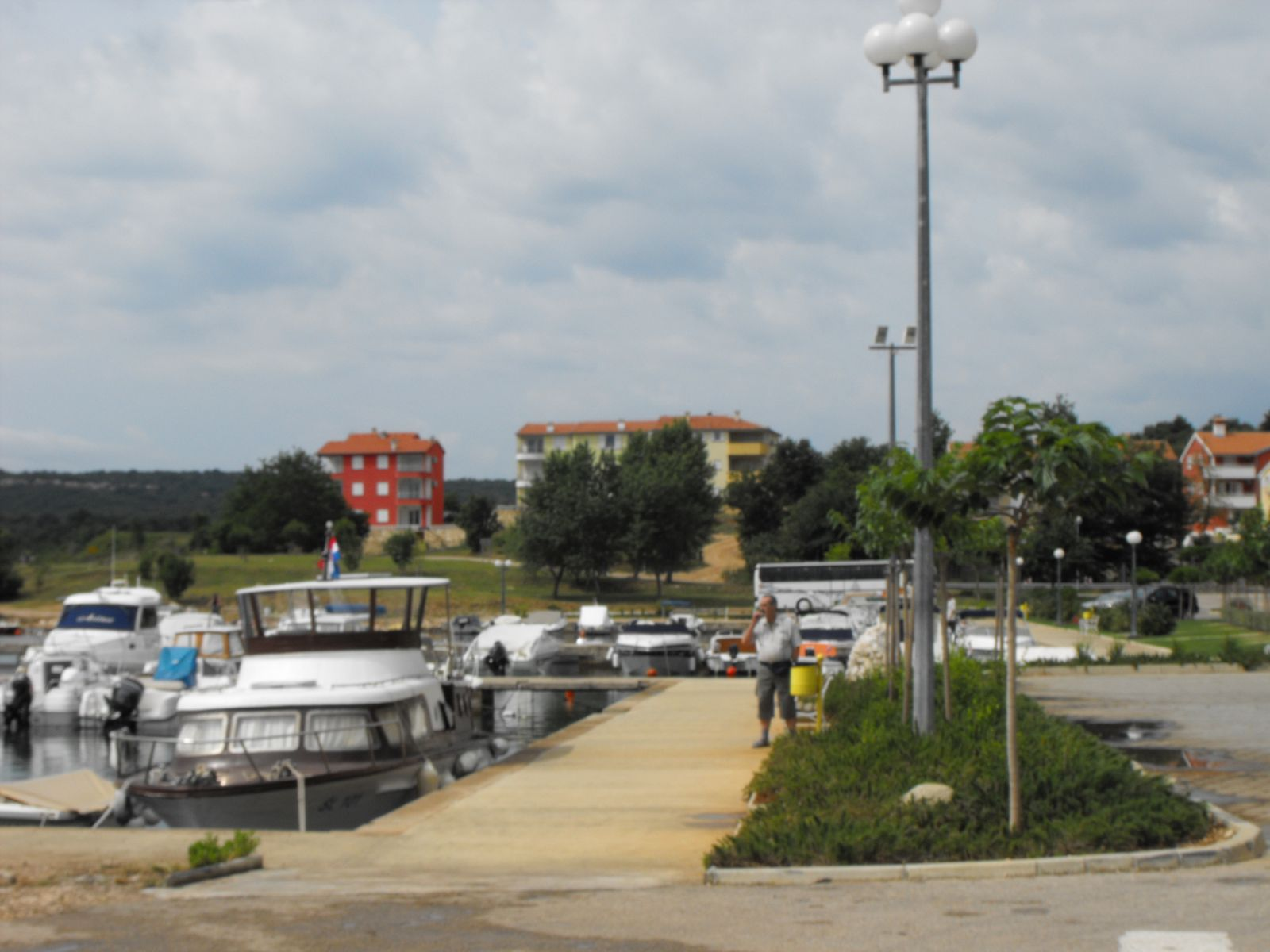
Čižići harbor

Čižići is a village located on the northeastern part of the Croatian island of Krk. It is part of the municipality of Dobrinj. As of 2021, it had 133 inhabitants. The village has a harbor providing access to the Soline Bay and the Vinodol Channel. The villages of Klimno and Soline are located on the opposite side of the bay.

== Governance ==
=== Local ===
It is the seat of the Local Committee of Čižići, encompassing itself and Rudine.
