= Rudine, Krk =

Rudine
- Hamlet
- Location within Krk Location within Croatia
- Coordinates: 45.18376°N 14.61228°E
- Country: Croatia
- County: Primorje-Gorski Kotar
- Municipality: Dobrinj

Area
  - Total: 4.2 km^{2} (1.6 sq mi)

Population (2021)
  - Total: 5
  - Density: 1.2/km^{2} (3.1/sq mi)
- Time zone: UTC+1 (CET)
  - Summer (DST): UTC+2 (CEST)

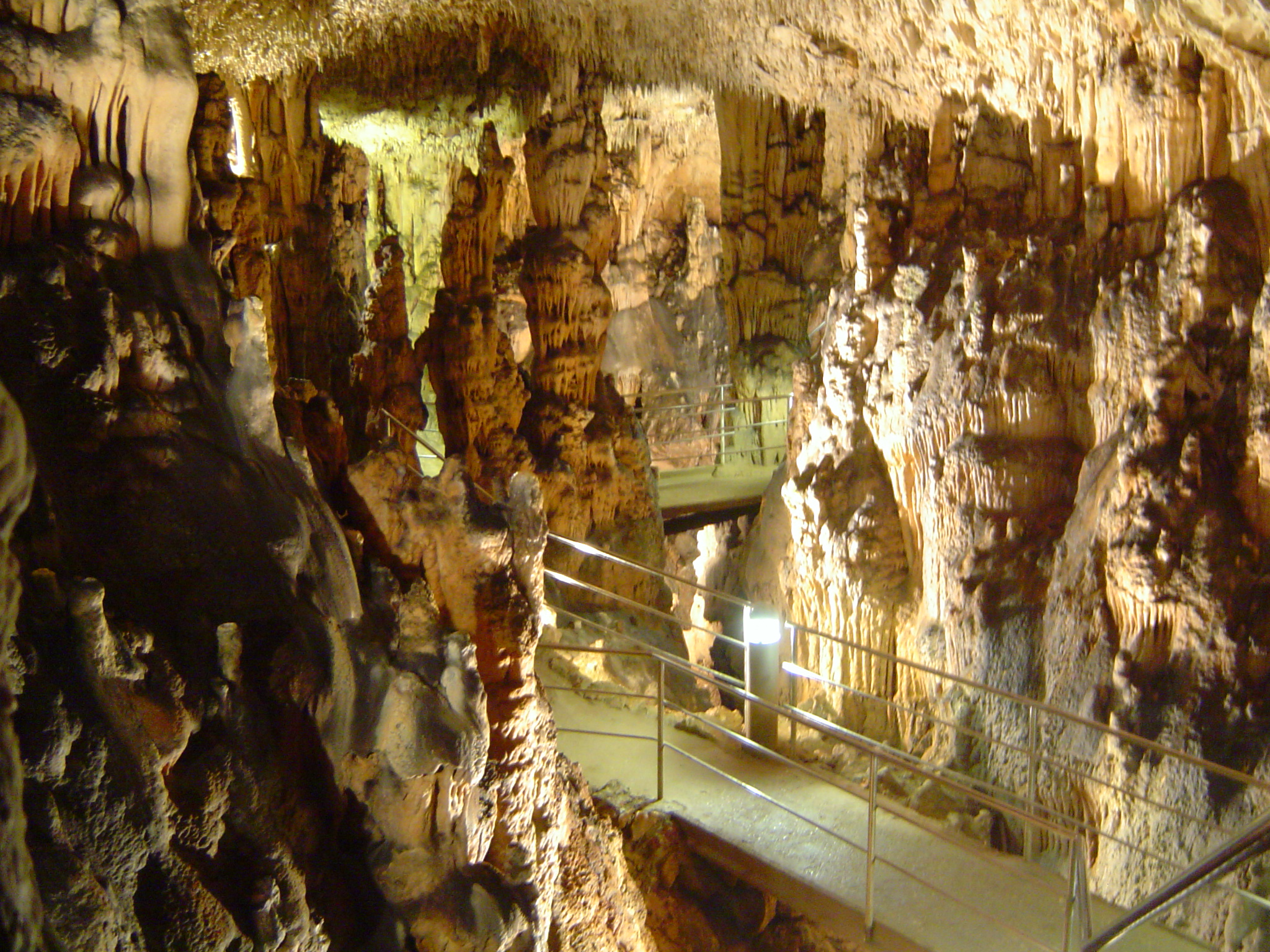
Inside of the Biserujka cave

Rudine is a hamlet on the northern end of the Croatian island of Krk, to the north of the Soline Bay. It is part of the municipality of Dobrinj. As of 2021, it had 5 inhabitants. Rudine is best known for the Biserujka cave.
