= Sužan =

- Village
- Location within Krk Location within Croatia
- Coordinates: 45.15090°N 14.58021°E
- Country: Croatia
- County: Primorje-Gorski Kotar
- Municipality: Dobrinj

Area
  - Total: 3.2 km^{2} (1.2 sq mi)

Population (2021)
  - Total: 70
  - Density: 22/km^{2} (57/sq mi)
- Time zone: UTC+1 (CET)
  - Summer (DST): UTC+2 (CEST)

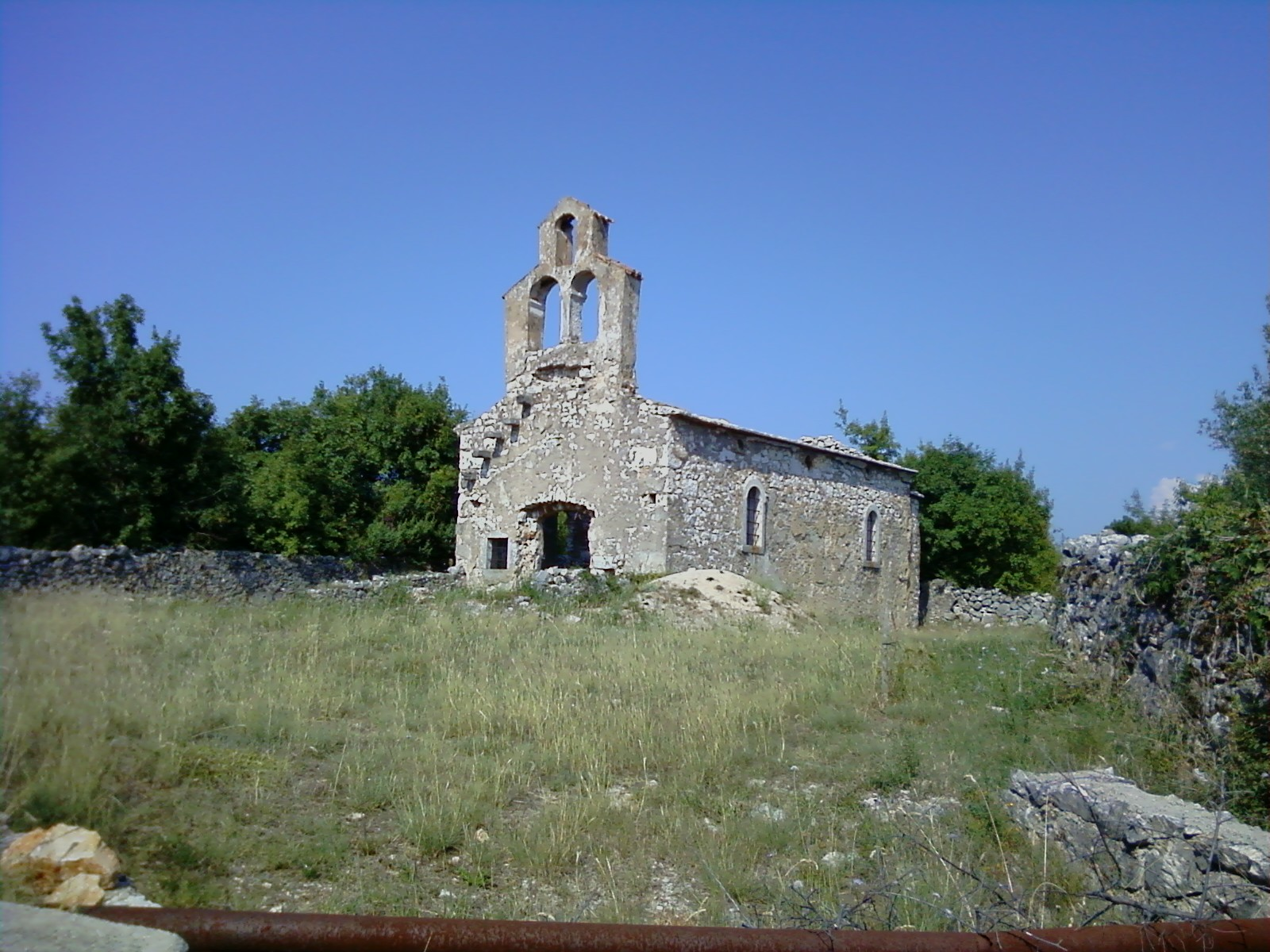
Church of All Saints

Sužan is a village on the Croatian island of Krk, 1 km to the southwest of Čižići. It is part of the municipality of Dobrinj. As of 2021, it had 70 inhabitants.

The ruins of a church, the Church of All Saints (Croatian: Crkve Svih Svetih) can be found in the village. This church dates from 1514 and was eventually left abandoned in 1927.

== Governance ==
=== Local ===
It is the seat of its own local committee.
