= Bonaventura Duda =

Croatian Franciscan theologian and biblical scholar

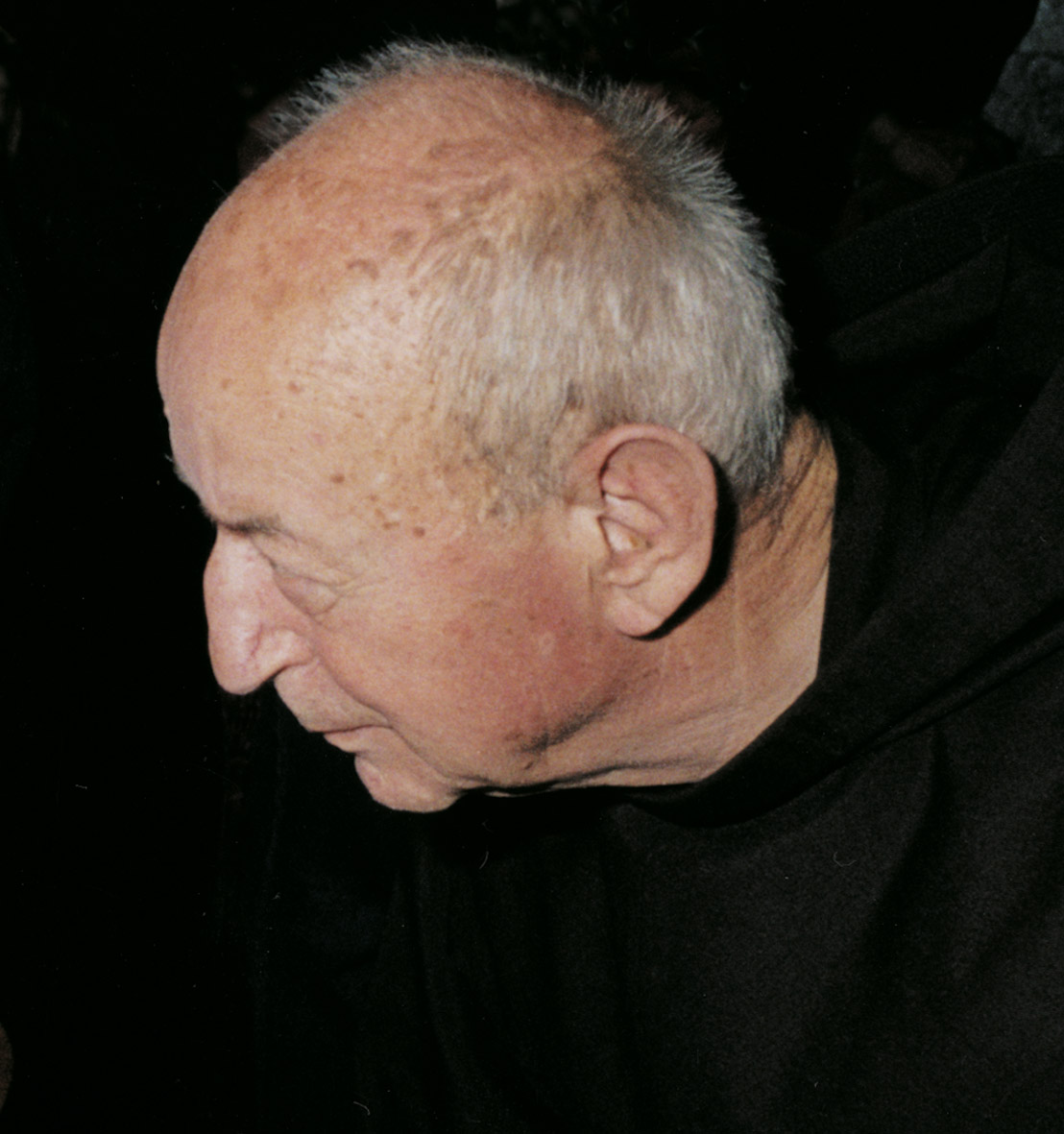
- Born: Roko Duda; 14 January 1924; Fiume, Free State of Fiume
- Died: 3 August 2017 (aged 93); Varaždin, Croatia
- Education: University of Zagreb; Pontifical University Antonianum; Pontifical Biblical Institute
- Occupation: Franciscan friar
- Writing career
- Notable awards: Pro Ecclesia et Pontifice; Order of Danica Hrvatska

Bonaventura Duda (14 January 1924 – 3 August 2017) was a Croatian Franciscan, theologian, biblical scholar, and a corresponding member of the Croatian Academy of Sciences and Arts.

== Early life and education ==
Roko Duda was born in the Free State of Fiume (now Rijeka, Croatia) and spent his childhood in the village of Kras on the island of Krk where he attended elementary school from 1929 to 1933. After finishing additional two years of civic school in Sušak in 1935, Duda attended Franciscan high school in Varaždin from which he graduated in 1944. He joined the Franciscan Order on 14 August 1941. He studied theology at the Catholic Theological Faculty of the University in Zagreb from 1944 to 1950.

During this period, Duda became a musician, playing together with the former organist of the Franciscan church in Zagreb, Fra Kamila Kolba. Duda was ordained to the priesthood on 15 January 1950. In December 1952, he achieved degree of licentiate in theology. From fall 1954 to June 1957 he studied in Rome, first at the Pontifical University Antonianum (1954–1955), where he received his doctorate in theology, and then at the Pontifical Biblical Institute (1955–57), where he received biblical licentiate.

== Professional work ==
Duda was known as one of the greatest biblical translators and promoters of the spirit of the Second Vatican Council. He, together with franciscan Zorislav Lajos, started publication of religious newspapers Glas s Koncila that in 1963 become Glas Koncila. Duda and Jure Kaštelan were founders and chief editors of the translation of the Bible into Croatian that was published by Stvarnost in 1968. He and Jerko Fućak translated the New Testament into Croatian and prepared new Lectionary in 1969. Duda participated in the founding of the publishing house Kršćanska sadašnjost and Teološko društvo Kršćanska sadašnjost in 1968.

From 1964 to 1969 he was professor and head of the Department of the Scriptures of the New Testament at the Catholic Theological Faculty of the University of Zagreb. He was elected several times a vice dean and from 1982 to 1986, dean of Faculty. He retired on 1 October 1993, and was elected Professor Emeritus on 9 November 2001.

== Death ==
Bonaventura Duda died on 3 August 2017, aged 93, in Varaždin.

== Awards ==
Duda received science research award Annales Pilar from the Institute of Social Sciences Ivo Pilar for year 2004. He won many other national and international awards, including Pro Ecclesia et Pontifice, Order of Danica Hrvatska, and the Charter of the City of Zagreb.

From 2010 until his death, Duda was a corresponding member of the Croatian Academy of Sciences and Arts in the Department of Social Sciences.

== Main works ==
- The Seed is the Word of God (Sjeme je Riječ Božja) (1987)
- The Sower is the Son of Man (Sijač je Sin Čovječji) (1989)
- In the Noble Heart (U plemenitu srcu) (1990)
- Church Council's Themes (Koncilske teme) (1995)
- In the Light of the Word of God (U svjetlu Božje riječi) (2000)
