= Fulfinum =

Roman settlement in Krk, Croatia

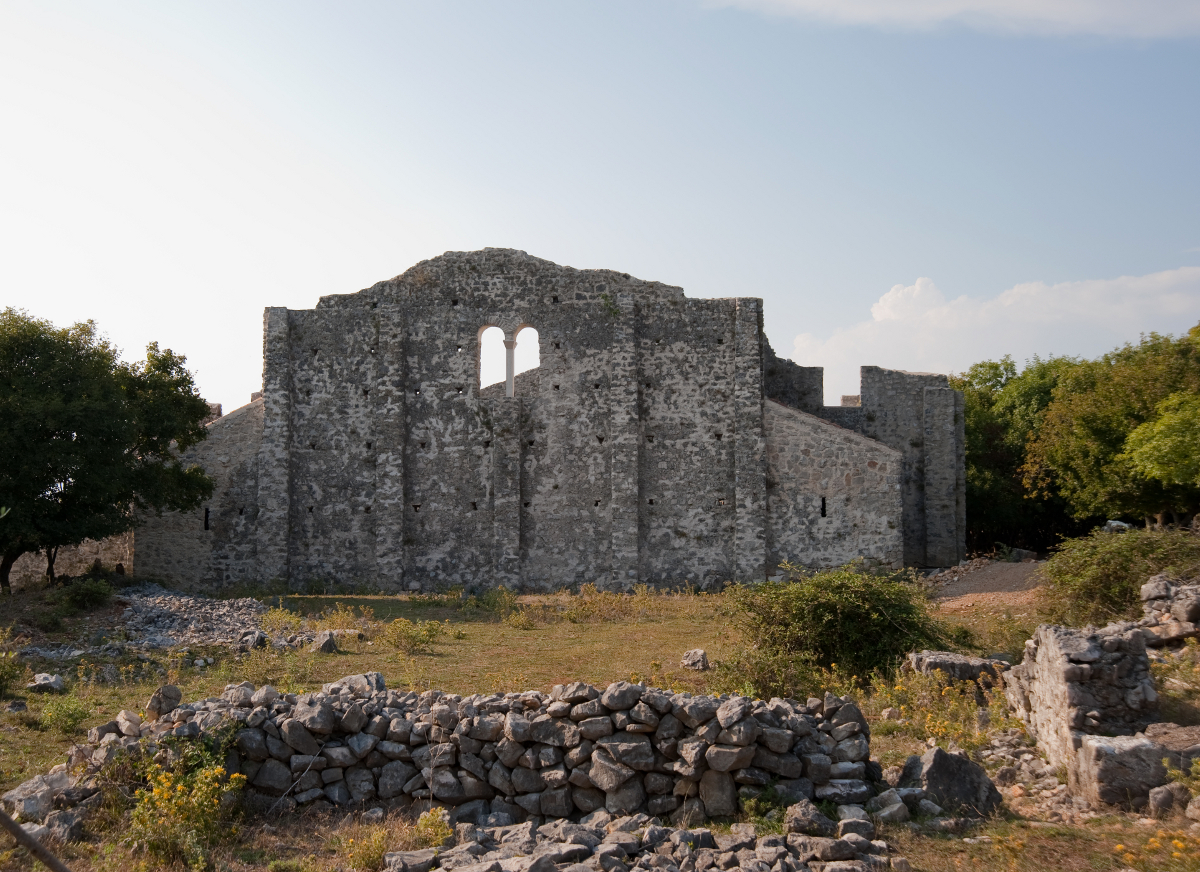
Mirine basilica

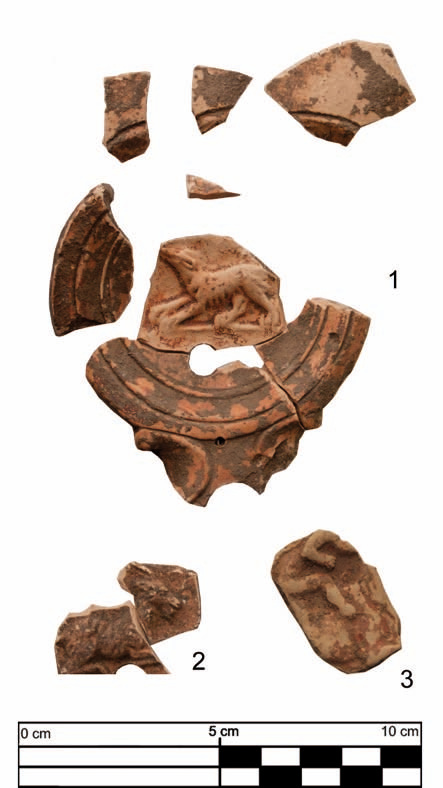
Pottery from Fulfinum. 1st century.

Municipium Flavium Fulfinum was an old Roman settlement on the island of Krk, Croatia, just a few kilometres from the town of Omišalj.

Archaeological findings show the first traces of settlement in the area dating back to the 1st century when the Romans settled the area following the Illyrian Wars as a retirement community for soldiers. The Romans constructed the city for the retired Roman soldiers during the Flavian dynasty. The settlement was abandoned in the Late antiquity.
