= Klimno =

- Village
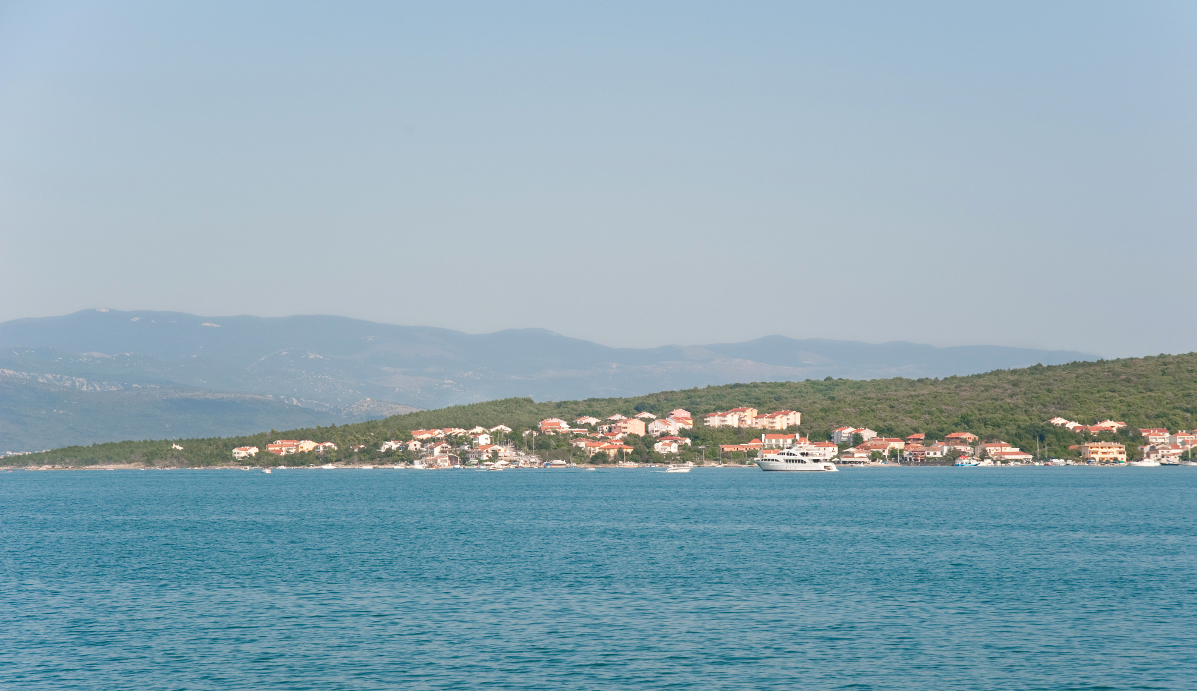
- View of Klimno

- Location within Krk Location within Croatia
- Coordinates: 45.15530°N 14.62089°E
- Country: Croatia
- County: Primorje-Gorski Kotar
- Municipality: Dobrinj

Area
  - Total: 2.2 km^{2} (0.85 sq mi)

Population (2021)
  - Total: 130
  - Density: 59/km^{2} (150/sq mi)
- Time zone: UTC+1 (CET)
  - Summer (DST): UTC+2 (CEST)

Klimno is a village on the northeastern part of the Croatian island of Krk. It is part of the municipality of Dobrinj. As of 2021, it had 130 inhabitants. A popular tourist attraction, the village has various beaches and a marina providing access to the Soline Bay and the Vinodol Channel. The village of Čižići is located on the opposite side of the bay, and the village of Soline is to the southwest of Klimno.

== Governance ==
=== Local ===
It is the seat of its own local committee.
