= Rasopasno =

Rasopasno Rosopasno
- Village
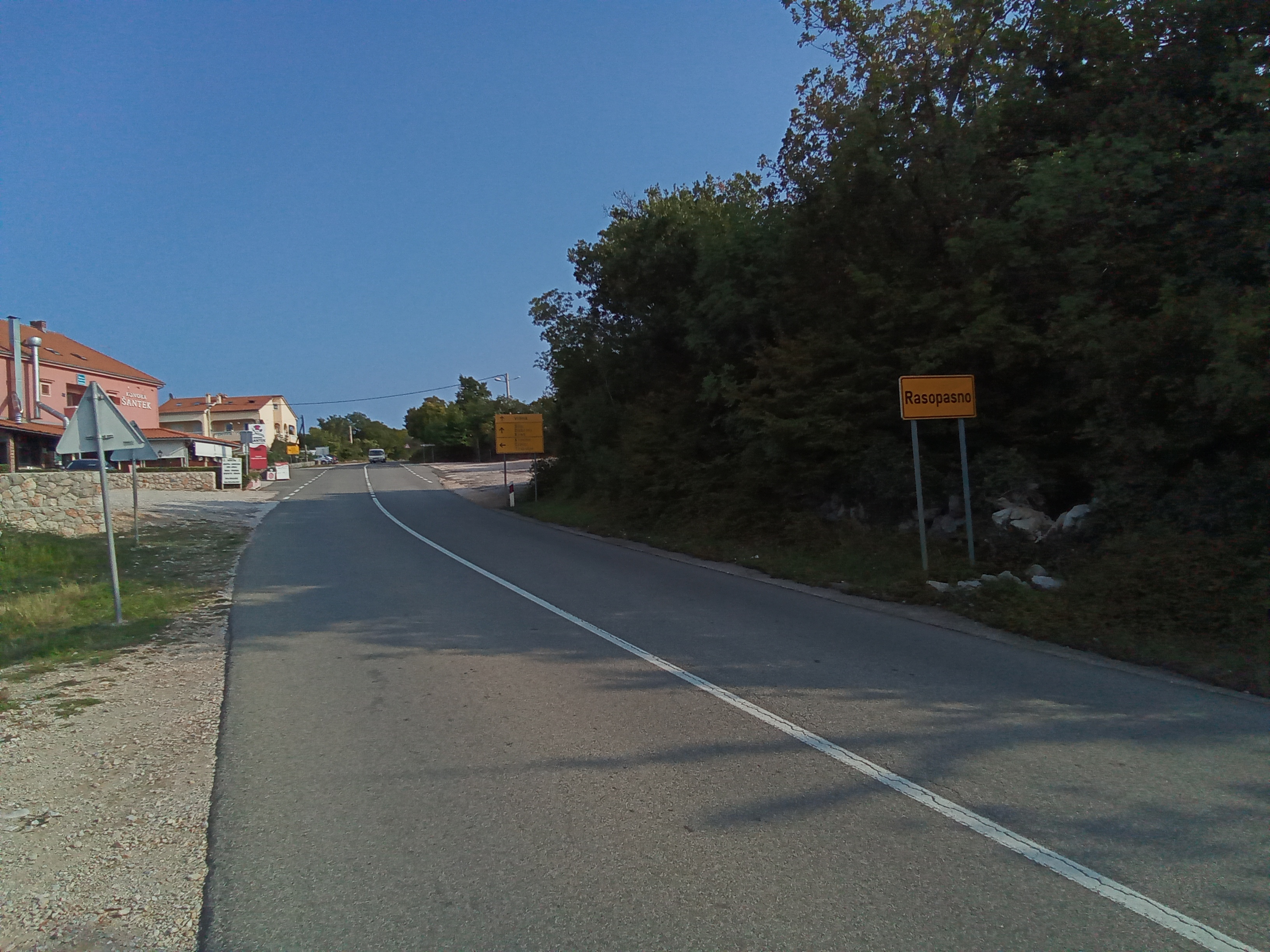
- Entrance to Rasopasno

- Location within Krk Location within Croatia
- Coordinates: 45.12287°N 14.56572°E
- Country: Croatia
- County: Primorje-Gorski Kotar
- Municipality: Dobrinj

Area
  - Total: 2.9 km^{2} (1.1 sq mi)

Population (2021)
  - Total: 125
  - Density: 43/km^{2} (110/sq mi)
- Time zone: UTC+1 (CET)
  - Summer (DST): UTC+2 (CEST)

Rasopasno is a village on the Croatian island of Krk. It is part of the municipality of Dobrinj. As of 2021, it had 125 inhabitants. It is located to the east of Malinska and to the north of Gabonjin.

== Religion ==
Its Catholic parish was made independent in 1904, and its chapel was built 1886. In 1939, its parish had 776 souls, plus 225 outside the country.

List of parish priests of Rasopasno:

- Josip Ivošić (b. Vrbnik 1909-09-08, primiz Krk 1933-04-01)

== Governance ==
=== Local ===
It is the seat of its own local committee.

== Bibliography ==
- Draganović, Krunoslav (1939-04-20). Opći šematizam Katoličke crkve u Jugoslaviji. Sarajevo: Akademija "Regina Apostolorum".
