= Sveti Ivan Dobrinjski =

- Village
- Location within Krk Location within Croatia
- Coordinates: 45.12566°N 14.58484°E
- Country: Croatia
- County: Primorje-Gorski Kotar
- Municipality: Dobrinj

Area
  - Total: 2.3 km^{2} (0.89 sq mi)

Population (2021)
  - Total: 41
  - Density: 18/km^{2} (46/sq mi)
- Time zone: UTC+1 (CET)
  - Summer (DST): UTC+2 (CEST)

Sveti Ivan Dobrinjski is a village located on the Croatian island of Krk. It is part of the municipality of Dobrinj. As of 2021, it had 41 inhabitants. The village is named after John the Baptist, and as such, a church devoted to him is located in the village.

== Governance ==
=== Local ===
It is the seat of its own local committee.
