= Gabonjin =

- Village
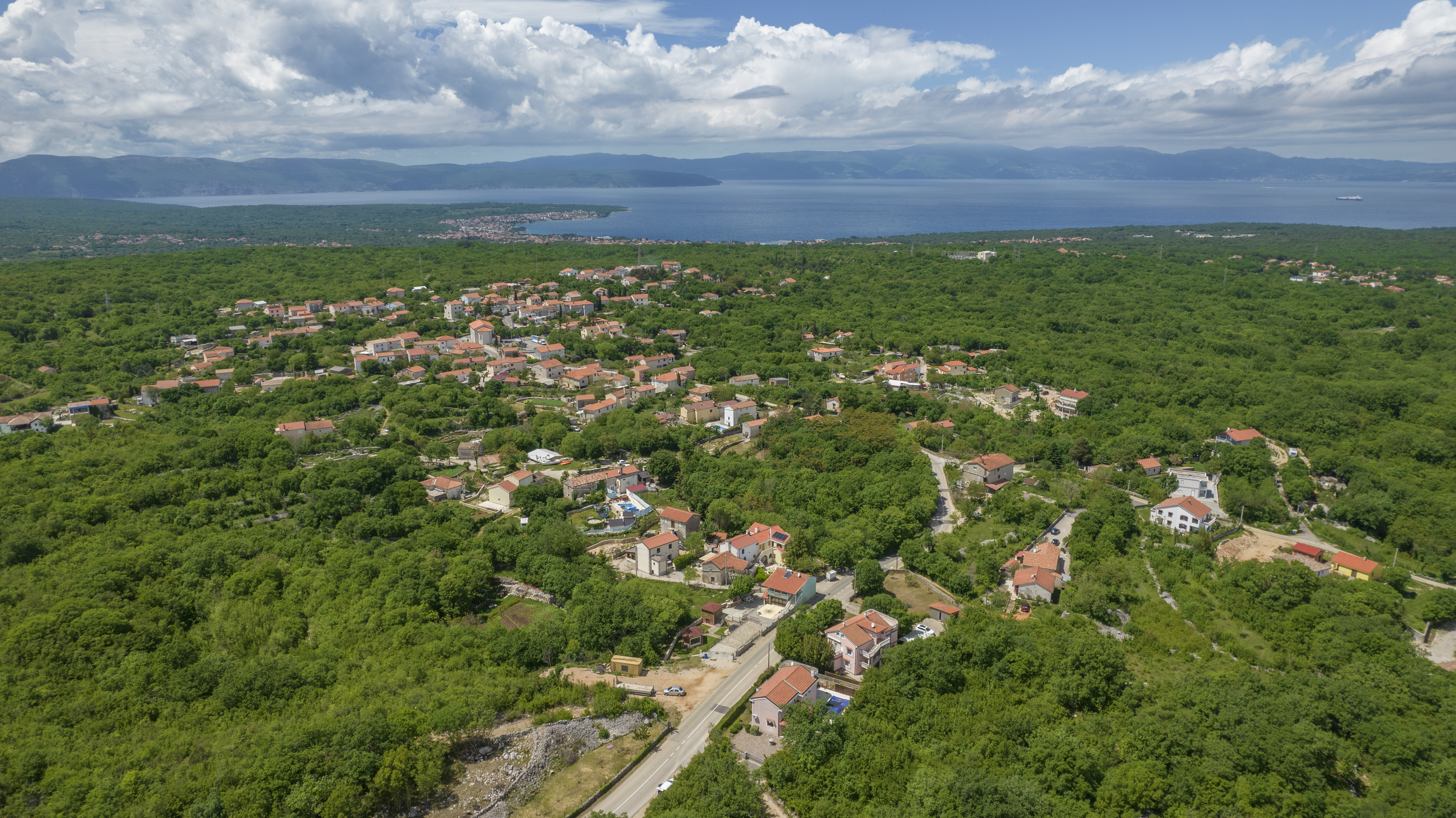
- View of Gabonjin

- Location within Croatia
- Coordinates: 45°06′N 14°33′E
- Country: Croatia
- County: Primorje-Gorski Kotar
- Municipality: Dobrinj

Area
  - Total: 4.0 km^{2} (1.5 sq mi)

Population (2021)
  - Total: 191
  - Density: 48/km^{2} (120/sq mi)
- Time zone: UTC+1 (CET)
  - Summer (DST): UTC+2 (CEST)

Gabonjin is a village in the middle of the island Krk in Croatia. As of 2021, it had a population of 191. It is part of the municipality of Dobrinj.

== Governance ==
=== Local ===
It is the seat of its own local committee.
