= Vinišće =

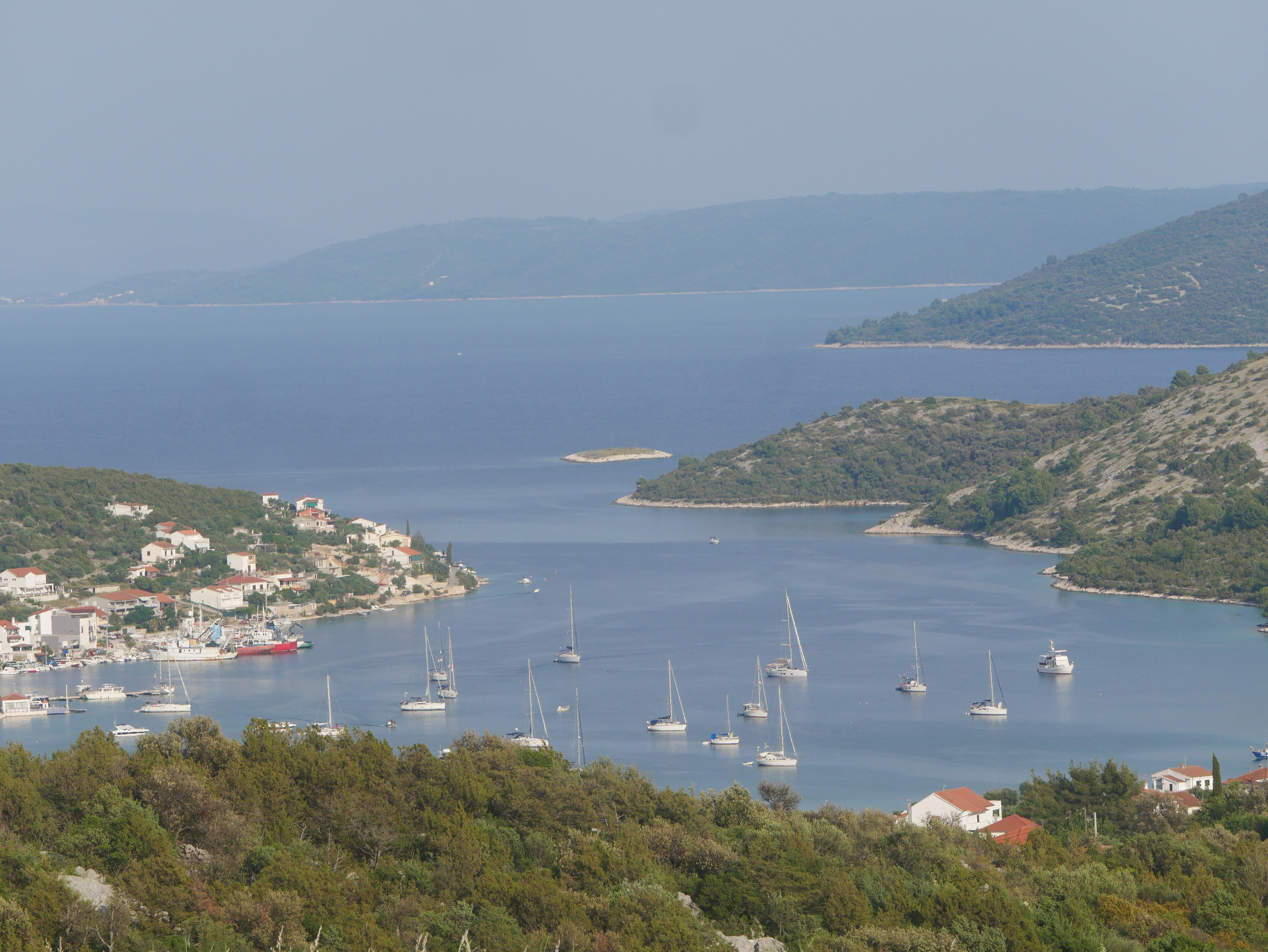

- Location of Vinišće in Croatia
- Coordinates: 43°29′N 16°07′E
- Country: Croatia
- County: Split-Dalmatia County

Area
  - Total: 25.4 km^{2} (9.8 sq mi)

Population (2021)
  - Total: 660
  - Density: 26/km^{2} (67/sq mi)

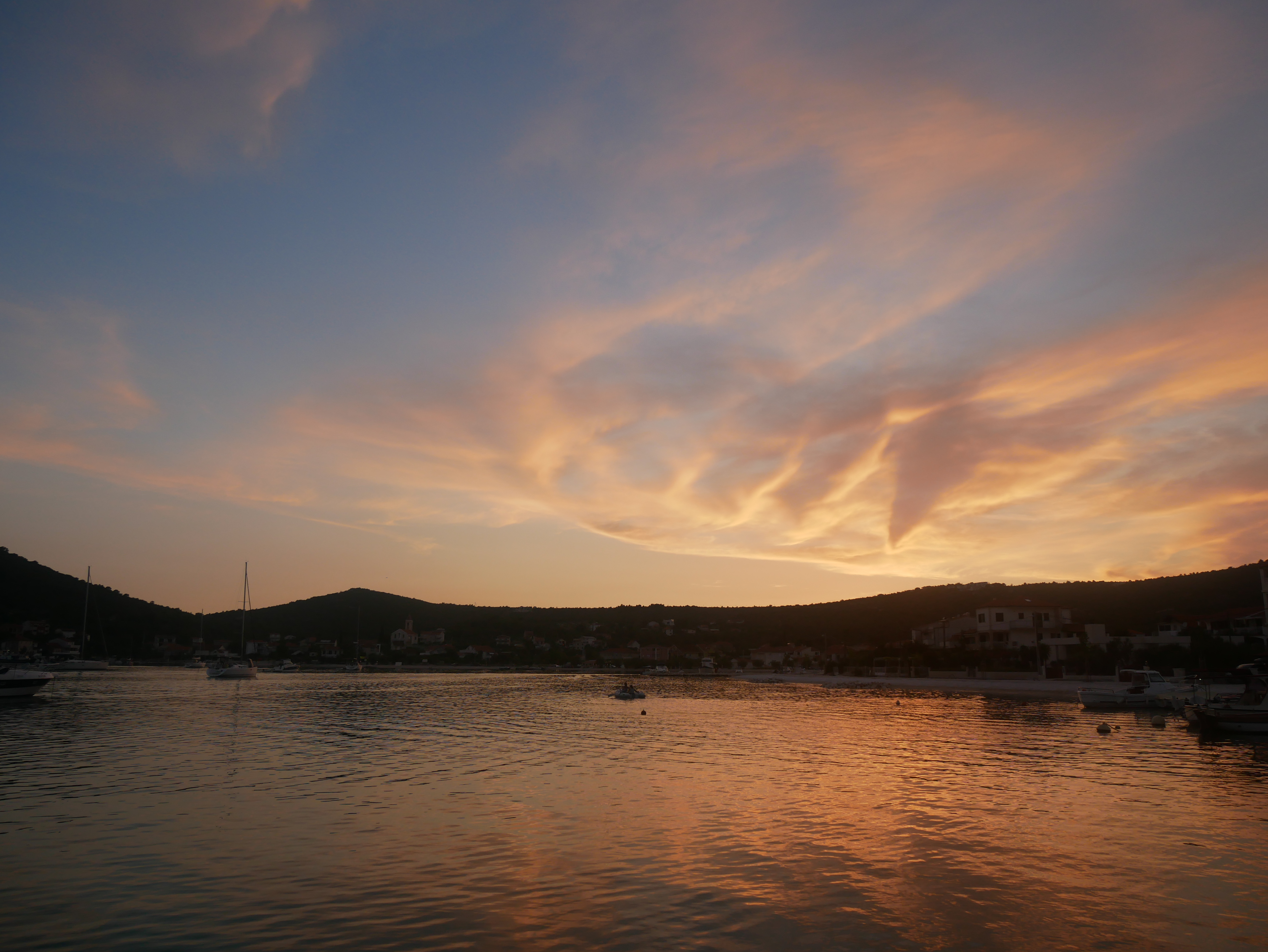
Sunset in Vinisce

Vinišće is a village and small harbour 12 km southwest of Trogir, Croatia; population 774 (2011 census). Its main occupations are fishing and tourism. The coastal strip near the village provides opportunities for underwater fishing and is distinguished by inlets with sandy and pebble beaches.

== Notable people ==
- Giovanni Dalmata
