= Lokva Rogoznica =

Settlement in Split-Dalmatia County, Croatia

- Settlement
- Interactive map of Lokva Rogoznica
- Location of Lokva Rogoznica in Croatia
- Coordinates: 43°24′54″N 16°46′09″E
- Country: Croatia
- County: Split-Dalmatia
- City: Omiš

Area
  - Total: 5.1 km^{2} (2.0 sq mi)

Population (2021)
  - Total: 334
  - Density: 65/km^{2} (170/sq mi)
- Time zone: UTC+1 (CET)
  - Summer (DST): UTC+2 (CEST)
- Postal code: 21310 Omiš
- Area code: +385 (0)21

Lokva Rogoznica is a settlement in the City of Omiš in Croatia. In 2021, its population was 334.

== Demographics ==
Lokva Rogoznica: Population trends 1857–2021
v

population	569	757	704	763	945	911	1368	1376	472	448	432	378	318	283	392	397	334
	1857	1869	1880	1890	1900	1910	1921	1931	1948	1953	1961	1971	1981	1991	2001	2011	2021

Sources: Croatian Bureau of Statistics publications
