= Sveti Vid Dobrinjski =

- Village
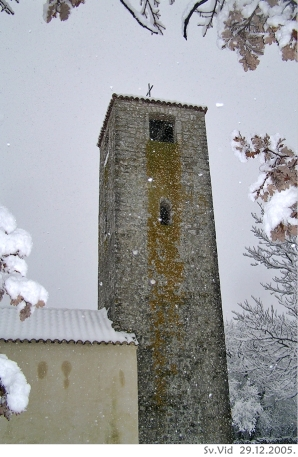
- St. Vitus Church

- Location within Krk Location within Croatia
- Coordinates: 45.12708°N 14.61665°E
- Country: Croatia
- County: Primorje-Gorski Kotar
- Municipality: Dobrinj

Area
  - Total: 1.5 km^{2} (0.58 sq mi)

Population (2021)
  - Total: 64
  - Density: 43/km^{2} (110/sq mi)
- Time zone: UTC+1 (CET)
  - Summer (DST): UTC+2 (CEST)

Sveti Vid Dobrinjski is a village on the Croatian island of Krk. Located just to the southeast of Dobrinj, it is also part of the municipality of Dobrinj. As of 2021, it had 64 inhabitants. There is a church in the village devoted to Saint Vitus.

== Governance ==
=== Local ===
It is the seat of the Local Committee of Sveti Vid - Gostinjac, encompassing itself and Gostinjac.
