= Soline, Dobrinj =

Soline
- Village
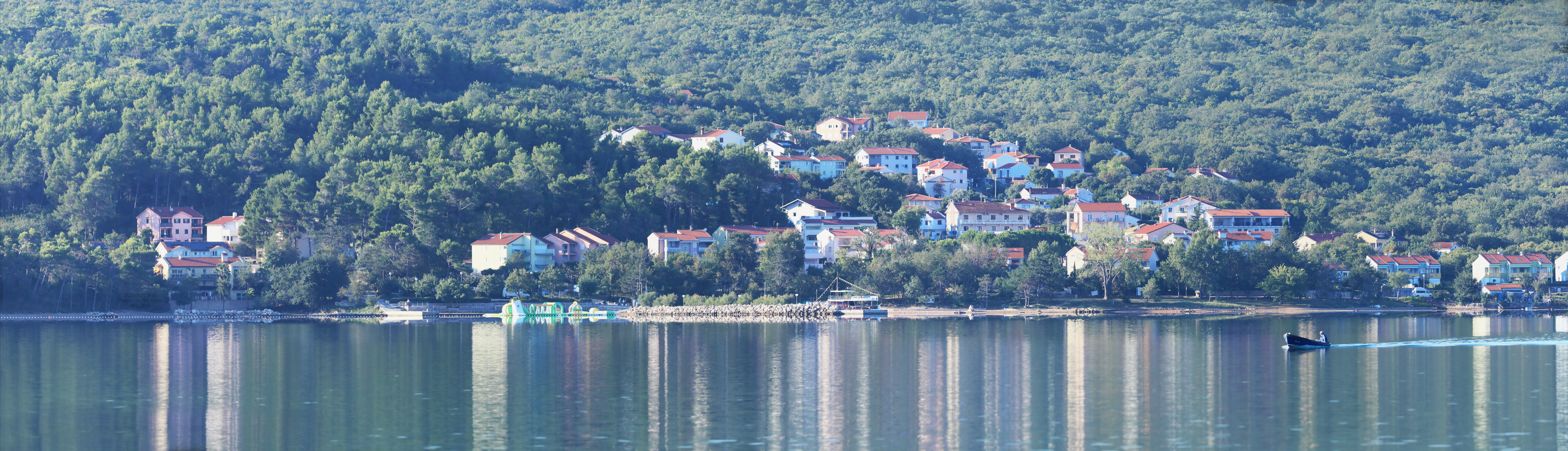
- Soline. Dobrinj. Island Krk.

- Location within Krk Location within Croatia
- Coordinates: 45.14799°N 14.60761°E
- Country: Croatia
- County: Primorje-Gorski Kotar
- Municipality: Dobrinj

Area
  - Total: 2.4 km^{2} (0.93 sq mi)

Population (2021)
  - Total: 48
  - Density: 20/km^{2} (52/sq mi)
- Time zone: UTC+1 (CET)
  - Summer (DST): UTC+2 (CEST)

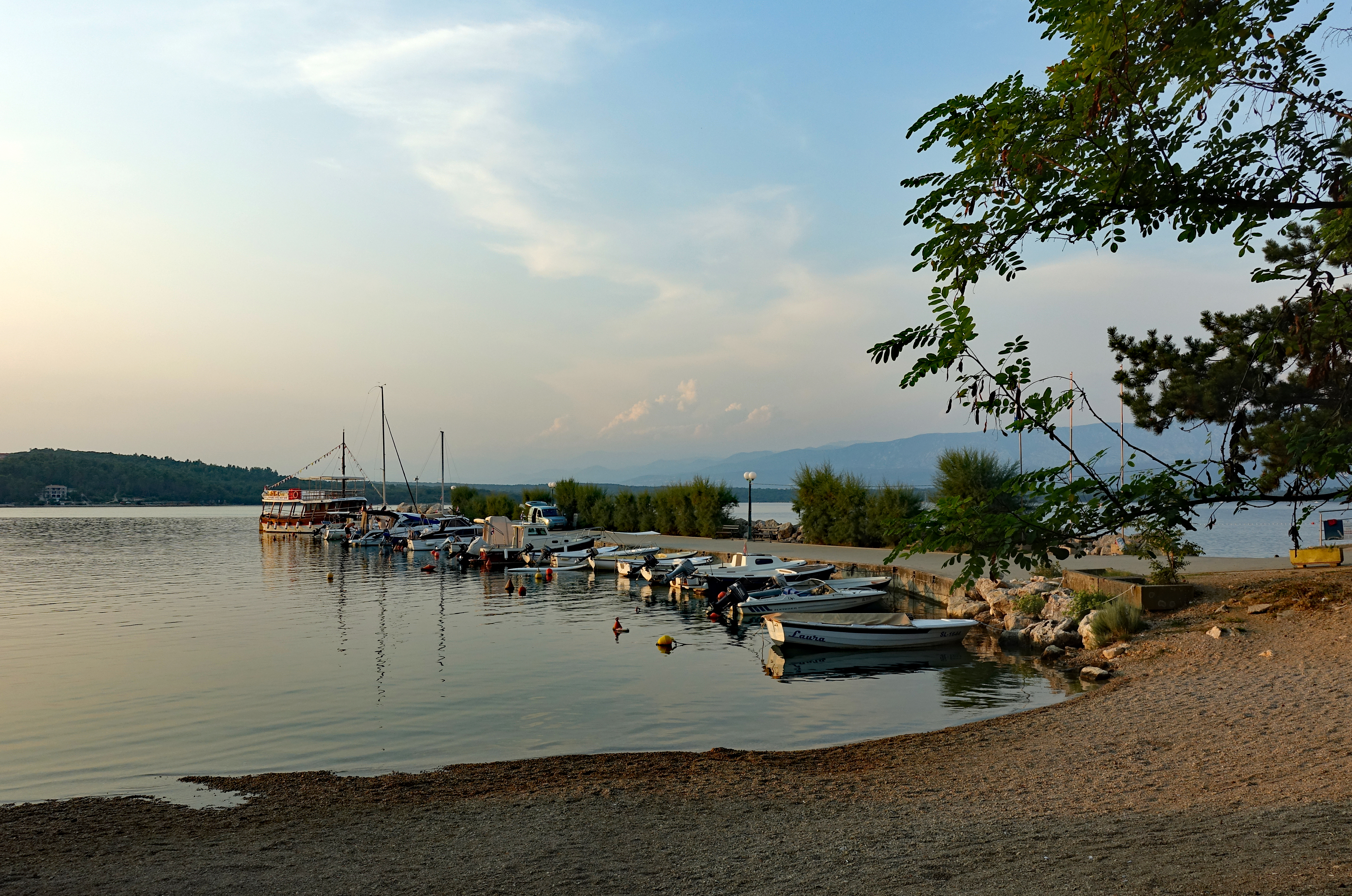
Soline Beach

Soline is a village located on the northeastern part of the Croatian island of Krk. It is part of the municipality of Dobrinj. As of 2021, it had 48 inhabitants. The village has a harbor providing access to the Soline Bay and the Vinodol Channel, of which the first is named after the settlement. The village of Čižići is located on the opposite side of the bay, and the village of Klimno is to the northeast of Soline.

== Governance ==
=== Local ===
It is the seat of its own local committee.
