= Kras, Krk =

Kras
- Village
- Location within Krk Location within Croatia
- Coordinates: 45.10662°N 14.60020°E
- Country: Croatia
- County: Primorje-Gorski Kotar
- Municipality: Dobrinj

Area
  - Total: 4.8 km^{2} (1.9 sq mi)

Population (2021)
  - Total: 227
  - Density: 47/km^{2} (120/sq mi)
- Time zone: UTC+1 (CET)
  - Summer (DST): UTC+2 (CEST)

Kras is a small village on the Croatian island of Krk. It is part of the municipality of Dobrinj. As of 2021, Kras had 227 inhabitants. Dolovo, a ghost village, is located just to the northeast of Kras.

== Governance ==
=== Local ===
It is the seat of its own local committee.

== Notable people ==
- Bonaventura Duda, theologian and scholar
