= Bible translations into Croatian =

Bible translations into Croatian started to appear in fragments in the 14th century. Efforts to make a complete translation started in the 16th century. The first published complete translations were made in the 19th century.

== 14th to 18th century ==
The oldest known lectionary is a fragment from 14th-century Korčula written in Latin script.

Small parts of the Bible translated to the Ikavian Shtokavian dialect, in Bosnian Cyrillic alphabet, appeared in the 1404 Hval Manuscript.

One Bernardin of Split printed the first Croatian lectionary in Venice in 1495.

A team of Protestant Croats conducted the first efforts to prepare a Bible translated into Croatian, when a New Testament translated by Antun Dalmatin and Stipan Konzul was printed at Tübingen in Glagolitic in 1561/62 and in Cyrillic in 1563, and the Old Testament Books of the Prophets in Glagolitic and Latin in 1564.

Jesuit Bartol Kašić translated the complete Bible 1622-1638, but his translation remained, due to political reasons, unpublished until 1999.

In the 17th century, efforts were made to produce a translation for the Catholic Croats and Serbians in the so-called Illyrian dialect, but nothing was printed until the 19th century when a Bible in Latin letters together with the parallel text of the Vulgate was translated into the Illyric language, Bosnian dialect by Matija Petar Katančić. It was published at Budapest (6 parts, 1831) and closely follows the Vulgate.

== 19th century ==
In the 19th century the Bishop of Zagreb Maksimilijan Vrhovac proposed the translation of the Bible in Kajkavian. The following are translations: Ivan Rupert Gusić translated the Gospels, Acts of Apostles, Epistles to the Romans and Corinthians, and the Apocalypse; Ivan Birling translated the Epistle to the Philippians; Stjepan Korolija worked the entire New Testament (the manuscripts today in the Metropolitanska knjižnica Zagreb); Antun Vranić's worked the Psalms and Lamentations of Jeremiah; Ivan Nepomuk Labaš translated the book of Job.

Ignac Kristijanović tried to continue the translation of Kajkavian Bible. His works: the Gospels, Act of Apostles, Epistles to the Romans and Corinthians, the Psalms, Ruth's Book, Proverbs, Ecclesiastes, Job's Book, Jonah's Book, Tobit's Book, Judith's Book, Sirach, Book of Wisdom, Epistles of Peter, Epistles of John and Epistles of Jude.

== 20th century to present ==
In 1968 a Zagreb publishing company Stvarnost issued a Croatian translation of the entire Bible (editors B. Duda i Jure Kaštelan). The same translation in its third and subsequent editions has been issued by Kršćanska sadašnjost since 1972.

Croatian actor Vid Balog translated the entire New Testament into the Kajkavian dialect of Croatian.

Martin Meršić and Ivan Jakšić translated the entire Bible into the Burgenland Croatian.

Jehovah's Witnesses have translated their New World Translation of the Holy Scriptures into Croatian.

Tomislav Dretar translated the Jerusalem Bible and the Ecumenical Translation of the Bible into the Croatian language.

== See also ==
- Bible translations into Slavic languages

== Bibliography ==
- Jambrek, Stanko (2007). "The Bible Among the Croatian People: Translating, printing and distributing the Bible in the context of proclaiming the Gospel" (PDF). Kairos: Evangelical Journal of Theology. 1 (1): 47–79. ISSN 1846-4580.
- Jambrek, Stanko (May 2011). "Contributions for Studying the Reformation in the Croatian Historic Lands" (PDF). Kairos: Evangelical Journal of Theology. 5 (1): 145–150. ISSN 1846-4580.
