= Soline Bay =

- Uvala Soline (Croatian)
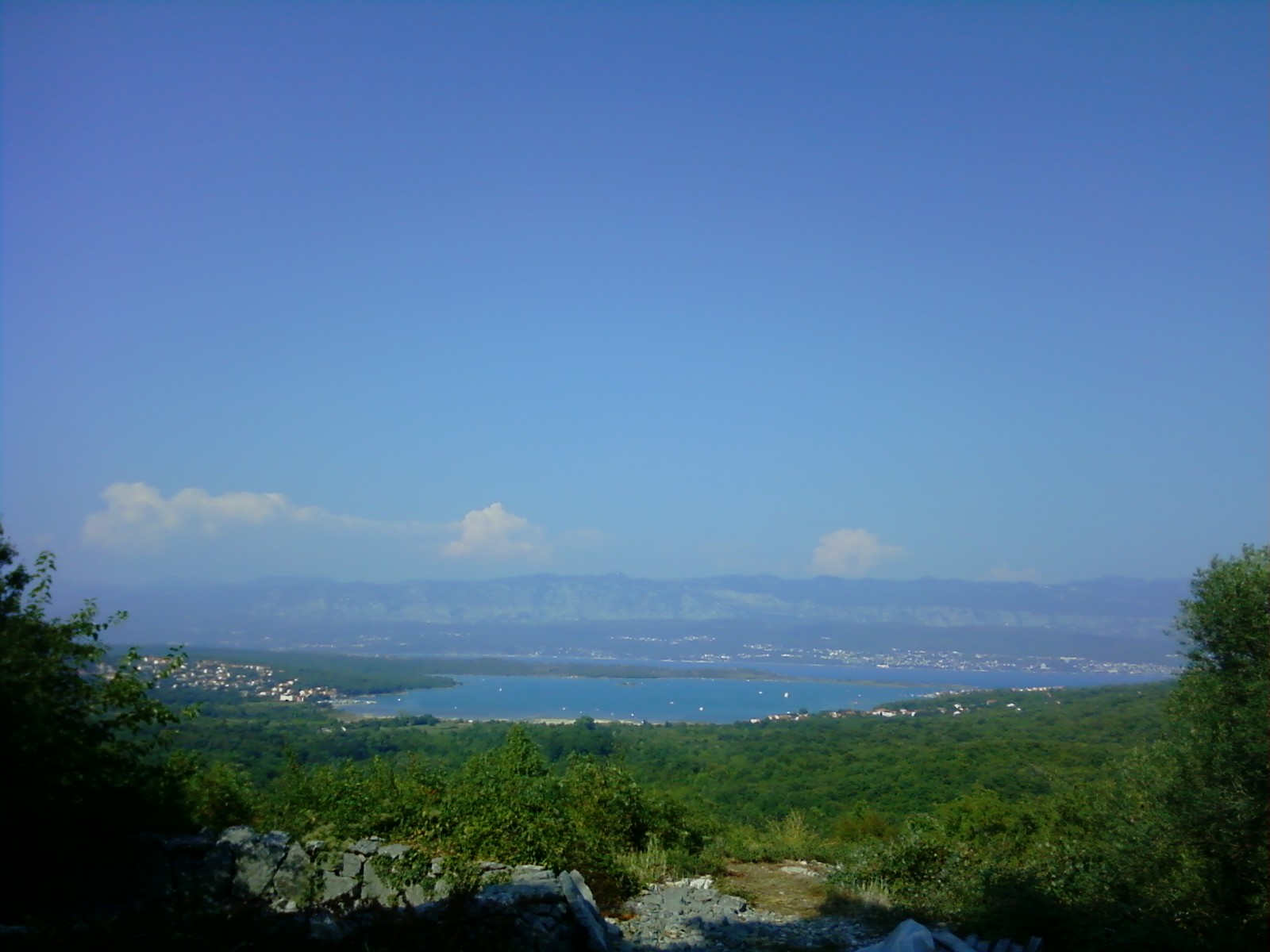
- Soline Bay from the west

- Location within Krk Location within Croatia
- Coordinates: 45.16007°N 14.61169°E
- Type: bay
- Islands: Školjić Veli and Školjić Mali
- Settlements: Čižići, Klimno, and Soline

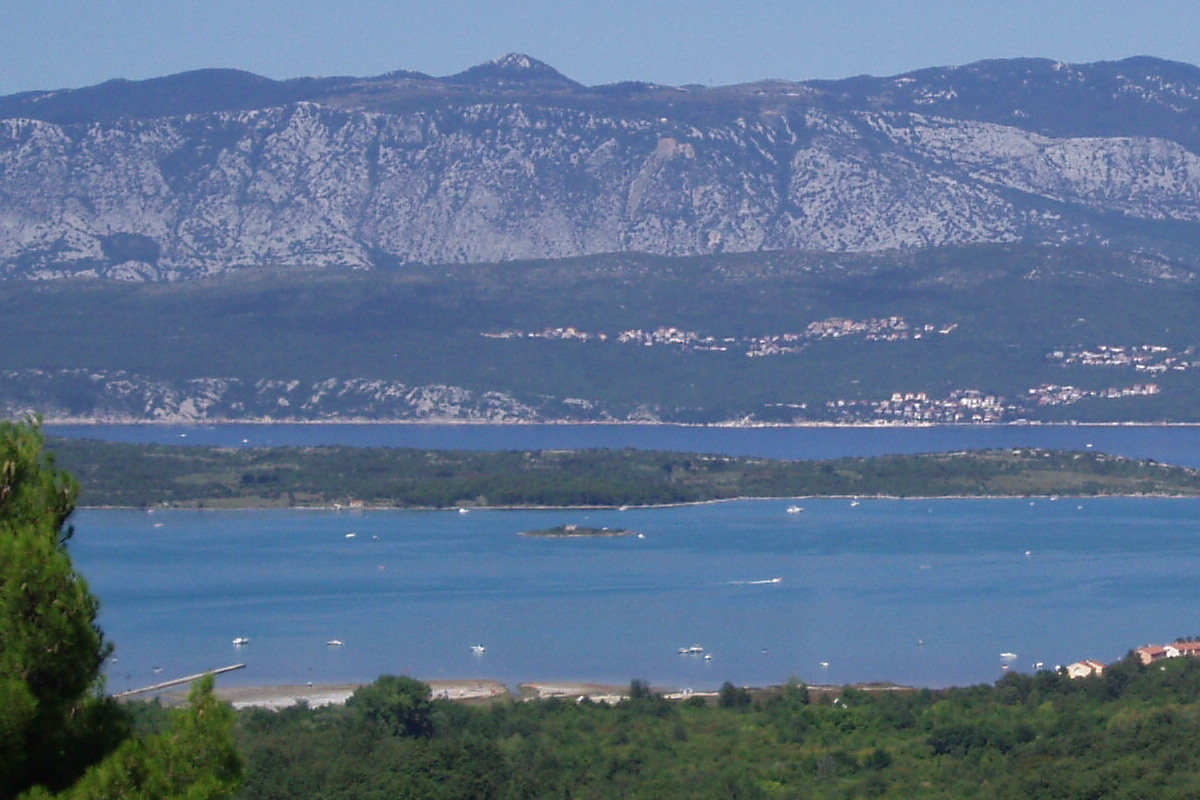
View of Školjić Veli

Soline Bay or Soline Cove (Croatian: Uvala Soline) is a bay located on the northeast side of the Croatian island of Krk. The bay flows into the Vinodol Channel, part of the Adriatic Sea. Three villages are centered on Soline Bay: Čižići, Klimno, and Soline, after which it is named. There are two islands inside the bay, Školjić Veli and the much smaller islet Školjić Mali just to the north of Klimno. Meline Beach (Croatian: Plaža Meline) is a muddy beach located on the southern end of the bay which attracts many visitors for therapeutic reasons.
