= Gostinjac =

Gostinjac Gostinjoc
- Village
- Location within Krk Location within Croatia
- Coordinates: 45.12157°N 14.62890°E
- Country: Croatia
- County: Primorje-Gorski Kotar
- Municipality: Dobrinj

Area
  - Total: 2.6 km^{2} (1.0 sq mi)

Population (2021)
  - Total: 94
  - Density: 36/km^{2} (94/sq mi)
- Time zone: UTC+1 (CET)
  - Summer (DST): UTC+2 (CEST)

Gostinjac (Chakavian: Gostinjoc) is a village located on the Croatian island of Krk. It is part of the municipality of Dobrinj. As of 2021, it had 94 inhabitants. There is a church in the village devoted to Saint Martin.
