= Polje (Krk) =

- Village
- Location within Krk Location within Croatia
- Coordinates: 45.134722°N 14.642778°E
- Country: Croatia
- County: Primorje-Gorski Kotar
- Municipality: Dobrinj

Area
  - Total: 5.9 km^{2} (2.3 sq mi)

Population (2021)
  - Total: 285
  - Density: 48/km^{2} (130/sq mi)
- Time zone: UTC+1 (CET)
  - Summer (DST): UTC+2 (CEST)

Polje (Croatian pronunciation: [pôʎe]) is a village located on the northeast of the island Krk. It is part of the municipality of Dobrinj. As of 2021, it had 285 inhabitants.

== Religion ==
Its Catholic chaplaincy was made independent in 1903, and its chapel was built 1879. In 1939, its parish had 1103 souls, plus 30 outside the country.

List of chaplains of Polje:

- Aleksandar Uravić (b. Dobrinj 1876-02-26, primiz Krk 1903-03-02)

== Governance ==
=== Local ===
It is the seat of the Local Committee of Polje, encompassing itself and Žestilac.

== Bibliography ==
- Draganović, Krunoslav (1939-04-20). Opći šematizam Katoličke crkve u Jugoslaviji. Sarajevo: Akademija "Regina Apostolorum".
