= Vinodol Channel =

Coordinates: 45°09′41″N 14°40′20″E

Location
- Interactive map of Vinodol Channel

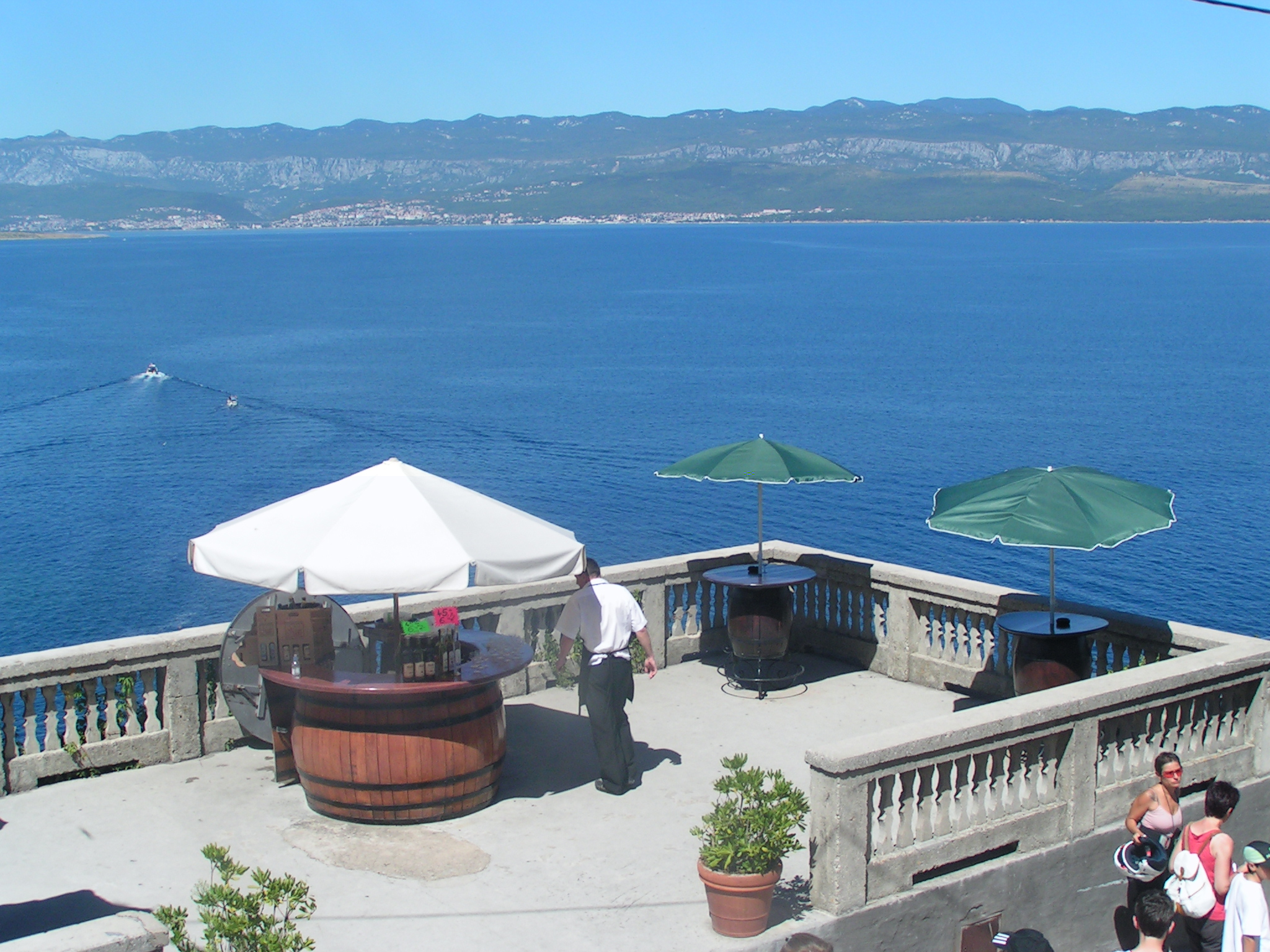
View from Vrbnik towards the Vinodol Channel

Vinodol Channel (Italian: Canale Meltempo or Maltempo) is a channel between the island of Krk and the Croatian coastline proceeding past Jadranovo, Dramalj, and Crikvenica to Novi Vinodolski.
