= D102 road =

Road in Croatia

D102 state road

Route information
- Length: 48.3 km (30.0 mi)

Major junctions
- From: D8 / D523 near Šmrika
- D103 near Rijeka Airport; D104 near Malinska
- To: Baška

Location
- Country: Croatia
- Counties: Primorje-Gorski Kotar
- Major cities: Omišalj, Malinska, Krk

Highway system
- Highways in Croatia

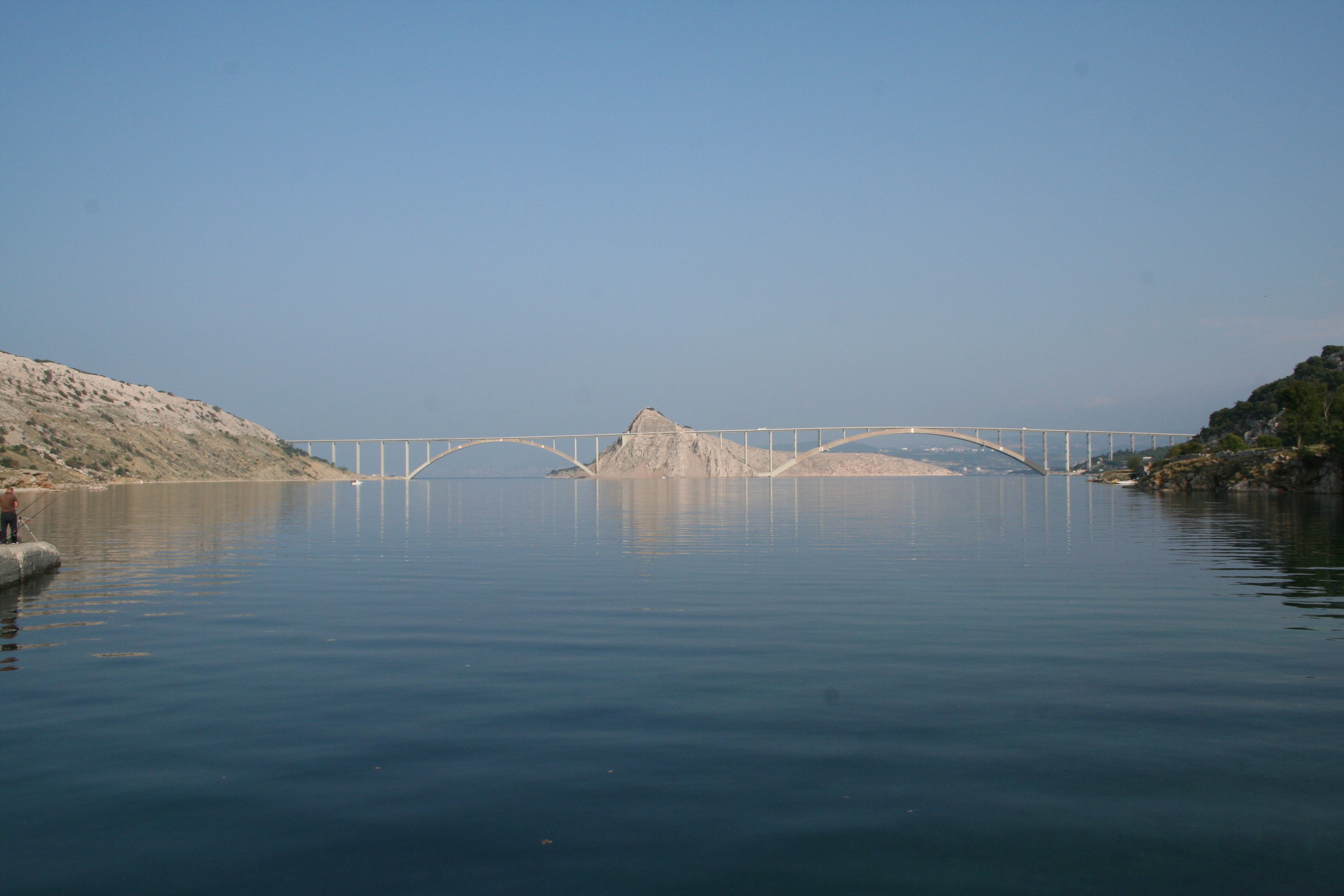
Krk bridge, carrying the D102 state road

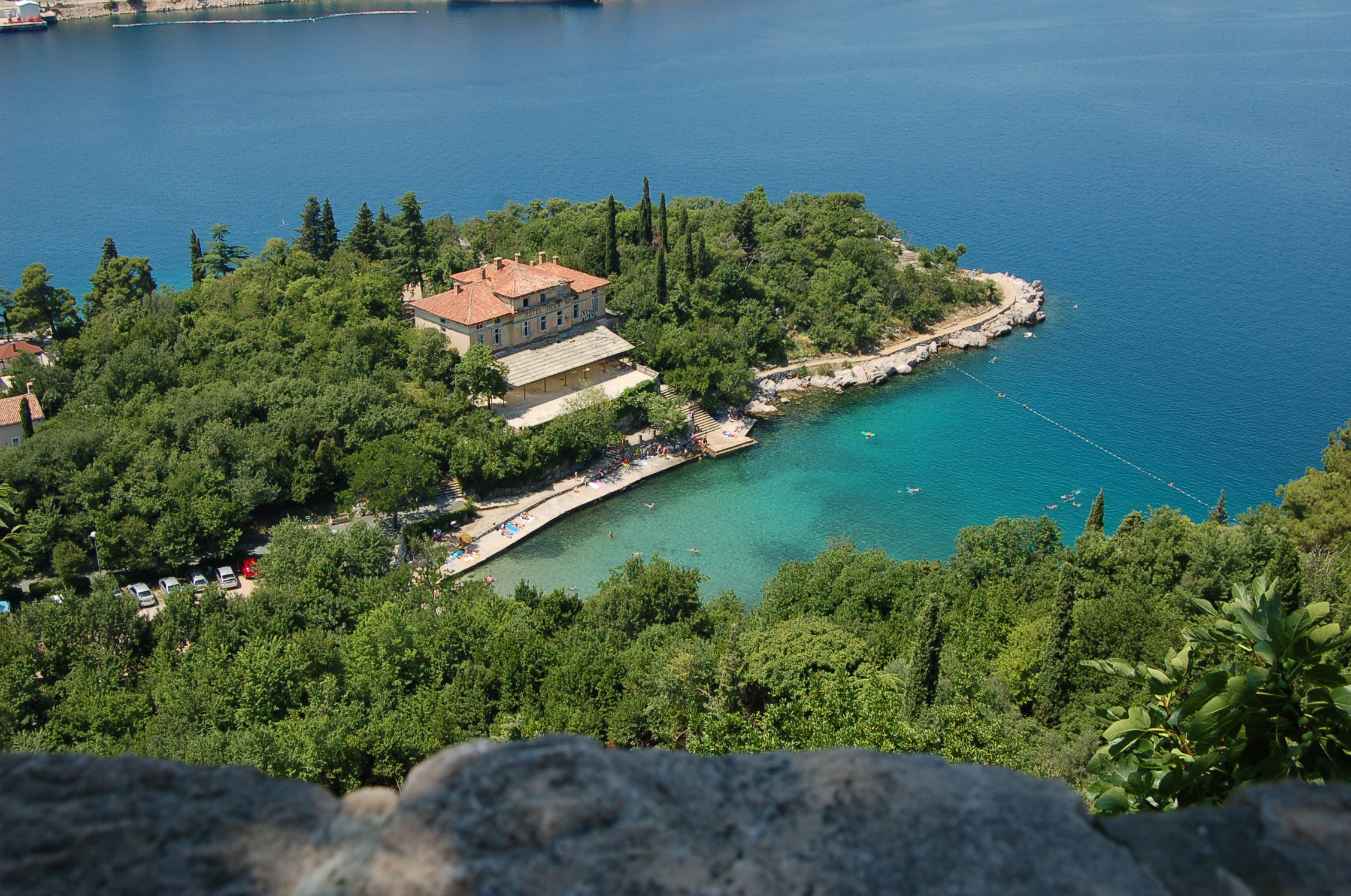
Omišalj, next to the D102 route

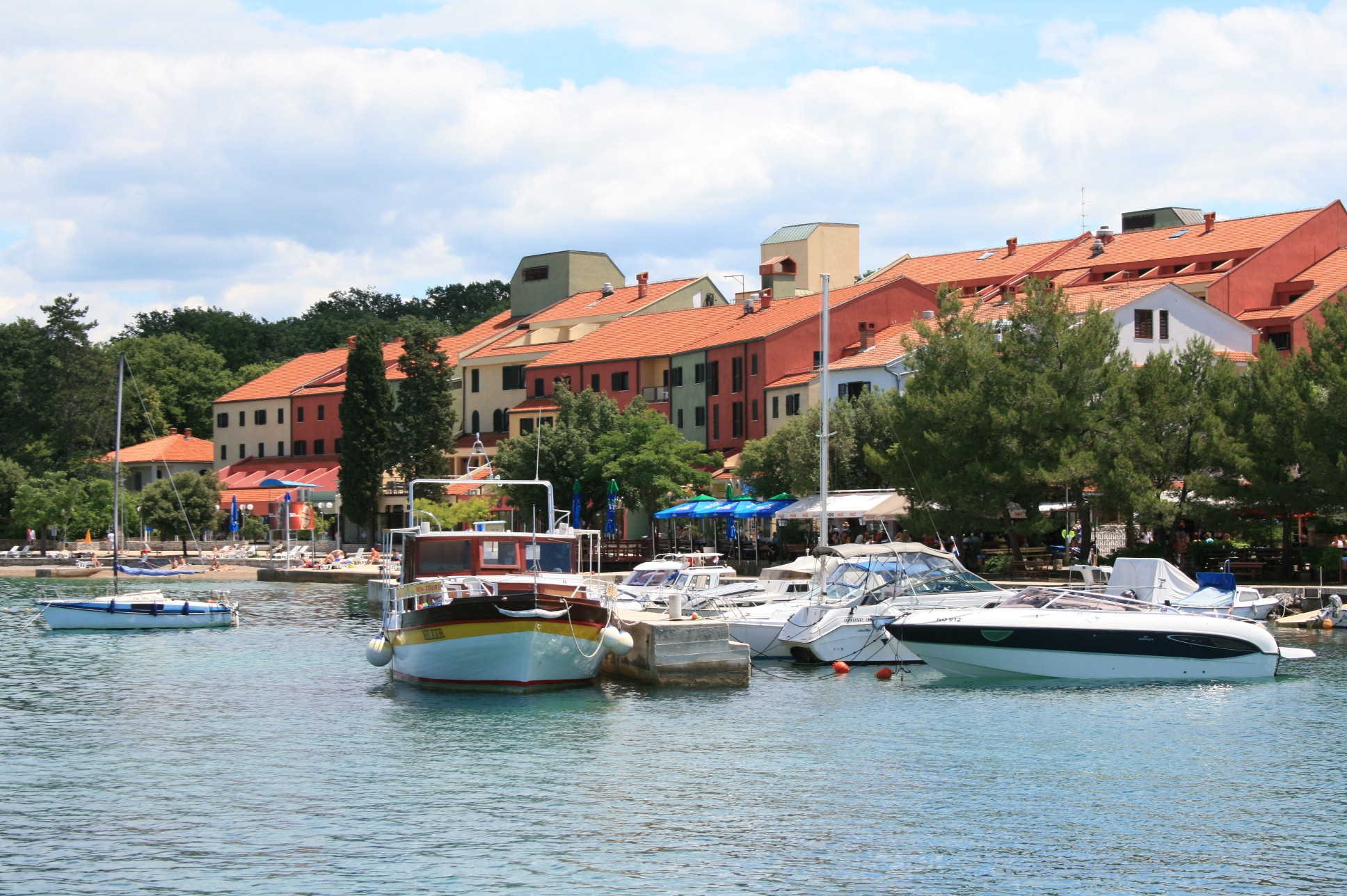
Njivice, next to the D102 route

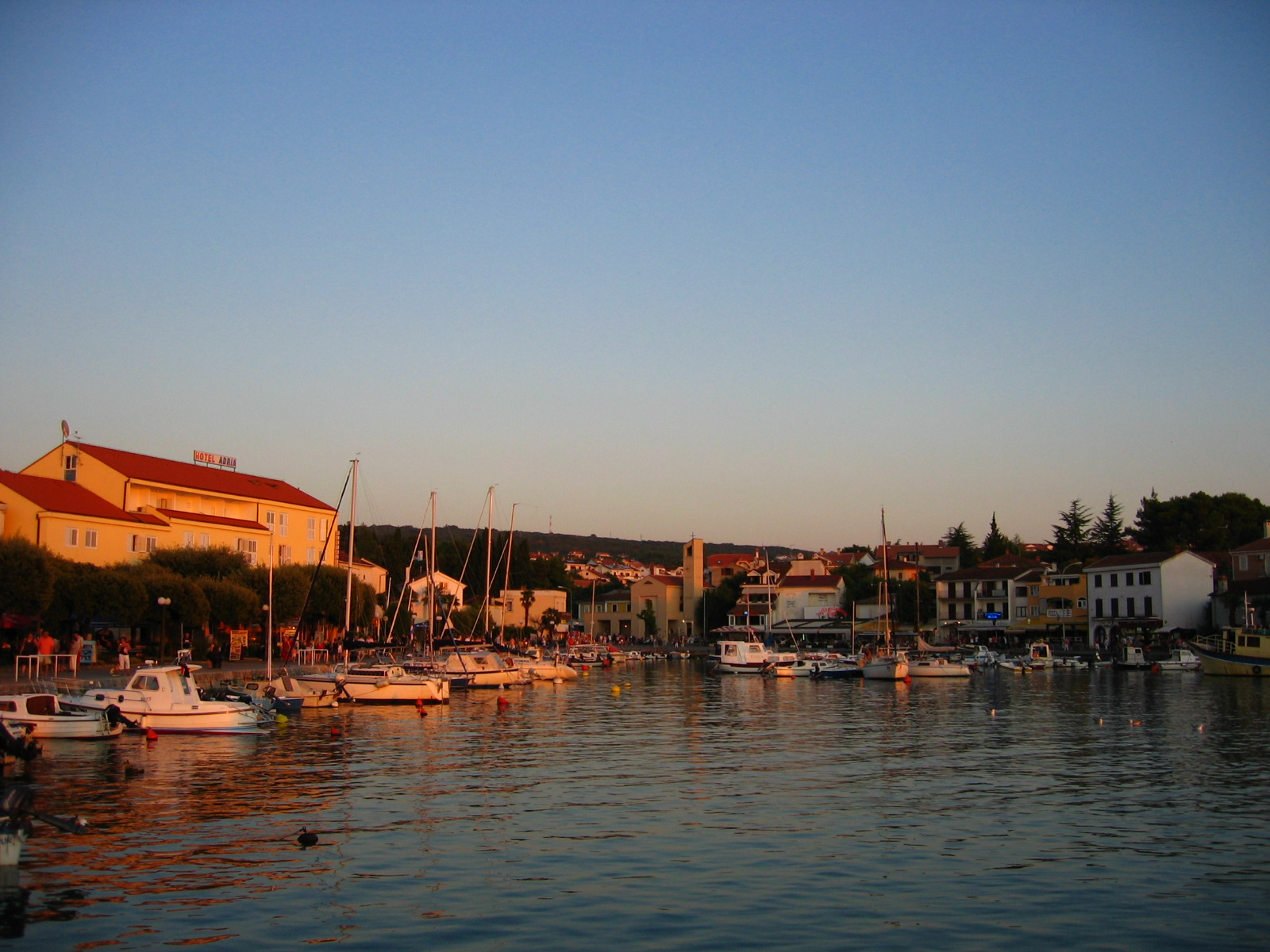
Malinska, next to the D102 route

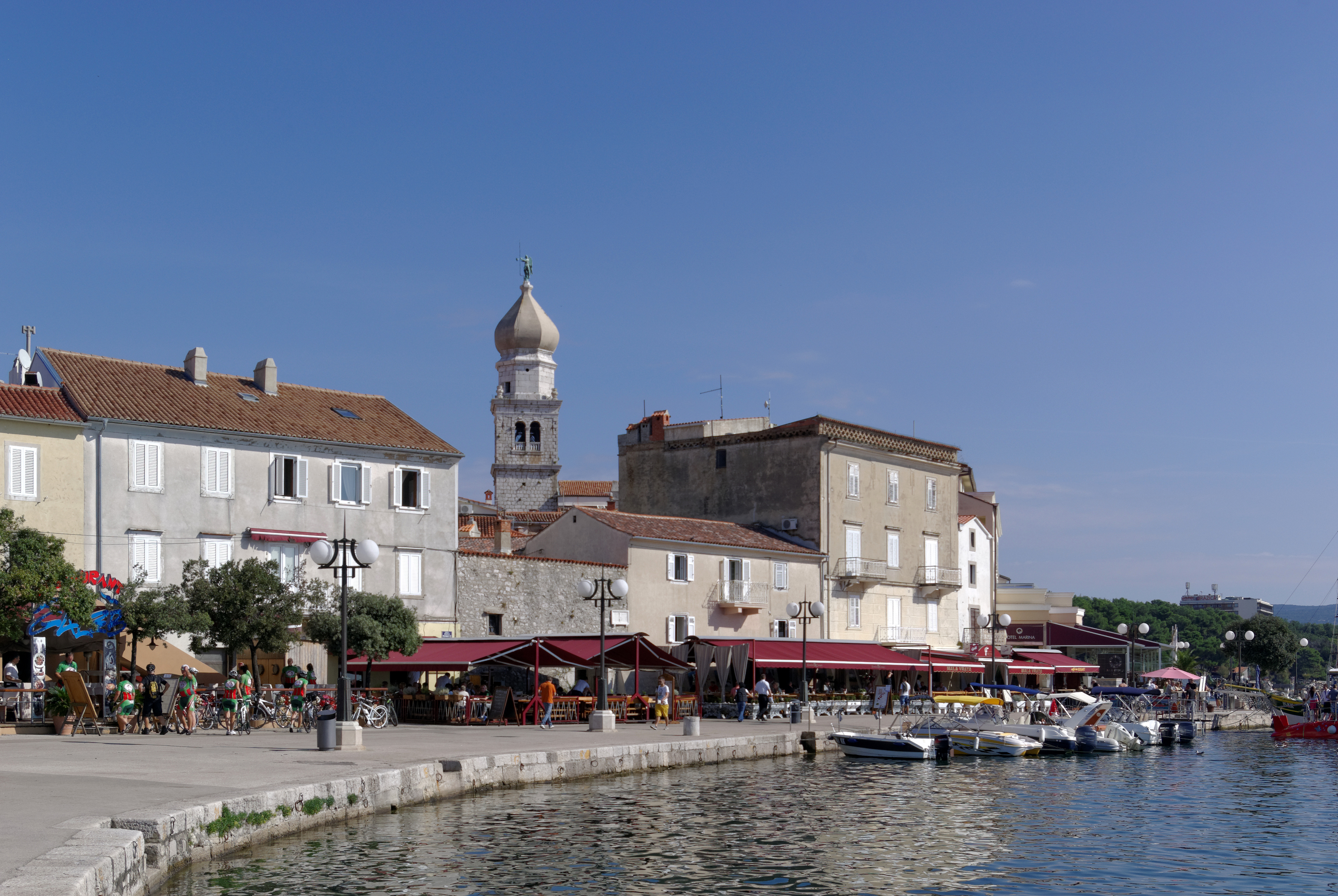
the city of Krk, next to the D102 route

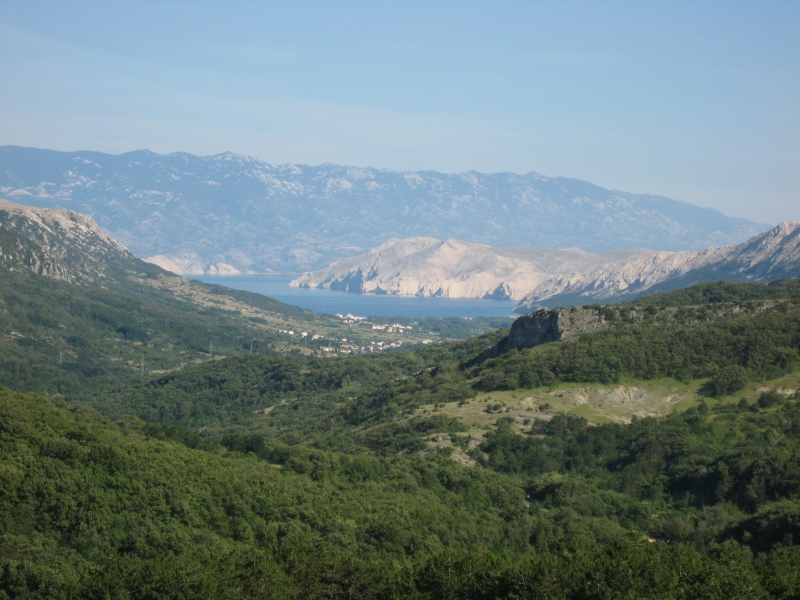
view from Treskavac pass (319 m) towards Draga Bašćanska and Baška

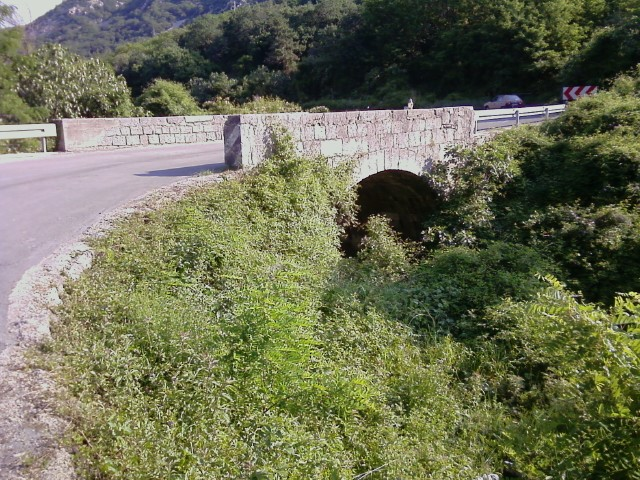
old stone bridge over Suha Ričina, where the D102 route passes the only permanent river on the island of Krk

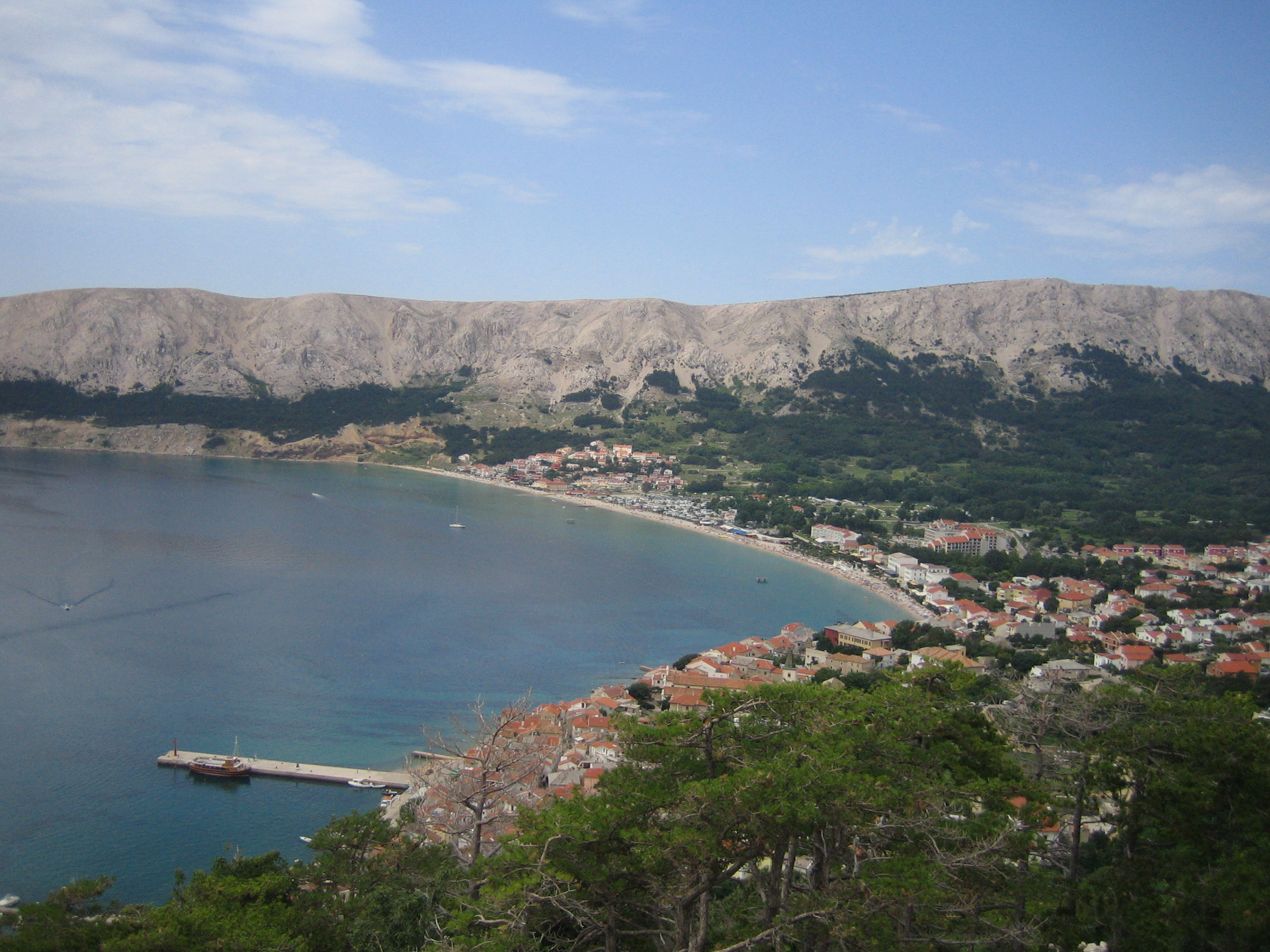
Baška, at the southern terminus of D102

D102 is a state road connecting the mainland to island of Krk and terminating at the southern tip of the island in Baška. The road is 48.3 km long.

D102 is the main road route on the island of Krk. The northern terminus of the road is located near Kraljevica, at an intersection with D8 state route - the Adriatic Highway. The road includes Krk bridge.

In the northern part of the island, between Omišalj and Malinska it runs parallel to the shore at a distance of approximately 2 km. In that section, short D103 state road connects D102 to Rijeka Airport. Further to the south, D102 extends through the centre of the island to the city of Krk. In that section, another state road, D104 branches off to the southwest towards Valbiska ferry port. D102 bypasses the city of Krk, and proceeds southeast to Baška.

The road, as well as all other state roads in Croatia, is managed and maintained by Hrvatske ceste, a state-owned company. However, Krk Bridge is managed by Autocesta Rijeka - Zagreb company.

== Traffic volume ==
Map of Krk showing D102

Traffic is regularly counted and reported by Hrvatske ceste, operator of the road. Substantial variations between annual (AADT) and summer (ASDT) traffic volumes are attributed to the fact that the road serves as a connection to A6 motorway and D8 state road carrying substantial tourist traffic.

D102 traffic volume
Road	Counting site	AADT	ASDT	Notes
D102	2919 Krk Bridge	9,660	19,060	Values estimated by HC.
D102	2922 Omišalj	8,326	14,804	Between Ž5083 and L58065 junctions.
D102	2924 Sveti Vid	8,976	19,387	Between Ž5084 and Ž5086 junctions.
D102	2934 Krk	3,762	8,335	Between two Ž5131 junctions.
D102	2930 Kornić	5,691	14,885	Between Ž5131 (east) and L58091 junctions.

== Road junctions and populated areas ==
D102 junctions/populated areas/toll plazas
Type	Slip roads/Notes
	D523 - Connection to Križišće, and further on to D501 and A6 motorway. D8 - Connection to Rijeka and A7 motorway (to the west) and to Crikvenica and Novi Vinodolski (to the east). Northern terminus of the road. D102 northbound traffic defaults to D523.
	Ž5189 to Uvala Scott
	Krk Bridge toll plaza. Only southbound traffic is tolled.
	Krk Bridge - 1,430 m (4,690 ft) long reinforced concrete arch bridge.
	D103 to Rijeka Airport
	Ž5083 to Omišalj
	L58065 to Medermunići, Omišalj
	Ž5084 to Njivice
	Ž5086 to Malinska, Sv. Vid Miholjice and Porat
	Ž5087 to Malinska, Sv. Vid Miholjice, Dobrinj and Šilo
	D104 to Valbiska ferry port - Jadrolinija ferry access to Merag, island of Cres (D101) and Lopar, island of Rab (D105).
	Ž5106 to Vrh
	Ž5107 to Dobrinj and Šilo
	Ž5131 to Krk (west)
	Ž5131 to Krk (east) - Ž5131 loops from D102 to Krk and back further down D102.
	L58091 to Kornić
	Ž5125 to Punat and Stara Baška
	Ž5183 to Vrbnik
	Draga Bašćanska
	Jurandvor - L58098 junction in the village (to Batomalj).
	Baška - Southern terminus of the road.

== See also ==
Media related to Državna cesta 102 at Wikimedia Commons

- Hrvatske ceste
- Autocesta Rijeka - Zagreb
- Krk Bridge
