= D501 road =

Road in Croatia

D501 state road

Route information
- Length: 20.3 km (12.6 mi)

Major junctions
- From: D3 near Gornje Jelenje
- A6 in Oštrovica interchange D523 in Križišće
- To: D8 near Jadranovo

Location
- Country: Croatia
- Counties: Primorje-Gorski Kotar

Highway system
- Highways in Croatia

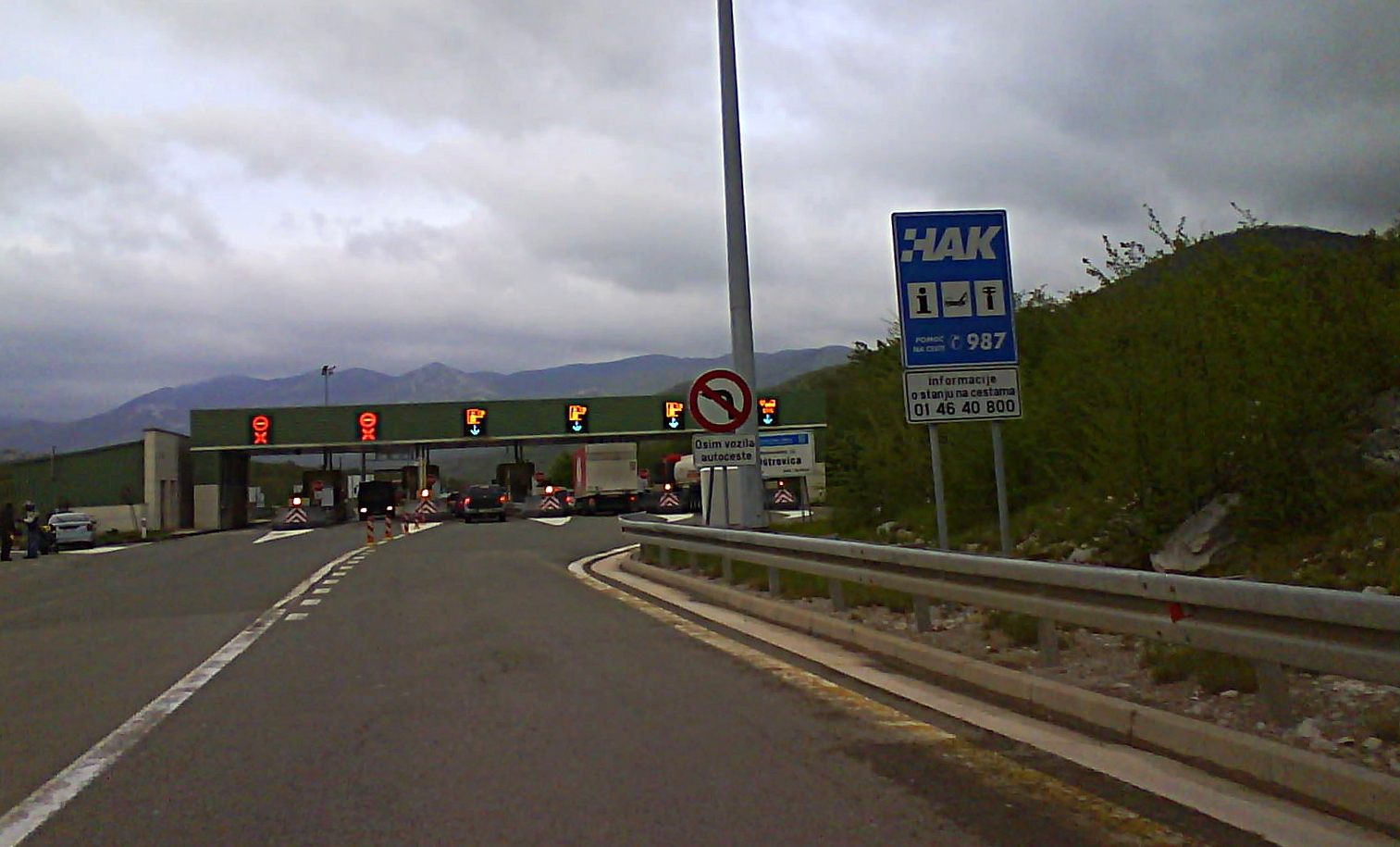
Oštrovica interchange toll plaza, access to D501

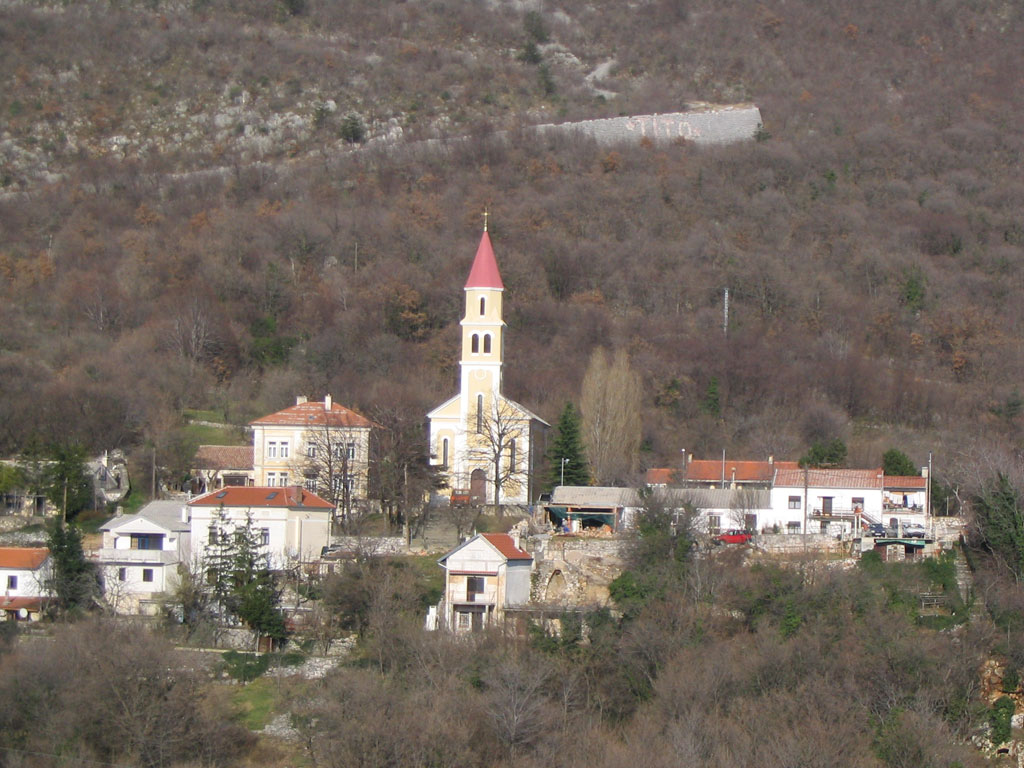
Križišće, where D501/523 junction is located

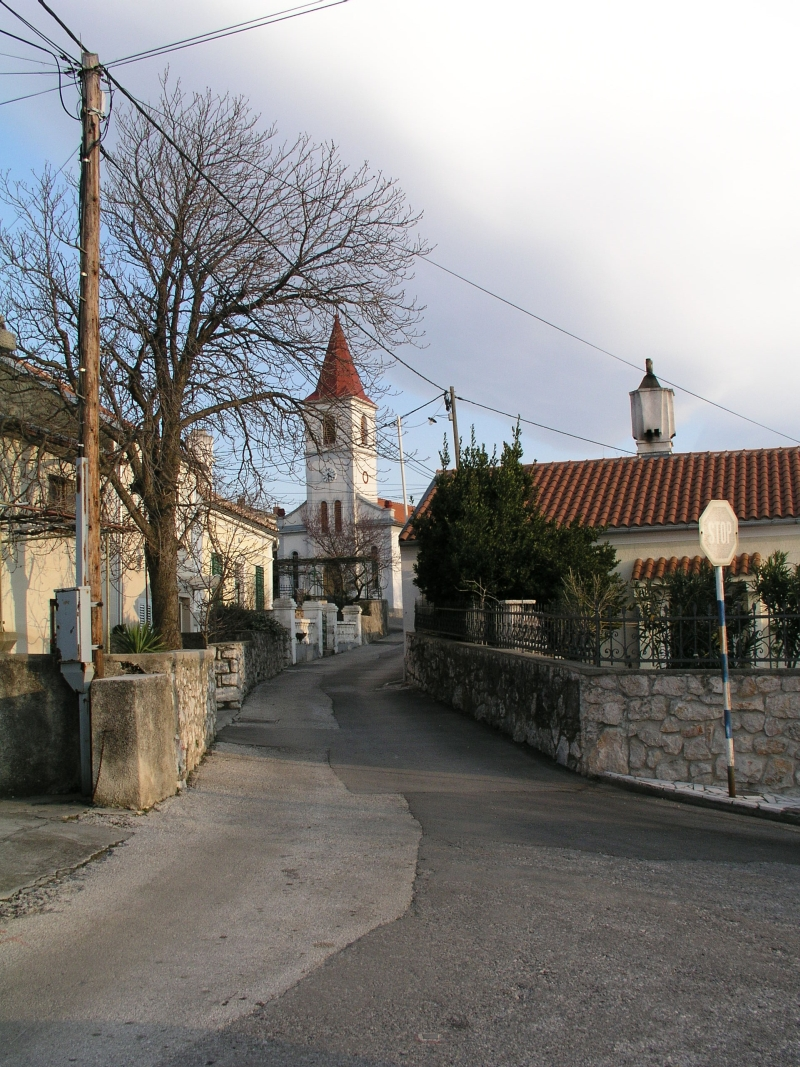
Šmrika, adjacent to the D501 state road

D501 is a state road connecting D3 state road and the A6 motorway Oštrovica interchange to littoral area between Kraljevica, Crikvenica and Novi Vinodolski as well as the island of Krk, terminating at D8 intersection near Jadranovo. The road is 20.3 km long.

D501 is a connecting route providing a link between two major state roads (D3 and D8) and one motorway (A6). An additional motorway interchange, to A7 is planned, in Meja interchange, which is currently under construction.

In Križišće, there is a junction with D523 state road, a route to Kraljevica, Krk bridge and D102 state road.

The road, as well as all other state roads in Croatia, is managed and maintained by Hrvatske ceste, state owned company.

== Traffic volume ==
Traffic is regularly counted and reported by Hrvatske ceste, operator of the road. Substantial variations between annual (AADT) and summer (ASDT) traffic volumes are attributed to the fact that the road serves as a connection to A6 motorway and D8 state road carrying substantial tourist traffic.

| Road | Counting site | AADT | ASDT | Notes |
|---|---|---|---|---|
| D501 | 2926 Oštrovica south | 5,017 | 7,686 | Adjacent to A6 interchange. |
| D501 | 2918 Križišće | 5,869 | 11,730 | Between Ž5063 and D523 junctions. |

== Road junctions and populated areas ==
| Location | Roads intersected | Notes |
|---|---|---|
| Gornje Jelenje (vicinity) | D3 | Northern terminus; D3 towards Grobnik and Rijeka (west) and Delnice and Karlovac (east) |
| Oštrovica | A6 | Oštrovica interchange; access to Rijeka and Zagreb via A1 |
| Meja | Ž5060 | Junction towards Bakar and D8 |
| | Ž5063 | Junction towards Hreljin |
| Križišće | D523 Ž5068 Ž5064 | D523 towards Krk via D102 and Kraljevica; Ž5068 towards Fužine; Ž5064 towards Drivenik Castle, Bribir and Novi Vinodolski |
| | L58057 | Junction towards Šmrika |
| Jadranovo (vicinity) | D8 | Southern terminus; D8 towards Crikvenica, Novi Vinodolski and Senj (east) and Rijeka (west) |

== See also ==
- Autocesta Rijeka - Zagreb
