= Njivice, Croatia =

Njivice
- Village
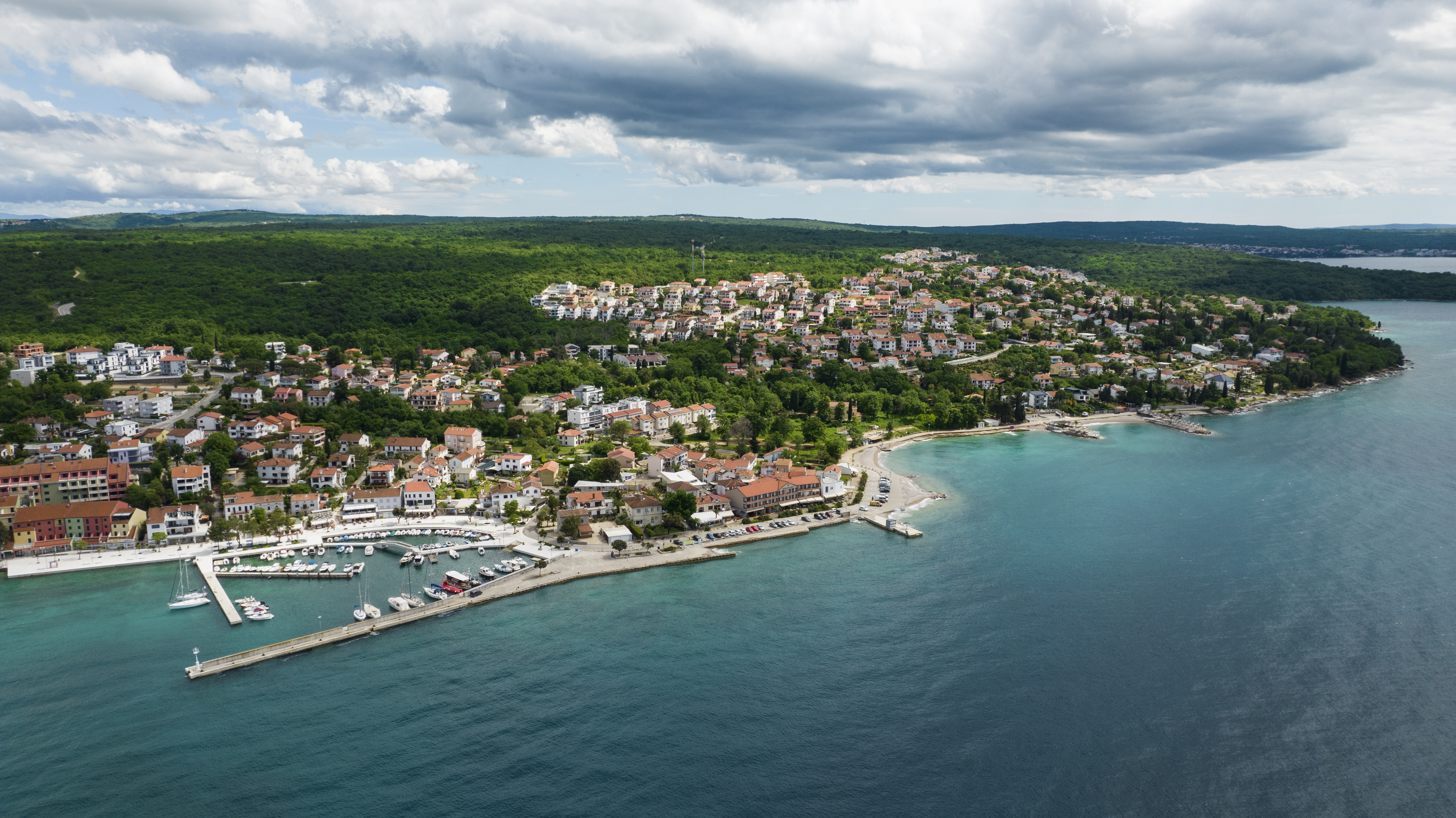
- Center of Njivice and harbor

- Location within Krk Location within Croatia
- Coordinates: 45°09′29″N 14°32′20″E
- Country: Croatia
- County: Primorje-Gorski Kotar
- Municipality: Omišalj

Area
  - Total: 6.7 km^{2} (2.6 sq mi)
- Elevation: 0 m (0 ft)

Population (2021)
  - Total: 1,115
  - Density: 170/km^{2} (430/sq mi)
- Time zone: UTC+1 (CET)
  - Summer (DST): UTC+2 (CEST)
- Postal code: 51512 Njivice
- Area code: +385 (0)51

Njivice is a village located on the island of Krk in Primorje-Gorski Kotar County, Croatia. According to the 2011 census, the village has a population of 1,115. It is located in the Omišalj municipality, 6 km south of Omišalj itself.

== Geography ==
The village is located on the north-west coast of the island of Krk.

== History ==
The first documentary mention of Njivice is found in a deed of donation of Count Ivan Frankopan drawn up in 1474. At that time it was a small fishing village, whereas nowadays the community is mostly known for tourism. Expansion as a tourist resort began in 1930, with the construction of Hotel Luka (today Hotel Jadran). Since the eighties the new housing estate of Kijac has also formed part of the village.

== Demographics ==
Villages and former villages under Njivice include:

- Sveti Martin

== Governance ==
It is the seat of its own local committee.

== Traffic ==
The D102 state road, running from the north of the island to the south, skirts the east of the village, connecting it with larger centres on Krk such as Omišalj, Malinska, Krk, Punat and Baška. The nearby Krk Bridge connects Njivice with the city of Rijeka on the mainland, via the D8 state road. Rijeka Airport is situated to the north, near Omišalj. The nearest train station is located in Rijeka.

== Tourism ==
Besides the construction of the hotel Luka (today Jadran), the villa Dinka has also played a part in the beginnings of tourism in Njivice. Visitors are most commonly attracted by the beaches, the blue sea, a lot of shaded places and local accommodation. Njivice is getting greater recognition year by year.

== Sports ==
Njivice has a boules club, the "Trstena".

== Gallery ==
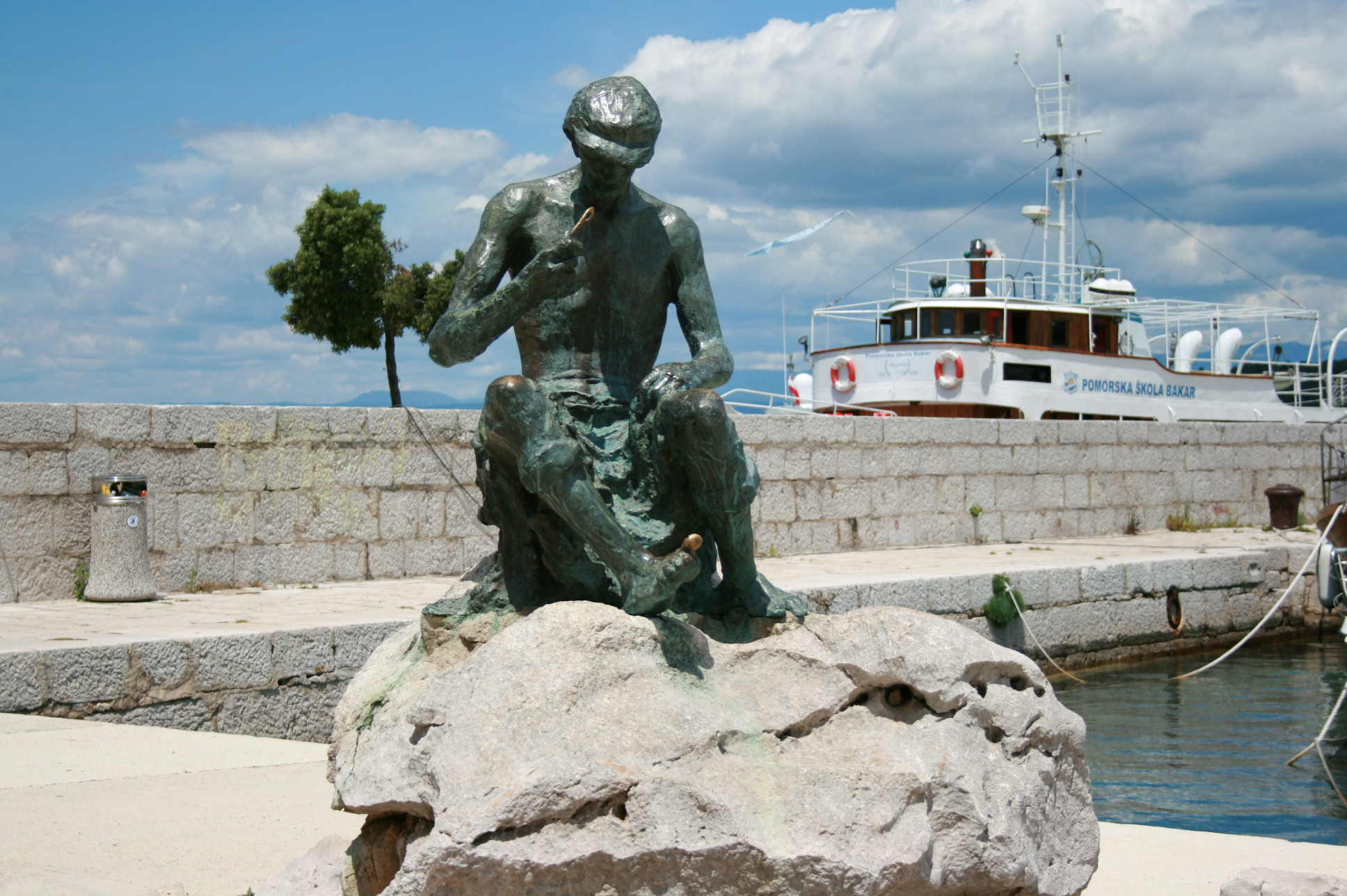
Monument to the fisherman on the quay

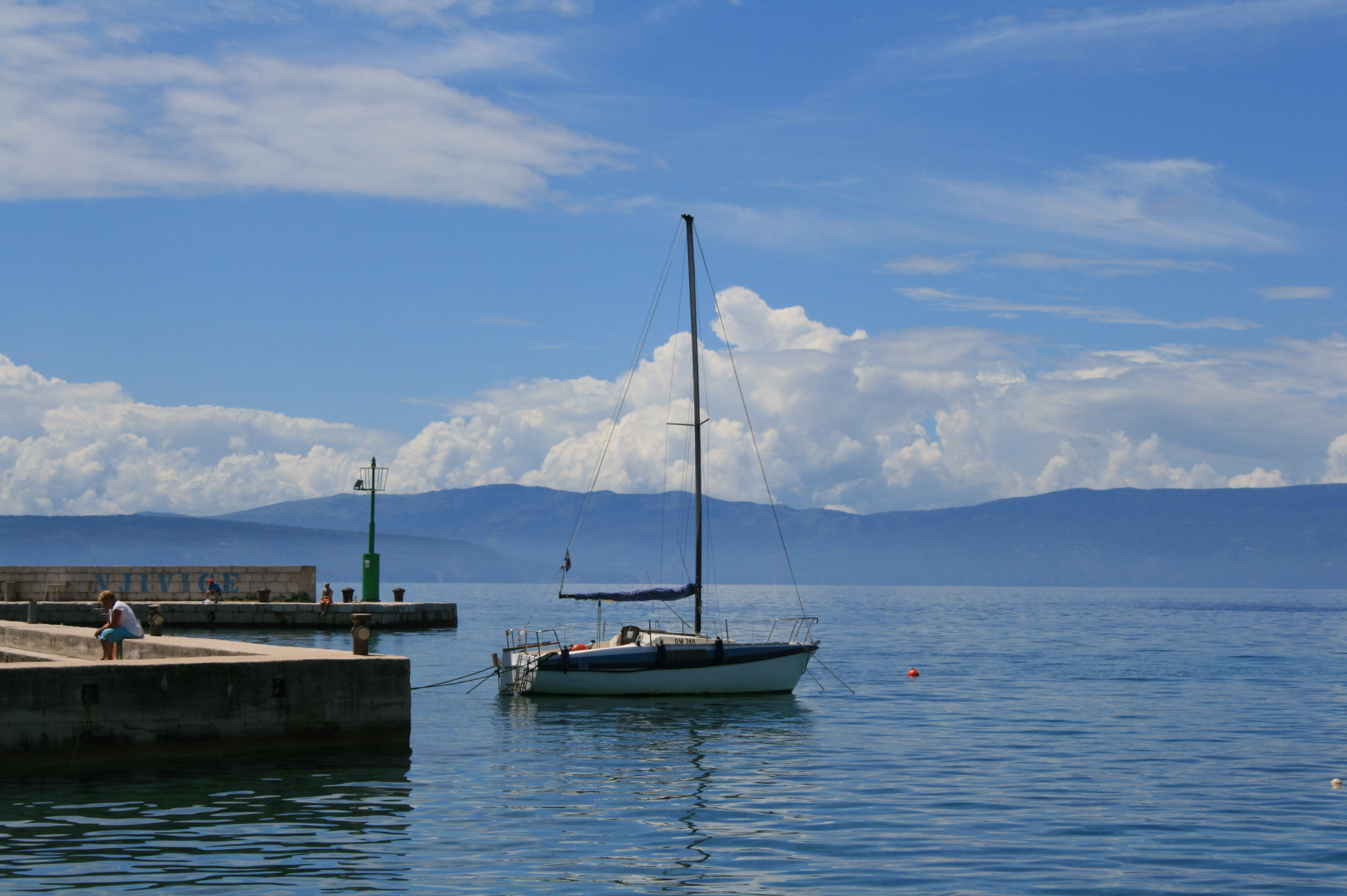
In the port of Njivice

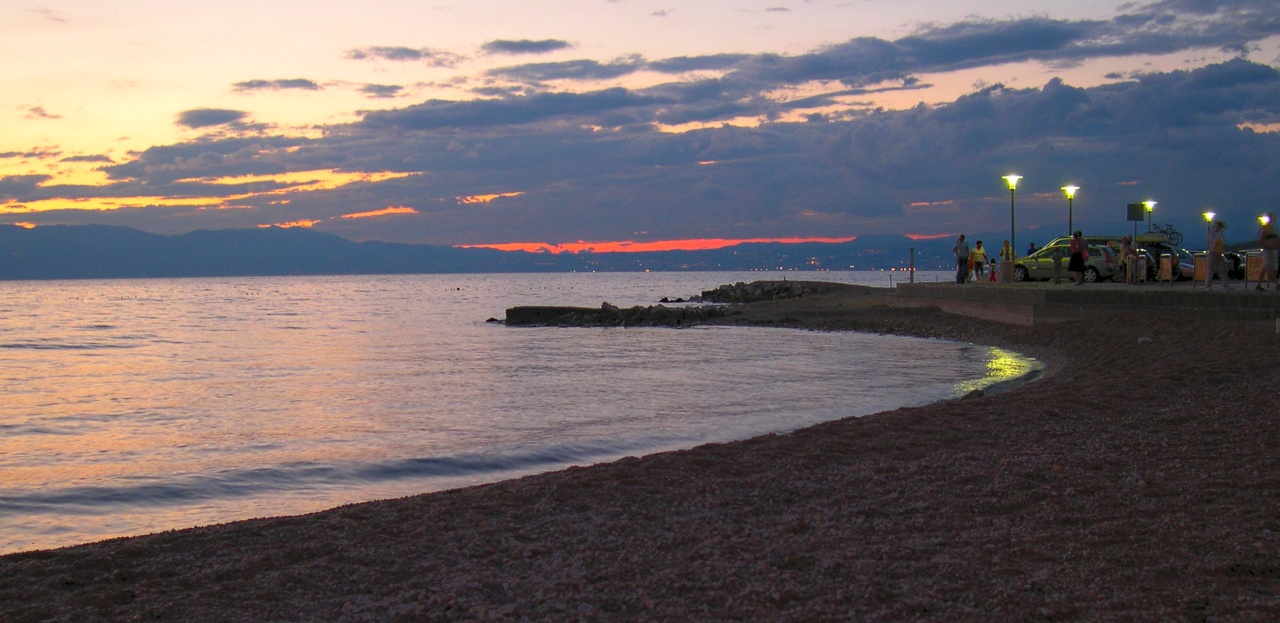
Sunset from Njivice

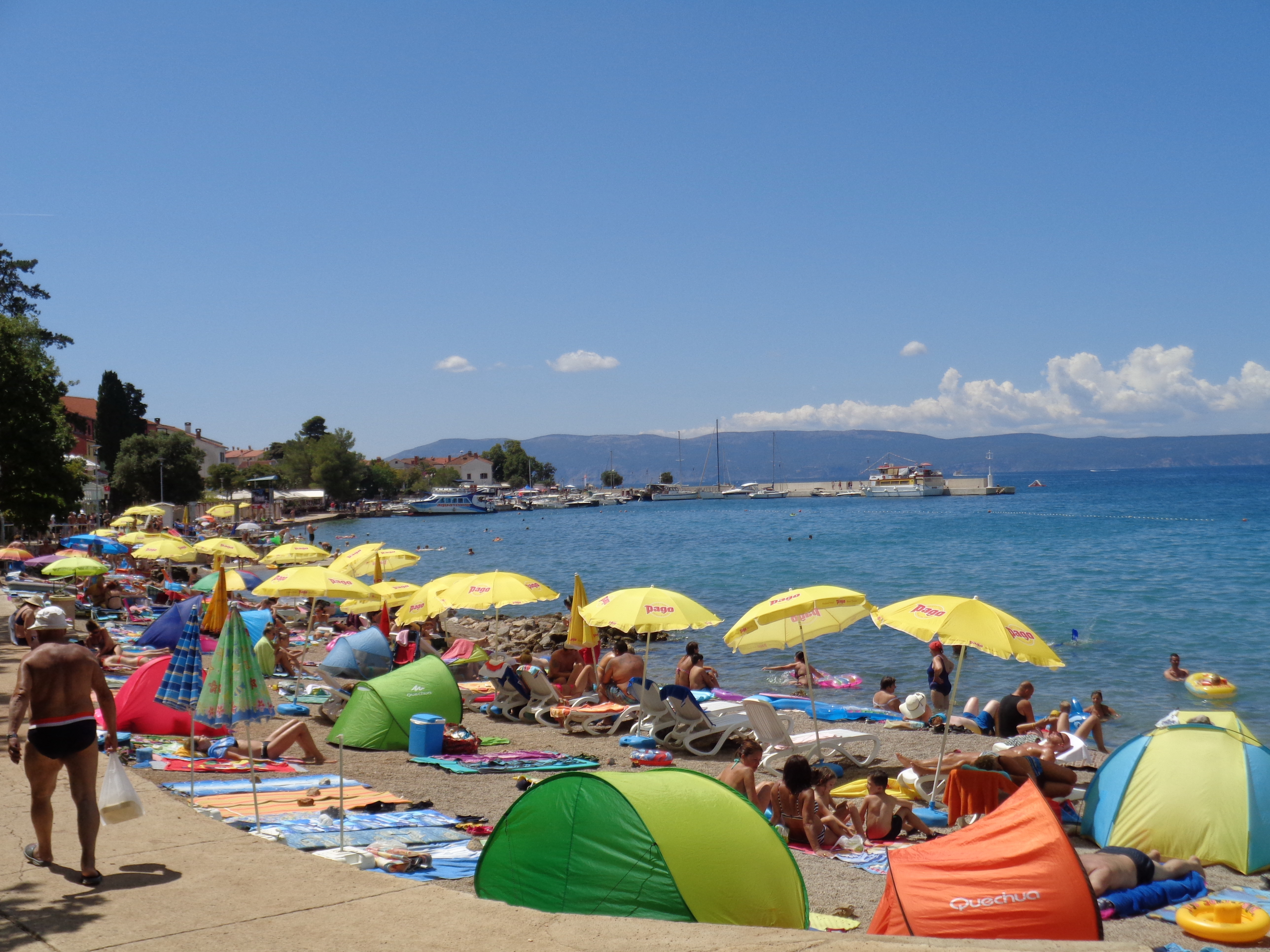
Beach
