= D103 road =

Road in Croatia

D103 state road

Route information
- Length: 1.7 km (1.1 mi)

Major junctions
- From: D102 near Krk bridge
- To: Rijeka Airport

Location
- Country: Croatia
- Counties: Primorje-Gorski Kotar

Highway system
- Highways in Croatia

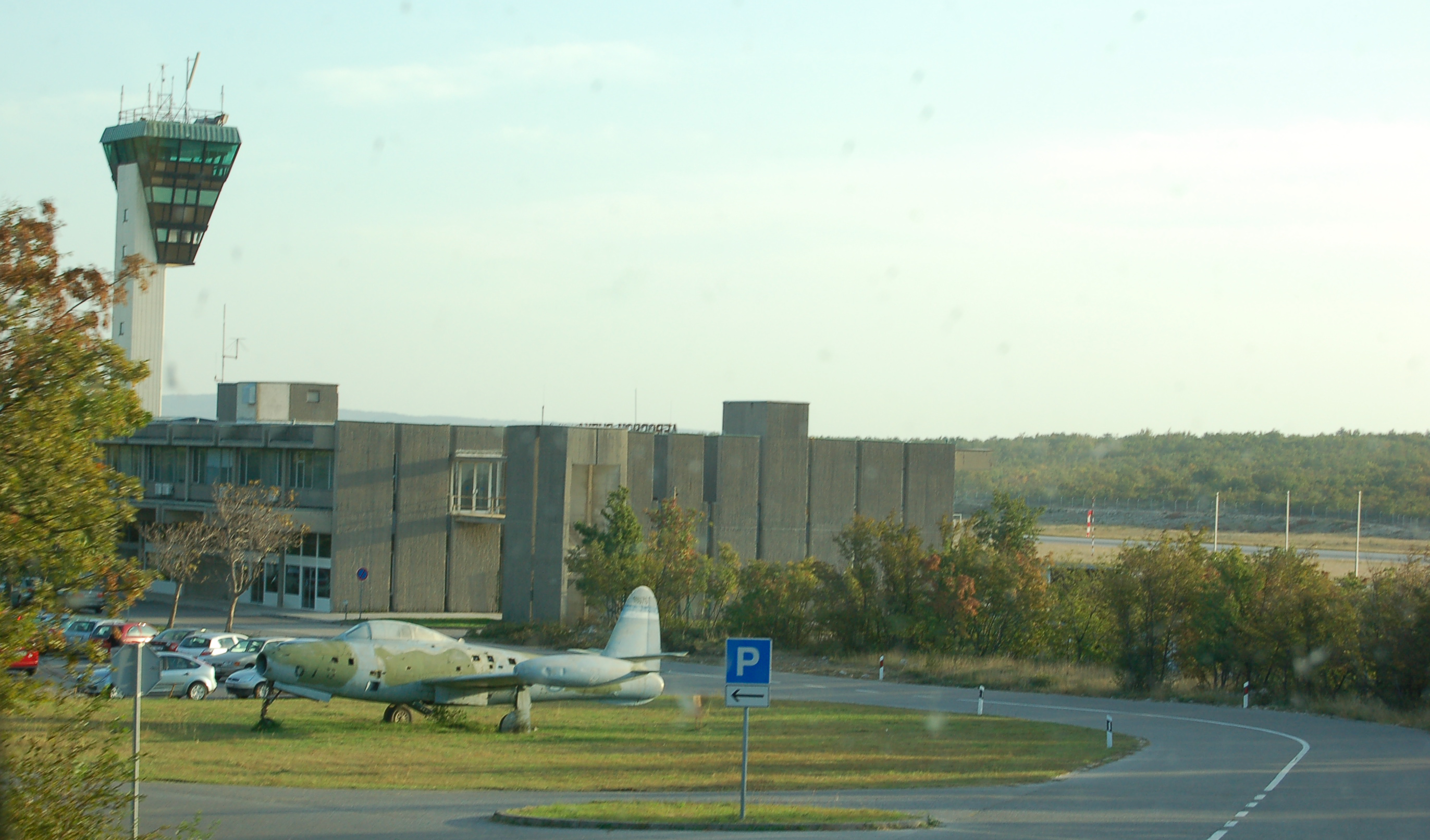
Rijeka Airport

D103 is a state road branching off from D102 state road connecting it to Rijeka Airport, located on the island of Krk. The road is 1.7 km long.

The road, as well as all other state roads in Croatia, is managed and maintained by Hrvatske ceste, a state-owned company.

== Road junctions ==
D103 junctions
Type	Slip roads/Notes
	D102 to Rijeka via D8 state road and A7 motorway (to the north), and Krk (to the south). The western terminus of the road.
	Rijeka Airport - the eastern terminus of the road.

== See also ==
- Hrvatske ceste
- Rijeka Airport
