= D523 road =

Road in Croatia

D523 state road

Route information
- Length: 2.9 km (1.8 mi)

Major junctions
- From: D501 in Križišće
- To: D8 and D102 near Šmrika

Location
- Country: Croatia
- Counties: Primorje-Gorski Kotar

Highway system
- Highways in Croatia

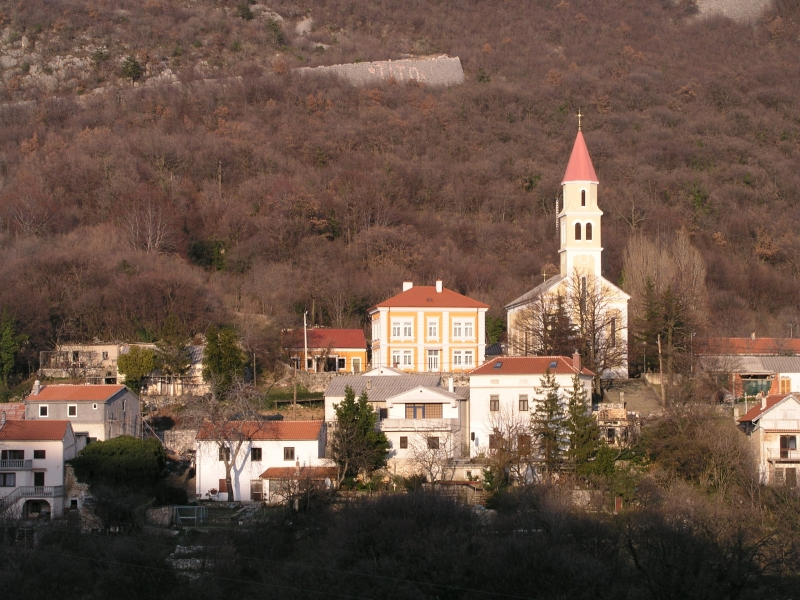
Križišće, at the northern terminus of D523

D523 is a state road connecting D501 state road and D8 / D102 state roads. The road is only 2.9 km long.

This and all other state roads in Croatia are managed and maintained by Hrvatske ceste, state owned company.

== Road junctions and populated areas ==
D523 junctions/populated areas
Type	Slip roads/Notes
	Križišće - junctions in the village: D501 to A6 motorway (Oštrovica interchange) (to the north) and Šmrika and Crikvenica (to the south); Ž5068 to Fužine; Ž5064 to Drivenik Castle, Bribir and further on to Novi Vinodolski.; Northern terminus of the road.
	L58107 to Kraljevica
	D8 to Crikvenica, Novi Vinodolski and Senj to the east, and Rijeka to the west. D102 to Krk; Southern terminus of the road. Southbound D523 traffic defaults to D102.
