= Aviogenex =

Serbian and Yugoslavian charter airline

IATA	ICAO	Call sign
JJ	AGX	GENEX
- Founded: May 1968; 58 years ago (as Genex Air)
- Ceased operations: 2015; 11 years ago
- Fleet size: 1
- Destinations: 19
- Parent company: Genex Group
- Headquarters: Belgrade, Serbia
- Key people: Bojan Nikolić

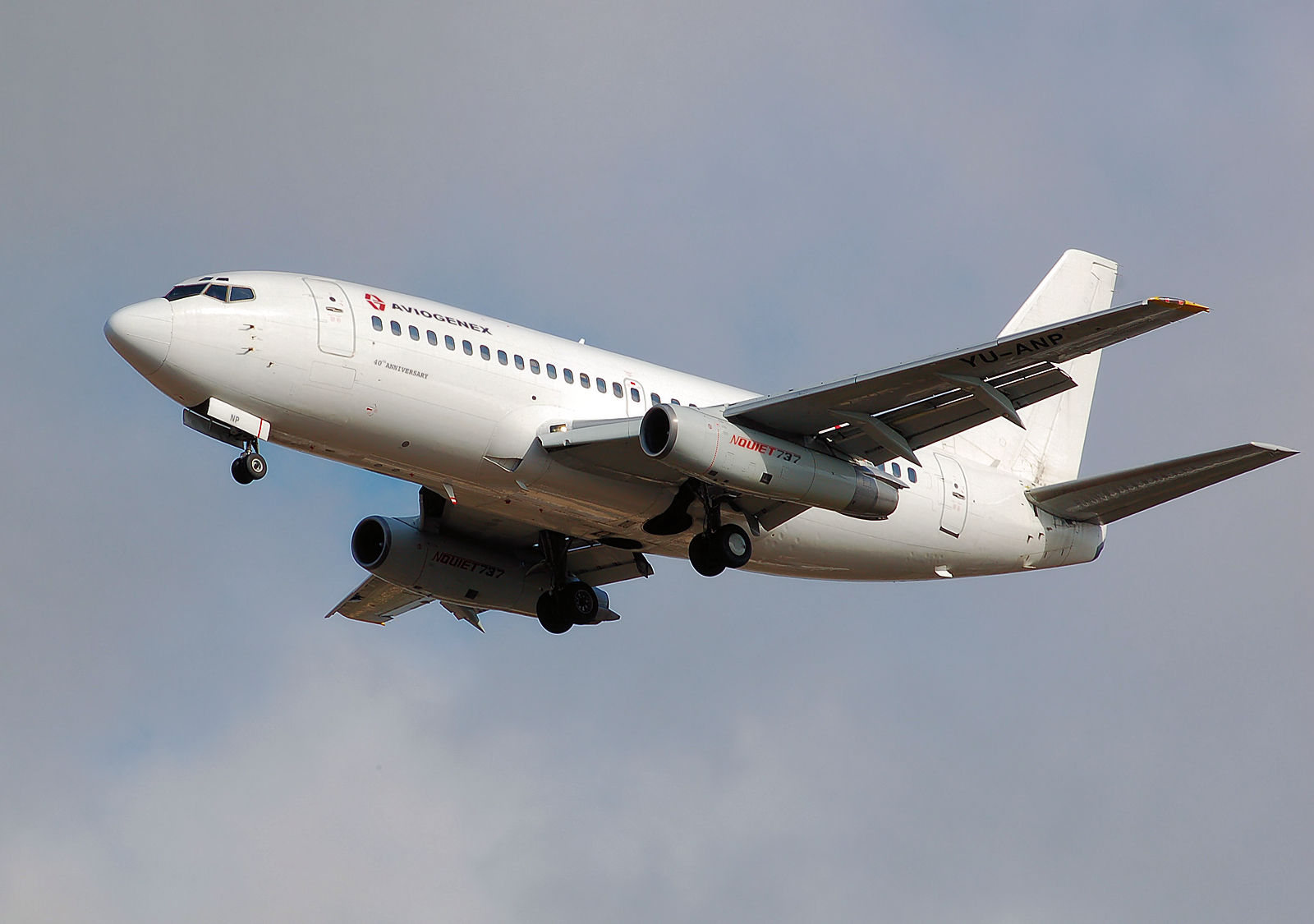
Aviogenex Boeing 737-200Adv (YU-ANP) lands at London Heathrow Airport, England

Aviogenex (Serbian: Авиогенекс / Aviogeneks) was a Serbian and Yugoslav charter airline based at Belgrade Nikola Tesla Airport. It operated regular and ad hoc charter flights as well as wet-lease services.

== History ==
Aviogenex had more than 40 years of experience in flying under charter, sub charter and wet lease agreements. Aviogenex was founded on 21 May 1968 as an air transport division of Generalexport (Serbian: Генералекспорт / Generaleksport), an enterprise for foreign and domestic trade, tourism and air transport. On 30 April 1969, Aviogenex operated its first flight from Belgrade to Düsseldorf Airport using a Tupolev Tu-134. Aviogenex bought their first two Boeing 727-200 from Yugoslav Air Force in 1983.

The last Tu-134's in the fleet were retired in the early 1990s. In 1990, the airline flew 633,932 passengers, with 10 aircraft (5 Boeing 727 and 5 Boeing 737) reaching 17,000 flight hours per year. Since 1991, Aviogenex has oriented to leasing of aircraft and crews, and achieved more than 40,000 flight hours. In this period Aviogenex operated in Europe, Africa, the Middle and Far East, and South America. In 2010, they restarted flights under their own name using a Boeing 737-200 Advanced.

In February 2015, it was announced that Aviogenex had ceased operations and was to be liquidated as the government had failed to attract investors for the airline.

== Services ==
Aviogenex services included:

- International and domestic charter operations
- Aircraft lease with or without crew and technical personnel ("wet" or "dry" lease)
- Transfer of technology/know-how and logistic support
- AGX Engineering Dept maintains Boeing 727-200 and Boeing 737-200 Adv aircraft, to "B"-check level, and operates maintenance facilities (workshops) for its own needs and for the needs of others
- Aviogenex has a Training Center approved by the Ministry for Transportation of the Republic of Serbia for the education and training of its flight and ground staff, cockpit and cabin crew.
- Carriage of cargo and special cargoes
- Ad hoc transport arrangements for special purposes (artistic tours, football matches, VIP flights etc.)

== Destinations ==
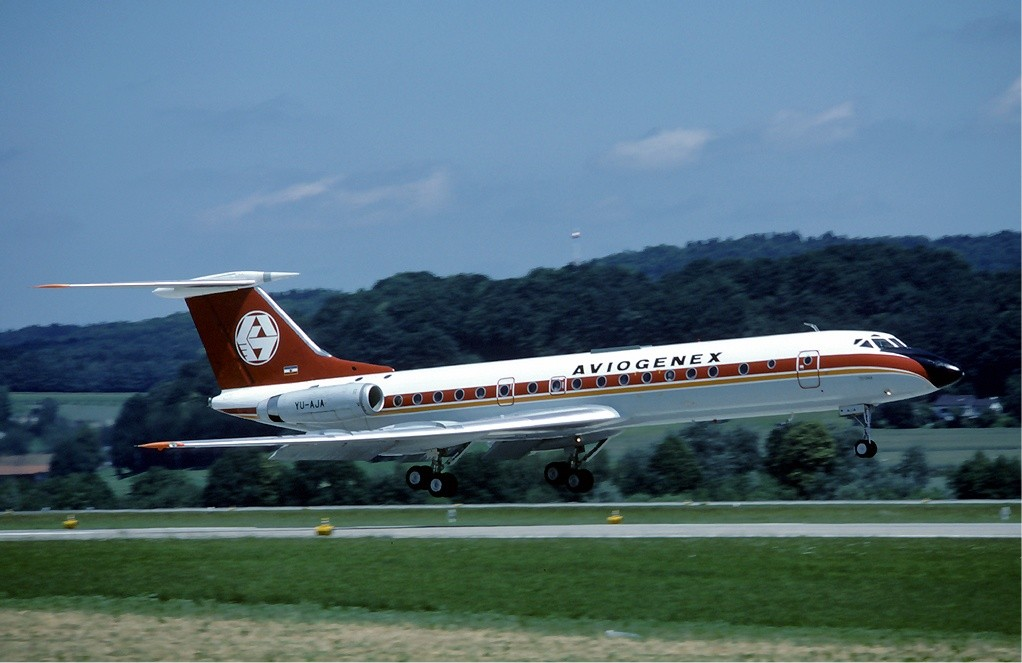
Aviogenex Tu-134 at Zürich Airport in 1982

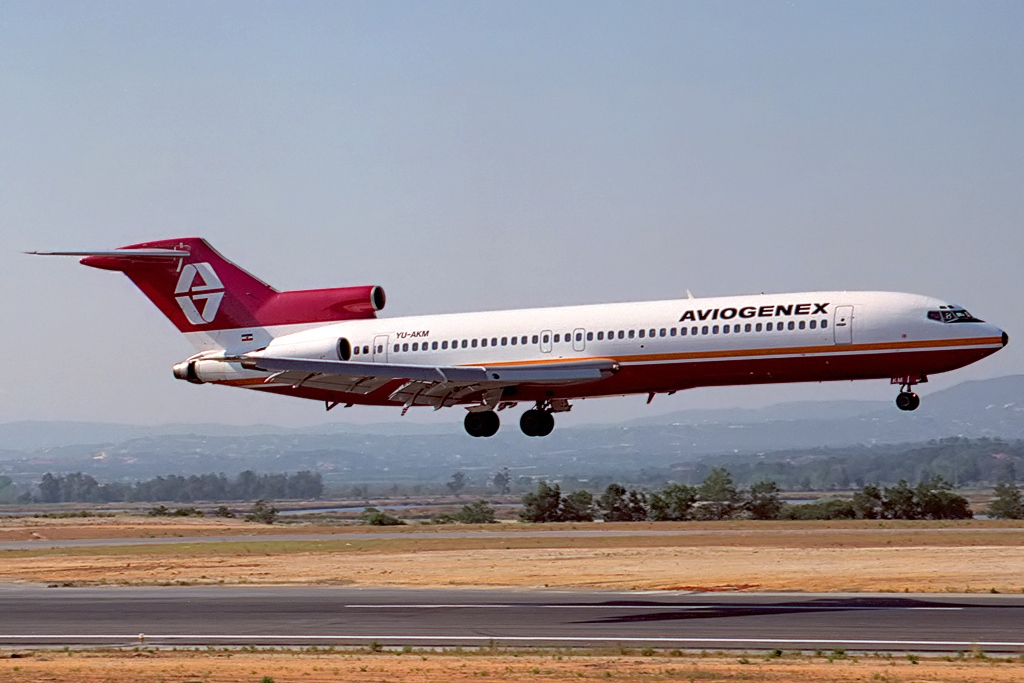
Aviogenex Boeing 727-200 at Faro Airport in the 1980s

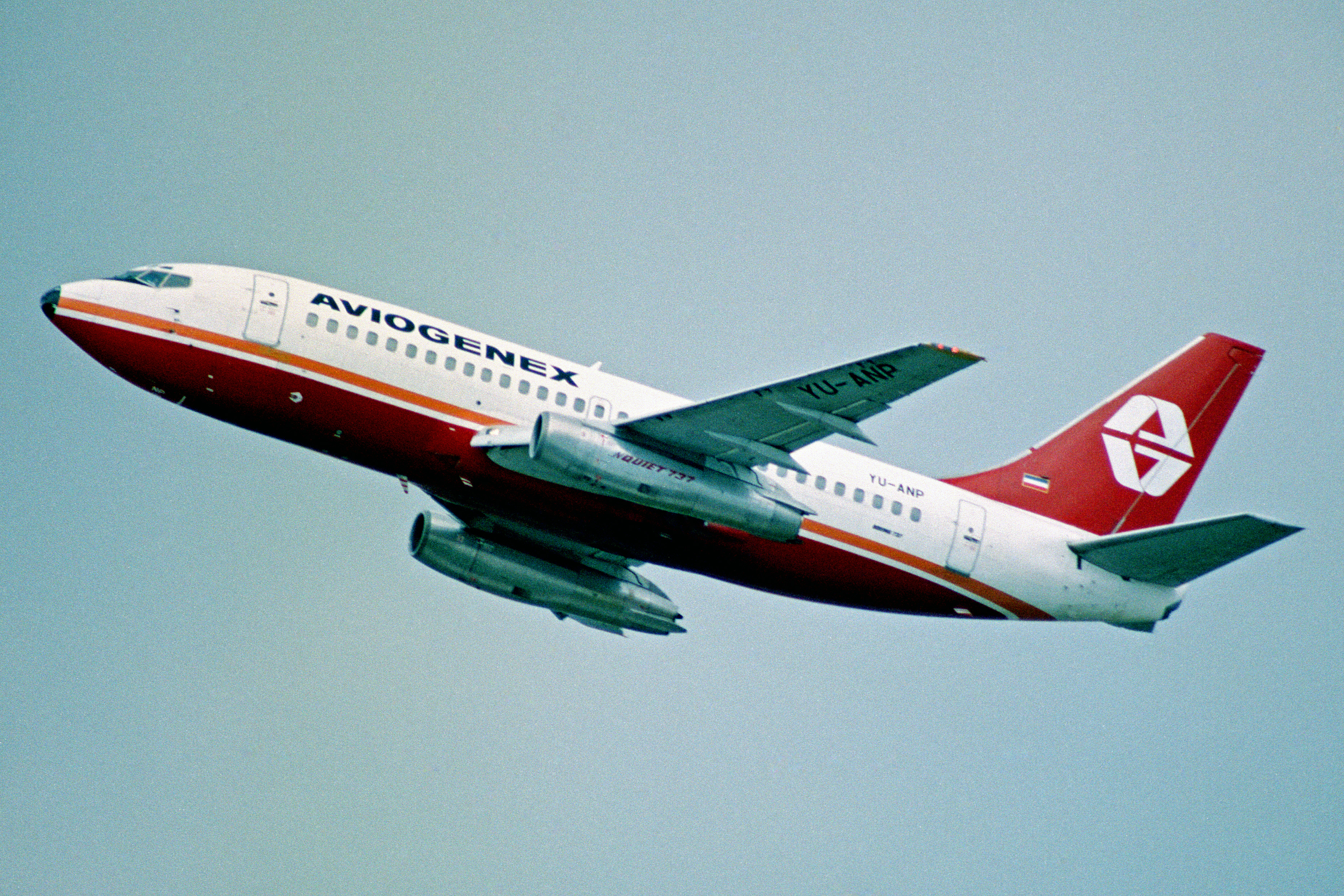
Aviogenex Boeing 737-200 at Zürich Airport in 1999

Aviogenex operated charter services to the following leisure destinations:

Africa
Egypt

- Hurghada – Hurghada International Airport
- Sharm el-Sheikh – Sharm el-Sheikh International Airport

Tunisia

- Djerba – Zarzis International Airport
- Monastir – Monastir – Habib Bourguiba International Airport

Asia
Jordan

- Aqaba – King Hussein International Airport

Europe
Cyprus

- Larnaca – Larnaca International Airport

Greece

- Preveza/Lefkada
- Corfu – Corfu International Airport
- Heraklion – Heraklion International Airport
- Kos – Kos Island International Airport
- Rhodes – Rhodes International Airport
- Santorini
- Skiathos – Skiathos Island National Airport
- Zakynthos – Zakynthos International Airport

Serbia

- Belgrade – Belgrade Nikola Tesla Airport Base

Spain

- Barcelona – Barcelona–El Prat Airport
- Palma de Mallorca – Palma de Mallorca Airport

Turkey

- Antalya – Antalya Airport
- Dalaman – Dalaman Airport

== Fleet ==
As of June 2015, the Aviogenex consisted of one single Boeing 737-200. The historic fleet of Aviogenex included 12 Tupolev Tu-134, 7 Boeing 737-200 and 5 Boeing 727.

== Incidents and accidents ==
- On 23 May 1971, an Aviogenex Tupolev Tu-134A (tail number YU-AHZ) operating flight JJ130 from London Gatwick crashed on approach to its destination of Rijeka Airport located on the island of Krk. The pilots encountered a gust of wind about 70 seconds before touchdown, which sped the plane up more than was allowed, and strong rain encountered at 300 metres above sea level caused the crew to start a steep descent. Because of this, the right side of the plane's landing gear collapsed upon landing. The right wing broke off, and the aircraft turned over, catching fire. Four crew members and one passenger managed to escape. The remaining 75 passengers and all three flight attendants died.
- On 2 April 1977, an Aviogenex Tupolev Tu-134A (registration YU-AJS) was flying flight JJ707 from Belgrade to Libreville, Gabon with stops in Djerba, Tunis and Kano, Nigeria crashed on approach to Libreville Airport located in Gabon. It was a cargo flight and had on board a total of 8 people: three pilots, three mechanics, and two people escorting the spare parts for vehicles and machines for a Yugoslav company in Gabon and uniforms for the Angolan military which were being transported. The pilots had to contend with bad weather, a non-functioning glide slope indicator, and the airport being surrounded by trees up to 45 metres tall. The crew had also spent 8 hours flying, two-thirds of which was spent actively flying the aircraft, and were under pressure to land at Libreville due to the Tupolev's small range. About 1.8 km from the runway, the plane hit a tree with its left wing, which led to a fuel leak and a fire on the plane and surrounding forest. The plane bounced, hitting the ground and killing everybody on board. The authorities in Gabon never produced a report, because they could not read the data from the Soviet-made flight recorder, Gabon not having had diplomatic relations with the USSR at the time. Yugoslav investigators issued a report suggesting pilots make themselves familiar with climate conditions in equatorial Africa, not land at airports without all equipment functioning at night and poor weather conditions, and several others.
- On 22 February 1998, while operating for Chanchangi Airlines of Nigeria, an Aviogenex Boeing 737-200 (registration YU-ANU) was destroyed by a fire at Kaduna Airport, Nigeria. The aircraft was used for rejected takeoff training, with four rejected takeoffs in 12 minutes (in the conditions at the time at Kaduna, a single exercise of a rejected takeoff would have required a cooling period of at least ten minutes). A wheel caught fire due to overheating, and the aircraft burned completely. There were no fatalities.
