= Muraj =

- Village
- Location within Krk Location within Croatia
- Coordinates: 45.05112°N 14.60039°E
- Country: Croatia
- County: Primorje-Gorski Kotar
- Town: Krk

Area
  - Total: 8.4 km^{2} (3.2 sq mi)

Population (2021)
  - Total: 69
  - Density: 8.2/km^{2} (21/sq mi)
- Time zone: UTC+1 (CET)
  - Summer (DST): UTC+2 (CEST)

Muraj is a village on the Croatian island of Krk, just to the east of Kornić and to the west of Lakmartin. Administratively, the hamlet belongs to the town of Krk. As of 2021, the hamlet had 69 inhabitants.
