= Lakmartin =

- Village
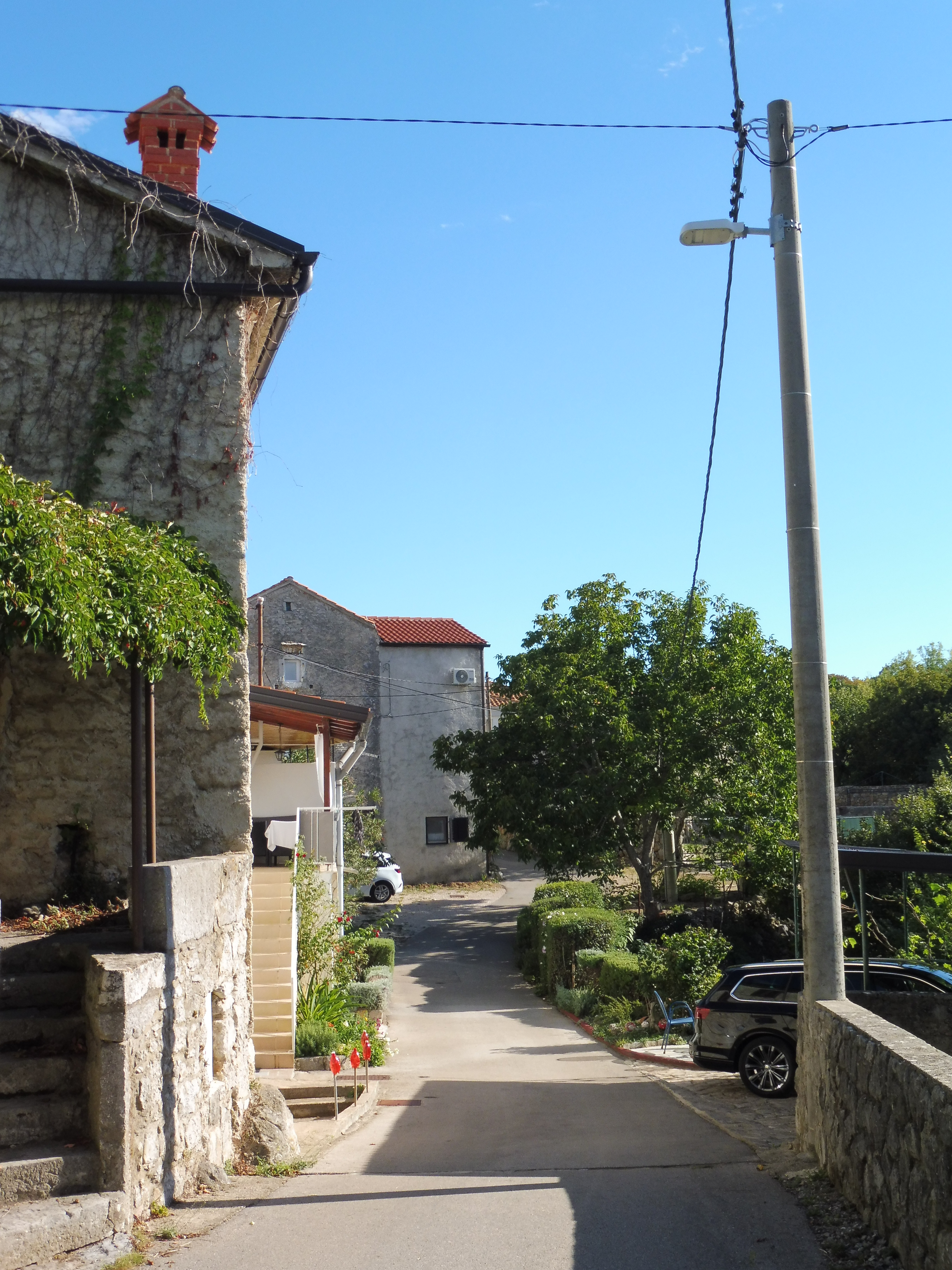
- View of a street in Lakmartin

- Location within Krk Location within Croatia
- Coordinates: 45.05271°N 14.58876°E
- Country: Croatia
- County: Primorje-Gorski Kotar
- Town: Krk

Area
  - Total: 10.1 km^{2} (3.9 sq mi)

Population (2021)
  - Total: 32
  - Density: 3.2/km^{2} (8.2/sq mi)
- Time zone: UTC+1 (CET)
  - Summer (DST): UTC+2 (CEST)

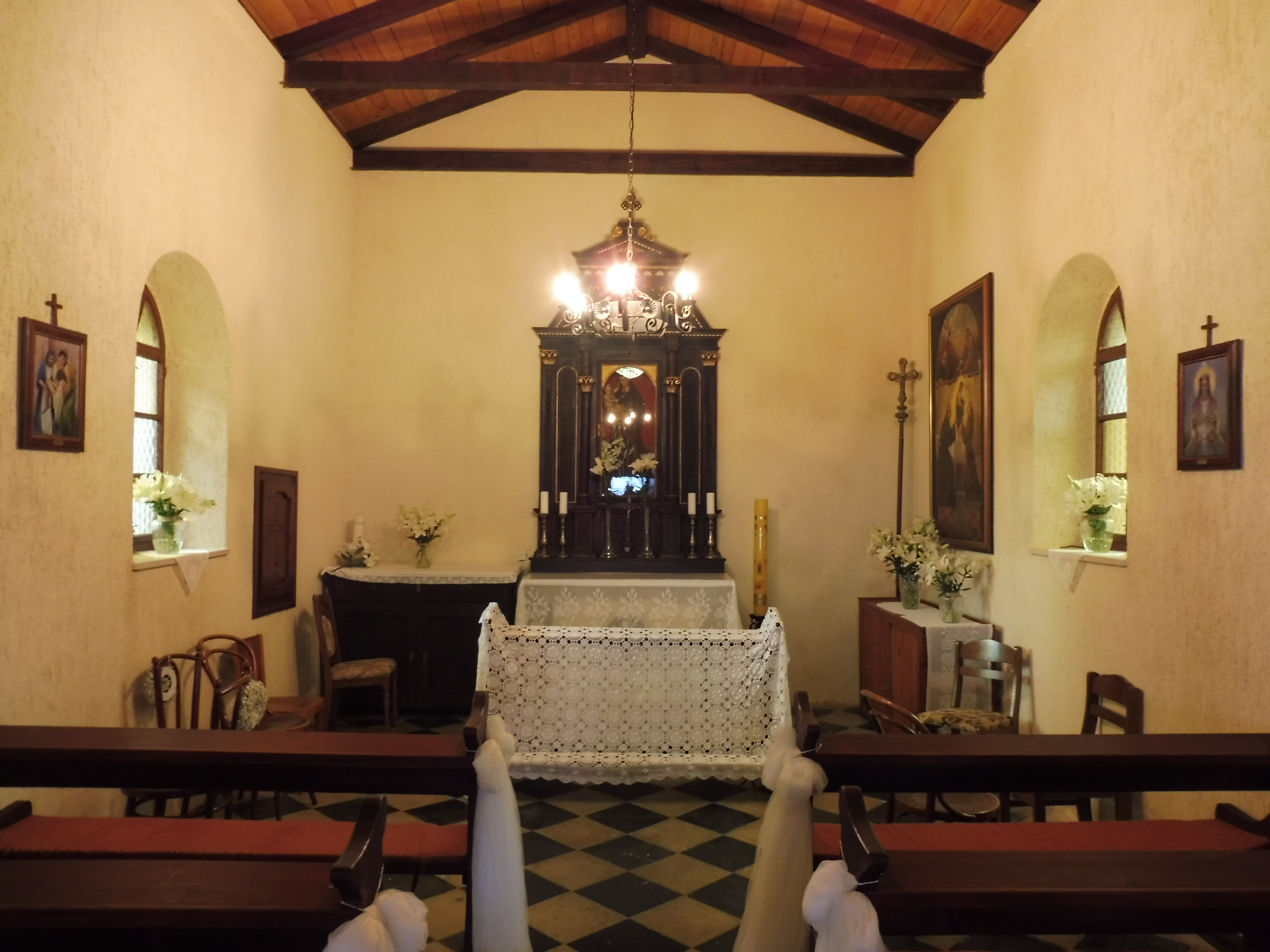
Interior of the chapel

Lakmartin is a village on the Croatian island of Krk, just to the west of Muraj and Kornić. Administratively, it is part of the town of Krk. As of 2021, it had 32 inhabitants. A chapel dedicated to St. Anthony of Padua (Croatian: Crkva sv. Antun Padovanski) is located in Lakmartin.
