= Draga Bašćanska =

Coordinates: 44°59′N 14°43′E

- Village
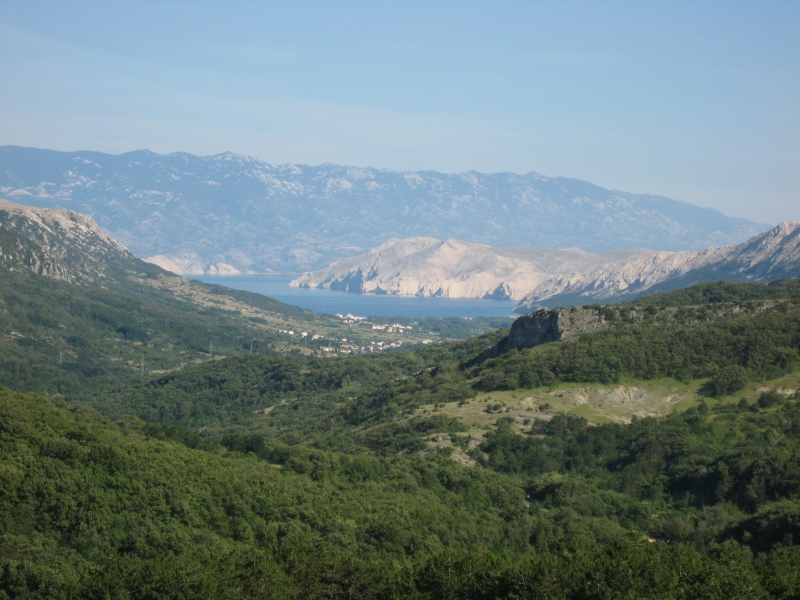
- View of Draga Bašćanska Landscape
- Interactive map of Draga Bašćanska
- Country: Croatia
- County: Primorsko-Goranska

Government
  - Type: Settlement

Area
  - Total: 36.9 km^{2} (14.2 sq mi)

Population (2021)
  - Total: 300
  - Density: 8.1/km^{2} (21/sq mi)
- Time zone: UTC+1 (CET)
  - Summer (DST): UTC+2 (CEST)

Draga Bašćanska (pronounced [drâɡa bâʃtɕanskaː]) is a village in Croatia on the island of Krk (Otok Krk, isola di Velia). It is connected by the D102 highway. The village celebrates the Fiesta of St. Ročo (San Rocco) on August 16th. Typical local products include honey and goat cheese.

== Religion ==
Its Catholic parish was founded in 1827, and its parish church was built in 1778. In 1939, its parish had 1171 souls, plus 138 outside the country.

List of parish priests of Draga Bašćanska:

- Viktor Pičuljan (b. Banjol 1908-05-05, primiz Rab 1932-01-01)

== Governance ==
=== Local ===
It is the seat of its own local committee.

== Bibliography ==
- Draganović, Krunoslav (1939-04-20). Opći šematizam Katoličke crkve u Jugoslaviji. Sarajevo: Akademija "Regina Apostolorum".
