= Aviogenex Flight 130 =

1971 aviation accident

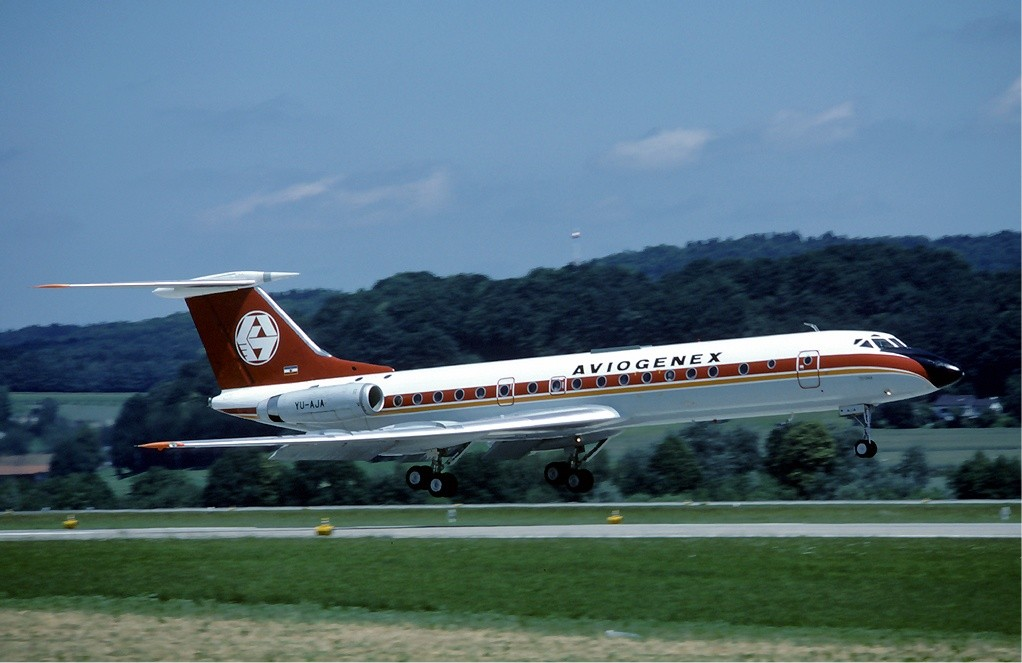
- Aviogenex Tu-134A, YU-AJA, similar to YU-AHZ

Accident
- Date: 23 May 1971
- Summary: Hard landing caused by optical illusion
- Site: Rijeka Airport; 45°13′28″N 14°33′46″E

Aircraft
- Aircraft type: Tupolev Tu-134A
- Aircraft name: Skopje
- Operator: Aviogenex
- IATA flight No.: JJ130
- Registration: YU-AHZ
- Flight origin: Gatwick Airport, London, United Kingdom
- Destination: Rijeka Airport, Rijeka, Yugoslavia
- Passengers: 76
- Crew: 7
- Fatalities: 78
- Injuries: 5
- Survivors: 5

Aviogenex Flight 130 was an international charter passenger flight from Gatwick Airport, London to Rijeka Airport, Yugoslavia (modern-day Croatia). On 23 May 1971, the Tupolev Tu-134A servicing the flight suffered structural failure during landing. The aircraft flipped over and caught fire, killing 78 out of 83 people. There were 5 survivors. The crash became the first fatal accident of the Tupolev Tu-134 since the aircraft entered service.

British authorities assisted in the investigation led by the Yugoslavian Directorate General of Civil Aeronautics. The investigation found that the crew might have suffered an optical illusion due to heavy showers and the dusk that could have led the crew to believe that the runway was closer and lower than it actually was. In response to the illusion, the crew executed an overly steep and fast descent in the last phase of the final approach, causing a hard touchdown and breakage of the right wing.

== Aircraft ==
The Tupolev Tu-134 is a twin-engined, narrow-body jet airliner built in the Soviet Union from 1966 to 1989. In 1968, Tupolev began work on an improved 72-seat Tu-134 variant. The fuselage received a 2.1 m (6.9 ft) plug for greater passenger capacity and an auxiliary power unit in the tail. As a result, the maximum range was reduced from 3,100 km (1,900 mi) to 2,770 km (1,720 mi). The upgraded D-30 engines now featured thrust reversers, replacing the parachute. The first Tu-134A flew on 22 April 1969 and the first airline flight was on 9 November 1970. The aircraft servicing Aviogenex Flight 130 bore serial number 1351205 and was registered as YU-AHZ. It had accumulated a total of only 111 airframe hours at the time of the crash. The plane was imported into Yugoslavia on 23 April 1971, and an airworthiness certificate was issued on 27 April.

== Passengers and crew ==
There were 76 passengers and seven crew members aboard Flight 130. The flight was transporting British tourists travelling on holiday to Rijeka, the third-largest city in SR Croatia. Seventy-two passengers were British tourists, while the other 11 passengers and crew (7 crew and 4 passengers) were from Yugoslavia. One of the passengers aboard was Josip Pupačić, a popular Croatian poet at the time, who was flying back from London with his wife and daughter, following the latter's surgery.

The captain and pilot flying was 41-year-old Miloš Markićević. He held an IFR rating and had 9,230 flight hours, 138 of which were on the Tupolev Tu-134A. The copilot and pilot monitoring was 34-year-old Stevan Mandić, who had 2,300 flight hours, with 899 hours in type. A trainee, Viktor Tomić, had 99 flight hours. He was supervised by 39-year-old flight engineer Ivan Čavajda, who had accumulated 7,500 flight hours, of which 1,373 were on the Tu-134.

== Crash ==
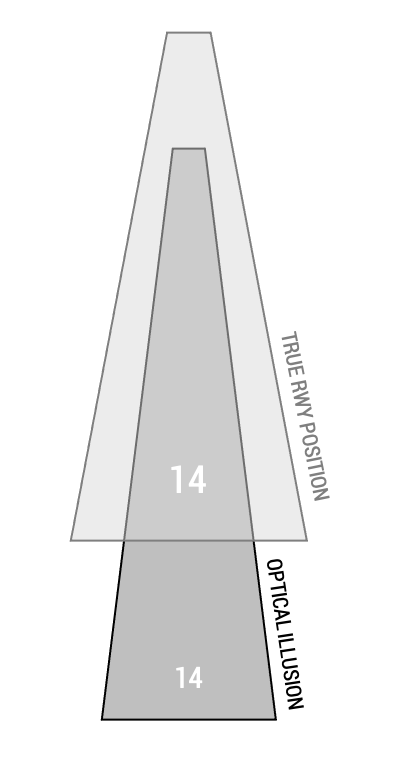
RWY Optical Illusion - Cockpit View.

The aircraft took off from Gatwick at 16:33 GMT, flight code JJ 130. The flight was uneventful despite poor weather conditions over Europe until the final approach to Rijeka Airport. After establishing communication with Rijeka ATC, the controller on duty passed meteorological info to the crew and warned them about cumulonimbus clouds above the Učka mountain range. Using their airborne radar, the crew managed to fly around the cumulonimbus, but were too high to catch the instrument landing system (ILS) glide slope. The aircraft flew over the airport, returned to Breza non-directional beacon (BZ NDB) and caught the ILS glide path and localizer normally. The crew followed the ILS glide path with a slightly increased speed. At 4 km (2.5 mi) from the RWY14 threshold (THR 14), at an altitude of 300 m (980 ft) above the sea level, the aircraft entered torrential rain under cumulonimbus clouds The clouds, with their base at 600 m (2,000 ft), were above the northwest part of the airport and extending towards Rijeka for several kilometres from THR 14.

Approximately 3.2 km (2.0 mi) from the THR 14, 50 seconds before impact, the aircraft was carried upwards and rolled to the right by the slight turbulence caused by the cumulonimbus. The crew managed to align the aircraft with the runway centerline but could not return to the ILS glide path. The aircraft remained above the glide path despite the crew's effort to reduce altitude by applying down elevator and reducing power. Because of a likely optical illusion caused by dusk, rain and water on runway, the crew believed that they were closer and higher from the runway than they actually were. Above the middle marker, 1.2 km (0.75 mi) from THR 14 and 18 seconds before impact, engine power increased and up elevator was applied, meaning that the pilot initiated a go-around procedure. Then after just three seconds, 300 m (980 ft) from THR 14 and at an altitude of 60 m (200 ft) above the runway threshold elevation, power was reduced to idle and down elevator was applied as the pilot changed his mind and decided to continue landing. As a result of the aerodynamic features of the aircraft and reduced speed, the aircraft entered a gradually steepening angle of descent. It touched down hard on RWY 14 at around 19:45, some 180 m (590 ft) before the proper approach touchdown point, right landing gear first, at 140 knots (260 km/h (160 mph)). As a result of excessive forces (vertical load of 4g/horizontal load 1.5g) on the right landing gear, its strut and shock absorber broke forward the right wing broke off, causing the aircraft to flip over and slide down the runway inverted for 700 m (2,300 ft). A fire was started by the sparks from the flaps scratching the runway and the fuel that was spilled from the broken right wing. The last words of the pilot before the impact were reported to be: "What is pushing me now, what is that?!"

All passengers and crew survived the initial impact. In the first minute after the main wreckage came to a rest, fire broke under left wing, in the tail, behind the right engine and under remaining parts of the right wing. Thick smoke immediately filled the cabin. Panicked passengers attempted to evacuate from the burning wreckage, but the thick smoke and darkness (the electrical supply had shut off immediately after impact) made it extremely difficult. The four flight-crew members safely evacuated through the right window of the cockpit.

One group of passengers went to the rear of the cabin, while another went to the front of the cabin searching for an exit. The Tupolev-134 aircraft has only two doors, which are located in the front part of the fuselage. The doors on the left side are passenger doors and those on the right side are service doors. Both passenger and service doors were blocked because of a fuselage distortion caused by the impact. The passenger doors may have been locked from inside by the panicked flight attendant by pushing the lever in the wrong direction because the aircraft was in an upside-down position. The aircraft's four emergency exit windows could not be used: two on the left side because of the fire on the left wing, and two on the right side because they were blocked by the bent remains of the right wing.

The first firefighting unit arrived two minutes after the wreckage came to a rest. They immediately extinguished the fire on the left wing and then the fire in the tail and in the remaining parts of the right wing. Rescuers tried but were unable to open the doors, cut the fuselage with a chainsaw or break the cabin windows with axes. It seemed that the fire around the aircraft had been extinguished, but it became evident that the fire inside the cabin was worsening. Thick smoke emerged from the tail and the holes in the windows made by the attempts to break them by axe. This worsened the situation, as air was allowed to enter the cabin, intensifying the fire. Flight engineer Ivan Čavajda (though some sources claim that was Viktor Tomić) returned to the cockpit to help the passengers and cabin crew evacuate, but was unable to open the cockpit door. The cabin crew and passengers managed to pry open the service doors, but by that time the smoke was too thick, and most of the passengers and cabin crew (three flight attendants) had succumbed to carbon monoxide poisoning. Eight minutes after the wreckage had come to a rest, fire in the left and right wing started again. Attempts to extinguish the flames were hindered by the rain and strong southern wind, which blew away the fire-smothering foam. In the next two minutes, the whole cabin was engulfed by an intense fire. At that moment, firefighters and other rescuers withdrew to a safe distance fearing possible explosions. Two minutes later, fire reached the oxygen equipment in the front of the wreckage, causing an explosion and the disintegration of the front section of the fuselage. In the following few minutes, the remaining portion of the fuselage was completely destroyed by the fire.

The lone surviving passenger, 22-year-old Ranko Sarajčić, evacuated through an opening in the rear part of the plane. He said that he had told others to follow him, but in the panicked cabin, none did.

According to investigators, 30% of the passengers were found fastened in their seats upside-down.

== Investigation and conclusions ==
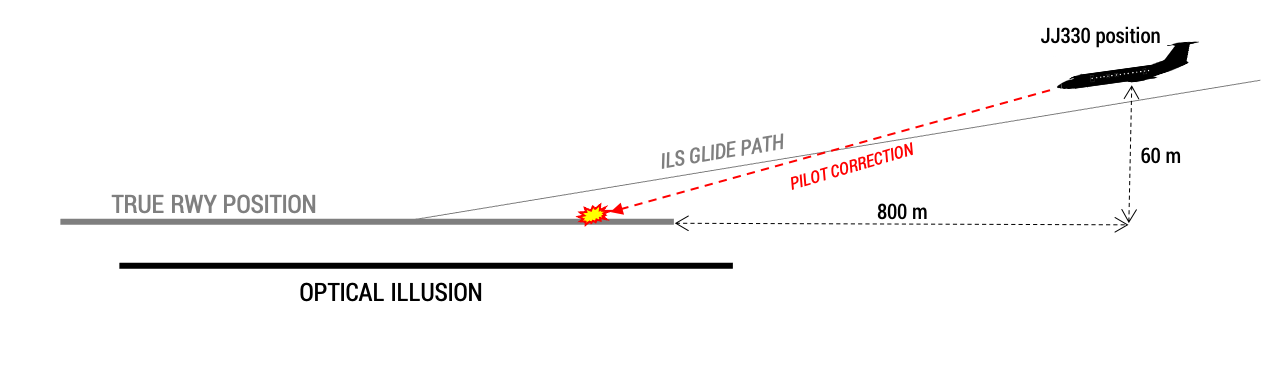
RWY optical illusion, side view.

The accident was investigated by the Yugoslavian Directorate General of Civil Aeronautics and was supported by the British Air Accidents Investigation Branch. The official report, released on 1 December 1973, found that as Flight 130 flew through the rain in dusk conditions, refraction of light on the cockpit windshield caused an optical illusion that made the runway seem closer and lower (by 60 m (200 ft)) than it actually was. The illusion caused the crew to make a sharp correction applying nose-down input and reducing power to idle in the final phase of landing. The sharp nose-down input caused the aircraft to reach a speed of 310 km/h (190 mph) and to contact the runway at speed of 260 km/h (160 mph) with excessive forces (vertical load of 4g and horizontal load 1.5g) on the right landing gear that broke the right wing.

The commission issued six recommendations, including the need for pilots to study possible illusions that could be encountered during landing in heavy rain. The only conclusion stated in the commission's official report is: "According to the opinion of the Commission this was an exceptional and complex case of many unfavourable circumstances which resulted in this catastrophy [sic]." There was no mention of pilot error. Pilot-in-command Miloš Markićević was found not responsible for the crash and he eventually returned to flying, but in business aviation.

The investigators could not determine why the crew had failed to execute a go-around procedure during their obviously unstabilised approach.
