= Kornić =

Coordinates: 45°03′N 14°36′E

Kornić Miće Sopele
- Village
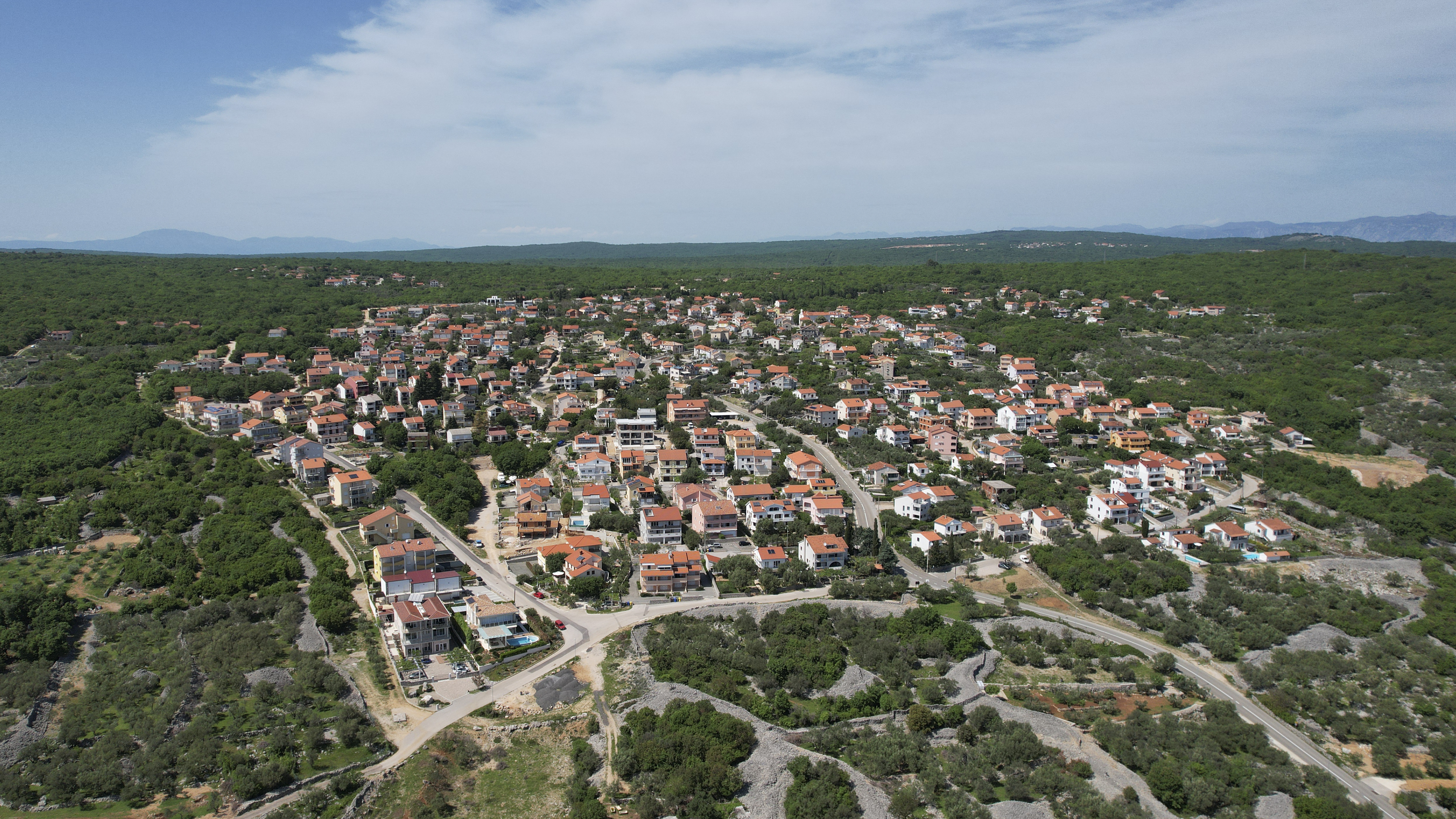
- View of Kornić
- Interactive map of Kornić
- Country: Croatia
- County: Primorje-Gorski Kotar County

Area
  - Total: 7.0 km^{2} (2.7 sq mi)

Population (2021)
  - Total: 500
  - Density: 71/km^{2} (180/sq mi)
- Time zone: UTC+1 (CET)
  - Summer (DST): UTC+2 (CEST)

Kornić is a village on the island of Krk, Croatia.

== Governance ==
=== Local ===
It is the seat of the Local Committee of Kornić, encompassing itself, Lakmartin and Muraj.

== Religion ==
Its Catholic parish was founded in 1840, and its parish church was built in 1866. In 1939, its parish had 589 souls, plus 93 outside the country.

List of parish priests of Kornić:

- Andrija Mavrinac (b. Cernik 1882-06-28, primiz Sušak 1906-05-20)

== Bibliography ==
- Draganović, Krunoslav (1939-04-20). Opći šematizam Katoličke crkve u Jugoslaviji. Sarajevo: Akademija "Regina Apostolorum".
