= Jadranovo =

- Location of Jadranovo within Croatia
- Coordinates: 45.228°N 14.616°E
- Country: Croatia
- County: Primorje-Gorski Kotar County

Area
  - Total: 7.6 km^{2} (2.9 sq mi)
- Elevation: 0 m (0 ft)

Population (2021)
  - Total: 1,077
  - Density: 140/km^{2} (370/sq mi)
- Time zone: UTC+1 (CET)
  - Summer (DST): UTC+2 (CEST)
- Postal code: 51264
- Area code: 051

Jadranovo is a small coastal town in the northern coast of Croatia. Tourism here has flourished due to its proximity to Crikvenica.

== Geography ==
Jadranovo is at approximately 45°10′N 14°41′E. This is 8 km from Crikvenica and 26 km from Rijeka. Jadranovo is on the sunny northern Adriatic coast and is divided into two parts by a small peninsula. This peninsula contains the Bay of Lokvišće.

== History ==
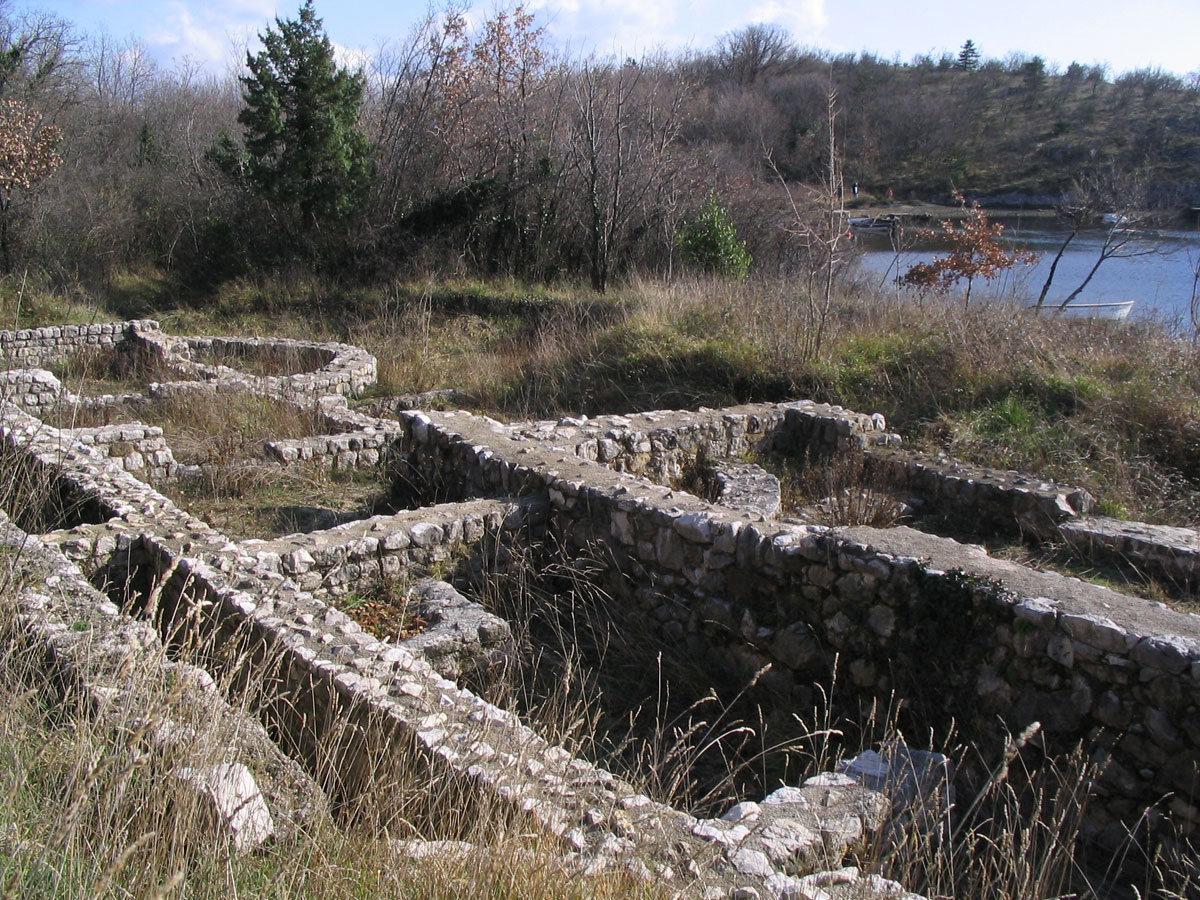
Archeological Ruins Lokvišće

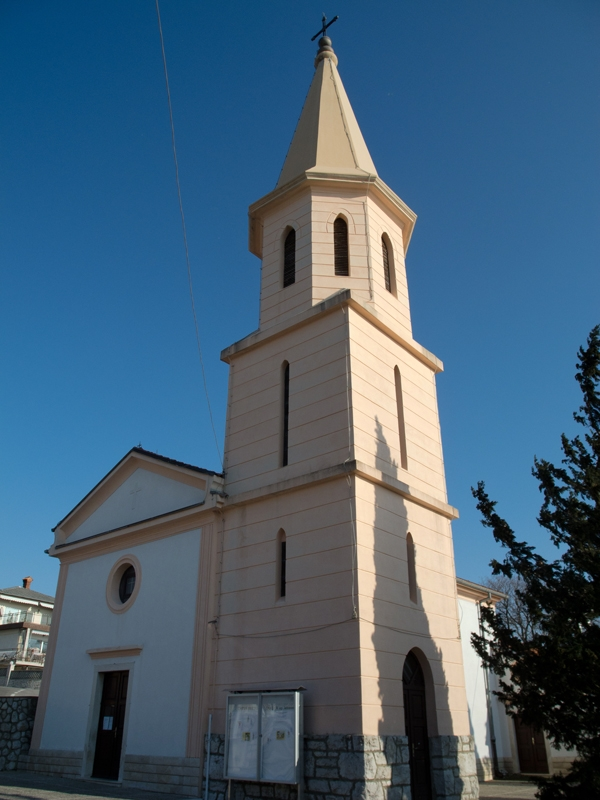
Church of St. James

The favorable climate of Jadranovo attracted early settlers, with earliest traces of settlements in the area dating back to 6500 BC - 4000 BC.

The archeological site at the Bay of Lokvišće includes ruins of walls that were in use from Antiquity until the 17th century. A large number of broken amphorae dating from the 3rd century BC to the 1st century BC were also found in the area. This indicates that Lokvišće was likely a small port with warehouses for the production and storage of wine and olive oil.

In the 8th and 9th Century this area was populated by Croats, from the northern region of Dalmatia. The site of today's Jadranovo was named St. James (Sveti Jakov) on a map of Iacoppa de Giroldisa in the year 1426. In the Middle Ages, Jadranovo was a coastal estate and port of the castle of Drivenik municipality.

On June 14, 1952, the name Sv. Jakov – Šiljevica was abolished. In a referendum in 1954 the new name Jadranovo was chosen (other proposed names were: Ribarevo, Lovorovo, Zidarevo, Radenovo). The inhabitants were continued to be referred to as Jakovari even after the name change to Jadranovo.

The last two days of November 2008, the maximum wave height as recorded at nearby Bakar reached a record. Little rain fell, but the city was flooded anyway thanks to a strong sirocco wind. Firefighters had to pump water from basements and the HEP had to repair broken power lines. Some of the Jadranovo's beaches lost all their sand during the storm.

== Governance ==
=== Local ===
It is the seat of its own local committee.

== Economy ==
Tourism is the largest part of the economy in Jadranovo. Although Jadranovo does not have a large capacity hotel, thanks to private accommodation arranged in rooms and apartments, Jadranovo can accommodate up to three thousand guests. During the summer there are fun events like the traditional fishermen's festival. Saint James's Feast is also celebrated on July 25 with live music.

== Population ==
Jadranovo has 1,224 inhabitants (2011 census).
