= Šmrika =

Coordinates: 45°15′00″N 14°36′07″E

- Village
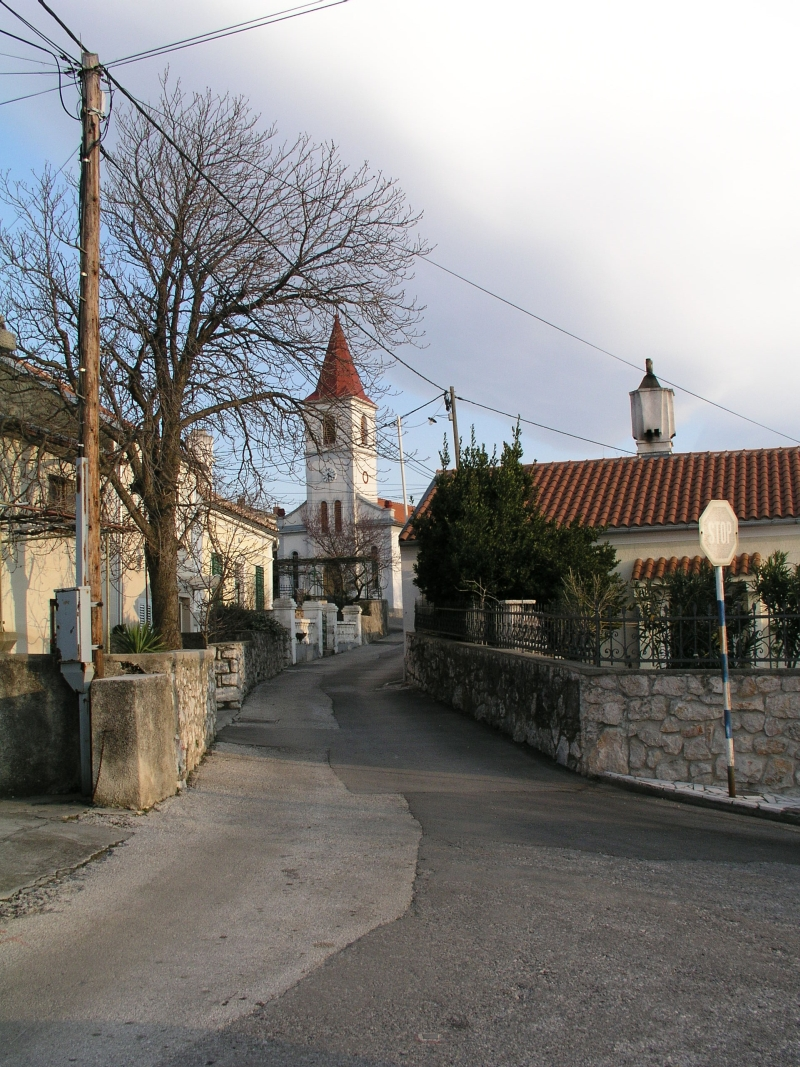
- Street of Smrika, Croatia
- Interactive map of Šmrika
- Country: Croatia
- County: Primorje-Gorski Kotar County

Area
  - Total: 2.2 sq mi (5.8 km^{2})

Population (2021)
  - Total: 963
  - Density: 430/sq mi (170/km^{2})
- Time zone: UTC+1 (CET)
  - Summer (DST): UTC+2 (CEST)

Šmrika is a village in Croatia, near the Island Krk and the Krk Bridge. It is part of the town of Kraljevica, which is part of the Primorje-Gorski Kotar County, at an elevation of 200 meters above sea level.

== Governance ==
=== Local ===
It is the seat of its own local committee.
