= Krk Bridge =

Krk Bridge Krčki most
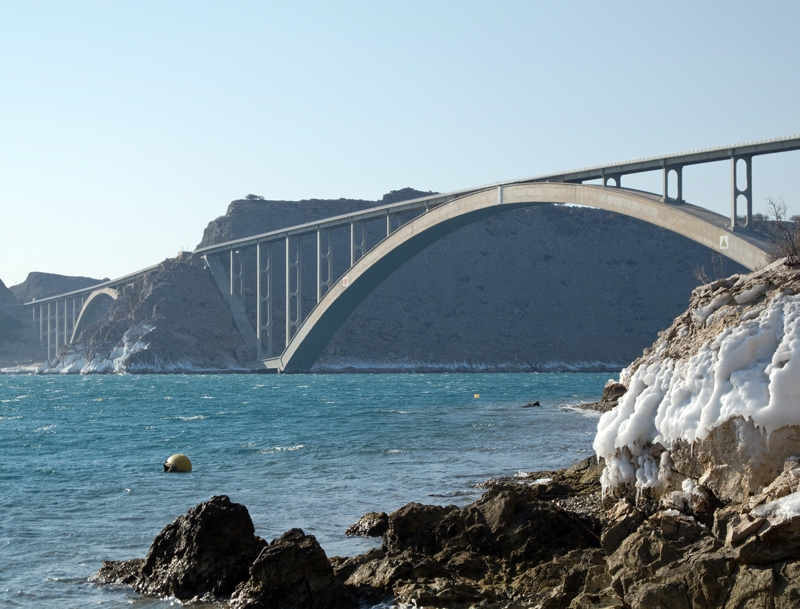
- Krk bridge
- Coordinates: 45°14′40″N 14°34′00″E
- Carries: Road vehicles
- Crosses: Krk Channel, Adriatic Sea
- Locale: Primorje-Gorski Kotar County, Croatia
- Other name: Tito's Bridge
- Maintained by: Hrvatske autoceste

Characteristics
- Design: concrete arch bridge
- Total length: 1,430 m (4,692 ft)
- Width: 11.40 m (37 ft)
- Longest span: 390 m (1,280 ft) (416 m (1,365 ft) underwater)
- Clearance below: 67.02 m (220 ft), smaller bow 54.56 m (179 ft)

History
- Constructed by: Mostogradnja; Hidroelektra
- Construction start: 1976
- Construction end: 1980
- Construction cost: $50 million USD
- Opened: 19 July 1980

Statistics
- Toll: None (since 15 June 2020)

Location
- Interactive map of Krk Bridge

Krk Bridge (Croatian: Krčki most) is a 1,430 m (4,692 ft) long reinforced concrete arch bridge connecting the Croatian island of Krk to the mainland. Carrying over a million vehicles per year, it was the last tolled bridge in Croatia that was not part of a motorway until the removal of tolls in 2020. The longer of the bridge's two arches is the third-longest concrete arch in the world and the longest outside of China, and among the longest arches of any construction. The bridge was completed and opened in July 1980 and originally named Tito's Bridge (Croatian: Titov most) in honor of Yugoslav president Josip Broz Tito, who had died two months earlier. The bridge has since been renamed Krk Bridge or Krčki most. The bridge was tolled since its opening until the removal of tolls on 15 June 2020. However, passage had been toll free for Krk residents since 1999 and vehicles owned by Krk businesses since the 2000s. When the tolls were removed, passenger cars were being charged 35 kuna, southbound only.

Prior to 1 January 2021, maintenance was undertaken by Autocesta Rijeka - Zagreb d.d. Due to the acquirement of ARZ by Hrvatske autoceste d.o.o. on that date, the bridge is now maintained by HAC.

== Construction ==
The bridge was designed by Ilija Stojadinović in cooperation with Vukan Njagulj and Bojan Možina, and built by Mostogradnja Belgrade and Hidroelektra Zagreb between 1976 and 1980. It was designed as a cantilever bridge with temporary cable-stays. Structurally, the bridge consists of two reinforced concrete arch spans, which rest on the islet of Sveti Marko between Krk and the mainland. The length of the longer arch is 390 m (1,280 ft) (actually 416 m (1,365 ft), a part of the bow is in the water), which made it the longest concrete arch at the time of construction, the distinction it held until it was surpassed by Wanxian Bridge (425 m (1,394 ft) length of arch) in 1997.

== Traffic ==
Krk Bridge connects the island's 19,916 inhabitants (as of 2021) and its tourist resorts to Jadranska magistrala, the main road along the Adriatic coast. It also connects the city of Rijeka to Rijeka Airport, which is situated on Krk. In the first 20 years of its existence, the bridge was crossed by 27 million vehicles, more than double of ferry traffic to and from the island. Krk Bridge only carries one lane of traffic in each direction, and the increasing levels of traffic warrant a larger replacement bridge which is currently in planning stages.

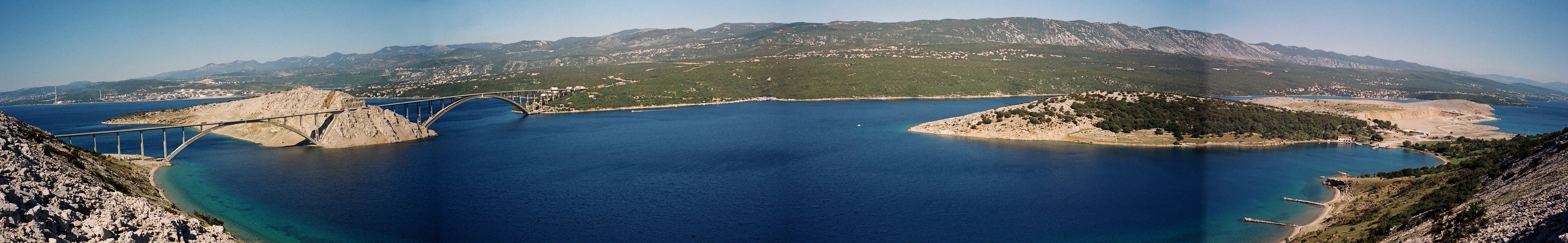
Krk Bridge and its surroundings

== Replacement ==
Although the strong winds of the bora often close the bridge to certain groups of vehicles during the year, sometimes to all traffic, recent research indicates that the wind is not the greatest threat to the bridge, but rather salt.

Because of this, but also because of the expansion of the port terminals on Krk, and because of the increasing traffic on the bridge, in recent years, the construction of a new bridge and the closure of the existing one have been considered. The new bridge would not be built on the site of the current one, but a kilometer south in the area where the island of Krk, or more precisely its Lanterna peninsula, is closest to the mainland - only about 600 meters away. The new Krk Bridge would have 4 traffic lanes, which would carry the highway to behind Malinska, and a railway line that would lead to the future container terminal near Omišalj.

== See also ==
- List of arch bridges by length
- List of bridges by length

== Sources ==
- Simović, Veselin (2000). "Dvadeseta obljetnica mosta kopno – otok Krk" [Twentieth anniversary of the Krk – mainland bridge] (PDF). Građevinar (in Croatian). 52 (8): 431–442.
