= Rijeka Airport =

International airport serving Rijeka, Croatia

Rijeka Airport Zračna luka Rijeka/Krk I.
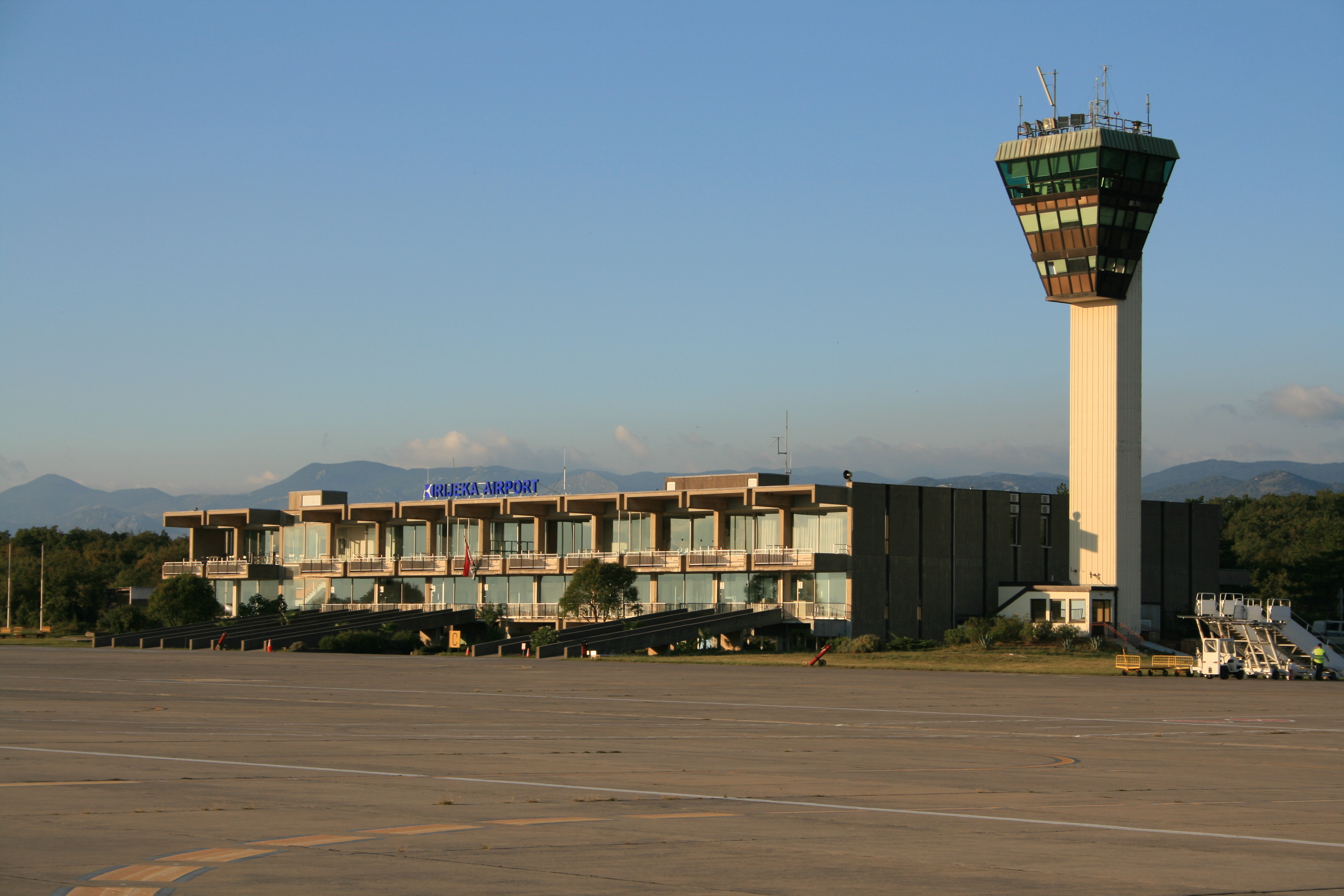
- IATA: RJK; ICAO: LDRI

Summary
- Airport type: Public
- Operator: Rijeka Airport Ltd.
- Serves: Rijeka
- Location: Omišalj, Croatia
- Elevation AMSL: 278 ft (85 m)
- Coordinates: 45°13′01″N 014°34′13″E
- Website: rijeka-airport.hr

Map
- Location of the airport in Croatia RJK (Krk)

Runways
Direction	Length		Surface
Direction	m	ft	Surface
14/32	2,500	8,202	Concrete/asphalt

Statistics (2025)
- Passengers: 160,249 ▲10.4%
- Source: Croatian Aeronautical Information Publication

Rijeka Airport (Croatian: Zračna luka Rijeka, Italian: Aeroporto di Fiume; IATA: RJK, ICAO: LDRI) is the international airport serving Rijeka, Croatia. It is located near the town of Omišalj on the island of Krk, 17 km from the Rijeka railway station. Most of the traffic to and from the airport occurs during the summer months, when it is used by several European low-cost airlines flying tourists to the northern parts of the Croatian coast.

It's the 6th busiest airport in Croatia, with over 160,000 passengers in 2025.

== History ==
Rijeka Airport opened in May 1970. The first plane to depart carried Josip Broz Tito and his wife.

Before the Second World War, Rijeka was divided between Yugoslavia and Italy. The Yugoslav part of the city was served by the airfield in Sušak. Domestic airline Aeroput opened a route linking Sušak to Zagreb in 1930, and a year later, a route linking Zagreb to Belgrade via Sušak, Split and Sarajevo was opened. By 1936, Aeroput linked the city to Belgrade, Borovo, Ljubljana, Sarajevo, Split and Zagreb. The Italian part of the city was connected to many Italian cities with regular flights provided by Italian company Ala Littoria.

The Grobnik airport had difficulty with larger planes, as its runways were close to the hills to the east of the city. With larger airliners coming on board, planners decided on a location on Krk after considering locations close to Opatija and near Urinj, which would have required moving some hills.

== Facilities ==
=== Terminal ===
Rijeka airport has a single terminal building which dates back to its original opening in 1970. Over the decades minor upgrades have been made. The terminal has seven gates: one domestic and six international. None of the gates have jet bridges and boarding is by walking from the terminal to the aircraft. The arrivals hall features a single baggage belt. On the upper floor there is a small duty free shop in the international area, mostly featuring local products, as well as a café bar. Another bar with a limited selection of snacks is located in the entrance hall. Domestic departures have no facilities after the security checkpoint. Several car rental agencies maintain offices during the summer season.

=== Runway ===
The airport has a single runway, approximately 2500 m long and 45 m wide. There are no taxiways. Consequently, aircraft have to turn at the end of the runway and taxi back along the runway to approach the terminal. Runway 14 has CAT I ILS landing aids installed.

== Ground transportation ==
Since the airport is located on the island of Krk, there is a dedicated bus line from Rijeka and Omišalj which runs as needed, considering the flight arrival times. The shuttle would not operate unless bookings are made 24 hours prior to departure.

== Airlines and destinations ==
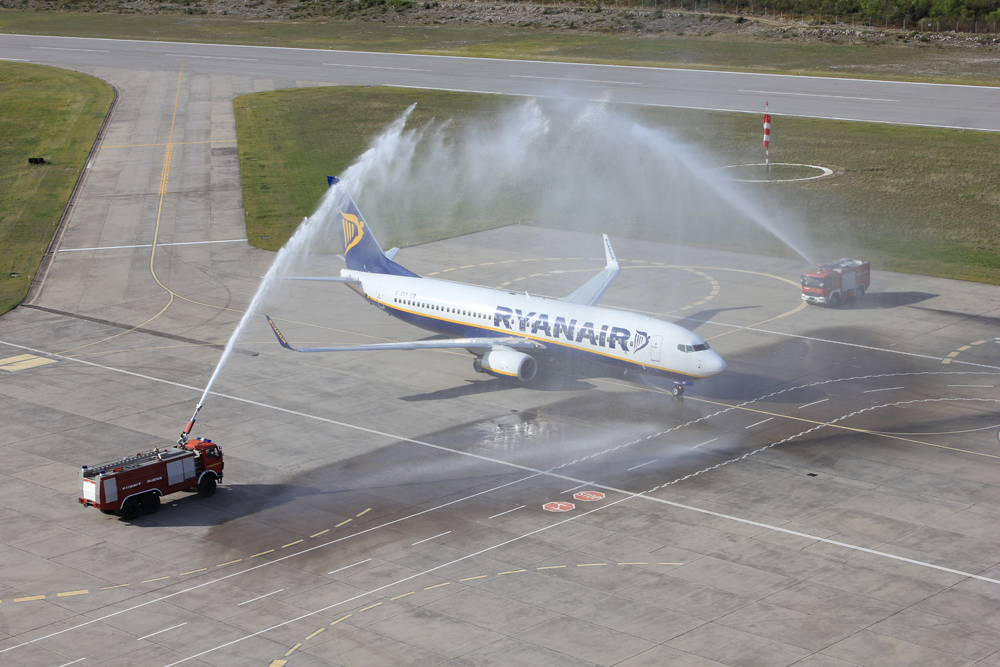
Water cannon salute for Ryanair's first landing at Rijeka airport.

The following airlines operate regular scheduled and charter flights at Rijeka Airport:

Airlines	Destinations
Air Serbia	Seasonal: Belgrade
Croatia Airlines	Seasonal: Munich
Eurowings	Seasonal: Cologne/Bonn, Düsseldorf, Hamburg, Stuttgart
Lufthansa	Seasonal: Frankfurt, Munich
Ryanair	Seasonal: Hahn, London–Stansted, Stockholm–Arlanda, Wrocław
Swiss International Air Lines	Seasonal: Zürich
Trade Air	Dubrovnik, Osijek, Split, Zadar
Wizz Air	Seasonal: Gdańsk, Katowice, Lublin

== Statistics ==
Traffic figures at Rijeka Airport
Year	Passengers	Change	Aircraft movements	Change	Cargo	Change
2011	84,713	▲28.32%	2,680	▲32.84%		
2012	77,082	▼7.77%	2,290	▼15.49%		
2013	142,975	▲93.47%	2,653	▲17.13%		
2014	106,235	▼26.82%	2,378	▼10.37%		
2015	139,718	▲37.06%	4,014	▲68.80%		
2016	145,297	▲3.99%	4,146	▲3.29%		
2017	142,111	▼2.2%	4,937	▲19.1%	2,130,742	
2018	183,606	▲29.2%	5,460	▲10.6%	4,655,866	▲118.5%
2019	200,841	▲9.4%	4,942	▼9.4%	1,025.879	▼78.0%
2020	27,680	▼86.22%	3,360	▼32.01%	259,226	▼74,73%
2021	56,388	▲103.71%	4,286	▲27.55%	56	▼99,98%
2022	164,086	▲190.99%	4,392	▲2.47%	41,077	▲73.78%
2023	154,367	▼5.92%				
2024	145,148	▼5.97%	5,114		8,306	
2025	160,249	▲10.4%	5,904	▲15.45%	10,414	▲25.38%

== Incidents and accidents ==
- On 23 May 1971, Aviogenex Flight 130 crashed on approach to Rijeka Airport because of rough landing in bad weather conditions, killing 78 people and leaving five survivors. Among the victims was the Croatian poet Josip Pupačić with his wife and daughter.
