= Šotovento =

- Municipality
- Location of Šotovento in Croatia Šotovento (Croatia)
- Coordinates: 45°05′N 14°29′E
- Country: Croatia
- County: Primorje-Gorski Kotar
- Island: Krk

Population (2001)
  - Total: 62
- Time zone: UTC+1 (CET)
  - Summer (DST): UTC+2 (CEST)
- Postal code: 51500
- Area code: 051
- Vehicle registration: RI

Šotovento is a municipality in Primorje-Gorski Kotar County on the island of Krk in western Croatia. Part of the town of Krk, it is adjacent to Malinska-Dubašnica.

== Geography ==
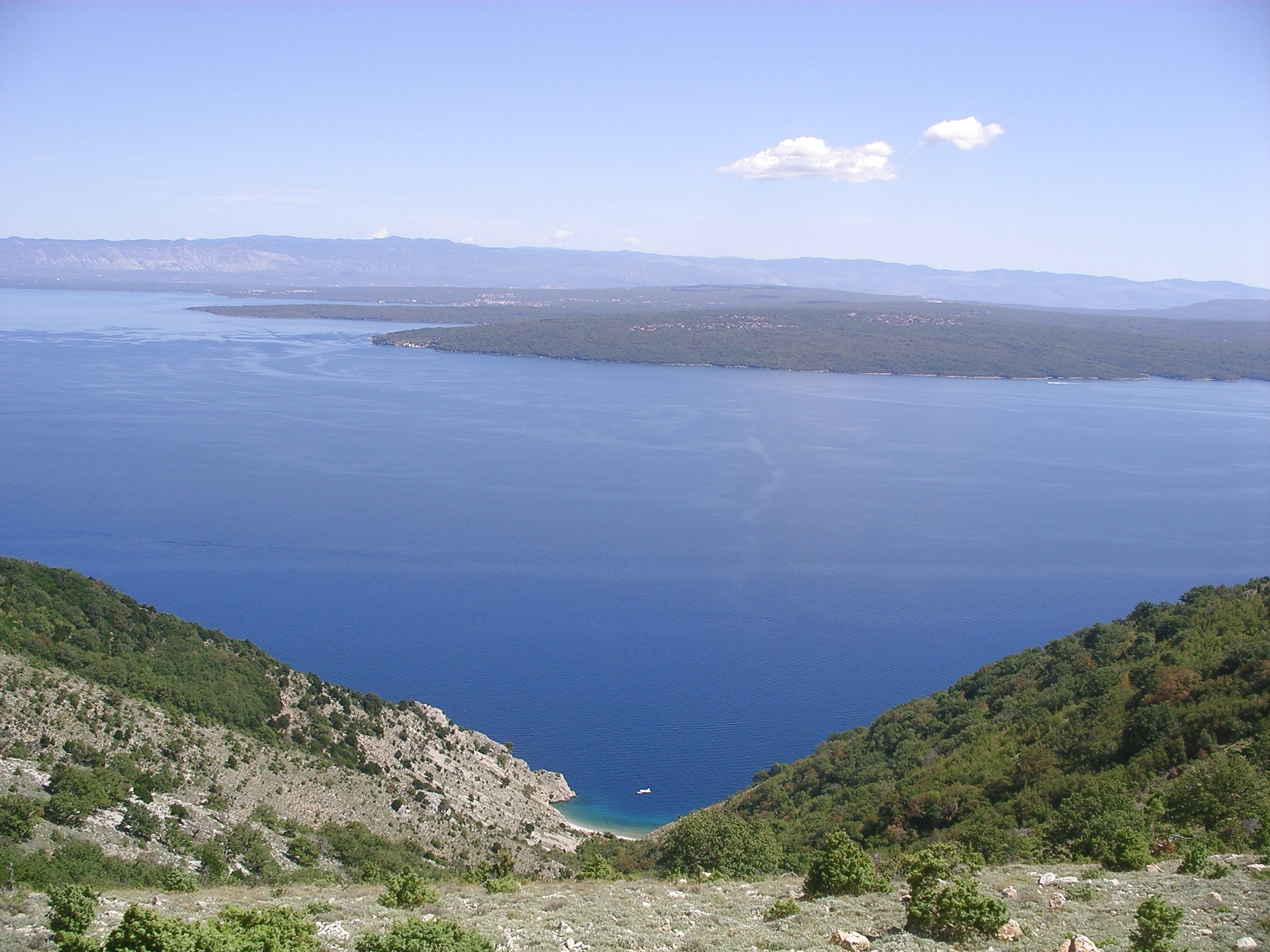
Krk, seen from the island of Cres

Sotovento covers 46.04 square kilometres (17.78 sq mi) of the western town of Krk, on the island of Krk. According to the 2011 census, there were 1,206 inhabitants in 10 settlements:

Settlement	2011 population	Area (km^{2})
Bajčići	131	4.14
Brusići	40	2.79
Brzac	178	5.29
Linardići	139	9.93
Milohnići	87	4.70
Nenadići	157	0.50
Pinezići	196	8.66
Poljice	74	4.79
Skrbčići	146	3.39
Žgaljići	58	1.85

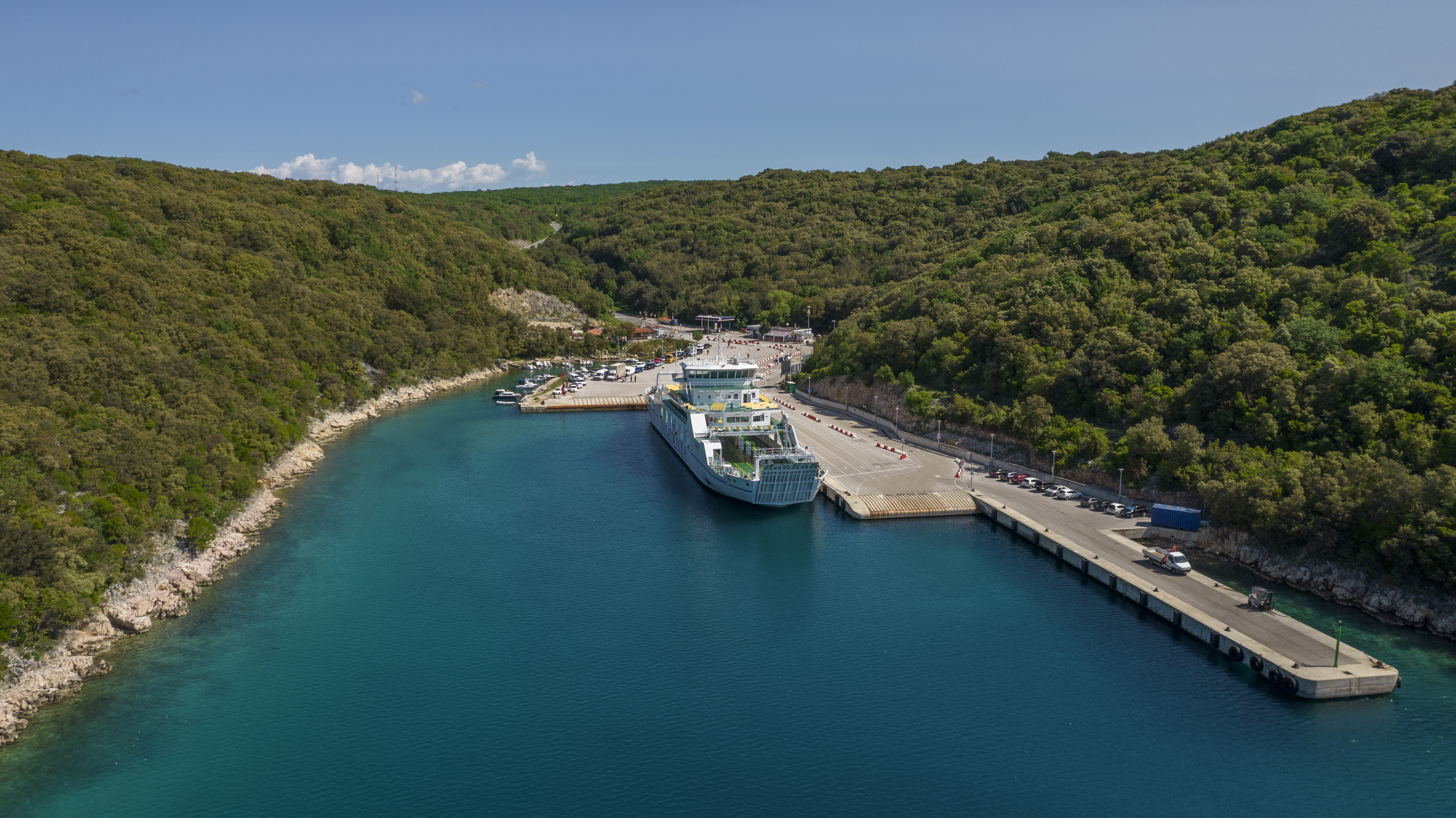
Ferry at Valbiska

Other settlements and sites include Brozici, Kapovci and Glavotok, and the ferry port of Valbiska. Glavotok, the island's westernmost point, belonged to the Frankopan family during the 14th century. At the beginning of the 16th century, the Franciscan Third Order Regular of Saint Francis of Penance built a monastery and several houses. Near Glavotok is an oak forest.

Valbiska has been a dock for ferries on the Valbiska-Merag line, from Krk to the island of Cres, since 2009; this followed ferry lines from Baška to Lopar and Valbiska to Lopar, on the island of Rab. It has a catering facility and a gas station.

The boundary between Šotovento and the rest of Krk begins at the bay of Cavlenet in the northwest and passes the Klobučac and Vrhura mountains, the border with Dubašnica in the north. From Vrh Vrh the boundary runs south to Valbiska, separating Sotovento (in the east) from Vrh and the Picik region. In the west and south are the Middle Gate, the sea channel between Krk and Cres.

== Name ==
Šotovento derives from the Italian sotto (below) and vento (the wind). Located below several small mountains – Vrhzur, 238 metres (781 ft); Kukurik, 176 metres (577 ft) and Skrlat, 144 metres (472 ft) – it is protected from the bora. This protection, and its southwest orientation, favored vegetation.

== History ==
Šotovento has always been part of the town of Krk. When the Croats arrived on the island of Krk during the 7th century, they settled on its eastern part. Many place names in the west, therefore, remain Romance rather than Slavic in origin.

When Ivan VII Frankapan (who owned the island of Krk) decided to expand his holdings during the 15th century to increase tax revenue, Vlachs had settled in Dubasnica, Šotovento and northern Dobrinj. They spoke the Krčurumunj language, whose last speaker (Mate Bajcic) died in 1875. The island was divided into seven municipalities in 1992, and Šotovento remained within the town of Krk.

== Attractions ==
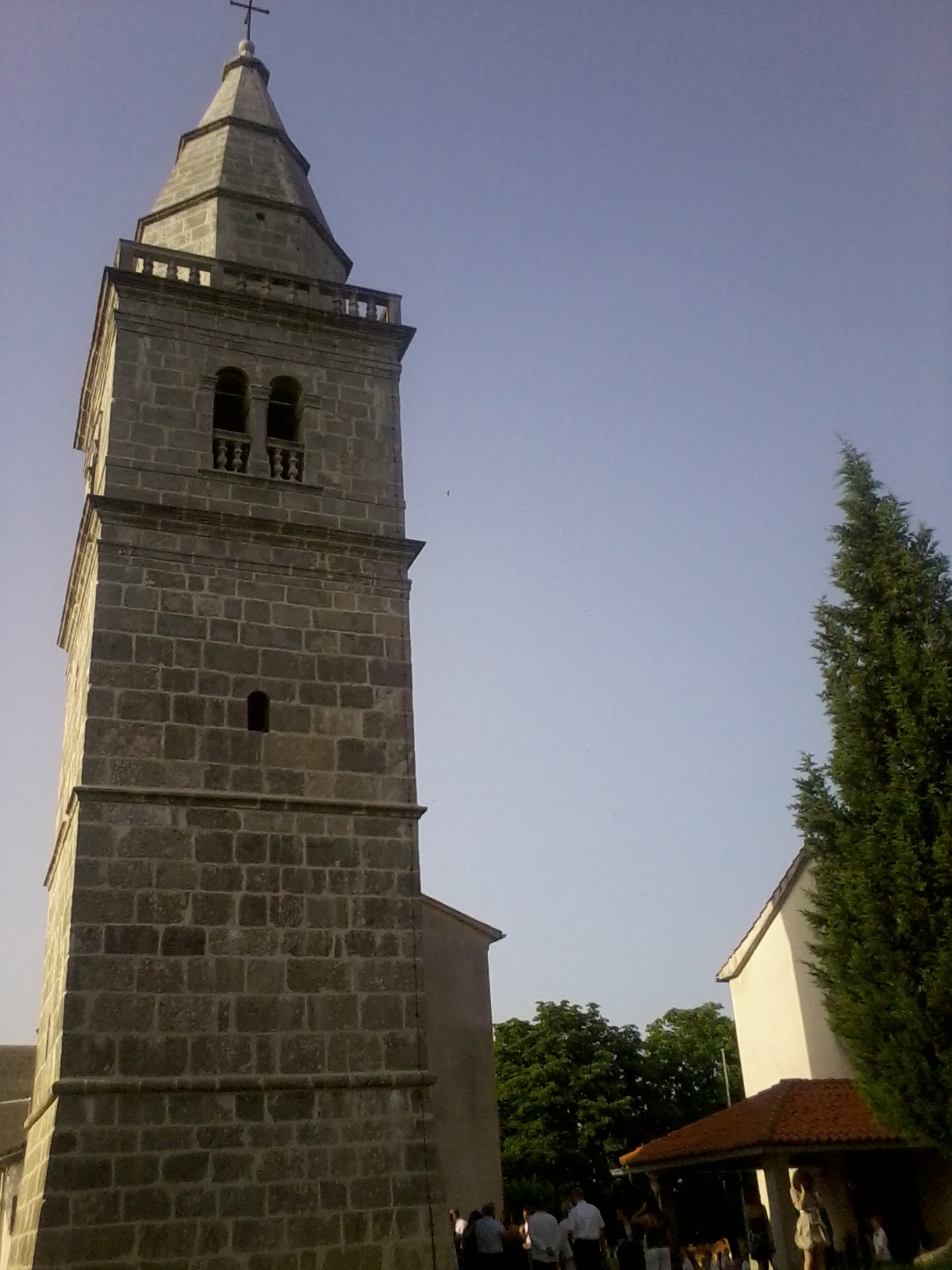
Church in Poljice

Šotovento has a number of churches and other religious buildings:

- Franciscan monastery in Glavotok
- Svete Kuzman church in Poljice
- Church of St. Francis in Skrbčić - Built during the late 16th or early 17th century, it has been renovated and expanded twice.
- Chapel of St. Peter in Brzac – Built in 1693 by Juraj Nenadić Matov and his wife, Kate Zako.
- Chapel of St. Leonarda in Bajčići - Built in 1769
- Chapel of St. Cecilia in Brusići - 1565

Ruins remain of a number of other chapels. Near the monastery at Glavotok is a protected one-hectare oak forest. Several large oaks grow near Cavlent Bay; the largest is over 400 years old and 5.4 metres (18 ft) in diameter.

== Sources ==
- Bolonić, Mihovil and Žic-Rokov, Ivan. "The Island of Krk through the Centuries". The Christian Present, Zagreb (2002)
- The Island of Krk is a Western Part. Historical Society of the Island of Krk (1986)
- Lešić, Denis: The Island of Krk: A Guide in Words and Pictures (2003)
