= Poljica, Krk =

Poljica
- Village
- Location of Poljica in Croatia Poljica (Croatia)
- Coordinates: 45°05′N 14°29′E
- Country: Croatia
- County: Primorje-Gorski Kotar
- Island: Krk

Area
  - Total: 3.3 km^{2} (1.3 sq mi)

Population (2021)
  - Total: 83
  - Density: 25/km^{2} (65/sq mi)
- Time zone: UTC+1 (CET)
  - Summer (DST): UTC+2 (CEST)
- Postal code: 51500
- Area code: 051
- Vehicle registration: RI

Poljica is a village on the island of Krk, Croatia.

== Location ==
Poljica is located on the western part of the island of Krk, in the area of the island called Šotovento. Like all settlements in Šotovento, Poljica is not on the coast but in the interior of the island, about 3 km southeast of Čavlena bay. In the immediate vicinity are the villages Bajčići and Nenadići. Approximately 6 km away is Malinska and about 10 km is the town of Krk.

The village is located just off the D104 Road.

== History ==
In ancient times this area was inhabited by the Illyrians. In the Middle Ages, until the 15th century, this part of the island was predominantly deserted and poorly inhabited. In order to increase tax revenues, Ivan VII Frankopan settled in the mid-15th century in this area and in the area around Dubašnica, and also between the castles of Dobrinj and Omišalj, Vlachs and Morlachs (Romanians, later Istro-Romanians) from Velebit. However, there were very few true ethnic Vlachs among them, most of whom were Croats.

Poljica had the greatest significance in the second half of the 19th century. At about the same time, in 1848, the first school opened in Šotovento. Until then, the only educational institution had been a Franciscan monastery at Glavotok.

== Demographics ==
According to the last census of 2001, there were 62 inhabitants in Poljica.

Population growth has been moderate. Since there have been official data since the middle of the 19th century, Poljica had a mild and gradual increase in population by mid-20th century. In 1953, they had a maximum of 89 residents. Since then, the population has declined slightly.

== Religion ==
Its Catholic parish was founded in 1490, and its parish church was built around 1488. In 1939, its parish had 948 souls, plus 97 outside the country.

List of parish priests of Poljica:

- Antun Fabijanić (b. Omišalj 1879-12-11, primiz Krk 1908-03-02)
  - Chaplain o. Srećko Dujmović T.O.R. (b. Porat 1901-04-23, primiz Krk 1925-04-19)

== Governance ==
=== Local ===
It is the seat of the Local Committee of Poljica, encompassing itself, Bajčići, Brusići, Nenadići and Žgaljići.

== Economy ==
Poljica is surrounded by traditional agricultural land. The most important are field crops, cattle breeding and olive trees. Nearby in Nenadići is a food-processing plant. Much of the residents work in nearby bigger places on the island such as Malinska or Krk.

Due to its in the interior of the island, tourism has not developed. However Poljica is not far from the sea, and it has preserved indigenous architecture with old stone houses.

== Culture ==
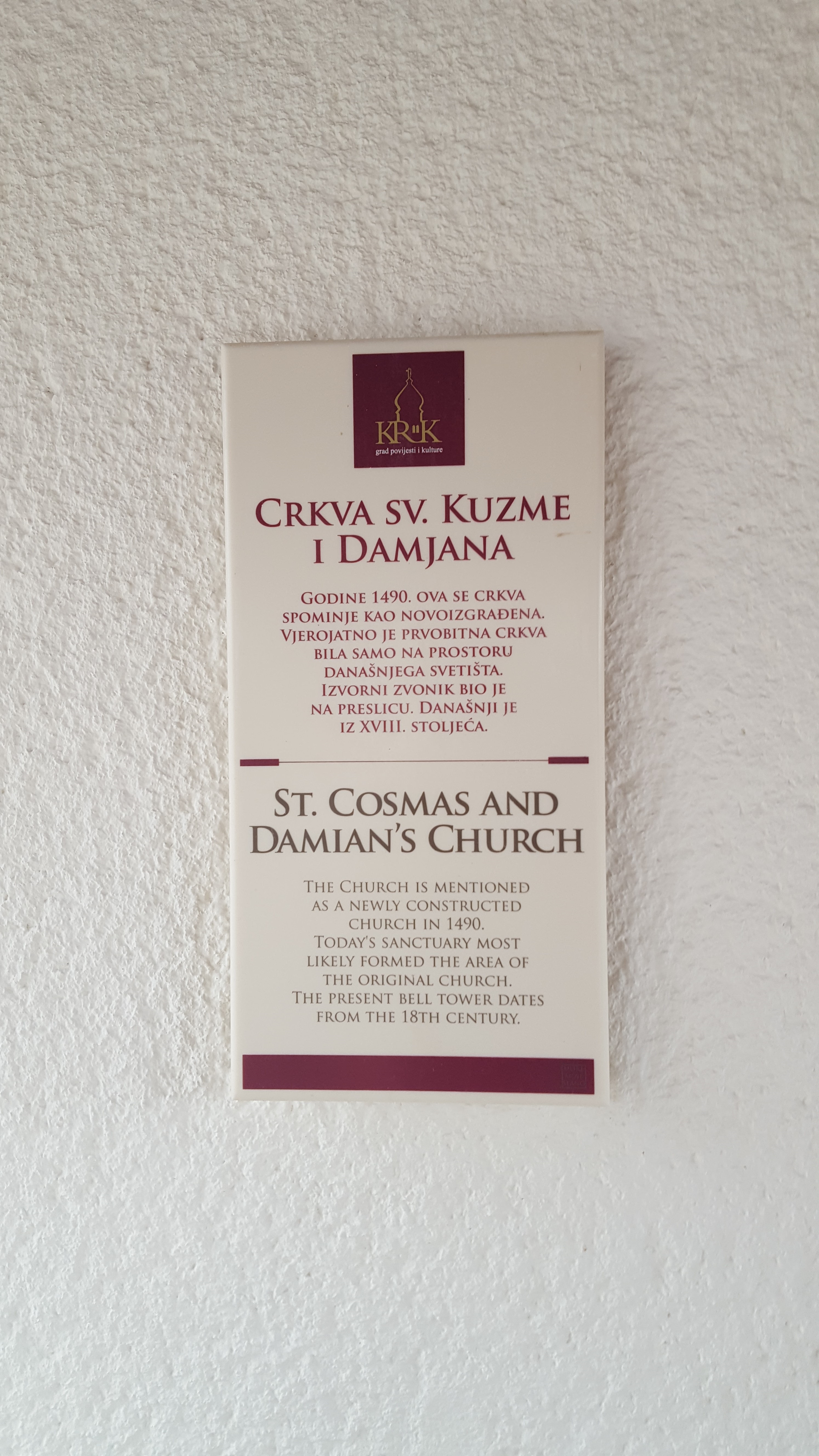
A plaque on the Saints Cosmas and Damian church in the village of Poljica on the island of Krk.

Although a small village, Poljica has many Renaissance buildings. Among them, the bell tower of the parish church of Saints Cosmas and Damian is made of fine chrome stone. It was built in 1768, and before it there was another, smaller tower. At its height of 29 meters dominates the village and the surrounding area.

A beach at Čavlena Bay is 3 km from Poljica.

Nearby in the woods at Čavlena bay there is a small early Christian church of St. Krševan. It is not known who built it, but it is considered to be from the 9th century.

Not far from Poljica, above the Čavlena Bay, there are the largest specimens of oak on the island of Krk. They are considered to be about 400 years old.

The name of the nearby municipality of Malinska-Dubašnica is derived from "Dub", an old Slavic word for oak. Oak forests made the island of Krk attractive for ship builders, dating to Liburnian times.

Frankapan spoke a special language, which today is called the Vegliot dialect or Krčko-Romanian dialect. The last speaker of that dialect was Mate Bajčić Gašpović from Poljica, who died in 1875.

== See also ==
- Republic of Poljica

== Bibliography ==
- Draganović, Krunoslav (1939-04-20). Opći šematizam Katoličke crkve u Jugoslaviji. Sarajevo: Akademija "Regina Apostolorum".
