= D104 road =

Road in Croatia

D104 state road

Route information
- Length: 10.1 km (6.3 mi)

Major junctions
- From: D102 near Malinska
- To: Valbiska ferry port

Location
- Country: Croatia
- Counties: Primorje-Gorski Kotar

Highway system
- Highways in Croatia

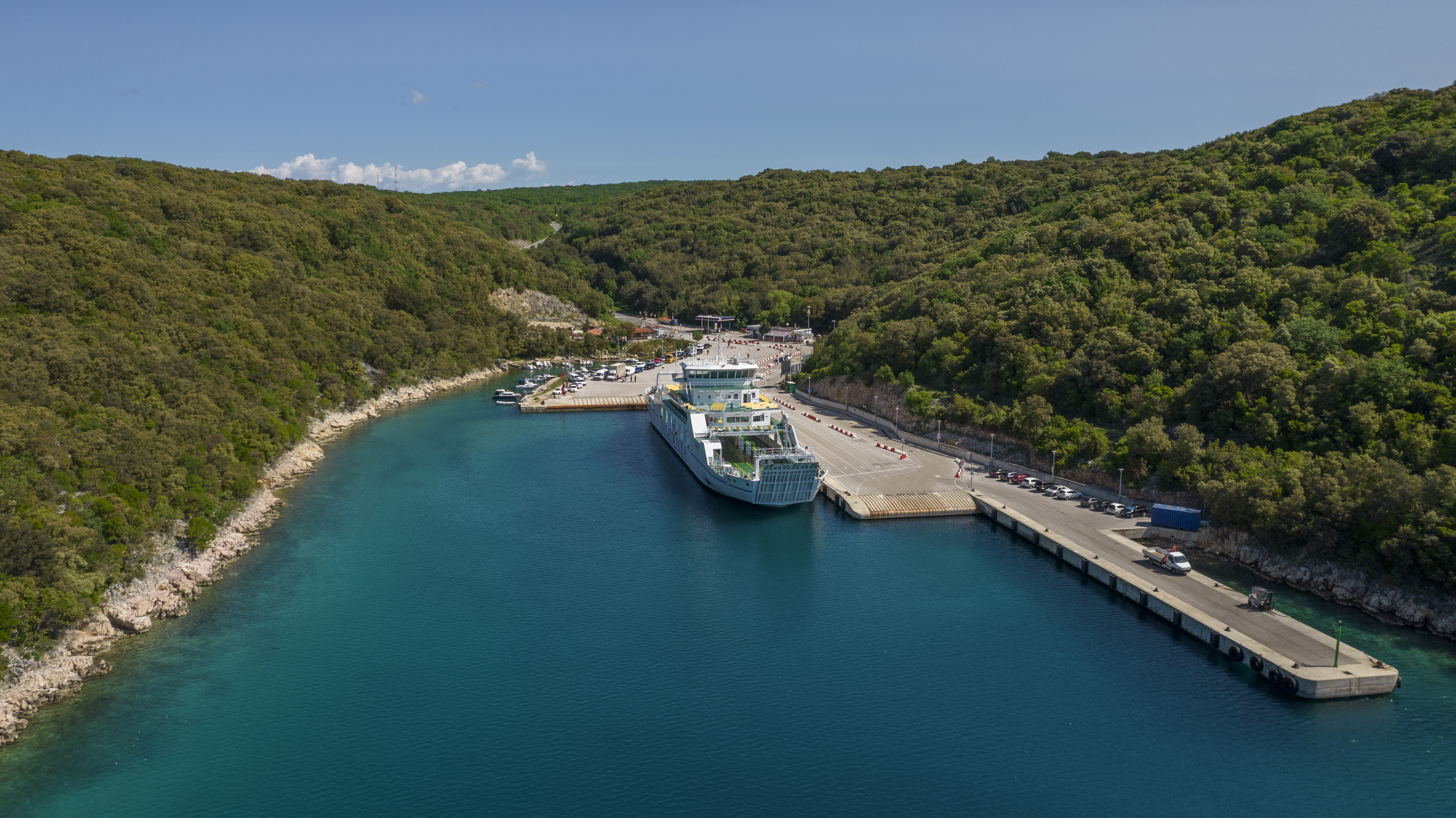
Valbiska, at the southern terminus of D104

D104 branches off to the southwest from D102 near Malinska towards Valbiska ferry port - Jadrolinija ferry access to Merag, island of Cres (D101) and LNP ferry access to Lopar, island of Rab (D105). The road is 10.1 km long.

The road, as well as every other state road in Croatia, is managed and maintained by Hrvatske ceste, a state-owned company.

== Traffic volume ==
Map of Krk showing D104

D104 traffic is not counted directly, however the operator Hrvatske ceste reports the number of vehicles using ferry service flying from Valbiska port, accessed by the D104 road, thereby allowing the D104 traffic volume to be deduced. Substantial variations between annual (AADT) and summer (ASDT) traffic volumes are attributed to the fact that the road serves as a connection carrying substantial tourist traffic to islands of Cres and Rab.

D104 traffic volume
Road	Counting site	AADT	ASDT	Notes
D104	332 Valbiska-Merag ferry	958	1,976	Traffic to the island of Cres only.
D104	338 Valbiska-Lopar ferry	84	230	Traffic to the island of Rab only.
D104	Valbiska ferry port (total)	1,042	2,206	Total D104 traffic volume in Valbiska ferry port.

== Road junctions and populated areas ==
D104 junctions
Type	Slip roads/Notes
	D102 to Rijeka, Crikvenica and A6 and A7 motorways (to the north) and Krk (to the south). Northern terminus of the road.
	L58070 to Malinska
	to Stričići
	L58085 to Poljice and Vrh
	L58086 to Linardići and Vrh
	L58087 to Skrbčići
	L58088 to Pinezići
	Valbiska ferry port - Jadrolinija ferry access to Merag, island of Cres (D101) and LNP ferry access to Lopar, island of Rab (D105). Southern terminus of the road.

== See also ==
- Hrvatske ceste
- Jadrolinija
