= Milohnići =

- Village
- Location within Krk Location within Croatia
- Coordinates: 45.08052°N 14.45746°E
- Country: Croatia
- County: Primorje-Gorski Kotar
- Town: Krk

Area
  - Total: 4.7 km^{2} (1.8 sq mi)

Population (2021)
  - Total: 102
  - Density: 22/km^{2} (56/sq mi)
- Time zone: UTC+1 (CET)
  - Summer (DST): UTC+2 (CEST)

Milohnići is a village on the western end of the Croatian island of Krk, in an area known as Šotovento. Administratively, it is part of the town of Krk. As of 2021, it had 102 inhabitants. Milohnići is surrounded by the nearby villages of Brzac, Linardići, and Poljica.

== Governance ==
=== Local ===
It is the seat of the Local Committee of Milohnići, encompassing itself, Brzac and Linardići.
