= Sveti Vid-Miholjice =

- Village
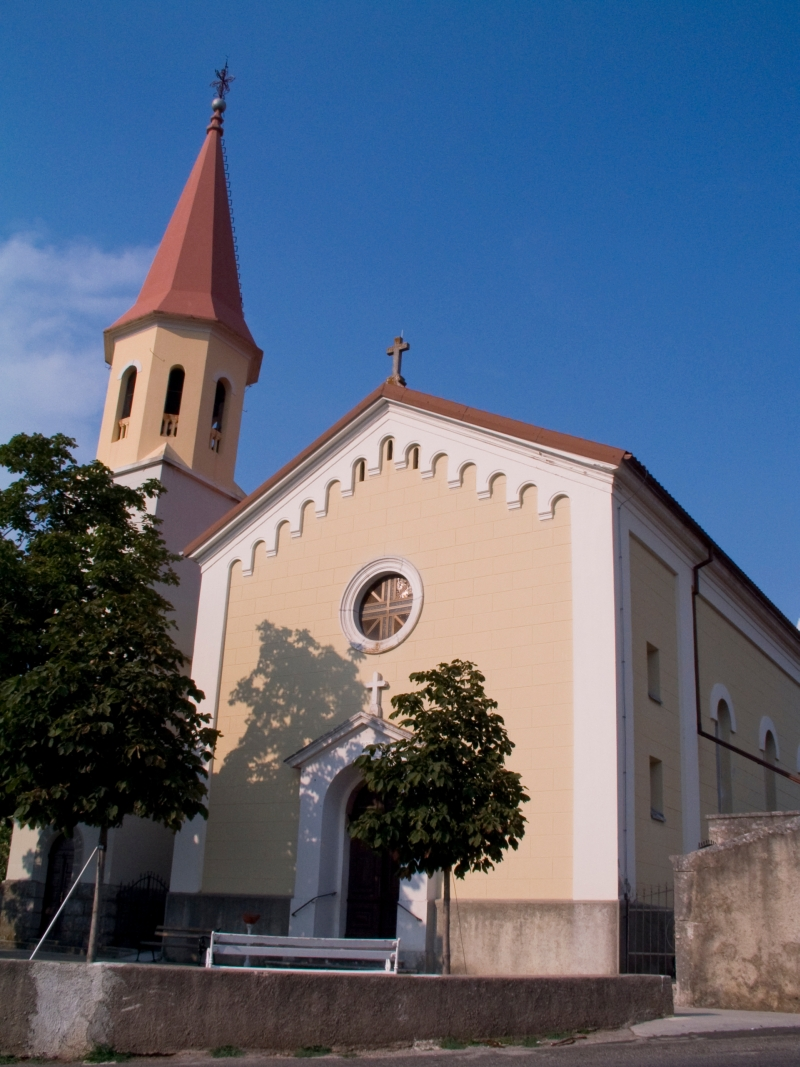
- Parish Church of St. Michael in St. Vid - Miholjica

- Location of Poljice in Croatia Sveti Vid-Miholjice (Croatia)
- Coordinates: 45°07′N 14°32′E
- Country: Croatia
- County: Primorje-Gorski Kotar
- Island: Krk

Area
  - Total: 2.7 km^{2} (1.0 sq mi)

Population (2021)
  - Total: 292
  - Density: 110/km^{2} (280/sq mi)
- Time zone: UTC+1 (CET)
  - Summer (DST): UTC+2 (CEST)
- Postal code: 51500
- Area code: 051
- Vehicle registration: RI

Sveti Vid-Miholjice is a village in the west of the island of Krk, in the Primorje-Gorski Kotar County. Administratively it belongs to the municipality of Malinska-Dubašnica.

Sveti Vid is located in the immediate vicinity of Malinska.

== Description ==
Sveti Vid-Miholjice is a typical Krk village with small stone houses. Because of its authentic appearance, it was placed under the protection of the Ministry of Culture of the Republic of Croatia.

In Scully's Sculpture Area are the remains of an Early Christian church called Cickini from the 6th century. There is a small museum in the village with artifacts from the Cickini archaeology dig.

The parish church of St. Michael is located in the center of the village. In 2019 this church celebrated its 100th anniversary. Every September 29 the village celebrates the day of the church patron.

== Demographics ==
After the municipal seat of Malinska, Sveti Vid-Miholjice is the largest settlement in the Malinska-Dubašnica municipality. According to the 2001 census, there were 292 residents.

The movement of the population of St. Vitus has had no significant growth and decline, as is the case with most of the settlements on the island of Krk. Nevertheless, there is an increase in population growth in the second half of the 19th and early 20th centuries as well as in almost all of the villages; with 219 inhabitants in 1857 to a maximum of 363 inhabitants in 1910. In the mid-20th century, there was stagnation and then depopulation. In 1981 the smallest number of inhabitants of Sveti Vid was recorded since official data existed. Due to the good traffic link and the strong development of tourism in the neighboring Malinska, since 1981, the number of inhabitants has gradually increased.

== Religion ==
Its Catholic parish was founded in 1808, and its parish church was built in 1890. In 1939, its parish had 380 souls, plus 64 outside the country.

List of parish priests of Sveti Vid:

- Josip Bogović (b. Dubašnica, primiz Krk 1901-07-25)

== Governance ==
It is the seat of the Local Committee of Sveti-Vid Miholjice, encompassing itself, Maršići and Sršići.

== Bibliography ==
- Draganović, Krunoslav (1939-04-20). Opći šematizam Katoličke crkve u Jugoslaviji. Sarajevo: Akademija "Regina Apostolorum".
