= Nenadići =

- Village
- Location of Nenadići in Croatia Nenadići (Croatia)
- Coordinates: 45°04′N 14°29′E
- Country: Croatia
- County: Primorje-Gorski Kotar
- Island: Krk

Area
  - Total: 0.8 km^{2} (0.31 sq mi)
- Elevation: 0 m (0 ft)

Population (2021)
  - Total: 164
  - Density: 200/km^{2} (530/sq mi)
- Time zone: UTC+1 (CET)
  - Summer (DST): UTC+2 (CEST)
- Postal code: 51500
- Area code: 051
- Vehicle registration: RI

Nenadići (also known as Nenadic) is a village on the island of Krk.

== Loacation ==
Nenadic is located in the western part of the island of Krk in the area called Šotovento. Namely, the surrounding hills of Vrhure (238 m), Kukurik (176 m), Klobučac (106 m), Škrlat (144 m) protect this part of the island from the bora wind. It is not a coastal resort but it is in the interior of the island.

The village is adjacent to Poljice. It is 6 km from Malinska and 9 km from Krk town.

The village is located just off the D104 Road

== History ==
The emergence of Nenadic was associated with the migration of the Vlaška life that in the middle of the 15th century from Velebit to the area of Šotoventa and Dubašnica was given by the then ruler of the island, Ivan VIII Frankopan

== Population ==
According to the latest census of 2011, there were 157 inhabitants in Nenadic.

Movement of population since the first measurements in 1857 recorded several different stages. The first was the growth phase in the second half of the 19th and early 20th centuries, with the exception of the 1900 census, when a decline in population was recorded. After this long period of population growth, the historical maximum of 168 inhabitants was recorded in 1921. Thereafter followed by a continuous period of population decline on 111 1981 at the turn of the 20th to the 21st century, the number of inhabitants varied; 1991, 147 residents, and in 2001 125.

== Economy ==
Even though Nenadic was a completely agricultural village throughout history, today agriculture and cattle breeding have an important role in the economy of the village, the number of trades has increased in recent years.

Nenadić has the largest food facility on the island of Krk that successfully deals with the processing of fish products.

Since it is one of the more remote settlements on the island of Krk, there is no developed tourist activity.
