= Sabljići =

- Village
- Location within Krk Location within Croatia
- Coordinates: 45.09752°N 14.51423°E
- Country: Croatia
- County: Primorje-Gorski Kotar
- Municipality: Malinska-Dubašnica

Area
  - Total: 3.0 km^{2} (1.2 sq mi)

Population (2021)
  - Total: 31
  - Density: 10/km^{2} (27/sq mi)
- Time zone: UTC+1 (CET)
  - Summer (DST): UTC+2 (CEST)

Sabljići is a village located on the Croatian island of Krk. Located south of Malinska and southwest of Sveti Anton, it is part of the municipality of Malinska-Dubašnica. As of 2021, it had a population of 31.
