= Žgombići =

- Village
- Location within Krk Location within Croatia
- Coordinates: 45.11240°N 14.53849°E
- Country: Croatia
- County: Primorje-Gorski Kotar
- Municipality: Malinska-Dubašnica

Area
  - Total: 0.8 km^{2} (0.31 sq mi)

Population (2021)
  - Total: 72
  - Density: 90/km^{2} (230/sq mi)
- Time zone: UTC+1 (CET)
  - Summer (DST): UTC+2 (CEST)

Žgombići is a village located on the Croatian island of Krk. Located to the south of Malinska, it is part of the municipality of Malinska-Dubašnica. As of 2021, it had 72 inhabitants.
