= Cickini =

Christian church in Krk, Croatia

Cickini is the name of an early Christian church constructed in the 6th century AD. It is located in the village of Sveti Vid-Miholjice within the municipality of Malinska-Dubašnica on the island of Krk, Croatia. It is situated in a forest near an area called Sršić, a few hundred meters from the D102 road.

== History ==
Construction is believed to have started on the site in the 6th century AD at a location of a Roman village that dates to the 1st century. The bishop of Krk used the location as a temporary refuge. It is believed to have been abandoned after the 9th century. In addition to the church there is a 2,500 sq meter residential complex that has yet to be excavated.

== The site today ==
The remains of church was discovered in 2002. A small museum dedicated to the site is located in Sveti Vid. The museum contains artifacts that have been excavated from the site, including tablets

== Citations ==
- Robert Anton Kraljić (July 2017), Cickini (booklet) (in English and Croatian), Rijeka
- Ranko Starac (January 2004), Early Christian Church in "Cickini" Forest near Sršići on the Island of Krk (Report on the first phase of excavations) (journal)
