= Oštrobradić =

- Village
- Location within Krk Location within Croatia
- Coordinates: 45.10684°N 14.53707°E
- Country: Croatia
- County: Primorje-Gorski Kotar
- Municipality: Malinska-Dubašnica

Area
  - Total: 3.8 km^{2} (1.5 sq mi)

Population (2021)
  - Total: 96
  - Density: 25/km^{2} (65/sq mi)
- Time zone: UTC+1 (CET)
  - Summer (DST): UTC+2 (CEST)

Oštrobradić is a village located on the Croatian island of Krk. Located to the south of Malinska, it is part of the municipality of Malinska-Dubašnica. As of 2021, it had 96 inhabitants.
