= Sveti Ivan, Krk =

Sveti Ivan
- Village
- Location within Krk Location within Croatia
- Coordinates: 45.10042°N 14.52807°E
- Country: Croatia
- County: Primorje-Gorski Kotar
- Municipality: Malinska-Dubašnica

Area
  - Total: 1.0 km^{2} (0.39 sq mi)

Population (2021)
  - Total: 89
  - Density: 89/km^{2} (230/sq mi)
- Time zone: UTC+1 (CET)
  - Summer (DST): UTC+2 (CEST)

Sveti Ivan is a village located on the Croatian island of Krk. Located south of Malinska, it is part of the municipality of Malinska-Dubašnica. As of 2021, it had 89 inhabitants. The village is named after John the Evangelist.
