= Barušići, Krk =

Barušići
- Village
- Location within Krk Location within Croatia
- Coordinates: 45.10166°N 14.53682°E
- Country: Croatia
- County: Primorje-Gorski Kotar
- Municipality: Malinska-Dubašnica

Area
  - Total: 3.6 km^{2} (1.4 sq mi)

Population (2021)
  - Total: 33
  - Density: 9.2/km^{2} (24/sq mi)
- Time zone: UTC+1 (CET)
  - Summer (DST): UTC+2 (CEST)

Barušići is a village located on the Croatian island of Krk. Located to the south of Malinska, it is part of the municipality of Malinska-Dubašnica. As of 2021, it had 33 inhabitants.
