= Zidarići =

- Village
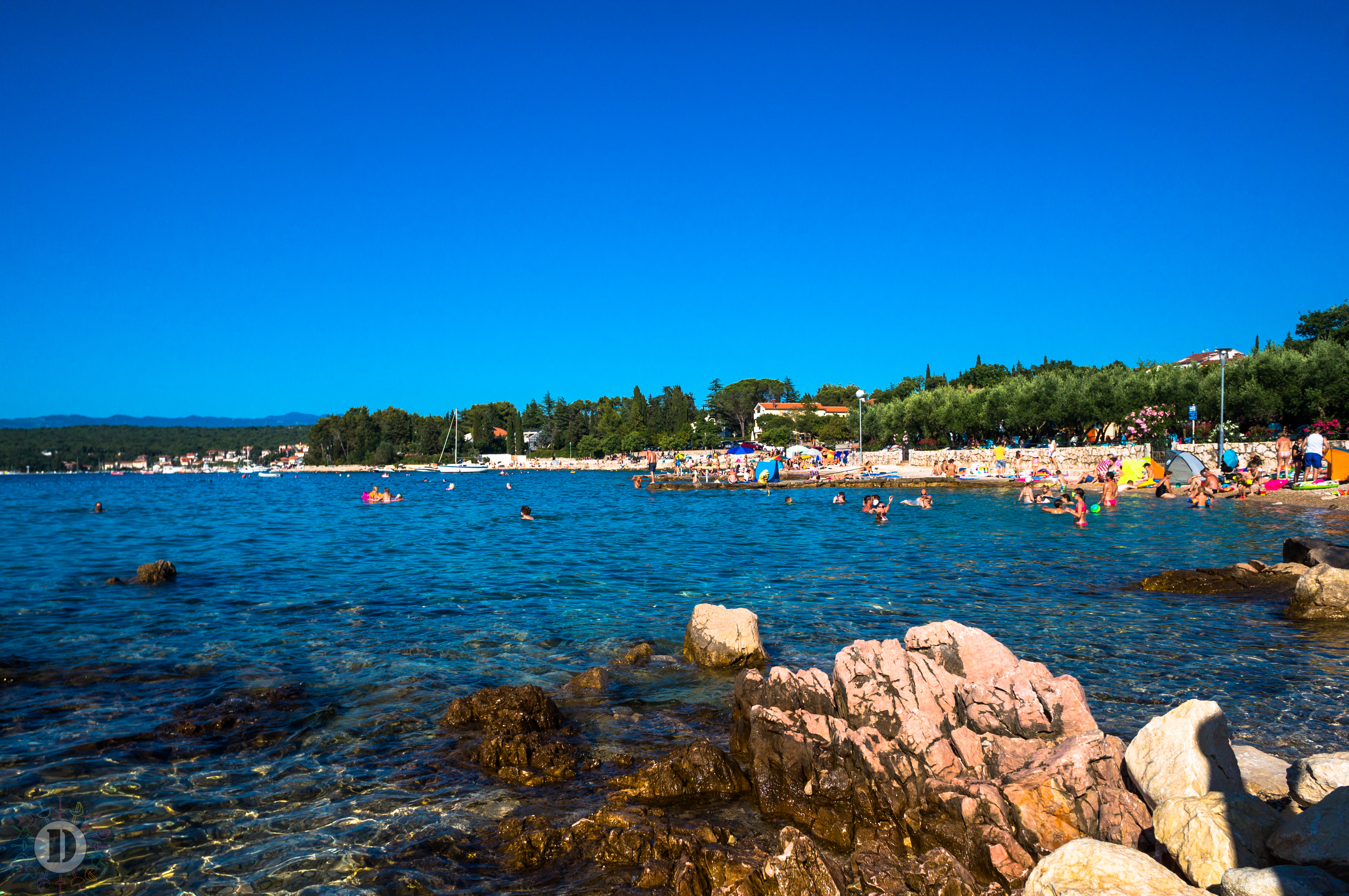
- Rova Beach near Zidarići

- Location within Krk Location within Croatia
- Coordinates: 45.11472°N 14.51427°E
- Country: Croatia
- County: Primorje-Gorski Kotar
- Municipality: Malinska-Dubašnica

Area
  - Total: 0.4 km^{2} (0.15 sq mi)

Population (2021)
  - Total: 142
  - Density: 360/km^{2} (920/sq mi)
- Time zone: UTC+1 (CET)
  - Summer (DST): UTC+2 (CEST)

Zidarići is a village located on the Croatian island of Krk. Located on the coast of the Kvarner Bay and to the east of Malinska, it is part of the municipality of Malinska-Dubašnica. As of 2021, it had 142 inhabitants.
