= Frankopan Castle =

Medieval castle on Krk island, Croatia

Frankopan Castle Frankopanski Kaštel
- Krk, island Krk; Croatia
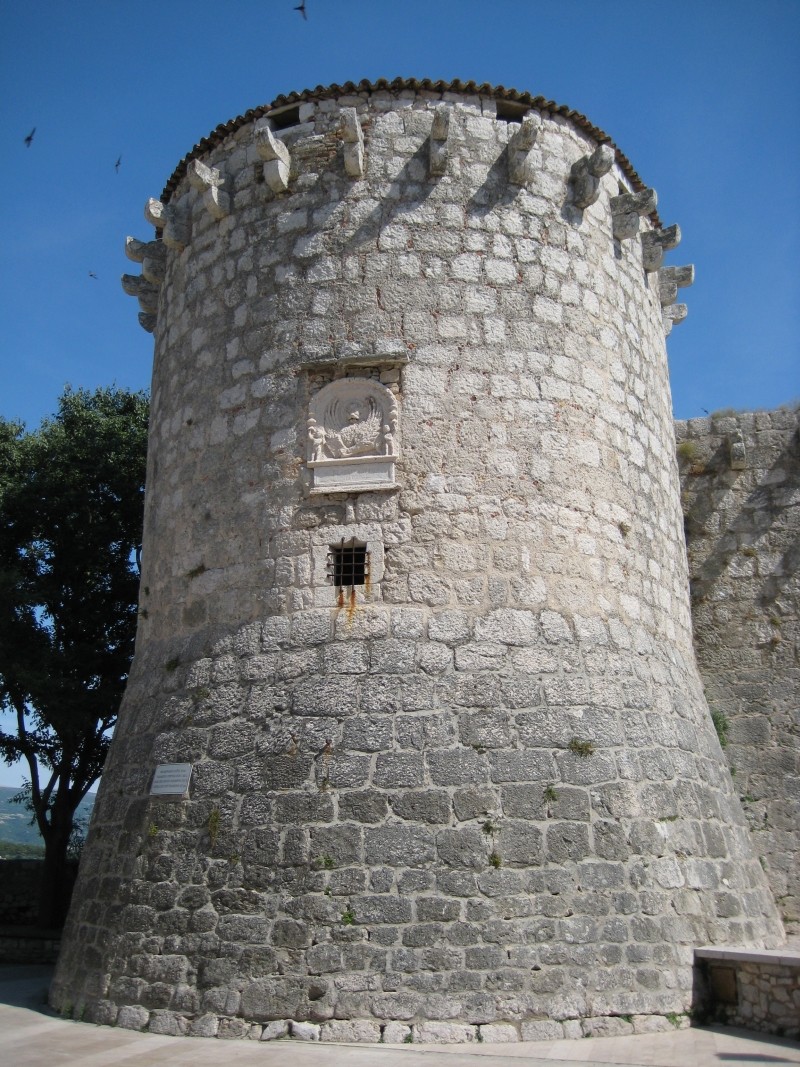
- The round tower of Frankopan Castle

Site information
- Type: Castle
- Controlled by: Roman Catholic Diocese of Krk
- Open to the public: Yes
- Condition: Slightly renovated

Location
- Coordinates: 45.0257°N 14.5764°E

Site history
- Built: 1191
- Built by: Croatian noble family of Frankopan
- Materials: Limestone

Frankopan Castle (Croatian: Frankopanski Kaštel) is a castle located on the southwest coast of the island Krk, in the ancient town of Krk, which is one of the oldest towns in the Adriatic, in Croatia.

== History ==
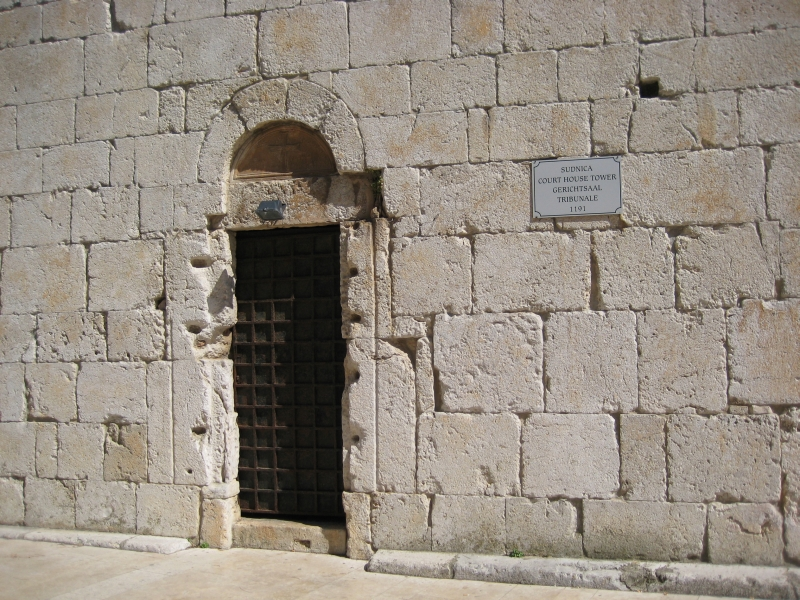
Courtroom from 1191

Frankopan Castle on Kamplin was raised by Croatian noble family of Frankopan through several centuries and several generations. After the death of the first Count (knez) of Krk Dujam I Krčki, his sons continue to dominate over the island and the town of Krk. They left first architectural traces in the town of Krk. The oldest part of fortification is the square tower with the diocese, in which Frankopans courtroom was located. The inscription on the lunette over the entrance confirms that the building was raised in 1191, during the time of Bishop John and counts Vid I and Bartol I (Dujam's sons), with the help of the entire municipality.

The round tower on the northern corner of the castle with a transversely extended lower part, was built after the square, probably in the 13th century. It was restored around 1480, and again around 1600. On the tower there is bricked inscription Aureae Venetorum libertati with lions of St. Mark, which dates from 1500. This cylindrical tower has two floors and attic. On the ground floor once there were two doors, one open to the Kamplin, and the other toward the interior of the castle. On the eastern part of the castle, overlooking the sea there is still a square tower, while on the western part of the castle there was a sentry box for guard. Within the complex there was space for soldiers. It is not known precisely when, but the entire complex was completed before 1348.

== See also ==
- Frankopan
- Krk (town)
