= Sveti Anton, Krk =

Sveti Anton
- Village
- Location within Krk Location within Croatia
- Coordinates: 45.10333°N 14.52299°E
- Country: Croatia
- County: Primorje-Gorski Kotar
- Municipality: Malinska-Dubašnica

Area
  - Total: 0.5 km^{2} (0.19 sq mi)

Population (2021)
  - Total: 162
  - Density: 320/km^{2} (840/sq mi)
- Time zone: UTC+1 (CET)
  - Summer (DST): UTC+2 (CEST)

Sveti Anton is a village located on the Croatian island of Krk. Located to the south of Malinska, it is part of the municipality Malinska-Dubašnica. As of 2021, it had 162 inhabitants. The village is named after Saint Anthony of Padua.
