= Brzac =

- Village
- Location within Krk Location within Croatia
- Coordinates: 45.07827°N 14.44849°E
- Country: Croatia
- County: Primorje-Gorski Kotar
- Town: Krk

Area
  - Total: 5.3 km^{2} (2.0 sq mi)

Population (2021)
  - Total: 174
  - Density: 33/km^{2} (85/sq mi)
- Time zone: UTC+1 (CET)
  - Summer (DST): UTC+2 (CEST)

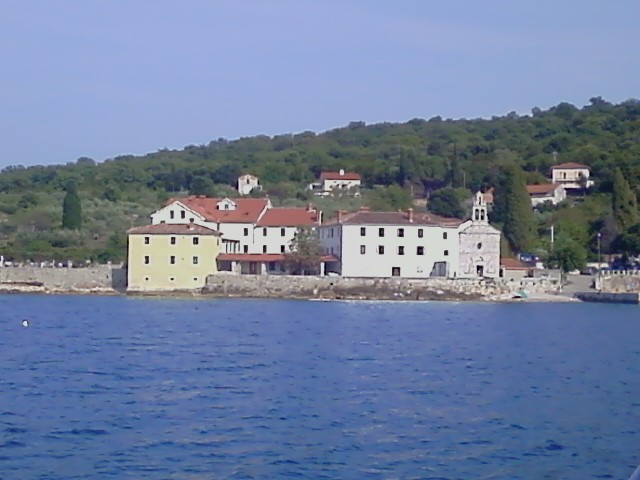
The monastery near Glavotok

Brzac is a village on the western end of the Croatian island of Krk, in an area known as Šotovento. Administratively, Brzac is a part of the town of Krk. As of 2021, it had 174 inhabitants. The Franciscan monastery near Glavotok, founded in the early 16th century, is located just two kilometers to the north of Brzac.
