= Vantačići =

- Village
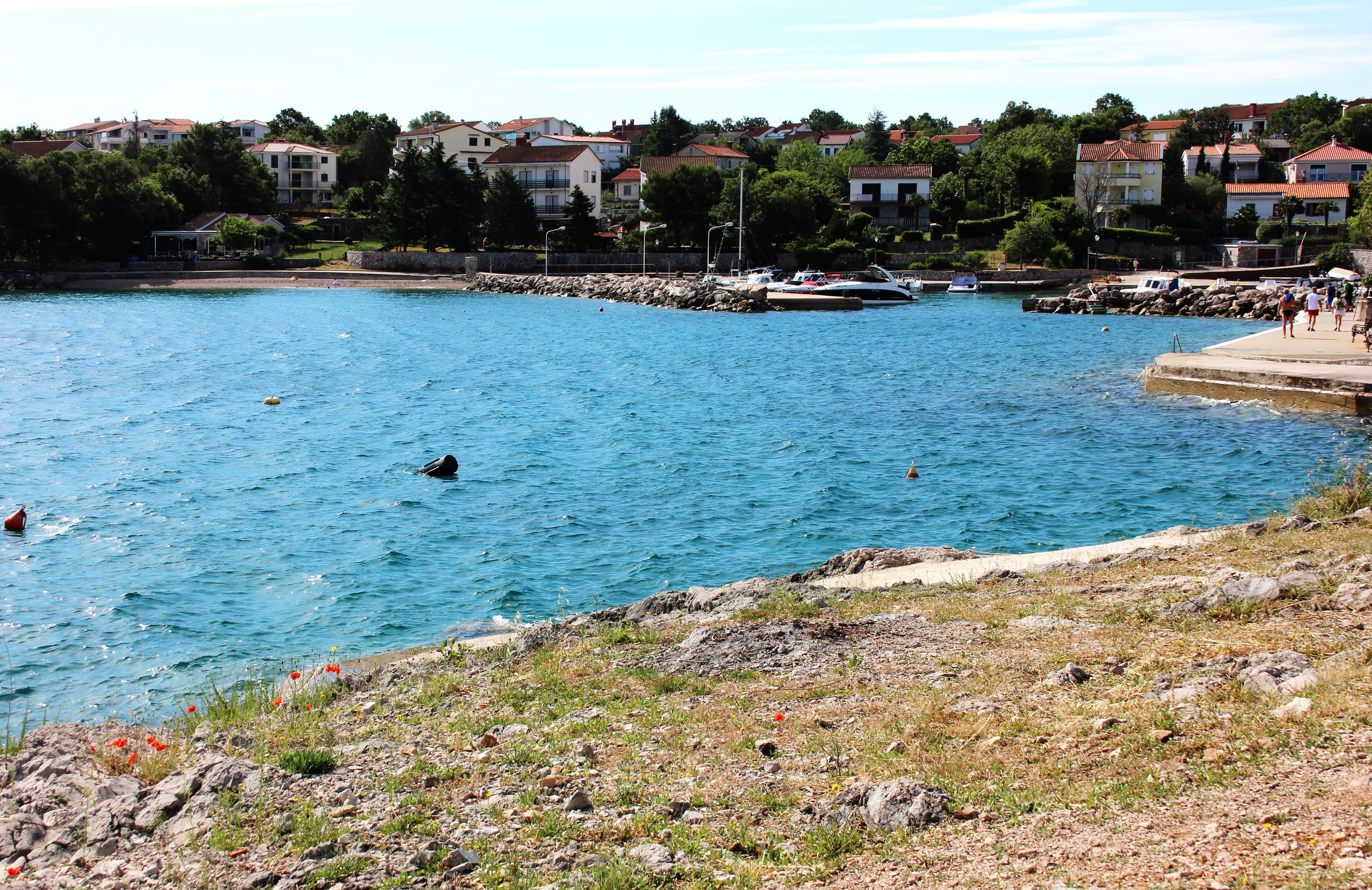
- Vantačići port

- Location within Krk Location within Croatia
- Coordinates: 45.11585°N 14.50265°E
- Country: Croatia
- County: Primorje-Gorski Kotar
- Municipality: Malinska-Dubašnica

Area
  - Total: 2.3 km^{2} (0.89 sq mi)

Population (2021)
  - Total: 186
  - Density: 81/km^{2} (210/sq mi)
- Time zone: UTC+1 (CET)
  - Summer (DST): UTC+2 (CEST)

Vantačići is a village in Croatia on the island of Krk and in the municipality of Malinska-Dubašnica, in Primorje-Gorski Kotar County.

== Demographics ==
In the 2021 census, the village had 186 inhabitants.
