= Porat, Croatia =

Porat
- Village
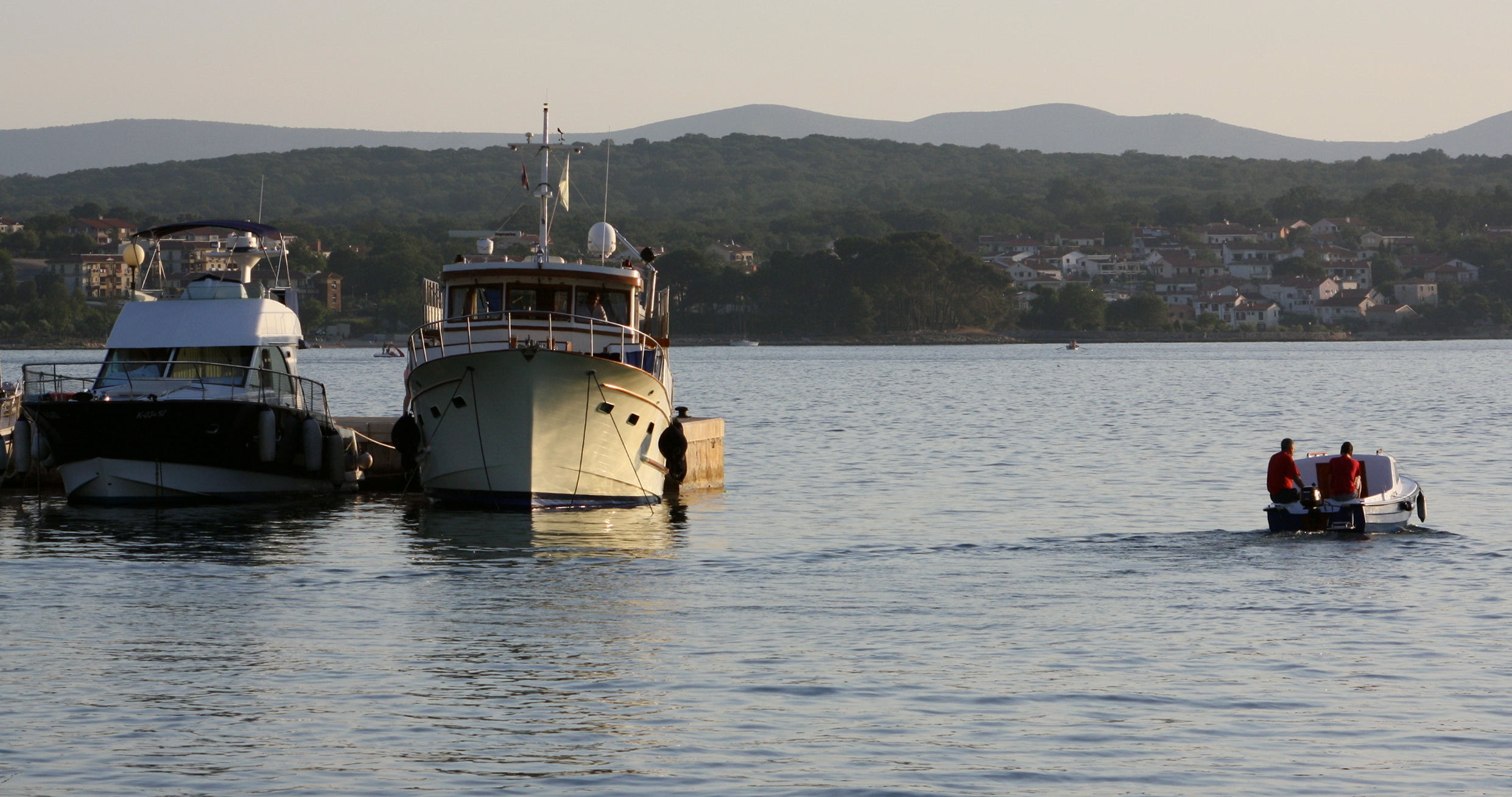
- View of Porat

- Location within Krk Location within Croatia
- Coordinates: 45.12145°N 14.49408°E
- Country: Croatia
- County: Primorje-Gorski Kotar
- Municipality: Malinska-Dubašnica

Area
  - Total: 4.4 km^{2} (1.7 sq mi)

Population (2021)
  - Total: 181
  - Density: 41/km^{2} (110/sq mi)
- Time zone: UTC+1 (CET)
  - Summer (DST): UTC+2 (CEST)

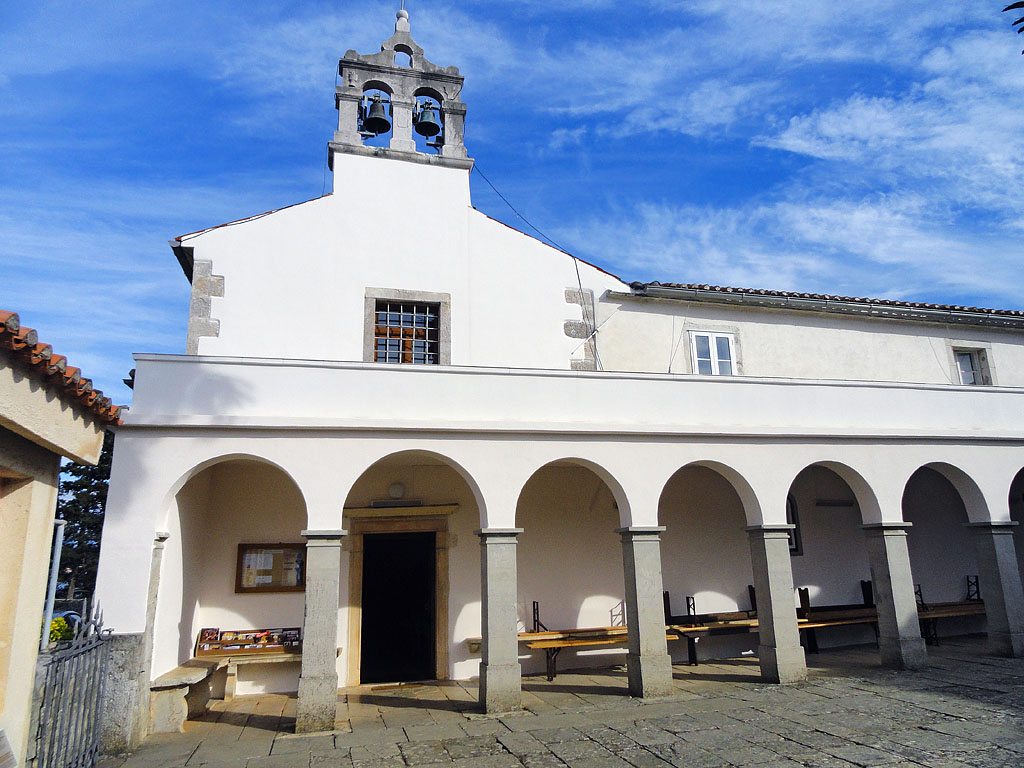
Franciscan monastery in Porat

Porat is a small harbor village on the west coast of the Croatian island of Krk. Located approximately 3 km to the west of Malinska, it is part of the Malinska-Dubašnica municipality. As of 2021, it had 181 inhabitants. The village has a harbor providing access to the Kvarner Bay. A Franciscan monastery dedicated to Mary Magdalene is located in Porat, dating back to the late 15th century.
