= Dubašnica =

Region and former village in Krk, Croatia

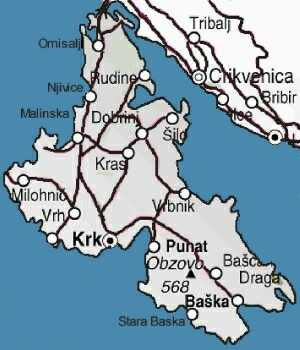
A map of Krk, with Malinska at its northwest. Dubašnica was located at the south of this village.

Dubašnica (Italian: Dubasnizza) was a village in the northwestern part of the island of Krk, now in Croatia, at the south of Malinska and near Poljica. It was first mentioned in the 15th century and became extinct in the 18th century as a result of a malaria epidemic. For centuries, Dubašnica was the seat of a municipality that grouped several villages in the region, but after its disappearance, the seat was moved to Bogovići and later to Malinska. Today, this municipality is known as Malinska-Dubašnica, and although its capital is still Malinska, it retains Dubašnica in its name. Nowadays, Dubašnica may also refer to a region made up of all these villages constituting the municipality of Malinska-Dubašnica.

The areas of Dubašnica and Poljica, as well as the land between the castles of Dobrinj and Omišalj, were settled by Vlachs and Morlachs (Romanians) during the second half of the 15th century. This was due to the need for more manpower by Ivan VII Frankopan, prince of the Principality of Krk since 1451. These Romanians, who originally were shepherds, would end up diverging into Istro-Romanians and would form a community on the island with their own dialect, called by some Croatian scholars as "Krko-Romanian", which ended up influencing the local Croatian dialect of the region. The last speaker of the Istro-Romanian dialect of Krk would die in 1875, although Romanian numbering would still be used in the island during the 20th century.

== Religion ==
Its Catholic parish was founded in the 15th/16th century, and its parish church was built in 1857 (the old parish church was built in 1514). In 1939, its parish had 2150 souls, plus 280 outside the country.

List of parish priests of Dubašnica:

- Ivan Ilijić (b. Omišalj 1882-09-17, primiz Krk 1907-09-08)
  - Chaplain o. Benko Žgombić T.O.R. (b. Dubašnica 1876-08-18, primiz 1899-09-23)

== Gallery ==
Glagolitic rural chapter book of Dubašnica, 1820–1846

== Notable people ==
- Ivan Milčetić (1853–1921)

== Bibliography ==
- Draganović, Krunoslav (20 April 1939). Opći šematizam Katoličke crkve u Jugoslaviji. Sarajevo: Akademija "Regina Apostolorum".
