= Skrbčići =

Skrbčići Skrpčići
- Village
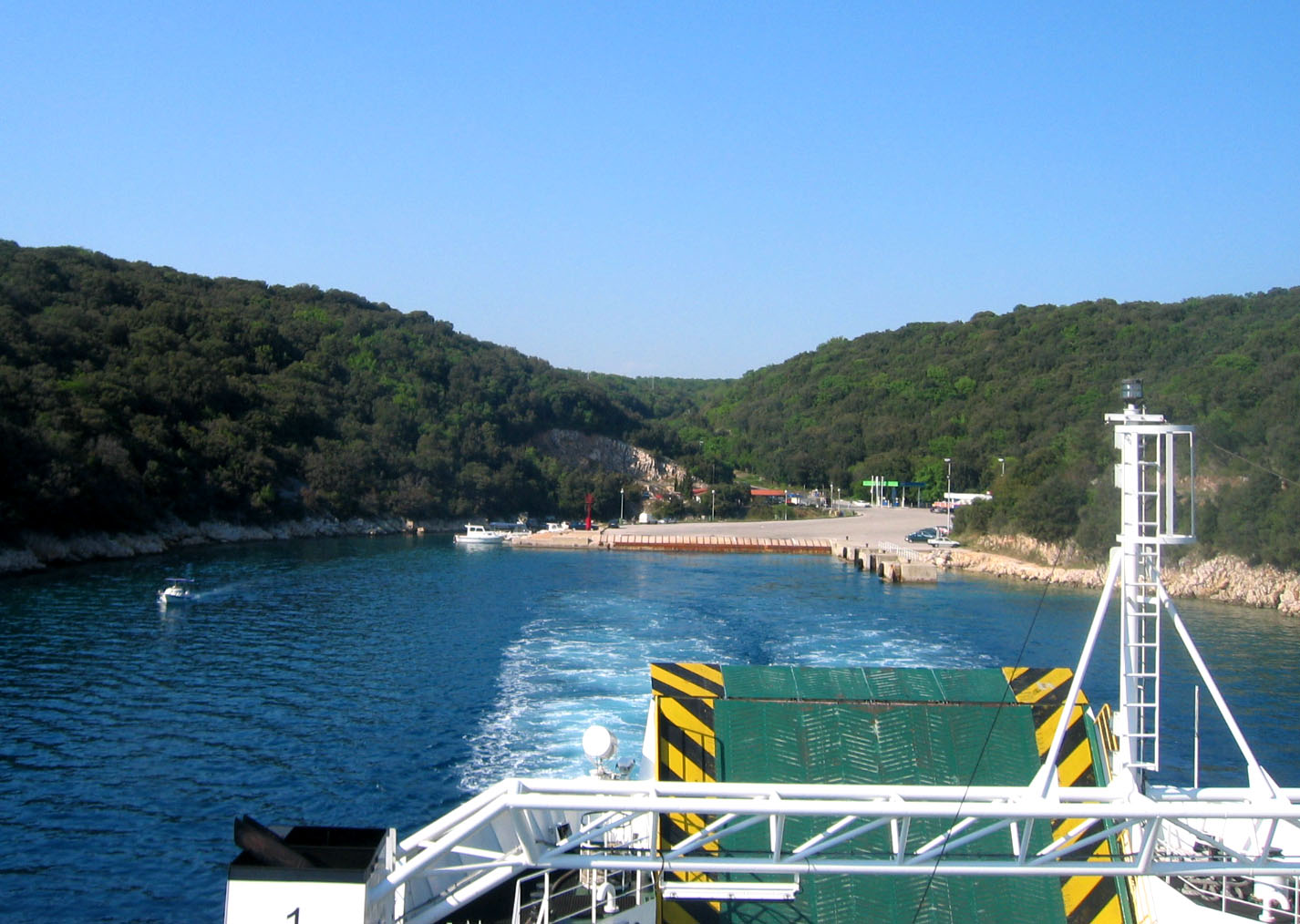
- Valbiska ferry terminal near Skrbčići

- Location within Krk Location within Croatia
- Coordinates: 45.04939°N 14.49182°E
- Country: Croatia
- County: Primorje-Gorski Kotar
- Town: Krk

Area
  - Total: 2.7 km^{2} (1.0 sq mi)

Population (2021)
  - Total: 173
  - Density: 64/km^{2} (170/sq mi)
- Time zone: UTC+1 (CET)
  - Summer (DST): UTC+2 (CEST)

Skrbčići (Chakavian: Skrpčići) is a village located on the Croatian island of Krk. Administratively, it is part of the town of Krk. It is located just to the northeast of Pinezići and to the west of Vrh. As of 2021, it had 173 inhabitants.
