= Žgaljići =

Žgaljići Žgaljić
- Village
- Location within Krk Location within Croatia
- Coordinates: 45.06313°N 14.48472°E
- Country: Croatia
- County: Primorje-Gorski Kotar
- Town: Krk

Area
  - Total: 2.7 km^{2} (1.0 sq mi)

Population (2021)
  - Total: 70
  - Density: 26/km^{2} (67/sq mi)
- Time zone: UTC+1 (CET)
  - Summer (DST): UTC+2 (CEST)

Žgaljići (Chakavian: Žgaljić) is a village located on the western end of the Croatian island of Krk, in an area known as Šotovento. Administratively, it is part of the town of Krk. As of 2021, it had 70 inhabitants.
