= Bogovići, Croatia =

Bogovići
- Location of Bogovići in Croatia
- Coordinates: 45°07′07″N 14°31′46″E
- Country: Croatia
- County: Primorje-Gorski Kotar County
- Municipality: Malinska-Dubašnica

Area
  - Total: 0.7 km^{2} (0.27 sq mi)
- Elevation: 38 m (125 ft)

Population (2021)
  - Total: 348
  - Density: 500/km^{2} (1,300/sq mi)
- Time zone: UTC+1 (CET)
  - Summer (DST): UTC+2 (CEST)
- Postal code: 51511

Bogovići (Italian: Bogovici) is a village in the Primorje-Gorski Kotar County, Croatia. Administratively it belongs to the municipality of Malinska-Dubašnica. In 2021, its population was 348 people.
