= Brusići =

Brusići Brusić
- Village
- Location within Krk Location within Croatia
- Coordinates: 45.06145°N 14.50772°E
- Country: Croatia
- County: Primorje-Gorski Kotar
- Town: Krk

Area
  - Total: 3.7 km^{2} (1.4 sq mi)

Population (2021)
  - Total: 43
  - Density: 12/km^{2} (30/sq mi)
- Time zone: UTC+1 (CET)
  - Summer (DST): UTC+2 (CEST)

Brusići (Chakavian: Brusić) is a village located on the Croatian island of Krk. Administratively, it is part of the town of Krk. As of 2021, it had 43 inhabitants. A chapel devoted to Saint Cecilia is located in the village.
