= Linardići =

- Village
- Location within Krk Location within Croatia
- Coordinates: 45.07359°N 14.46502°E
- Country: Croatia
- County: Primorje-Gorski Kotar
- Town: Krk

Area
  - Total: 8.5 km^{2} (3.3 sq mi)

Population (2021)
  - Total: 151
  - Density: 18/km^{2} (46/sq mi)
- Time zone: UTC+1 (CET)
  - Summer (DST): UTC+2 (CEST)

Linardići is a village located on the western end of the Croatian island of Krk, in an area known as Šotovento. Administratively, it is part of the town of Krk. As of 2021, it had 151 inhabitants.

== Religion ==
Its Catholic parish was founded in 1740, and its parish church was built in 1886. In 1939, its parish had 703 souls, plus 62 outside the country.

List of parish priests of Linardići:

- Nikola Marulić (b. Baška 1912-08-29, primiz Krk 1936-06-28)

== Bibliography ==
- Draganović, Krunoslav (1939-04-20). Opći šematizam Katoličke crkve u Jugoslaviji. Sarajevo: Akademija "Regina Apostolorum".
