= Bajčići =

- Location of Bajčići in Croatia
- Coordinates: 45°4′30″N 14°30′15″E
- Country: Croatia
- County: Primorje-Gorski Kotar County
- Town: Krk

Area
  - Total: 4.0 km^{2} (1.5 sq mi)
- Elevation: 165 m (541 ft)

Population (2021)
  - Total: 123
  - Density: 31/km^{2} (80/sq mi)
- Time zone: UTC+1 (CET)
  - Summer (DST): UTC+2 (CEST)
- Postal code: 51511

Bajčići (Italian: Baicici) is a village in the island of Krk, in the Primorje-Gorski Kotar County, Croatia. Mate Bajčić Gašpović, who was from here, was the last speaker of the Istro-Romanian language in Krk. He died in 1875.

== Population ==
Population number according to the census
1857	1869	1880	1890	1900	1910	1921	1931	1948	1953	1961	1971	1981	1991	2001	2011
133	146	153	144	150	158	155	161	180	168	131	112	100	114	127	131
