= Glavotok =

- Village
- Location of Glavotok in Croatia Glavotok (Croatia)
- Coordinates: 45°05′N 14°26′E
- Country: Croatia
- County: Primorje-Gorski Kotar
- Island: Krk

Population (2001)
  - Total: 30
- Time zone: UTC+1 (CET)
  - Summer (DST): UTC+2 (CEST)
- Postal code: 51511
- Area code: 051
- Vehicle registration: RI

Glavotok is a village on the island of Krk, Croatia. It is situated in the westernmost part of the island, 17 km from the city of Krk.

== History ==
Its history dates to the 14th century when it was feudal land under the Frankopan family. In 1473 the land was given to the Third Order Regular of Saint Francis of Penance. The franciscan monastery is still active to this day.

== Economy ==
Glavotok is a tourist destination due to its cultural and historical heritage and nature, with a protected forest reserve in the vicinity of the village.
