= Vrh, Krk =

Vrh
- Village
- Interactive map of Vrh
- Location of Vrh within Croatia
- Coordinates: 45°03′00″N 14°31′49″E
- Country: Croatia
- County: Primorje-Gorski Kotar
- Municipality: Krk

Area
  - Total: 18.7 km^{2} (7.2 sq mi)
- Elevation: 199 m (653 ft)

Population (2021)
  - Total: 939
  - Density: 50.2/km^{2} (130/sq mi)
- Time zone: UTC+1 (CET)
  - Summer (DST): UTC+2 (CEST)
- Postal code: 51500 Krk
- Area code: +385 (0)51
- Vehicle registration: RI

Vrh is a village on the island of Krk in Primorje-Gorski Kotar County, Croatia.

== Religion ==
Its Catholic parish was founded in 1840, and its parish church was built in 1870. In 1939, its parish had 564 souls.

List of parish priests of Vrh:

- Mirko Markotić (b. 1904-09-02, primiz Ruma 1932-09-27)

== Governance ==
=== Local ===
It is the seat of its own local committee.

== Bibliography ==
- Draganović, Krunoslav (1939-04-20). Opći šematizam Katoličke crkve u Jugoslaviji. Sarajevo: Akademija "Regina Apostolorum".
