= Malinska-Dubašnica =

- Municipality
- Malinska-Dubašnica Municipality; Općina Malinska-Dubašnica
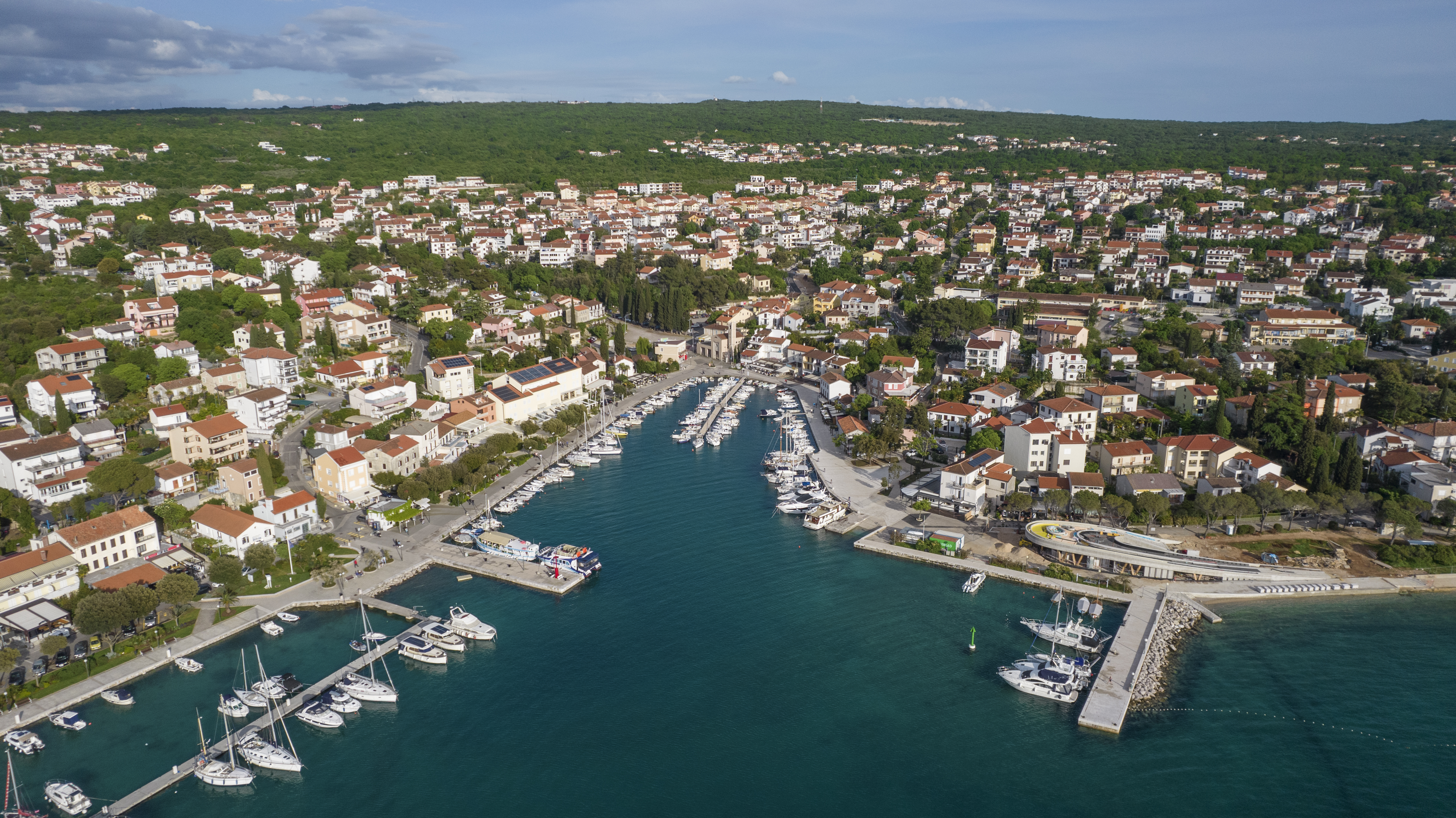
- Malinska

- Location within Croatia
- Coordinates: 45°07′13″N 14°31′37″E
- Country: Croatia
- County: Primorje-Gorski Kotar County

Government
  - Mayor: Robert Anton Kraljić (HNS),
  - City Council: 13 members: HNS-SDP-PGS-HSU (8); _; HDZ-HDS (3); _; HSP (1); _; HSS (1)

Population (2021)
  - Total: 3,212
- Time zone: UTC+1 (CET)
  - Summer (DST): UTC+2 (CEST)
- Postal code: 51511
- Area code: 051
- Vehicle registration: RI
- Website: www.malinska.hr

Malinska-Dubašnica is a municipality in the Primorje-Gorski Kotar county on the island Krk of in western Croatia. Its centre is Malinska. There were 3,212 inhabitants, of whom 90% were ethnic Croats at the 2021 census. It was established as a municipality in 1993.

The municipal government is located in the town hall. Built in 1920, it is the former hotel Jadran.

The name of the municipality comes from the former village of Dubašnica. It had been the seat of the municipality grouping the villages of modern Malinska-Dubašnica for centuries before its disappearance by a malaria epidemic in the 18th century. Today, Dubašnica can also refer to a region that covers the same villages and territory as Malinska-Dubašnica. The name is derived from "Dub", an old Slavic word for oak. Oak forests made the island attractive for ship builders, dating to Liburnian times.

Malinska harbor was used as a port due to its protection from bura wind as well as its depth.

== Population ==
Historical population
Year	Pop.	±%
1857	1,704	—
1869	1,873	+9.9%
1880	2,000	+6.8%
1890	2,093	+4.6%
1900	2,120	+1.3%
1910	2,134	+0.7%
1921	2,003	−6.1%
1931	1,981	−1.1%
1948	1,807	−8.8%
1953	1,755	−2.9%
1961	1,589	−9.5%
1971	1,502	−5.5%
1981	1,688	+12.4%
1991	2,161	+28.0%
2001	2,726	+26.1%
2011	3,134	+15.0%
2021	3,212	+2.5%
Source: Naselja i stanovništvo Republike Hrvatske 1857–2021, DZS

The following settlements are located within the municipality, listed here with their respective population.

- Malinska - 816
- Barušići - 33
- Bogovići - 348
- Kremenići - 96
- Ljutići - 8
- Maršići - 17
- Milčetići - 251
- Milovčići - 166
- Oštrobradić - 96
- Porat - 181
- Radići - 207
- Sabljići - 31
- Sršići - 0
- Strilčići - 2
- Sveti Anton - 162
- Sveti Ivan - 89
- Sveti Vid Miholjice - 292
- Turčić - 17
- Vantačići - 186
- Zidarići - 142
- Žgombići - 72

== Partner communities ==
- Güttenbach (Croatian: Pinkovac)

== Notable residents ==
- Branko Fučić
