= Krk (town) =

- Town
- Grad Krk; Town of Krk
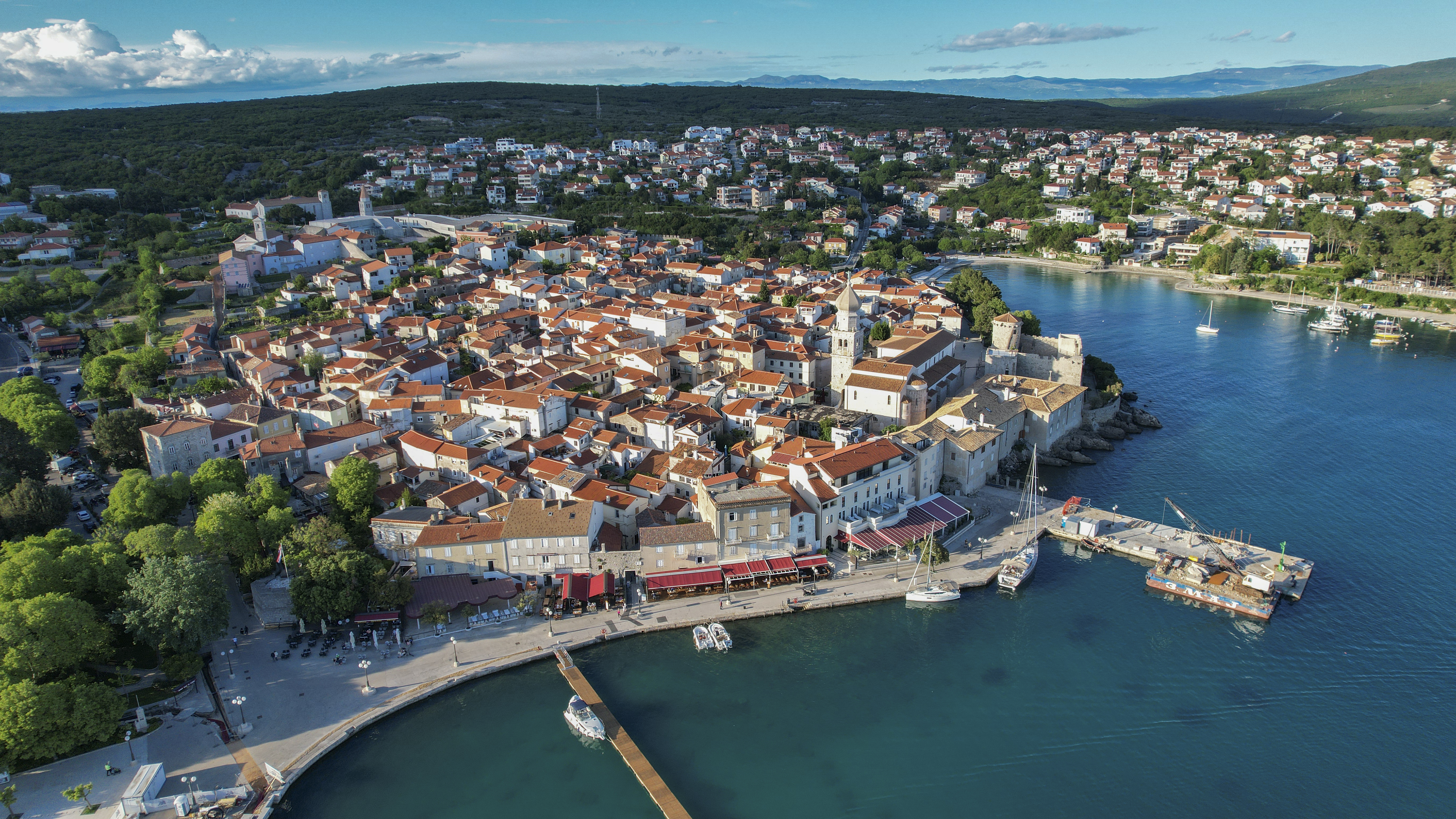
- Krk old town

- Location of Krk in west Croatia Krk (Croatia)
- Coordinates: 45°01′N 14°34′E
- Country: Croatia
- Region: Central Croatia (Croatian Littoral)
- County: Primorje-Gorski Kotar County
- Island: Krk

Government
  - Mayor: Darijo Vasilić (PGS)
  - City Council: 15 members: • PGS, SDP, HSLS (8); • HNS, HSU, ZS (3); • HDZ, HSP (2); • Independents (2)

Area
  - Town: 107.1 km^{2} (41.4 sq mi)
  - Urban: 18.4 km^{2} (7.1 sq mi)
- Elevation: 0 m (0 ft)

Population (2021)
  - Town: 6,816
  - Density: 63.64/km^{2} (164.8/sq mi)
  - Urban: 3,935
  - Urban density: 214/km^{2} (554/sq mi)
- Time zone: UTC+1 (CET)
  - Summer (DST): UTC+2 (CEST)
- Postal code: 51 500
- Area code: 051
- Vehicle registration: RI
- Website: grad-krk.hr

Krk is the main settlement of the island of Krk, west Croatia. It is located on the southwest coast of the island and is the historical seat of the Roman Catholic Diocese of Krk. The name Krk comes from the Latin name for the island, Curictarum.

== History ==
The city is ancient, being among the oldest in the Adriatic Sea. It has been continuously inhabited since ancient times including the Illyrians and later the Romans, and was once part of the Byzantine Theme Dalmatia after the Western Roman Empire had fallen to the barbarians.

The city had also preserved many medieval fortifications, including Frankopan Castle close to the Kamplin park, and part of the city walls built during the five centuries when the Republic of Venice ruled the city.

Roman ruins can be seen today in some parts of the town, for example mosaics in some houses. A temple to the Roman goddess Venus was discovered near the small gate (mala vrata) in the old city. This is the only temple dedicated to the goddess Venus to be found on the eastern side of the Adriatic and it dates back to 1st century BC. It's unique in that approval from the emperor’s family itself was needed before building could commence for such a statue to be built. The temple is located within a shop just inside of the small gate.

In the 13th century one of the "cadet branches" of the aristocratic Italian Frangipani family settled in the city and gave rise to the Croatian family of the Frankopan. Krk was the last Croatian island to be occupied by the Venetians. Krk and surrounding area were known for large use of glagoljica. In the 19th century the city was center of the Illyrian movement.

The city was once known for its unique Romance language called Vegliotic (one of the two main branches of the extinct Dalmatian language), which was spoken until the early 19th century. There was a large Italian community in the city, but Italy eventually gave up the island in favor of Yugoslavia in 1921 (when the city was officially called Krk for the first time), and many of its Italian-speaking residents subsequently left for Istria and Italy.

The city was temporarily occupied by D'Annunzio in 1921 and twenty years later was integrated into the Italian Province of Fiume between 1941 and 1943. Yugoslav Partisans liberated the city in 1944.

The last two days of November 2008, record wave heights were recorded in the Kvarner Gulf. Little rain fell, but the town of Krk was flooded anyway thanks to a strong sirocco wind.

== Climate ==
Since records began in 1981, the highest temperature recorded at the local weather station was 38.8 °C (101.8 °F), on 21 July 2015. The coldest temperature was −9.0 °C (15.8 °F), on 24 January 2006.

== Demographics ==
Historical population
Year	Pop.	±%
1857	3,118	—
1869	3,427	+9.9%
1880	3,531	+3.0%
1890	3,874	+9.7%
1900	3,902	+0.7%
1910	4,173	+6.9%
1921	3,937	−5.7%
1931	4,184	+6.3%
1948	4,104	−1.9%
1953	4,045	−1.4%
1961	3,633	−10.2%
1971	3,586	−1.3%
1981	3,982	+11.0%
1991	4,997	+25.5%
2001	5,491	+9.9%
2011	6,281	+14.4%
2021	6,816	+8.5%
Source: Naselja i stanovništvo Republike Hrvatske 1857–2021, DZS

Town of Krk: Population trends 1857–2021
v

population	3118	3427	3531	3874	3902	4173	3937	4184	4104	4045	3633	3586	3982	4997	5491	6281	6816
	1857	1869	1880	1890	1900	1910	1921	1931	1948	1953	1961	1971	1981	1991	2001	2011	2021

Sources: Croatian Bureau of Statistics publications

According to the Austrian censuses, there were 1,541 residents of the central settlement that used Italian as their habitual language (97% of the total population) in 1880, and 1,494 (84%) in 1910. The commune as a whole had 1,635 (24%) Italian speakers in 1880, and 1494 (68%) in 1910. In 2011, only 33 people declared themselves as Dalmatian Italians, corresponding to 0.53% of the total population.

== Settlements ==
Administratively, the town of Krk comprises 15 settlements. Each of them is listed below, with their respective population as of 2021.

- Bajčići, population 123
- Brusići, population 43
- Brzac, population 174
- Kornić, population 500
- Krk, population 3935
- Lakmartin, population 32
- Linardići, population 151
- Milohnići, population 102
- Muraj, population 69
- Nenadići, population 164
- Pinezići, population 258
- Poljica, population 83
- Skrbčići, population 173
- Vrh, population 939
- Žgaljići, population 70

== Governance ==
It is the seat of its own local committee.

== Monuments and sights ==
=== Krk Cathedral of the Assumption of Mary ===
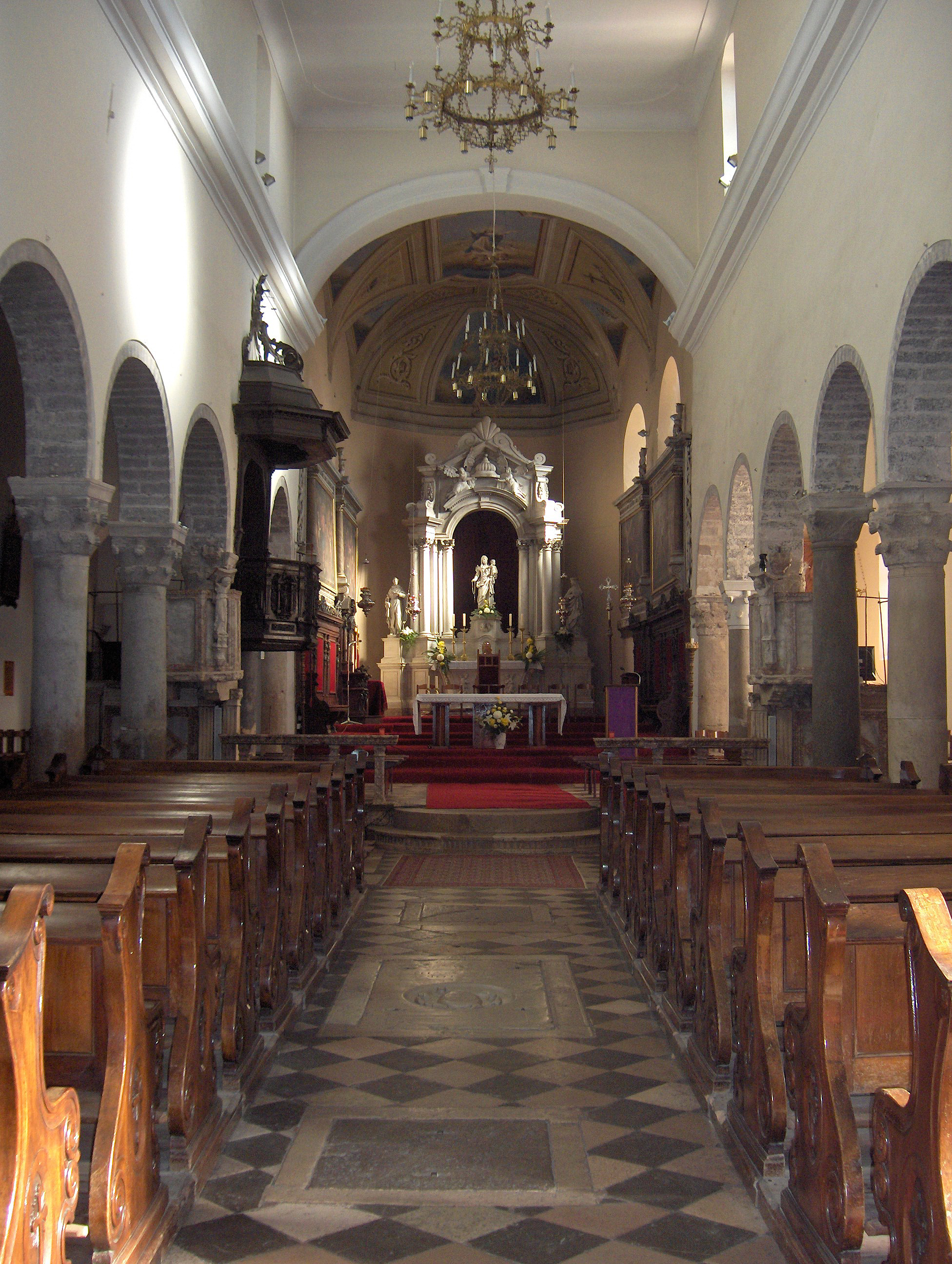
Unutrašnjost katedrale

The Krk Cathedral dominates the view of the city of Krk, it was built on an elevated part that dominates the entire bay. Next to the cathedral there are several sacred buildings, the most famous of which is the double church of St. Quirin and St. Margaret. During the archaeological excavations carried out between 1956 and 1963, Roman baths from the 1st century were discovered along the northern wall of the cathedral, a floor mosaic was unearthed and preserved in the cistern, the other parts are still covered with earth. According to some sources, already in the 3rd or 4th century, part of the thermal baths was converted into a church, and at the end of the 5th century, an early Christian basilica was built, on the foundations of which the present cathedral was built. In accordance with the customs of the time, the baptistery was built next to the church in the area of one of the spa pools, as a special facility, which was used until 1565 . Later, the baptistery was attached to the church area, and it was discovered for excavations in 1966, when a plaque with the inscription: Piscina antiqui baptisterii was discovered.

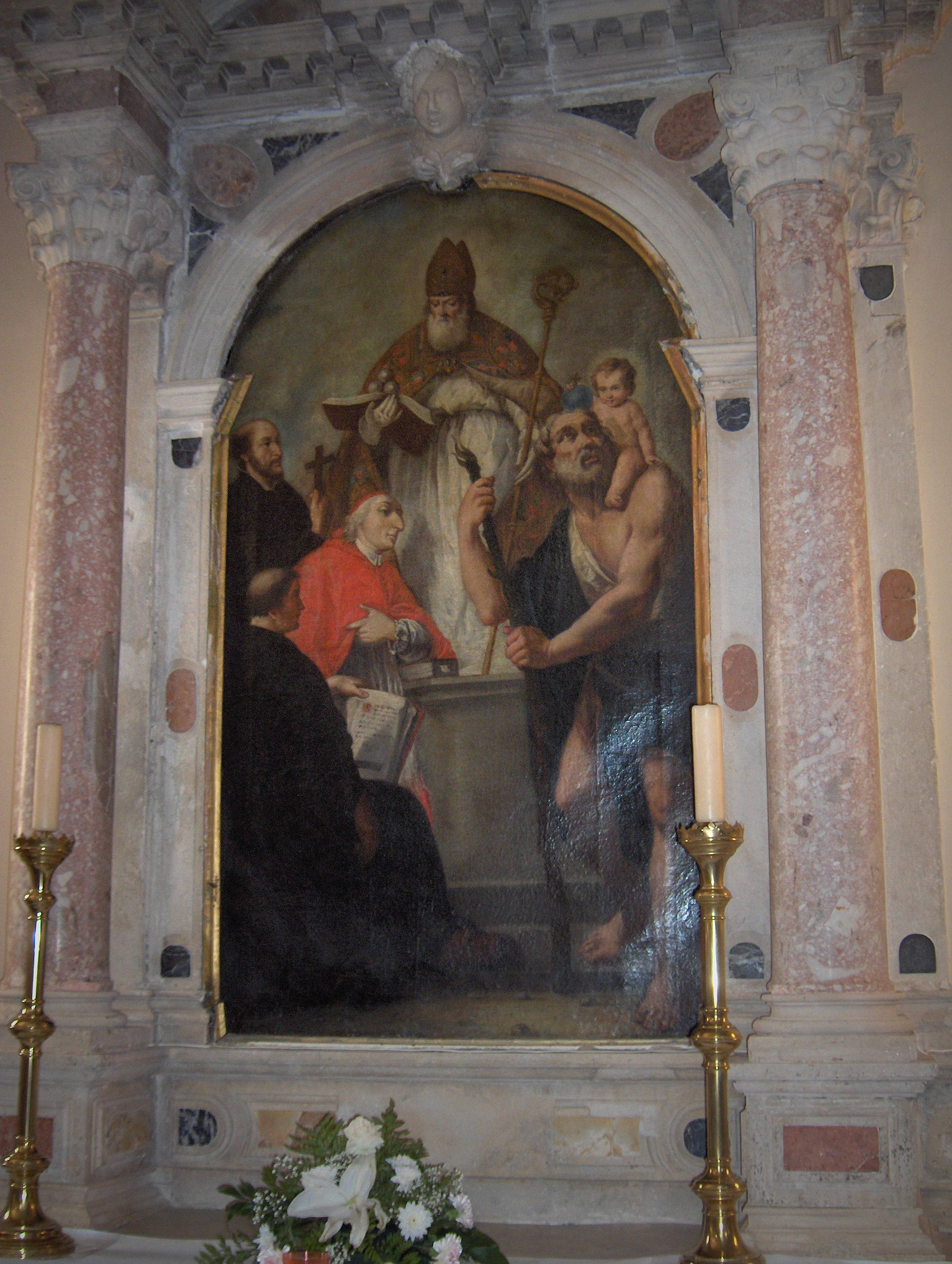
Oltarna slika

The cathedral owes its present appearance to the Romanesque style, as it was built mostly in the 11th and 12th centuries . The cathedral has fourteen columns, twelve of them have Corinthian capitals, while one capital in the southern row is classical, and one (first to the altar) in the northern row is early Christian. Over the centuries, numerous chapels with altars were built along the side walls of the church. Around 1450, John VII. Frankopan had the chapel of St. built in the Gothic style. Barbare, on the ceiling of which are the coats of arms of the Frankopan family . In 1500, two expensive Renaissance pulpits were made according to the design of the local craftsman Franja. In 1538, the apse was extended, and in 1700, the space for the organ and choir was arranged.

=== Lapidarium Volsonis ===
Volsonis is an archaeological site that reveals more than two thousand years of history of the city of Krk. It got its name from the tombstone of the Roman decurion Volson (city senator, one of the leading officials in the city administration), which was found during the excavation of the site. In the archeological site of Volsonis, four ramparts of the city of Krk have been preserved: ancient, late-antique, medieval and renaissance, which shows the process of the gradual expansion of the city of Krk over the centuries. Of the more important archaeological finds, two large and well-preserved Venus altars stand out, which are currently the only ones on the eastern coast of the Adriatic, from Greece to Italy. Among the more important archaeological finds is the late-antique rampart, which was built from the remains of the Krk Venus temple - demolished in a panic to protect themselves from the onslaught of barbarians from northern and eastern Europe. Several Greek megaliths were also found, huge stone blocks that were used exclusively in the construction of city walls in ancient Greece, which indicates that the city of Krk was a Greek city before the arrival of the Romans.

== Culture ==
- City of Krk culture centre (Centar za kulturu Grada Krka), founded in 1995
- City library Krk (Gradska knjižnica Krk), founded in 1990
- International summer school of Croatian language and culture, organised by Faculty of Croatian Studies

== Gallery ==
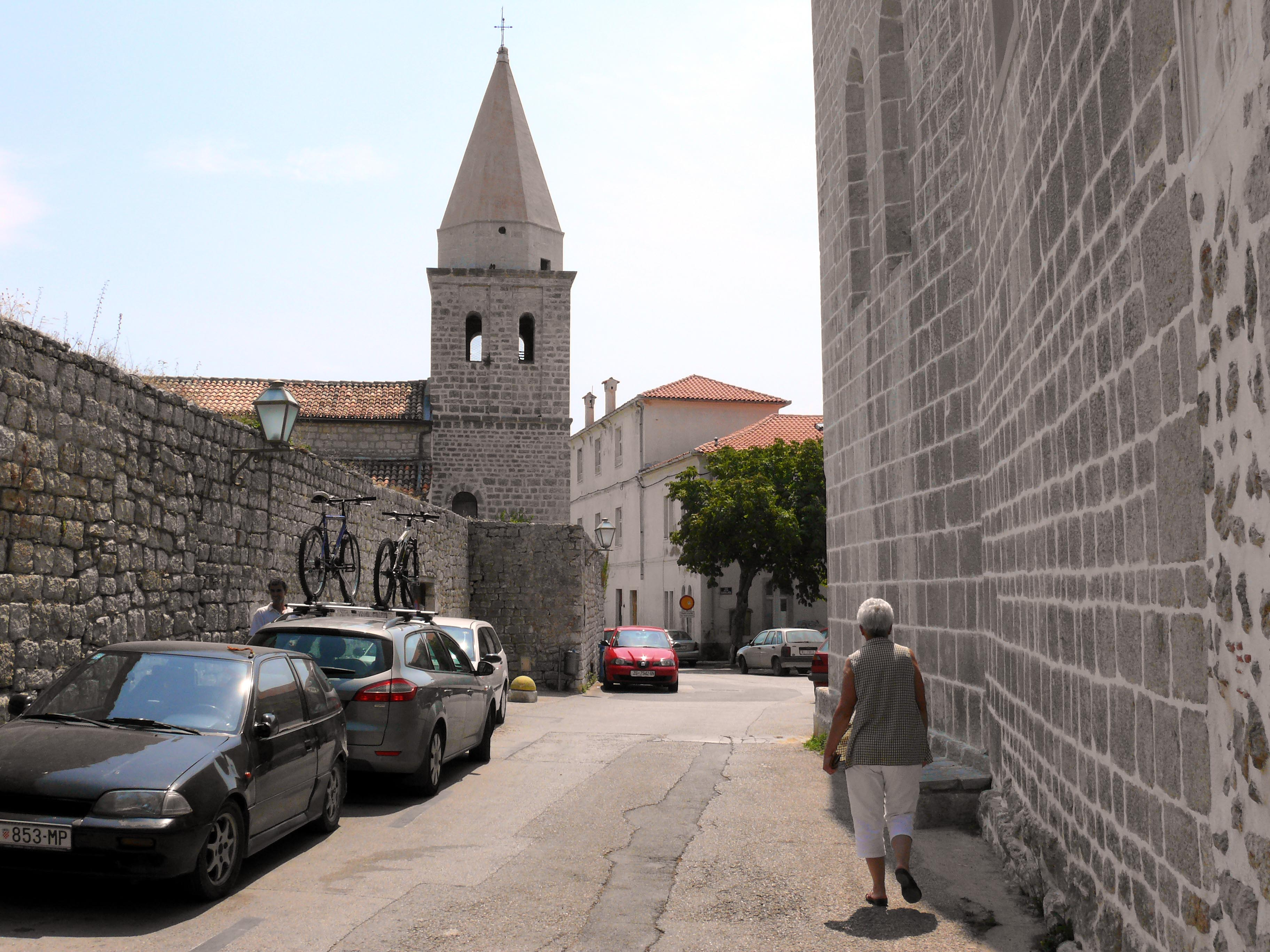
Krk Old Town

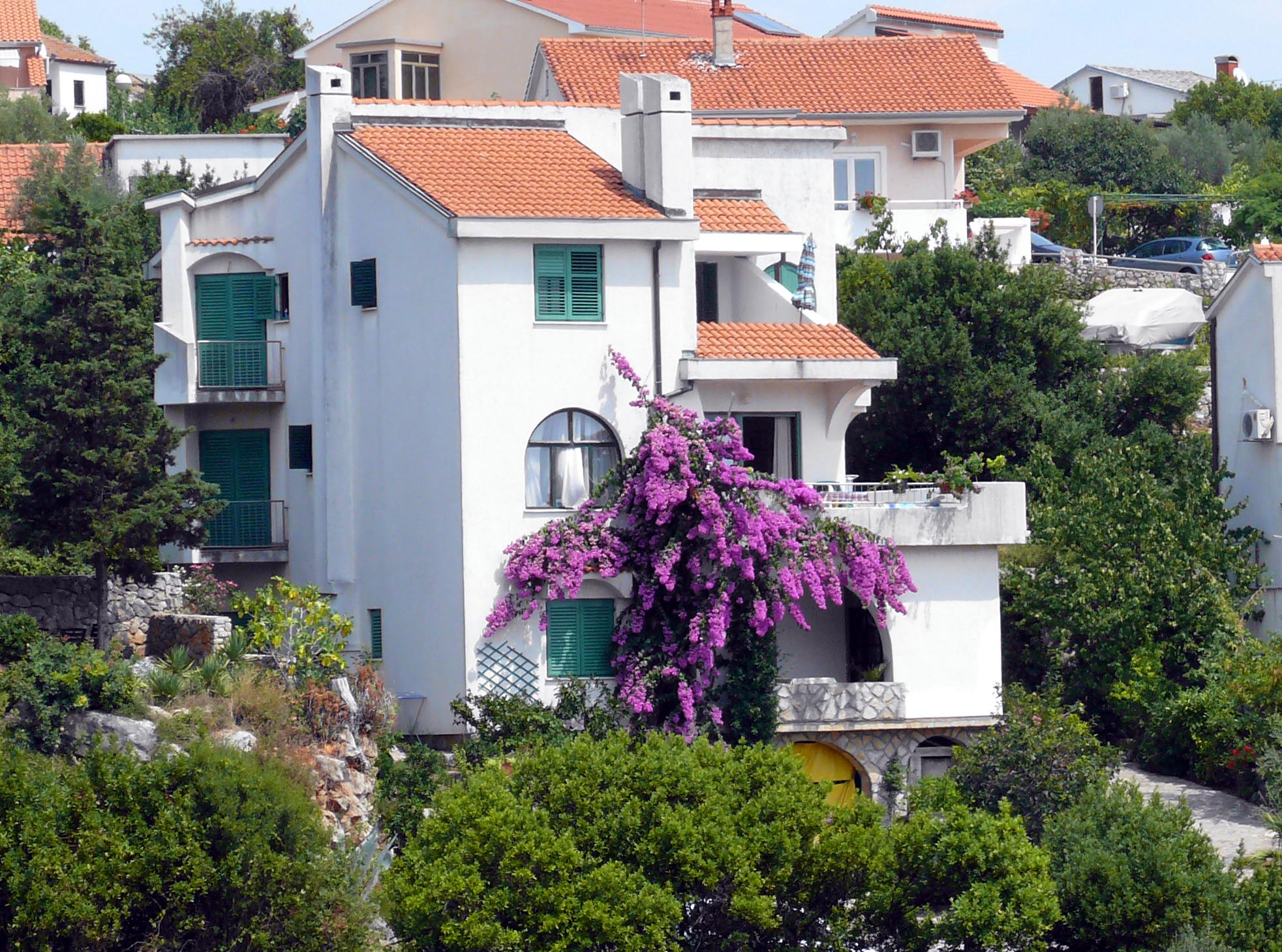
Houses in Krk

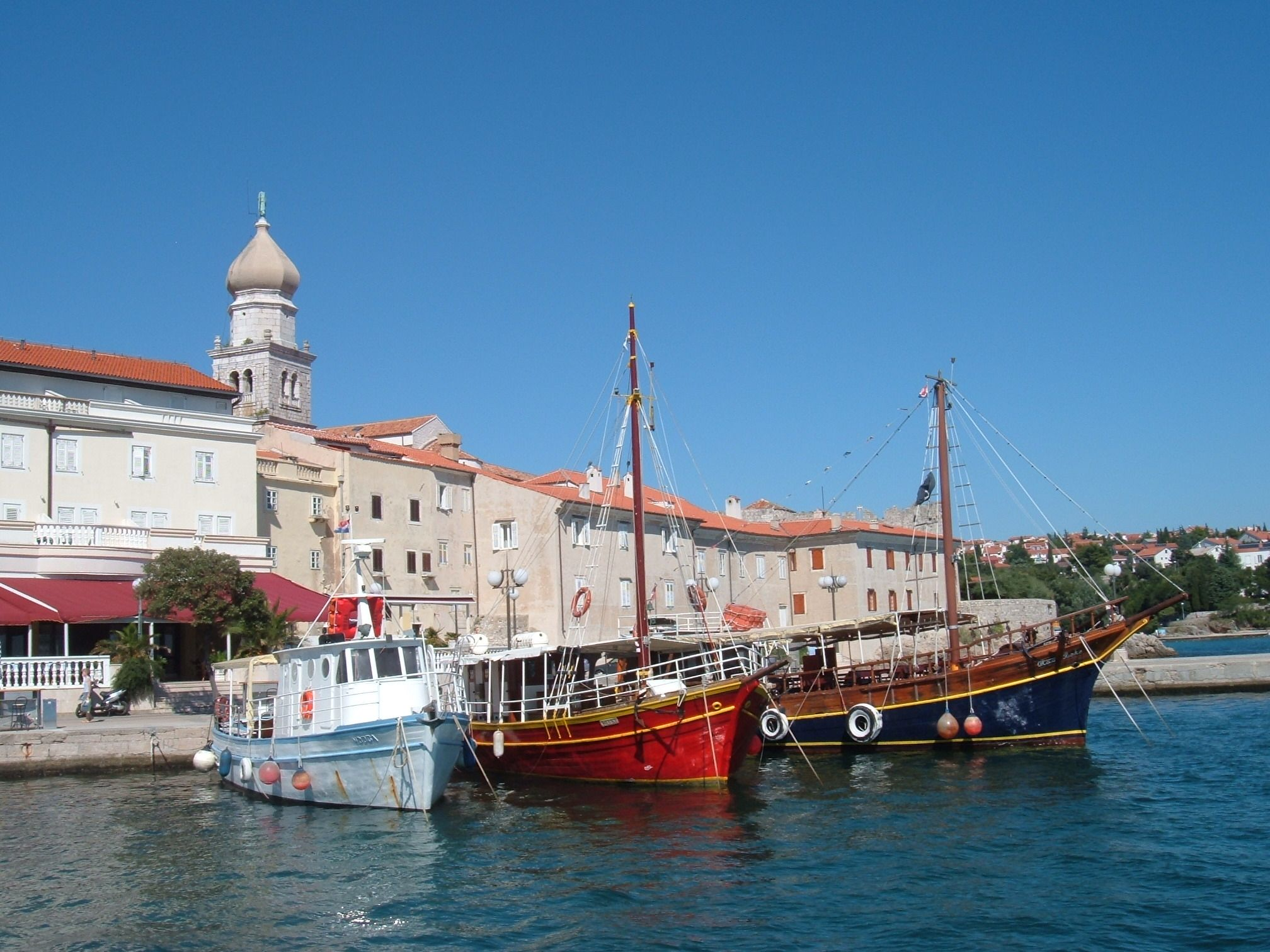
Boats at the port

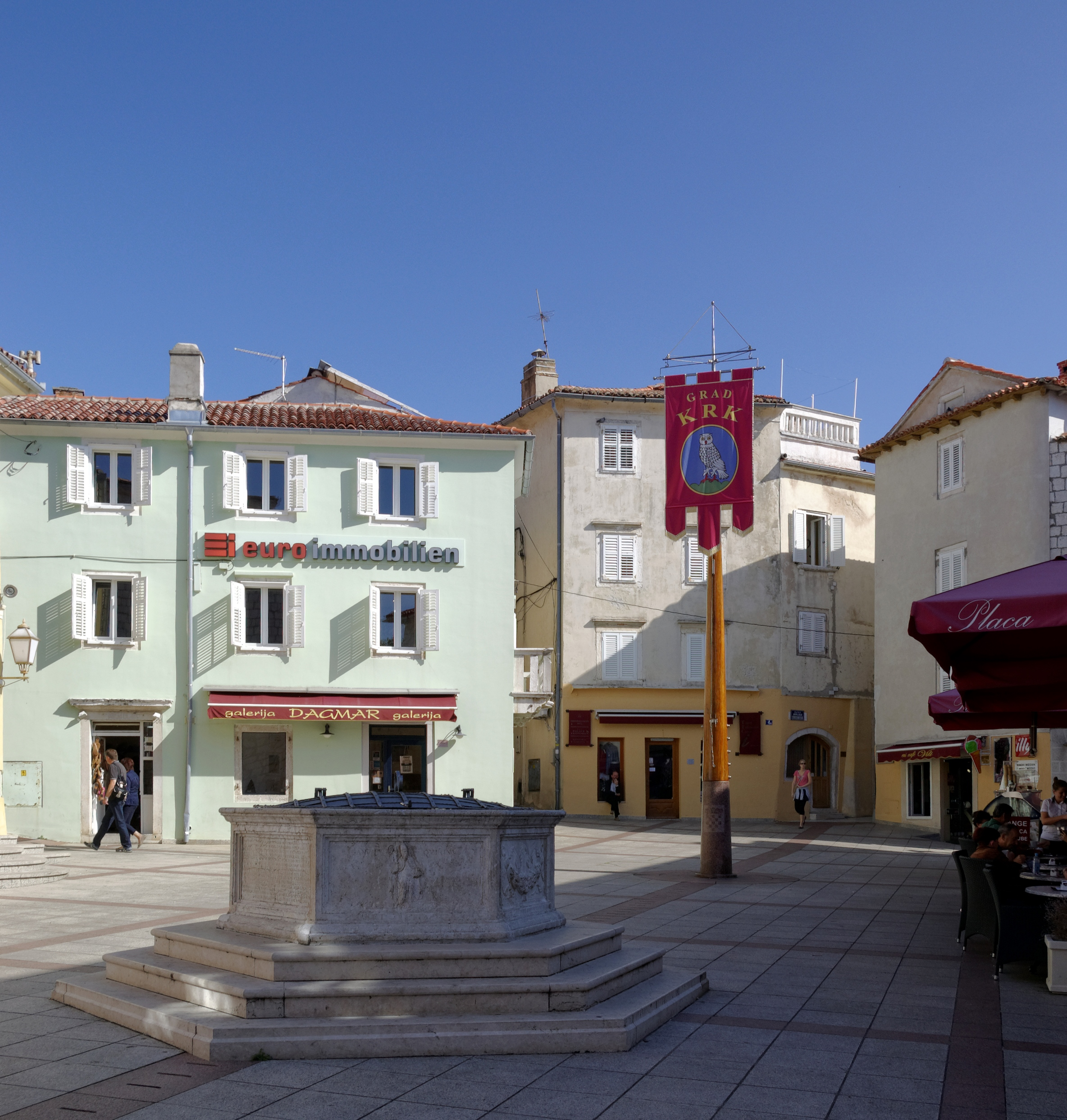
Town marketplace

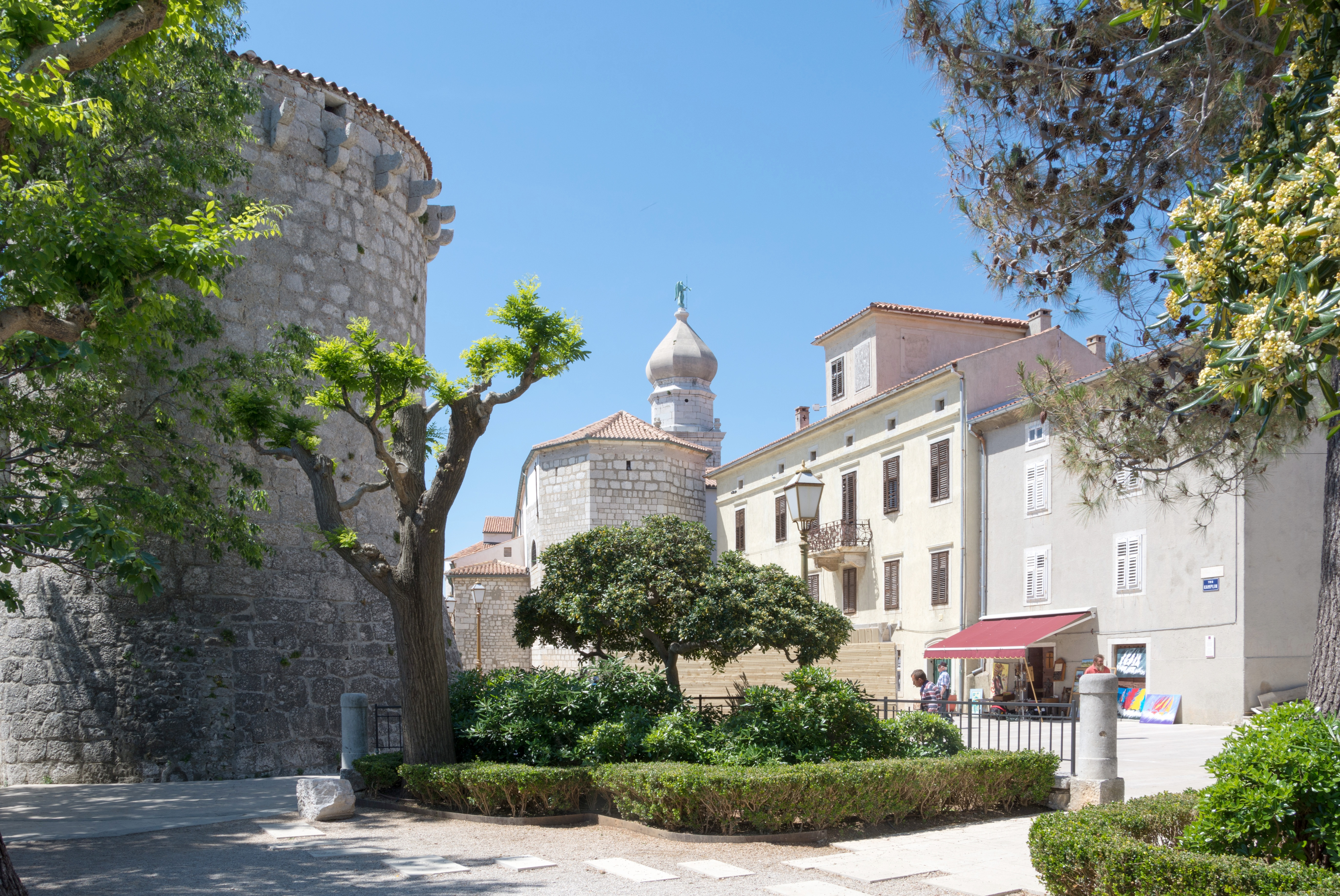
Kamplin Square

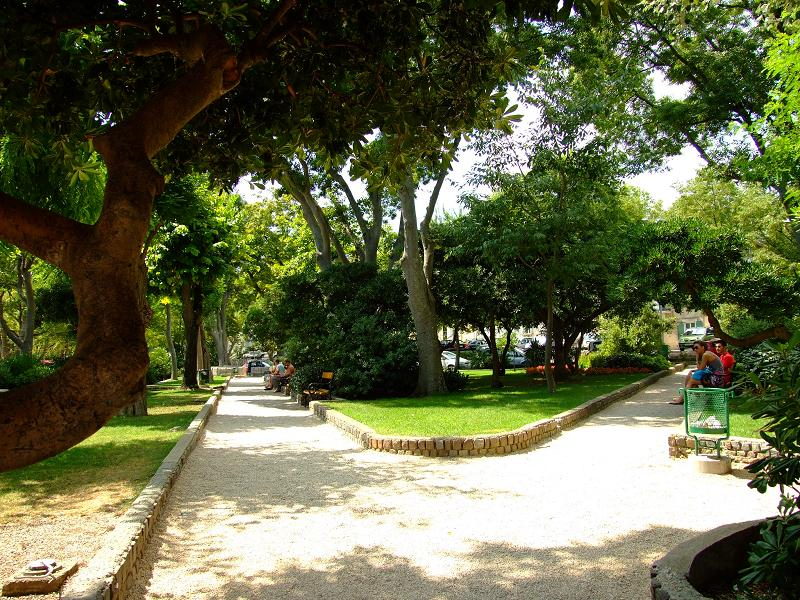
Town Park

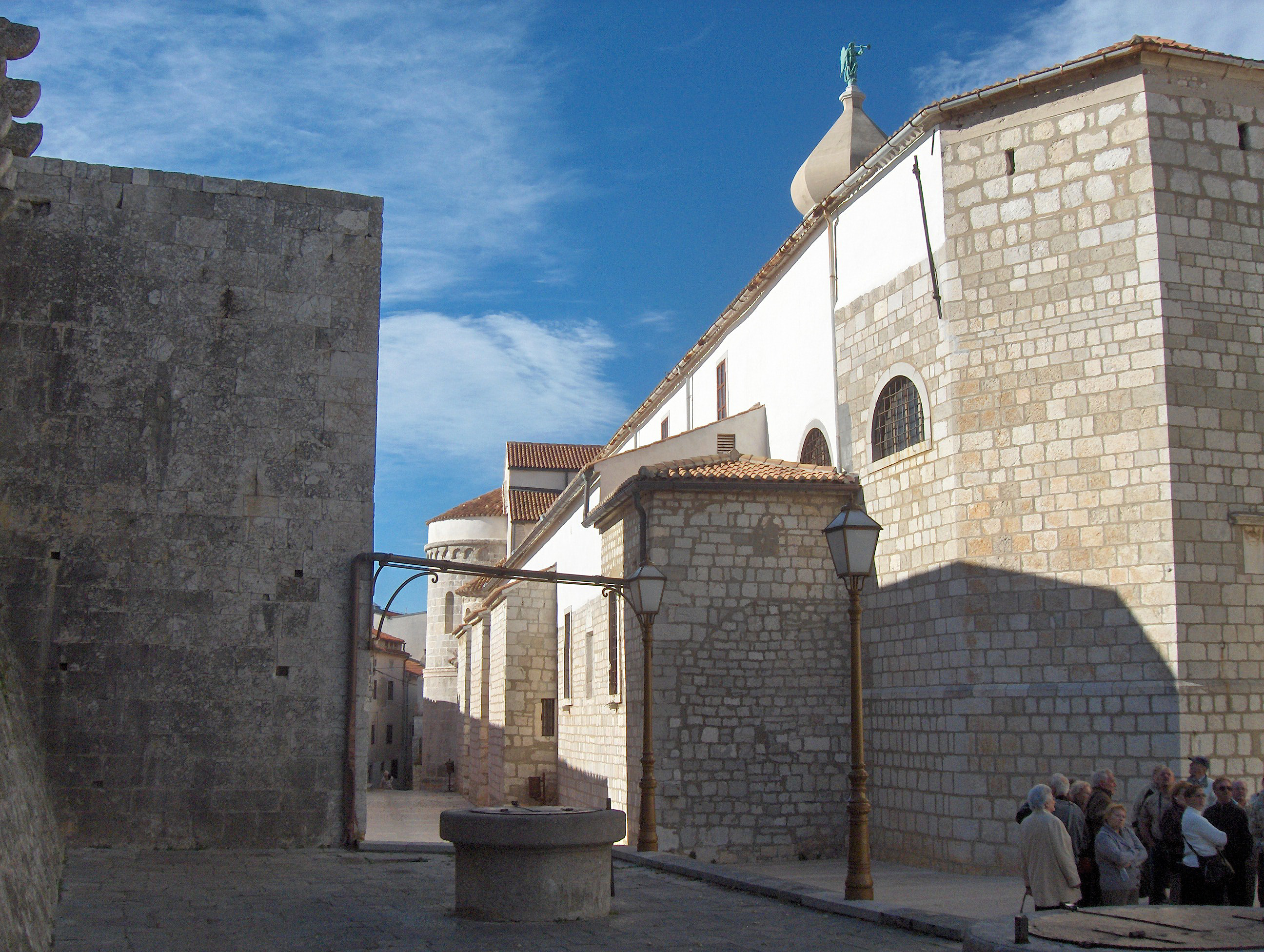
Church of the Assumption

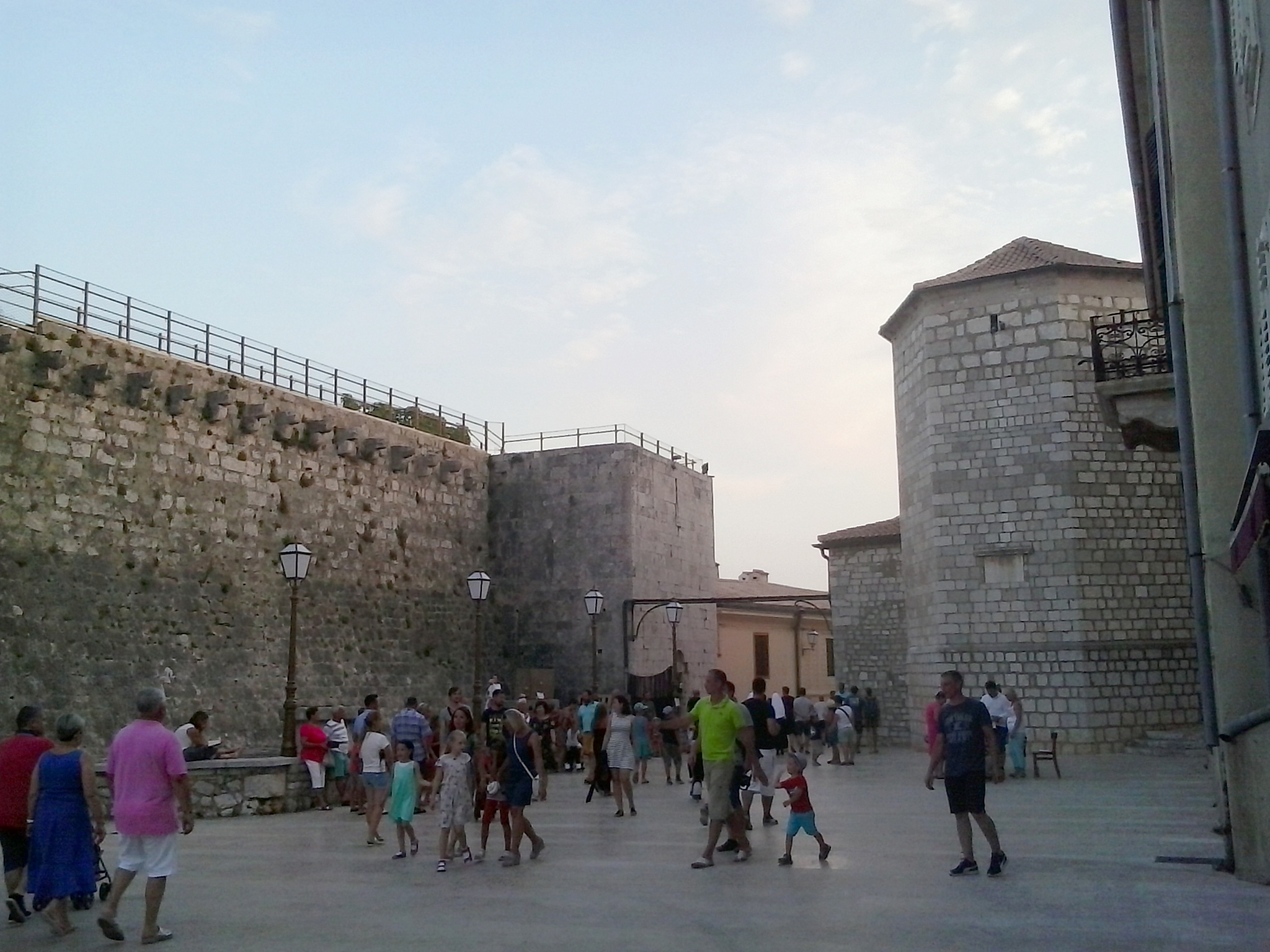
Kamplin Square during a tourist season
