= Malinska =

Coordinates: 45°08′N 14°32′E

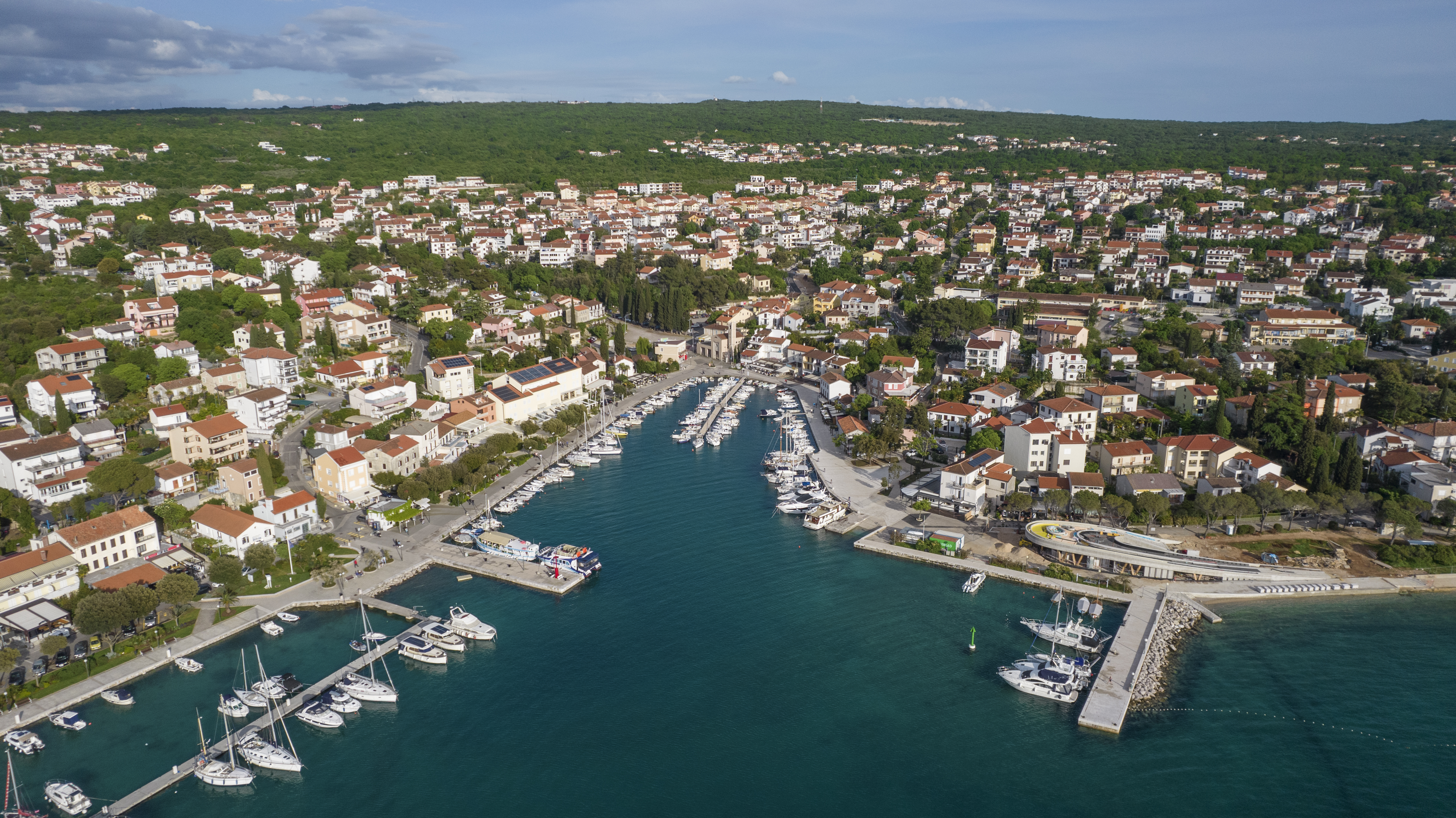
- Malinska
- Interactive map of Malinska
- Country: Croatia
- County: Primorje-Gorski Kotar County
- Municipality: Malinska-Dubašnica

Area
  - Total: 2.4 km^{2} (0.93 sq mi)

Population (2021)
  - Total: 816
  - Density: 340/km^{2} (880/sq mi)
- Time zone: UTC+1 (CET)
  - Summer (DST): UTC+2 (CEST)
- Postal code: 51511 Malinska
- Area code: 051
- Vehicle registration: RI
- Website: www.tz-malinska.hr

Malinska (German: Durischal) is a settlement (naselje) in the northwestern part of the island Krk in Croatia and an important tourist town. It lies on the coast of the Adriatic Sea, in the picturesque bay facing Opatija and Rijeka.

== Demographics ==
The municipality of Malinska-Dubašnica has 3,212 inhabitants and the settlement itself has 816 as of the 2021 census. During the 1990s, the catastrophic consequences of the privatization of the "Haludovo" hotel complex, the main entity in Malinska, almost completely destroyed the resort and led to the loss of at least 150 jobs. The impacted was reflected in the population of Malinska, which decreased by one third.

Historical population

Year	Pop.	±%
1857	103	—
1869	113	+9.7%
1880	142	+25.7%
1890	173	+21.8%
1900	204	+17.9%
1910	222	+8.8%
1921	248	+11.7%
1931	315	+27.0%
1948	290	−7.9%

Year	Pop.	±%
1953	319	+10.0%
1961	326	+2.2%
1971	392	+20.2%
1981	700	+78.6%
1991	999	+42.7%
2001	607	−39.2%
2011	965	+59.0%
2021	816	−15.4%

Source: DZS

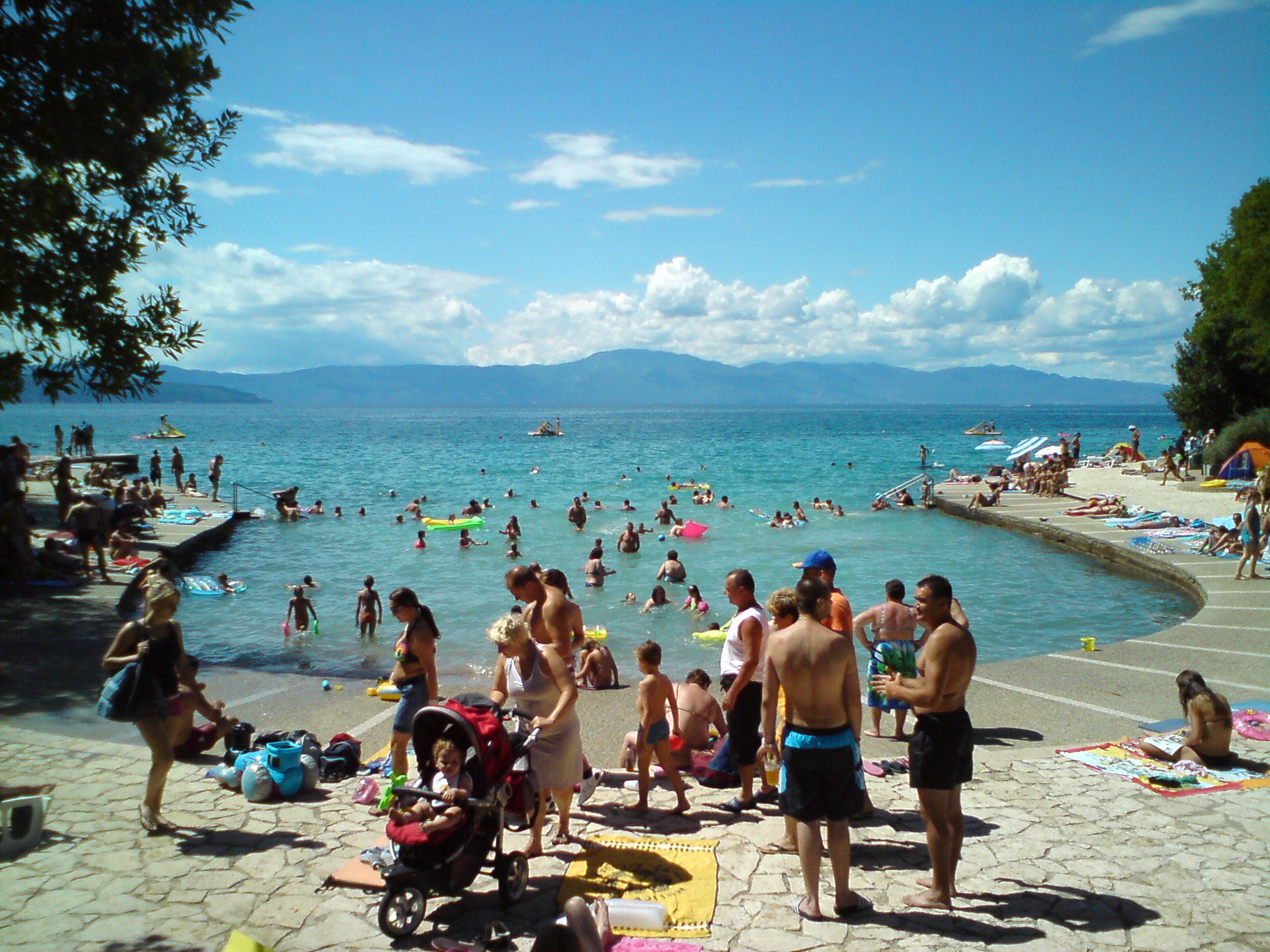
Beach Haludovo in Malinska.

== Geography ==
The settlement of Malinska is about 15 minutes from the Rijeka airport and can also be reached by car from the mainland crossing the Krk bridge. The city of Krk is located 12 km to the south.

Malinska harbor was used as a port due to its protection from bura wind as well as its depth.

== Climate ==
From 1981 to 2009, the highest temperature recorded at the local weather station was 38.2 °C (100.8 °F), on 23 July 2003. The coldest temperature was −9.0 °C (15.8 °F), on 24 January 2006.

== Culture ==
Every year, on July 23 the traditional "Malinskarska Night" takes place (Croatian: Malinskarska noć) — the day of the municipality and the feast of Saint Apollinaris, patron saint of the parish and settlement.

The parish church of St. Apollinaris is located in the vicinity - Bogovići. Built in the 19th century, it dominates Malinska. The new chapel of St. Nicholas in the center of the port was consecrated in 2000.

== See also ==
- Dubašnica
