= Baška tablet =

11th-century Croatian inscription

- Bašćanska ploča Baščanska ploča
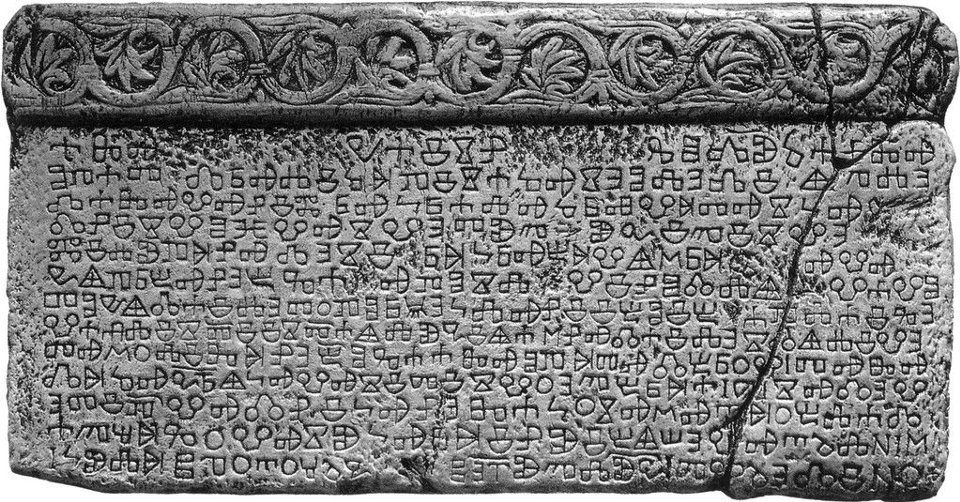
- Material: Limestone
- Length: 199 cm (78 in)
- Height: 99.5 cm (39.2 in)
- Weight: c. 800 kg (1,800 lb)
- Created: late 11th – early 12th century (c. 1100)
- Discovered: 1851; Church of St. Lucy, Jurandvor near Baška, Krk
- Discovered by: Petar Dorčić
- Present location: Croatian Academy of Sciences and Arts, Zagreb

Baška tablet (Croatian: Bašćanska ploča, pronounced [bâʃt͡ɕanskaː plɔ̂t͡ʃa]) is one of the first monuments containing an inscription in the Croatian recension of Church Slavonic, dating from c. 1100 AD. On it the Croatian ethnonym and King Demetrius Zvonimir are mentioned for the first time in its native form. The inscription is written in the Glagolitic script. It was discovered in 1851 at Church of St. Lucy in Jurandvor near the village of Baška on the Croatian island of Krk.

== History ==
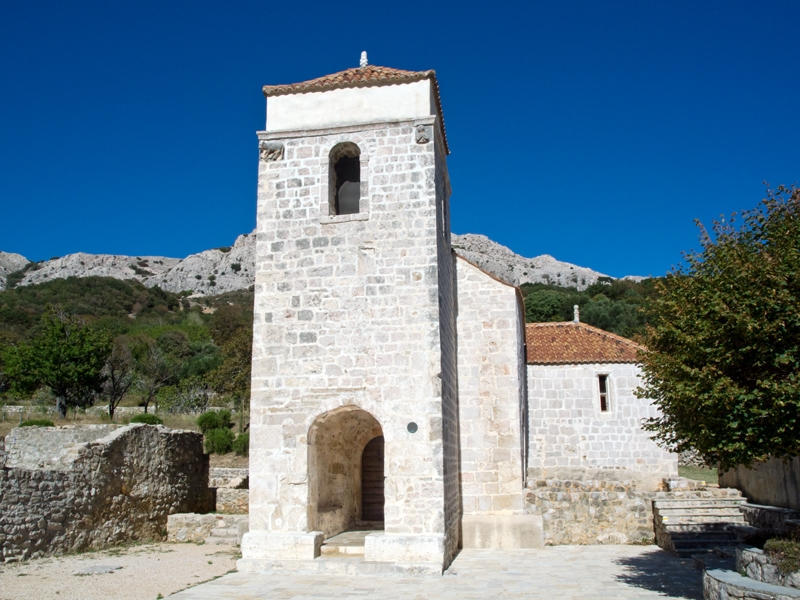
The Church of St. Lucy, Jurandvor.

The tablet was discovered on 15 September 1851 by Petar Dorčić during paving of the Church of St. Lucy in Jurandvor near the village of Baška on the island of Krk. Already then a small part of it was broken.

Since 1934, the original tablet has been kept at the Croatian Academy of Sciences and Arts, Zagreb. Croatian archaeologist Branko Fučić contributed to the interpretation of Baška tablet as a left altar partition. His reconstruction of the text of the Baška tablet is the most widely accepted version today.

== Description ==
The Baška tablet is made of white limestone. It is 199 cm wide, 99.5 cm high, and 7.5–9 cm thick. It weighs approximately 800 kilograms. The tablet was installed as a partition between the altar and the rest of the church, specifically, it was left pluteus of the cancellus/septum (the right pluteus tablet is so-called "Jurandvorski ulomci/Jurandvor fragments" with four preserved pieces which were also found on the pavement, mentions name of Zvonimir, Croatia, Lucia, word "opat", "prosih" and "križ", has almost the same but smaller letters and it is also dated to the 11th and 12th century). According to historical sources the cancellus was preserved until 1751. It is believed it was destroyed sometimes between then and 1851. When destroyed, the tablet was placed on the pavement of the church. A replica is in place in the church.

The inscribed stone slab records King Zvonimir's donation of a piece of land to a Benedictine abbey in the time of abbot Držiha. The second half of the inscription tells how abbot Dobrovit built the church along with nine monks. The inscription is written in the Glagolitic script, exhibiting features of Church Slavonic of Croatian recension influenced by Chakavian dialect of Croatian language, such as writing (j)u for (j)ǫ, e for ę, i for y, and using one jer only (ъ). It also has several Latin and Cyrillic letters (i, m, n, o, t, v) which combination was still common for that period. It provides the only example of transition from Glagolitic of the rounded Bulgarian (old Slovak) type to the angular Croatian alphabet type.

=== Contents ===
Speech example
An example of Old Croatian used in Baška tablet

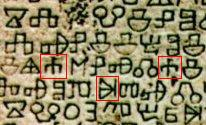
Detail of Baška tablet.

The scholars who took part in deciphering of the Glagolitic text dealt with palaeographic challenges, as well as the problem of the damaged, worn-out surface of the slab. Through successive efforts, the contents were mostly interpreted before World War I, but remained a topic of study throughout the 20th century.

One of the most disputed parts of it is the mention of "Mikula/Nicholas in Otočac", considered as a reference either to the church (and later monastery) of St. Mikula/Nicholas in Otočac in Northwestern part of Lika (but earliest historical mention dating to the 15th century), or to the toponym of St. Lucia's estate of Mikulja in Punat on Krk which is an island (in Croatian island is "otok" with "Otočac" being a derivation), or somewhere else on Krk and its surroundings (like monastery of St. Nicholas near Omišalj, old churches of St. Nicholas in Bosar, Ogrul, Negrit or island of Susak). Lately, church historian Mile Bogović supported the thesis about St. Nicholas in Otočac because the Gregorian Reform during Zvonimir's reign went from Croatian inland toward recently conquered Byzantine lands (Krk was one of the Dalmatian city-states part of the theme of Dalmatia), and linguist Valentin Putanec based on the definition of krajina in the dictionary by Bartol Kašić and Giacomo Micaglia (meaning coastline and inland of Liburnia) argued it shows connection between Benedictines in Krk and Otočac in Lika.

The original text, with unreadable segments marked gray:

ⰰⰸⱏ–––––ⱌⰰⱄⰻⱀⰰ––ⱅⰰⰳⱁⰴⱆⱈⰰⰰⰸⱏ
ⱁⱂⰰⱅ–ⰴⱃⱏⰶⰻⱈⱝⱂⰻⱄⰰⱈⱏⱄⰵⱁⰾⰵⰴⰻⱑⱓⰶⰵ
ⰴⰰⰸⱏⰲⱏⱀⰻⰿⱃⱏⰽⱃⰰⰾⱏⱈⱃⱏⰲⱝⱅⱏⱄⰽⱏ–––
ⰴⱀⰻⱄⰲⱁⱗⰲⱏⱄⰲⰵⱅⱆⱓⰾⱆⱌⰻⱓⰻⱄⰲⰵ––
ⰿⰻⰶⱆⱂⱝⱀⱏⰴⰵⱄⰻ–ⱃⱝⰽⱃⱏⰱⱝⰲⱑⰿⱃⱝ–––ⱏⰲⱏ––
ⱌⱑⱂⱃⰱⱏⱀⰵⰱⰳⰰ–ⱏⱂⱁⱄⰾ–ⰲⰻⱀⱁⰴⰾⱑ––ⰲⰰⰲⱁ
ⱅⱁⱌⱑⰴⰰⰻⰶⰵⱅⱉⱂⱁⱃⱒⰵⰽⰾⱏⱀⰻⰻⰱⱁⰻⰱ–ⰰⱂⰾⰰⰻⰳⰵ
ⰲⰰⰼⰾⰻⱄⱅ҃ⰻⰻⱄⱅ҃ⰰⱑⰾⱆⱌⰻⱑⰰⱞⱀⱏⰴⰰⰻⰾⰵⱄⰴⱑⰶⰻⰲⰵ
ⱅⱏⱞⱉⰾⰻⰸⱝⱀⰵⰱ҃ⱁⰳⰰⰰⰸⱏⱁⱂⱝⱅⱏⰴⰱⱃⱉⰲⱜⱅⱏⰸⱏ
ⰴⱝⱈⱏⱌⱃ꙯ⱑⰽⱏⰲⱏⱄⰻⱅⰻⱄⰲⱉⰵⱓⰱⱃⱝⰰⱜⱓⱄⱏⰴⰵⰲ
ⰵⱅⰻⱓⰲⱏⰴⱀⰻⰽⱏⱀⰵⰸⰰⰽⱉⱄⱏⱞⱏⱅⱝⱉⰱⰾⰰⰴ
ⰰⱓⱋⱝⰳⱉⰲⱏⱄⱆⰽⱏⱃⱝⰻⱀⱆⰻⰱⱑⱎⰵⰲⱏⱅⱏⰾNⱜⱞ
ⱜⰽⱆⰾⱝⰲⱏⱉтⱉⱒⱍ–––ⰲⰵт꙯ⱆⱓⰾⱆⱌ꙯ⱜⱓⰲⱏⰵⰴⰻNⱉ

The transliterated text according to Branko Fučić (1960s, last update 1982–1985), with restored segments in square brackets, is as follows:

Original text transliterated to Latin	The same text in modern Croatian	The same text in English
a[zъ vъ ime o]tca i s(i)na [i s](ve)tago duha azъ opat[ъ] držiha pisahъ se o ledi[n]ě juže da zъvъnimirъ kralъ hrъvatъskъï [vъ] dni svoję vъ svetuju luciju i sv[edo]- mi županъ desim(i)ra krъ[ba]vě mra[tin]ъ vъ l(i)- cě pr(i)bъnebža [s]ъ posl[ъ] vin[od](o)lě [ěk](o)vъ v(ъ) o- tocě da iže to poreče klъni i bo(g) i bï(=12) ap(osto)la i g(=4) e- van(je)listi i s(ve)taě luciě am(e)nъ da iže sdě žive- tъ moli za ne boga azъ opatъ d(o)brovitъ zъ- dah crěkъvъ siju i svoeju bratiju sъ dev- etiju vъdni kъneza kosъmъta oblad- ajućago vъsu kъrainu i běše vъ tъ dni m- ikula vъ točъci [sъ s]vetuju luciju vъ edino	Ja, u ime Oca i Sina i Svetoga Duha. Ja opat Držiha pisah ovo/to o ledini koju dade Zvonimir, kralj hrvatski, u svoje dane svetoj Luciji, i svjedoci župan Desimir u Krbavi, Martin u Lici, Piribineg posal u Vinodolu i Jakov na otoku. Da tko to poreče, prokleo ga Bog i 12 apostola i 4 evanđelista i sveta Lucija. Amen. Da tko ovdje živi, moli za njih Boga. Ja opat Dobrovit zidah crkvu ovu sa svoje devetero braće u dane kneza Kosmata koji je vladao cijelom Krajinom. I bješe u te dane Mikula u Otočcu sa svetom Lucijom zajedno	I, in the name of the Father and the Son and the Holy Spirit. I, the Abbot Držiha, wrote this about the land which Zvonimir, King of the Croats, gave in His days to Saint Lucia, witnessed by the Župan Desimir of Krbava, Martin of Lika, Piribineg the Deputy of Vinodol, and Jakob of the Island. May any who deny this be cursed by God and the Twelve Apostles and the Four Evangelists and Saint Lucia. Amen. May any who live here pray to God for them. I, the Abbot Dobrovit, built this church with nine of my brethren in the days of Knez Kosmat who ruled over the entire Krajina. And in those days Nicholas of Otočac was with Saint Lucia.

== Dating ==
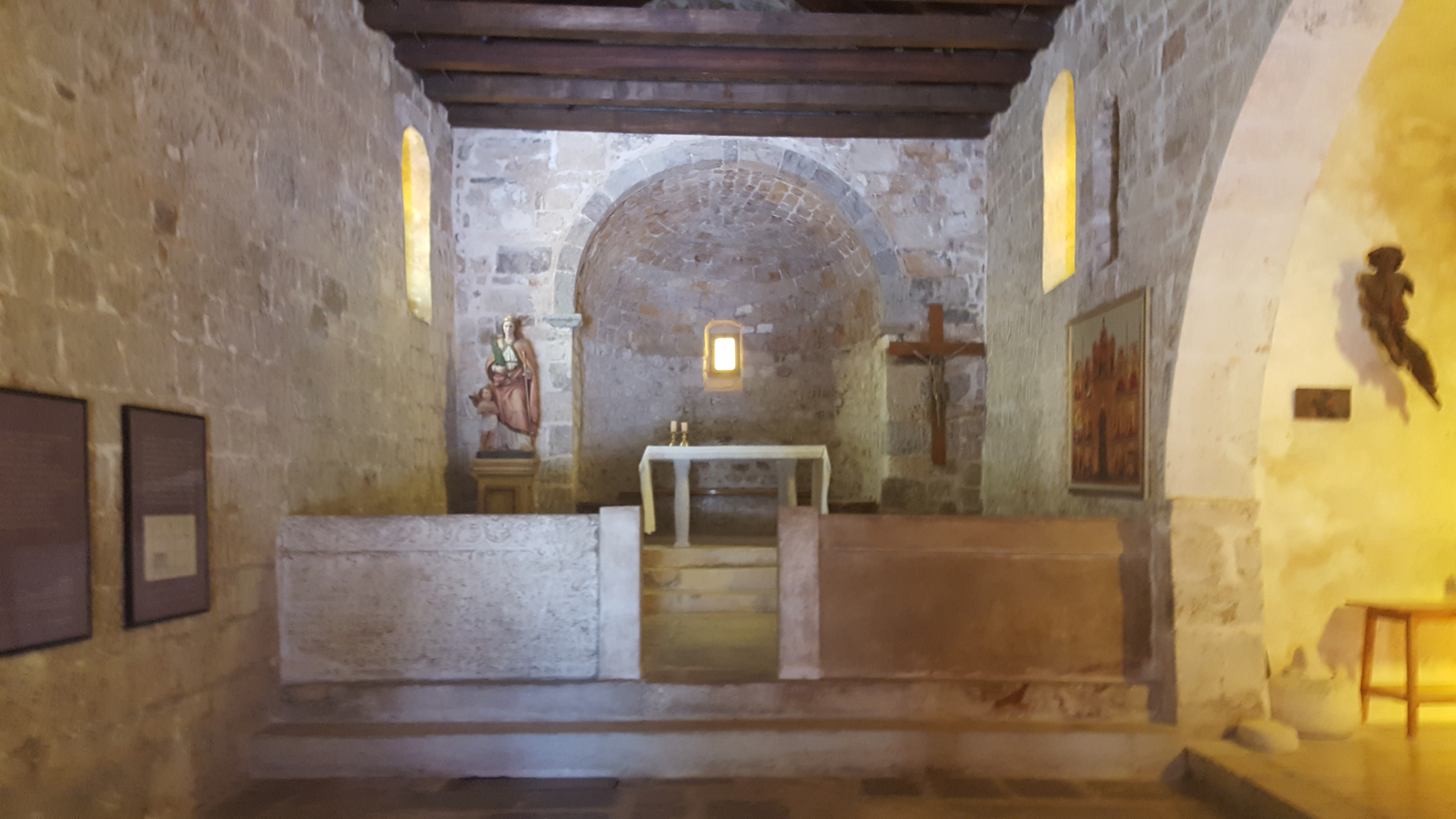
Baška tablet replica with partially reconstructed cancellus in St. Lucy's church

Evidence points to the tablet dating to the late 11th or early 12th century (c. 1100 CE). The Abbot Držiha noting King Zvonimir's donation as a past event ("in His days") suggests it was inscribed after the King's death (1089). The reference to the Church of Saint Lucia having been built during the reign of "Knez Kosmat who ruled over the entire Krajina" points to the period of the Croatian succession crisis of the 1090s, predating Venetian rule (1116), as well as the first mention of the Counts of Krk in 1118–1130 (later known as the Frankopan family). Here Knez (or Count) "Kosmat" can be identified with the known Župan of Lika from around 1070, or possibly the "Kuzma" mentioned as part of the entourage of King Coloman during his visit to Zadar in 1102, whereas "the Krajina" (literally "the frontier" or "march") is probably a reference to a local area on Krk island itself, or possibly the frontier with Dalmatia of the 1060s (at that time this frontier consisted of a part of the Kvarner Gulf coast, and the eastern coast of Istria). "Desimir" is identified with the Župan Desimir of Krbava mentioned in the 1078 Charter of King Zvonimir, while "Pribineg" is identified by some scholars with Pirvaneg, the Župan of Lika in 1059. The ornamental decoration of the tablet, and early Romanesque (11–12th century) features of the Church of Saint Lucia, similar to three other churches established by 1100 on the island, also point to the turn of the 12th century. Lujo Margetić considered that the Church of Saint Lucia was built between 1105 and 1118 by the aforementioned Counts of Krk (the future Frankopan line). More recently, art historian Pavuša Vežić argued that the church dates to the late Romanesque period (early 14th century), the text to c. 1300, with only the ornamental decoration dating back to c. 1100. Although this revised dating of the construction of the surviving church structure was accepted by Margetić, scholars generally do not accept the dating of the tablet to a point later than the early 12th century, describing the archaic linguistic and orthographic features of the text as "hardly possible" for an inscription originating even towards the middle 12th century, and "unimaginable" for one from the early 14th.

Scholars argue that the textual background for the inscription was made in the period between abbot Držiha and Dobrovit, probably based on the church's cartulary. It is considered that the fact it was inscribed at once as one unit (scriptura continua) rejects the thesis different rows were inscribed in two, three or four different periods as argued by Franjo Rački (two, 1078 and 1092–1102), Rudolf Strohal (four, between 1076 and 1120), Ferdo Šišić (two, until 1100), Vjekoslav Štefanić (three, between 1089 and 1116), Josip Hamm (three, 1077/1079, end of the 11th century and around 1100), Leo Košuta (three, similar to Hamm).

The meaning of the opening lines is contested. While some scholars interpret the introductory characters simply as Azъ ("I"), others believe that letters were also used to encode the year. There is no agreement, however, on the interpretation: 1100, 1077, 1079, 1105 and 1120 have been proposed.

== Significance ==
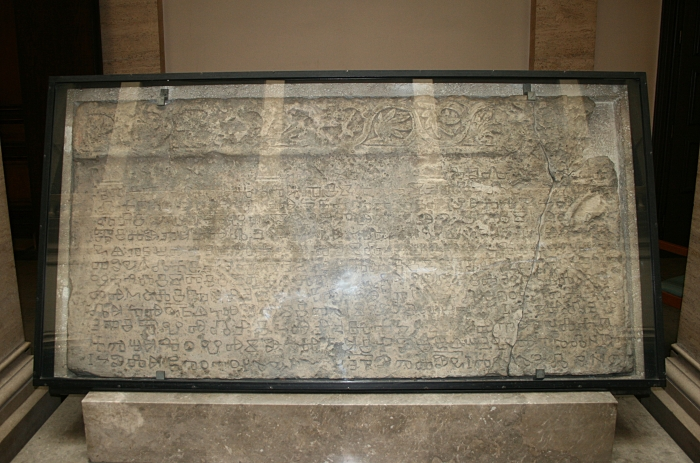
Baška tablet at HAZU in 2008.

The name of Croatia and King Zvonimir are mentioned on the tablet for the first time in Croatian.

Despite the fact of not being the oldest Croatian Glagolitic monument (the Plomin tablet, Valun tablet, Krk inscription, are older and appeared in the 11th century) and in spite of the fact that it was not written in the pure Croatian vernacular – it has nevertheless been referred to by Stjepan Ivšić as "the jewel" of Croatian, while Stjepan Damjanović called it "the baptismal certificate of Croatian culture". It features a vaguely damaged ornamental string pattern, the Croatian interlace (Croatian: troplet).

The tablet was depicted on the obverse of the Croatian 100 kuna banknote, issued in 1993 and 2002, and on a postage stamp issued by Croatian Post in 2000.

== Bibliography ==
- Fučić, Branko (September 1971). "Najstariji hrvatski glagoljski natpisi". Slovo (in Croatian). 21. Old Church Slavonic Institute: 227–254.
- Galović, Tomislav (2004). "900 godina Bašćanske ploče (1100.-2000.) – radovi sa znanstvenog skupa, ur. P. Strčić, Krčki zbornik sv. 42 – pos. izd. 36, Baška 2000., 348 str". Radovi (in Croatian). 34-35-36 (1): 307–311.
- Galović, Tomislav (2018-12-27). "Milan Moguš i Bašćanska ploča" [Milan Moguš and the Baška Tablet]. Senjski zbornik: prilozi za geografiju, etnologiju, gospodarstvo, povijest i kulturu (in Croatian). 45: 265–285. doi:10.31953/sz.45.1.3. eISSN 1849-0999.
- Margetić, Lujo (December 2007). "O nekim osnovnim problemima Bašćanske ploče" [About some general problems regarding the Baška tablet]. Croatica Christiana Periodica (in Croatian). 31 (60). Catholic Faculty of Theology, University of Zagreb: 1–15.
- Premuda, Vinko (1912). "Osvrt na djela o glagolici" [Glagolitic Collections]. Vjesnik Staroslavenske akademije u Krku (in Croatian). 1 (published 1913): 86–120. Esp. pp. 119–120.
