= Branko Fučić =

Croatian art historian (1920–1999)

- Born: 8 September 1920; Dubašnica, Kingdom of Yugoslavia
- Died: 30 January 1999 (aged 78); Rijeka, Croatia
- Education: University of Zagreb; University of Ljubljana
- Occupations: Art historian, archeologist
- Awards: Herder Prize (1985)

Branko Fučić (8 September 1920 – 30 January 1999) was a Croatian art historian, archeologist and paleographer.

He was born in Malinska-Dubašnica on the island of Krk. After graduating at the Faculty of Philosophy in Zagreb in 1944, he received his PhD in Ljubljana in 1964. He worked in various conservation institutes and institutions at the Croatian Academy of Sciences and Arts. He was an associate member of the Yugoslav Academy of Sciences and Arts since 1975, extraordinary member since 1983, and a full member of the Croatian Academy of Sciences and Arts since 1991.

He was actively engaged in field research of the medieval cultural and historical monuments, especially murals and Glagolitic epigraphy in Istria, northern Croatian Littoral and Kvarner islands. He discovered and analyzed medieval frescoes in sixty locales in Istria (Istarske freske, 1963; Vincent iz Kastva, 1992). He led archaeological excavations of the Church of St. Lucy, Jurandvor on the island of Krk, as well as the conservation effort of the complex St. Mary's in Osor. In his book Glagoljski natpisi (Glagolitic inscriptions, 1982) he collected paleographic and archaeological descriptions of all known Glagolitic inscriptions, more than 500 of them, which were created during the 11-13th century. He personally discovered more than half of them, mostly in Istria and Kvarner. He found and described the Roč Glagolitic abecedarium, Hum inscription, was the first to decode Valun tablet, Grdosel fragment, Supetar fragment, and contributed to the interpretation of Baška tablet as a left altar partition. His reconstruction of the text of the Baška tablet is the most widely accepted version today.

He died in Rijeka.

== Works ==
- "Sarkofag iz Bala" [Sarcophagus in Bale]. Peristil (in Serbo-Croatian) (29): 23–25. ISSN 0553-6707.

== Bibliography ==
- Galović, Tomislav (2019). "Branko Fučić (1920. - 1999.) i Dubašnica". O Dubašnici i njezinim ljudima: Prinosi za povijest dubašljanskoga kraja na otoku Krku [Branko Fučić (1920 - 1999) and Dubašnica] (in Serbo-Croatian). Vol. 2. pp. 483–538. ISBN 978-953-7773-96-0.
