= Shrine of Our Lady of Gorica =

Coordinates: 44°58′40″N 14°43′23″E

Shrine of Our Lady of Gorica (Croatian: Svetište Majke Božje Goričke) is a Catholic Marian shrine in Batomalj at the island of Krk in Croatia. It is the oldest shrine in the Diocese of Krk.

First church originates from the 11th century and was located in the area of "Goričice" of the Baška Valley in today's Jurandvor. Today's church was built in 1415. In 1550, it was consecrated to the Assumption of Mary by the bishop Albert Domnius de Gliricis.

Next to the church was the house of the Brotherhood of Our Lady of Gorica, whose statute is kept in Zagreb, being the oldest statute of a brotherhood in Croatia written in Glagolitic script (1425). In 1603, the brotherhood had one hundred members. Members of the Brotherhood were also Benedictines from nearby St. Lucia Abbey, who managed the Sanctuary until the collapse of the monastery in 1465. Some members of the family of the Frankopan princes of Krk (Nikola IV with his wife Dorotheja, Prince Ivan and Princess Elizabeta) also belonged to the brotherhood.

The baroque statue of Our Lady of Gorica holding Christ Child by unknown sculptor originates from the 16th century. Its gilding was restored in 1877.

A testimony of Bishop David from 1590 states that this is the main shrine on the island of Krk, and the local pastor records in 1673 that there is a Holy Mass in the shrine on every holiday and Sunday, and that the faithful make pilgrimages to Our Lady in processions fifteen times a year.

The 237 votive stairs to the top of the hill were built 1877–1891. Stations of the Cross were cast in bronze on them, blessed on the First Sunday of Lent in 2003. Interior artwork (altar) was painted by Celestin Medović. Brass church bell was made in 1459 to announce bishop's visitation to the Baška Valley.

In 1896, Pope Leo XIII gave locals and pilgrims the possibility of obtaining complete forgiveness on the feasts of the Assumption of Mary, Nativity of Mary, Spiritual Monday and Pentecost. In 1899, the Holy Rite Choir in Rome allowed the celebration of the Marian votive Mass in the sanctuary.

Since 1993, there has been a therapeutical community and an advisory centre for addicts.
