= Batomalj =

- Village
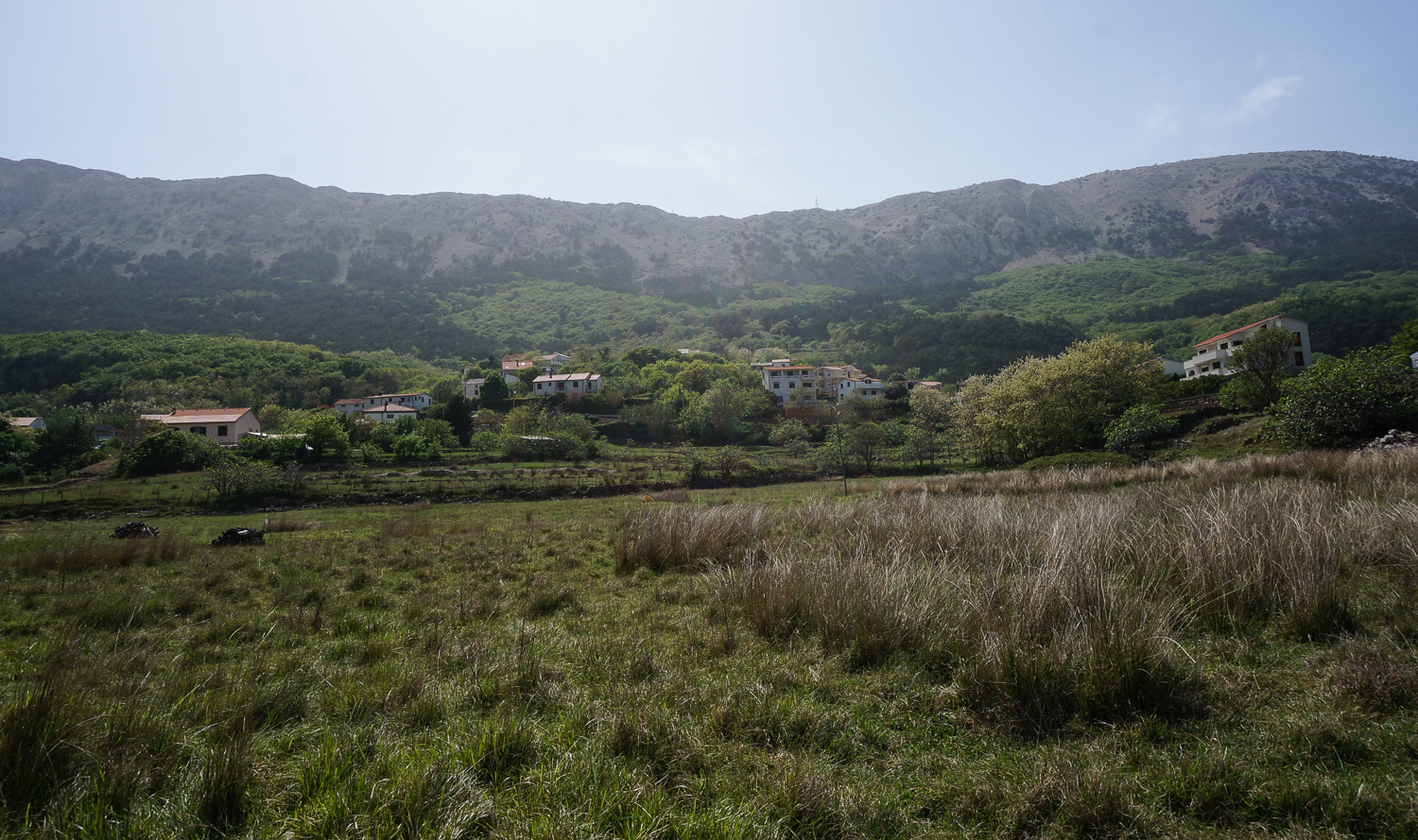
- View of Batomalj

- Location within Krk Location within Croatia
- Coordinates: 44°58′24″N 14°43′41″E
- Country: Croatia
- County: Primorje-Gorski Kotar
- Municipality: Baška

Area
  - Total: 40.2 km^{2} (15.5 sq mi)

Population (2021)
  - Total: 127
  - Density: 3.16/km^{2} (8.18/sq mi)
- Time zone: UTC+1 (CET)
  - Summer (DST): UTC+2 (CEST)

Batomalj is a small village located on the island of Krk, 3 km to the east of Baška and just to the southeast of Jurandvor. The Sanctuary of the Mother of God of Gorica (Croatian: Svetište Majke Božje Goričke), which is believed to date back to the 11th century, is located to the northeast of the village.

== History ==
In 2018, on the day of Saint Florian, patron saint of firefighters, the house of musician Sebastian Bach in Batomalj caught on fire. Firefighters received the call at 20:18, and both the DVD Baška and the JVP Grada Krka responded. 90 metres (300 ft) of hose had to be laid to reach the house, but the fire was successfully localised by 21:07.

== Governance ==
=== Local ===
It is the seat of its own local committee.
