= Vela Luka Bay =

Bay in Croatia

Vela Luka is a bay on the Croatian island of Krk.

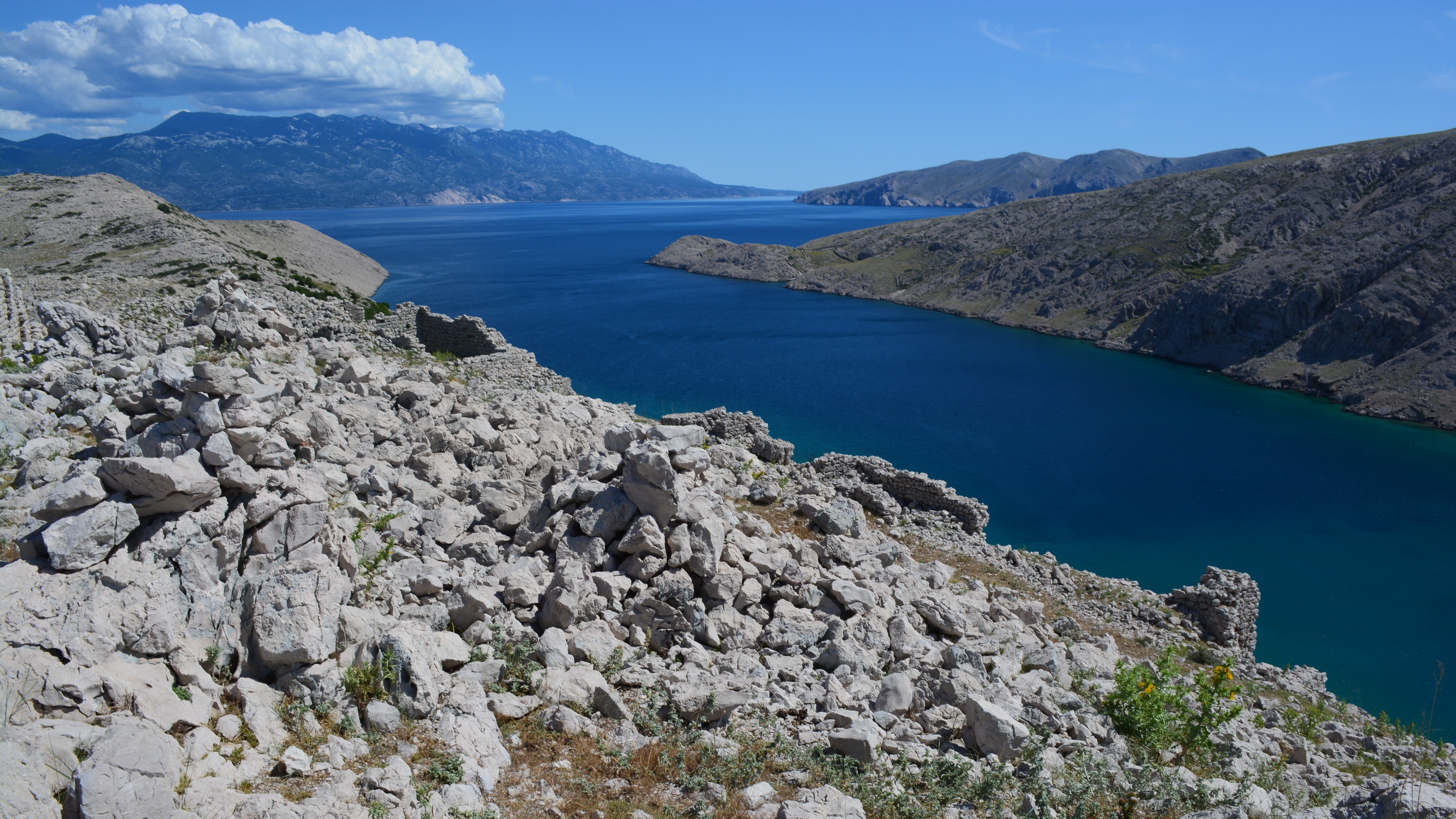
View of Vela Luka from Korintia

== Geography ==
It is located on the south-eastern part of the island of Krk in the Baška municipality and on the sea route from Baška to Senj. It is about 1.8 km long and about 400 meters wide. On the south-eastern side it closes the Cape Sokol. At the entrance to the cove the depth is over 60 meters, and from the middle of the bay the depth gradually falls. The bottom is predominantly sandy. At the end of the bay is a large sandy beach . There are several mostly ruinous coves in the cove. It is only a beach facility that works in summer as a catering facility. There is also a concrete mullet near it, but the depth is just 1.5 meters away. There is a somewhat greater depth (2–3 m) with the L-shaped mill located on the eastern coast of the bay. There is a source of drinking water at the end of the bay.

Apart from by boat from the sea, the bay can also be reached on foot from Baška. The trail is about 6 km long and rises to a height of 300 meters and then goes down to the sea. The trails are diverse because of the large number of karst phenomena (canyons, cliffs), numerous centuries-old pastry drywall and many panoramic vistas of Baška, Prvić Island, Senjska vrata and Vela and Mala Luka.

Vela Luka bay is open towards the south, and the wind in the south creates great waves. Even though it is shrouded, it is not suitable for shelter from the wind, because burrs created by boulders bounce back from the west coast of the bay and create whirlwinds and great sea disturbances. However, leaving the boat from the bay can be more dangerous as it comes to the area where one of the strongest strikes in the Adriatic is coming. The most common wind is a bura which is very common in summer.

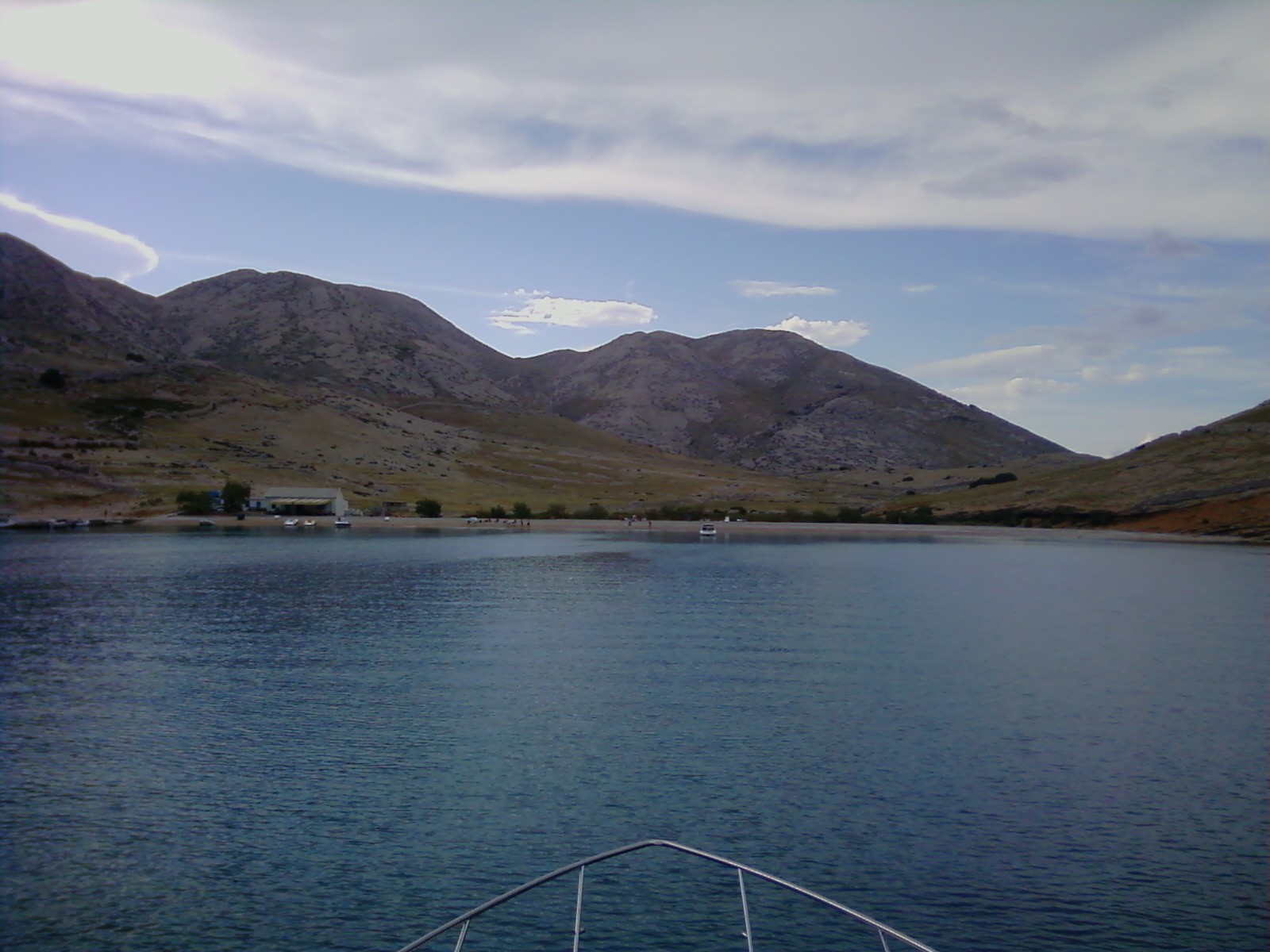
Beach from the water

== History ==
In the area between Vele and Male Luke, which is called Bosar, in ancient times there was a Roman settlement. It is thought to have been used to oversee the strategically important Senj Gate on the mainland. The remains of Roman clay and counterfeit Roman coins were found in this area. Also found was golden Byzantine money, which is in favor of the theory that during the time of Byzantine rule on Krk there was also a settlement which in the local legends has the name Corinthia., In addition, the ruins of a Byzantine fortress from the time of Emperor Justinian (6th century) on the hill above the remains of this settlement are. Out of the settlements there were only rock clumps that point to the arrangement of former houses and buildings. Nearby close to the harbor of Mala Luka, remains of a Liburnian-era shipyard have been found.,

The entire area was once under vineyards owned by the Baška family Dujmović. After the Second World War, vineyards were nationalized, and then the days were co-operative, but soon abandoned.

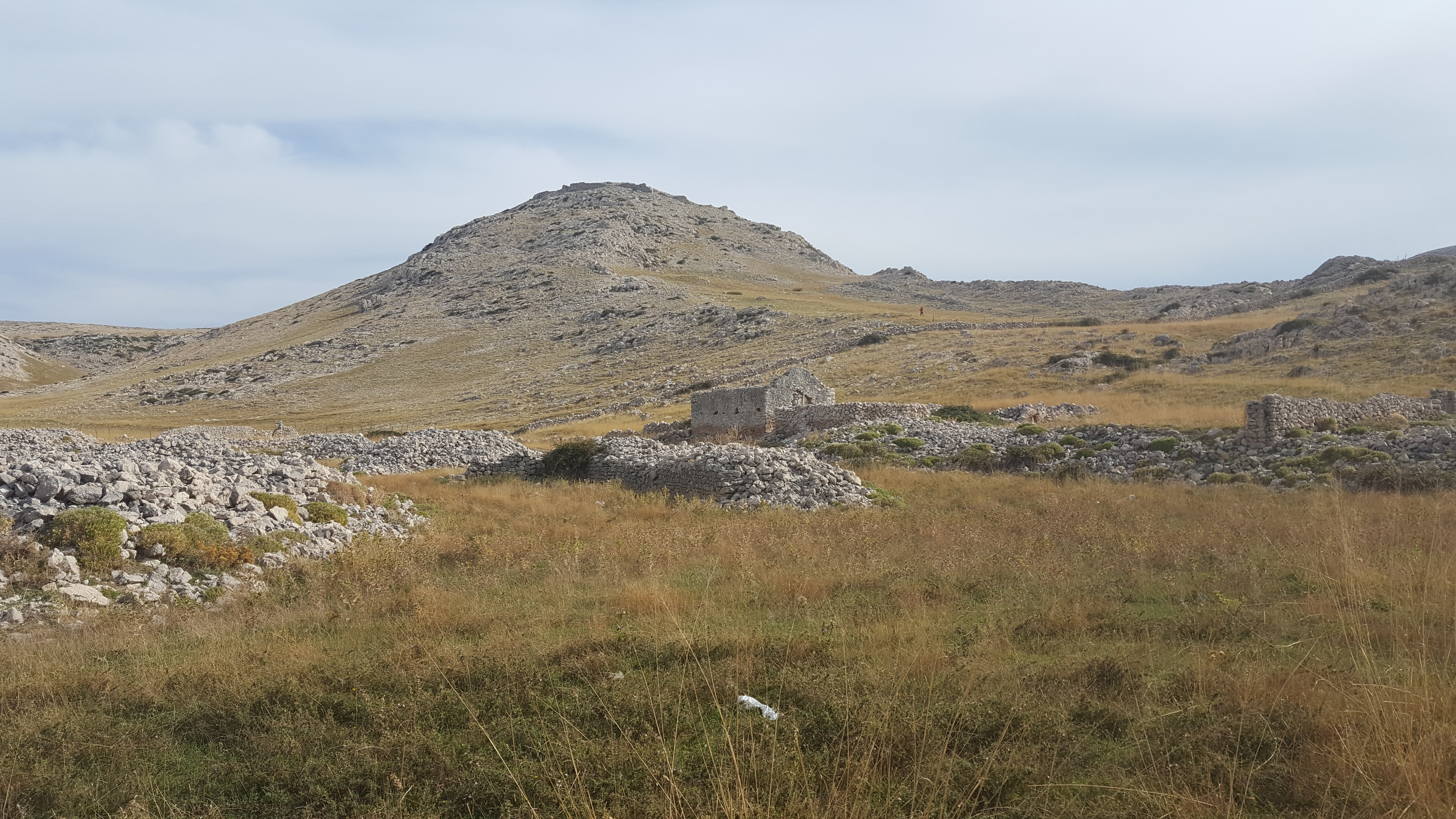
Remains of St. Nicholas near Vela Luka

In the area between Vela Luka and Mala Luka there are the ruins of the church of St. Nicholas, first mentioned in 1426. It was in bad condition in 1590, and in 1603 it was mentioned that it was without altar and roof. Today there are still all the walls and the apse.

== Tourism ==
Apart from the catering facility in the cove, there are no other tourist facilities. In the summer from Baška tourists go to the bay via boats taxis. As a rule they bring them in the morning and return to Baška in the evening.

== Sources ==
http://peljar.cvs.hr/show_place_info.php?id=799&type

== Literature ==
- Lešić, Denis: The Island of Krk - Guide to Word and Image, 2003.
- Bolonić, Mihovil, Žic Rokov, Ivan: Krk Island Through the Ages, Christian Present, Zagreb, 2002.
