= Obzova =

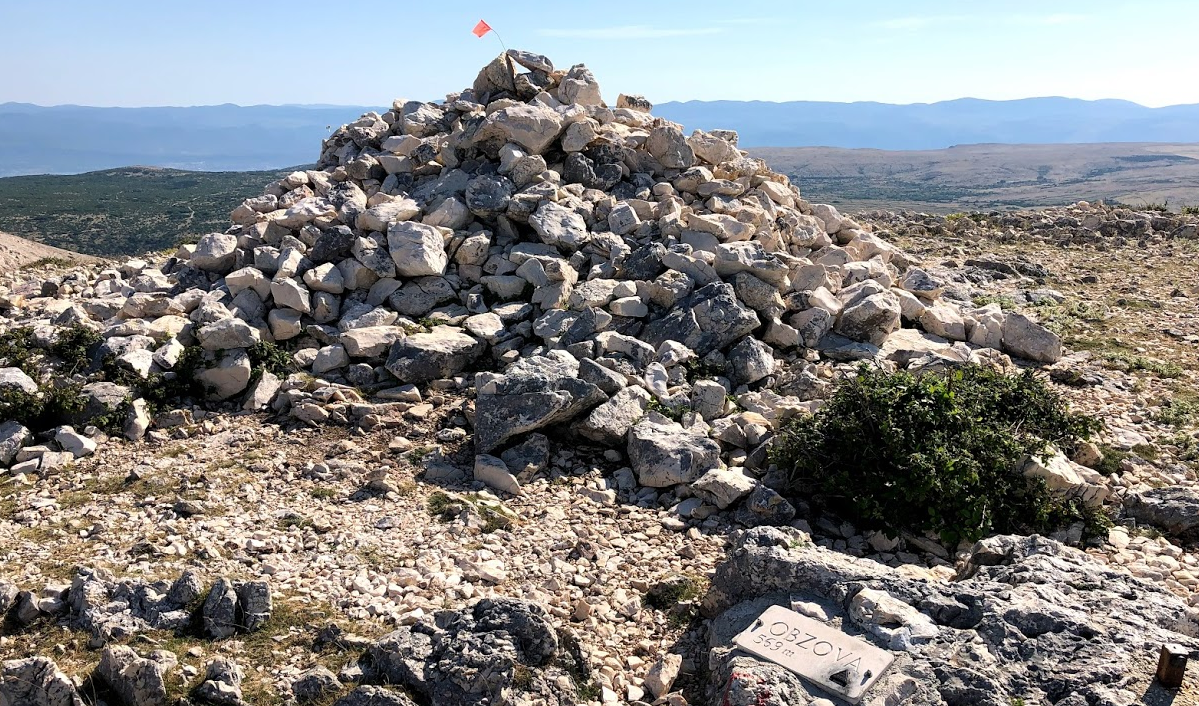
- Highest point on Obzova

Highest point
- Elevation: 568 m (1,864 ft)
- Prominence: 568 m (1,864 ft)
- Isolation: 17.75 km (11.03 mi) to Oštra glavica
- Coordinates: 44°59′40″N 14°41′29″E

Geography
- Location within Croatia
- Location: Croatia
- Parent range: Dinaric Alps

Climbing
- Easiest route: moderate hike

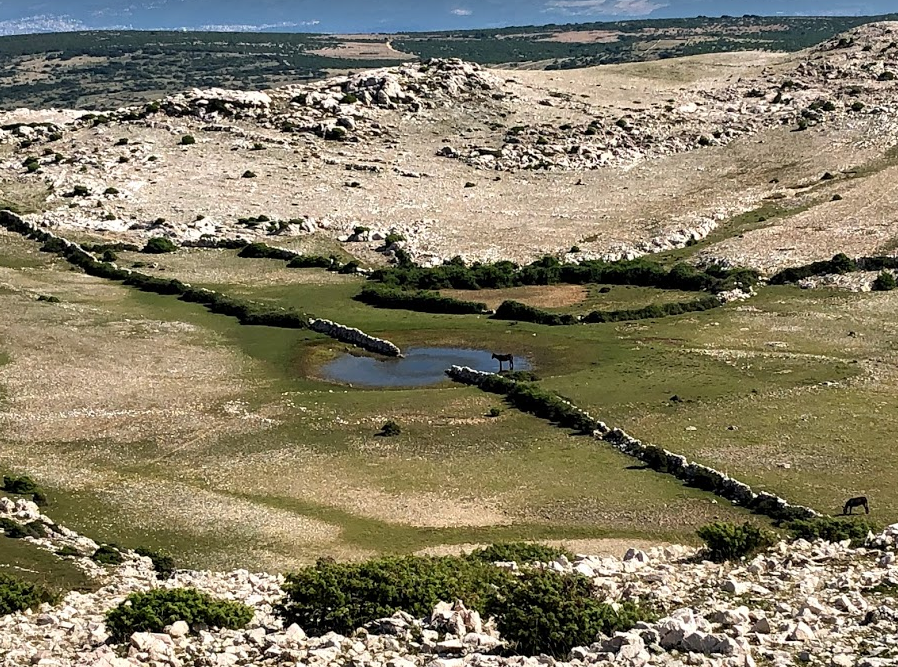
Sinkhole 'Vela lokva' close to Obzova

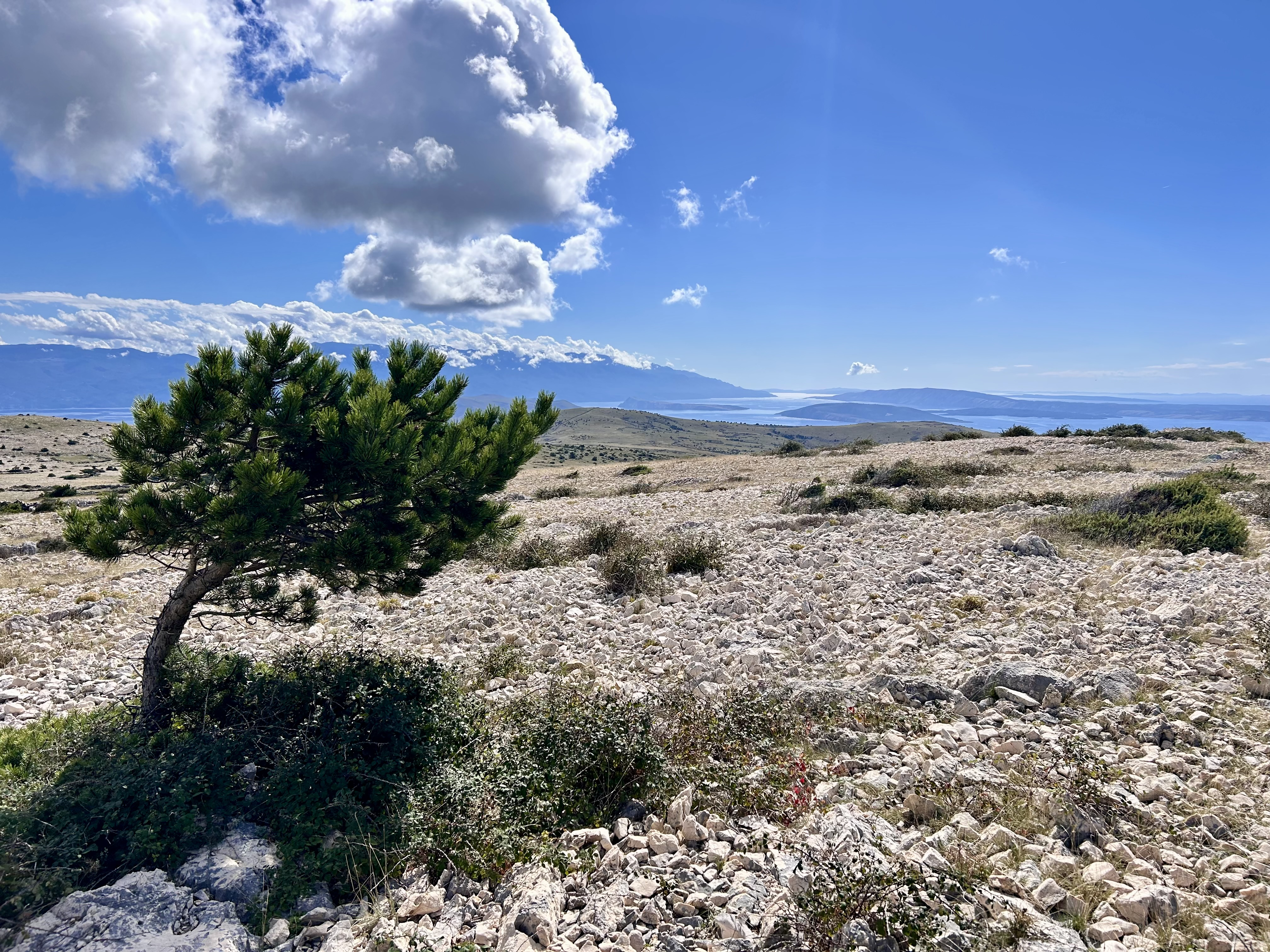
A view from the top of Obzova to the south

Obzova is a mountain located on the Croatian island of Krk and the highest point of the island.

It lies in the middle of a Karst plateau in the south-eastern part of the island and is marked by a stone-pile, with points of similar height Veli Vrh and Vrska Glava to east and west.

== See also ==
- List of mountains in Croatia
