= Valun =

Village in Primorje-Gorski Kotar, Croatia

Valun Vallòn di Cherso
- Village
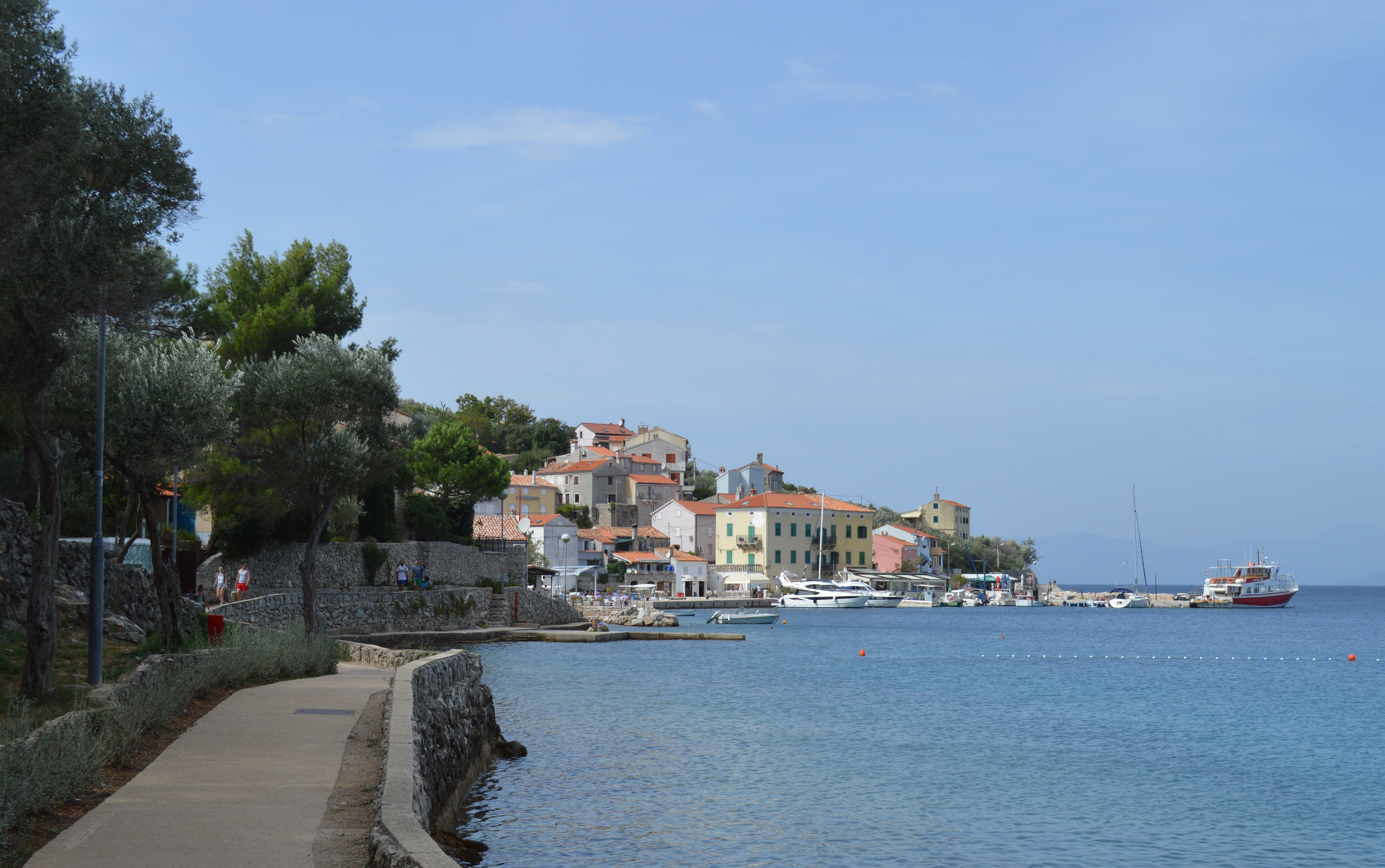
- View from beach

- Location within Croatia
- Coordinates: 44.90524°N 14.35980°E
- Country: Croatia
- County: Primorje-Gorski Kotar
- Town: Cres

Area
  - Total: 8.3 km^{2} (3.2 sq mi)

Population (2021)
  - Total: 64
  - Density: 7.7/km^{2} (20/sq mi)
- Time zone: UTC+1 (CET)
  - Summer (DST): UTC+2 (CEST)
- Postal code: 51557
- Area code: 051
- Vehicle registration: RI

Valun (Italian: Vallòn di Cherso) is a village located on the Croatian island of Cres, in Primorje-Gorski Kotar. Administratively, it is part of the town of Cres. As of 2021, it had a population of 64.

Valun is a fisherman’s village located to the southwest of the town of Cres. The village of Valun was originally founded as the port of the now abandoned village of Bućov.

The village is famous for being the location where one of the oldest Croatian Glagolitic inscriptions, the Valun tablet, was found.

== Architecture ==
A church dedicated to Saint Nicholas (44.9073°N 14.3594°E) is on the cape in Valun.

The church Sv. Marije kod Krunice (44.9047°N 14.3609°E), dedicated to Saint Mary, is in the bight of Valun.

A chapel dedicated to the Sacred Heart (44.9002°N 14.36276°E) is on the road from Valun to the plateau.

A Church dedicated to Saint Mark (44.89731°N 14.36349°E) is on the plateau above Valun.

== Gallery ==
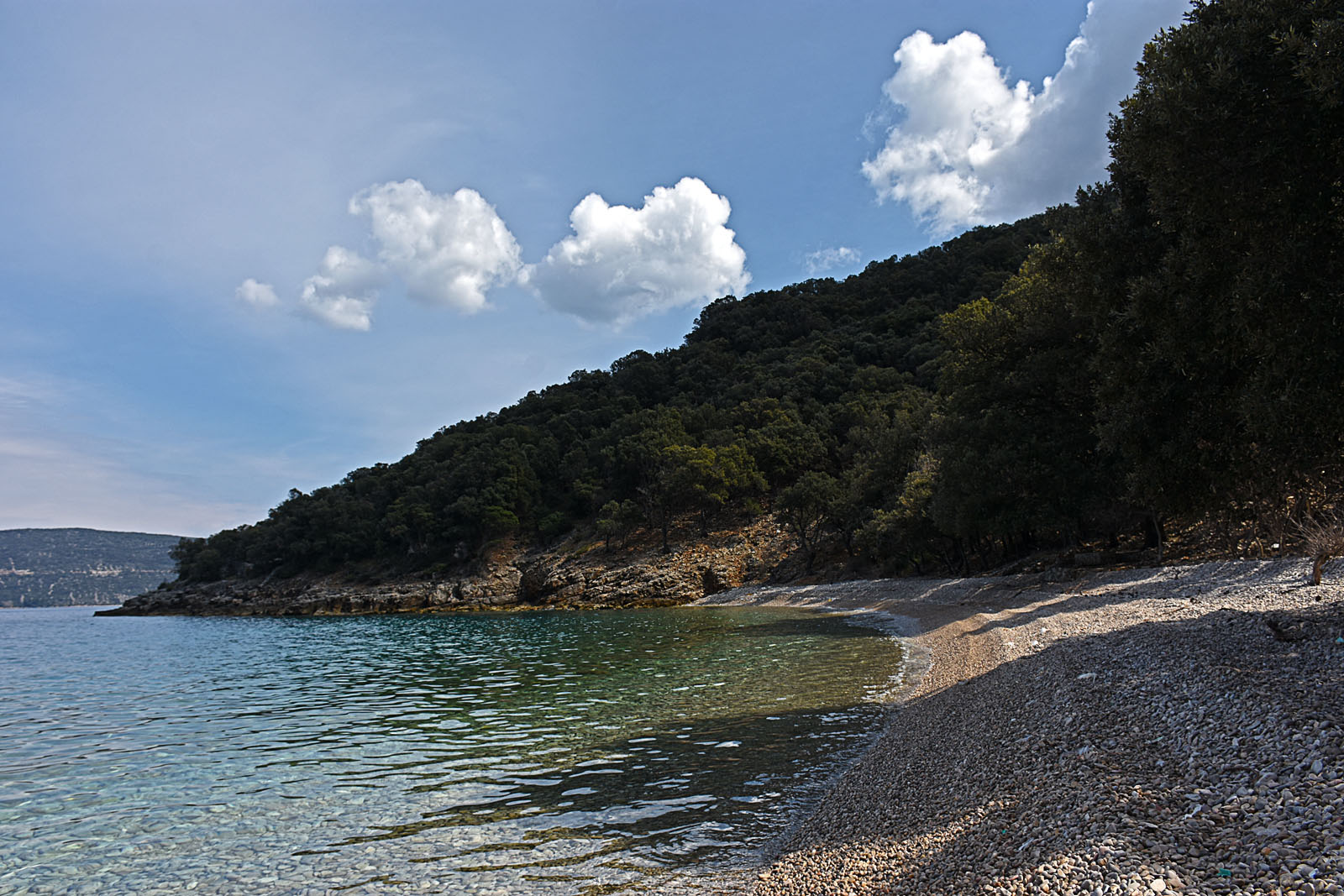
Crnikova bay

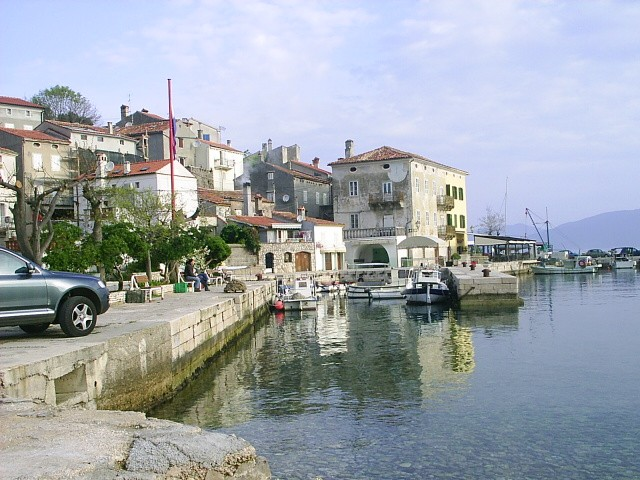
City centre

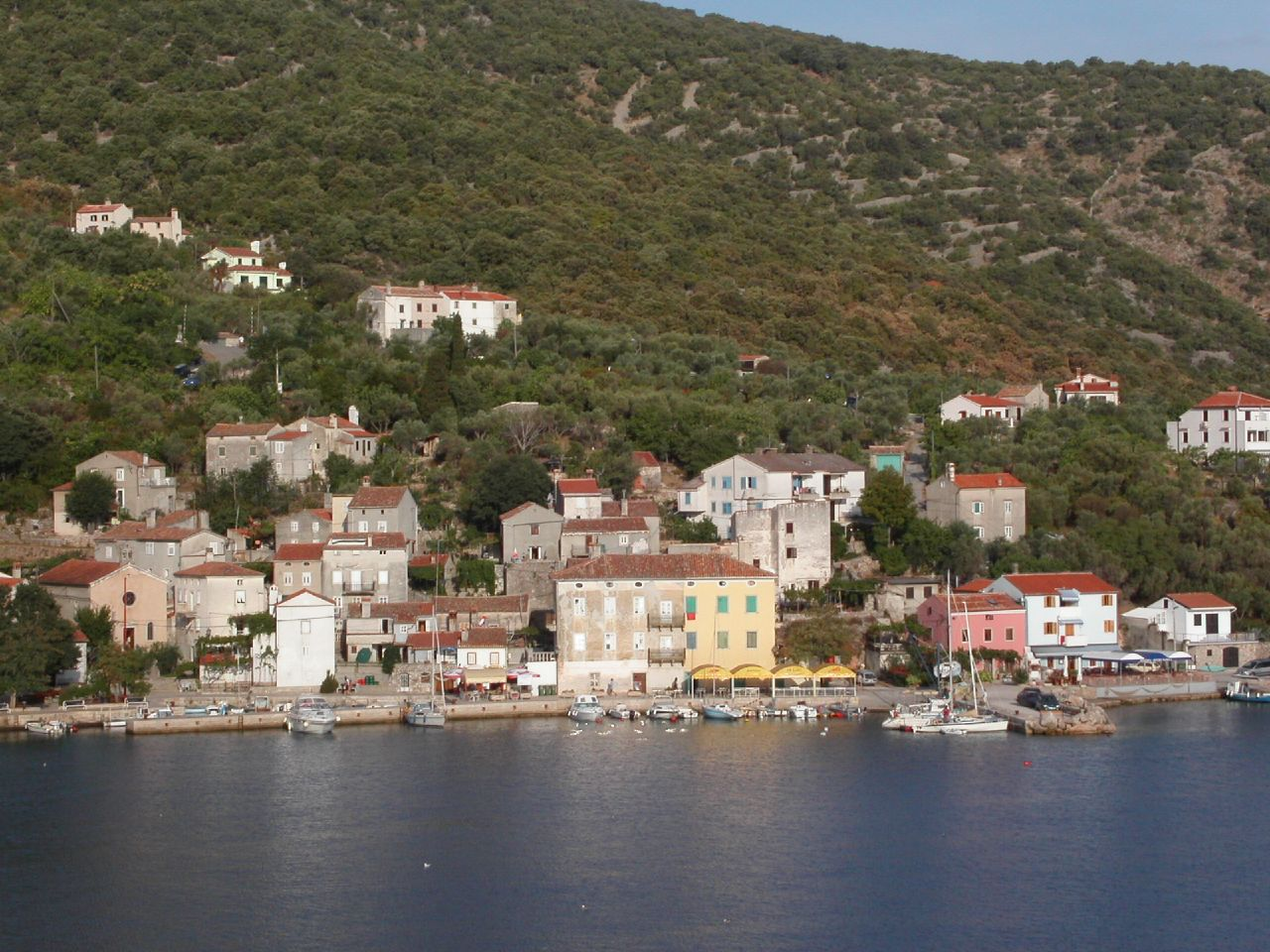
View from sea

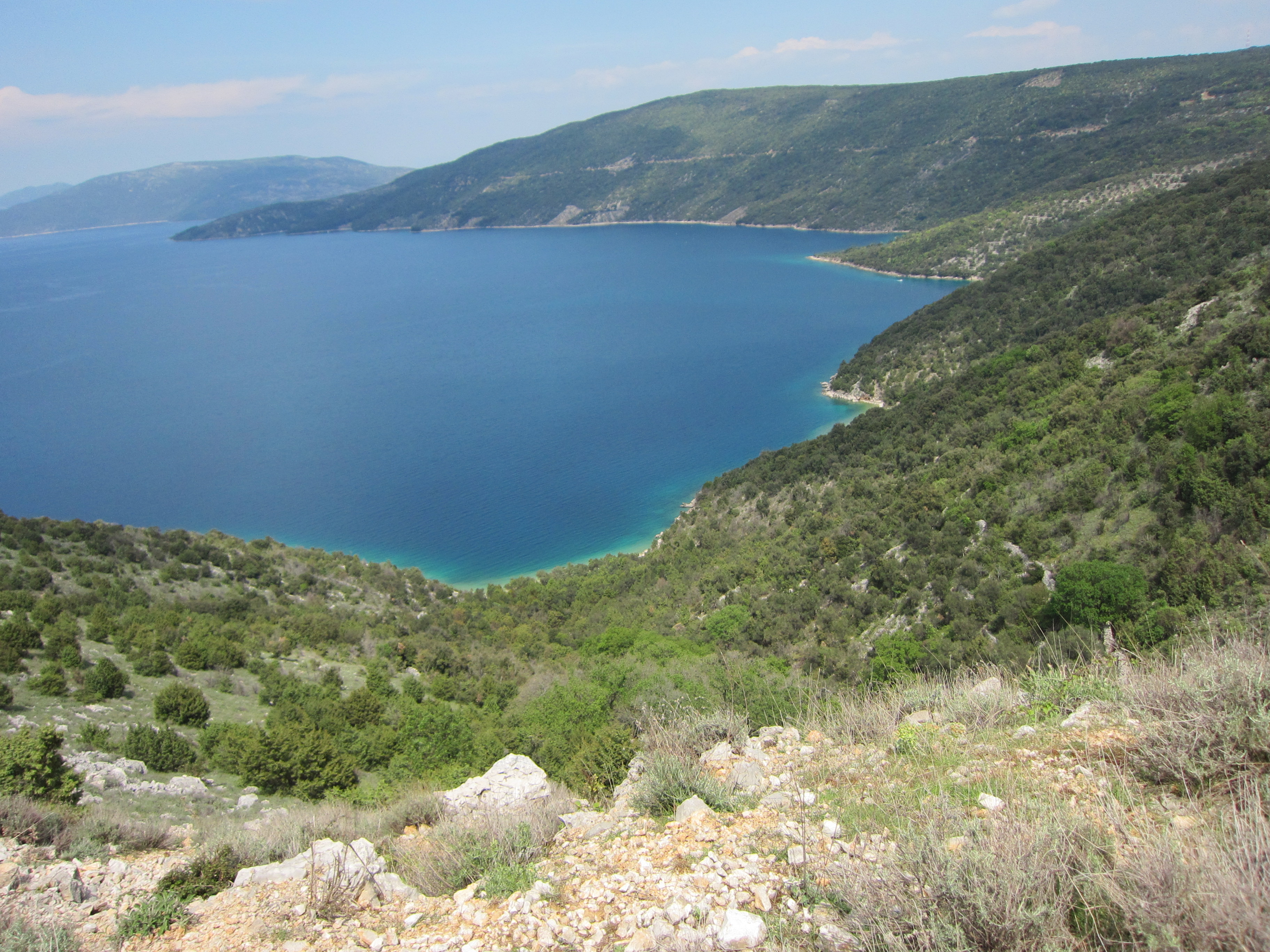
Valun bay
