= Baška, Croatia =

Baška
- Municipality
- Općina Baška; Municipality of Baška
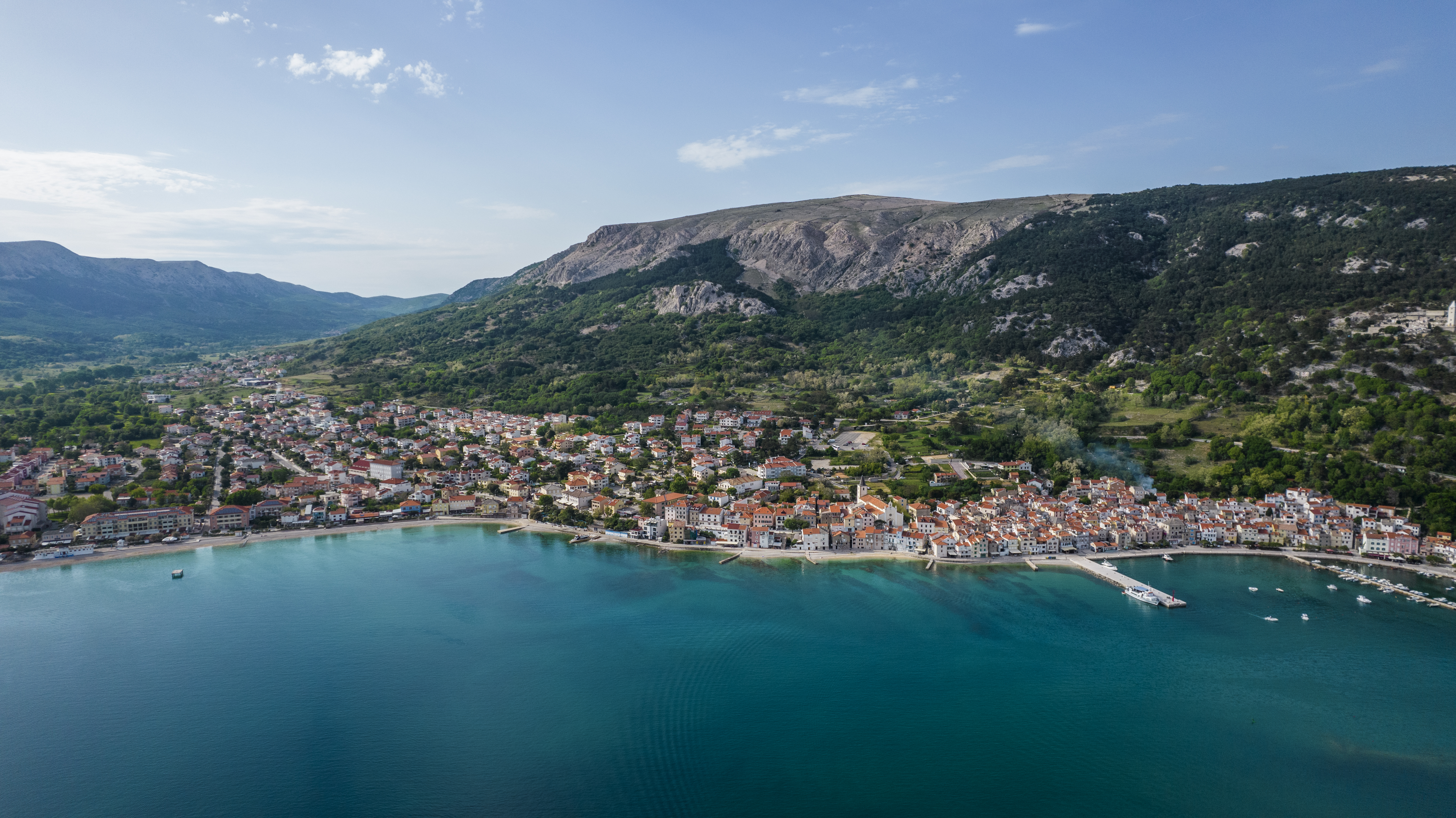
- View of Baška

- Location of Baška within Croatia Location of Baška within Krk
- Coordinates: 44°58′N 14°45′E
- Country: Croatia
- County: Primorje-Gorski Kotar County

Government
  - Municipal mayor: Toni Juranić

Area
  - Municipality: 98.9 km^{2} (38.2 sq mi)
  - Urban: 16.1 km^{2} (6.2 sq mi)

Population (2021)
  - Municipality: 1,656
  - Density: 16.7/km^{2} (43.4/sq mi)
  - Urban: 899
  - Urban density: 55.8/km^{2} (145/sq mi)
- Time zone: UTC+1 (CET)
  - Summer (DST): UTC+2 (CEST)
- Postal code: 51523
- Area code: 051
- Vehicle registration: RI
- Website: baska.hr

Baška (pronounced [bâʃka]) is a village and a municipality located on the southeast of the island of Krk, in Primorje-Gorski Kotar County, Croatia. According to the 2011 census, the municipality has a population of 1,656, with 899 in Baška itself.

This cultural and historical center with its old stone houses and narrow streets, has been a tourist destination since the 19th century and has developed into a popular resort. It is known for its inscribed stone monument from 1100, its many surrounding beaches, and its long tradition in tourism.

Baška has a rich cultural and historical heritage. Highlights are the early Christian archeological site from the 5th century, the renowned Baška tablet from the year 1100 found in the Church of St. Lucy in the nearby Jurandvor, the remains of a Roman settlement, as well as many historic churches and chapels. The local museum in Baška houses an ethnographic collection.

Baška is surrounded by woodlands and many sand and pebble beaches, most notably the 1,800-meter-long Baška beach (the Vela plaža, or “Great Beach”). Bunculuka Beach is a smaller clothing-optional pebble beach adjacent to the large Bunculuka naturist camping site. In the surrounding area, there are 16 hiking trails with a total length of over 80 km. Medicinal and other herbs, including wormwood, sage, thyme, and milfoil, grow in abundance.

== Settlements ==
Baška municipality comprises 4 settlements. Each of them is listed below, with their respective population as of 2021.

- Baška - 899 ▼
- Batomalj - 127 ▼
- Draga Bašćanska - 300 ▲
- Jurandvor - 330 ▲

== Religion ==
Its Catholic parish was first mentioned in 1425, and its parish church was built in 1723. In 1782, Baška alone had 40 priests, (Note: Jive Barbalić stari; Jive Barbalić mlaji; Jure Barbalić; Mate Barbalić stari; Mate Barbalić mlaji; Miho Dehanić; Mate Derencinović; Jive Dorčić; Mate Garžun; Bare Hargacić; Jive Hero; Jive Hrabrić; Mate Hrabrić; Pere Hrabrić; Miho Juranić; Mate Magašić; Miho Magašić; Jerko Milaci stari; Jerko Milaci mlaji; Dune Pajalić; Frane Pajalić; Miho Pajalić; Miko Pajalić stari; Niko Pajalić mlaji; Miho Seršić; Frane Seršić; Jive Šeršić; Barić Tomašić; Miho Tomašić; Paval Tomašić; Jerko Tojić; Jure Tojić; Mak? Tojić; Bare Zorić; Jure Zubrani; Dune Zubranić; Jive Zubranić; Miho Zubranić; Pere Zubranić; Illegible) not counting the parish priest Frane Hrabrić. In 1939, its parish had 2700 souls, plus 100 outside the country.

List of parish priests of Baška:

- Juraj Hrabrić (- 1752)
- Frane Hrabrić (20 March 1752 - 13/14 October 1777)
- Jure Mrakočić (1/2 November 1777 - 1806)
- Mate Magašić (July 1806 -)
- ...
- Dinko Vlakančić (b. 1885-09-04, primiz Stivan 1910-03-13)
  - Chaplain Ivan Medved (b. Frankolovo 1908-06-05, primiz Celje 1931-07-05)

== Governance ==
It is the seat of its own local committee.

== Monuments and sights ==
=== Art installation "Drops" ===
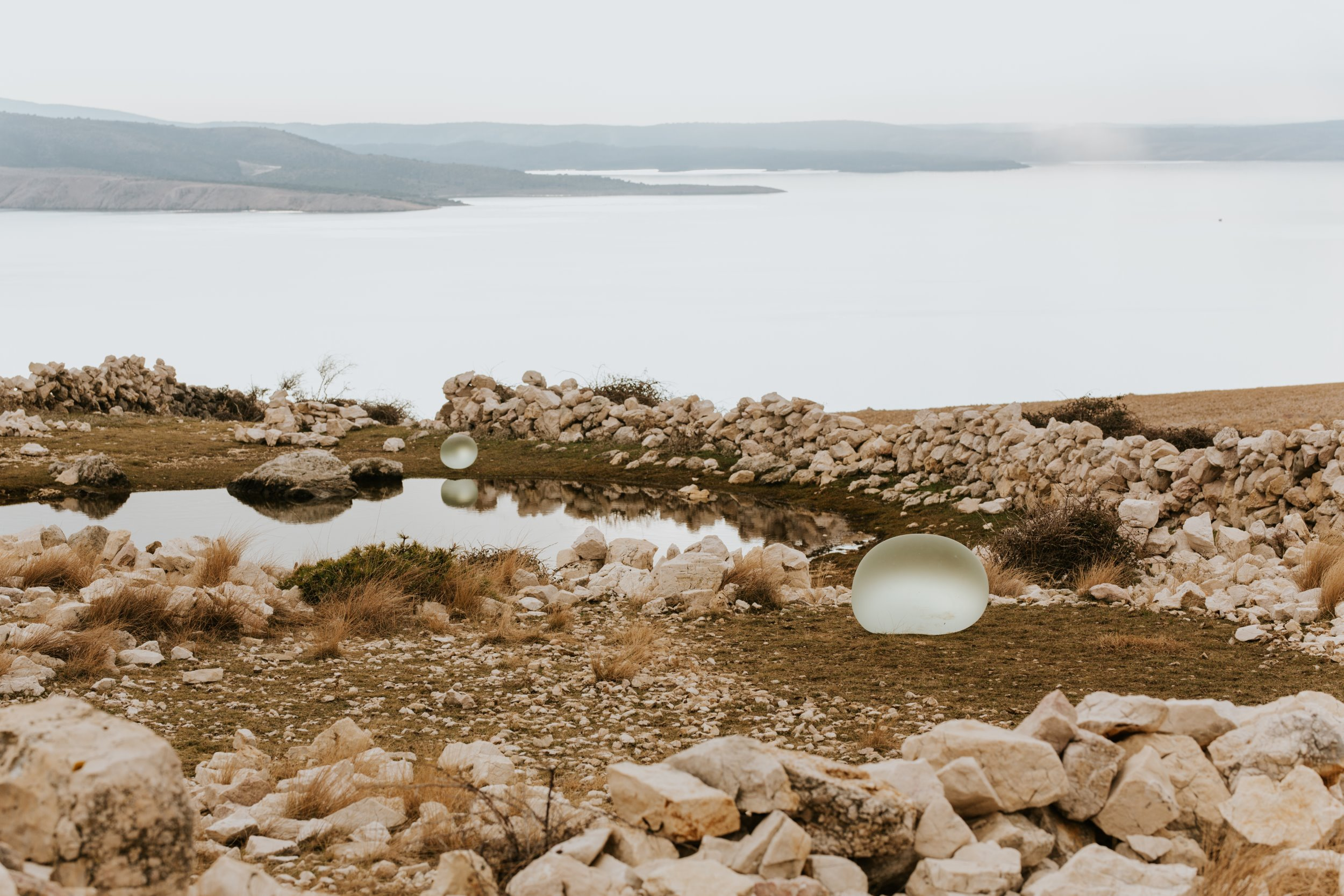
Art installation "Drops"

On the high and rounded ridges above Baška there is a place known as Ljubimer. It is where a site-specific art installation called "Drops", created by prestigious Chilean authors Smiljan Radić Clarke and Marcela Correa, found its permanent place. It is a unique work of art, designed to adorn this charismatic place permanently. The installation placed additional emphasis on traditional dry stone walls called mrgari, respecting their values and structure, and not overshadowing them in design or materials.

The authors describe its character: "Sometimes we find anonymous pieces that have been manufactured in strategically chosen places – and later abandoned – by others. They are naturally primitive, part of a lost memory… like the long dry stone wall in Baška. In these cases, the reality of the object is as important as discovering it by surprise, as if we were the first explorers to come across it."

== Gallery ==
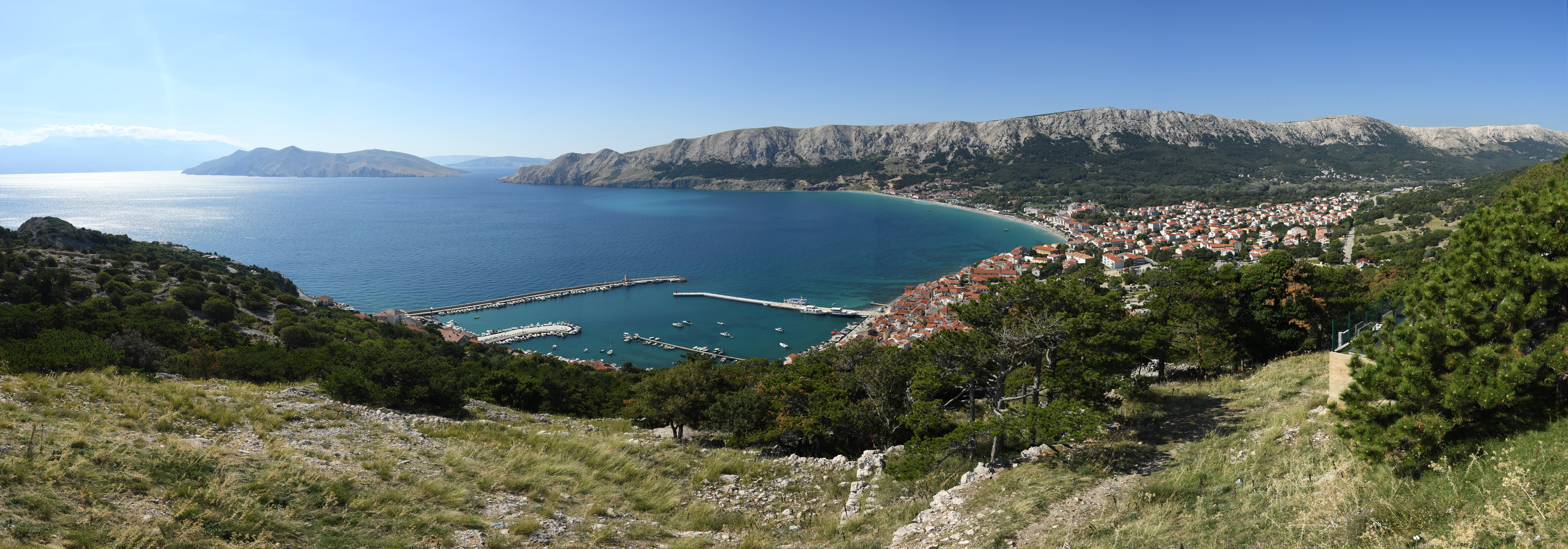
Panoramic view of Baška

== Bibliography ==
- Dorčić, Petar (1861). Popis Bašćanskih plovana.
- Draganović, Krunoslav (1939-04-20). Opći šematizam Katoličke crkve u Jugoslaviji. Sarajevo: Akademija "Regina Apostolorum".
