= Valun tablet =

11th-century bilingual tablet in Croatia

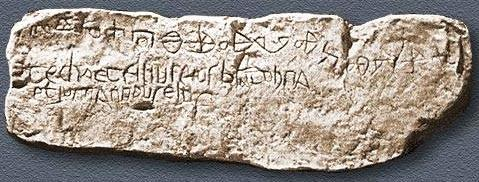
The Valun tablet.

The Valun tablet (Croatian: Valunska ploča) is an 11th-century bilingual (Old Croatian and Latin) and digraphic (Glagolitic and Latin) tablet, originally serving the role of a gravestone, found at the graveyard in Valun on the island of Cres, Croatia. It records that under the tablet three generations of one 11th-century Valun family rest in peace: the grandmother, her son and grandson (named Teha, Bratohna and Juna). Today, the Valun tablet is embedded in the wall of Saint Mary in Valun. Its bilinguality is important evidence of the coexistence of two ethnic and linguistic elements: old Romance and newly arrived Croatian.

== The tablet ==
The Valun tablet is a natural tablet, unprocessed by a carver, of a type that can commonly be found on karstic territory and employed by peasants for e.g. tiling the ground. According to Fučić it originally served as the marker of a shallowly dug grave at the church of Saint Mark in Bućevo above the present-day village of Valun on the island of Cres.

== The text ==
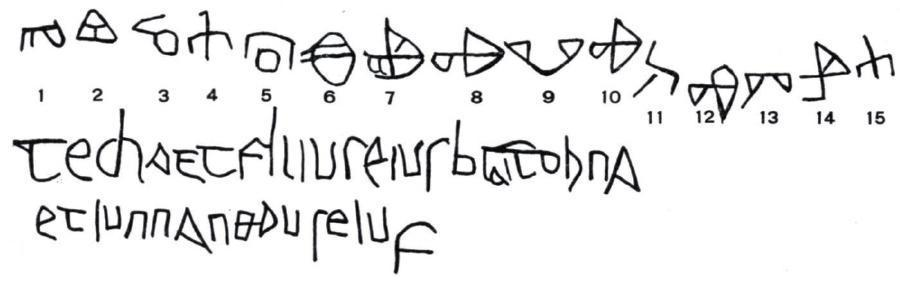
Latin and Croatian inscriptions of the Valun tablet.

The tablet is equipped with a bilingual inscription: one in Croatian, carved in an older, rounded Glagolitic, and a Latin inscription, carved with Caroline.

The Latin text can be easily read:

TECHA ET FILIUS EIUS BRATOHNA
ET IUNNA NEPUS EIUS

It's evident that the grave of 3 generations is in question, carrying old Croatian baptismal names. These are the grandmother Těha, her son Bratohna and her grandson Juna.

On the Glagolitic inscription, carrying the Old Croatian text, the names TĚHA and JUNA can easily be read, but BRATOHNA is missing. In the middle of the inscription 8 letters are found, two of which look unknown to Fučić, so he read the sequence as:

| S | ? | ? | Ъ | V | Ъ | K | Ъ |
| 5 | 6 | 7 | 8 | 9 | 10 | 11 | 12 |

The unknown letter (6) is according to Fučić old Glagolitic 'I', with a duplicated horizontal line separating the upper element from the lower. As for the unknown letter (7), the diagonal line in the eye of the letter N (14) in the word JUNA has led Fučić as a lead to the diagonal line in the letter (7), and notice that a carver has made an obvious mistake, carving at the wrong place a following semivowel. Now, after the word TĚHA word SINЪ "son" can be read, which matches to FILIUS "son" from the Latin text—and in the remaining group of letters VЪKЪ one should assume contracted NU in order to read VЪNUKЪ "grandson", in order to match the word from Latin text.

The Glagolitic inscription of the Valun tablet is thus:

| Symbol No. | 1 | 2 | 3 | 4 | 5 | 6 | 7 | 8 | 9 | 10 | | 11 | 12 | 13 | 14 | 15 |
| Original text | ⱅ | ⱑ | ⱈ | ⰰ | ⱄ | ⰻ | ⱀ | ⱏ | ⰲ | ⱏ | | ⰽ | ⱏ | ⱓ | ⱀ | ⰰ |
| Cyrillicized original text | т | ѣ | х | а | с | ї | н | ъ | в | ъ | | к | ъ | ю | н | а |
| Romanized original text | t | ě | h | a | s | i | n | ъ | v | ъ | (nu) | k | ъ | ju | n | a |

== Dating ==
Latin inscription in Caroline can date to 9th, 10th and 11th century. Glagolitic inscription is of markedly rounded Glagolitic.

The types of semivowels, triangular Ě, V with semicircular joint, K with long lateral line—all unambiguously point to the 11th century.

== Bibliography ==
- Premuda, Vinko (1912). "Još oble glagolica na Kvarneru ili o valunskoj ploči" [More Rounded Glagolitic on Kvarner or About the Valun Tablet]. Vjesnik Staroslavenske Akademije u Krku (in Croatian). 1 (published 1913): 70–72.
- Fučić, Branko (September 1971), "Najstariji hrvatski glagoljski natpisi" (PDF), Slovo (in Croatian), 21, Old Church Slavonic Institute: 227–254
- Fučić, Branko (1997), Terra incognita (in Croatian), Zagreb: Kršćanska sadašnjost, ISBN 953-151-154-3
