= Church of St. Lucy, Jurandvor =

11th-century church in Krk, Croatia

Coordinates: 44.977735°N 14.738224°E

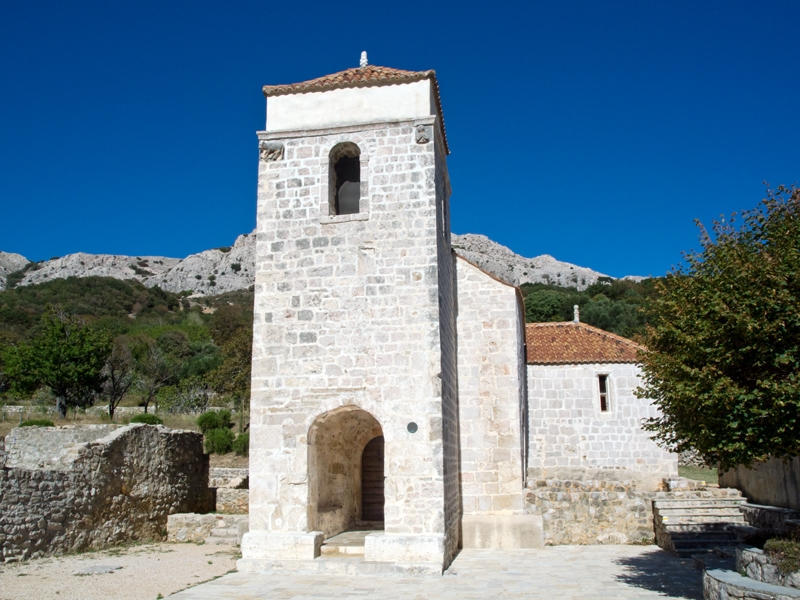
The Church of St. Lucy

The Church of St. Lucy (Croatian: Crkva svete Lucije) in Jurandvor near Baška, Krk, Croatia is a Romanesque Catholic church from the year 1100 with two major medieval Croatian artifacts: the Baška Tablet, and a checkerboard-pattern carving on the bell tower that is suspected to be one of the first instances of the Croatian coat of arms.

Archaeological research confirmed it was built on the site of a 6th century church, where an ancient Roman villa rustica was also located. In the 9th and 10th centuries, the locality was used by early Christianized Croats as a graveyard. The church saw a number of renovations from the early until the 14th century; by the start of the latter it had come within the purview of the local Benedictines. In the 14th century, a bell tower was constructed which had remain functional until the 19th century.

The art that features in the church was considered to date to early Romanesque period (11–12th century), as the building itself. Croatian art historian Pavuša Vežić argues instead that the art was worked into the building some time after its construction as he believed the art dates to late Romanesque period (13–14th century) in style and execution.
