= Krk =

Island in Croatia

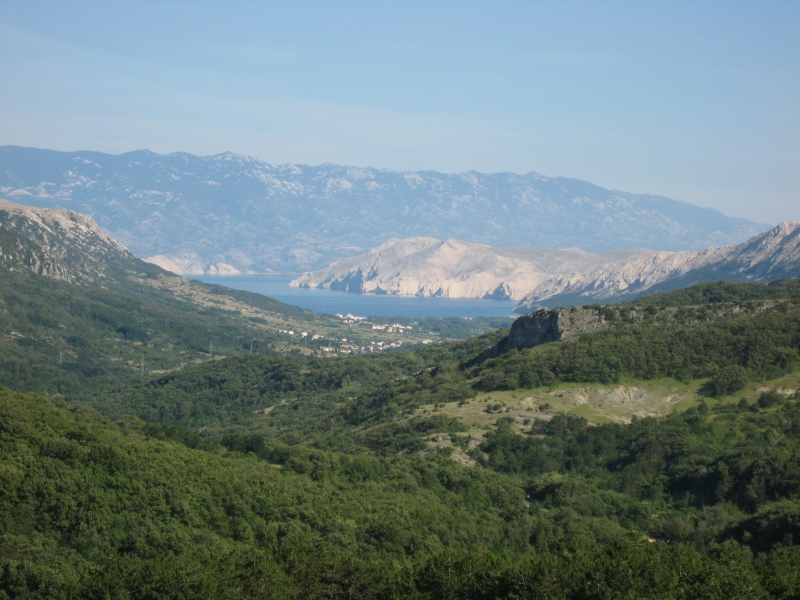
- Bašćanska Draga
- Interactive map of Krk

Geography
- Location: Adriatic Sea
- Coordinates: 45°4′N 14°36′E
- Area: 405.80 km^{2} (156.68 sq mi)
- Highest elevation: 568 m (1864 ft)
- Highest point: Obzova

Administration
- Croatia
- County: Primorje-Gorski Kotar County
- Largest settlement: Krk (pop. 6,816)

Demographics
- Population: 19,916 (2021)
- Pop. density: 44/km^{2} (114/sq mi)

Krk (pronounced [kr̩̂k]; Italian: Veglia; Istro Romanian: Krk; Vegliot Dalmatian: Vikla; archaic German: Vegl, Latin: Curicta; Ancient Greek: Κύρικον, romanized: Kyrikon) is a Croatian island in the northern Adriatic Sea, located near Rijeka in the Bay of Kvarner and part of Primorje-Gorski Kotar county. Krk is tied with Cres as the largest Adriatic island, depending on the methodology used to measure the coastline. Krk is the most populous island in the Adriatic, with multiple towns and villages that contain a total of 19,916 (2021) inhabitants.

== History ==
=== Prehistory ===
Map

Archaeological findings have indicated that the island had been inhabited continuously since the Neolithic period, although very little information about the earliest people is known. In later periods, Greek and Latin sources refer to Κύριστα (Ancient Greek) or Curicta (Latin) as one of the Apsyrtidian or Electridian islands held by the people known as Liburnians. The Liburnians called the island "Curicum", which is the name assumed to have been given to the island by its original inhabitants.

There are the remains of prehistoric settlements near Draga Bašćanska, as well as Bronze and Iron Age earthworks near Malinska, Dobrinj, Vrbnik and Baška.

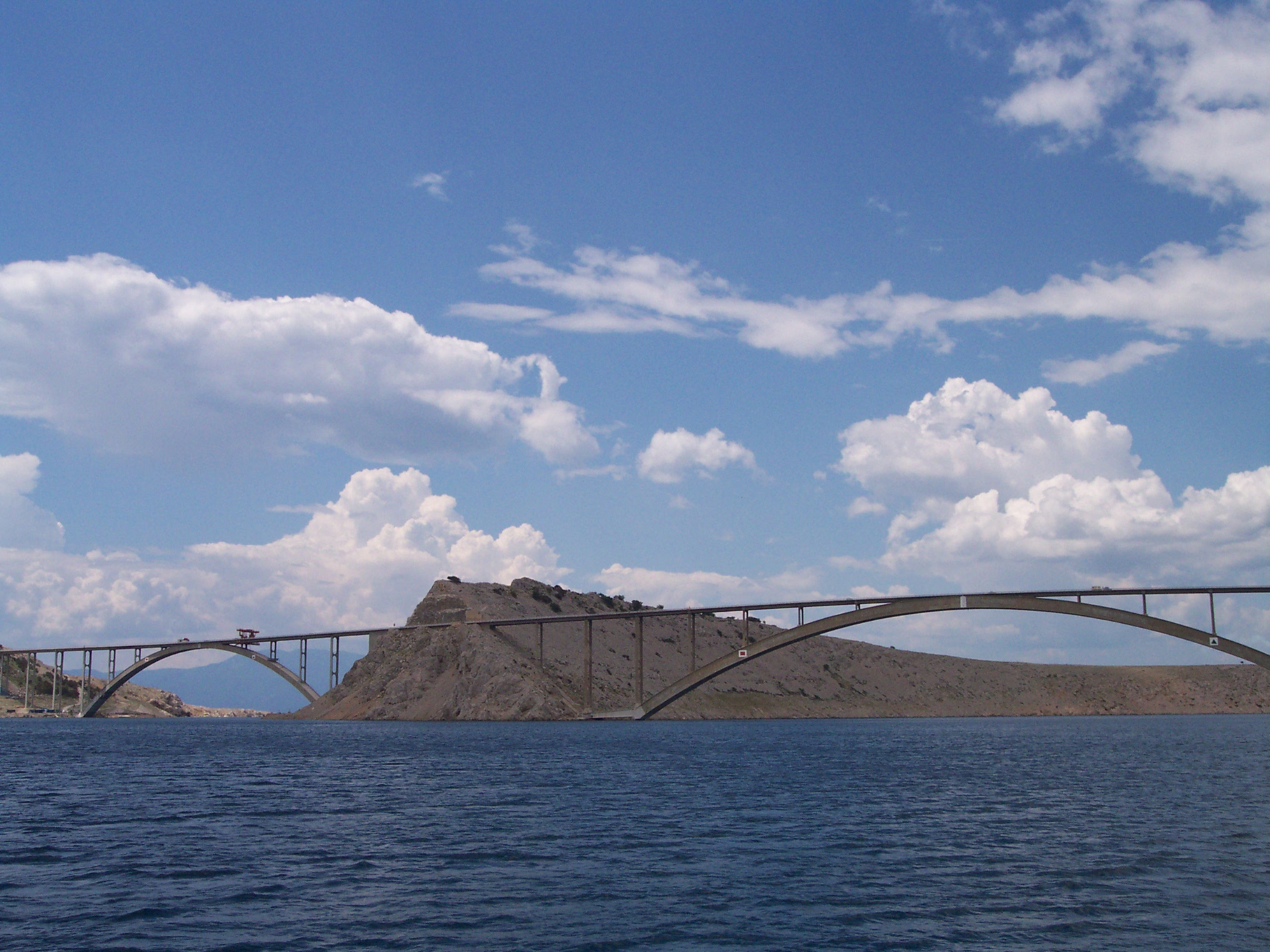
Krk Bridge

=== Roman era ===
Krk came under Roman rule once they defeated the Liburnians. The town of Krk (Curicum) became a town with Italic law whose status evolved to give it the rights of a municipality. Nothing is known about the internal organizations of the town of Krk during this time. Near the present-day Franciscan monastery, the remains of thermal baths have been found. The defensive walls of Roman Curicum were among the most secure of all the towns on the Eastern Adriatic fortified by the Romans. Work began on their construction during the Civil War in Rome (50 BCE) and they were further strengthened in the 160s CE, to enable them to withstand attacks by the Quadi and Marcomanni who were at that time threatening the Adriatic. Not far from Krk in 49 BCE there was a decisive sea battle between Caesar and Pompey, which was described impressively by the Roman writer Lucan (39–65 CE) in his work Pharsalia. When the Empire was divided, Krk came under the Eastern Roman Empire.

Municipium Flavium Fulfinum is an old Roman settlement near the town of Omišalj. Archaeological findings show the first traces of settlement in the area dating back into the 1st century when the Romans settled the area following the Illyrian Wars as a retirement community for soldiers. The Romans constructed the city for the retired Roman soldiers during the Flavian dynasty. The settlement was abandoned in Late antiquity.

Roman ruins can be seen today in some parts of the town of Krk, for example mosaics in some houses. A temple to the Roman goddess Venus was discovered near the small gate (mala vrata) in the old city. This is the only temple dedicated to the goddess Venus to be found on the eastern side of the Adriatic and dates back to 1st century BC. It is unique because direct approval from the emperor’s family was needed before building could commence for such a statue to be built. The temple is located within a shop just inside of the small gate.

=== Migration period ===
The walls of the town of Krk could not withstand attacks by the Avars (7th century), but in contrast to Salona, Scardona and Aeona, life in Krk quickly returned to normal, and Krk functioned as one of the Dalmatian city-states. The Croats penetrated into the town on several occasions. They retained many of the Roman names they found there and so it is said that Krk has a "mosaic dialect". Following the Treaty of Aachen (812) the entire island was ceded to the Byzantine Empire and was governed according to the norms of that Empire. During the reign of Emperor Constantine Porphyrogenitus (10th century), Krk was known as Vekla, of which the Romanized variant, also used by the Venetians, was Veglia.

=== Reign of Croatian counts and kings ===
There are no extant documents showing when Krk became part of the Croatian state. It is known that from around 875 the Byzantine town paid the Croatian rulers 110 gold pieces a year to be able peacefully to keep their hold there. While the Croatian state was being established, Krk found itself on the Venetians' route to the Mediterranean. The Venetians conquered the town for the first time in 1001, and from then Krk's history was closely linked with the history of the Republic of Venice for seven centuries. During the reign of Peter Krešimir IV the Croatian rulers regained their power, but the Venetians took Krk for the second time in 1118.

=== Reign of the Krk counts (from 1430 on – the Frankopan family) ===
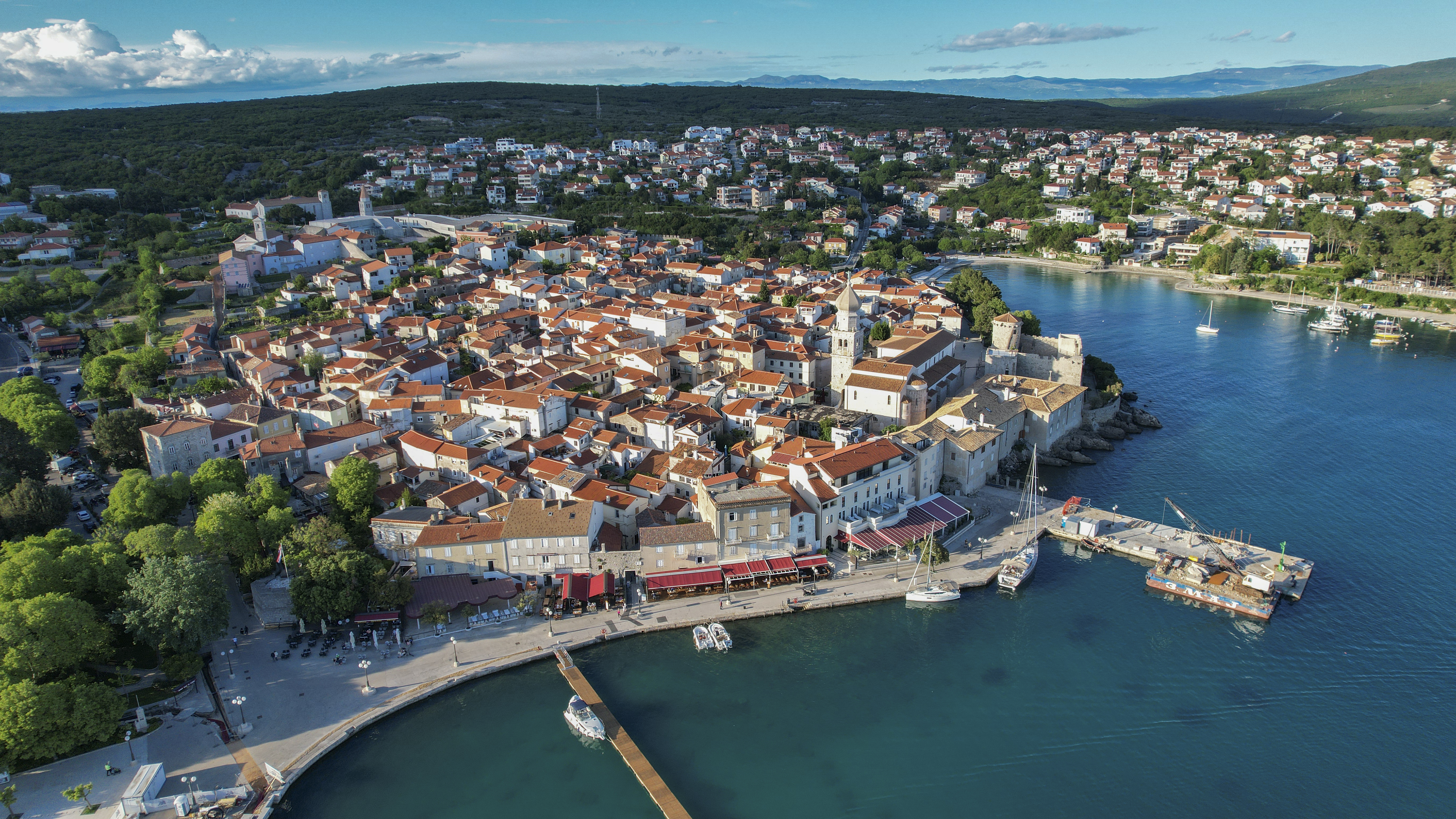
Town of Krk

When the Venetians conquered Krk for the second time in 1118, the local noble family, the unknown Dujams, received Krk as part of a pact with Venice, and they became Counts. When Dujam died in 1163, Venice allowed his sons to make their position hereditary, after a payment of 350 Byzantine gold pieces as tax. In a short time the Krk Counts became so powerful, that at one time from 1244 to 1260, Venice rescinded their authority. In 1260, Doge Reniero Zeno granted half of Krk to Škinela I and his descendants, and the other half to the sons of Vid II and their descendants, under the condition that they refrain from piracy. They increased economic exploitation, but they also endeavoured to strengthen old traditions and rights with various statutes (the Vinodol Code 1288 and the Vrbnik Statute, 1388). Dujam's youngest son, who died in 1209, succeeded in extending his authority to the mainland, began to serve the Croatian-Hungarian King and received the district of Modruš. Due to his economic strength and social standing, his opponents fought each other for his favour. The Counts became so strong that no power could threaten them (until the Turks). Members of his family were leaders in Split, Trogir and Senj, and from 1392 one of them (Ivan V), became a Croatian-Dalmatian Ban. In 1430 they took the surname Frankopan (Frangipane), claiming to have Roman origins. That year they adopted a coat of arms showing two lions breaking a piece of bread (Latin: frangere panem, break bread). From 1449, the descendants of Nikola IV founded eight branches of his family, and together with the Zrinski Counts were the ruling feudal family in the whole of Croatia right up to 1671. The Frankopans produced seven Croatian Bans, and many of them were patrons of Croatian artists.

Ivan VII Frankopan in particular was the only prince of the semi-independent Principality of Krk. He also promoted the settlement of Morlachs and Vlachs (originally Romanians who later split into Istro-Romanians) in the island (specifically in the areas of Dubašnica and Poljica and between the castles of Dobrinj and Omišalj) to have a bigger manpower. Thus, these Istro-Romanians would form a community in Krk that would influence the local Croatian dialect and leave several toponyms on the island. The Istro-Romanians of Krk disappeared in 1875 after the death of the last speaker of the local Istro-Romanian dialect, which some Croatian scholars named "Krko-Romanian". Nowadays, this ethnic group only inhabits Istria.

=== Venetian rule (1480–1797) ===
The island of Krk was a final Adriatic island to become part of the Venetian Empire. Due to its location, proximity to the Uskoks of Senj, it served as a lookout point, as well as first line of defence against the Uskoks. From that time on, the ruler was a Venetian noble, but the Small and the Large Councils both held a certain autonomy. The city laws were written in Latin and, after 1500, in Italian. Italian was also used for the church registers for births, marriages and deaths; other public documents were written in a Glagolitic script, which was widespread here more than anywhere else. At the beginning of 16th century the inhabitants of inland Croatia began to settle on Krk, as a result of their flight from the Ottoman invasions. Nonetheless, Krk still saw a decline, just like all the other Venetian lands. In year 1527 the town was recorded to have 10,461 inhabitants, while in 1527 it had 8,000.

=== Austrian rule ===
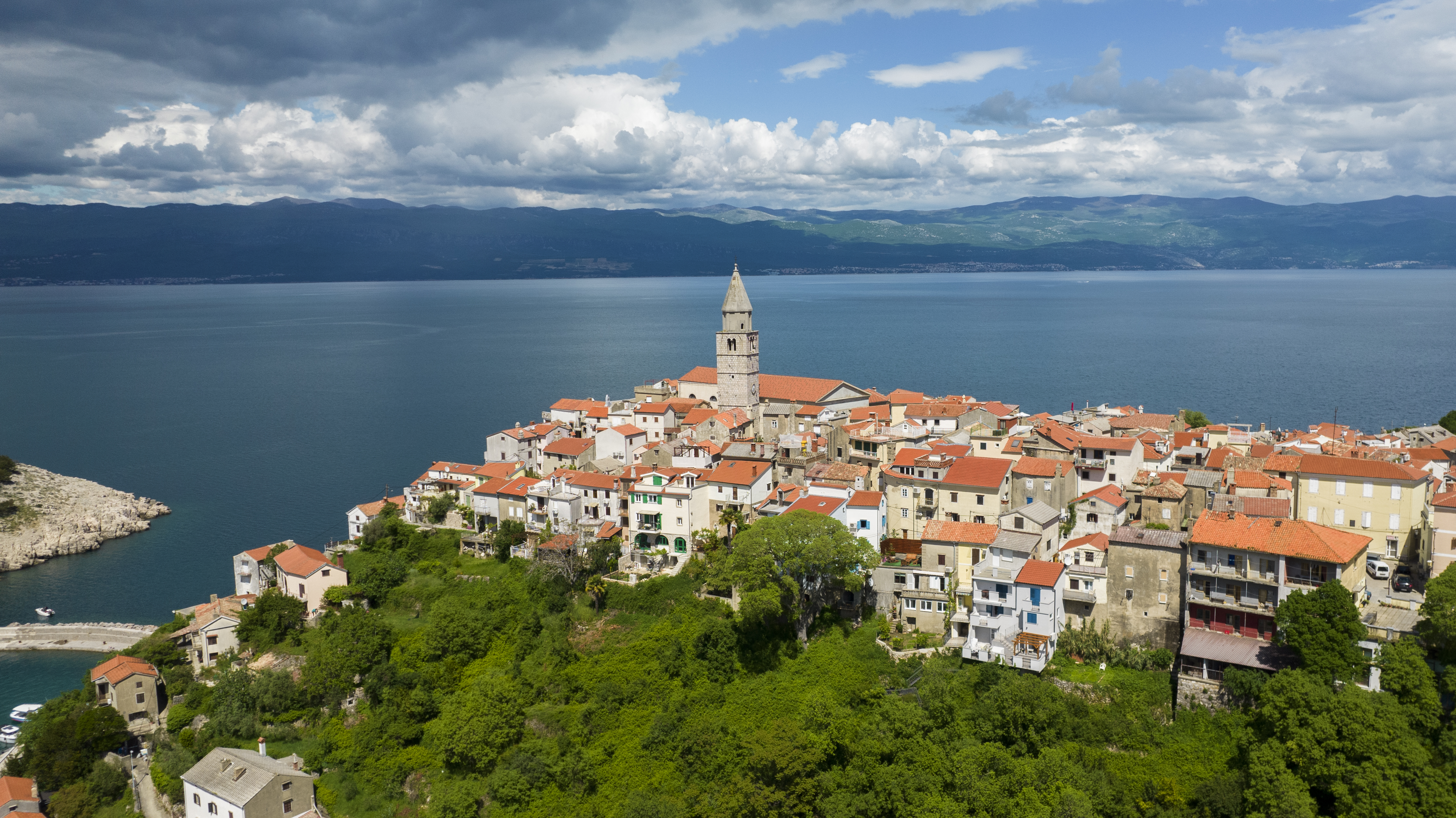
Vrbnik

Austrian rule over the island came after the fall of Venice in 1797 and was briefly (1806–1813) interrupted by the existence of Napoleon's Illyrian Provinces. In 1822 the Austrians separated the island from Dalmatia and linked it to Istria, therefore bringing the islands of Krk, Cres and Lošinj under direct rule from Vienna. This switch contributed to the appearance of Croatian National Revival, so along with nearby coastal town Kastav, the town of Krk played a major role in spreading of Croatian education and culture in the area.

=== 20th century ===
The Italian occupation (1918–1920) was brief, and Krk was handed over to Croatia, then in Yugoslavia, by the Treaty of Rapallo. Italy took Krk again in the Second World War (1941–1943), and German occupation followed from 1943 to 1945.

The post-war development of Krk was led by tourism. The building of an airport and then the Krk Bridge over to the mainland ensures the future of the development of tourism on this island. In Omišalj there has also been industrial development. The bridge is at the north end of Krk island and uses the small island of Otočić Sveti Marko (St. Mark's Islet) as a mid-support. The bridge was completed and opened in July 1980 and originally named Tito's Bridge (Croatian: Titov most) in honor of Yugoslav president Josip Broz Tito, who had died two months earlier. The bridge has since been renamed Krk Bridge or Krčki most.

=== Shipbuilding ===
The island has a long history of shipbuilding, dating to the Liburnians. The remains of a Liburnian-era shipyard have been found nearby, close to the harbor of Mala Luka. The name of the municipality of Dubašnica is derived from "Dub", an old Slavic word for oak. Oak forests made the island attractive for ship builders, dating to Liburnian times.

Malinska harbor was used as a port due to its protection from bura wind as well as its depth. The harbor of Vrbnik was used for shipbuilding in the 13th century.

== Economics and infrastructure ==
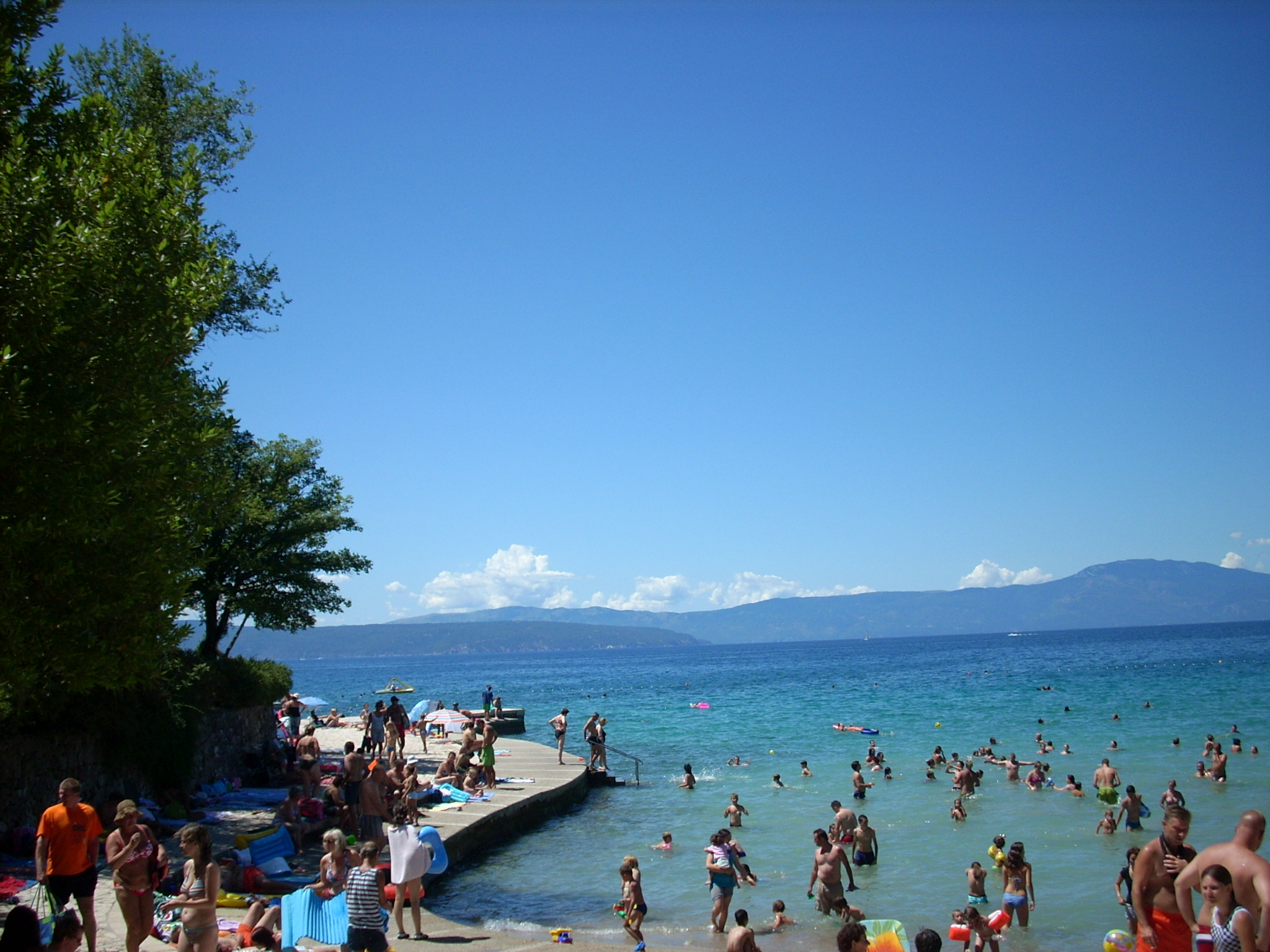
Beach Haludovo in Malinska. The view includes the island Cres and mountain Učka in the distance across the Bay Kvarner.

Krk is located rather near the mainland and has been connected to it since 1980 by the Krk Bridge, a 1,430 m (4,692 ft) two-arch concrete bridge, one of the longest concrete bridges in the world. Prior to construction of the bridge, a ferry carried passengers and vehicles from Črišnjevo on the mainland to a port located in the cove of Voz on Krk.

Due to proximity to the city of Rijeka on the mainland, Omišalj in the north of Krk hosts the Rijeka international airport. It also hosts an oil terminal, operated by Jadranski naftovod (JANAF), which is part of the Port of Rijeka, and a petrochemical plant. Since January 2021, an active LNG Hrvatska terminal storage and regasification ship has been moored in Omišalj, able to receive large LNG carrier ships and then to pump the gas into trans-European pipelines.

Krk is a popular tourist destination, due to its proximity to Slovenia, southern Germany, Austria, and northern Italy. Since the collapse of the Eastern Bloc, many tourists have come from Slovakia, Hungary, Romania, and other former Eastern Bloc countries.

== Geography ==
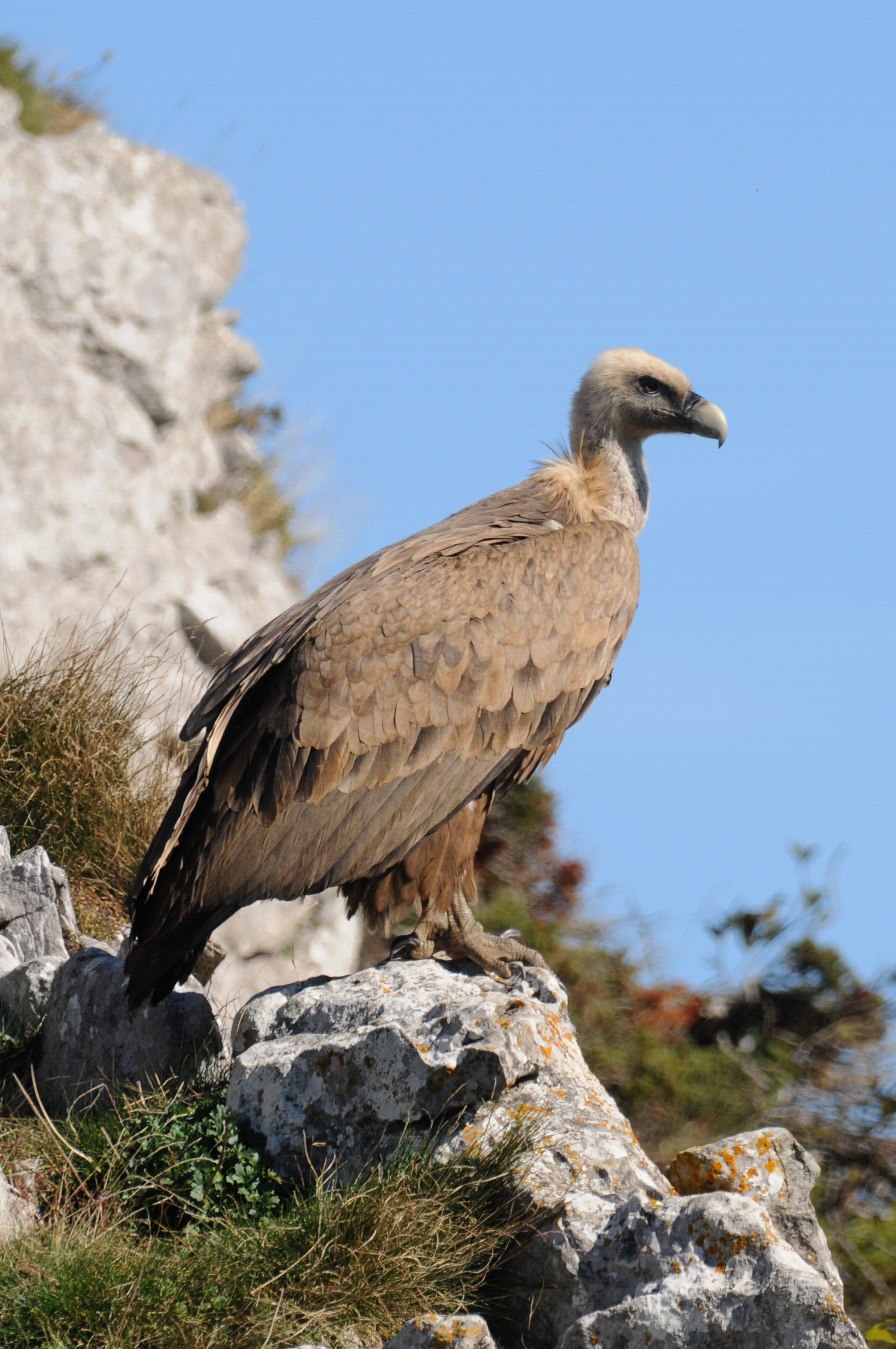
Eurasian griffon vulture (Croatian: Bjeloglavi sup) (Gyps fulvus), protected species of Croatia, living on the Island of Krk.

Krk, like many Croatian islands, is rocky and hilly. The rock is mostly karst. The southeast portion of the island is mostly bare as a result of the bora winds. Prominent features include Obzova, the highest point at 568 msl, and Vela Luka a harbor on the southeastern end of the island

The island forms part of the Kvarner Islands Important Bird Area (IBA), designated as such by BirdLife International because it supports significant numbers of many bird species, including breeding populations of several birds of prey. A Eurasian griffon vulture colony lives in a protected area called Kuntrep. There they breed at low elevations, with some nests at 10 m (33 ft). Therefore, contact with people is common.

== Culture and religion ==
Krk has historically been a center of Croatian culture. Various literature in the Glagolitic alphabet was created and in part preserved on Krk (notably the Baška tablet, one of the oldest preserved texts in Croatian). A monastery lies on the small island of Košljun in a bay off the coast of Krk.

Krk belonged to the Republic of Venice during much of the Middle Ages until its dissolution, when its destinies followed those of Dalmatia. It became part of the Kingdom of Serbs, Croats and Slovenes (later called Yugoslavia) after World War I, in 1920. After that date, the village of Veglia/Krk remained the only predominantly Italian-speaking municipality in Yugoslavia. After World War II, most of the Italians left.

The island of Krk is a participant in the 2020 European Capital of Culture project. Through the program "27 neighborhoods", the city of Krk, Malinska and Vrbnik will be involved in different events during the entire year. Along with them, the Municipality of Baška participated in the program "Lungomare Art", based on which a permanent art installation "Drops" was set up, which puts emphasis on traditional drywall architecture.

== Monuments and sights ==
- The Baška tablet in Jurandvor that was made in 1100
- Church of St. Lucy in Jurandvor, where the famous Baška tablet was found
- Art installation "Drops" on the hill above Baška
- Krk Cathedral that is dedicated to the Assumption of the Blessed Virgin Mary
- Krk Bridge which connects the island of Krk with the mainland since July 19, 1980

== Language ==
Krk is well known for its historical language diversity. The Middle Chakavian dialect of Croatian is the primary dialect used on the island. Five languages used to be spoken on the island: Venetian, Italian, Croatian, Dalmatian and Istro-Romanian, although the latter two have gone extinct in the island (and everywhere else in the case of Dalmatian). The Croatian dialect of Krk has Istro-Romanian influence.

== Municipalities ==
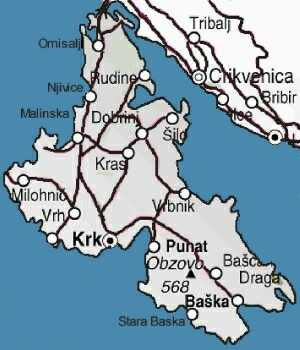
Krk detail

The municipalities and larger settlements on Krk include:

- The eponymous city of Krk, with 6,243 inhabitants (2011), located at 45°13′N 14°32′E.
- Omišalj: 2,987 people
- Malinska-Dubašnica – Malinska, the capital of municipality: 3,142 people
- Punat: 1,953 people
- Dobrinj: 2,023 people
- Baška: 1,668 people
- Vrbnik: 1,270 people
- Gabonjin
- Krašica
- Anton
- Pinezići
- Glavotok
- Valbiska
- Njivice
- Poljice
- Nenadići
- Sveti Vid Miholjice

== Roman Catholic bishopric ==
- Church of St. Dunat

== Other ==
The 45th parallel north passes through the island of Krk, making it positioned halfway between the Equator and the North Pole. The crossing of the 45th parallel is marked with a signpost.

=== Genetics ===
The frequency of Haplogroup I, rare elsewhere in Croatia and most of Europe, is high among the population. This characteristic is also found within Rusyns who are from southern Poland, Slovakia, and Ukraine. (Note: Nikitin 2009: 6/53 in Lemkos "Lemkos shared the highest frequency of haplogroup I ever reported and the highest frequency of haplogroup M* in the region.") (Note: Cvjetan 2004: 15/133)

=== Popular culture ===
The fictional island Everon from the video games Operation Flashpoint: Cold War Crisis and Arma Reforger is based on Krk.

The third season of the American TV-series The Witcher was filmed on Krk in April 2022.

== See also ==
- List of islands in the Adriatic
- Cres

== Bibliography ==
- Zeno, Reniero (February 12, 1851) [1260]. "Rainerio Zeno dužd mletački daruje polovinu krčkoga otoka Skineli, sinu Bartolovu i njegovomu ostanku; a drugu polovinu bratji Frederiku, Bartolu i Vidu, sinovom Vida kneza krčkoga i njihovomu ostanku". In Kukuljević Sakcinski, Ivan (ed.). Arkiv za pověstnicu jugoslavensku (in Serbo-Croatian). Vol. 1. Zagreb: Ljudevit Gaj. pp. 57–61.
- Milčetić, Ivan (September 11, 1884). "Arkeologično-istorične crtice s hrvatskih otoka IV" [Archaeological-Historical Outlines from Croatian Islands IV]. Vjestnik Kr. hrvatsko-slavonsko-dalmatinskog zemaljskog arkiva (in Serbo-Croatian) (6): 105–116. ISSN 0350-7165.
- Cvjetan, S; Tolk, HV; Lauc, LB; Colak, I; Dordević, D; Efremovska, L; Janićijević, B; Kvesić, A; et al. (2004). "Frequencies of mtDNA haplogroups in southeastern Europe – Croatians, Bosnians and Herzegovinians, Serbians, Macedonians and Macedonian Romani". Collegium Antropologicum. 28 (1): 193–8. PMID 15636075.
- Spicijarić Paškvan, Nina (2014). "Dalmatski (veljotski) i mletački utjecaji u govorima otoka Krka" (PDF). Krčki zbornik (in Croatian) (70): 71–88.
- Simović, Veselin (2000). "Dvadeseta obljetnica mosta kopno – otok Krk" [Twentieth anniversary of the Krk – mainland bridge] (PDF). Građevinar (in Croatian). 52 (8): 431–442.
