= Jurandvor =

- Village
- Location within Croatia
- Coordinates: 44°59′N 14°44′E
- Country: Croatia
- County: Primorje-Gorski Kotar County
- Municipality: Baška

Area
  - Total: 5.7 km^{2} (2.2 sq mi)

Population (2021)
  - Total: 330
  - Density: 58/km^{2} (150/sq mi)
- Time zone: UTC+1 (CET)
  - Summer (DST): UTC+2 (CEST)

Jurandvor is a village in Croatia, just to the north of Baška. It is connected by the D102 highway.

The historic Church of St. Lucy, Jurandvor is located in the village.

== Governance ==
=== Local ===
It is the seat of its own local committee.
