= Tribulje =

- Village
- Location within Krk Location within Croatia
- Coordinates: 45.13794°N 14.58508°E
- Country: Croatia
- County: Primorje-Gorski Kotar
- Municipality: Dobrinj

Area
  - Total: 1.2 km^{2} (0.46 sq mi)

Population (2021)
  - Total: 55
  - Density: 46/km^{2} (120/sq mi)
- Time zone: UTC+1 (CET)
  - Summer (DST): UTC+2 (CEST)

Tribulje is a village located on the Croatian island of Krk. It is part of the municipality of Dobrinj. As of 2021, it had 55 inhabitants. It is located just to the north of Klanice.
