= Klanice =

- Village
- Location within Krk Location within Croatia
- Coordinates: 45.13149°N 14.58329°E
- Country: Croatia
- County: Primorje-Gorski Kotar
- Municipality: Dobrinj

Area
  - Total: 1.0 km^{2} (0.39 sq mi)

Population (2021)
  - Total: 47
  - Density: 47/km^{2} (120/sq mi)
- Time zone: UTC+1 (CET)
  - Summer (DST): UTC+2 (CEST)

Klanice is a village located on the Croatian island of Krk. It is part of the municipality of Dobrinj. As of 2021, it had 47 inhabitants. It is located to the just to the south of Tribulje and to the north of Sveti Vid Dobrinjski.

== Governance ==
=== Local ===
It is the seat of the Local Committee of Klanice-Tribulje, encompassing itself and Tribulje.
